= List of North American fraternal orders =

This is a list of North American fraternal orders. Ethnic- and religious-oriented fraternal orders have their list.

== A ==
- American Benefit Society of New York – Headquartered in White Plains, New York. Had 939 members at the end of 1922.
- American Benefit Society – Incorporated in late 1893 in Massachusetts. Open to socially acceptable men and women ages 18–45 who believed in a supreme being, and able to earn a livelihood. The organization would not enter any but the "more healthful regions of the northern States" and was particularly concentrated in New England. There were 5,000 members in the late 1890s. In 1923 it had 1,300 benefit members in 44 lodges. The supreme lodge was located at 1147 Tremont Building, Boston Members could skip the initiation ritual if they desired. There were no secret features. Offered death and sick benefits on an assessment plan. Disbanded by 1931.
- American Benevolent Association – Founded in 1894 in St. Louis. Open to men 14–65 and women 14–55. there were 12,000 members in the late 1890s, spread out across Missouri, Illinois, Indiana, Michigan, Kentucky, Iowas, Nebraska, Kansas, Indian Territory, Colorado, Texas, Arkansas, Louisiana, Tennessee, Alabama, Georgia and Florida. There was only one degree, the ritual of which was "dignified and impressive." The emblems of the order emphasized "[e]quality for men and women, faith, hope and benevolence." Offered accident, sickness, and total disability insurance. Apparently disbanded by the early 1920s.
- American Benevolent Legion – Founded in the mid-1890s in San Francisco. Disbanded by the early 1920s.
- American Fraternal Insurance Union – Founded the mid-1890s in Batavia, New York. Open to men and women. Had lodges throughout western NY State, admitted men and women.
- American Fraternal League – Merged in the North American Union in 1905.
- American Home Watchmen – Founded in 1909 in Pennsylvania by the Rev. Moore Sanborn, DD, a Presbyterian minister. Open to white persons ages 16–60 who believed in a supreme being. There were 2,000 members in 1923, all of them in Western Pennsylvania. Locals called Forts, "Supreme Fort" located at 65 Chalfont Avenue, West View, Pittsburgh. Worked two degrees, Watchman and Scout. Ritual emphasized the three Hs Honor, Hope, and Health. Published a journal called The Scout. Its constitution pledged it to "improve its members socially, morally and intellectually, giving all the moral and material aid in its power to members and their dependents". This included sick and death benefits, as well as a plan for a home for aged or invalid members and their dependents.
- American Insurance Union
- American Legion of Honor
- American Order of Druids – Founded in Fall River, Massachusetts May 17, 1888, by William Pearson and William A. Dunn. Among the founders were members of the Grand United Order of Druids, the Ancient Order of United Workmen, and the United Order of Pilgrim Fathers. Membership was open to men and women in the New England states. There were 2,300 members in the late 1890s. The first Council was held on July 9, 1888. Paid sick and death benefits. Apparently defunct by the early 1920s.
- American Order of the Square – Founded in 1921 in Rochester, New York. The "superintendent of the organization" was John A. J. Papineau. Claimed to be non-sectarian and non-secret. A "patriotic, protective and philanthropic order" which also paid sick benefits.
- American Stars of Equity – Founded in 1903 in Illinois. Open to both sexes. Had 1,295 members in 1905. Headquarters in Freeport, Illinois. Provided accident, partial disability, and total disability benefits. Disbanded between 1910 and 1915. Merged in the North American Union in 1913.
- American Woodmen – Organized in 1901. Admitted men and women. Had 51,906 members in 525 lodges. Head office in the Arapaho Building, Denver, Colorado.
- American Workmen – Founded in 1908 in the District of Columbia. Open to men and women. In 1923 it had 14,629 members in 208 lodges in the District of Columbia, West Virginia, Pennsylvania, New Jersey, Louisiana, Arkansas, Mississippi, Alabama, Georgia, Florida, Tennessee, and Kansas. Headquarters at 716 Eleventh Street, Washington, DC. Published The American Workmen. Worked six degrees, First, Second, Third, Sixth, tenth, and Honor, each with distinctive "degree buttons". Had a secret ritual. Offered burial, sick, old age, and accident benefits.
- Ancient and Illustrious Order of the Star of Bethlehem – Had an elaborate pseudohistory which stated that the order was founded in the first century AD and connected the order, inter alia, with the Knights Templar, the Waldensians, the Bethlehemites, the Spanish Inquisition, St. Bartholomew's Day massacre and Giles Corey. The English-based order was permanently established in the United States in 1869 by Albert Gross of Newcastle upon Tyne. At this point, the organization was known as the Knights of the Star of Bethlehem. The Grand Commandery of Pennsylvania was instituted in 1870 and the Eminent Grand Commandery of North America in 1871. The order prospered for a while but membership declined between 18778 and 1884 and the organization was reorganized under the above name. Membership was open to acceptable men and women over the ages of 18 and 16 respectively. In the late 1890s, the order reportedly had more than 17,000 members in 19 states In 1923 the order still had 17,000 members, in 250 lodges in the US and the Canal Zone, with 20 lodges in the British West Indies. Headquarters at 5004 Cass Ave. Detroit. In addition to the Eminent Grand Commandery the reorganized bodies of the order included the Grand Council, Uniformed Conclaves, and Subordinate Lodges. Paid sick, accident, disability, and death benefits. Also endeavored to solve disputes between members by arbitration, procure employment and "defend the life, limb, and reputation of its members from unjust assault". Published The Fraternal Index.
- Ancient Order of Gleaners
- Ancient Order of Knights of Jerusalem – "One of the smaller fraternal benefit associations, paying death and funeral benefits." Its headquarters was in Washington, D.C., and it had a female auxiliary called the Ancient Order of the Daughters of Jerusalem. It was defunct by the early 1920s.
- Ancient Order of Pyramids – Founded in June 1895 in Topeka, Kansas. Admitted men and women. In 1904 had a benefit membership of 13,207 and a social membership of 2,800 in 243 subordinate lodges operating in Kansas, Missouri, Indian Territory, Oklahoma, Illinois, Colorado, and South Dakota. By 1904 the "Office of the Supreme Lodge" was in at the Gibraltar Building in Kansas City, Missouri. Officers included the Royal Prophet and the Royal Scribe. Was defunct by the early 1920s.
- Ancient Order of Sanhedrims – Founded April 1, 1895, in Richmond, Indiana (other sources say Virginia) by W. S. Iliff and Franklin Van Nuys. It was open to men of good moral character, sound physically, and already a member in good standing in a secret society. It was a splinter group of the "Orientals" (other sources use the name Ancient Order of the Knights of the Orient), a side degree of the Knights of Pythias.
- Ancient Order of United Workmen
- Arctic Brotherhood – Founded in Skagway, Alaska in 1899 following the arrival of the Ocean Steamer "City of Seattle." The founding membership roster boasted 11 members but soon swelled to more than 300 as the roots of The Brotherhood spread amongst the miners readying themselves for the trip up and over the Chilkoot Pass en route to the Klondike gold fields. The lodge provided health and death insurance for its members and generally improved the educational and social conditions of the booming mining camps. Its original Lodge #1 building currently serves as home of the Skagway Convention & Visitors Bureau.
- Artisans Order of Mutual Protection
- Atlantic Self-Endowment Association – Founded in 1886 in Greenville, South Carolina. Insured the lives of its members by mutual assessments. Reported defunct in the late 1890s.

== B ==
- Big Four Fraternal Life Association – Denver-based fraternal benefit society. Reported active in the late 1890s. The order was apparently defunct by the early 1920s.
- Brotherhood of America – Founded in 1890 in Philadelphia. Admitted men and women. In 1923 it had 3,176 benefit members and 11,000 social members in 138 lodges across Connecticut, New York, New Jersey, Pennsylvania, Delaware, and the District of Columbia. The organization's leader was titled "Supreme Washington". The governing body was called the "Supreme Circle" and was based at 2208 Frankfort Avenue, Philadelphia. Merged with Maccabees in 1935.
- Brotherhood of American Workmen – Active at least as of 1905, it was concerned with offering affordable insurance to working men. There was also a funeral ceremony.
- Brotherhood of American Yeomen – Founded in 1897. Membership open to men and women. Membership stood at 26,203 in 1908 and 43,212 in 1917. In 1923 it had 208,782 benefit members, 7,607 social members, and 3,191 lodges or "Homesteads". The Juvenile Department had 5,607 members. The B.A.Y was spread across the United States and into parts of Canada. The supreme office was known as the "Castle". Officers included the "Grand Foreman", "Grand Master", "Chief Correspondent" and "Grand Master of Accounts" The highest governing body was the "Supreme Conclave." Published a periodical called The Yeoman Shield. Ritual based on Sir Walter Scott's Ivanhoe. It also stated that chivalry and yeomanry were synonymous and that the English language and Magna Carta were the two most important accomplishments of man. It became the American Mutual Life Insurance Company in 1932.

== C ==
- Chevaliers of Pythias – Founded in Boston in 1888 as a charitable and benevolent society with optional sick and death benefits. Defunct by the late 1890s.
- Christian Burden Bearers Association – Established in 1885. In 1923 it had 819 members. Headquartered at 886 Elm Street, Manchester, New Hampshire.
- Church Fraternal – Merged in the North American Union in 1913.
- Columbian Circle – Founded in 1895. Open to men and women. Had 20,494 members in 365 lodges and had 638 members in the Juvenile Department. It operated in New York, Pennsylvania, Ohio, Indiana, Illinois, Michigan, Wisconsin, Minnesota, Iowa, Missouri, Nebraska, Colorado, Kansas, Arkansas, Louisiana, Mississippi, Alabama, Florida, Georgia, Tennessee, Kentucky, and the District of Columbia. The supreme conclave was at 69 West Washington Street, Chicago. It agreed to merge with Catholic Knights and Ladies of America in November 1918, after it was found that the latter group could not successfully adapt the American Experience Table. However, the merger could only go through in the summer of 1919 after the legislature legalized mergers.
- Columbian Fraternal Association – Founded in 1910. Had 6,790 members in 102 lodges in 1923. Headquarters at 509 7th Street, Washington, D.C.
- Columbian League – A splinter group of the Ancient Order of United Workmen. Founded in Detroit on October 12, 1896, by Past Supreme Master Workman and former Grand Recorder the Rev. W. Warne Wilson, the Rev. William Prall, D.D., William A. Pungs, Albert P. Jacobs. No action continued until January 1, 1897, when the preliminaries to creating a formal organization commenced. After 200 people had been signed up, the league was formally chartered on April 1, 1897. Wilson and the others had left the AOUW because of its refusal "to adopt certain changes which he thought vitally necessary" including increased cost of insurance as the order got older. "Patriotic and social" membership was open to all men, but only men between the ages of 18 and 50 were allowed to enroll in the death benefit dept. The order was intentionally founded on Columbus Day and made participating in Columbus Day parades an annual feature. It was apparently defunct by the early 1920s.
- Columbian Mutual Life Assurance Society
- Columbus Mutual Benefit Association – Founded in 1893 in Philadelphia. Membership was open to men and women 15–55. Ritual based on the landing of Columbus. Combined elements of a fraternal order with a building and loan association. Apparently defunct by the early 1920s.
- Court of Honor – Founded in 1895 as a splinter group of the Home Forum. At the national convention of the Home Forum in May 1895, in Detroit, a group of insurgents from the Springfield, Illinois, and other locals bolted. These insurgents charted a new organization on July 16, 1895. The first convention of 36 delegates was held in Springfield on July 23. A. L. Hereford was elected president and remained president through 1921. Membership stood at 1,861 at the creation of the society. This grew to 48,404 in 1900 and 68,365 in 1905 and nearly 80,000 members in 1921. In 1923 it had 68,648 benefit members and 1,422 social members in 1,020 lodges. The national convention was called the Supreme Court and officers included a supreme chaplain. They had an organ titled The Court of Honor. In 1924 became the Springfield Life Association. According to some sources it merged with Abraham Lincoln Life in 1934. Other sources say it was reinsured with Illinois Bankers Life in 1935.

== D ==
- Daughters of Hope – Faith Lodge #1 of this order was incorporated by the Rhode Island General Assembly on February 25, 1890., Hope Lodge #2 and Prosperity Lodge #4 were incorporated by the same method on March 24, 1893, and April 19, 1895, respectively. Despite this, the postal authorities were unable to trace it in the late 1890s.
- Degree of Honor Protective Association

== E ==
- Eclectic Assembly – Founded at Bradford, Pennsylvania, on January 3, 1893. Among the founders were there several Freemasons. Membership was open to men and women. There were 1,500 members in the late 1890s. The ritual was based on "mythology and its signs refer to God's covenant with man. There are also references to the red men, the early inhabitants of America." The order's emblem was an anchor inside of an equilateral triangle with the words Hope, Truth, and Charity emblazoned on each side. The organization was apparently defunct by the early 1920s.
- Empire Knights of Relief – Founded in 1889 in Buffalo, New York. Among the founders were Freemasons, Oddfellows, members of the Royal Arcanum, and the Ancient Order of United Workmen. Open to "temperate, industrious" men ages 20–55 years who can pass a medical examination. There were 4,000 members in the late 1890s spread over six states. While they had no secrets or oaths, members did have a "solemn obligation" to help each other and the supreme secretary did say that the group counted as a secret society. The ritual was based on the Golden Role and inculcated "obedience to moral and civil law". The motto of the order was "Benevolence, Philanthropy and Charity". It was defunct by the early 1920s.
- Equitable Aid Union – Founded March 22, 1879, in Columbus, Pennsylvania. Four of the founders were also Freemasons. Membership was open to men and women above the 36°30' latitude who were 15 to 55 years old. In 1896 it had 30,000 members, 5,000 of whom were social, spread out in 24 US States and Canada. Membership was concentrated in the rural areas of Ohio, Pennsylvania, and New York. Locals were called Unions, state and provincial organizations were called Grand Unions and the highest organ was the Supreme Organ. In April 1897 the union went into receivership.
- Equitable Fraternal Union – Founded in August 1897. It admitted men and women regardless of religious or political belief. Had 29,310 members in 504 lodges in 1923. In 1979 it had 45,000 members. And 29,733 in 1993. Lodges called "Assemblies", national structure "General Assembly". Headquarters, or ("Supreme Assembly") at Neenah, Wisconsin. There was a ritual which mentioned God and Heaven, but not Jesus, which led to criticism from some religious groups. The society still had a ritual in 1979 with an Inner and Outer Guard and a blackball system for choosing new members. When the Equitable Fraternal Union merged with the Fraternal Reserve Association in 1930, it became the Equitable Reserve Association. Absorbed Germania Mutual Life Assurance in 1949 and the Royal League of Berwyn, Ill. at a later point. In addition to insurance the group sponsors scholarships, softball, and junior league baseball kids' Christmas parties usually through the local units. The society still had a ritual in 1979 with an Inner and Outer Guard and a blackball system for choosing new members.
- Equitable League of America – A Baltimore-based mutual benefit fraternal order established in the late 1880s. Disestablished in 1894.

== F ==
- Federal Benefit Association – Had 1,345 members in 1922. Headquarters in Camden, New Jersey
- Federal Reserve Association – By 1923 it had moved to Wilkes-Barre, Pennsylvania, and had 1,469 members.
- Fraternal Aid Association – Founded October 14, 1890, in Lawrence, Kansas. Founders included members of the Ancient Order of United Workmen, Modern Woodmen of America, and the Maccabees. Membership was open to acceptable white men and women between the ages of 18 and 55 who were not part of a particularly hazardous occupation. Honorary membership was open to "specified relatives" of beneficiary members. The order also "declined to recruit" from people living along the Atlantic Coast from Virginia to Texas, Cook County, Illinois, the area south of Centralia, Illinois, St. Louis, Milwaukee, Detroit, Cincinnati, New York City, San Francisco, Sacramento and any other city with a population higher than 200,000. It had 3,000 members in the late 1890s. The association was governed by a General Council and the lower bodies with called State or local Councils. There was a "modern" ritual. The emblem of the order was a shield with stars and stripes with a clasped hand on it with the initials of the order. No assessments were levied until a claim was made.
- Fraternal Aid Union – Founded circa 1915 by various fraternal benefit societies that had broken down due to an inadequate assessment program. They used a new method called the "American Four" plan which combined the American Experience table with a 4% interest. This had successfully put the union in financial order by 1919. Among the groups that merged into it was the Improved Order of Heptasophs in 1917. In 1920 there were 94,000 according to Statistics, Fraternal Societies. By 1923 this fell to 79,045 benefit members in 1,908 lodges. Then went down to 67,385 by 1930. Became Standard Life Association in 1933. The union was governed by a supreme lodge and an advisory board, and its officers included a supreme president and supreme secretary.
- Fraternal Association of America – A short-lived fraternal beneficiary society headquartered in Boston in the late 1880s and early 1890s.
- Fraternal Brotherhood – Founded 1896 in California. Membership is open to men and women. There were 23,720 benefit and 711 social members in 280 lodges in 1923. They were spread out across the states of California, Arizona, New Mexico, Nevada, Utah, Colorado, Oregon, Washington, Idaho, Montana, Kansas, Oklahoma, Texas, Michigan, Wisconsin, Illinois, Kentucky, and West Virginia. Headquarters at 845 South Figueroa Street, Los Angeles. The order was governed by a supreme lodge and an executive council. Among its officers was the supreme secretary. Each lodge had a chaplain. There was also a juvenile department for children of members. The brotherhood had a secret ritual, passwords, grips, and signs.
- Fraternal Guild – Founded in San Francisco in 1889. Stevens was unable to trace it in the late 1890s.
- Fraternal Legion – Founded in 1881 in Baltimore. Levied first assessment in May 1883. No record of it in the 1898 Statistics, Fraternal Societies Apparently defunct by the late 1890s.
- Fraternal Mystic Legion – Founded December 9, 1884, in Columbus, Ohio. Among the founders were several Masons, some of whom had attained the 32° in the Scottish Rite. Other members were Pythians. Membership was open to acceptable men ages 18–49 who were "business and professional men". There were upwards of 12,000 members in 1896. That year it was registered with the state authorities in New York, New Jersey, Pennsylvania, Maryland, Michigan, Illinois, Iowa, and Nebraska. By 1910 membership was 22,000, and in 1915 it was 17,458. Locals were called Subordinate Rulings, state organizations Grand Rulings, and the national structure the Supreme Ruling. Subordinate Rulings were found in "healthful localities, where sufficient good, eligible and desirable candidates are found". When a state had fifteen Rulings or 500 members, a Grand Ruling was instituted. Officers included the supreme mystic ruler, supreme treasurer, and supreme medical director. In June 1894, the Supreme Ruling moved from Columbus to Philadelphia. Each Subordinate Ruling had a "Worthy Chaplain" who opened and closed meetings with prayers.
- Fraternal Order of Colonials – Licensed by the Missouri Insurance Department on July 23, 1903. Membership was open to acceptable white men 18–55 who were not engaged in a hazardous profession. Assessments were on a flat rate, meaning that the members all paid the same rate. The order was defunct by the 1920s.
- Fraternal Order of Eagles – Fra≤ternal Order of Eagles (F.O.E.) is an international fraternal organization that was founded on February 6, 1898, in Seattle, Washington, by a group of six theater owners including John Cort (the first president), brothers John W. and Tim J. Considine, Harry (H.L.) Leavitt (who later joined the Loyal Order of Moose), Mose Goldsmith, and Arthur Williams.[1] Originally made up of those engaged in one way or another in the performing arts, the Eagles grew and claimed credit for establishing the Mother's Day holiday in the United States as well as the "impetus for Social Security" in the United States. Their lodges are known as "aeries".
- Fraternal Order of Moai – Founded in 2005 in Columbus, Ohio. Using Moai iconography and open to men and women, it was initially created with the goal of the preservation of tiki culture, especially historical information about and artifacts from the Kahiki Supper Club in Columbus.
- Fraternal Order of Police
- Fraternal Order of Protectors – A mutual assessment fraternal order headquartered in Lincoln, Nebraska, circa the early 1890s.
- Fraternal Reserve Association – Founded in 1902 in Oshkosh, Wisconsin. In 1919 it resolved to offer whole life insurance, including for the children of members.
- Fraternal Tributes – Founded in July 1897 in Rock Island, Illinois. As a unique feature, the orders were guaranteed by a loan and indemnity company. Began with 750 members. Had 9,084 members in 1908. Not recorded in the 1915 Statistics, Fraternal Societies. defunct by the early 1920s.
- Fraternal Union of America – Founded in Denver on September 1, 1896, by F. F. Rose and F. A. Falkenburg. Rose was a member of several fraternal groups including the Mason, Heptasophs, Red Men, JOUAM, AOUW, Modern Woodmen, Pythians and Phi Delta Theta. Open to men and women. Had 5,000 members in the late 1890s. Offered death, sickness, disability, and old age benefits. However, it had no secret features. It was still around as of 1912 but had become defunct by the early 1920s.
- Fraternity of Friendly Fellows – Founded in 1885 in New York. Still active according to the 1890 census. But apparently defunct by 1897.
- Free African Union Society – Founded 1780 in Newport, Rhode Island

== G ==
- Globe Fraternal Legion – Founded in 1889. Headquartered in 7 W. Lexington Street Baltimore. The ritual didn't make the chaplain a necessary figure at meetings, though it has a religious hymn and oath, secret grips, signs, and counter signs.
- Golden Rule Alliance – Founded in Boston sometime before 1889. Mentioned in the 1890 census. Its membership "was not large, nor did it secure a national reputation." It was defunct by the late 1890s.
- Golden Seal Assurance Society – Originally known as the Order of the Golden Seal. Name changed at the June 1919 Supreme Camp in Roxbury, New York. Had 9,742 members at the end of 1921. Officers included the supreme commander, supreme vice-commander, supreme secretary, supreme treasurer, supreme consul, medical director, and general consul. There was also a supreme council that governed in between Supreme Camps. The field organizers were called the "Booster Club". It operated on a "lodge system". It had a secret ritual and signs for identifying members.
- Golden Star Fraternity – Founded in 1881 in Newark, New Jersey. Open to men and women. There were approximately 2,200 members in the states of Connecticut, New York, and New Jersey, but principally the latter. Had "neither a prohibition, religious or political bias." The ritual emphasized benevolence and charity. Apparently defunct by the early 1920s.
- Grand Fraternity – Sources disagree on the origin of this order. Stevens states that it was organized in Philadelphia in 1885. However Preuss and Schmidt say that it was incorporated in Indiana in 1885, and reincorporated in Pennsylvania in 1893. Its founders included Masons, Knights of Honor, members of the Royal Arcanum, the American Legion of Honor and the Order of Chosen Friends. Membership was open to acceptable white persons over the age of 18, of good moral character who believed in a supreme being. All members are known as Fraters, regardless of gender. There were 2,000 members in the late 1890s. By 1923, the group had 15,259, with a Juvenile Dept. with 1,056 members. That year, the order had 145 lodges, and its headquarters was at 1626–28 Arch Street in Philadelphia. Its emblem was a four-leaf clover with the letters spelling out "Help" on the leaves. The ritual involved no mysteries or historical incidents but was limited to an explanation of the orders principles. The order merged with the Tribe of Ben-Hur in 1936.
- Grand Order of Nazarites – Founded in 1863 in Baltimore for charitable and fraternal purposes. One of the earlier societies was to pay sick and funeral benefits. Mentioned in the census of 1890, but defunct by the late 1890s.
- Grand United Order Independent Sons and Daughters of Purity – Founded sometime prior to 1890 in Harrisburg, Virginia. It was extinct by the 1890s.
- Granite League – Founded in Philadelphia in the 1880s.

== H ==
- Heralds of Liberty – There were at least two organizations by this name. One based in Huntsville, Alabama, was recorded as having 22,208 members in 1921. Another one was founded in Philadelphia in 1900. It admitted men and women and had 25,451 members in 177 lodges in 1923. Officers included the supreme recorder, and the headquarters was at 2010–12 Chestnut Street, Philadelphia. It had a ritual that was revised in the early 1920s.
- Home Benefit Association – Founded in 1893 in Boston. Admitted men and women in the New England states. In 1923 had 4,313 members in 42 lodges. Supreme Lodge located at I Beacon Street, Boston.
- Home Circle – Founded in Boston in 1879 as an auxiliary degree of the Royal Arcanum, open to members of the latter as well as their wives, mothers, daughters, and women friends. In addition to the Royal Arcanum, all of the founders were also Masons and members of the Knights of Honor, some were also Oddfellows and members of the Ancient Order of United Workmen. In 1881 the Legislature of Massachusetts passed a special act incorporating it as a separate order open to men and women regardless of their connection to the Royal Arcanum. Membership was open to men and women 18–55 who could pass a medical exam and were accepted by ballot. Those over 55 could join as social members. In the late 1890s there were 8,000 members spread across Maine, New Hampshire, Massachusetts, Rhode Island, Connecticut, New York, New Jersey, Pennsylvania, Maryland, the District of Columbia, Virginia, North Carolina, Georgia, Ohio, Michigan, Illinois, Missouri and Nebraska, as well as the Canadian provinces of New Brunswick, Quebec and Ontario. The overall organization was called the Supreme Council, state and provincial bodies were called Grand Councils – which were created after each territory acquired 1,000 members – and locals were called Subordinate Councils. The ritual of the order was based on the Golden Rule and stressed morality and correct living. The order's emblem was an H and a circle.
- Home Forum Benefit Society – Charted in Illinois in 1892. Founders included Masons and members of the Modern Woodmen of America. Membership is open to men and women 16–55 who lived in healthful areas and were not engaged in a hazardous occupation. Those over the age limit could join as social members. There were about 12,000 members concentrated in the states of Illinois, Missouri, Iowa, and Michigan. Members who became intoxicated were suspended for three months and were expelled for a second offense. The ritual was based on ancient Roman motifs, hence the name "Forum". Its emblem was a gold star with the initials of honesty, fraternity, benevolence, temperance, and patriotism at the angles. Officers included a president, vice-president, Orator, and Historian. The initiation ceremony involved teaching the initiates the Forum Signal and using a fasces and Bible to explain the goals of the order. Arthur Preuss dismissed the ritual as "rather harmless" and stated that the society had probably dissolved by the early 1920s.
- Home Guards of America – Order based in Van Wert, Ohio. Its president, Dr. G. J. Eblen became treasurer of the American Insurance Union when the two merged.
- Home Palladium – Founded in August 1891 in Kansas City, Missouri. Membership is open to acceptable white men and women. Avoided the malarial and yellow fever districts of the South. Those engaged in hazardous or extra-hazardous professions had to pay higher rates. Had 2,000 members in the late 1890s. Offered permanent, partial, and total disability and death insurance based on 12 graded assessments. Apparently defunct by the early 1920s.
- Homesteaders – Originated as a split of the Brotherhood of American Yeomen in 1906. Brothers John E. Paul and Clarence B. Paul, who were among the founders, were voted out of the leadership after a supreme conclave in late 1905. They had aroused the anger of a faction within the group due to their "eccentric" religious beliefs and practices. On February 13, 1906, they incorporated a new group called "The Homesteaders" after the "Homesteads" that were the locals of the B.A.Y. The order was open to men and women and "the personnel of the membership is of the highest caliber...extreme care is exercised to admit none but first-class risks, physically and morally, and to build for permanency and stability." The order began in 1906 with 3,200 members. By 1913 this had grown to 18,766. In 1923 it had over 30,000 members in 23 states and Canada. The Supreme Office was in Des Moines, Iowa. The order had a newspaper called Back-Log. The order had a ritual and chaplains, but they claimed that they were "not a secret society in any objectionable sense. In 1923 became Homesteaders Life Association. In 1932 merged with Golden Life Insurance Co. – formally the Fraternal Brotherhood. In 1948 became Homesteaders Life Company.

== I ==
- Illinois Order of Mutual Aid – Founded in 1878 in Springfield, Illinois, as an offshoot of Ancient Order of United Workmen. Open to men only. There were 6,000 members in the late 1890s. It differed from the AOUW in that it offered "accrued assessments", in addition to death benefits. It was apparently defunct by the early 1920s.
- Imperial Legion – A Denver, Colorado–based order that had lodges as far east as Missouri. It was defunct by the early 1920s.
- Improved Order of Heptasophs
- Independent Order of Chosen Friends
- Independent Order of Mechanics – Founded April 19, 1868, in Baltimore. Open to acceptable white men 18–55. Had 10,000 members in the late 1890s. The motto was "Friendship, Truth and Love". Emblems included representation of Jacob's Ladder and the ark. defunct by the early 1920s.
- Independent Order of Mystic Brothers – Founded in 1882 in Boston. Active as late as 1890, but untraced by the late 1890s.
- Independent Order of Puritans – Organized March 1903. Open to men and women 18–55. In 1919 it had 15,011 members in 445 lodges spread across Pennsylvania, New Jersey, Kentucky, Montana, Arkansas, and New Mexico. Officers included the supreme president, supreme secretary-treasurer, supreme counsel, and supreme medical examiner. Home Office in Pittsburgh, Pennsylvania.
- Independent Order of Shepherds – Founded in 1917 at Toledo, Ohio. The group's Supreme Secretary as of 1921 was Charles H. Jenne. A letter of inquiry sent to him in July 1923 brought no reply.
- Independent Western Star Union – Headquartered at Chicago. Had 7,339 benefit members as of January 1, 1921
- Independent Workmen of America – Founded in Omaha, Nebraska circa mid 1890s. They were apparently defunct by the early 1920s.
- Industrial Benefit Association – Headquartered in St. Louis, MO. Had 6,000 benefit members as of January 1, 1921
- Industrial Benefit Order – a short-lived Boston-based fraternal order.
- Industrial Order of America – a short-lived Boston-based fraternal order.
- International Fraternal Alliance of Baltimore – founders included Masons, Oddfellows, Red Men and Pythians. Membership is open to men and women. There were 10,000 members in 30 states and Canada in the late 1890s. The orders ritual showed signs of Masonic influence. It combined aspects of a fraternal order with a building and loan association. In addition to paying sick, disability, and death benefits, it also helped members secure homes on favorable terms.
- International Geneva Association – Founded in 1877, this was a fraternal organization for people in the hotel, catering, and restaurant business. Other sources give its date of foundation as 1904. In 1949 it had 6,000 members in 34 branches. In the mid-1970s it had c.1,200. It was headquartered in New York.
- International Order of the King's Daughters and Sons – founded in 1886, this fraternal order engages in philanthropic work including "building churches; paying mortgages on those already built; educating the young men and women for the ministry and for the foreign mission field; taking care of orphans and widows, of the old and the sick; building hospitals and infirmaries; sending trained nurses to the homes of the poor; and following the sailors with evidences of loving care." Its insignia is a "silver cross as the outward symbol of their pledge of love and service and more than one thousand different lines of work upon which they have entered".
- Iowa Legion of Honor
- Iron Hall, of Baltimore City – A reorganization of the Indiana-based Order of the Iron Hall, which went into receivership in 1892. The new organization was founded the same year in Baltimore and its founders included Masons, Pythians, members of the Knights of Honor, and Order of Chosen Friends. Membership was open to acceptable white persons 16–65 who believed in a supreme being and were "competent to earn a livelihood". It had 9,000 members in the late 1890s. The order has a "brief and pointed ritual". Offered sick, death, and old age benefits.

== K ==
- Keystone Guard – While this organization did business in several states in the early decades of the 20th century, it was defunct by the early 1920s. The seat of its "Supreme Secretary" was in Athens, Pennsylvania
- Knights of the Ancient Order of the Mystic Chain
- Knights of the Blue Cross of the World – Founded in 1888 in Homer, Michigan. Paid out sick and death benefits on the assessment plan. Defunct by the late 1890s.
- Knights of Columbia – Headquartered in Topeka, Kansas. Lodges were scattered in the Mississippi and Missouri valleys. Membership is reportedly not very large in the late 1890s.
- Knights of the Globe – Founded in Chicago in 1889. The order itself was fraternal, but not beneficiary. A connected organization, the Knights of the Globe Mutual Benefit Association was created in 1890 and open only to members of the order or its female auxiliary, the Daughters of the Globe. Among the founders were Scottish Rite Freemasons, Oddfellows, members of the AOUW, the Royal Arcanum, American Legion of Honor, Woodmen of the World, and the Grand Army of the Republic among others. The M.B.A. was open to members of the parent organization between ages 18–56. There were 7,000 members of the order in the late 1890s "well distributed across the west", but mostly in Illinois. Worked four degrees – Volunteer, Militant, Knight, and Valiant Knight. It was defunct by the early 1920s.
- Knights of the Golden Links of the World – Founded in Nashville, Tennessee, in 1886, however apparently extinct by the late 1890s.
- Knights of Honor
- Knights of Honor of the World – Founded circa 1890s in Natchez, Mississippi. Apparently defunct by the early 1920s.
- Knights and Ladies of America – Founded 1894 in New York. Founders included Freemasons, members of the American Legion of Honor, Royal Arcanum, and the JOUAM. Open to men and women 16–60. Did not have a physical examination requirement. The locals were called Subordinate Councils and the overall group was the supreme council. The ritual work of the group was described as "not elaborate". Motto "Love, Truth Justice". Provided death, sick, and disability benefits as well as building and loan features.
- Knights and Ladies of Azar – Founded in 1893 in Chicago as the Knights of Azar. Changed its name when it reorganized to include female members. Planned to charter itself with the State of Illinois once it had 500 members.
- Knights and Ladies of David – Founded 1914 in Los Angeles. Membership is open to men and women. Headquarters at 730 S. Grand Ave. as of 1921. It became defunct sometime before 1923.
- Knights and Ladies of the Fireside – Founded in 1892 in Kansas City, Missouri, by representatives of fraternal orders in Missouri and Kansas. It was open to men and women and had 5,000 members in the late 1890s. Offered life, accident, sickness, and death insurance. Its Supreme Secretary was S. H. Snider, former Superintendent of Insurance of the State of Kansas. It was defunct by the early 1920s.
- Knights and Ladies of the Golden Precept – Founded in 1896 in Clinton, Iowa. Charted in that state it had plans, as of the late 1890s, of expanding into other states of the Union.
- Knights and Ladies of the Golden Rule – Founded in August 1879, in Cincinnati, but chartered in Kentucky that same month. Many of the founders were members of the Order of Mutual Aid, which had just been dissolved after the yellow fever epidemic that hit Memphis in 1878. Founders also included members of the AOUW and the Knights of Honor. The original name was simply Knights of the Golden Rule. The order was open to white men and women 18 to 55. There were 3,000 members in the late 1890s. Local groups were called Castles, state organizations were grand chapters, and the overall organization was the supreme commandery. In the late 1890s, there were Castles in Ohio, Indiana, Illinois, Minnesota, Missouri, Kentucky, West Virginia, Virginia, North Carolina, South Carolina, Tennessee, Georgia, Alabama, Mississippi, Louisiana, Arkansas, Texas, Massachusetts, New Jersey and California. The emblem was a shield with the letters K.G.R. over a circle with the golden rule on the center of which are two clasped hands. Below are five links of a chain with the letters F and P, which may or may not stand for Friendship and Protection. The order was divided into three classes, paying $500, #1,000, and $2,000 death benefits respectively. Assessment fees were graded by age. defunct by the early 1920s.
- Knights and Ladies of the Golden Star – Founded January 11, 1884 Newark, New Jersey. Its founders were members of the Royal Templars of Temperance, though this order itself was not a temperance group. Membership is open to men and women 16–65 years old, excluding bartenders and saloon keepers. Unique in that it allows entire families to join, providing insurance to children. Originally limited to Newark, it later spread to New York and other parts of New Jersey. The gold star in its name referred to the Star of Bethlehem. Its only secret was its password. It was apparently defunct by the early 1920s.
- Knights and Ladies of Honor
- Knights and Ladies Order of the Cross – Founded July 4, 1921, in Crossville, Tennessee. Officers included a supreme commander, supreme secretary, supreme treasurer, and supreme medical examiner. Its ritual was based on Constantine's vision of the cross. Assessment rates based on the National Fraternal Congress of America Table of mortality.
- Knights of the Protected Ark- Chartered under the Laws of Kansas from 1903 to 1904. Its object is to unite white persons into one bond of true fellowship: to bring its members into a closer union of brotherly love: to educate its members socially, morally, and intellectually; to visit the sick; to bury the dead; to care for the widow and orphan.; to provide earning income for him whose earning power is lost; to create., establish and perpetuate a system of protection for its members, to whom this constitution is provided for their earnest consideration. Active in Colorado and Kansas.
- Knights and Ladies of the Round Table – At least two organizations of this name existed. One was founded in 1887 in Bloomington, Illinois, and recorded in the 1890 census, but Stevens was unable to get into contact with it by the late 1890s. The other was still existing in some midwestern states by the late 1890s, particularly around Toledo, Ohio. It was defunct by the early 1920s.
- Knights and Ladies of Security – Founded in 1892 in Topeka, Kansas. Later known as the Security Benefit Association. In 1950 it became the non-fraternal life insurance company Security Benefit Life Insurance, which continues to operate as an insurance and annuity company in Topeka.
- Knights of the Loyal Guard – Founded on January 31, 1895, in Flint, Michigan, by Edwin O. Wood. Open to men and women. Had 5,000 members and Lodges in 104 cities in the late 1890s. Only issued death benefits. It moved to an unknown location sometime before the early 1920s.
- Knights of the Seven Wise Men of the World – Headquartered in Nashville, Tennessee. Listed in the 1890 census, but untraced in the late 1890s.
- Knights of Sobriety, Fidelity and Integrity – Founded in 1890 in Syracuse, New York. It had about 5,000 members, mostly in New York State, but did business in a dozen states. It was apparently defunct by the early 1920s.

== L ==
- Ladies American League – A female-only fraternal order based in Benton Harbor, Michigan. It had a five-degree ritual "each one a step upward, which holds interest." State Directors were made members of the supreme conclave. Despite advertising for organizers in the June 1921 issue of Fraternal Monitor the post office could not locate the national director in 1923.
- League of Friendship, Mechanical Order of the Sun
- Legion of the Red Cross – Founded in 1884 by members of the Knights of the Golden Eagle. Open to acceptable white men aged 18–50 who could pass a medical examination. There were 4,500 members in the late 1890s. Membership concentrated in Maryland, Delaware, Pennsylvania, New Jersey, and New York. Had 3,100 members in 1905, 2,300 in 1910. State organizations called Grand Councils, overall organization the supreme council. Headquarters in Baltimore. Ritual based on the history of the Crusades. The emblem is a red Maltese cross with the letters L.O.R.C. in the arms and a circle in the center containing a cross and crown. Offered sick and death benefits, also pledged to help members find employment and assist them in business. Merged in the North American Union in 1914.
- Lincoln Fraternal Union – A Litchfield, Illinois–based order that merged with the Columbian Circle in 1918. This was not because its funds were inadequate but because there were too few members of the society to keep it solvent.
- Light of the Ages – An Indianapolis-based fraternal benefit society that dropped its fraternal features in 1897 and became an insurance company.
- Loyal American League – Founded in Des Moines, Iowa, by William B. Jarvis, a former organizer of the Order of Owls. In addition to being a beneficiary organization, it also was committed to "combating Puritan intolerance." It was defunct by the early 1920s.
- Loyal American Life Association – Incorporated in Illinois in 1896. Open to men and women. Had 15,851 benefit members and 80 social members in 535 subordinate lodges. Originally headquartered in Springfield, Illinois, move to Chicago in 1911. It had secret ritualistic work. Face a difficult period transitioning from a low insurance rate to an actuarially sound system in the early 1920s, eventually bringing every member into the sound system on January 1, 1921.
- Loyal Circle – Founded in Champaign, Illinois, in the mid-1890s. Apparently defunct by the early 1920s.
- Loyal Knights and Ladies – Founded November 11, 1881, by the Mizpah Lodge, Boston of the Knights and Ladies of Honor, when they seceded from that organization. The Mizpah Lodge charted five other lodges and these came together to create a "High Court" on December 6, 1883. This became an Imperial Court on February 23, 1884. Formally incorporated on June 18, 1895. Membership is open to "socially acceptable white persons who can pass the required physical examination". There were approximately 600 members in the late 1890s, 100 of whom were social members. The order paid death benefits and some Courts paid sick benefits.
- Loyal Mystic Legion of America – Founded in 1892, disappeared by 1920. Based in Hastings, Nebraska Had "just under" 6,000 members in 1900, and circa 5,000 in 1910.

== M ==
- The Maccabees
- Million Dollar Yeoman Club – The first two Million Dollar Yeoman Clubs were founded in 1922 in Detroit and Milwaukee by J. R. Ramsey and J. G. B. Fletcher, respectively. The idea was to create clubs of 200 members each from different occupations, each holding $5,000 certificates.
- Modern American Fraternal Order – Founded in 1896 in Effingham, Illinois, by William B. Wright and others. The order paid sick, disability, and death benefits. Reportedly had 1,000 members in the late 1890s. According to the December 1, 1910 by-laws of the order membership was open to "acceptable white persons between the ages of sixteen and fifty-five years, of good moral character and reputable business." Social members did not have benefits and could not be elected representatives to the Orders governing bodies. Beneficiary membership was denied to people occupied in many professions including manufacturers of good powder or other explosives, seamen, professional athletes, saloon-keepers, or soldiers in times of war. Those who engaged in "immoral practice or improper conduct", consumed alcohol or narcotics excessively, or used profane language at Lodge meetings were liable to be reprimanded, suspended, or expelled from the order, pending trial. While the order was open to people without reference to creed, faith, or politics the Orders officers included a supreme chaplain at the national level and chaplains at the subordinate level. Subordinate Lodges were forbidden from conducting business on Sundays. It was defunct by the mid-1920s.
- Modern Aztecs – Merged in the North American Union in 1905.
- Modern Brotherhood of America
- Modern Knights Fidelity League – Founded in 1891 in Kansas by members of the Royal Arcanum, National Union, Woodmen of the World, and others. Incorporated under the laws of Kansas, with its headquarters at Kansas City, Kansas, in 1893. Membership is open to men and women aged 18–56 years old who live in the "more healthful portions of the country." There were 5,000 members in the late 1890s. The governing body was the Supreme Council which was made up of the executive officers as well as representatives of the Grand Councils, which were the state-level organizations. Locals were called Subordinate Councils. Worked three degrees based on the lives of Don Quixote and Sancho Panza. Its insurance scheme included combining all death, old age annuities, and endowments into one certificate. Tables of graded risks based on age at the time of joining the order determined the cost of benefits. The league offered weekly sickness benefits ranging from $2.50 to $10, a reserve fund for old age, death, and disability benefits. Members began receiving old age annuities when they reached 70. There were also widows and orphans benefits of up to $3,000.
- Modern Order of Chaldeans – Founded in Brownsburg, Indiana, in 1888. Membership was reportedly drawn from the working class. The chief officer is known as the "Grand Illuminator". Attempts to contact the order by mail in July 1923 were unsuccessful.
- Modern Order of Craftsmen – Founded in Detroit, Michigan in 1894. It provided certificates that would mature in 20 years, though paid-up members could turn them in after five. There was also a plan to loan surplus funds to members so they could buy real estate. Attempts to contact the order by mail in 1923 were unsuccessful.
- Modern Order of Praetorians
- Modern Romans – Founded in 1904. membership open to men and women. There were 2,397 members in 1923. This went down to 2,146 in 1927 and less than a thousand by 1935. Headquarters were at the Engelmen Block in Manistee, Michigan. There were 72 lodges in 1923. Officers included a supreme consul. The Roman motif was chosen because it "represented the principles of fidelity and permanence." There was a secret ritual but it "had no connection with any nationality or creed." Insurance was based on a ten-year "class system" – each class had to take care of its losses until there were less than 1,000 members in that class and then they would join the succeeding one. Protection and old age benefits were available for those over 70 but no insurance was available for children.
- Modern Samaritans – Founded in 1897 and incorporated under the laws of the state of Minnesota. By 1923 it had a benefit membership of 5,438 spread through Minnesota, Wisconsin, Michigan, North Dakota, and Washington. This dwindled to 2,918 by 1935. The highest organ of the body was the Imperial (later the Supreme) Council headquartered in the Christie Building in Duluth, Minn. In the early 1920s, there was an internal conflict with a faction based around a "Grand Council". The group's Supreme President as of 1923 was C. E. Lovett, who had been involved in fraternalism since joining the Ancient Order of United Workmen in 1873. He was considered by the Fraternal Monitor to be the longest-serving fraternalist in the country in October 1920. There were 91 lodges in 1923. Became Samaritan Life Association in 1936.
- Modern Woodmen of America
- Mystic Workers of the World – Incorporated in 1892 in Illinois. (Other sources say February 1896) Founder was C. W. Clendenen of Fulton, Illinois who was a Mason, Pythian, Maccabee and a member of both the Woodmen of the World and the Modern Woodmen of America. Membership is open to men and women men and women between 16 and 55 years old. Those unable to pass a physical examination were denied benefit membership but could become social members. Followers of the "customary list of hazardous occupations" were not eligible for membership. There were 3,000 members in the late 1890s. By 1920 it had "only a little short of 100,000 members" in 1140 lodges By 1923 the M.W.W. was reported to have 72,955 benefit members and 154 in 934 lodges spread across Illinois, Wisconsin, Michigan, Minnesota, Iowa, Nebraska, Kansas and Texas. Headquartered in Fulton, Ill, the organization was governed by a biennial Supreme Lodge. Officers included a supreme master, supreme vice-master, supreme director, supreme secretary, supreme banker, general attorney, supreme medical examiner, supreme editor, supreme conductor, supreme sentinel, and supreme picket. There was also a board of directors. At the 13th Supreme Lodge held in Omaha, Nebraska, Sept. 27–9, 1920, the American Experience Mortality table was adopted and a juvenile department was created which insured children 2–16 years of age. This was after it was discovered that the old rates would only work out if the average member lived an average of 275 years. The ritual of the order emphasized charity and was based on 1 Corinthians 13. The order's emblem consisted of two pillars topped by two globes with an open Bible, the scales of justice, and a plane and square. Archbishop Messmer of Milwaukee examined the constitution and rituals of the order and could find nothing in it that would make it objectionable to Catholics. The organization became Fidelity Life Assurance in 1930.

== N ==
- National Benevolent Society – Founded in Kansas City, Missouri in 1894. Had 2,509 members in 1897. In 1923 it had 5,558 members. At that time the society was licensed to do business in Missouri, Iowa, Minnesota, Michigan, Illinois, Indiana, Ohio, Pennsylvania, New Jersey, the District of Columbia, Virginia, West Virginia, Kentucky, Tennessee, Alabama, Arkansas, Louisiana, Texas, Oklahoma, New Mexico, Kansas, Nebraska, Colorado and South Dakota. Headquarters was at the Westover Building in Kansas City, Missouri. The order worked on the lodge system and was "purely mutual and fraternal."
- National Brotherhood of Consumers – Founded in 1918. Based in Fort Wayne, Indiana, and membership concentrated in Northern Indiana. The Supreme President in 1922 was Jesse H. Ryder. In addition to sickness, accident, and death benefits, it also worked to protect the rights of the consumer. It helped members save money on coal and groceries.
- National Fraternal League – Founded in 1902 in Green Bay, Wisconsin. The order had a tumultuous history due to its actuarial practices that did not include a table of mortality. In 1906 they used an assessment to create a surplus, but this was not adequate to finance the league. In 1913 a new class of membership was created that would include all new members as well as old members who wished to change. The new class was based on the standard NFC table of mortality. The older members resisted coming over to the new system and this led to financial problems. In 1918 there were 2,000 members in the insolvent old division and 600 in the NFC rate-paying division. In November 1918 the NFL merged into the Beaver fraternal orders. All assets of the league were taken over by the Beaver Reserve Fund Fraternity. Members who were part of the NFC division were allowed to join the Beavers National Mutual Benefit. Those over 60 and who can not pass a medical test were directed to join the Beaver Reserve Fund Fraternity.
- National Fraternal Society for the Deaf
- National Fraternal Union – Founded in 1889 in Cincinnati, Ohio. Founders included Masons, Oddfellows, and Pythians. Membership was open to men and women and stood at about 10,000 in the late 1890s. The three degrees of the ritual corresponded to the three words of its motto "Advancement, Protection and Fraternity." Its emblem was a six-pointed star containing an NFU monogram, surrounded by a chain with the order's motto. The order offered sickness, disability, and accident insurance as well as endowment funds. It was the first fraternal order to also loan surpluses to building and loan association plans. It was apparently defunct by the early 1920s.
- National Fraternity – Founded in Philadelphia in 1893 by members of the Ancient Order of United Workmen. Open to men and women 18–50 years old. There were about 3,000 members in the late 1890s. The organization was run by a Board of Control made up of the group's officers and representatives of the Sections, which were the state organizations. Local groups called Lodges. The ritual of the organization was based on American history and its emblem was the dome of the United States Capitol and its motto was "Charity, Union and Fellowship". Paid death, accident, sick and disability benefits. Paid-up members could take an endowment after five years. It was defunct by the early 1920s.
- National Home Guards – Founded in 1907. Open to men and women. Had 1,297 members in 1921, all in Pennsylvania. Headquartered in Warren, Pennsylvania.
- National Order of America – This order was incorporated in New Jersey, though it did not have an office in the state. Despite being rejected for recognition by the state, the order organized groups of foreigners in Connecticut under names like Belle Italia and President Wilson. One local in Waterbury, Connecticut, had 300 members. Members paid $17 for membership and were given elaborate illustrated certificates and ribbons and promised sick, old age, death, and endowment benefits. The organizers were arrested for conversion of funds.
- National Order of Cowboy Rangers – Founded in 1914 in Wyoming. Open to "businessmen, professional men, railroad men, ranchmen, cowboys, miners, laborers, men of leisure and honorable men in all walks of life." There were 2,025 members in 15 lodges in 1923. The national organization was called the "Supreme Ranch of the World" at 1433 Champa St. in Denver, Colorado Locals called "Ranches". Officers included "Boss of the Ranch, "Vice Boss," "Junior Past Boss," "Recorder of Brands," "Pay Boss," "Sky Pilot," "Boss of Spur," "Guard of the Corral," "Guard of the Roundup," as well as the trustees. Paid sick, accident and funeral benefits.
- National Protective Life Association – Charted in 1891, in New York as the National Protective Legion. Founders were Masons. Open to acceptable men and women. There were 4,000 members in the late 1890s. By 1923 this had risen to 14,907 benefit members and 3,200 social members and 871 members in the Juvenile Department in New York, Rhode Island, New Jersey, Pennsylvania, Delaware, Maryland, the District of Columbia, West Virginia, Kentucky, Ohio, Illinois, Michigan, California, Arizona, New Mexico, Texas, Wyoming and Kansas. Originally locals were called Legions with state organizations called Grand Legions and the overall organization the National Legion. By 1923 the organization had 372 "subordinate lodges". The Head Office remained in Waverly, New York, the same headquarters it had in the late 1890s. Offered benefits on a semi-endowment plan by which part of the death benefits could be given during life. Also offered sick and disability benefits and a cash surrender after five years. A historic building survived until 2015.
- National Provident Union – Founded in 1883 in New York. In the late 1890s, it had 10,000 members concentrated In New England and Mid-Atlantic states, particularly New York City, but was making progress in other areas of the country. It was governed by a Congress that was modeled on the United States House of Representatives. Offered sick and death benefits with the "most advanced system of assessments". It had become defunct by the early 1920s.
- National Reserve Association – Founded in 1891 in Kansas City, Missouri by F. W. Sears who was a 32-degree Mason, an Oddfellow, Pythian, and a member of several other fraternal orders besides. Membership was open to both men and women. There were about 5,000 members in the late 1890s. Offered "permanent, total and death benefits".
- National Service Life Society – Chartered in January 1917, this order was unique in that its locals, or "clubs", were based around specific demographics – farmers, businessmen, Italians, women, or men. Specific demographics within a club could form "section", and these were capable of "almost infinite subdivision". In this way, the insurance benefits could be tailored to the specific needs of the group served. The society appointed club managers, medical examiners, and secretaries, while the local clubs elected their presidents, vice presidents, treasurers, and boards of trustees. The society was also completely non-secret, even letting non-members attend their meetings. The Rochester-based society was the brainchild of James F. Egan, formerly an official of the Modern Woodmen of the World. The society, however, was not a success and was merged into the American Life Society on September 12, 1919.
- National Union – Organized May 11, 1881, in Mansfield, Ohio. Among the founders were Dr. A. E. Keyes, who had been Supreme Director of the Knights of Honor and Supreme Regent of the Royal Arcanum, N.N. Leyman who had been on the Committee of Laws of the supreme council of the Royal Arcanum, George W. Cole, Freemason, others who were experienced in fraternal affairs. Membership was open to white male citizens of good moral character, and sound bodily health aged 20–50. There were 48,000 members at the end of 1896. In 1923 this had grown to 35,118 benefit members and 250 social members in 321 locals. The highest body was the Senate, state-level organizations called Assemblies, and local organizations called Councils. In the late 1890s Assemblies had been organized for New York, New Jersey, Pennsylvania, Maryland, the District of Columbia, Virginia, West Virginia, Kentucky, North Carolina, Tennessee, Georgia, Alabama, Arkansas, Texas, New Mexico, Arizona, Colorado, Utah, California, Oregon, Washington, Montana, North Dakota, Kansas, Nebraska, Minnesota, Iowa, Missouri, Wisconsin, Michigan, Illinois, Indiana, and Ohio. Its headquarters in 1923 was the National Union Building in Toledo, Ohio. At some point the name was changed to National Union Assurance Society The group was intensely patriotic and its ritual was based on the American flag. Its emblem was a "badge representing a shield" in the national colors. It was one of the first beneficiary orders to charge different assessments for the different ages of its members. In 1896, for example, a 20-year-old would be charged 40 cents, while a 65-year-old man would be charged $2.50 (people were forbidden to join after age 50). Assessments would cease to increase after 65.
- New England Order of Protection
- New Era Association – Founded in 1897. In 1922 it had 35,958 members in Michigan and Illinois, the only states it was licensed to do business. In 1927 it had 35,216 members in 256 locals. Organization was considered democratic with the initiative, referendum and recall. Headquarters at Grand Rapids, Michigan. Had to charge extra assessments (called "loans") to cover the cost of the Influenza epidemic of 1918. The extra amount was later added to the face values of the policies.
- North American Union – Founded in 1893, incorporated in 1895, changed name to North American Union Life Assurance Society in 1925. Membership was originally open to Protestant, Catholic, and Jewish white males who could pass a medical examination. There was also a women's department. By the 1970s women had their Councils (local organizations) and the status of the racial restrictions was unclear. However, by the mid-1990s the order was open to men and women of all races. In 1923 there were 14,661 benefit members in 189 locals in Illinois, Indiana, Ohio, Michigan, Pennsylvania, New Jersey, Delaware, Maryland, and Missouri. From 1974 to 1979 it had a steady membership of 7,000. In 1994 it had 6,200. The order was governed by a supreme council and its "supreme officers" included a president, vice-president, chancellor, secretary, treasurer, and medical examiners, as well as a board of trustees. Headquarters (or "Supreme Office") were on the third floor of the Randborn Building 56 W. Randolph Street, Chicago The Unions motto was "One for all, and all for one". The organization had prayers and burial services, but no Chaplains. They claimed that they did "not interfere with any man's religion." In common with several other fraternal orders during the period the union faced a turbulent time in the late 1910sbecause of its inadequate assessment scheme as well as deaths arising out of the First World War and the Influenza epidemic of 1918. It eventually adopted the National Fraternal Congress Table of Mortality and the American Table of Mortality and this reorganization was finalized by the Supreme Council on November 19, 1918. Over time the union absorbed many smaller groups by merger or reinsurance including the Modern Aztecs and the American Fraternal League in 1905, the Church Fraternal and American Stars of Equity in 1913 and the Legion of the Red Cross and the Independent Order of Foresters of America in 1914. Over the years the union was known to sponsor recreational and leisure activities as well as civic and charitable causes "especially those promoted by the Freemasons."
- North Star Benefit Association – Founded in Moline, Illinois, in August 1899, catering mainly to the Swedish immigrant population. Open to men and women. By January 1922 there were over 7,000 members. By 1923 this had gone down to 6,083 members in 101 lodges and a Juvenile Department with 866 members in Illinois, Iowa, and Minnesota. The highest governing body was the Grand Observatory. The head of the organization was the Chief Astronomer, who was assisted by the board of directors. The headquarters were in Moline They published a periodical called North Star. The early 1920s, went through a turbulent period when the leadership tried to change the assessment system to a more actuarially sound system. By 1984 the association had changed hands twice and its insurance policies were administered by Bankers' Mutual Life Insurance Company.
- Northwestern Legion of Honor

== O ==
- Occidental Mutual Benefit Association – Founded in 1896 in Salina, Kansas. Had 3,923 members in 1921, at the time it went into receivership. Its assessment system promised that the elderly members would have free insurance and no longer need to pay assessments. However, an investigation by the Attorney General of Kansas found that monies meant for the retirement fund were misappropriated. After being put in receivership it was ordered to call a special convention so its members could decide which fraternal they merge into.
- Order of Aegis – Established in 1892 in Baltimore. Founders included Oddfellows, Pythians, and members of other fraternal orders. Membership is open to acceptable white men and women ages 16–55. Had 6,500 members in the late 1890s. The organization was governed by a biennial Supreme Lodge. The emblem was a shield bearing the stars and stripes surrounded by a scroll with the organization's motto "Fraternity, Protection, Equality, and Security". Offered sick and death benefits as well as ten-year endowments in which a member could collect on his or her benefits after ten years of membership. It was apparently defunct by the early 1920s.
- Order of Alfredians – Active in Boston, Providence, and other New England areas circa 1870s. It had "beneficiary features" but was founded "for 'the descendants of the wise and good King Alfred'". It commemorated April 23 because that was the day Alfred ascended the throne in 871. It was also William Shakespeare's birthday. According to them, Shakespeare was "the poet of all time, the embalmer of the Anglo-Saxon tongue. It was defunct by the late 1890s.
- Order of the American Fraternal Circle – Founded in Baltimore prior to 1889. It disbanded in 1894.
- Order of Americus – Founded in 1897. Admitted men and women in the Northern States, generally. Had 3,123 members in 66 lodges in 1904.
- Order of Amitie – Philadelphia-based order dissolved in 1894.
- Order of the Benevolent Union – One of several short-term endowment benefit fraternals that were popular in the 1880s and 1890s and then went bankrupt.
- Order of Chosen Friends
- Order of the Continental Fraternal Union – Established in 1890 in Richmond, Indiana. Among the founders were Freemasons, Oddfellows, members of the Royal Arcanum, Knights of Honor, and the Ancient Order of American Workmen. Open to men and women. Had approximately 3,000 members in the late 1890s. Its emblem was a shield with clasped hands with the letters U.H.F. above and the word "Union" below. It offered sickness and death benefits, attempting to charge as near the actual cost as possible. They were apparently defunct by the early 1920s.
- Order of Equity – Founded in 1889 in Indianapolis. Founders included Freemasons, Pythians, and Oddfellows. Open to men and women. Had about 4,000 members scattered over 20 states, though concentrated in the Midwest. Ritual based on the Biblical stories of the Good Samaritan and the healing of the lepers. The order paid sick, temporary disability, and funeral benefits, as well as operating as a short-term assessment society, i.e., members in the order for a specified amount of time could cash in their certificates. The order went into receivership in March 1897 owing $72,000 to certificate holders while only having $35,000 in assets.
- Order of the Fraternal Circle – One of many short-term endowment benefit fraternals that were popular in the 1880s and 1890s and then went bankrupt.
- Order of the Golden Chain – Founded December 22, 1881, in Baltimore. Founding members included Masons, members of the Knights of Honor, the American Legion of Honor, and the Royal Arcanum. Open to men 21–55 years old. There were 11,000 members in the late 1890s. The ritual was based on the idea of a "golden chain of friendship", as illustrated in the Orders emblem: twelve links of a gold chain surrounding the letters O.G.C. with the motto of the society written in Greek (sources do not identify the motto). Paid life, sick, and total disability benefits. Apparently defunct by the early 1920s.
- Order of Golden Links – Founded in Wheeling, West Virginia, in 1905. Open to men and women. Merged with the American Insurance Union in 1921. Had a membership of 1,029 in 1921.
- Order of the Golden Rod – Founded in 1894 in Detroit. Founding members included members of the Woodmen of the World, Maccabees, International Fraternal Alliance, National Dotare, Royal Adelphia, Order of Vesta, and Order of the Orient. The order had a unique assessment plan issuing $50 certificates to its members and then assessing them 25 cents per week. Apparently defunct by the early 1920s.
- Order of Heptasophs
- Order of Home Builders – Founded January 25, 1890, and charted by the Pennsylvania Department of State. Open to men and women 15–65. Paid $500, $250, and $150 death benefits based on age. Sick benefits of $7 a week, as well as short-term endowments.
- Order of Iron Hall – Founded December 1881 in Indianapolis. Originally only open to men, but women were later accepted as social members, and as full members by the time of the Order's demise. The age limits of the order were 18–65. The order had about 125,000 members throughout its existence, with a high of 70,000 to 63,000 when it went into receivership in August 1892. The organization was doomed by its assessment system which required each member to recruit four more and gained money by losing members. By the time of its demise, it had lost $100,000.
- Order of the Iroquois – Founded June 26, 1896, in Buffalo, New York. One of its charter members was John E. Pound, Past Supreme Regent of the Royal Arcanum. Open to men 20–55. By 1923 it had 666 benefit members and 20,000 social members distributed across 20 lodges. The order was governed by a supreme lodge, states were organized into Grand Lodges and locals were called Subordinate Lodges. The organization's headquarters was the Iroquois Building, Buffalo, New York. Officers included a supreme secretary. The ritual of the organization was based on the "name and fame" of the Iroquois confederacy. The emblem of the order was a portrait of Red Jacket, an important Iroquois leader of the early 19th century. The first lodge was named Red Jacket #1. In August 1922 it merged with the Fraternal Home Insurance Society of Philadelphia.
- Order of Liberty – Philadelphia-based order. Had 1,100 benefit members were in was re-insured by the Fraternal Home Insurance Society of Philadelphia in early 1922.
- Order Knights of Friendship – Originally conceived by Dr. Mark G. Kerr, MD in 1857, the first local of this order, the Harmony Chamber #1 in Philadelphia was established in January 1859. During the Civil War, nearly all of the members of the order went off to fight and the order had to be reorganized after the war. The order was open to men who believed in a supreme being. There were 4,000 members in the late 1890s, concentrated in Pennsylvania and New Jersey. In 1920 it was reported to have 20,000 members in 114. At that time the Orders Director-General resided at Reading, Pennsylvania The order worked three degrees – Knight Junior, Knight Bachelor, and Knight Errant. The order's emblem is a triangle in a circle, a pot, bows, and arrows, and crossed swords. The order's only beneficiary feature was a funeral benefit fund.
- Order of Knights of St. Joseph – Founded in 1896. In 1923 it had 11,729 members in 70 lodges. Its headquarters were at Society for Savings Building in Cleveland. It issued certificates of $500 only.
- Order of Mutual Aid – A southern offshoot of the AOUW and the Knights of Honor, the order was established in Memphis, Tennessee, in the mid-1870s but collapsed in the wake of the yellow fever outbreak there in 1878. Its remaining members formed the Knights of the Golden Rule and the Order of Mutual Protection.
- Order of Mutual Protection – Founded in St. Louis in 1878 by remnants of the Order of Mutual Aid. Membership was open to men and women 18–55 in good health and not engaged in hazardous professions. Stevens states that they did not accept members in the Southern states except for Kentucky, West Virginia, Virginia, Maryland, and the District of Columbia. However Preuss states that they did no accept members north of the 31st parallel. There were 5,000 members in the late 1890s. By the early 1920s this had grown to 5,594 benefit members and 73 social members in 51 lodges. Locals were called Subordinate Lodges and the overall organization was the supreme lodge. In the late 1890s, the office of the Supreme Secretary was located in Chicago. In the early 1920s the address of the supreme lodge was at 159 North State Street, Chicago. The order offered death benefits of $500, $1000, and $2000, but $1000 was open to women and saloon keepers. On total disability, a member was offered one-half the value of his or her certificate, and the full value upon reaching the age of 70. Sick benefits were issued at the discretion of the Subordinate Lodges. The initiation ritual involved the initiate placing his hand on a Bible on an altar in front of the chaplain and swearing never to divulge the secrets of the order.
- Order of the Orient – Name of at least two orders. One was a Michigan-based order that went into receivership in 1895. However, another Order of the Orient was active in Wisconsin and the Upper Michigan peninsula.
- Order of Pendo – Stevens reports in the late 1890s that this order was incorporated in the State of California and headquartered in San Francisco. Preuss was unable to get in contact with it in 1923.
- Order of Pente – Founded in 1888 in Philadelphia. Membership was open to men and women between 16 and 65. Had 7,000 members, mostly in Pennsylvania, in the late 1890s. The seal of the order was a five-pointed star inscribed with a pentagon. Founders included Freemasons, Oddfellows, Pythians, and members of the Grand Army of the Republic. The name was related to the insurance scheme of the order which included a five-year maturing certificate. Attempts to contact the order by mail in August 1923 were returned as unclaimed.
- Order of the Red Cross and Knights of the Red Cross – Established in 1879. Founding members were also members of the Ancient Order of United Workmen, among other fraternal beneficiary societies. Had 7,000 members in the late 1890s, concentrated in the Midwest. Ritual based on Biblical incidents. Motto "Omnia pro charitas". The emblem was a crowned red Greek cross with a white five-pointed star in the middle surrounded by a blue band with the order's motto on it.
- Order of the Royal Argosy – Founded in San Francisco in 1888. Stevens was unable to trace it in the late 1890s.
- Order of the Royal Ark – One of many short-term endowment benefit fraternals that were popular in the 1880s and 1890s and then went bankrupt.
- Order of the Sanhedrim – Founded July 26, 1887, in Detroit, Michigan, as a beneficiary society for members of the press. Membership was divided into "Priests, Elders, and Scribes" as well as "'one who sits in Moses' seat'". Locals were called subordinates or little Sanhedrims. Above them were the State Sanhedrims and the Supreme Sanhedrim. Preuss was unable to trace it in 1923.
- Order of Select Friends – Founded in 1888. Membership was open to men and women ages 18 to fifty except those living in states affected by the yellow fever epidemic and those in extra-hazardous occupations. It had 5,000 members in the late 1890s, the "relatively larger portion being in Kansas." In 1901 it had 3,600 members left scattered throughout Kansas, Missouri, and Colorado. Locals were called subordinate Lodges while the overall organization was the supreme lodge. Motto "Friendship, Hope and Protection". Paid sick, disability, and old age benefits. Issued death benefit certificates of $1,000, $2,000, and $3,000 paid with graded assessments according to age at the time of joining (for instance, 35 cents of $1,000 for 18, 75 cents for 50) which could not be increased. The order went into receivership by order of the Kansas Insurance Commissioner in 1901 went it owed $15,000 more than it had in assets. The initial receiver was C.C. Dutton of Erie. It was speculated that the order might be merged with a new group called the American Crusaders.
- Order of Shepherds of Bethlehem – Founded "in America" in Trenton, New Jersey, on November 19, 1896, by Ira A. A. Wycoff. Supposedly the group was originally introduced to America by a Sir Fred Holt who established two lodges in New York in 1875. However, after Holt was recalled to Europe because of his duties as "Grand Scribe" of the "Sovereign Lodge", the order the lodges "quarreled, and under a strange name ran on for a time, then died out, except for a few small Western Lodges that had their start from them and drifted into another small order not connected with this". After this, an unnamed antiquarian was supposed to have gone to the Holy Land and studied with the Shepherds there. "He learned all the old legends and methods of the Order, and on his return presented the Order in the thoroughly original form, translated and put into modern shape." By arrangement with the Sovereign Lodge, the new Supreme Lodge of North America was authorized. Membership was open to men and women 18–55. It had 2,000 members in the late 1890s. By the early 1920s this had grown to 27,950 members in 265 lodges. Headquarters were at 927 N. 5th Street, Camden, New Jersey. The order worked three degrees – Light, Shepherds, and Disciples. Members called each other Sir and Lady. The order offered sick and death benefits. By the early 1920s it operated a home for aged members and orphans of members.
- Order of the Solid Rock – Founded in 1889. One of many short-term endowment fraternities that tried to pay back certificates of $100 to $1000 but soon became insolvent after the first set of certificate holders attempted to collect. Many people lost money on these schemes which became popular for a short time and then folded after a few years.
- Order of Solon – Organized in Pittsburgh in 1879. One of many short-term endowments that became popular for a while in the 1880s and 1890s then went bankrupt.
- Order of the Sons of Progress – Organized in Philadelphia in 1879. One of many short-term endowments that became popular for a while in the 1880s and 1890s then went bankrupt.
- Order of Sparta – Founded in Philadelphia in 1879 by members of the Ancient Order of United Workmen. Membership is open to Christian men between 21 and 50 in good physical health. It was restricted to the areas within 100 miles of Philadelphia. Had 7,000 members in the late 1890s. On January 1, 1915, the order had 2,104 benefit members in good standing. Locals were called Senates and the central organization was called the "Great Senate". There were 21 subordinate Senates on January 1, 1914. Rituals were based on the history of ancient Sparta. Had a permanent fund to pay the assessments of those who were members for 25 years and a relief fund for those who could not pay their assessments through sickness or financial disability. In 1916 the order was declared insolvent and placed in receivership after members who had been in the order for over 25 years, demanded their assessments be paid out of the general fund and objected to a new assessment being levied on them. The order, however, was reversed by the Superior Court of Pennsylvania. Nevertheless, the order filed for bankruptcy in December of that year, leading to a federal case that decided unincorporated entities were liable for bankruptcy.
- Order of the Totine – A Pennsylvania-based fraternal benefit that was "assigned" in 1895 and its assets divided among its 15,000 members.
- Order of the Triangle – Mentioned in the 1890 census as a mutual assessment fraternity operating out of Brooklyn. They could not be traced by the late 1890s.
- Order of True Friends – Founded in 1886 in New York. It paid death benefits of $200 and weekly sick benefits of $2.50 to $5 using mutual assessments. Could not be contacted by mail in the late 1890s.
- Order of United Artisans – Founded in 1894. Had 17,242 members in 263 lodges in 1923. Headquartered in the six-story United Artisans Building at the corner of Broadway and Oak Street in Portland, Oregon. Had a Juvenile Department for children of members under 18. They were eligible for $200 for the first four years after turning 18 to attend a state college. Another establishment was an Artisan Home for aged and dependent members, that was also open to returning veterans of the First World War.
- Order of United Friends
- Order of United Commercial Travelers of America
- Order of Unity – Founded in Philadelphia in 1889. Open to men and women. There were 2,500 members in the late 1890s. The order claimed to be non-sectarian and its ritual "teaches strength in union, justice to all, and protection through fraternity." Paid death benefits from $500 to $1,000 and weekly sick benefits from $2.50 to $20. It had probably disbanded by 1923.
- Order of Vesta – One of many short-term mutual assessment fraternals that became popular in the late 1880s and early 1890s that were popular for a short time, then went under. This order's membership was concentrated in Pennsylvania where the order made an "assignment" in 1895 and then wound up.
- Order of the World – Founded in Wheeling, West Virginia March 7, 1893. There were 16,000 members in the late 1890s. Its goals included advancing the social and moral condition of its members, assisting them in obtaining employment, caring for the sick and disabled, burying the dead, and providing for the widows and orphans of members. Despite this, it was not considered a mutual benefit order. Fraternal benefits were available to its members though, through the World Mutual Benefit Association.
- Order of the World (Boston) – One of many short-term endowment benefit fraternals that were popular in the 1880s and 1890s and then went bankrupt.

== P ==
- Patriarchal Circle of America – Organized in Milwaukee in 1880 as a side degree of the Independent Order of Odd Fellows to confer "the new degrees of Uniformed Patriarchs." It was repudiated by the Sovereign Grand Lodge of the I.O.O.F. in 1885. It had 3,000 members in the late 1880s. A female auxiliary existed called the Circle of the Golden Band. Locals of both groups are called Temples. The organization was militaristic, with tactics for drilling and sword exercises. Worked three degrees – Prepatary, Perfection, and the Patriarchal Feast and Knighthood. The first two were written by co-founded Newell Daniels in 1893, while the final degree was written by Supreme Secretary G. C. Ridings. The organization's colors were royal purple and gold and its emblem was three interlocking links forming a triangle with the words "Honest, Fraternity, and Fidelity." The Circle provided life insurance for its male members based on mutual assessments, and local Temples had the option of providing sickness and funeral benefits. The Temples of the Circle of the Golden Band had the option to create life insurance, and sick and death benefits. Arthur Preuss was unable to get in touch with them in the early 1920s.
- People's Favorite Order – One of many short-term endowment benefit fraternals that were popular in the 1880s and 1890s and then went bankrupt.
- People's Five Year Benefit Order – One of many short-term endowment benefit fraternals that were popular in the 1880s and 1890s and then went bankrupt.
- People's Mutual Life Insurance Order – A short-term order listed in the 1890 census as being based in Nashville, Tennessee. Founded in 1882. Unknown if it lasted into the late 1890s.
- Pioneer Fraternal Organization – Founded in Wawanesa, Manitoba, in 1892. By the 1960s had 1,600 members including juveniles. Merged in 1972 with Wawanesa Mutual Life Insurance Co. Provided aid to mentally challenged children and scholarships.
- Polish Roman Catholic Union of America – Founded in 1873. In 1972 the PRCUA had 887 lodges. Members join PRCUA primarily by purchasing life insurance and/or annuity certificates from the organization. Members participate in activities such as folk dancing and singing, language classes, crafts, and youth festivals through local lodges. PRCUA also extends residential mortgage loans to its members.
- Progressive Endowment Guild of America – Chartered by the Legislature of Virginia. Founders included Freemasons, Pythians, and members of the Royal Arcanum. Membership is open to white men and women 18–65. Had 5,000 members in the late 1890s. Locals called Subordinate Chapters; its highest organ is the supreme chapter. Administered by a supreme executive committee between sessions of the former. While claiming not to be a secret society, it had obligations, signs for recognizing members, and "private work". Had three classes of membership: Class for members 18-who were issued certificates of $500 to $5,000 upon 10 years membership or death. Class B for those 50 to 58, or who live in a dangerous area or have a hazardous profession. They receive the same benefits, except in the case of death their heirs would receive only one tenth of the face values of their certification. Suicides are treated as being in Class B. Class C is open to people 59–65, or who could not or would not take a physical examination. They only received the amount of their assessments at the time of death. Gov. Charles T. O'Ferrall was a member.
- Progressive Order of the West – Founded 1896. Had 12,412 members in 1923, 4,372 of which were in Missouri. Headquarters in St. Louis. Operated on the usual lodge system and had 93 lodges in 1923. Did business in Missouri, Illinois, Wisconsin, Pennsylvania, New Jersey, Maryland, and Texas.
- Protected Fireside Circle – Organized in Detroit, Michigan, this was a "social beneficiary secret society for men and women." Arthur Preuss was unable to get in touch with them in the early 1920s.
- Protected Home Circle – Founded in Sharon, Pennsylvania, in 1886. Founders included Oddfellows, as well as members of the Equitable Aid Union and the National Union. Admitted both men and women to membership. Those who worked in especially hazardous occupations had to pay special rates. Had 2,000 members in the late 1890s with members "as far west of Missouri and as far north as Michigan." In 1923 they were reported to have 531 a benefit membership of 122,825 and a social membership of 602 and did business in New York, Pennsylvania, Ohio, Indiana, Illinois, Michigan, Missouri, Kansas, Virginia, West Virginia, the District of Columbia and Alabama. Had 131,000 members in 1929. Headquarters reported to be Sharon, Pennsylvania, in the late 1890s. The office of the supreme circle reported more specifically as 30 E. State Street, Sharon, Pennsylvania in 1923. Local groups were called Circles and the order was governed by the supreme circle that consisted of the order's founders, representatives of the subordinate Circles, and other elected members. In 1923 there was a "Junior Circle Degree" and a side degree "Kibosh", granted by the "Inner Circle." It had a ritual based on the Bible and its motto was "Safety, Economy, Fidelity, Purity." Its emblems included a monogram of the letters P, H, and C as well as an eagle perched on the edge of a nest guarding its young. Paid total and permanent disability and death benefits based on a six-class scale based on age, rate, and risk. 25% of membership dues went into a reserve fund and maintained a fixed rate of assessments and a definite number of annual assessments. After five years any member may take that portion of the reserve fund to which they are due. Became Protected Home Mutual Life Insurance Co. in 1964.
- Protected Knights of America – An attempt to create a mutual assessment order in the states of Texas, Louisiana, and Mississippi area. However, the Knights became insolvent as they issued 7,800 certificates, and then suffered 50 deaths. The mortality losses from November 1901 to January 1902 were described as "appalling". Chapter after chapter had to be suspended until the Knights were down to 2,000 members with $25,000 in debt. The Supreme Protector had to have the order merged by another group called the American Guild that was supposedly more stable.
- Provident League of America – Detroit-based mutual assessment order, mentioned in the 1890 census. The post officials were unable to locate them in the late 1890s. Preuss assumed they were probably extinct in the early 1920s.
- Prudent Patricians of Pompeii – Chartered by an Act of Congress on March 4, 1897. The PPP was the first fraternal benefit society so chartered. It was founded by Dennis T. Flynn, Oklahoma Territory's delegate in Congress, George A. Reynolds the Grand Secretary of the Benevolent and Protective Order of Elks, Philip Walker Grand Vice-Regent of the Royal Arcanum and W. J. Palmer Past Noble Grand Manchester Unity, Independent Order of Odd Fellows. The president was W. S. Linton, Past Grand Commander of the Knights of the Maccabees, and the office of the orders "prothonotary" was at Saginaw, Michigan. Membership was open to white persons of both sexes. The goals were to offer death and disability insurance, assist each other in finding employment, aid each other in business, and educate its members socially, morally, and intellectually. Members over 70 years of age no longer had to pay assessments, but could still receive benefits. The postmaster of Saginaw was unable to locate them in June 1923.

== R ==
- Royal Adelphia – Founded in Detroit in 1883. Became defunct ten years later. Offered death benefits of $1,000, $2,000 and $3,000 and sick benefits of $15 weekly. "Some of its members were identified with the National Dotare or Order of the Golden Rod".
- Royal Aid Society – Founded in Lynn, Massachusetts, in early 1896. Unusual in that it charged a flat rate of $1.50 per thousand dollars of insurance, while other orders were moving to a graded assessment based on age. A letter addressed to the secretary by Arthur Preuss in August 1923 was returned as undeliverable, leading him to speculate that it was defunct.
- Royal Arcanum
- Royal Benefit Society – Founded in 1893 in New York. Founders included Freemasons, Oddfellows, Pythians, and members of the Royal Arcanum. Membership is open to men and women. Had 3,000 members in the late 1890s. Issued $250 to $3,000 certificates payable at death or the end of 10, 15, or 20 years. There were also weekly sick and accident benefits. Paid-up benefits could be issued anytime after three years and cash surrenders after 5. Tended more toward the financial than the social or fraternal aspect of secret societies. Had a very "plain and bushiness-like" ritual.
- Royal Fraternal Guardians – Founded in San Francisco in December 1895. Apparently defunct by the early 1920s.
- Royal Fraternity – Founded October 16, 1896, in Minneapolis by N. W. Bloss, C. F. Underhill and H. W. Hatch. Women were not eligible for membership. Had a total membership of 1,500 less than a year after it was founded. The emblem was composed of three triangles forming a nine-pointed star "with other details understood only members."
- The Royal Guardians
- Royal Highlanders (fraternal order) – Founded 1896. Membership is open to men and women. Had 28,897 members in 1917. This was an increase of 56 members, despite having lost six lodges during the same period. Had 20,768 benefit and 121 social members in 375 lodges in 1923. In 1923 the Executive Castle was located at 422 Terminal Building Lincoln, Nebraska. In 1917, the organization's chief secretary was F. J. Sharpe of Aurora, Nebraska. Ritual based on Scottish history and included an elaborate vow of secrecy that was eventually leaked to the Christian Cynosure. Involved in lengthy litigation over the changes in its assessment rates. Also involved in investments on first mortgages in Nebraska farmland. In 20 years they never had a loss in interest or principle and never had to foreclose a mortgage despite charging higher interests than usual.
- Royal Knights of King David – This order is mentioned in the census of 1890, but Stevens could not find any evidence of its continued existence in the late 1890s, nor could Preuss in the early 1920s.
- Royal League (fraternal order) – Founded in Chicago in 1883 as a splinter group of the Royal Arcanum. Membership was open to acceptable men aged 18–46 years old who were not employed in a hazardous occupation. Had 14,000 members in 1896. Had 21,843 benefit and 142 social members in 1923. Headquarters as of 1923 at 1554 Ogden Avenue, Chicago. By 1923 it had a female auxiliary called the Ladies of the Royal League The league was incorporated in Illinois and operated in Indiana, Ohio, Michigan, Minnesota, Wisconsin, and states west of the Mississippi and north of the 36th parallel. The national organization was called the Supreme Council, state organizations were called advisory councils. Motto "Virtue, Mercy and Charity". Differed from Royal Arcanum in that it offered $2,000 or $4,000 certificates to the dependents on the death of its members, whereas, the Arcanum only offered $3,000. The league also offered a $50 or $25 per week permanent disability benefit. Among its fraternal features, were debates, public readings of papers, and "other entertainments". Founded the Fellowship Sanatorium in Black Mountain, North Carolina, in 1904, the first sanatorium owned by a fraternal organization. The Fellowship Sanatorium burned down on February 15, 1920. None of the 35 patients were hurt and the league vowed to rebuild the sanatorium.
- Royal Neighbors of America
- Royal Society of Good Fellows – Founded in 1882 in Rhode Island. Founders included Masons, Oddfellows, Knights of Honor, and members of the AOUW and the Royal Arcanum. Membership was open to men and women. The order had about 15,000 members concentrated in New England and the "Middle States" in the late 1890s. The office of the premier, the society's chief executive officer, was located in New York. The society's emblem was a crown surmounted by a Latin cross surrounded by a ring of 12 tangent circles with the letters spelling "Good Fellows" in 11 and a five-pointed star in the twelfth.
- Royal Standard of America – A mutual assessment society that was based in Jersey City, New Jersey, in the late 1890s. It could not be located in 1923 and Arthur Preuss felt it was probably extinct.
- Royal Tribe of Joseph – Incorporated in the State of Missouri in April 1894. Membership was open to white men ages 21–60, socially and otherwise acceptable to the membership, who were able to read and write, believed in a supreme being, were not involved in the liqueur trade, and could pass a physical examination. It would also not accept those engaged in "extra-hazardous" occupations, such as railway brakemen, or lived in unhealthy areas such as the states south of Virginia, Ohio, Indiana, Illinois, or Missouri. The Tribe had 3,000 members in the US and Canada in 1899. Headquarters at Sedalia, Missouri. The Tribe was organized in the usual way with the highest organ being the supreme lodge, with state-level Grand Lodges and local subordinate lodges. Ritual based on the Biblical story of Joseph, his interpretation of the Pharaoh's dream, and advice to store up crops for the seven lean years. This was declared the world's first insurance scheme. In 1923 Arthur Preuss sent an inquiry to Sedalia about the state of the Tribe, but it was returned as undeliverable. The Tribe was not mentioned in the 1921–22 Missouri Red Book. Preuss assumed that the Tribe had become defunct.

== S ==
- Seven Stars of Consolidation – Organized in Hearne, Texas, in the mid-1880s. Could not be traced in the mid-1890s.
- Sexennial League – Founded in Philadelphia on July 18, 1888, by David C. Reynolds. The name came from its unique assessment system – after six years of membership, one could reap their benefits, or remain in the order. The league was credited by the American supplement to the Encyclopædia Britannica for popularizing this concept among American fraternals. Membership is open to men and women. Had 25,000 members in 1899. The supreme lodge was based in Philadelphia, locals were called subordinate lodges. The league's ritual was based on the life of Archimedes and his statement "Give me a fulcrum on which to rest, and I will move the Earth". The league's emblem showed Archimedes with the fulcrum, lever, and earth.
- Shield of Honor – Founded in 1877 by John W. Meeks, W. J. Cunningham and Henry Duvall in Baltimore. Open to acceptable white men. Had 14,000 members in the late 1890s, concentrated in Maryland and Pennsylvania. Had 9,942 in 1910. By 1923 this had fallen to 3,373 benefit and 175 social members in 58 lodges and was licensed to do business in Maryland, the District of Columbia, Delaware, Pennsylvania, West Virginia, New Jersey, and New York. Headquarters in 1923 were at 619 Paul Street, Baltimore. Locals called Subordinate Lodges, and the national organization the supreme lodge. Ritual "based on an incident in the life of a prominent character in the Old Testament". The identity of this person was suggested by the orders emblem which was a sword and a bow and arrow over a Bible with an hourglass. Subordinate lodges handled sick benefits at their discretion and death benefits were handled by the national organization. Apparently became defunct by 1930.
- Society of Select Guardians – A short-term or endowment order that issued certificates of from $100 to $1,000 payable after seven years, as well as death benefits of $500, $1,000, or $2,000. "It was as prominent as elsewhere in Newark, New Jersey. It was apparently defunct by 1923.
- Sons and Daughters of America – Based in Fall River, Massachusetts. One of many short-term endowment benefit fraternals that were popular in the 1880s and 1890s and then went bankrupt.
- Sons and Daughters of Justice – Founded in 1897, this order was restricted to the state of Kansas, and its members were "selected with care." After adopting a system of insurance based on the National Fraternal Congress of America rate table to keep the order solvent. However, this caused a backlash from members who wished to keep the old plan and the finances of the order went into disarray. The order eventually had to merge into the Columbian Circle.
- Sons and Daughters of Protection – Founded in 1896. Had 1,825 members in 1905. Headquarters in Lincoln, Nebraska. Appears to have become defunct by 1910.
- Supreme Commandery of Universal Brotherhood – Founded by G. F. Bowles at Natchez, Mississippi. Paid sick, accident, disability, annuity, old age, and death benefits. It was unique in that membership was open to both blacks and whites and to both sexes. Had 9,000 members in the late 1890s. Headquarters in Natchez. Arthur Preuss was unable to make contact with it in 1923.

== T ==
- Templars of Liberty – Reported active in New York and Brooklyn in the late 1890s. It was "believed to have been beneficiary and patriotic in its objects."
- Tribe of Ben-Hur
- Travelers Protective Association of America

== U ==
- Union Beneficial Association – Headquartered in Trenton, New Jersey, in 1896. Apparently extinct by 1923.
- Union Endowment – One of many short-term endowment benefit fraternals that were popular in the 1880s and 1890s and then went bankrupt.
- United Ancient Order of Druids
- United Benevolent Association – Organized in 1895, this order confined its activities to the State of Texas. Its reserve fund was hard hit by influenza in 1920. In November of that year, a special assessment had to be raised on the membership of 6,267. By early 1922 it was down to 4,000 members and agreed to merge into the Fraternal Aid Union of Lawrence, Kansas. Its Supreme Lodge met biennially and elected a supreme president and supreme secretary. In between sessions, the association was run by an executive committee.
- United Endowment League – One of many short-term endowment benefit fraternals that were popular in the 1880s and 1890s and then went bankrupt.
- United Friends of Michigan
- United Order of America – Founded in Los Angeles in the mid-1890s. Probably extinct by 1923.
- United Order of Equity – One of many short-term endowment benefit fraternals that were popular in the 1880s and 1890s and then went bankrupt.
- United Order of Independent Odd Ladies – A New England–based mutual assessment benefit order. Could not be traced in the late 1890s.
- United Order of Hope – The address of the supreme lodge of this order was in St. Louis, Missouri in the mid-1890s. Its emblem was an O and H monogram and an anchor. There were no replies to inquiries by Albert Clark Stevens in the late 1890s. Arthur Preuss was unable to trace it in 1923.
- United Order of Pilgrim Fathers – Founded in the early fall of 1878 by a group of gentlemen and their wives, some of whom were already Masons, Oddfellows, members of the Royal Arcanum, Knights of Honor, Ancient Order of United Workmen and other fraternal orders decided to form an insurance order that would be limited to the states of New England. After several meetings, a constitution, ritual, and organizational plans were drawn up. The first local group, or colony, was established at Lawrence, Massachusetts, on February 15, 1879, and was christened "Mayflower". Membership was open to men and women between 18 and 50. There were 21,463 members in 193 Colonies on December 31, 1896. Membership was 23,000 in 1898 and 18,000 in 1910. The order's highest organ was the supreme colony, which was composed of the order's incorporators, a representative from each subordinate colony, and a delegate representing each group of 100 members. The supreme colony met annually and elected a board of directors consisting of a supreme governor, supreme lieutenant governor, supreme treasurer, and five trustees, who governed the order between meetings of the supreme colony.
- United States Benevolent Fraternity – Name of at least two Baltimore-based organizations. One was established in 1890 and disbanded in 1894. A longer-lasting one was established on February 22, 1881, by Thomas H. McGechin. It was open to white men and women and had 1,000 members in the late 1890s. Paid death, total disability, and annuity benefits. Claimed to be the "lineal descendent" of the Royal Arcanum and the American Legion of Honor.

== V ==
- V.A.S. – Founded in Grinnell, Iowa, in 1879. Initials stood for the Latin vera amicitia sempiterna est – true friendship lasts forever. Operations are limited to Iowa. Had a graded assessment benefit plan, paying out $2,000 per death benefit. Merged with the Security Life Association of Clinton, Iowa in 1891. The successor organization was said to be a "small insurance company in Washington, Iowa.
- Vesta Circle – Commenced business on August 6, 1901. Admitted men and women 16-55. Had 4,036 benefit and 100 social members in 55 lodges in 1917. Operated in Ohio, Indiana, Illinois, Michigan, Wisconsin, Minnesota, Iowa, and all states west of the Mississippi north of the 36th parallel. Officers included the supreme archon, supreme scribe, supreme treasurer, supreme medical examiner, and general counsel. Headquarters were at 1619 Masonic Temple, Chicago. Merged with the American Insurance Union in 1917.

== W ==
- Western Knights Protective Association – Founded in Saint Charles, Minnesota, which also served as its headquarters. Open to acceptable white persons 18-54. Local groups, called Assemblies, were grouped into Grand Assemblies, and the whole was governed by a supreme assembly made of the original incorporators and representatives from the Grand Assemblies. Paid death benefits by way of a fixed monthly, quarterly, semi-annual, and annual payment, or by a single paid-up "benefit bond." Preuss was unable to trace it in 1923.
- Western Samaritans Life Association – Founded in 1922 in Illinois. Membership is limited to "acceptable white persons of good moral character, sound bodily health and engaged in a reputable business." Had 526 benefit members in 6 branches or "Wards" in 1923. In 1927, in Illinois only, the order had 2,312 members, 671 of whom were social members without insurance. Appears to have disappeared by 1935. Its headquarters, in 1923, were at 3066 E. 92nd Street, Chicago. The organization claimed it had no "secret features".
- WoodmenLife – formerly the Woodmen of the World
- Workmen's Benefit Association – an adjunct to the Ancient Order of United Workmen which provided benefits in addition to the ones the AOUW paid.

== Benefit appendages of non-benefit order ==
- Ancient Order of Shepherds – Founded in 1902, acted as 3rd degree of Foresters of America. Open to both men and women. Headquarters in Chicago. in 1905 had 708 members.
- Elks Mutual Benefit Association
- Masonic Life Association – Founded in 1872. Reorganized on a more sound financial basis in 1919. Membership in 1923 was 18,825. Home Office in 1923 was at 452 Delaware Avenue, Buffalo, New York.
- Masonic Mutual Life Association -
- Triple Link Mutual Indemnity Association – Incorporated in the State of Illinois in 1890. Created to provide insurance for members of the Independent Order of Odd Fellows and the Daughters of Rebekah who were under 60. Headquarters in Chicago. Mutual assessments were graded by age.
- Woodchopper's Association – Founded April 22, 1890, in Philadelphia by members of the Court Philadelphia, Foresters of America. A governing body was founded on March 22, 1893. Membership is limited to members of the Foresters of America. In 1899 they had about 3,500 members in 70 locals, known as Cabins. There was no sick or death benefit at the national level but each Cabin had the right to create a benefit option if they liked.

== Bibliography ==
=== Reference Works ===
- Axelrod, Alan International Encyclopedia of Secret Societies and Fraternal Orders New York; Facts on File, Inc 1997
- Preuss, Arthur A Dictionary of Secret and other Societies St. Louis, B. Herder Book Co. 1924
- Rosen, Peter The Catholic church and secret societies Milwaukee : Cannon Printing 1904
- Schmidt, Alvin J. Fraternal Orders Westport, CT: Greenwood Press, 1980
- Stevens, Albert C., ed. (1899). The Cyclopædia of Fraternities; a compilation of existing authentic information and the results of original investigation as to more than six hundred secret societies in the United States (1st ed.). New York City; Paterson, NJ: Hamilton Printing and Publishing Company. LCCN 99001908. OCLC 3796387. OL 23292199M – via HathiTrust.

=== Periodicals ===
- The Christian Cynosure, a periodical published by the National Christian Association that was opposed to fraternal orders.
- The Fortnightly Review, a Catholic periodical that, among other things, carried news on fraternal groups, which it opposed.
- The Fraternal Monitor, a trade magazine, published by the National Fraternal Congress of America
- "Statistics, Fraternal Societies". National Fraternal Congress of America.

== See also ==
- List of American ethnic and religious fraternal orders
- List of friendly and benefit societies
