= List of friendly and benefit societies =

A friendly society or benefit society is a voluntary association formed to provide mutual aid and benefit, for instance, insurance for relief from sundry difficulties. These groups are also known as a fraternal benefit society, fraternal benefit order, or mutual aid organization. The following is an incomplete list of these societies and orders.

== International ==
- Foresters Financial (Canada, UK, US)
- Girls' Friendly Society (UK and others)
- Independent Order of Rechabites (UK and others)
- International Order of Twelve Knights and Daughters of Tabor (US and others)
- Irish National Foresters (Ireland and others)
- Knights of Columbus (US and others)
- Knights of Peter Claver (US and others)
- Saint Andrew's society (countries with Scottish diaspora)

=== Defunct ===
- Ancient Order of United Workmen
- Knights of the Maccabees
- Order of Chosen Friends
- Sons of Temperance

== Australia ==
- Australian Unity
- Benevolent Society

=== Defunct ===
- Australasian Dramatic and Musical Association (1871-1940)
- Australasian Women's Association (1900-?)
- Australian Natives' Association (1871-2007?)
- Hibernian Australasian Catholic Benefit Society (1868-?)
- Protestant Alliance Friendly Society (1972-1948?)
- Tredegar Medical Aid Society (1890-1994)

== Barbados ==
- Mosaic Templars of America

== Canada ==
- Benevolent Irish Society
- Canadian Order of Chosen Friends
- Sons of Norway
- Teachers Life

=== Defunct ===
- Canadian Fraternal Association (1891–2016)
- Knights of the Maccabees
- Umberto Primo Society

== New Zealand ==
- Hibernian Catholic Benefit Society

== United Kingdom ==
- Ancient Order of Druids
- Benenden Health
- Exeter Friendly Society
- Foresters Friendly Society
- Grand United Order of Oddfellows
- Harting Old Club
- Healthy Investment
- Independent Order of Oddfellows Manchester Unity
- National Friendly
- Order of Druids
- Police Mutual
- Presbyterian Mutual
- Shepherds Friendly Society
- Scottish Friendly
- Teachers Assurance

=== Defunct ===
- Lancashire and Cheshire Miners' Permanent Relief Society (1872-?)
- Royal Liver Assurance (1850-2011)

== United States ==
- Aid Association of Lutherans
- Artisans Order of Mutual Protection
- Bohemian Citizens' Benevolent Society
- Catholic Financial Life
- Danish Brotherhood in America
- Degree of Honor Protective Association
- Gleaner Life Insurance Society (aka Ancient Order of Gleaners)
- Grand United Order of Odd Fellows in America
- Independent Order of Oddfellows
- Knights of Pythias
- Modern Woodmen of America
- National Grange of the Order of Patrons of Husbandry
- Order of United Commercial Travelers of America
- Polish Roman Catholic Union of America
- Royal Neighbors of America
- Sons of Norway
- Spanish Benevolent Society
- Thrivent Financial
- Travelers Protective Association of America
- Vasa Order of America
- WoodmenLife, formerly Woodmen of the World

=== Defunct ===
- American Legion of Honor (1878–1904)
- Ancient Order of United Workmen (1868–1952)
- Artists' Fund Society (1859-1946)
- Brotherhood of American Yeomen (1897–1938)
- Brotherhood of Locomotive Firemen and Enginemen (1873-1969)
- Brotherhood of Railway Carmen (1890-1986)
- Columbian Mutual Life Assurance Society (1903–1963)
- Fraternal Brotherhood (1896–1931)
- Free African Union Society (1780–1824)
- League of Friendship, Mechanical Order of the Sun (1868)

== See also ==
- List of general fraternities
- List of North American ethnic and religious fraternal orders
- List of North American fraternal orders
