= Knights of the Globe =

American fraternal and mutual benefit society (est. 1889)

- KG
- Founded: August 28, 1889; 137 years ago Freeport, Illinois
- Type: Fraternal order
- Affiliation: Independent
- Status: Defunct
- Emphasis: Mutual benefit
- Scope: Regional (Western U.S.)
- Motto: "Obedience, honesty, loyalty"
- Members: 25,000+ lifetime
- Headquarters: Chicago, Illinois; United States

Knights of the Globe (acronym, KG or K of G) was an American social, military, charitable, and patriotic secret organization organized in Freeport, Illinois in 1889. Its originator and founder was a dentist, Dr. William W. Krape, of Freeport, Illinois. The KG secured the death benefit feature to its members through the Knights of the Globe Mutual Benefit Association (KGMBA), a non-secret, cooperative insurance company. The KGMBA was later called the Cosmopolitan Life Insurance Company.

== History ==
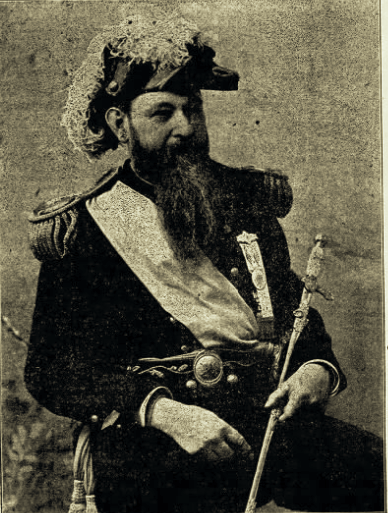
W. W. Krape, founder, originator

The Knights of the Globe was organized in 1889 by Dr. William W. Krape, a dentist in Freeport, Illinois. Krape recruited members that included Freemasons prominent in the Scottish Rite, by Odd Fellows of the highest rank, and by members of the Ancient Order of United Workmen, Royal Arcanum, American Legion of Honor, Woodmen of the World, the Grand Army of the Republic, and other secret societies. The influence of the Workmen was seen in the uniform assessment rate, that of the Freemasons and Odd Fellows in the degree work and emblems, and the Grand Army in its obligation that "no other flag than the glorious Stars and Stripes shall ever float over our country."

The Knights of the Globe established its Supreme Council on August 28, 1889. The fraternal organization was incorporated in Illinois on December 20, 1890. The chief object of the order is mutual helpfulness. Another chief object of the fraternity was to inculcate lofty ideas of American citizenship.

The fraternity celebrated its second anniversary with a parade of 500 members and exercises in the opera house in Freeport on August 28, 1891. Members attended the celebration from Apple River, Byron, Cedarville, Dakota, Davis, Dixon, Elgin, Forreston, Galena, Lanark, Lena, Monroe, Orangeville, Oregon, Pecatonica, Polo, Rochelle, Rock Falls, Rockford, Shannon, Stillman Valley, Warren, Winslow, and Yellow Creek.

Men and women may become members of both the KG and the Knights of the Globe Mutual Benefit Association. Women first joined the Daughters of the Globe, a branch of the Knights of the Globe. While the Order was well distributed throughout the West, it was strong in Illinois, where a large proportion of its 7,000 members resided. By 1907, there were over 25,000 members.

Headquartered in Chicago, it appeared to be extinct by 1923.

== Knights of the Globe Mutual Benefit Association ==
The KG secured the death benefit feature to its members through the Knights of the Globe Mutual Benefit Association (KGMBA), a non-secret, cooperative insurance company, organized under the laws of the State of Illinois in 1890, to which only Knights of the Globe and Daughters of the Globe were eligible.

The mutual aid society through the Knights was recruited from the more healthful portions of the United States. It announced special inducements to young men because of its uniform rate of assessments. It issued death benefit certificates for ten different amounts, ranging from US$500 to US$5,000, to those between 18 and 56 years of age who were otherwise eligible.

It was located in Freeport, Illinois.

Around 1904, the membership of the KGMBA was transferred to the Cosmopolitan Life Insurance Association, an assessment company that started doing business in 1890. Krape, one of the founders of KGMBA, was president of the Cosmopolitan company. This latter company surrendered its charter to the state of Illinois, on September 2, 1909, and attempted to switch the membership to the Old Colony Life association which has brought forth the protest from several hundred Joliet, Illinois policyholders and in fact from policyholders all over the state. When the move was decided to take over the membership of the Cosmopolitan company, delegates were invited to Chicago to meet the officials of the Old Colony company and it was thought that the entire matter could be closed up at a “good feed” which the Old Colony officials placed before the visitors. The Old Colony company was young and rented offices in the Old Colony Building, Chicago, The company proposed to take in the members of the Cosmopolitan company without a physical examination but they would have to pay the premium at their attained age. This meant that the assessments that the policyholders had been paying into the KGMBA, Cosmopolitan Life Insurance company for years, had gone for naught, and if they still desired to carry insurance in the Old Colony, they would have to pay the premium charged to their present age. This is what caused the protest. A committee representing 300 Joliet policyholders of the Cosmopolitan met in November 1909, in Joliet and voted to institute civil proceedings for the recovery of their premiums.

The KGMBA was later called the Cosmopolitan Life Insurance Company. When the rate of insurance for policyholders in fraternal organizations was made the company turned over its interests. A bill in chancery asking that the charter of the Cosmopolitan Life Insurance company, a former Freeport corporation, be set aside, was filed for hearing in the circuit court of the December term by an attorney representing the directors of the company in October 1911. The company practically discontinued business more than one year earlier when the policyholders were reinsured by the Old Colony Life Insurance Company of Chicago. Since that time no business was transacted by the Cosmopolitan company as the entire business was turned over to the other firm.

== Symbols and traditions ==
The fraternity's motto was "Obedience, honesty, loyalty".

Four degrees or ranks were conferred: Volunteer, Militant, Knight, and Valiant Knight. Members wore "Knights Regelia".

== Gallery ==
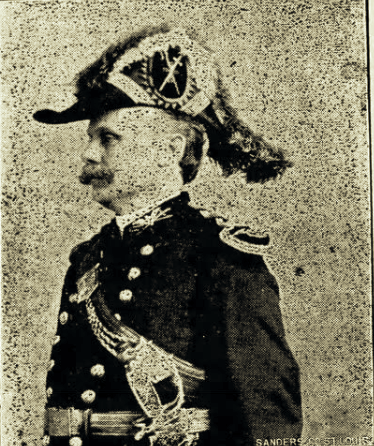
Col. Moses Dillon

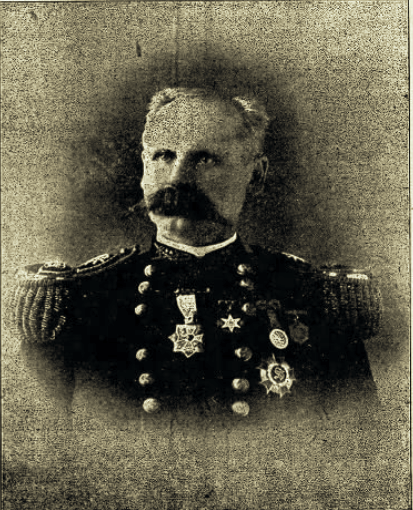
Gen. J. P. Ellacott

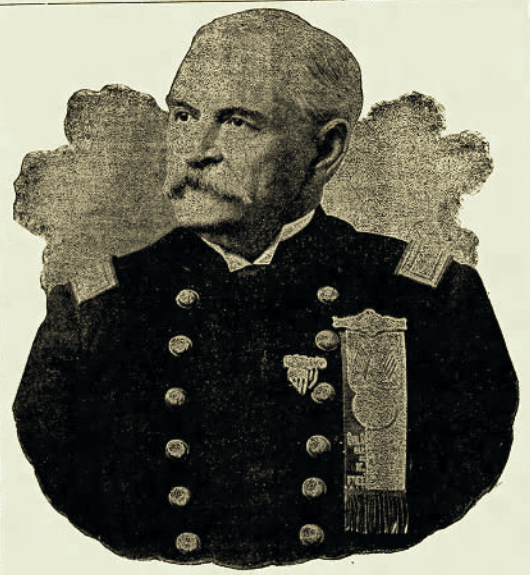
Col. Wm. I. Brady

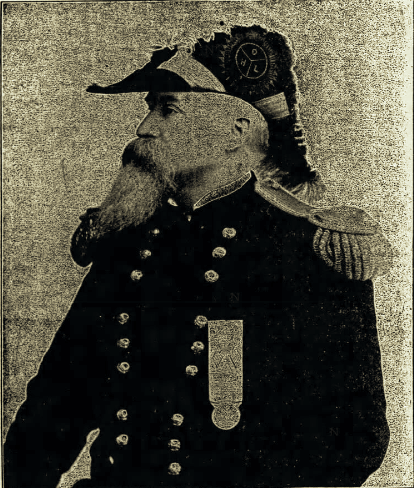
A. C. Schradel, Adjutant General and President, KGMBA

== See also ==
- Benefit society
- List of general fraternities
- List of North American fraternal orders
