= New England Order of Protection =

The New England Order of Protection was fraternal benefit society serving the New England States based in Boston. It was a splinter group of the Knights and Ladies of Honor. The group merged with the Woodmen of the World in 1969.

The Order was founded in 1887 and incorporated in Massachusetts. In 1923 the "Supreme Lodge" was headquartered at 52 Chauncy St., Boston. That year it had 329 lodges with 26,275 benefit and 1,250 social members.

== See also ==
- List of North American fraternal benefit orders
