= Exeter Friendly Society =

British friendly society

The Exeter
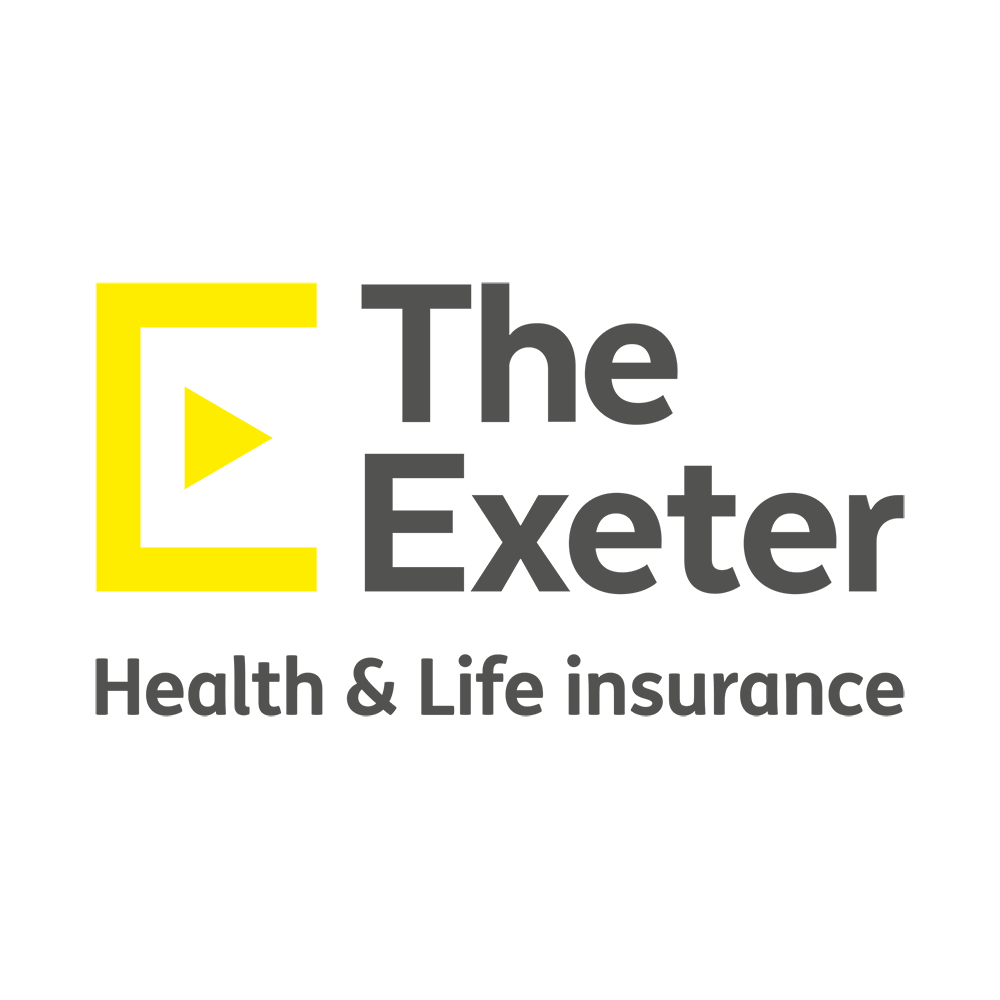
- Logo since 2025
- Formation: 1927; 99 years ago
- Type: Mutual
- Headquarters: Exeter, Devon, England
- Services: Health insurance; Income protection insurance; Life insurance
- Members: 146,385 (2025)
- Owner: Exeter Friendly Society Limited
- Staff: 240 (2025)
- Website: https://www.the-exeter.com/
- Formerly called: Exeter Friendly Society, Exeter Family Friendly Society

Exeter Friendly Society (which since 2015 has traded as The Exeter) is a British friendly society offering a range of insurance products including Income Protection Insurance, Private Medical Insurance and Life Insurance.

They are one of the United Kingdom's largest friendly societies with over 140,000 members and more than 240 employees.

== History ==
The Exeter is a health and life insurance provider established in 1927 with Exeter Friendly Society being registered as a friendly society. From its inception to this day, its head office is based in the city of Exeter, Devon.

In 2008, Exeter Family Friendly Society and Pioneer Friendly Society completed a merger, with Exeter Family Friendly later becoming the trading name of the new merged organisation.

In 2015 a re-brand was completed, with the society now known simply as The Exeter. Since re-branding as The Exeter, the business has seen rapid growth across the UK health and protection industries winning multiple awards for its products and service.

== Offices ==
The Exeter has a single office, their head office based in Exeter Business Park.
