= Knights of the Ancient Order of the Mystic Chain =

The Knights of the Ancient Order of the Mystic Chain were a secret society in the United States in the late nineteenth century. Founded by Freemasons in 1871, the group had a strong Masonic influence in its rituals and degrees, as well as incorporating elements from the Bible and Arthurian legend.

== Organization and membership ==
The Knights were organized on three levels. Local units were called "Subordinate Castles", state or regional groups were "Grand Castles' and the highest authority was the "Supreme Castle".

=== Daughters of Ruth ===
Also known as the Degree of Naomi, this was a female auxiliary established in 1890. Males who were members of a local Castle were also admitted. Originally under the direction of the Supreme Castle, after the degrees rapid growth, it was decided to let the members legislate for themselves. Local bodies were called "Assemblies", which elected a Past Commander to the Grand (State) Assembly, which in turn elected two Past Commanders to the Supreme Castle. These representatives, however, were only allowed to attend meetings of the Supreme Castle when the affairs of the Degree of Naomi were under consideration. In 1899 there were 3,500 members of the Daughters of Ruth, which was present in New York, New Jersey, New Hampshire, Rhode Island, Delaware, Pennsylvania, Ohio, Virginia and West Virginia.

== Benefits ==
The order was founded as a fraternal secret society, without insurance benefits. However, in 1889 it began offering insurance benefits for its members. The Degree of Naomi benefits included weekly benefits of four dollars and a death benefit of fifty dollars.

== Ritual ==
Reflecting the Masonic background of its founders, the Knights of the Ancient Order of the Mystic Chain worked three degrees which every member had to work. The first was the White or Esquire Degree, which was based on the story of the Good Samaritan. The Sir Knight's or Blue Degree was based on Arthurian legend. The third was the Red or Round Table Degree, which emphasized the certainty of death. There was also a uniformed Mark Degree open to past officers of Subordinate Councils and a Supreme Degree conferred by the Supreme Castle. In 1890 a female auxiliary called the Naomi or Daughters of Ruth Degree. Originally this was controlled by the Supreme Castle, but later became autonomous

== See also ==
- List of North American fraternal benefit orders
