= League of Friendship, Mechanical Order of the Sun =

League of Friendship, Mechanical Order of the Sun (also known as League of Friendship of the Supreme Mechanical Order of the Sun; 1868-1868) was a fraternal beneficiary labor organization formed on April 30, 1868, at Meadville, Pennsylvania. From it sprang the Ancient Order of United Workmen (AOUW). The membership of the League was composed almost entirely of mechanics, engineers, firemen, and day laborers employed in the shops and on the lines of the Atlantic and Great Western Railroad, later known as Erie Railroad. Its object was "to advance and foster the interests of its members by cooperating in effort and financial assistance whenever called upon to serve a worthy and approved cause." To this pledge each member was bound by a solemn oath to be obedient and faithful. The League was governed by a "Grand Council", and the dissension which led to the resignation of "Father" John Jordan Upchurch and the other founders of the AOUW, and to the final disbanding of the League, October 27, 1868, was caused by a tax levied by that Council, which many members regarded as an imposition.

== Establishment ==
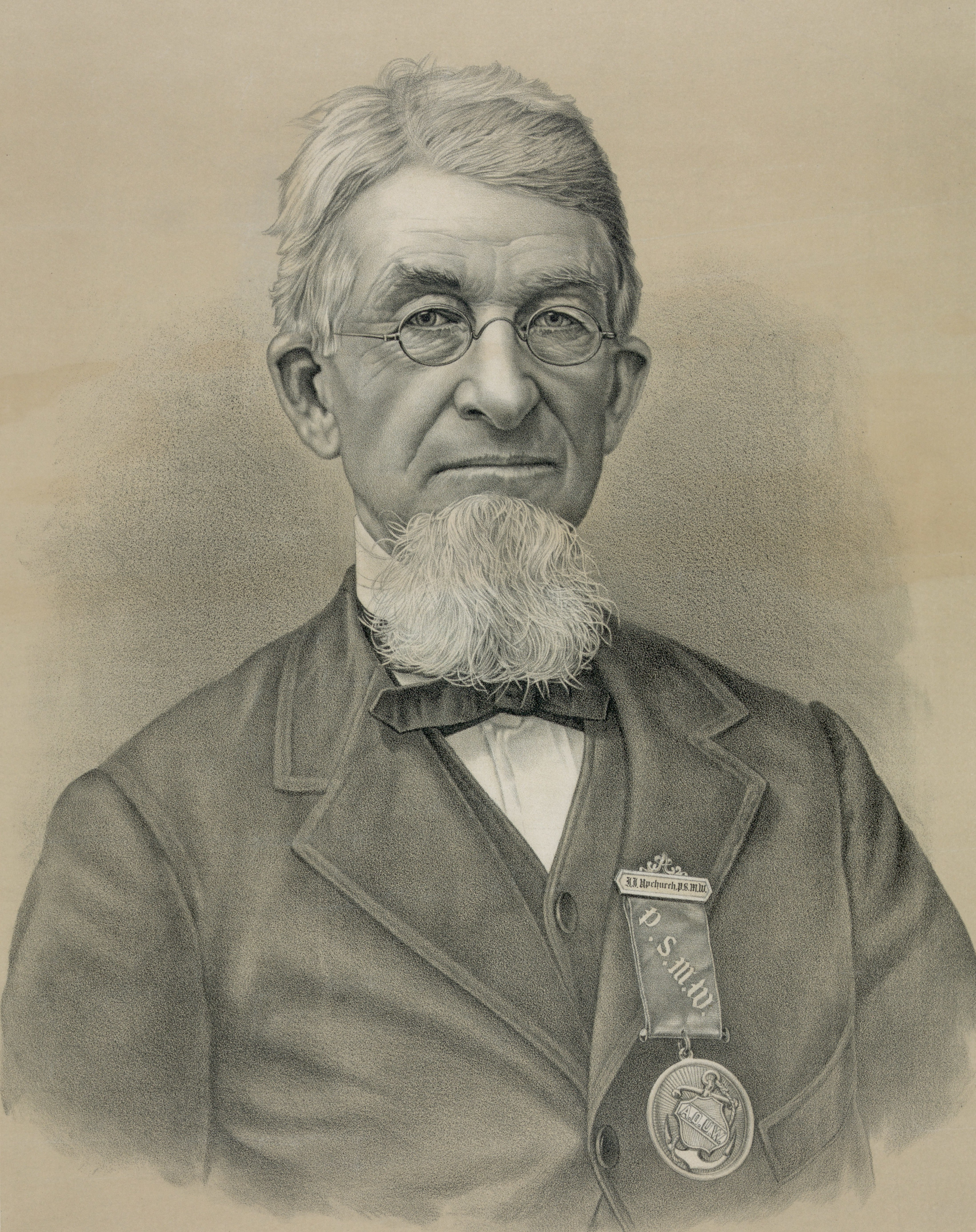
John Jordan Upchurch

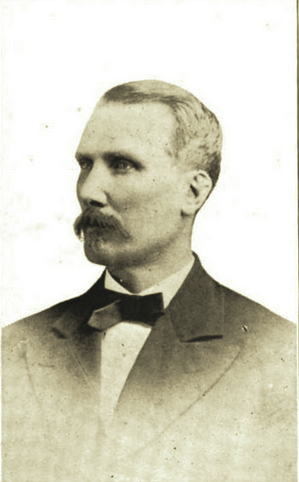
William Washington Walker

In the 1860s, secret associations, with signs and passwords, were established, the largest in point of numbers being the Supreme Mechanical Order of the Sun.

On April 30, 1868, there was organized in the city of Meadville, Pennsylvania, a Subordinate League known as the "League of Friendship of the Mechanical Order of the Sun." There was in existence a Grand Council under whose direction the League in Meadville was organized, as evidenced by the fact that Grand Councilman Holstead is noted as being present and officiating. It is apparent also from the Minutes that membership in the League was restricted to the various kinds of mechanical and day laborers. The membership in the Meadville League was almost entirely composed of mechanics, engineers, firemen and day laborers employed in the shops and on the Atlantic and Great Western Railroad, later known as the Erie Railroad.

From March 1865, to December 1868, William W. Walker lived in Meadville. He was there employed in the shops of the Atlantic and Great Western Railroad. It was here, in the spring of 1868, that he first met John Jordan Upchurch. Both became members of Meadville's League of Friendship of the Mechanical Order of the Sun. Walker joined as a charter member on April 30 and Upchurch became a member at the eighth meeting on June 18, 1868. He was soon after elected as its presiding officer. This Subordinate League, or lodge, had about 100 members, all of them from the shops where Walker and Upchurch worked. About the middle of August 1868, Upchurch was elected presiding officer of this Subordinate League.

The League seemed to have been very prosperous for a time, its membership numbering over one hundred members.

== Organization ==
The object of the League was to advance and foster the interests of its members by cooperating in effort and financial assistance whenever called upon to serve a worthy and approved cause. To this pledge each member was bound by solemn oath to be obedient and faithful. It was an incipient effort striving in the direction of that which later was represented in the labor unions of the U.S.

The Mechanical Order of the Sun was an organization with an extensive ritual, having numerous degrees.

== Dissatisfaction ==
Soon, however, suspicion was aroused as to the integrity of the governing body and especially of the officers that were conducting the affairs of the Grand Council, as it was called. This dissatisfaction culminated when the Meadville League was called upon to pay a tax to the Grand Council which they apparently considered an unwarranted demand.

From a variety of causes, dissatisfaction arose among the members of this Subordinate League. Quietly and adroitly, Upchurch fed this dissatisfaction and sought to fan it into a flame. He had an ax of his own to grind, but because he kept his own counsel, his fellow-members were not aware of that fact. It was easy for Upchurch to pursue this course conscientiously. Rightly or wrongly, he had come to the conclusion that the Mechanical Order of the Sun was a fraudulent concern, the purpose of which was to exploit workingmen. Dissatisfaction increased quite rapidly. Many of the members lapsed in disgust. A few became interested in the idea of dissolving the Subordinate League and of founding a new organization. That seed was planted by Upchurch.

== Dissolution ==
The action of the League of Friendship lodge, in dissolving its organization, started with the appointing of a committee to prepare a constitution and ritual for a new organization embodying the ideas advanced by Upchurch. The committee of seven members of the Lodge, consisted of J. J. Upchurch as chairman, W. W. Walker, J. R. Umberger, M. H. McNair, Henry Deross, A. Klock, and J. R. Hulse.

The committee met October 10, 1868, at the house of Upchurch. He submitted plans of which he had dreamed and upon which he had labored for a good many years. The other members of the committee knew nothing about his dreams and labors, but his plans struck them favorably and they willingly left to him the preparation of the constitution and ritual, both of which were accepted and approved by the committee.

On October 27, 1868, at the regular meeting of the League of Friendship, the committee reported. A motion was made and carried to dissolve the League of Friendship and proceed to the organization of a new Order. Upchurch presented the constitution and ritual approved by the committee, which was adopted, the League was declared dissolved. Then 14 ex-members proceeded to organize the first Subordinate Lodge of the AOUW.

== Upchurch's motives ==
Extract of letter of J. J. Upchurch to J. M. McNair, Meadville, Pennsylvania, February 3, 1873:—

"Below I give you a few points that probably you are unacquainted with that may be of use to you in writing up the history of the Order. The circumstances which first led me to study the wants of the working people and the best way of arriving at them were as follows: In the year of 1864 I held the office of Master Mechanic of the Mine Hill and Schuylkill Haven R. R. In the month of June of that year the crews of engineers on the road demanded an advance of fifty cents per day of wages. Engineers at that time were receiving three dollars and sixty cents per day. Their demands were made known to the company, when I was authorized to give them an advance of forty cents a day which would (give) engineers four dollars per day, conductors and brakemen in the same proportion. When I made the proposition, it was received with derision; at the same time I was told that their union had directed them to demand an advance of fifty cents and they would not go to work without it. It struck me very forcibly, the injustice in any order or society to assume to direct in a matter wherein they could not possibly know anything of the circumstances under which the difficulties had arisen and do arise between employer and employee, as was very evident in the present difficulty. My mind seemed to be drawn towards the introduction of a plan whereby the necessity of all strikes might be obviated and all differences be settled by the more satisfactory method of compromise. In my mind the best means to accomplish this object was to bring together employer and employee face to face, by uniting them in the bonds of fraternal friendship. Having matured a rough plan in my mind to accomplish said object, I imparted my rough ideas in 1865 to Bro. Francis I. Keffer, of Petroleum Center. He encouraged me, concurring in my views of the matter. Not having an opportunity of introducing my ideas, the whole matter was allowed to rest until June 2; 1868. At this time being a citizen of Meadville, Pa., I was proposed and elected as a suitable person to become a member of an Order or Society known as "League of Friendship, Supreme Mechanical Order of the Sun." I was not long in finding out that we were groping our way in the dark. We could get no information whatever from the officers of the Grand Council, as it was called, neither were we allowed a representative to that body unless we went further and joined what was called the "Knights of the Iron Ring." All we had to do was to pay more money or be quiet, live in ignorance and pay taxes. This information came to hand after stenuous efforts had been made to extract it. (This) was sufficient to convince me that the whole thing was a scheme, was rotten to the core, gotten up for the purpose of fraud. From this time I was determined, if possible, to break up the humbug and introduce my ideas of right and justice between man and man, and went to work for the purpose."

== See also ==
- Benefit society
- List of general fraternities
- List of North American fraternal orders
