= Royal Arcanum =

Fraternal benefit society

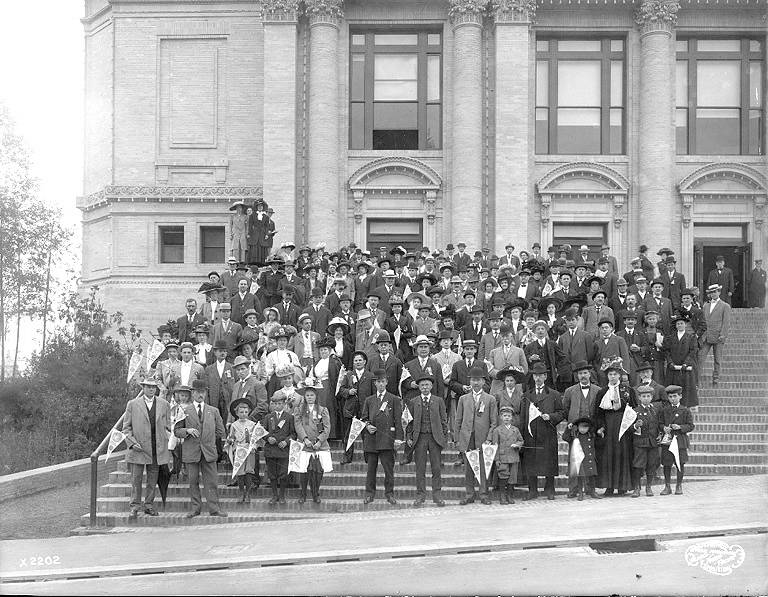
Members of the Royal Arcanum posed on the auditorium steps at the Alaska-Yukon-Pacific Exposition in Seattle, Washington, June 23, 1909.

The Supreme Council of the Royal Arcanum, commonly known simply as the Royal Arcanum, is a fraternal benefit society founded in 1877 in Boston, Massachusetts by John A. Cummings and Darius Wilson, who had previously been among the founders of the Knights of Honor, a similar organization, in Kentucky. The Royal Arcanum home office is located in Boston, Massachusetts.

The Supreme Council of the Royal Arcanum has EIN 04–1885430 as a 501(c)(8) Fraternal Beneficiary Societies; in 2024 it claimed total revenue of $8,950,527 and total assets of $90,523,499.

== History ==
The Royal Arcanum was found by Dr. Darius Wilson, who had also played a prominent role in the foundation of the Knights of Honor, American Legion of Honor and the Royal Society of Good Fellows, as well as being a prominent official in the Order of United American Mechanics, Ancient Order of United Workmen, a Freemason and an Oddfellow. For three years he had tried to convince the knights to adopt a graded assessment plan, but to no avail. Therefore, he decided to create his own society that would work on the plan. To make sure he would have control over the direction of the group, he wrote its ritual, constitution, beneficial plan, passwords and even designed the organization's emblem himself. On June 23, 1877, he called together a group of his friends at 1066 Washington Street, Boston and initiated them as the first Supreme Council of the new order. Among the other participants was J. A. Cummings, at that time Grand Vice Dictator of the Knight of Honor in Massachusetts, who was offered, but refused, the post of Supreme Regent of the Royal Arcanum. The Arcanum Hall in Dedham, Massachusetts shared a building with the East Dedham branch of the Dedham Public Library.

== Organization ==
The structure of the Royal Arcanum follows a three tiered system. Local groups are called "Subordinate Councils" or "Councils" which consist of at least 16 members who meet the qualifications of its elective officers. Five Councils in a given state, territory, Canadian province or any two of the same, with at least 1,000 members may petition the Supreme Council for institution as a "Grand Council". The highest authority is the biennial Supreme Council. This basic organizational structure has not changed substantially since the nineteenth century, nor has the group's headquarters moved from Boston.

== Membership ==
The RA's membership requirements have varied over time. In the early stages of its existence it was confined to "acceptable" men between eighteen and fifty five years old. It also required its members to believe in a Supreme Being and state that "Mongolians, whether of pure or of mixed blood, no matter what they believe, are ineligible." These restrictions have been removed.

For a while the RA had a female auxiliary called the Loyal Ladies of the Royal Arcanum, founded in 1909. This group was recognized by the main order in 1923. There was also a group called the Loyal Additional Benefit Association, which operated as a kind of side degree open only to members of the RA. It was founded in 1889 and incorporated in New Jersey the next year. By the mid-1890s it had a membership of 6,000 and offered $1,000 and $2,000 certificates, as well as funds for sick and distressed members.

The order was successful in acquiring new members in the early decades of its existence. Its annual report of April 23, 1878 noted that the organization had 2,781 member in 82 Councils spread out across Massachusetts, Maine, Rhode Island, New York, New Jersey, Pennsylvania, Ohio, Michigan, Virginia, Georgia and Ontario, Canada; there were also petitions for the formation of Councils in Kansas, Illinois, California, and New Hampshire. By 1896 it had in excess of 200,000 members. In 1919 the order had over 135,000 members. This declined to 36,000 in 1965, 28,000 in 1979, 28,111 members in 1994.

== Benefits ==
As stated, the order worked on the graded assessment system at its inception. The Supreme Council administered death benefits, called the Widows and Orphans Benefit Fund, paying out over $40 million by the mid-1890s in $1,500 and $3,000 certificates. Sick and disability benefits were administered by the Subordinate Councils. However, with increasing assessments in 1896, the order switched from the graded assessment modal to an actuarial modal at its Supreme Council in Cleveland in 1898 and went into effect August 1 of that year. The new system based the benefits on 21 separate assessments collected in twelve different payments yearly. Eighteen of these covered mortality costs, one the "war danger," and two for an emergency fund.

By the 1970s this system had been modernized, somewhat, and the benefit categories were listed as "Death, Disability, Old Age Benefits, Educational Loans, Retirement Income Annuities and Weekly Hospital Indemnity Benefits." In the 1970s the Society awarded scholarships to high school students who had been members of the RA for three years. Scholarships are awarded to RA orphans, and student loans were also given available.

== Ritual ==
Even as late as the 1970s, the order put a good deal of emphasis on its ritual. It was described at that time as being quite elaborate, and made use of the number 1105, which had a sort of esoteric meaning to the members of the order. It required members to take lengthy oath or obligation at the time of initiation. The order's motto is "Mercy, Virtue, Charity".

== Legal history ==
Royal Arcanum was a party in three rulings by the Supreme Court of the United States, in each having to do with benefits offered by the council:

- Wishart v. Supreme Council of Royal Arcanum – 226 U. S. 611 (1912)
- Supreme Council of the Royal Arcanum v. Green – 237 U.S. 531 (1915)
- Supreme Council of Royal Arcanum v. Behrend – 247 U.S. 394 (1918)
