= Umberto Primo Society =

Canadian mutual aid society

The Umberto Primo Society was a mutual aid society founded in Toronto, Canada, in 1888 by Italian immigrants, most of whom were natives of Laurenzana and Genoa. The organization was named after Umberto I, who was King of Italy at the time of its foundation. By 1914, the organization had around 230 members.

Its first president was Donato Glionna, who was also a leader within the Liberal Party of Canada.
