= Tribe of Ben-Hur =

American fraternal organization (1894–1990s)

- Formation: January 9, 1894
- Founded at: Crawfordsville, Indiana
- Type: fraternal organization
- Locations: Illinois; Ohio; Michigan; Iowa; Missouri; Kansas; Nebraska; Colorado; Pennsylvania; New York; New Jersey; California; Oregon; Washington
- Key people: Ira Joy Chase (First Supreme Chief); D. W. Gerard; F. L. Snyder

The Tribe of Ben-Hur was a fraternal organization based on the novel Ben-Hur: A Tale of the Christ by Lew Wallace. In 1930 it became the Ben-Hur Life Association.

== History ==
The idea of starting a fraternal organization based on Ben-Hur had first been broached by D. W. Gerard and F. L. Snyder, both of Crawfordsville, Indiana. In November 1893 they held a conference with Lew Wallace asking for his consent to form the order. Wallace consented and secured the permission from his publishers, but objected to the proposed name, "Knights of Ben-Hur", saying "there were only tribes in those days", and suggested "Tribe of Ben-Hur" instead. The Order was incorporated in the state of Indiana on January 9, 1894, and held the first meeting of its "Supreme Tribe" on January 16. Ex-governor Ira Joy Chase was elected the first Supreme Chief.

The popularity of Ben-Hur helped spread the order, and it gained members quickly in its early years. By January 1, 1895, it had 1,701 members. By the same date in 1896 it had 5,050 and on January 1, 1897, it counted 12,322, 12,000 of whom had joined in December 1896 alone. In 1910 the order counted 106,216 members. However, in 1979 it was down to 31,000 and counted only 15,000 in 1990.

The Tribe spread quickly in its early years, and by 1897 it had a presence in Indiana, Illinois, Ohio, Michigan, Iowa, Missouri, Kansas, Nebraska, Colorado, Pennsylvania, New York, New Jersey, California, Oregon and Washington state. In the 1920s it operated in thirty states. In 1979 it was licensed to sell insurance in only sixteen states and the District of Columbia.

The Ben-Hur Life Association became a commercial company, USA Life Insurance, in 1988.

== Organization ==
Local units were called "Courts". The first Court was chartered on March 1, 1894, as "Simonides Court #1" at Crawfordsville, Indiana. By 1910 there were 1,309 Courts. In 1979 it was down to 217. Its headquarters remained in Crawfordsville through the 1970s.

== Rituals ==
The organization's rituals were based on the novel Ben-Hur and were said to be "moral, religious and patriotic". There were degrees, ceremonies and an oath of secrecy, though the Order was not rigid in requiring the latter. A "New Temple Degree", to be awarded only by the Supreme Tribe, was created in 1920.

== Benefits ==
The Tribe worked on a graded assessment program, whereby people who join the Order while between the ages of eighteen and twenty three were insured for a maximum of $3,000 and people who joined the Order between the ages of fifty four and sixty five had a maximum of $500. There were decreasing age grades between these two. All of this was paid out on a $1 monthly dues for a whole certificate. Members could also opt for a 50 cents-per-month half certificate, with corresponding declines in benefits or 1.5 or double certificates with similar increases, but it would never pay more the $3,000 for any given life, nor more than a whole certificate on the life of a woman. Despite this men and women were supposedly admitted to membership upon terms of "absolute equality".

In addition to these features, the Order kept a reserve fund, did not make assessments at death, had both southern and northern beneficiary divisions and required prospective members to take a medical exam. After the first thirty-five months of existence it paid out $51,250 on 31 deaths and had surplus and reserve funds of $35,664.

The Tribe had a scholarship fund. By 1920, the fund paid out scholarships of $500 per year of college education. This practice continued into the 1970s, though the "nature of the awards has changed". The society also operated a monthly allowance program for eligible orphans from birth to eighteen.
