= Protestant Alliance Friendly Society =

Australian friendly society

The Protestant Alliance Friendly Society was a friendly society that operated in many states of Australia, with branches in many towns and districts. The motto of the society was "Fear God, Love the Brotherhood, Honour the King".

Like most friendly societies, one of the benefits of membership was to receive payments to assist during illness and, in the event of a member's death, payments toward funeral expenses and pensions to support the member's widow and children. Although membership was initially only open to adult men, women and juveniles were later permitted to join the society.

In the 1990s, following the transfer of the Protestant Alliance Health Benefit Fund to the Australian Unity Friendly Society, the organisation began to call itself the Protestant Alliance Fraternal Society.
