= Fraternal Brotherhood =

American fraternal and benefit society

- Founded: 1896; 130 years ago Los Angeles, California, US
- Type: Benefit society
- Affiliation: Independent
- Status: Merged
- Scope: National
- Chapters: 280
- Members: 23,720+ lifetime
- Headquarters: Figueroa Street; Los Angeles, California; United States

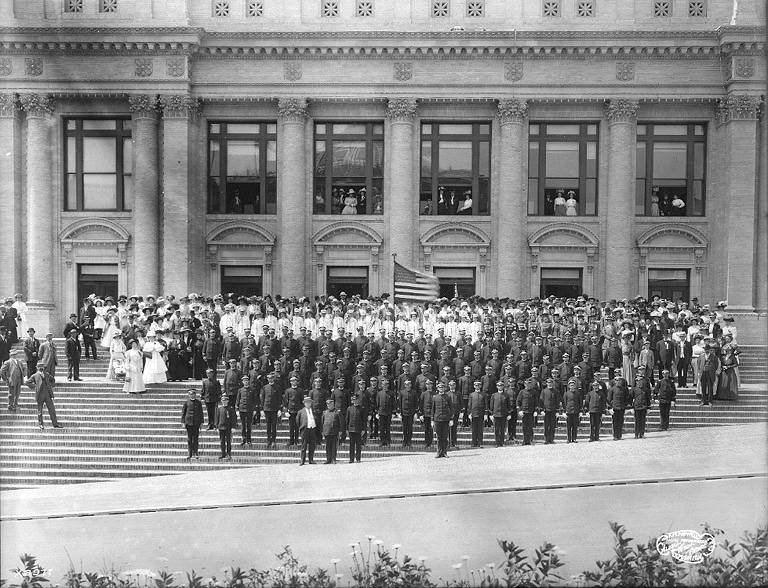
Fraternal Brotherhood members pose on the steps of the auditorium of the Alaska-Yukon-Pacific Exposition, Seattle, 1909.

The Fraternal Brotherhood was one of the many fraternal and mutual aid organizations that arose in the United States during the golden age of fraternalism. Unlike most such societies in that era, it accepted men and women as members on an equal footing. In March 1914, Emma R. Neidig was elected as its Supreme President, the first woman to head such a mixed-gender fraternal organization. Neidig had been Supreme Vice President of the organization since 1898, two years after its founding in 1896 in Los Angeles, California.

The group was largely a mutual insurance society, described by the Los Angeles Herald in 1908 as "one of the most popular and trustworthy orders in the country" with "about 40,000 members" and with offices on Figueroa Street at the corner of Lincoln in Los Angeles. Still, during its years as the Fraternal Brotherhood, it had many of the trappings of a lodge or secret society. There were 23,720 benefit members and 711 social members in 280 lodges in 1923. Each lodge had a chaplain. There was also a juvenile department for children of members. The Brotherhood had a secret ritual, passwords, grips and signs.

Although they were active in fourteen U.S. states in 1908 and eighteen in 1923, the bulk of their business was in California. According to the California Insurance Commissioner, in 1924 the organization had assets of $1,304,372.10 and paid $459,411.90 in benefits, the bulk of that being death claims ($204,938.05) and old age benefits ($189,315.40), but also including $27,194.46 in permanent disability claims and $33,595.90 in sick and accident claims (the remaining $4,368.09 being certificate and reissue fees).

The organization merged with the Iowa-based Homesteaders Life Association in 1931, becoming the Golden West Life Insurance Association. In 1948 it was renamed as the Homesteader’s Life Company. Homesteaders Life Association had similar origins as a fraternal and mutual insurance organization, the Homesteaders, also admitting men and women on an equal footing. Founded in 1906 by two officers who were forced to resign from the Brotherhood of American Yeomen, in 1923, it had transformed from a fraternal organization to just a mutual insurance group.
