= Artisans Order of Mutual Protection =

American fraternal benefit society

The Artisans Order of Mutual Protection is a fraternal benefit society operating in the United States.

== History ==
The Artisans Order of Mutual Protection was founded by Civil War medical examiner Dr. James Bunn, his supervisor Dr. Matson, and a and Mr. McMurray. Dr. Bunn had also help found the Ancient Order of United Workmen. Preliminary meetings on the idea of a fraternal benefit society that would benefit the working man were first held by this group in 1867. They met again in 1872 in St. Louis, Missouri. At this meeting Dr. Bunn unveiled the rituals of the order and administered an oath to those in attendance to keep it secret. Another convention was held in Washington, DC in 1873 and Dr. Bunn was given the title of the "Most Excellent Master Artisan". Bunn was authorized to institute assemblies and start to recruit new members into the order. The charter was signed on May 1, 1873.

In its early years, the order had had a lengthy ritual that was heavily influenced by Freemasonry. This ritual had been set up by Mr. McMurray. It worked three degrees: Endentured Apprentice, Fellow Workman, and Perfect Artisan. The rituals, lengths, and derivativeness led to controversy within the organization and it was shortened. The shortened version was kept essentially unchanged into the 1970s. The Artisans are the oldest fraternal benefit society of its kind in the United States. Bryan C. Werner, Director A.O.M.P.

== Organization ==
The order has a two-level structure. Local units where the members meet on a monthly basis are called "Assemblies". The national body that meets every two years at a semi-annual convention is called the "Most Excellent Assembly". The Most Excellent Assembly meets on a semi-annual basis and it is the body that governs the entire organization. This semi-annual convention is a gathering of elected delegates from the local Assemblies and permanent delegates. Officers and Directors are elected at this meeting as well as the business of the main office and local assemblies being discussed. The Most Excellent Master Artisan is elected at this convention to a two-year term. The Master Artisan is the President of the organization and his/her duties are to make sure that the fraternal end of the organization is running well and all the rules are being followed by the Assemblies. The national office is located in Philadelphia, Pennsylvania. This office is run by the General Manager, who handles the day-to-day operations of the business. Term and whole-life insurance policies as well as annuities are available for purchase at the Artisans main office. A junior department was founded in 1933 for young males aged thirty days to eighteen years old. Junior membership is now open to all male and female children. This department is almost entirely insurance oriented. A women's department with its own assemblies was established in 1955. Some assemblies are still just for male or female members but many are now co-ed.

== Membership ==
The Order had 30,000 members by 1930. In the 1950s the combined junior and adult organizations reached a high of 36,000. This dropped off to 32,000 in 1967 and 26,000 in 1978. As of 2017 the organization had approximately 6,000 members.

== Ritual ==
Every adult member who joins the order is required to go through an initiation ceremony, including swearing an oath of obligation. There are still Masonic influences, such as the use of a white apron.

== See also ==
- Travelers Protective Association of America
- List of North American fraternal benefit orders
