= Knights and Ladies of Honor =

Fraternal beneficiary organization in the US

The Knights and Ladies of Honor was a highly successful and popular American fraternal benefit organization in the late 19th and early twentieth century. It is perhaps the first major fraternal benefit organization to adopt the idea of diversity allowing non-white persons and racial groups to be recognized and establish lodges.

== Background ==
The Knights and Ladies of Honor originated as a splinter group of the Knights of Honor, a fraternal secret society founded in 1873. In 1875, the Knights of Honor created an auxiliary, the Degree of Protection, open to wives, mothers, widows and unmarried daughters and sisters of members of the Knights of Honor, as well as male members of the parent order. Only a few lodges of the auxiliary were formed in the years between its creation and May 1877, when the Supreme Lodge of the Knights of Honor abolished the auxiliary. On September 6, 1877, representatives of the lodges of the Degree met in convention in Louisville, Kentucky, and decided to form their own organization. This convention elected a "Provisional Supreme Lodge", which included, among others, J. A. Demaree, one of the original founders of the Knights of Honor. The first official meeting of the "Supreme Lodge of Protection, Knights of and Ladies of Honor" was held on September 19, 1878, in St. Louis and the order was incorporated by the Commonwealth of Kentucky on the following April. On December 14, 1881, the General Assembly of Kentucky amended its charter slightly, changing its name from the Order of Protection of the Knights and Ladies of Honor to the Order of the Knights and Ladies of Honor. They operated independently and parallel to the Knight of Honor which co-existed.

== Organization ==
The original Knights and Ladies of Honor was organized on a three tier lodge system with local Subordinate Lodges, state level Grand Lodges and governed by a national Supreme Lodge. There were 16 Grand Lodges in 1896. Its headquarters was in Indianapolis, Indiana.

== Historic benefits ==
On June 30, 1878, it had 907 male members and 1,018 females, for a total of 1,925. On December 1, 1895, it had 39,922 men and 43,083 women totaling 83,005. Of the 8,000 death benefits the society paid out during that time, 4,198 were male and 3,802 were female. In 1898 it had declined to 72,000. In 1908 it claimed 100,000 members.

When they started in 1878, membership in the Knights and Ladies of Honor was open to acceptable white men and women between the ages of eighteen and fifty who were in a reputable profession, business or occupation. After much dispute in the late nineteenth century the Knights and Ladies of Honor was the first and largest fraternal organizations to accept other races and let them set up their own fraternal lodges. One of its goals was "to give all moral and material aid in its power" to its members and their dependents by holding "moral, literary and scientific" lectures as well as assisting each other to obtain employment and encouraging each other in business. There was an optional relief fund which was divided into four "divisions" for $500, $1000, $2000 and $3,000. Upon the death of a member designees were given the sum of money the deceased contributed in life, as well as the amount specified on his certificate.

As the group's membership aged and more members died the monthly assessment went up. In 1916 older members of the group appealed to the New York State Department of Insurance to protect their interests, claiming that the assessments were exorbitant and was half a million dollars behind on its death benefits. In one case an 84-year-old man was paying an $18.40 assessment, 922% more than he had originally paid when he joined the order forty years prior.

== See also ==
- List of North American fraternal benefit orders
- Degree of Honor Protective Association
