= History of Slovenes in Cleveland =

The history of Slovenes in Cleveland began in the 19th century, peaking between the late 19th and early 20th century with massive emigration of Slovenes prior to World War I. Slovenes in the Cleveland metropolitan area make up the largest Slovene diaspora in the United States. Since Slovene immigrants began to settle in Cleveland in the 1880s, Cleveland has become home to the largest population of Slovenes in the world outside of Slovenia. Until Slovene independence in 1990, the Slovene consulate in Cleveland served as an official consulate for Yugoslavia under Tito.

== History ==
The first documented Slovene in the Cleveland area was John Pintar, who first arrived in Cleveland in 1879 and returned to the Kingdom of Croatia-Slavonia five months later; the first permanent Slovene resident of Cleveland was Jožef Turk in 1881. Slovenes began to settle in large numbers around the Cleveland area in the 1880s, particularly in the area that would become known as Newburgh. Other sizeable communities grew in the Collinwood and Euclid neighborhoods. By the 1890s, a larger community formed along St. Clair Avenue, eventually building up along eastern Cleveland and Lake Erie. As Cleveland grew as a major center of steel and iron production, immigration swelled in search of jobs. By 1914, one-third of Cleveland was foreign-born with an estimated 20,000 Slovenes. This made Cleveland the third-largest Slovene city in the world, behind Trieste and Ljubljana. Rates of immigration slowed between 1924 and 1940 due to the Immigration Act of 1924, with most Slovenes immigrating as reunited family members. Slovenes who came after World War II were predominantly political refugees.

The 1970 census listed 46,000 foreign-born or mixed-parentage Slovenes in the Cleveland area. The Slovene community continued to push east into Lake County through the 1980s, with a peak population over 50,000 Slovene-Americans in the greater Cleveland area by 1990.

== Culture ==
The first Slovenian cultural organization was the short-lived Marijin Spolek (the Marian Society), a mutual aid society formed following the death of a young Slovene man, Peter Podrzaj, in order to protect the economic wellbeing of the growing Slovene community in 1890. The Slovene community at the time was predominantly young men who did not intend to stay in America, but rather to send money to their families in Slovenia. Turk, now an established presence in Cleveland with a number of businesses, paid for Podrzaj's funeral, and convinced 7 other men to form the Marijin Spolek as an insurance group again sickness, death, and burial costs. The Slovak priest Stephen Furdek encouraged the Marijin Spolek members to fund a Slovene church, which laid the groundwork for St. Vitus's Church. The church was named after its founding priest, Vitus Hribar, who moved from Kamnik, Slovenia at the request of Turk to provide church service in Slovenian to the growing population. A number of other churches, including St. Lawrence (1901), St. Mary (1906), and St. Christine (1925) soon followed. Due to internal dissent, some members of Marijin Spolek splintered off to form the Slovenian Benefit Society Slovenija (Slovensko Podporno Drustvo Slovenija), while the remaining members became a part of the large American Slovenian Catholic Union (Kranjsko Slovenska Katoliška Jednota).

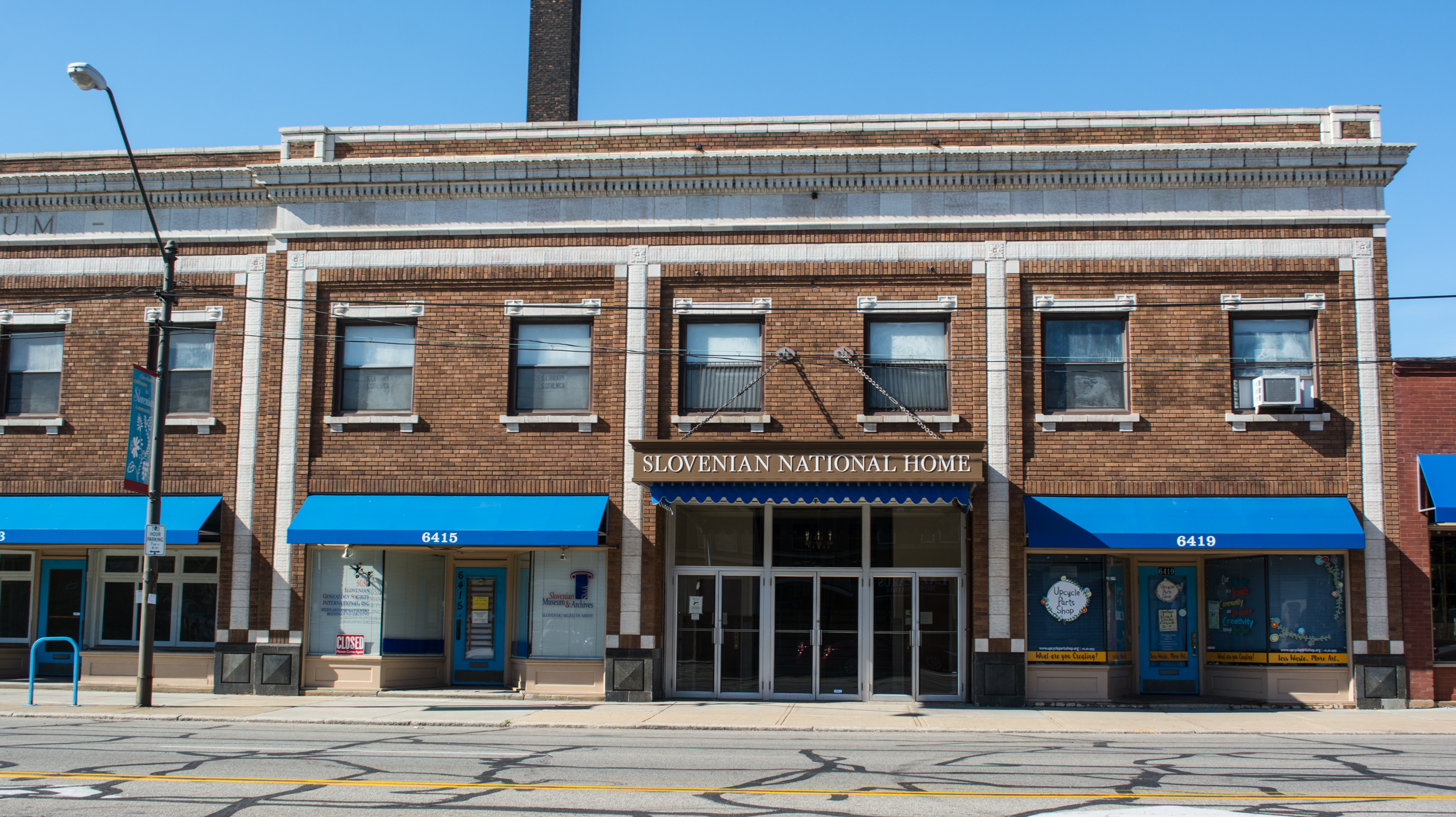
The Slovenian National Home in Cleveland, Ohio at 6409 St. Clair Avenue. The building was named as a Greater Cleveland Landmark in 1984.

The Slovenian Sokol was formed in 1897 to promote gymnastics, as well as music and literature in the Slovene community. A number of Slovene-language newspapers were started in Cleveland, including Narodna Beseda (National Word), Nova Domovina (New Homeland), Ameriska Domovina (American Home) which continued publication into the 1990s, and Enakopravnost (Equality). The Catholic, more conservative Ameriska Domovina was frequently at odds with the more liberal Enakopravnost which was emblematic of the growing divide between the more and less religious sides of the Slovene community. This rift resulted in a number of identical organizations divided by ideology, such as the large number of Slovene singing communities including the Zarja Singing Society founded by Cleveland members of the Jugoslav Socialist Federation compared to the Lira Singing Society established at St. Vitus. Immigration from Slovenia slowed considerably during World War I, but Slovenes from other parts of the United States migrated to Cleveland and the community was bolstered by a high birth rate. Community leaders began serious discussions about building a center of Slovenian cultural and social life, finally culminating in the Slovenian National Home, built in 1924, after the planning organization was formed 10 years prior.

Although Slovenian language use has almost entirely disappeared, Slovenian culture and cultural events maintains a significant role in the community with events such as the Cleveland Kurentovanje, which is a program of the Slovenian Museum and Archives. The final issue of Ameriska Domovina was published on August 21, 2008.

== Organizations ==
- American Mutual Life Association
- Progressive Slovene Women of America
- Zarja Singing Society

== Notable persons ==
- Frank Lausche
- Michael Polensek
- George Voinovich
- Frankie Yankovic
- Ivan Zorman
