= List of U.S. organizations of migrants from Austria-Hungary =

This is a working list to collect migrant organizations of migrants from Austria-Hungary to the United States of America. These migrants belonged both to the first and second wave of 19th century US migration and were from diverse ethnic backgrounds.

Although ethnicity was not the sole category by which Austro-Hungarian migrants associated, it is a practical guideline to order them because mostly language was and is an important criterion. In many cases though, ethnic definitions (like in the South Slav case) were not clear. Some organizations merged and split on ethnic grounds, others co-operated across ethnic definitions. Therefore, some organizations are listed under several categories.

Usually, Austro-Hungarian migrant organizations in the US were mutual benefit societies and working class oriented, and many turned eventually into life insurance companies. Some were rather political, others initiated by interested parties in the so-called homeland (Austria-Hungary or one of its regions).

== Austrian ==
Burgenlaendische Gemeinschaft

Sons of Hermann. Founded in 1840.

German Order of Harugari. Founded in 1847.

Austrian American Benevolent Association. Founded in 1870.

== Bosnian ==
American Jugoslav Association of Minnesota Founded 1924.

== Croat ==
American Jugoslav Association of Minnesota Founded 1924.

Croatian Fraternal Union (Hrvatska Bratska Zajednica) Founded 1894, re-founded as CFU in 1925.

== Czech ==
- Bohemian Citizens' Benevolent Society Founded 1892
- Czech-Slovak Protective Society
- Zapadni Ceska Bratrska Jednota Founded 1897.

== Czechoslovak ==
Bohemian Citizens' Benevolent Society Founded 1892

Czech-Slovak Protective Society

ZCBJ Founded 1897.

== German ==
Sons of Hermann. Founded in 1840.

German Order of Harugari. Founded in 1847.

Philadelphia United German-Hungarians. Founded in 1910.

== Hungarian ==
Hungarian Reformed Federation of America. Founded in 1896.

Philadelphia United German-Hungarians. Founded in 1910.

== Italian ==
Order Sons of Italy in America. Founded in 1905.

== Polish ==
Polish National Alliance. Founded in 1880.

Polish Roman Catholic Union of America. Founded in 1873.

== Rusyn ==
Greek Catholic Union of the USA. Founded in 1892.

== Slovak ==
- Bohemian Citizens' Benevolent Society Founded 1892
- Czech-Slovak Protective Society
- Zapadni Ceska Bratrska Jednota Founded 1897.

== Serb ==
American Jugoslav Association of Minnesota Founded 1924.

== Slovene ==
American Jugoslav Association of Minnesota Founded 1924.

Grand Carniolan Slovene Catholic Union (Kranjsko slovenska katoliška jednota, today Slovenian Catholic Union) Founded 1894.

South Slavic Catholic Union (Jugoslovenska katoliška jednota, American Fraternal Union (AFU) since 1941). Founded 1898.

Slovenian Mutual Benefit Association (Slovenska dobrodelna zveza, American Mutual Life Association (AMLA) since 1966). Founded 1910.

Progressive Slovene Women of America (PSWA, Napredne Slovenke Amerike). Founded in 1934.

Slovenian Women's Union of America (SWUA, Slovenska ženska zveza Amerike). Founded in 1926

Slovene National Benefit Society (SNPJ, Slovenska narodna podporna jednota). Founded in 1904.

Western Slavonic Association (WSA, Zahodna slovanska veza). Founded in 1908.

== South Slav ==
American Jugoslav Association of Minnesota Founded 1924.

Croatian Fraternal Union (Hrvatska Bratska Zajednica) Founded 1894, re-founded as CFU in 1925.

== Ukrainian ==
Ukrainian National Association. Founded in 1894.

== Yugoslav ==
American Jugoslav Association of Minnesota Founded 1924.

Croatian Fraternal Union (Hrvatska Bratska Zajednica) Founded 1894, re-founded as CFU in 1925.

Yugoslav Socialist Association (Jugoslovanska Socialistična Zveza). Founded in Chicago, IL 1905, existed until 1952.
