= American Mutual Life Association =

Slovenian-American fraternal organization

- AMLA
- Founded: November 11, 1910; 115 years ago Cleveland, Ohio, US
- Type: Benefit society
- Affiliation: American Fraternal Alliance
- Former affiliation: Ohio Fraternal Congress
- Status: Active
- Emphasis: Slovenian-Americans
- Scope: Regional
- Publication: Our Voice (Glas Adz)
- Former name: Slovenska Dobrodelna Zveza (Slovenian Mutual Benefit Association)
- Headquarters: 19424 South Waterloo Road; Cleveland, Ohio 44119; United States
- Website: americanmutual.org

The American Mutual Life Association (AMLA) is an ethnic fraternal benefit and social organization for Slovene immigrants and their descendants in the United States. Headquartered in Cleveland, Ohio, it serves members primarily in Ohio. It is a member of the American Fraternal Alliance.

== History ==
The Slovenska Dobrodelna Zveza (Slovenian Mutual Benefit Association) was formed in Grdina's Hall on St. Clair Avenue in Cleveland, Ohio, on November 11, 1910. It was created through the merged of several smaller Slovenian-American fraternal organizations, including the St. Barbara Society of Forest City, Pennsylvania. John Gornik was its first president.

Originally, membership in SDZ was open to individuals of Slovenian descent, age 16 to 45, who lived in Ohio, were in good health, and had a good character. The fraternity held its first convention in 1912. In 1913, it had 1,100 members and nine lodges. The association helped Slovenian immigrants settled in the United States. SDZ opened the Slovenian National Home office building at 6120 St. Clair Avenue in Cleveland in 1914.

SDZ started issuing real estate loans in 1914 and life insurance in the 1920s. It formed a department for juvenile members in 1919 and established its first English-speaking lodge in 1920. The juvenile department provided insurance for children under sixteen and operated juvenile lodges that provided educational, recreational, and public speaking opportunities. Starting in 1929, the fraternal order organized a supreme athletic league that oversaw basketball leagues, bowling clubs, and an annual sports Olympiad that featured a thirteen-mile run.

SDZ held it triannual statewide convention in Lorain, Ohio in 1925 and in Cleveland in 1931. In the 1930s, it participated in Cleveland's annual Slovenian Day celebration. SDZ first published its newspaper Our Voice (Glas Adz) in 1939 in both English and Slovenia. During World War II, SDZ raised money for the Red Cross. Its received its IRS ruling as a tax-empt 501(c)(8) organization in August 1942. It was a member of the Ohio Fraternal Congress in the 1940s an 1950s.

In the 1960s, SDZ had more than 20,000 members and 65 lodges. It started issuing college scholarships in 1962 and also established a youth chorus in Newburgh, Ohio. It assumed the name American Mutual Life Association (AMLA). In 1969, it opened a 110-acre recreational center in Leroy Township.

AMLA moved its headquarters to 19424 South Waterloo Road in Cleveland in 1981 and remains there as of 2025. It was the largest Slovenian-American organization in Ohio in 1994. The next year, AMLA had $21 million in assets and $23.5 million in insurance. It is a member of the American Fraternal Alliance.

== Activities ==
AMLA is a fraternal benefit society that also helps preserve Slovenian culture. It is licensed to sell life insurance and annuity products in Ohio. In addition to social events for its members, it provides educational scholarships, coordinates charitable activities like food drives, and supports community organizations. It also sponsors the Summer Zabava, a Slovenian cultural event in Cleveland, Ohio.

== Scandals and member misconduct ==
In 1955, Max Traven was charged with embezzling $1,215.55 from SDZ and making false reports to the state superintendent of insurance while serving as the supreme secretary of SDZ from 1946 and 1953. He was found not guilty of these charges after a trial that lasted four weeks.

== See also ==
- Slovene Americans
- List of U.S. organizations of migrants from Austria-Hungary
- History of Slovenes in Cleveland
