= Emilija Bucik Razman =

Slovenian painter and illustrator (1935–2024)

- Born: Emilija Bucik; July 16, 1935; Gorizia, Italy
- Died: June 28, 2024 (aged 88); Palm Harbor, Florida, United States
- Education: Academy of Fine Arts and Design
- Occupations: Painter, illustrator, cook

Emilija Bucik Razman (Note: She was also known as Mimi Bucik-Razman and Emilia Bucik-Razman.) (16 July 1935 – 28 June 2024) was a Slovenian-American painter and illustrator. She studied painting at the Academy of Fine Arts in Ljubljana and initially worked as an artist in the Slovenian Littoral, mostly painting sacred art. She emigrated to the United States in 1969 and settled in Chicago, where she continued to paint and became active in the Slovene-American community. She was particularly known for her landscapes depicting Slovenia and for her illustrations for Zarja, the magazine of the Slovenian Women's Union of America.

Emilija Bucik Razman in her youth.

== Early life ==
She was born on 16 July 1935 in Gorizia as the second child of a devout Catholic Slovenian family. Her mother, Emilija Makarovič (1909–2000), and her father, Ivan Bucik (1902–1992), were both farmers from Kanalski Vrh. She had eight siblings, of whom one sister and five brothers survived to adulthood. She grew up on the family farm in Kanalski Vrh. She studied painting at the Academy of Fine Arts (now the Academy of Fine Arts and Design of the University of Ljubljana).

== Career ==
=== In Slovenia ===
After completing her studies, she returned to the Slovenian Littoral, where she worked primarily in religious art and landscape painting. She married at a young age and had three daughters between 1964 and 1967. During this period, she painted several ceiling frescoes at the Franciscan monastery of Kostanjevica near Nova Gorica. She also painted several chapels in the Gorizia region. Her work also included landscapes depicting the Gorizia region and the Slovenian coast of the Adriatic Sea.

=== In the United States ===
In 1969, she emigrated to the United States with her daughters as a single mother. She settled in Chicago, where her younger sister was already living. Her sister had initially come to the United States as a maidservant and later became Chicago's first female bus driver. Her elder brother, Janko Bucik, who worked as a designer under the name John Bucci, also lived there. Her parents later emigrated to the United States as well. In Chicago, she worked as a cook, which remained her principal occupation until her retirement. She became a United States citizen in 1990. Alongside her employment, she continued to paint. Her subjects consisted mainly of landscapes, still lifes, and wildlife scenes, as well as some portraits. Among her works was a 1977 portrait of Marie Černe Prisland, a publicist, editor and co-founder of the Slovenian Women's Union of America, and a painting of Frederic Baraga for St. Joseph's Church in Joliet, Illinois, completed in 1976. Her landscapes depicting Slovenia were particularly popular among Slovene Americans. In February 1971, she held a successful exhibition of her work at the Bled Slovenian Home in Chicago. In May of that year, she exhibited her work in Cleveland. In November 1971, she exhibited still lifes, landscapes and portraits in the cultural pavilion of an international exhibition at Navy Pier in Chicago. She subsequently participated in numerous other exhibitions in the United States. She was active in Chicago's Slovene community. In subsequent years, she created stage decorations and scenery for its Slovenian Day celebrations, including a depiction of Bled with the church on its island. Her postcards featuring Slovenian motifs were also popular.

==== Slovenian Women's Union of America and Zarja ====
In April 1971, she and her sister joined Branch No. 2 of the Slovenian Women's Union of America (SWUA; later the Slovenian Union of America) in Chicago. This marked the beginning of her more than three decades of collaboration with the union's magazine, Zarja (The Dawn), which was edited by Corinne Novak-Leskovar. The first issue of Zarja to feature her illustrations was the May 1971 issue (volume 43, number 5), which was dedicated to Mother's Day.

== Later life and death ==
Her final contribution to Zarja appeared in 2003. The following year, she retired and moved to Palm Harbor, Florida, where her eldest daughter, a pediatrician, was employed. She died of cancer in Palm Harbor on 28 June 2024. She was buried there.
