= Slovene Americans =

Americans of Slovene birth or descent

Slovene Americans Ameriški Slovenci
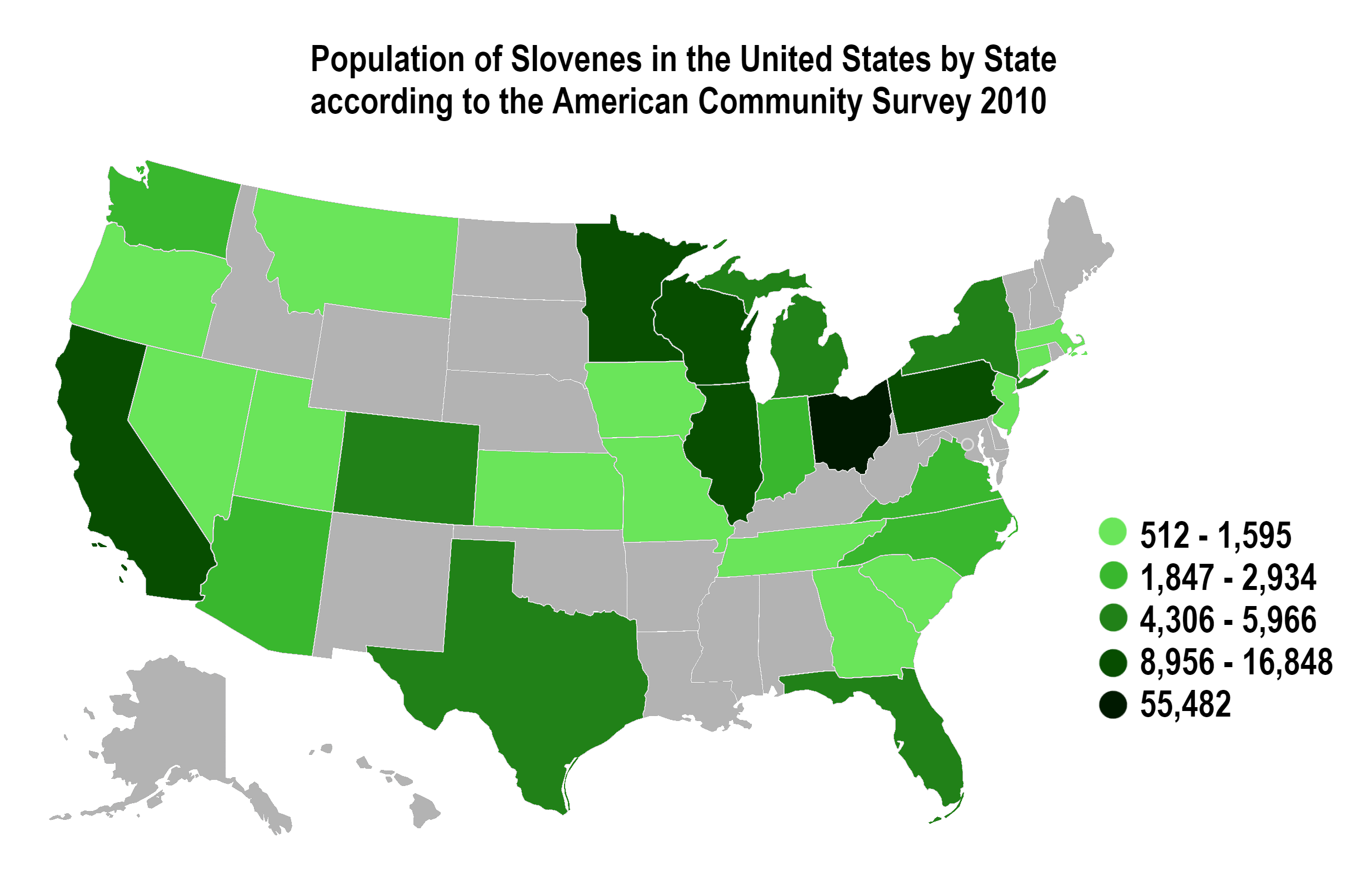
- Map showing the population of Slovenes in the United States by state according to the American Community Survey 2010

Total population
- 171,617 (2024)

Regions with significant populations
- Ohio (Greater Cleveland), Kansas (Kansas City), Pennsylvania, Illinois, Minnesota, Wisconsin, California, Indiana, Colorado, Michigan, Maine, Oregon, Texas

Languages
- American English, Slovene

Religion
- Roman Catholic, Lutheran

Related ethnic groups
- White Americans, Slovene Canadians

Slovene Americans or Slovenian Americans are Americans of full or partial Slovene or Slovenian ancestry. Slovenes mostly immigrated to America during the Slovene mass emigration period from the 1880s to World War I.

== History ==
The first Slovenes in the United States were Catholic missionary priests in the early 19th century. Two of the earliest such missionaries were Anton Kappus and Frederic Baraga. Many of these early immigrants were bilingual Slovene–German speakers. Baraga's sister Antonija Höffern became the first Slovene woman to immigrate to the United States in 1837.

The peak of emigration from what is now Slovenia was between 1860 and 1914; during this period, between 170,000 and 300,000 left areas that are now part of Slovenia. By 1880 there were around 1,000 Slovene Americans, many of whom worked in the Upper Midwest as miners; within 30 years, about 30,000 to 40,000 Slovenian immigrants lived in the area of Cleveland, Ohio, the center of Slovene American culture. The early waves of migrants were predominantly single men, many of whom (over 36% in the period 1899–1924) returned home after earning money in the United States, mostly in unskilled labor. Many stayed, however, and Slovene women followed in settling in the United States.

In 1914, Cleveland was the third most-populous Slovene city in the world, after Trieste and Ljubljana. Within Cleveland, Slovene Americans developed their own cultural and social institutions, including Slovene-owned groceries, bars, furniture stores, clothing shops, and other businesses; Catholic parishes and elementary schools; mutual aid and fraternal societies; and even a Slovene bank (established in St. Clair, Cleveland in 2010). By the 1930s, five out of 32 members of the Cleveland City Council were Slovene. Most Slovene Americans living in Cleveland eventually moved to the city's suburbs, although cultural institutions within the city limits remain significant. The Cleveland metropolitan area remains home to the largest population of Slovenians in the world outside of Slovenia.

Later Slovene arrivals migrated to the industrial cities or to mining towns in the Upper Midwest, Ohio and Pennsylvania. Two later periods of increased immigration to the United States were the years immediately after World War I (1919–1923) and World War II (1949–1956). Slovene post–World War II migrants consisted primarily of political refugees fleeing Josip Broz Tito's communist regime in Yugoslavia; this group of migrants was generally older and better educated than earlier waves of Slovene migrants.

Among Slovene immigrants, some were devoutly Catholic, while others were secular and anticlerical, with some holding liberal or socialist views. The division between the two groups was a prominent feature of Slovene-American communal life for much of the 20th century. A minority of Slovene immigrants practiced the Lutheran faith.

In the state of Michigan there are Baraga County, Baraga, Michigan, Baraga Township, Baraga Correctional Facility and Baraga State Park which are named after the Slovene missionary Frederic Baraga. The town of St. Stephen, Minnesota, was initially called Sveti Štefan v gozdu or Sveti Štefan v gozdovih (literally, 'Saint Stephen in the Woods'); its roots date back to the 19th century, when it was founded by Slovene immigrants to the United States. It later became the city of Saint Stephen northwest of Minneapolis.

== Demographics ==
Slovene language in the United States

=== Large concentrations ===
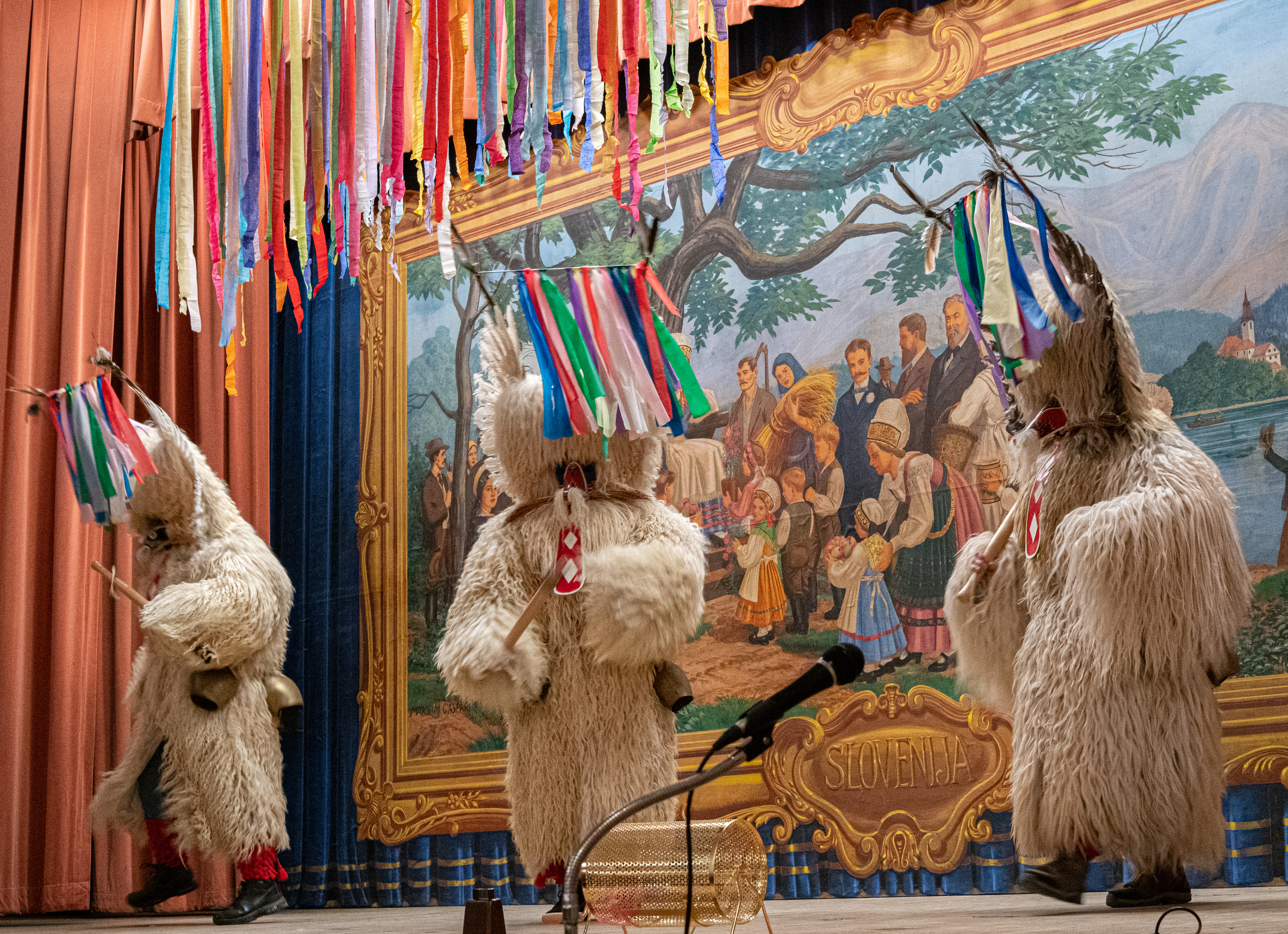
Slovenian Kurentovanje kurenti in Cleveland, Ohio, United States

- Cleveland, Ohio
- Chicago, Illinois
- Indianapolis, Indiana
- Milwaukee, Wisconsin
- Chisholm, Minnesota
- Eveleth, Minnesota
- Ely, Minnesota
- Fontana, California
- San Francisco, California

The Slovene population in the United States has been historically concentrated in the Great Lakes and Northeastern United States including Ohio, Pennsylvania, Illinois, Wisconsin, Minnesota and Colorado. Three quarters of Slovene Americans live in six states:

- Ohio – 80,000
- California - 20,000
- Pennsylvania – 15,000
- Illinois – 12,000
- Minnesota – 7,000
- Wisconsin - 6,500

=== Numbers ===
In 1910 census reported 183,431 people of Slovene mother tongue living in the United States. By the time of the 1920 census, that figure had increased to 208,552. Following the enactment of restrictive immigration laws in the 1920s, the number of Slovenes immigrating to the United States declined. The 1990 census reported 124,437 Slovene-identifying people. According to the data for the year 2000, 175,099 persons identified themselves as Slovenian, which indicates a (positive) shift in self-image or the perception of Slovenian identity. It is estimated that in the USA live around 300,000 Americans of Slovene descent.

== Fraternal, benevolent, social and cultural organizations ==
In the late 19th century and early 20th century, Slovene Americans established a variety of social groups, including fraternal organizations, mutual insurance, and self-help societies, and cultural and educational institutions, such as choral and drama societies, gymnastics groups, and Slovene-language newspapers. The establishment of Slovene American insurance companies allowed immigrants to protect themselves against discrimination and fraud. A number of mergers and name changes took place during the 20th century, Some Slovene American fraternal, benevolent, social, and cultural organizations include:

- Jugoslovenska katoliška jednota (South Slavic Catholic Union), founded in Ely, MN in 1898, became American Fraternal Union (AFU) in 1941.
- Kranjsko-slovenska katoliška jednota, (Carnolan Slovene Catholic Union) founded in Joliet in 1894, became the Ameriško-slovenska katoliška jednota or American Slovenian Catholic Union (KSKJ).
- Slovenska narodna podporna jednota, founded in Chicago in 1904, became Slovene National Benefit Society (SNPJ).
- Zahodna slovanska veza, founded in 1908, became Western Slavonic Association (WSA).
- Indianapolis Slovenian National Home, founded in 1918.
- Slovenska dobrodelna zveza (Slovenian Mutual Benefit Association), founded in Cleveland in 1910; became American Mutual Life Association (AMLA) in 1966.

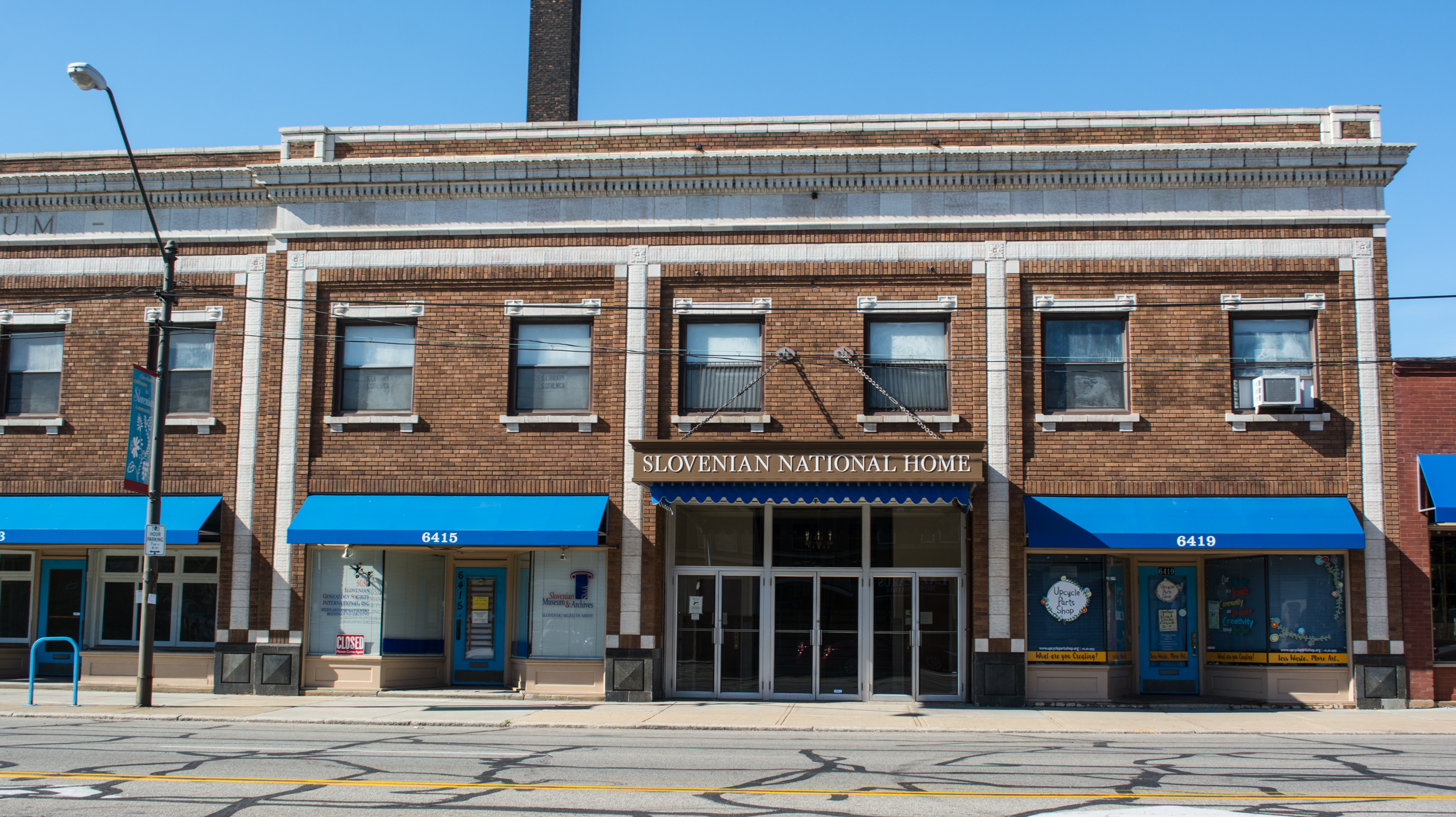
Slovenian National Home in the St. Clair–Superior neighborhood of Cleveland, Ohio

- Slovenski Narodni Dom (Slovenian National Home), Cleveland; founded in 1914.
- Progresivne Slovenke Amerike (Progressive Slovene Women of America) (PSWA), founded in 1934.
- Slovenska ženska zveza Amerike, founded in Chicago in 1926, became Slovenian Women's Union of America (SWUA), and now Slovenian Union of America (SUA).
- Slovenian Catholic Center, also known as Slovenian Cultural Center, Lemont, IL
- Slovenian Cultural Society Triglav, Norway, WI; founded in 1952.
- National Cleveland-style Polka Hall of Fame and Museum, Cleveland
- American Slovenian Club of Fairport Harbor, Fairport Harbor, OH
- Slovene Home for the Aged, Cleveland
- Slovenian Museum and Archives, Cleveland
- Slovenska Pristava, Harpersfield, OH; Slovenian Catholic recreation and retreat center
- Slovensko društvo New York (Slovenian Society New York)
- Slovenian National Home, Chisholm, MN (closed)
- Slovenian Hall, Fontana, CA (slated for demolition)

The Slovenian Genealogy Society, International helps members trace their Slovene roots.

== Slovene churches and choirs in the United States ==
A total of 39 Slovene parishes were established in the United States. The first Slovene national parish with a Slovene priest was formed in 1891 in Chicago. Four Slovene parishes were subsequently established on the east side of Cleveland: St. Vitus's (Sveti Vit) (established 1893); St. Lawrence (established 1901); St. Mary of the Assumption (1905), and St. Christine's (1925). St. Vitus's eventually grew to encompass a school and convent; a large new church in the Lombard Romanesque style, was built in 1932.

St. Cyril Roman Catholic Church in the East Village, Manhattan, was established in 1916 as a Slovene parish. Holy Family Roman Catholic Church was established in 1908 in Kansas City, Kansas by immigrants from Lower Carniola.

Shrine of Bishop Baraga
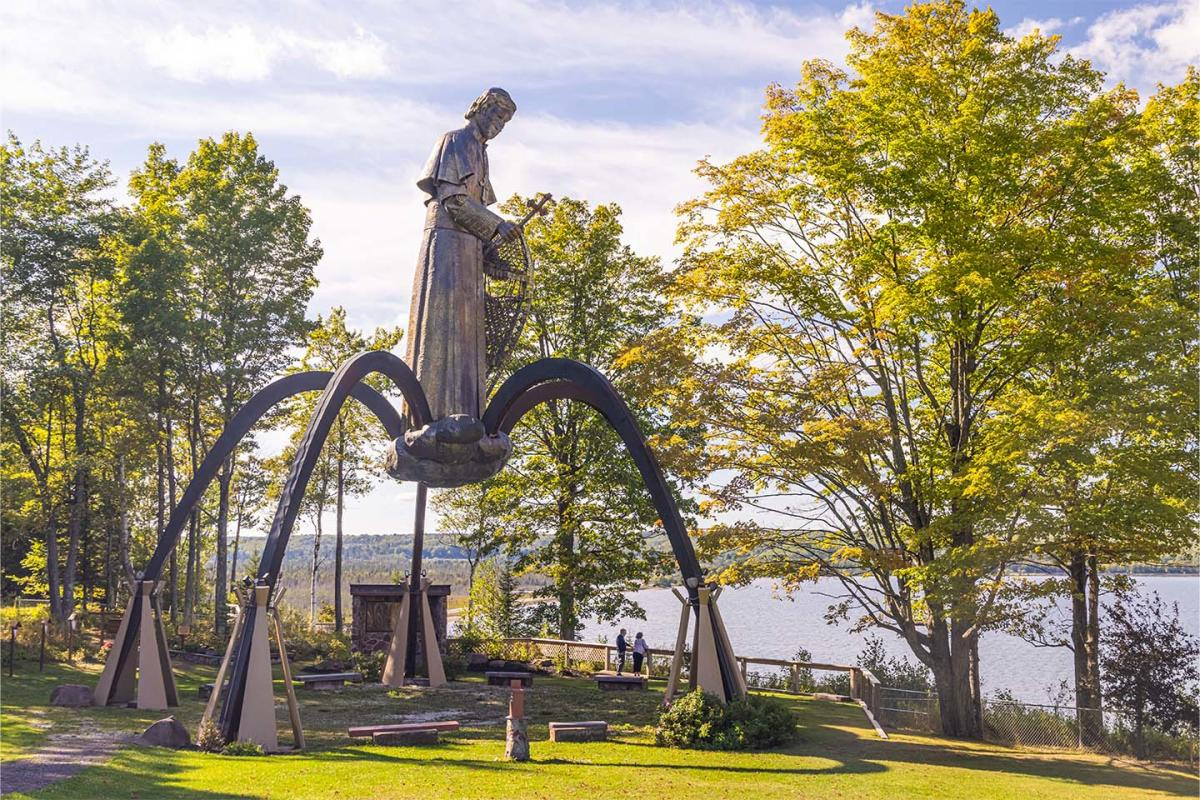

The Slovenian Chapel of Our Lady of Brezje, in the Basilica of the National Shrine of the Immaculate Conception, Washington, D.C., is the dedicated Slovenian National Marian Shrine, founded in 1971.

Multiple Slovene choruses have been formed, including The Singing Slovenes in Duluth, Minnesota (founded in 1980), the Ely Slovenian Chorus in Ely, Minnesota (founded in 1969 by Mary Hutar, final performance in 2009); the Fantje na vasi (Boys from the Village) men's a cappella choir in Cleveland (founded in 1977); and the Zarja Singing Society, Cleveland (founded in 1916).

== Slovene schools in the United States ==
- St. Vitus Child Slovenian Language School, Cleveland
- St. Mary Slovenian Language School, Cleveland
- Slomškova slovenska šola / Slomšek Slovenian School, Lemont, IL

== Media ==
The first newspaper established by Slovene Americans was Ameriški Slovenec (American Slovene), which was published in Chicago beginning in 1891 and subsequently in Cleveland. It originally had three versions: a Slovene-language edition, a standard English edition, and an English edition with Slovene phonetic spelling. The newspaper continues today as a weekly.

Between 1891 and the 1990s, more than a hundred other Slovene-language newspapers and publications were established in the United States; only a handful were in print for more than a few years. The University of Minnesota Libraries has catalogued some 45 Slovene-language newspapers published in the United States in a variety of locations, including Pueblo, Denver, Milwaukee, Cleveland, Detroit, Pittsburgh, and New York.

== Notable people ==
- Joe Kenda – detective lieutenant
- George Kraigher – pilot
- Anna Clobuchar Clemenc – trade unionist
- Lana Rhoades – internet personality, podcaster and former pornographic film actress
- Michael Lah – animator
- Melania Trump – first lady of the United States and former model
- Barron Trump – son of Donald and Melania Trump
- John Jager - architect and urban planner
- Nick Kosir - television meteorologist

=== Actors ===
- Ami Dolenz – actor
- George Dolenz – actor
- Frank Gorshin – actor
- Željko Ivanek – actor
- Audrey Totter – actress
- Andrea True – actress
- Francine York – actress
- Donna Anderson – actress
- Ursula Parker – actress
- Rozalija Sršen – actress
- Laura La Plante – actress
- Mira Furlan – actress

=== Astronauts ===
- Jerry Linenger – astronaut
- Ronald Sega – astronaut
- Sunita Williams – astronaut
- Randolph Bresnik – astronaut

=== Bishops ===
- Friderik Baraga – missionary
- Ignacij Mrak – bishop
- Janez Vertin – bishop
- Janez Stariha – bishop
- Jakob Trobec – bishop and missionary
- Jožef Frančišek Buh – priest and missionary

=== Army ===
- Ferdinand Chesarek – general
- John Stephan Lekson – general
- Warren Joseph Pezdirtz – major-general
- Stanley Gorenc – major-general and army pilot
- Frank Gorenc – general and army pilot
- Ronald Zlatoper – admiral
- Jerome Edward Rupnik – rear admiral
- William F. Petrovic – admiral

=== Politicians ===
- Frank Lausche – governor, mayor and senator
- George Voinovich – governor, mayor and senator
- John Blatnik – congressman
- Tom Harkin – senator
- Dennis E. Eckart – politician
- Philip Ruppe – politician
- Jim Oberstar – congressman
- Paul Gosar – politician
- Amy Klobuchar – senator
- Michael Polensek - City Council member

=== Writers ===
- Louis Adamič – writer
- Ivan Molek – writer
- Jože Grdina – writer
- Anita Endrezze - poet, writer and artist

=== Engineers ===
- Joe Sutter – engineer
- Dušan Petrač – physicist
- Anton Mavretič – engineer
- Zvonko Fazarinc – computer scientist
- France Rode – engineer and inventor
- Franklin R. Puhek - space expert

=== Painters ===
- Emilija Bucik Razman – painter
- Bogdan Grom – painter
- Gregor Perušek – painter

=== Comedy ===
- Anthony Jeselnik – comedian

=== Musicians ===
- Karen Kamensek – orchestral and operatic conductor
- Joey Miskulin – Grammy Award – winning musician and record producer
- Frankie Yankovic – Grammy Award – winning musician, known as "America's Polka King", popularized Slovenian-style polka
- "Weird Al" Yankovic – comedy performer known for his parodies of popular music
- Micky Dolenz – musician and actor (Drummer/Singer of The Monkees)
- Ivan Zorman - poet and composer
- Mary Udovich - singer

=== Sports ===
- Mike Adamle – American football player – Northwestern Wildcats and NFL – also a television and radio sports reporter and WWE wrestling announcer
- Tony Adamle – American football player – Ohio State Buckeyes and Cleveland Browns (member of 1950 and 1954 NFL Championship teams)
- Frank Brimsek – ice hockey player
- Luka Dončić – Basketball player
- Sasha Vujačić - Basketball player
- Bob Golic – American football player (Notre Dame Fighting Irish and NFL – Cleveland Browns, among other teams) – also an actor Saved by the Bell: The College Years
- Mike Golic – American football player (Notre Dame Fighting Irish and NFL – Philadelphia Eagles, among other teams) – also ESPN radio personality and host on Mike and Mike in the Morning
- Randy Gradishar – American football player (Ohio State Buckeyes and Denver Broncos)
- Sepp Kuss – professional cyclist
- Dan Majerle – basketball (NBA) player
- Anton Peterlin – soccer player
- Fritzie Zivic – boxer
- Mark Zupan – athlete, wheelchair rugby team captain
- Mark Kastelic - ice hockey player
- Jon Gruden - American football coach
- Ann Govednik - swimmer
- Jim Nesich - ice hockey player

== See also ==
- European Americans
- Slovene Canadians
- Slovene Australians
- Slovene Argentines
- Slovene communities in South America
- Slovenia–United States relations
