= SNPJ =

SNPJ can refer to:

- S.N.P.J., Pennsylvania, a borough in Pennsylvania, United States
- Slovene National Benefit Society (Slovene: Slovenska narodna podporna jednota), a fraternal organization
