= Milan Komar =

Slovene Argentine Catholic philosopher and essayist (1921–2006)

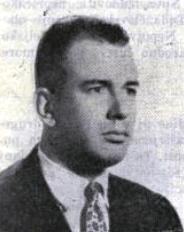
- Born: 4 June 1921; Ljubljana, Slovenia
- Died: 20 January 2006 (aged 84)

Philosophical work
- Era: 20th-century philosophy
- School: Neo-Scholasticism, Personalism, Christian Realism

Milan Komar, also known as Emilio Komar (4 June 1921 – 20 January 2006) was a Slovene Argentine Catholic philosopher and essayist.

== Life ==
He was born in Ljubljana, Slovenia, then part of the Kingdom of Serbs, Croats and Slovenes, to a Slovene family who had emigrated from the Italian-occupied Julian March. His father, Ludvik was a retired officer of the Austro-Hungarian Army. Milan spent his childhood in Ljubljana and Škofja Loka, and in 1939 he enrolled in the University of Ljubljana where he studied law. He specialized in Canonical law and continued his studies at the University of Turin, where he graduated in 1942. He first developed an interest in philosophy in Ljubljana, under the supervision of the Slovenian Neo-thomist thinker Aleš Ušeničnik and the Russian émigré Eugeni Vasilievitch Spektorsky (1875-1951), who thought philosophy of law at the University of Ljubljana. He further developed his philosophical knowledge in Turin under the influence of Giuseppe Gemellaro and Carlo Mazzantini. In those years, he also discovered the thought of French personalists such as Jacques Maritain and Emmanuel Mounier. He was also influenced by the political writings of Luigi Sturzo which were then circulating in the Catholic anti-Fascist underground.

Already as a student in Ljubljana, he became involved in a Catholic integralist youth group, organized within the Slovenian Catholic Action. This group, called Borci ("Fighters", after their internal journal, Mi mladi borci, that is "We, young fighters") had an anti-Communist ideology. To them, Communism was the greatest danger to humanity; nevertheless, they insisted to fight it on a cultural, intellectual and artistic field, rejecting both direct political engagement and armed struggle.

After the Capitulation of Italy in September 1943, Komar returned to Slovenia, which was then occupied by Nazi Germany. In the Slovenian Littoral, he joined the Slovenian National Defense Corps (Slovenski narodno varstveni zbor – SNVZ), a small collaborationist militia, closely affiliated to the Slovene Home Guard, which fought against the partisan resistance in the Julian March. Until 1945, he worked in the section for propaganda and culture, and helped to establish several cultural institutions (journals, publishing houses, schools) throughout the Goriška region. In May 1945, he withdrew to the Allied-occupied Northern Italy in order to escape Communist persecution. From there he emigrated to Argentina in 1948.

He settled in Buenos Aires, where he spent most of his later life. Initially, he worked as a manual worker in a glass factory, studying for the habilitation exam in philosophy and pedagogy. In the late 1940s, he started teaching philosophy and classical languages in different high schools, and later philosophy and pedagogy at the University of Buenos Aires. In 1959, started teaching history of modern philosophy at the Pontifical Catholic University of Argentina. From 1981 to 1982, he was dean of the Faculty for Philosophy at the same university. He retired from his teaching position in 1998.

During his time in emigration, he started to publish essays in the local Slovenian, as well as Spanish-language press. Nevertheless, he became famous especially as a teacher and a pedagogue and the so-called "Komar School" developed around him. In 1992, pope John Paul II gave him the insignia of the Order of St. Gregory the Great. He spent the last decades of his life in the town of Boulogne sur Mer in the Buenos Aires Province. He died at the age of 84 in the Argentine town of San Isidro and was buried in the Žale Cemetery in his native Ljubljana.

Komar was a polyglot: he was fluent in Slovenian, Spanish, Italian, German, Serbo-Croatian, French, Latin and Greek; he read also in Polish, Catalan and Portuguese.

== Thought ==
He started as an expert on the Rationalist philosophy of Christian Wolff and later turned to Kant and Hegel. He was an attentive critic of modern immanentist philosophy, which drew him closer to certain aspect of phenomenology, especially the current represented by Edith Stein. He was also strongly influenced by the thought of the Spanish philosopher José Ortega y Gasset and, to a lesser extent, Miguel de Unamuno. He later developed an interest in psychology, particularly Sigmund Freud, to whom he kept a respectful disaccord, and Erik Erikson.

He was also influenced by non-conformist Catholic thinkers such as G. K. Chesterton and Georges Bernanos, but he always remained connected to the Neo-Scholastic tradition, best exemplified by the thought of Étienne Gilson and Josef Pieper. In the mid 1960s, he developed a strong intellectual and personal friendship with the Italian philosopher and political scientist Augusto Del Noce, whom he regarded as his "spiritual brother". Together with him and with the Polish philosopher Stefan Swieżawski, he started to work on his uncompleted life project, namely the reperiodization of modern philosophy.

During the Communist regime, all his writings were prohibited in Slovenia; they were first published in the early 1990s, but his influence is still stronger in Latin America, in Spain and in Italy than in his native country.

== Major works ==
- Pot iz mrtvila (Buenos Aires, 1965)
- Apuntes filosóficos (Buenos Aires, 1973)
- Juliette o iluminismo y moral (Buenos Aires, 1974)
- Para una filosofía de la filiación (Buenos Aires, 1975)
- Fe y cultura (Buenos Aires, 1986)
- Partecipación: términos, etimologías, definiciones (Buenos Aires, 1986)
- Modernidad y postmodernidad (Buenos Aires, 1989)
- Orden y misterio (Buenos Aires, 1996)
- Iz dolge vigilije (Ljubljana, 2002)

== Sources ==
- Bojan Godeša, Kdor ni z nami, je proti nam: slovenski izobraženci med okupatorji, Osvobodilno fronto in protirevolucionarnim taborom (Ljubljana: Cankarjeva založba, 1995).
- Mitja Ogrin, "Milan Komar", preface to Milan Komar: Razmišljanja ob razgovorih (Ljubljana: Založba Družina, 2000)
- Igor Senčar, "Milan Komar", afterword to Milan Komar: Pot iz mrtvila (Ljubljana: Študentska založba, 1999)
- Enrique María Serra, "Milan Komar - Maestro de realismo vivido", Huellas, n.4/2006 (1.4. 2006)
