= WSA Fraternal Life, Inc =

Slovonic American benefit society

WSA Fraternal Life, Inc, known until 1989 as the Western Slavonic Association (WSA), or Zapadna Slovanska Zveza, is an ethnic fraternal benefit and social organization for Slovene immigrants and their descendants in the United States. Its activities have included visiting the sick and bereaved, offering college scholarship, promoting Slavic culture and organizing trips to Yugoslavia (before the violent break up of that country). WSA publishes a newspaper, The Fraternal Voice.

In June 1995, the group merged with the Sociedad Protección Mutua de Trabajodores Unidos (Mutual Society for United Workers). The merger was completed in January 1996. The SPMTU continues to operate its own lodges and fraternal activities, while WSA administrates their insurance certificates.

Membership was opened to people of all nationalities and ancestries in 1958. There were 13,000 members in 1965, 10,000 in 1978 (in 41 lodges in five states) and 9,500 in 1995. In The headquarters of the WSA is located in Westminster, Colorado.

In the mid 1990s it was licensed to sell insurance in Colorado, Utah, Minnesota and Pennsylvania and had a permanent staff of four. As of 2013, it also has a license in Illinois, New Mexico, Ohio and South Dakota.

== See also ==
- Slovenian Americans
