= Argentina–Slovenia relations =

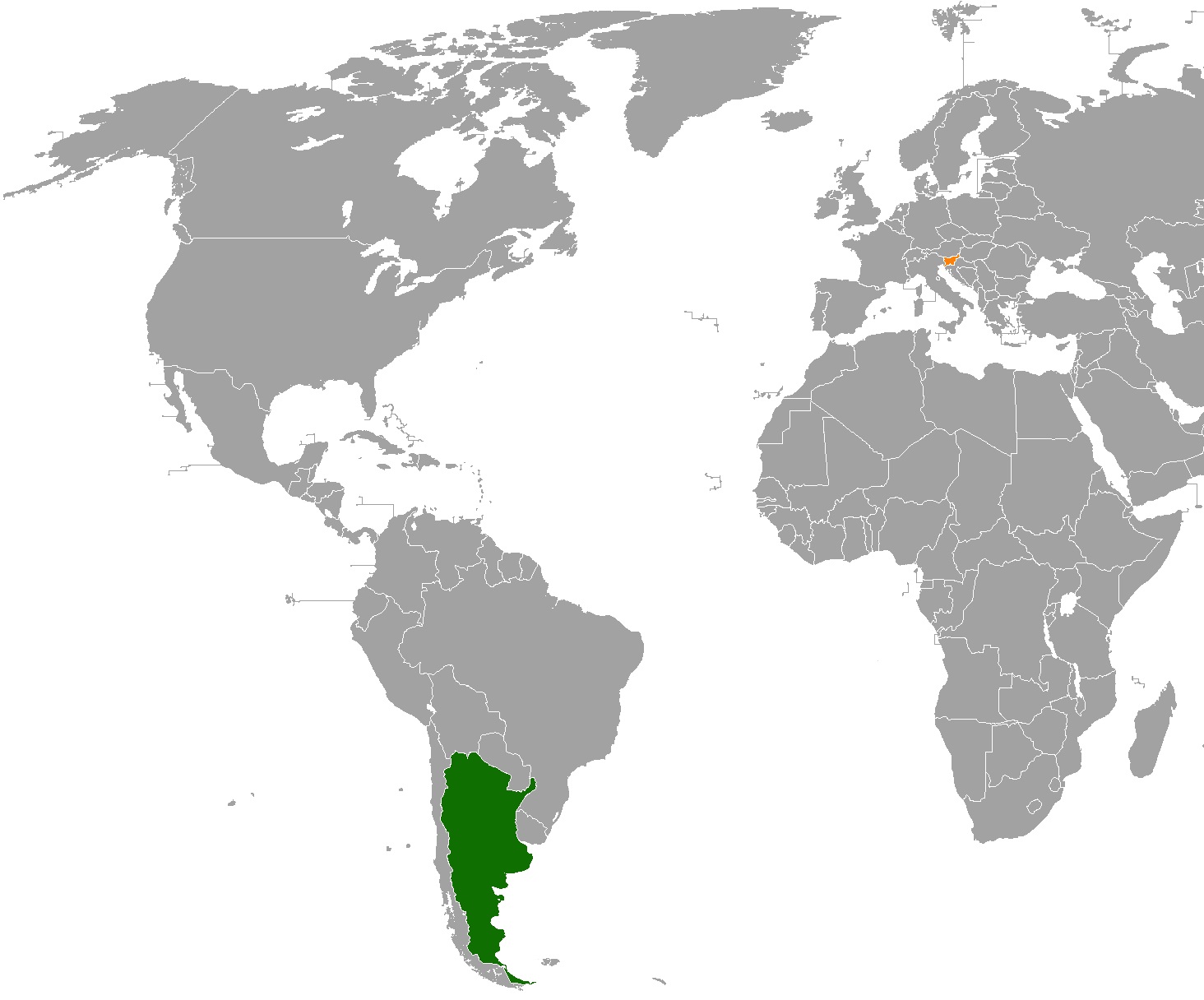

- Argentina: Slovenia

Argentina–Slovenia relations refers to the bilateral relationship between Argentina and Slovenia. Argentina is accredited to Slovenia from its embassy in Vienna, Austria, while Slovenia has an embassy in Buenos Aires. Both nations are members of the United Nations.

== History ==
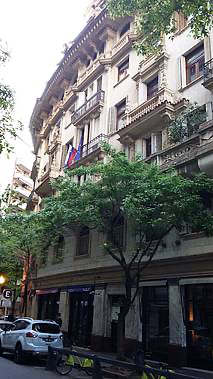
Embassy of Slovenia in Buenos Aires

Bilateral relations between Argentina and Slovenia can be dated back to early 20th century when the economic immigrants from the Prekmurje region and the Hungarian Slovenes immigrated to Argentina, They are concentrated mainly in Buenos Aires and Greater Buenos Aires, San Carlos de Bariloche and Mendoza, with some smaller communities settled in Rosario, San Miguel de Tucumán and Paraná.

Argentina officially recognized Slovenia's Independence on 16 January 1992, and diplomatic relations was established on 13 April 1992. Argentina is accredited to Slovenia through its embassy in Vienna, Austria. While Slovenia has an embassy in Buenos Aires.

== Cultural relations ==
Some Argentine universities, such as University of Buenos Aires, National University of Córdoba provides Slovene language courses, besides, there are also a few Slovene cultural associations in Argentina, which would become cultural ties between these two countries.

== State visit ==
In 2016, Borut Pahor becomes the first Slovene president to make an official visit to Argentina.

== Resident diplomatic missions ==
- Argentina is accredited to Slovenia from its embassy in Vienna, Austria.
- Slovenia has an embassy in Buenos Aires.

== See also ==
- Foreign relations of Argentina
- Foreign relations of Slovenia
- Slovene Argentines
