= Slovene Australians =

Total population
- 21,341 (By ancestry, 2021); 5,076 (Slovenian-born in 2021)

Regions with significant populations
- Primarily New South Wales

Languages
- Australian English · Slovene

Religion
- Christianity (Catholic (4,114), Eastern Orthodox (92))

Related ethnic groups
- Slovene Americans, Slovene Canadians

Slovene Australians are Australian citizens who are fully or partially of Slovene descent or Slovenia-born people who reside in Australia.

== History ==
Central European people called Slovenians began migrating to Australia in the mid-nineteenth century. Until the 1900s, there was only a small number of Slovenian immigrants to Australia. The largest number of Slovenians migrated to Australia after World Wars One and Two. The exact number who came after WW1 is impossible to determine because Slovenians were often classified as Austrians.

A lot of Slovenian Axis collaborators and their families migrated to Australia after World War II, fleeing persecution by the post-war socialist government of Josip Broz Tito.

== Demographics ==
=== Numbers ===
In the 2001 Australian Census, 14,189 Australians declared that they were of Slovenian origin. In the 2006 Australian Census, 16,093 Australians declared that they were of Slovenian origin. Because many Slovenians came from the Austro-Hungarian Empire they identified themselves as Austrians.

=== Distribution ===
According to the 2016 Australian Census, there were 5,557 Slovenian-born people living in the country. The majority of them lived in either Victoria (2,172 or 39.1%) or New South Wales (1,773 or 31.9%).

== Notable individuals ==
- Paula Gruden - poet, translator and editor
- Tanya Plibersek - politician
- Lyenko Urbanchich - political activist
- Aurelio Vidmar - former football player and football manager
- Tony Vidmar - former football player and football manager
- Mitchell Starc - cricket player
- Milan Faletic - football player
- Dana Faletic - olympic athlete
- Damian Mori - former football player and assistant coach
- Ivan Rijavec - architect
- Dayne Zorko - football player
- Stan Rapotec - artist
- Misha Lajovic - politician
- Dušan Brešan - comics artist, illustrator and animator

== See also ==
- European Australians
- Europeans in Oceania
- Immigration to Australia
- Slovene Americans
- Slovene Argentines
- Slovene Canadians
