= Slovene diaspora =

Slovene diaspora in the world (includes people with Slovenian ancestry or citizenship). Slovenia + 100,000 + 10,000 + 1,000

The Slovene diaspora includes an autochthonous Slovene minority in Italy, estimated at 83,000–100,000, a Slovene minority in southern Austria at 24,855, in Croatia at 13,200, and a Slovene minority in Hungary at 3,180.

A significant Slovene expatriate community lives in the United States with most immigration occurring during the period between 1870 and 1924. Most notably is the Greater Cleveland area of Northeast Ohio, home to the highest concentration outside Europe (50,000‒80,000) and the largest number of Slovene speakers in the country. Sizeable Slovene communities also exist in other European countries, in Argentina, Brazil, Venezuela, Australia, Canada and the United Kingdom.
