= Kanalski Vrh =

Kanalski Vrh Vrh (until 1952)
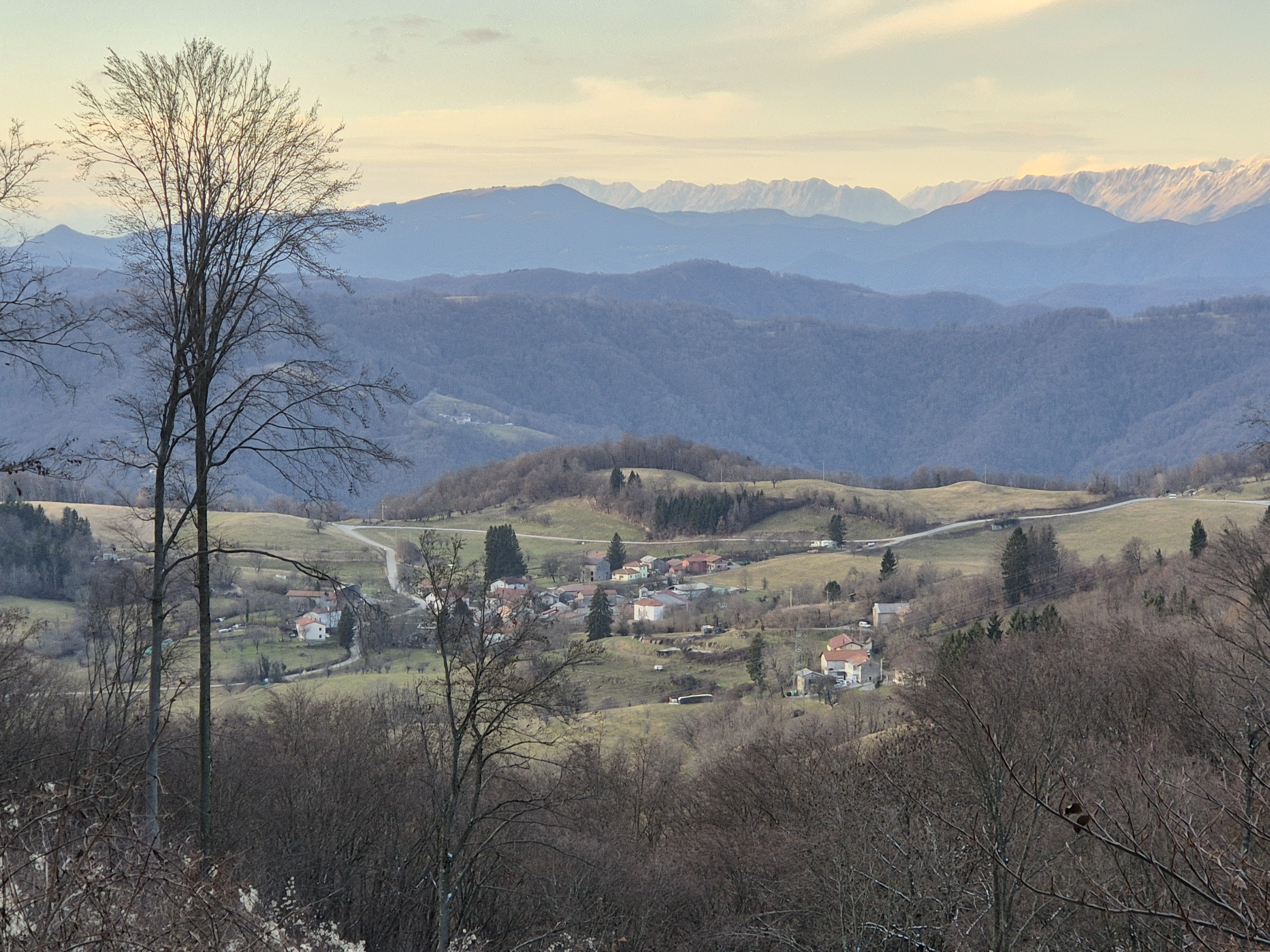

- Location in Slovenia
- Coordinates: 46°4′37.67″N 13°39′45.05″E
- Country: Slovenia
- Traditional region: Littoral
- Statistical region: Gorizia
- Municipality: Kanal ob Soči

Area
  - Total: 4.52 km^{2} (1.75 sq mi)
- Elevation: 588.9 m (1,932 ft)

Population (2002)
  - Total: 60

Kanalski Vrh (pronounced [kaˈnaːlski ˈʋəɾx] or [kaˈnaːu̯ski ˈʋəɾx]) is a village in the hills above Kanal in the Littoral region of Slovenia. Avče pumped storage hydropower plant is located at the village. It is run by Soške elektrarne Nova Gorica, and also features a solar power plant.

== Name ==
The name of the settlement was changed from Vrh to Kanalski Vrh in 1952.

== Church ==
The local church is dedicated to Saint Anthony the Hermit and belongs to the Parish of Kanal.

== Notable persons ==
- Emilija Bucik Razman, painter and illustrator (1935, Gorizia – 2024, Palm Harbor, Florida); she spent her childhood in Kanalski Vrh
