= Bohemian Citizens' Benevolent Society =

- Bohemian Hall and Park
- U.S. National Register of Historic Places
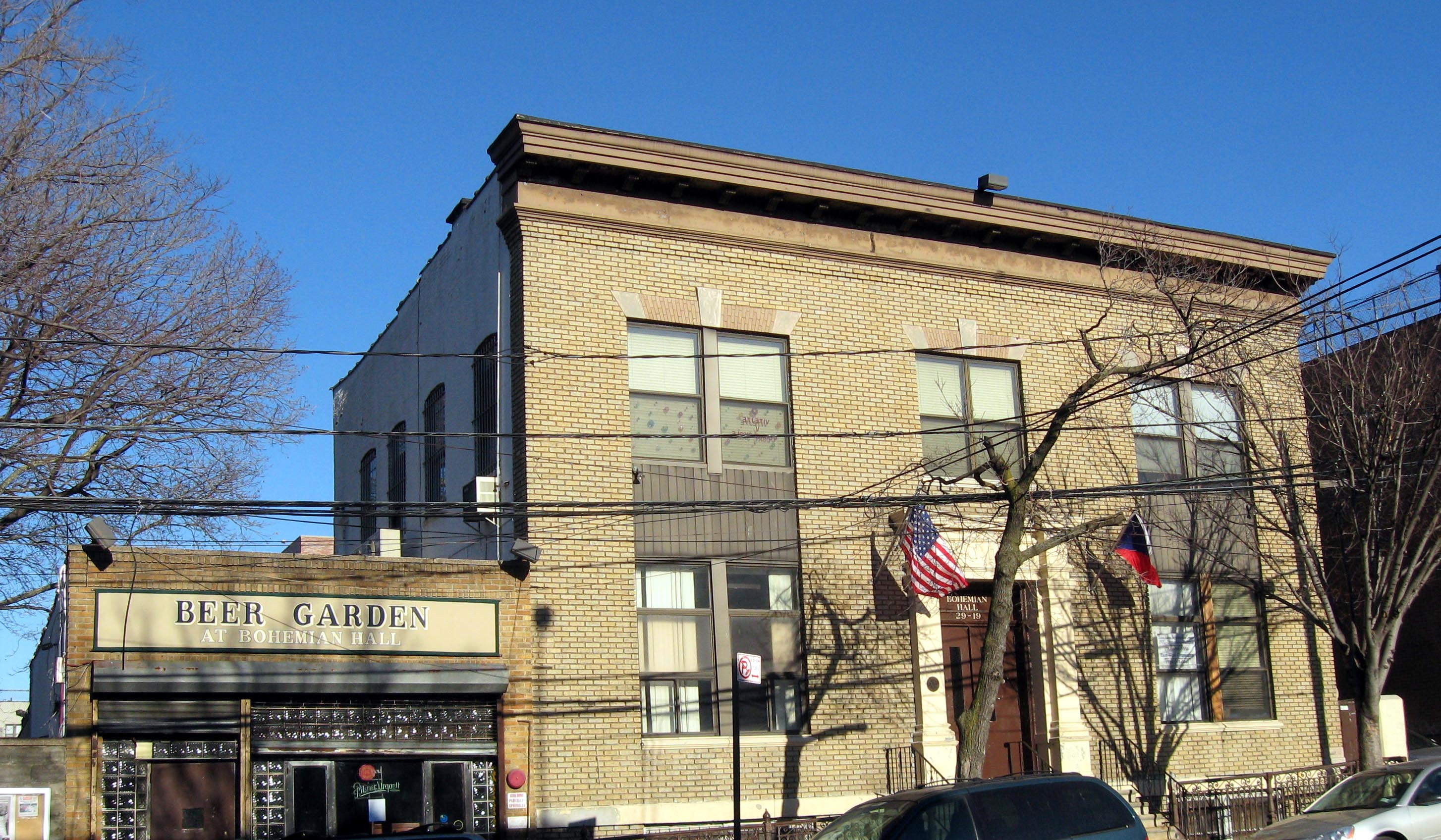
- Bohemian Hall, January 2009

- Location within New York City Location within New York Location within the United States
- Location: 29-19 24th Avenue, Astoria, Queens, New York, U.S. 11105
- Coordinates: 40°46′22″N 73°54′59″W
- Area: less than one acre
- Built: 1910
- Architect: Chmelik, Frank
- Architectural style: Classical Revival
- NRHP reference No.: 01000239
- Added to NRHP: March 23, 2001

The Bohemian Citizens' Benevolent Society is a private benevolent society founded in 1892 in Astoria, Queens, to support Czech and Slovak immigrants to the area, as well as people of Czech and Slovak ancestry. The society is commonly known as "Bohemian Hall" after its clubhouse, which is listed on the National Register of Historic Places.

== Description ==
The founders of the organization said that the purpose of the society is to encourage, support, and maintain Bohemian schools, dramatics, and libraries for Czech children and children of Czech heritage; to maintain a non-profit-making home social for Czechs and people of Czech ancestry in which the Czech culture may be taught and blended with American traditions and culture which makes the people better Americans. The organization has an annual revenue of $1,000,000 and employs a staff of approximately 14. The current president of the organization is Alan Svoboda.

== Bohemian Hall and Beer Garden ==
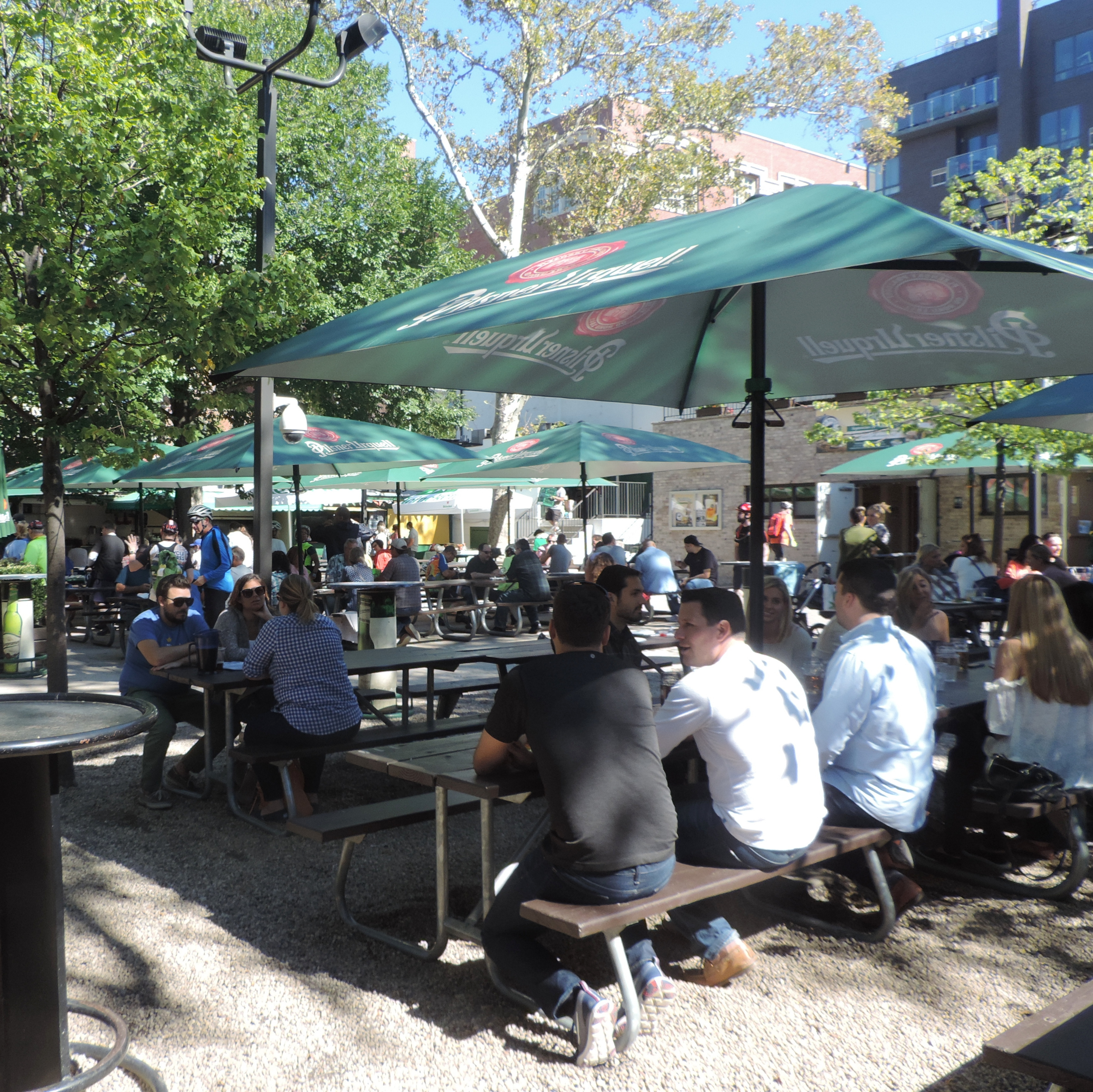
Beer garden

The Bohemian Hall and Beer Garden has a big indoor and outdoor bar complex. The bar complex can hold 800 people and is open year-round. Food that the bar serves is Czech specialties. There is a linden tree that was planted by Václav Havel. There are old signs and flags from the Czech Republic inside the bar. There are beers from the Czech Republic and Slovakia like Golden Pheasant, BrouCzech, Pilsner Urquell, Krušovice, Czechvar, and Staropramen. Most of the workers speak Czech and English. Most of the regular people that are there are middle-aged and elderly immigrants. The Hall hosts holiday parties, ethnic festivals, local jazz groups, Czech rock bands, and touring acts. The Bohemian Hall hosts the annual Czech and Slovak festival. The hall also has a Sokol club and a Czech and Slovak language school. The Bohemian Hall keeps the people linked, visually and materially, to the past.

=== Closure ===
Revenue was so low in the early 1990s that the hall threatened to close. A large group of people, not all Czech, started a "Save the Hall" meeting. Václav Havel, the former president of Czechoslovakia, was so moved by the outcome of the meeting that when he stopped by in 2000 he stayed for hours and held a conference.
