= Slovene communities in South America =

People of Slovene descent in South America

Slovene communities in South America refer to groups of people of Slovene ancestry living in various countries of South America. The first Slovenes arrived in South America in the late 19th and early 20th centuries, primarily from the Slovene Littoral region, and settled in countries such as Argentina, Brazil, Chile, Uruguay, and Venezuela. Slovenes arrived in South America for various reasons, including economic opportunities and political turmoil in Slovenia at the time. Many Slovenes found work in agriculture, industry, and trade in South America, and were able to build successful lives for themselves and their families.

Today, these communities have grown to be significant contributors to the cultural and economic life of their adopted countries, despite facing a multitude of challenges. The largest Slovene community in South America is in Argentina, with an estimated 30,000 people of Slovene descent. These communities have maintained their Slovene cultural heritage through various organizations, such as cultural associations, religious groups, and language schools. Many of these organizations have a long-standing history and continue to play an important role in preserving Slovene culture in South America. These communities have maintained their Slovene heritage and contributed to the diversity of South American society.

== Challenges ==
Slovene communities in South America have faced challenges in preserving their cultural identity and language due to assimilation pressures from the dominant Spanish or Portuguese cultures. Political instability and economic turmoil have forced many Slovenes to leave their homes and struggle to make a living, with limited institutional support to access resources and preserve their cultural heritage. In addition, opportunities for face-to-face interaction and cultural exchange have been limited due to the great physical distance between Slovenia and South America. Despite these challenges, they have made significant contributions to their adopted countries' cultural and economic life, strengthening the bond between Slovenia and South America. More recently they have been able to stay connected with their homeland through various modern means of communication such as phone and internet services.

== Cultural activity ==
The formation of independent Slovenia encouraged the revival of ethnic identity among the descendants of pre-war emigrants. In Argentina, where the largest number of people of Slovenian descent live, a new model of cultural activity has emerged, which includes cooperation with the homeland. There has been an upsurge in the number of Slovenian groups from abroad touring Slovenia, including choirs, bands and artists. Slovenian artists and groups from the home country are also increasingly touring abroad.

In the 19th century, Slovenians who settled in Brazil and on the Argentine-Paraguayan border and in the Argentine provinces of Entre Rios and Santa Fe did not organise any associations or other forms of national cultural activity. However, a new era began with the mass emigration of Slovenians to South America in the period between the world wars, when around 30,000 of them are said to have come to the continent. Communities were created in Argentina, Brazil, and Uruguay, which organized education, printing, religious, and cultural life. The activities of these communities, which were mostly of Slovene Littoral origin, were distinctly anti-fascist.

The most common types of cultural activity were choral music and theatre groups. The Gallus Choir in Buenos Aires was founded in 1948 by Julij Savelli. The choir has sung at various church and social events and has collaborated with other Slovenian associations and societies. An important branch was also architecture, where the most prominent representative was undoubtedly Tržič native Viktor Sulčič, who worked in Buenos Aires. Particularly noteworthy is the Triglav Society in Buenos Aires, which was initially a predominantly sports-oriented club but revived its cultural activities between 1991 and 1994. The club mainly features visits from Slovenia, art exhibitions, etc.

Post-war emigration was always very strong and well-organized, especially in the fields of education, culture, and religious life. Numerous singing, folk, reciting, and even theatre groups were created in local homes in Buenos Aires and in Bariloche, Mendoza, Córdoba, Argentina, and Miramar. Among the most famous is the Slovenian cultural institution in Argentina, called the Slovenian Cultural Action (Slovene: Slovenska kulturna akcija, SKA), which gained fame mainly for its publishing activities. Today, its activities are extensive as it is heavily involved in organizing art exhibitions, literary and debate evenings, etc. SKA has published over 200 books, in addition to publishing the Meddobje/Entresiglos magazine and the informational sheet Glas SKA.

There are many active folk dance groups of Slovenian emigrants in South America, especially in Argentina. In Buenos Aires, the Slovenian cultural centre Carapachay has the folk group Maribor, which presents Slovenian dances from all provinces and features several costumes. In the so-called Slovenian village of Lanús, there is a folk group of about 20 members, and there are Slovenian folk groups also in the towns of Mendoza and Bariloche. In Rosario, the pre-war emigration from the Slovene Littoral has its own folk group. In some Slovenian centres in Buenos Aires, such as San Justo Centre and Slomšek Centre, there is no regular folk group, but they perform on holidays and other special occasions.

== By country ==
=== Argentina ===
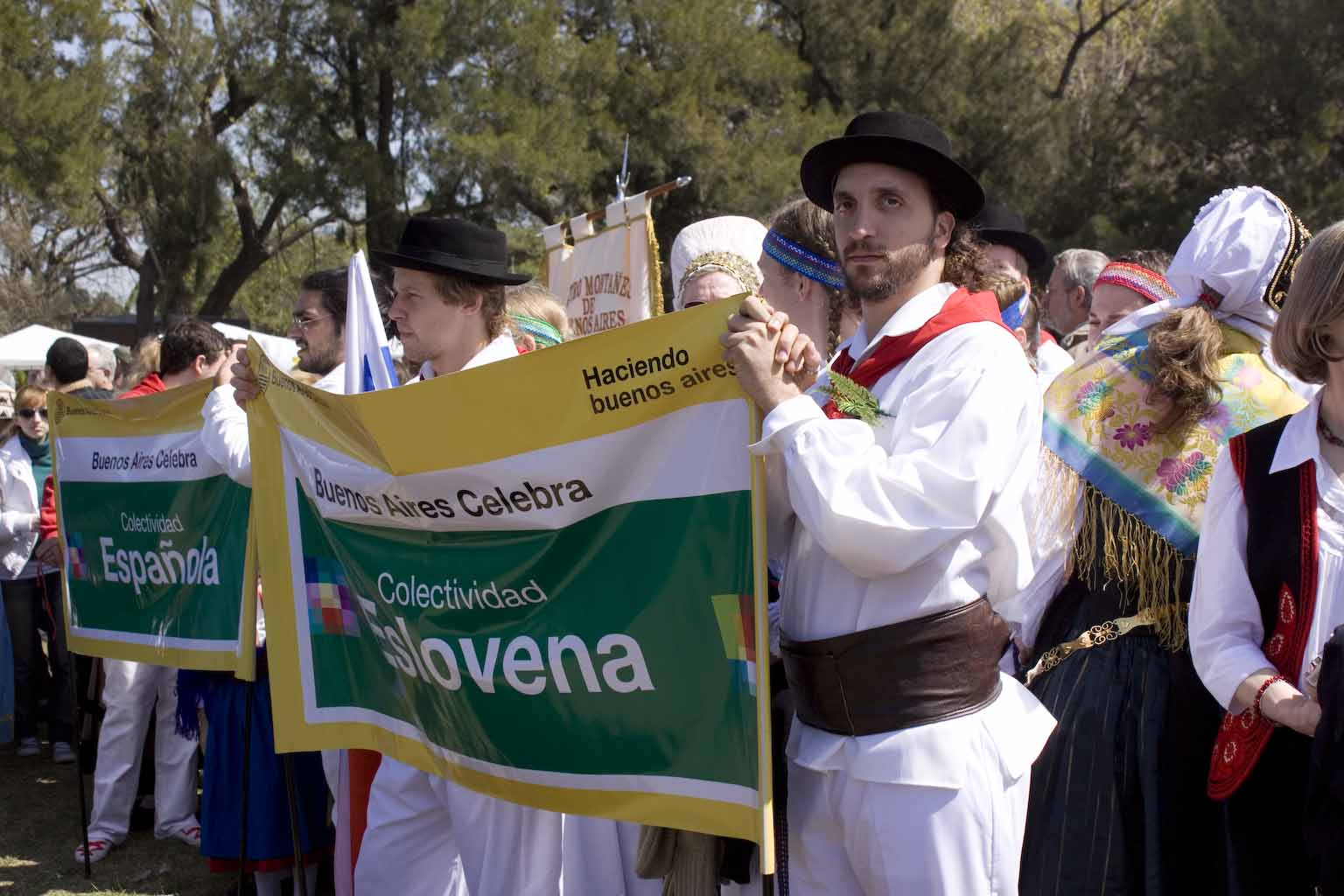
Slovene Argentines in Buenos Aires on Immigrant Day 2011.

Argentina is home to the largest Slovene community in South America, estimated at 30,000 Slovenes and their descendants. The majority of Slovene immigrants arrived in Argentina during the first three decades of the 20th century, mostly from the coastal region of Slovenia and the areas of Gorizia and Trieste, which became part of Italy after World War I. The first wave of Slovene immigrants settled mainly in Buenos Aires, Rosario, Córdoba, and Paraná, while the second wave, which arrived after World War II, consisted of immigrants escaping from communist persecution in Slovenia. Many of these immigrants settled in the Buenos Aires neighborhood of Floresta and the city of Berisso. Slovene Argentines have maintained strong ties with their cultural heritage, and there are several organizations that promote Slovene language, culture, and traditions. The Slovenian House in Buenos Aires (Slovenska hiša) serves as the center of the Slovenian community in Argentina, hosting various events and activities throughout the year, such as dance and music performances, art exhibits, and food festivals. The Slovenian-Argentine Society, founded in 1957, is dedicated to preserving and promoting Slovenian culture and identity in Argentina, organizing cultural and social events, and providing language classes for children and adults. In addition, the Slovenian-Argentine Association of Entre Rios province, established in 1993, is another organization that supports the Slovenian community in the region. Despite being a relatively small community, Slovene Argentines have managed to preserve their cultural heritage and continue to celebrate their identity through various activities and initiatives.

=== Brazil ===
Around 6,000 Slovenes and their descendants live in Brazil, with the first Slovene immigrants arriving in the 1870s and the largest wave of immigration occurring between 1910 and 1920. The majority of Slovene immigrants settled in Paraná state, particularly in the cities of Curitiba and Rio Negro, as well as in São Paulo and Rio Grande do Sul. In São Paulo, Slovenes established a Slovene cultural center called "Centro Cultural Esloveno" in 1954, which features a library with books in Slovene and Portuguese, a museum, and a restaurant that serves Slovenian cuisine. In Curitiba, the Slovenian Cultural Association was founded in 1953 and includes a choir, a folk dance group, and a youth group that promotes Slovene culture among young people. Other cultural organizations that exist within the Slovene-Brazilian community include the Slovenian Cultural Association in Paraná, founded in 1934, and the Slovene-Brazilian Cultural Association, founded in 1985, which organizes cultural events such as the annual "Slovenian Festival" in Curitiba, which attracts thousands of visitors. The Slovene-Brazilian community celebrates Slovene holidays and maintains a strong cultural presence in Brazil, with organizations like the Slovene-Brazilian Cultural Association promoting Slovene language and culture through classes, festivals, and cultural events. It's worth noting that while many Slovenes in Brazil have assimilated into Brazilian society, they still preserve their cultural heritage.

=== Chile ===
Chile has a small but diverse community of Slovenian origin, with an estimated 300 Slovenians living in the country. The migration was initially driven by economic reasons before and after the Second World War, with most of the immigrants coming from the Primorska region of Slovenia. The first Slovenian immigrants arrived in Chile in the early 20th century, with many settling in the city of Punta Arenas, where they established a Slovenian cultural center and a Slovenian school. Today, the community includes individuals from Slovenia and Argentina who move to Chile for business or family reasons. The older immigrants have largely assimilated into Chilean society, and there was no organized community until the establishment of the Slovenian Association in Chile in 2009. However, newer immigrants are forming mixed families. The Slovenian community in Chile celebrates Slovenian holidays and hosts cultural events to promote and preserve their heritage. The Slovenian Association in Chile, founded in the capital city of Santiago, provides a platform for Slovenians to connect and celebrate their culture and heritage.

=== Colombia ===
It is estimated that there are around 150 Slovenes and their descendants living in Colombia. While approximately ten of them reside in Bogotá, the majority live in cities along the Atlantic coast such as Cartagena, Barranquilla, and Santa Marta, as well as larger Colombian cities such as Medellín and Cali. In 2018, the Slovenian Association of Colombia (Slovensko društvo v Kolumbiji) was founded to promote cultural exchange and community building among Slovenes and their descendants in Colombia.

=== Uruguay ===
Uruguay has a notable community of Slovenian origin, with an estimated 2,000 Slovenes and their descendants residing in the country. The first Slovenian immigrants arrived in Uruguay in the late 19th century, with the majority arriving between the two world wars. They were mostly from the Prekmurje region and partly from the Primorska region. The community is centered around Montevideo, where the oldest functioning Slovenian society in South America, the First Slovenian Prekmurje Society, was established in 1935. In addition to the Prekmurje Society, two other Slovenian societies, Ivan Cankar and Slavček, also existed, and these three societies merged in 1937 to form the Slovenian Circle. Today, the Slovenian Circle has around 130 members and facilities including a large and small hall, a bowling alley, an outdoor playground, a meeting room, and one apartment. The community hosts events and celebrations, which are attended by between 100 and 300 people, with the largest attendance being at the "koline" feast.

=== Venezuela ===
Venezuela has a small Slovene community, with up to 650 Slovenes and their descendants living in the country. The majority of them reside in Caracas, where the community has a number of cultural organizations, including the Slovene-Venezuelan Cultural Association, established in 1965. The first Slovene immigrants arrived in Venezuela in the early 20th century, and many settled in the city of Maracaibo. The Slovenian Association of Maracaibo, founded in 1938, also maintains a presence in Venezuela. The Slovene-Venezuelan Cultural Association promotes cultural exchanges between Slovenia and Venezuela, and organizes events such as film screenings, lectures, and music concerts. Even after the death of the priest Janez Grilc, who initially brought together the Slovene community, they continue to occasionally gather with more than a hundred people of Slovenian origin attending. In addition, a Slovenian society was established in Valencia, the second-largest city in the north of the country, primarily through Facebook connections in 2017/18.
