= Ivan Zorman =

Slovene poet and composer

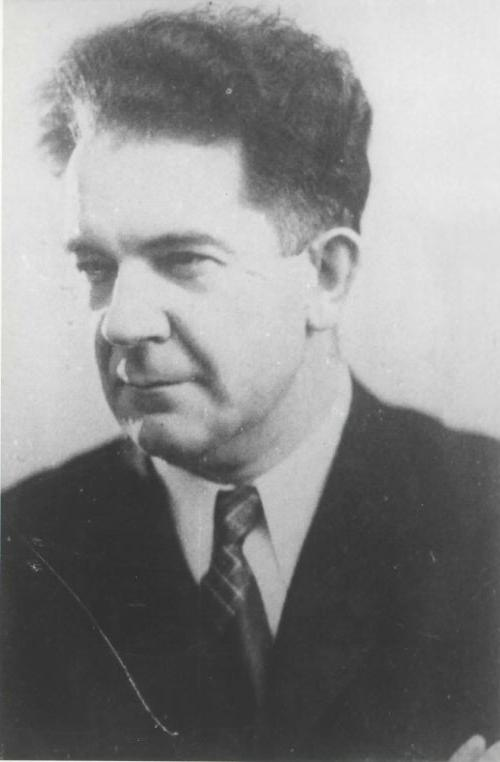
Ivan Zorman

Ivan Zorman (April 28, 1889 – August 4, 1957) was a Slovene poet and composer.

Zorman was born in Šmarje, Slovenia (then part of Austria-Hungary). Zorman's family emigrated from Austria-Hungary to the United States when he was four years old. After returning to Slovenia for one year, when he was ten years old, Zorman immersed himself in the study of Slovene and culture. He graduated from Western Reserve University with degrees in language, literature and music. He went on to teach organ, piano, and voice for Slovene societies while serving as an organist at St. Lawrence Catholic Church.

While Zorman's poetry became successful in the United States, it went largely unnoticed in his homeland of Yugoslavia. However, in 1933, his poems became more popular and he was acknowledged as a legitimate writer in Slovene. "In 1938, his 5th book of poetry, From the New World, received honorable mention in the Jugoslav University Club at the Hollenden Hotel. Zorman eventually wrote 6 volumes of poetry and translated many others."

Zorman contributed to the Cleveland Cultural Gardens project through his translation of the Yugoslav Cultural Garden (now the Slovenian Cultural Garden) piece found in the book, Their Paths Are Peace by Clara Lederer. In 1959, Zorman's daughter, Carmen, dedicated a memorial bust to her father in Gardens.

Zorman died of throat cancer in Cleveland, Ohio in 1957.
