= Slovene Canadians =

Kanadski Slovenci
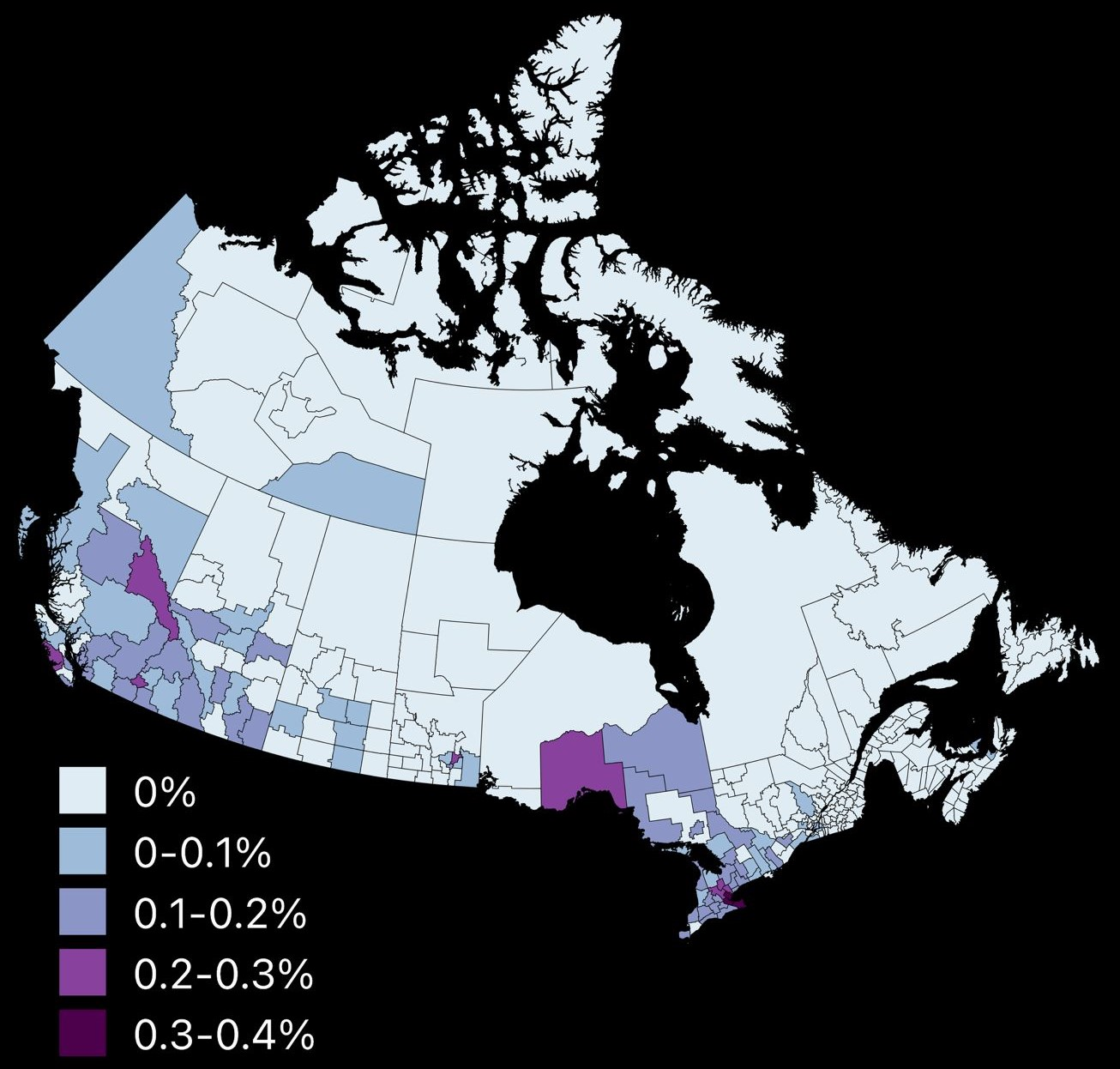
- Population distribution of Slovene Canadians by census division, 2021 census

Total population
- 40,470

Languages
- Canadian English • Canadian French • Slovene

Religion
- Catholicism • Protestantism

Related ethnic groups
- Slovene Americans, Yugoslav Canadians

Slovene Canadians (Slovene: Kanadski Slovenci, literally 'Canadian Slovenes') are Canadian citizens of Slovene descent or Slovenian - born people who reside in Canada.

The first Slovenes came to Canada in the early 1900s. The second generation of Slovenes came as refugees after the second world war. The third generation of Slovenes came in the 1960s for economic reasons. Currently, Slovenes continue to visit Canada and some continue to emigrate. Most of the emigration moves to Ontario where the community is largest.

According to the Canadian population census from 1991, 8,050 persons defined themselves as Slovenes by descent. In 2006, this number increased to 35,935 persons. According to unofficial data, between 40,000 and 50,000 Slovenes live in Canada.

The Slovene community in Canada is active and well organized. It is a diverse community, but fairly united in the work to preserve national identity, cultural tradition and language. There are a number of Slovene Associations and Groups across Canada. There are three Slovene churches in Toronto, Hamilton and Montreal.

== Geographical distribution ==
Provinces and territories	Combined responses
Ontario	26,485
Quebec	2,510
Nova Scotia	150
New Brunswick	130
Manitoba	1,005
British Columbia	5,555
Prince Edward Island	30
Saskatchewan	640
Alberta	3,885
Newfoundland and Labrador	15
Northwest Territories	20
Yukon	45
Nunavut	0
Canada	40,470

== Religion ==
Slovenian Canadian demography by religion
Religious group	2021 (Note: Religious breakdown proportions based on "Slovenian" ethnic or cultural origin response on the 2021 census.)		2001 (Note: Religious breakdown proportions based on "Slovenian" ethnic or cultural origin response on the 2001 census.)	
Religious group	Pop.	%	Pop.	%
Christianity	26,585	68.88%	25,945	89.73%
Irreligion	11,580	30%	2,780	9.61%
Islam	80	0.21%	65	0.22%
Judaism	95	0.25%	50	0.17%
Buddhism	45	0.12%	25	0.09%
Hinduism	15	0.04%	10	0.03%
Indigenous spirituality	10	0.03%	10	0.03%
Sikhism	0	0%	0	0%
Other	190	0.49%	30	0.1%
Total Slovenian Canadian population	38,595	100%	28,915	100%

Slovenian Canadian demography by Christian sects
Religious group	2021		2001	
Religious group	Pop.	%	Pop.	%
Catholic	22,290	83.84%	22,520	86.8%
Orthodox	710	2.67%	555	2.14%
Protestant	2,045	7.69%	2,415	9.31%
Other Christian	1,540	5.79%	455	1.75%
Total Slovenian Canadian Christian population	26,585	100%	25,945	100%

== Notable Slovene Canadians ==
- Alojzij Ambrožič - Catholic priest
- Lolita Davidovich - actress
- Sabrina Grdevich - actress
- Bill Hajt - ice hockey player
- John Jakopin - ice hockey player
- Ed Kastelic - ice hockey player
- Greg Kuznik - ice hockey player
- Joe Mihevc - politician
- Walter Ostanek - accordion musician
- Kevin Pangos - basketball player
- Nic Petan - ice hockey player
- John Smrke - ice hockey player
- Stan Smrke - ice hockey player
- Steve Bozek - ice hockey player
- Tina Srebotnjak - television journalist
- Matt Stajan - ice hockey player
- Elvis Stojko - figure skater
- Walter Wolf - businessman
- Tanya Fir - politician
- Markus Cimermancic - soccer player
- Kaitlin Kozell - Influencer and singer

== See also ==
- Canada–Slovenia relations
- Slovene diaspora
- European Canadian
- Slovene Americans
- Slovene Argentines
