= Slovenian Women's Union of America =

Coordinates: 41°31′56″N 88°04′55″W

Slovenian Union and Heritage Museum
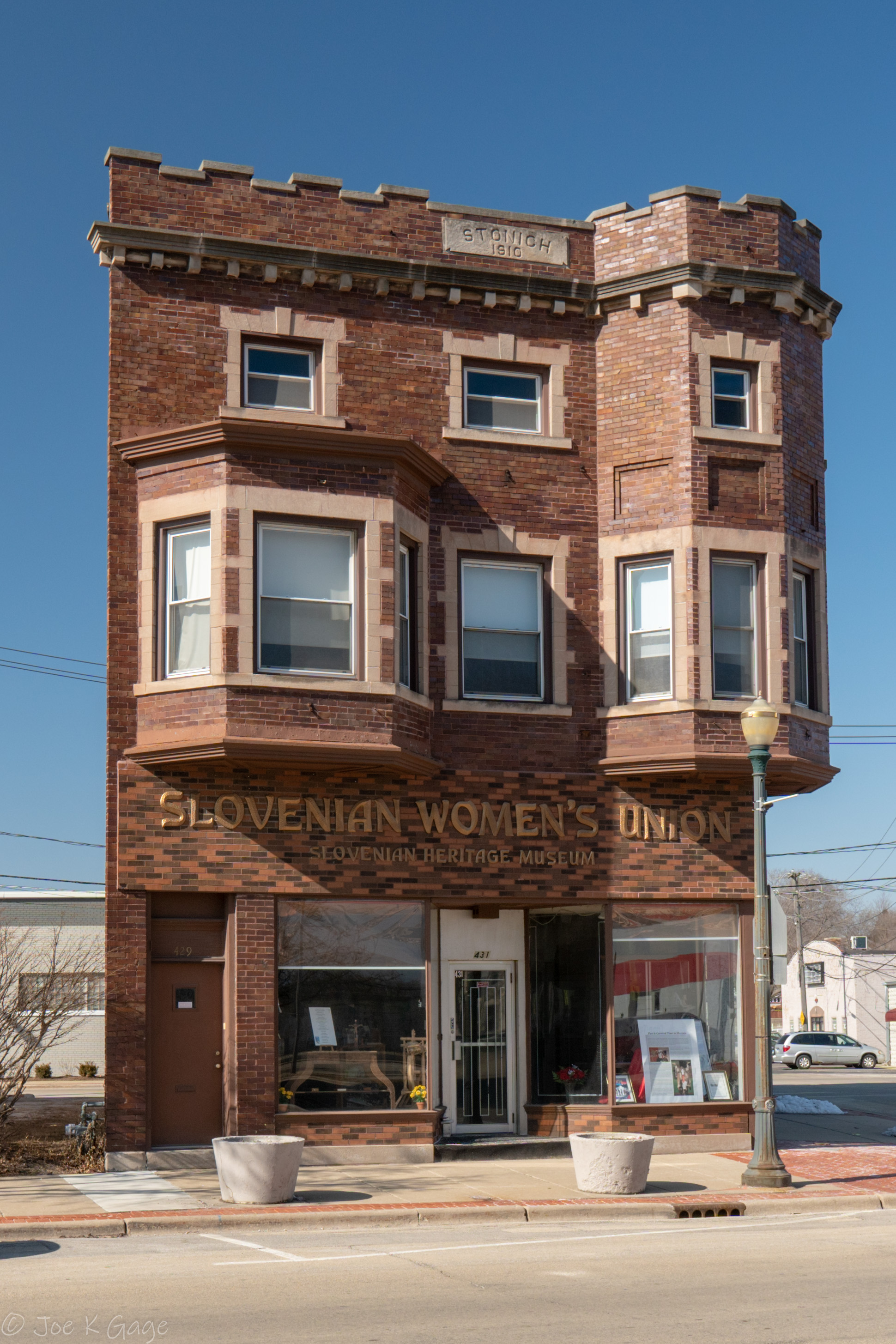
- Headquarters of SUA in Joliet, Illinois
- Established: 1926
- Location: 431 N Chicago St, Joliet, IL 60432
- Founder: Marie Prisland
- Website: slovenianunion.org/museum/

Slovenian Union of America (SUA) is an ethnic fraternal benefit and social organization for Slovene immigrants and their descendants in the United States. Founded in 1926 as Slovenska ženska zveza Amerike (Slovenian Women's Union of America), its original purpose was to advocate for the rights of Slovenian women in the United States. Currently the society preserves the traditions, language, and culture of their ancestors. The society is headquartered in Joliet, Illinois, and publishes a magazine called Zarja (The Dawn in English). The society is known as the Slovenian Union of America since 2011, when it became a nonprofit.

== History ==
Slovenian immigrant Marie Prisland founded the organization in 1926 to "meet the needs of Slovenian immigrant women in their new country".

Josephine Erjavec and Barbara Kramer founded Joliet Branch 20, which became the third of 12 total branches in the state. Branch 20 held its first meeting with 14 charter members on June 11, 1928, at Mary Russ’ home at 1020 N. Broadway Street. Branch 20 became one of the SUA's largest branches, recording 292 members in 1928.

== Museum ==
The Slovenian Heritage Museum, located at the Joliet headquarters of the SUA, was founded in 1978 by Irene M. Odorizzi and dedicated in 1983. Members of Joliet Branch #20 contributed to the museum. The museum celebrated its 40th anniversary in 2023.

The building was previously owned by prominent Joliet businessman George Stonich.

The museum features artifacts from Slovenia, including memorabilia, keepsakes, photos, and rare books. It features over 1,000 books in its library, mostly in Slovenian but also including other Slavic languages like Serbian and Croatian. The museum preserves union membership records, union archives, and copies of Zarja since 1929. It also contains a collection of artifacts from the union's founder, Marie Prisland, including an art deco curio cabinet, Prisland's stitchery and handiwork, and an oil portrait of the founder from 1976. Resources for genealogical research and a gift shop are also part of the museum.

== See also ==
- Slovenian Americans
