= Slovene Argentines =

Esloveno Argentino (Spanish) Argentinski Slovenci (Slovene)
- (Argentina) (Slovenia)
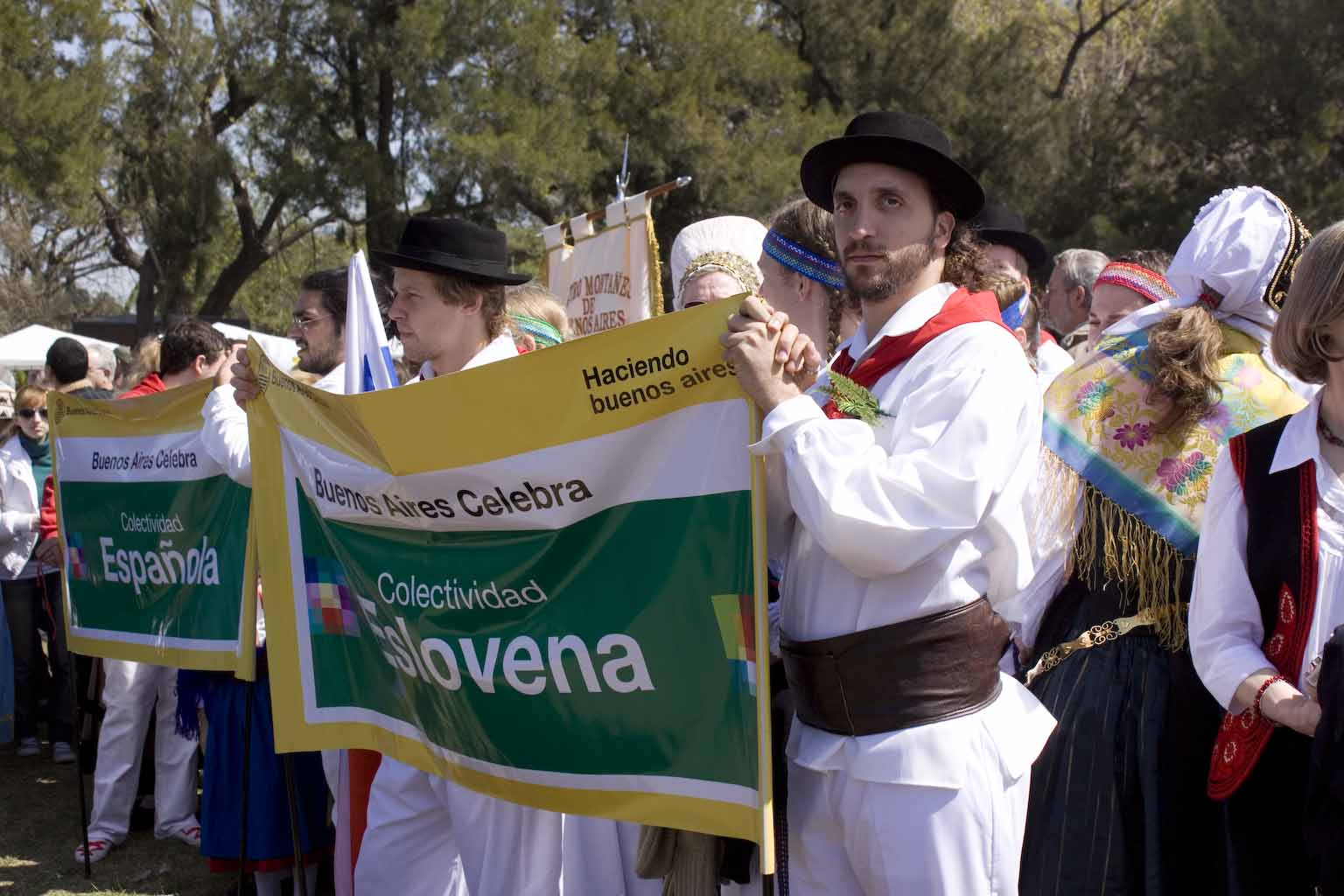
- Slovenian community in Buenos Aires on Immigrant Day 2011

Total population
- 30,000 (by ancestry)

Regions with significant populations
- Buenos Aires, San Carlos de Bariloche, Mendoza, Paraná, Córdoba

Languages
- Slovene, Spanish

Religion
- Catholic with a Lutheran minority

Related ethnic groups
- Slovenes: Slovene Americans; Slovene Canadians

Argentines of Slovene descent, also Slovene Argentines (Slovene: Argentinski Slovenci) are Argentines who have predominantly or total Slovene ancestry. According to Jernej Zupančič of the Slovenian Academy of Sciences and Arts, they number around 30,000.

== Notable people ==
- Andrés Kogovsek, handball player
- Cristian Poglajen, volleyball player
- Alojz Geržinič, composer
- Andrej Bajuk, banker and politician
- Anton Novačan, author, politician and diplomat
- Bernarda Fink, opera singer
- Emilio Komar, philosopher
- Franc Rode, Cardinal of the Roman Catholic Church
- Ivan Ahčin, journalist, sociologist and politician
- Juan Vasle, singer and journalist
- Lucas Mario Horvat, football player
- Marcos Fink, singer
- Pedro Opeka, missionary
- Tine Debeljak, literary historian and essayist
- Viktor Sulčič, architect
- Luciano Pocrnjic, football player
- Andrés Vombergar, football player
- Vicente Bokalic Iglic, cardinal

== See also ==
- Argentina–Slovenia relations
- Argentines of European descent
- Croatian Argentines
- Macedonian Argentine
- Montenegrin Argentines
- Serbian Argentines
- Ethnic groups of Argentina
- Slovenian diaspora
