= American Slovenian Catholic Union =

Slovene fraternal organization in the US

KSKJ, or Kranjsko slovenska katoliška jednota ("Carniolan Slovene Catholic Union"), is a Slovene fraternal organization in the United States, founded in 1894. It is headquartered in Joliet, Illinois. The English name of the society is the American Slovenian Catholic Union. Membership is open to all Catholic Slovenes. In 1979 it had 42,000 members in 130 lodges in 19 states.

Among the group's activities, it sponsors award and recognition dinners, annual regional and state outdoor activities, contests for children, picnics and Christmas parties. The society also awards scholarships for college and technical schools. Charities of various kinds have been supported by local lodges and the national organization.

The society publishes a newspaper, KSKJ Voice.

== See also ==
- Slovenian Americans
- Slovene National Benefit Society
