= Progressive Slovene Women of America =

- Abbreviation: PSWA
- Formation: 1934
- Type: Fraternal organization
- Headquarters: Cleveland, Ohio
- Website: https://www.angelfire.com/oh4/slovenian/PSWACircleDirectory.html

Progressive Slovene Women of America (PSWA), or Progresivne Slovenke Amerike, is an ethnic fraternal benefit and social organization for Slovene immigrant women and their descendants in the United States. Founded in 1934, it is headquartered in Cleveland, Ohio and incorporate in 1938. The organization formally disbanded in 2004.

== See also ==
- Slovenian Americans
