= Slovene National Benefit Society =

American fraternal society for Slovenian immigrants to the USA

- Slovenska narodna podporna jednota
- Established: April 6, 1904; 122 years ago
- Founded at: Chicago, Illinois, United States
- Type: Mutual aid society
- Region served: United States
- Website: snpj.org

The Slovene National Benefit Society (SNPJ; Slovene: Slovenska narodna podporna jednota), is an American fraternal benefit and social organization for Slovene immigrants and their descendants in the United States.

Founded in 1904, it is headquartered in suburban Pittsburgh, Pennsylvania, USA, near Imperial-Enlow. SNPJ publishes a regular newspaper called Prosveta. It is classified under 501(c)(8) Fraternal Beneficiary Societies; in 2024 it claimed $14,830,276 in total revenue and total assets of $125,583,671.

The Society was founded on a "freethought" basis. This was because many of the founders felt that existing Slovene organizations were too closely tied to the church.

== History ==
The SNPJ was formed in Chicago, Illinois, on April 6, 1904, and held its first convention on April 9. The society was organized by a call in a Slovenian-language newspaper for a new Slovenian benefit society. The founding twelve delegates represented nine independent Slovene groups with a total membership of 276. The organization was incorporated on June 17, 1907. The incorporation was delayed over a year because of an Illinois law which required fraternal benefit groups to have at least 500 members.

By 1905, membership had grown to over 1,500 in 27 lodges. By 1907, there were almost 4,300 members in 60 lodges. In 1917, the SNPJ, with 16,700 members in 360 lodges, had become the largest Slovene fraternal benefit society in the United States.

In 1921, the SNPJ merged with the Slovene Workmen's Benefit Society, or SDPZ (previously absorbed the St. Barbara Lodge and the Slovene Labor Benefit and Pension Union). This merger gave the SNPJ over 36,000 members in 374 lodges. In 1941, the Slovenian Progressive Benefit Society (SSPZ) merged with the SNPJ. The Lily Alliance merged with SNPJ in 1947.

The first English-speaking lodge, Pioneer Lodge 559 of Chicago, was chartered in 1925.

By the late 1960s, the Society had 68,000 members. In 1979, it had 56,000 members in 350 lodges in twenty states.

In 1961, all Canadian members were consolidated into a single lodge; in 1971, this lodge was transferred to the Croatian Fraternal Union. In 1969, the Slovene Independent Benefit Society merged with SNPJ.

The high point of individual memberships appears to have been in 1950, when SNPJ had 71,554 members. The high point of lodge membership appears to have been in 1946, when SNPJ comprised 614 active lodges.

In 1995, the SNPJ had 47,764 members.

In 2001, the Workingmen's Beneficial Society of Pittsburgh merged with SNPJ.

As of 2002, there were 42,299 members in 170 lodges.

== Organization ==
The local chapters of the Society are called "Lodges" and the supreme authority is the "National Legislative Body", which meets quadrennially. Between conventions, the Society is run by a "National Board." In 1979, it was headquartered in Burr Ridge, Illinois, but now appears to have its central office in Imperial, Pennsylvania. The Lodges appear to be organized into numbered regions and local federations.

== Benefits ==
Initially, the Society offered a death benefit of $500 to males, with a $1 flat rate assessment. However, by the 1970s, the Society was a legal reserve fund insurance group. The Society sponsors scholarships and operates a recreation center for its members, among other activities.

== Ritual ==
The Society has a ritual, but it is not secret. The ritual included initiation rites, installation ceremonies for officers, an organizational pledge and burial rites. A prospective member must promise to be faithful to the Society's constitution, defend the reputation of the lodges, and bring no harm to the organization.

== See also ==
- S.N.P.J., Pennsylvania
- KSKJ
- Slovenian Americans
