= Zarja Singing Society =

Choral group based in Cleveland, Ohio

The Zarja Singing Society is a choral group based in Cleveland, Ohio. It is dedicated to the education and support of Slovenian culture and tradition.

The group was founded in 1916, making it the oldest Slovenian singing group abroad and the oldest secular Slovenian singing society in Cleveland.

== Early history ==
The Zarja Singing Society was founded in Cleveland in 1916, by Cleveland members of the Jugoslav Socialist Federation of Chicago. Its inaugural members were a group of seventeen Slovenian singers, mostly immigrants. Under its first director John Gombač, membership to the group was originally restricted to men. It became open to women after John Ivanusch became its third director in 1920. That year, the group was composed of twenty-two female and twenty-seven male singers.

Initially, the group performed either a cappella or with a piano accompaniment, but were able enough to perform an operetta with orchestra accompaniment by 1926. They staged their first full-length opera, Turjaška Rozamunda, in 1928 and staged the debut performance of Ulrich, Count of Celje in the United States a year later. By 1930, membership had grown to forty-five members and the group had performed its rendition of The Nightingale of Gorenjska at downtown Cleveland's Public Hall. Under the direction of Joseph Krabec, from 1933, they performed in concerts, operas, and musical plays in Slovene and English. They also toured and held concerts with local choral groups like Jadran, Sloga, and Slovan. Their concerts benefited local organizations including the Slovene Home of the Aged and the monthly magazine Cankarjev Glasnik, as well as relief efforts based in Slovenia.

In 1930, Samostojna Zarja (Independent Zarja) formed as an independent group after splitting from Zarja. It was first led by Ivanusch for nine years, and later changed its name to Glasbena Matica ("The Music Society") in 1940.

== Move to Euclid ==
In 1962, Zarja moved its meeting place from the Slovenian National Home to the Slovenian Society Home in Euclid. The group was invited to perform in Slovenia on six occasions between their fiftieth anniversary in 1966 until 1987. They were given the 1972 Gallus Award by the government-sponsored Association of Cultural Organizations of Slovenia for upholding Slovenian musical and cultural traditions in the United States.

In 1976, the group deposited memoirs, music, and notes in the Library of Congress to celebrate Slovenian contributions to the United States on the occasion of the United States Bicentennial. They also recorded collections of Slovenian wedding and harvest customs under a grant received from the Ohio Arts Council in 1984.

== Leadership ==
The current musical director of the Zarja Singing Society is Doug Elersich, who has served in the position since 1986. The past directors are John Gombač (1916–1917), Popla Malen (1917–1919), John Ivanush (1919–1931), Joseph Krabec (1931–1960), Josephine Turkman (1960–1980), and Richard Tomsic (1981–1986).
