= Slovenes =

South Slavic ethnic group

Slovenes Slovenci
- Slovene diaspora

Total population
- c. 2.5 million

Regions with significant populations
- Slovenia c. 1,749,000
- United States: 175,099–300,000
- Italy: 80,000
- Germany: 50,000
- Austria: 50,000
- Canada: 40,470–50,000
- Argentina: 30,000
- Brazil: 28,500 (est.)
- Australia: 20,000–25,000
- France: 20,000
- Switzerland: 14,000
- Croatia: 10,517 (2011)
- Serbia: 2,829
- Sweden: 3,300–7,000
- United Kingdom: 5,000
- Bosnia and Herzegovina: 5,000
- Hungary: 2,812–5,000
- Belgium: 4,000
- Uruguay: 2,000
- Spain: 1,213–2000
- Russia: 1,700 (est.)
- North Macedonia: 1,247
- Netherlands: 1,000
- Luxembourg: 700
- New Zealand: 500
- Montenegro: 354
- Czech Republic: 350
- Venezuela: 346
- Norway: 330
- Chile: 300
- South Africa: 120–300
- Portugal: 290
- Ireland: 250
- Poland: 250
- Japan: 217
- Finland: 196
- China: 147
- Singapore: 65–120
- Egypt: 96
- Jordan: 70
- Taiwan: 16

Languages
- Slovene (Note: Also referred to as Slovenian)

Religion
- Christianity: Predominantly Roman Catholic, Lutheran minority

Related ethnic groups
- Other South Slavs; Especially Kajkavian Croats, Resians

Slovenes, also known as Slovenians (Slovene: Slovenci [slɔˈʋéːntsi]), are a South Slavic ethnic group native to Slovenia and adjacent regions in Italy, Austria and Hungary. Slovenes share a common ancestry, culture, and history, and speak Slovene as their native language.

Outside of Slovenia and Europe, Slovenes form diaspora groups in the United States, Canada, Argentina and Australia.

== Population ==
=== Population in Slovenia ===
Most Slovenes live within the borders of independent Slovenia (2,100,000 inhabitants, 83% Slovenes, estimate July 2020). In the Slovenian national census of 2002, 1,631,363 people ethnically declared themselves as Slovenes, while 1,723,434 people claimed Slovene as their native language.

=== Population abroad ===
The autochthonous Slovene minority in Italy is estimated at 83,000 to 100,000, the Slovene minority in southern Austria at 24,855, in Croatia at 13,200, and in Hungary at 3,180. Significant Slovene expatriate communities live in the United States and Canada, in other European countries, in South America (mostly in Argentina and Brazil), and in Australia and New Zealand. The largest population of Slovenes outside of Slovenia is in Cleveland, Ohio, USA.

== Genetics ==
In a 2013 Y-DNA study, 29-32% of 399–458 sampled Slovenian males belong to Y-DNA Haplogroup R1a, more frequent than in South Slavic peoples. The second largest Haplogroup was Haplogroup R1b, at 26-28%, following was the Haplogroup I, with 30-31%. Due to the geographic position of Slovenia, the population is substantially diverse, sharing genes with Italic peoples, Germanic, Slavs and Hungarians. The Slovenian population displays close genetic affiliations with West Slavic, South Slavic, Austrians and Italic populations. The homogenous genetic strata of the West Slavic populations and the Slovenian population suggest the existence of a common ancestral population in the central European region. The R-Z92 branch of R-Z280 which is significant among East Slavs is recorded as completely absent among Slovenes. In 2016 study, including 100 sampled Slovenians, 27.1% belong to R1b, of which 11.03% of R1b belongs to the R-P312 branch, 6% to the eastern and 4% to R-U106. A 2018 autosomal study found that Slovenes clustered with Croatians and Hungarians in PCA, and were close to Czechs. A separate analysis grouped them with Hungarians, Czechs and some Croatians. The authors concluded that Slovenes showed a strong genetic affinity with Central-Eastern European populations, particularly Czechs and Hungarians, and were more closely related to Northern-Central than Western-Southern European populations.

Although Slovenes are linguistically classified as South Slavs, genetic studies indicate that, by certain markers, they share closer genetic affinities with West Slavic populations than with other South Slavs such as Bulgarians and Macedonians.

== History ==
=== Early Alpine Slavs ===
In the 6th century AD, Slavic people settled the region between the Alps and the Adriatic Sea in two consecutive migration waves: the first wave came from the Moravian lands around 550, while the second wave, coming from the southeast, moved into the area after the migration of the Lombards to Italy in 568.

From 623 to 658 Slavic peoples between the upper Elbe River and the Karawanks mountain range united under the leadership of King Samo (Slovene: Kralj Sámo) in what became known as "Samo's Tribal Union". The tribal union collapsed after Samo's death in 658, but a smaller Slavic tribal principality, Carantania (Slovene: Karantanija), remained, with its centre in the present-day region of Carinthia.

=== Alpine Slavs during the Frankish Empire ===
Faced with the pressing danger of Avar tribes from the east, the Carantanians accepted a union with Bavaria in 745, and later in the 8th century recognized Frankish rule and accepted Christianity. The last Slavic state formation in the region, the principality of Prince Kocel, lost its independence in 874. Slovene ethnic territory subsequently shrank due to pressure from Germans from the west and the arrival of Hungarians in the Pannonian plain; it stabilized in its present form in the 15th century.

=== 16th century: Slovene Protestant reformation and consolidation of Slovene ===
The first mentions of a common Slovene ethnic identity, transcending regional boundaries, date from the 16th century. During this period, the first books in Slovene were written by the Protestant preacher Primož Trubar and his followers, establishing the base for the development of standard Slovene. In the second half of the 16th century, numerous books were printed in Slovene, including an integral translation of the Bible by Jurij Dalmatin.

At the beginning of the 17th century, Protestantism was suppressed by the Habsburg-sponsored Counter Reformation, which introduced the new aesthetics of Baroque culture.

=== 18th century: Slovenes under Maria Theresa and Joseph II ===
The Enlightenment in the Habsburg monarchy brought significant social and cultural progress to the Slovene people. It hastened economic development and facilitated the appearance of a middle class. Under the reign of Maria Theresa and Emperor Joseph II (1765–1790) many reforms were undertaken in the administration and society, including land reforms, the modernization of the Church and compulsory primary education in Slovene (1774). The start of cultural-linguistic activities by Slovene intellectuals of the time brought about a national revival and the birth of the Slovene nation in the modern sense of the word. Before the Napoleonic Wars, some secular literature in Slovene emerged. During the same period, the first history of the Slovene Lands as an ethnic unity was written by Anton Tomaž Linhart, while Jernej Kopitar compiled the first comprehensive grammar of Slovene.

=== Slovenes under Napoleon (1809–1813) ===
Between 1809 and 1813, Slovenia was part of the Illyrian Provinces, an autonomous province of the Napoleonic French Empire, with Ljubljana as the capital. Although the French rule was short-lived, it significantly contributed to the rise of national consciousness and political awareness of Slovenes. After the fall of Napoleon, all Slovene Lands were once again included in the Austrian Empire. Gradually, a distinct Slovene national consciousness developed, and the quest for a political unification of all Slovenes became widespread. In the 1820s and 1840s, the interest in Slovene language and folklore grew enormously, with numerous philologists advancing the first steps towards standardization of the language. Illyrian movement, Pan-Slavic and Austro-Slavic ideas gained importance. However, the intellectual circle around the philologist Matija Čop and the Romantic poet France Prešeren was influential in affirming the idea of Slovene linguistic and cultural individuality, refusing the idea of merging Slovenes into a wider Slavic nation.

=== 1840s: the first Slovene national political programme ===
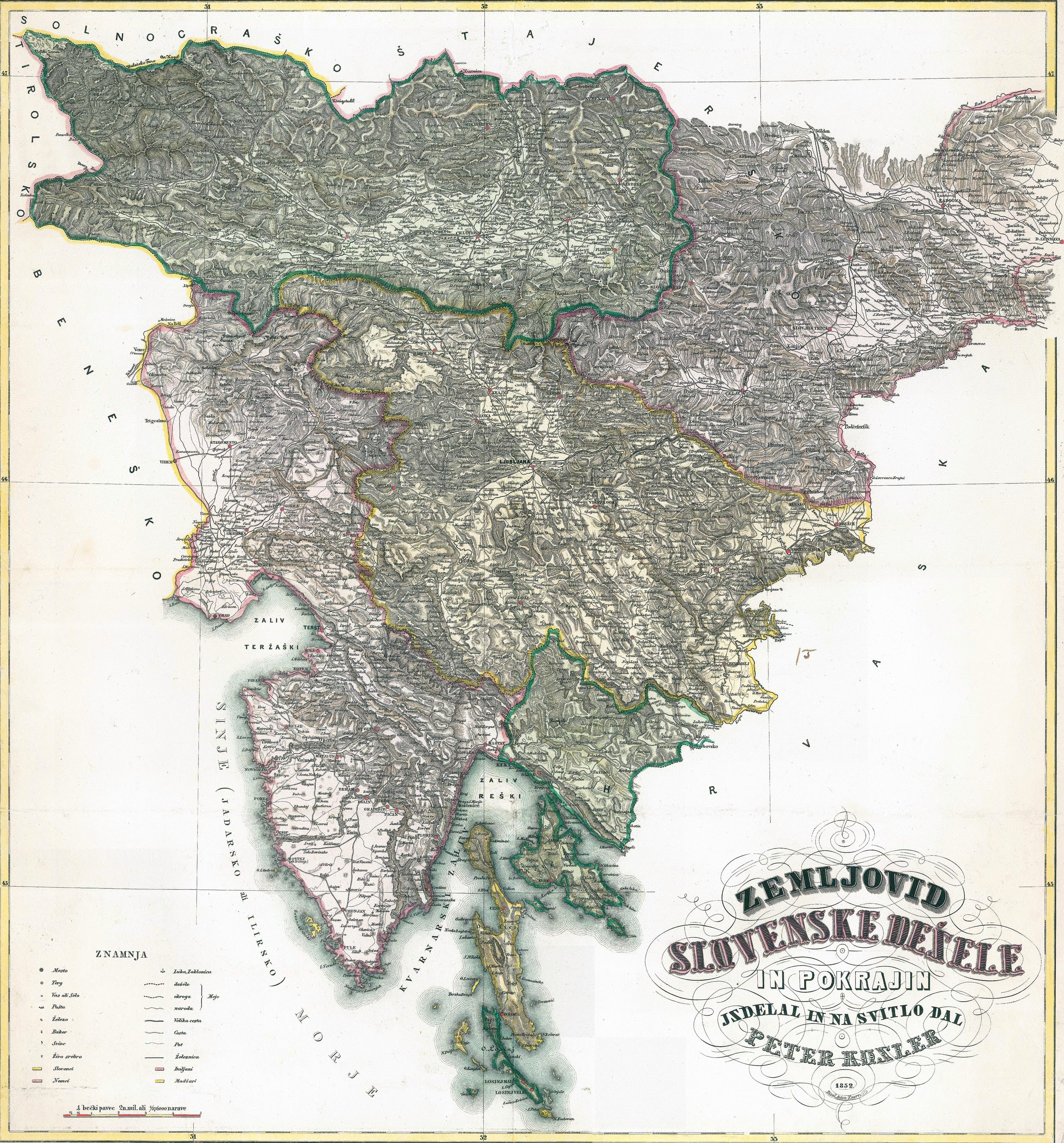
Peter Kosler's map of the Slovene Land, designed during the Spring of Nations in 1848, became the symbol of the quest for a United Slovenia.

In the 1840s, the Slovene national movement developed far beyond literary expression. In 1848, the first Slovene national political programme, called United Slovenia (Zedinjena Slovenija), was written in the context of the Spring of Nations movement within the Austrian Empire. It demanded a unification of all Slovene-speaking territories in an autonomous kingdom, named Slovenija, within the empire and an official status for Slovene. Although the project failed, it served as an important platform of Slovene political activity in the following decades, particularly in the 1860s and 1870s, when mass Slovene rallies, named tabori, were organised. The conflict between Slovene and German nationalists deepened. In 1866, some Slovenes were left to Italy, and in 1867 some remained in the Hungarian part of the Austria-Hungary. This significantly affected the nation and led to further radicalisation of the Slovene national movement. In the 1890s, the first Slovene political parties were established. All of them were loyal to Austria, but they were also espousing a common South Slavic cause.

=== Emigration ===
Between 1880 and World War I, the largest numbers of Slovenes emigrated to America. Most of these went between 1905 and 1913, although the exact number is impossible to determine because Slovenes were often classified as Austrians, Italians, Croats, or under other, broader labels, such as Slavonic or Slavic. Those who settled in Bethlehem, Pennsylvania came to be called Windish, from the Austrian German term Windisch 'Wend'.

The largest group of Slovenes in the United States eventually settled in Cleveland, Ohio, and the surrounding area. The second-largest group settled in Chicago, principally on the Lower West Side. The American Slovenian Catholic Union (Ameriško slovenska katoliška enota) was founded as an organization to protect Slovene-American rights in Joliet, Illinois, 64 km (40 mi) southwest of Chicago, and in Cleveland. Today there are KSKJ branches all over the country offering life insurance and other services to Slovene-Americans. Freethinkers were centered around 18th and Racine Ave. in Chicago, where they founded the Slovene National Benefit Society; other Slovene immigrants went to southwestern Pennsylvania, southeastern Ohio and the state of West Virginia to work in the coal mines and lumber industry. Some Slovenes also went to the Pittsburgh or Youngstown, Ohio, areas, to work in the steel mills, as well as Minnesota's Iron Range, to work in the iron mines and also to Copper Country on the Keweenaw Peninsula of Michigan for copper mining. Many also went west to Rock Springs in Wyoming to work in the coal mines that supported the Union Pacific Railway.

=== World War I ===
There were more than 30,000 casualties among ethnic Slovenes during World War I because they were and still are inhabiting the territory where the Isonzo Front was fought. While the majority of them were drafted in the Austro-Hungarian Army, also Slovene civil inhabitants from the Gorizia and Gradisca region suffered in hundreds of thousands because they were resettled in refugee camps where, however, Slovene refugees were treated as state enemies by Italians and several thousands died of malnutrition in Italian refugee camps.

=== Fascist Italianization of Littoral Slovenes ===
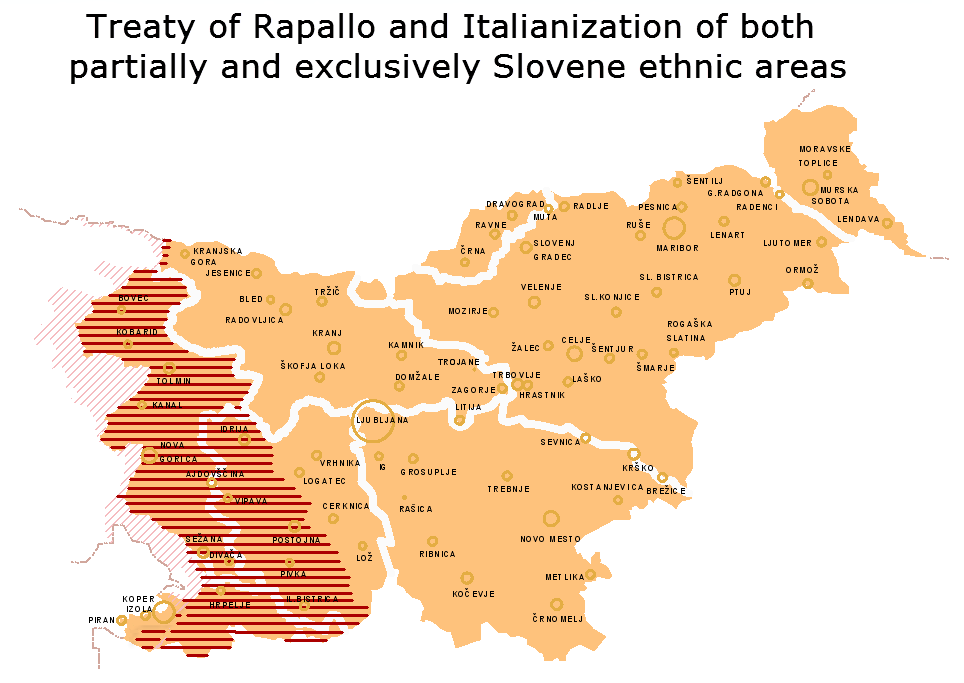

The annexed western quarter of Slovene speaking territory, and approximately 327,000 out of the total population of 1.3 million Slovenes, were subjected to forced Fascist Italianization. On the map of present-day Slovenia with its traditional regions' boundaries.

After the First World War (1914–1918), the majority of Slovenes joined other South Slavs in the State of Slovenes, Croats and Serbs, followed by the Kingdom of Serbs, Croats and Slovenes, and finally the Kingdom of Yugoslavia. In the new system of banovinas (since 1929), Slovenes formed a majority in the Drava Banovina.

In the ex-Austrian Empire area given to Italy in exchange for joining Great Britain in World War I, the forced Fascist Italianization of the Slovene minority in Italy (1920–1947) was under no international restraint especially after Benito Mussolini came to power in 1922. Already during the period of Italian occupation, between the years 1918 and 1920, all Slovene cultural associations (Sokol, "reading rooms" etc.) had been forbidden. Fascist Italy brought Italian teachers from southern Italy to Italianize ethnic Slovene and Croatian children, while the Slovene and Croatian teachers, poets, writers, artists and clergy were exiled to Sardinia and elsewhere to southern Italy. In 1926, claiming that it was restoring surnames to their original Italian form, the Italian government announced the Italianization of names and surnames not only of citizens of the Slovene minority, but also of Croatian and German. Some Slovenes willingly accepted Italianization in order to lose the status of being second-class citizens with no upward social mobility. By the mid-1930s, around 70,000 Slovenes had fled the region, mostly to Yugoslavia and South America.

In the bilingual regions people of Carinthia decided in a 1920 referendum that most of Carinthia should remain in Austria.

Slovene volunteers also participated in the Spanish Civil War and the Second Italo-Abyssinian War.

=== World War II and aftermath ===
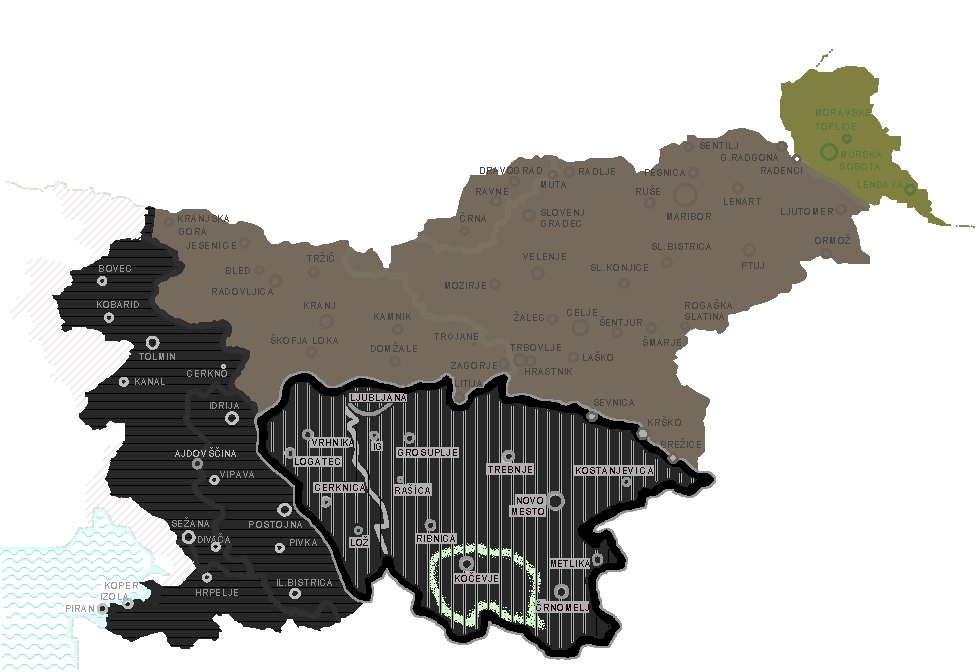

During WWII, Nazi Germany and Hungary occupied northern areas (brown and dark green areas, respectively), while Fascist Italy occupied the vertically hashed black area, including Gottschee area (solid black western part being annexed by Italy already with the Treaty of Rapallo). After 1943, Germany took over the Italian occupational area, as well.

During World War II, Slovenes were in a unique situation. While Greece shared its experience of being trisected, Slovenia was the only country that experienced a further step—absorption and annexation into neighboring Nazi Germany, Fascist Italy, and Hungary. After Yugoslavia was invaded by Axis powers on 6 April 1941, Germany and Hungary occupied northern Slovenia. Some villages in Lower Carniola were annexed by the Independent State of Croatia.

The Nazis started a policy of violent Germanisation. During the war, tens of thousands of Slovenes were resettled or chased away, imprisoned, or transported to labor, internment and extermination camps. Many were sent into exile to Nedić's Serbia and Croatia. The numbers of Slovenes drafted to the German military and paramilitary formations has been estimated at 150,000 men and women, almost a quarter of them died on various European battlefields, mostly on the Eastern Front.

Compared to the German policies in the northern Nazi-occupied area of Slovenia and the forced Fascist italianization in the former Austrian Littoral that was annexed after the First World War, the initial Italian policy in the central Slovenia was not as violent. Tens of thousands of Slovenes from German-occupied Lower Styria and Upper Carniola escaped to the Province of Ljubljana until June 1941.

However, after resistance started in Province of Ljubljana, Italian violence against the Slovene civil population easily matched that of the Germans. The province saw the deportation of 25,000 people—which equated to 7.5% of the total population of the province—in one of the most drastic operations in Europe that filled up many Italian concentration camps, such as Rab concentration camp, in Gonars concentration camp, Monigo (Treviso), Renicci d'Anghiari, Chiesanuova (Padua) and elsewhere. To suppress the mounting resistance by the Slovene Partisans, Mario Roatta adopted draconian measures of summary executions, hostage-taking, reprisals, internments, and the burning of houses and whole villages. The "3C" pamphlet, tantamount to a declaration of war on civilians, involved him in Italian war crimes.

In the summer of 1941, a resistance movement led by the Liberation Front of the Slovene Nation, emerged in both the Italian and in the German occupation zones. The resistance, pluralistic at the beginning, was gradually taken over by the Communist Party, as in the rest of occupied Yugoslavia. Contrary to elsewhere in Yugoslavia, where on the freed territories the political life was organized by the military itself, the Slovene Partisans were subordinated to the civil political authority of the Front.

In the summer of 1942, a civil war between Slovenes broke out. The two fighting factions were the Slovenian Partisans and the Italian-sponsored anti-communist militia, later re-organized under Nazi command as the Slovene Home Guard. Small units of Slovenian Chetniks also existed in Lower Carniola and Styria. The Partisans were under the command of the Liberation Front (OF) and Tito's Yugoslav resistance, while the Slovenian Covenant served as the political arm of the anti-Communist militia. The civil war was mostly restricted to the Province of Ljubljana, where more than 80% of the Slovene anti-partisan units were active. Between 1943 and 1945, smaller anti-Communist militia existed in parts of the Slovenian Littoral and in Upper Carniola, while they were virtually non-existent in the rest of the country. By 1945, the total number of Slovene anti-Communist militiamen reached 17,500.

Immediately after the war, some 12,000 members of the Slovene Home Guard were killed in the Kočevski Rog massacres, while thousands of anti-communist civilians were killed in the first year after the war. In addition, hundreds of ethnic Italians from the Julian March were killed by the Yugoslav Army and partisan forces in the Foibe massacres; some 27,000 Istrian Italians fled Slovenian Istria from Communist persecution in the so-called Istrian–Dalmatian exodus. Members of the ethnic German minority either fled or were expelled from Slovenia.

The overall number of World War II casualties in Slovenia is estimated at 97,000. The number includes about 14,000 people, who were killed or died for other war-related reasons immediately after the end of the war, and the tiny Jewish community, which was nearly annihilated in the Holocaust. In addition, tens of thousands of Slovenes left their homeland soon after the end of the war. Most of them settled in Brazil, Argentina, Canada, Australia, and the United States.

Most of Carinthia remained part of Austria and around 42,000 Slovenes (per 1951 population census) were recognized as a minority and have enjoyed special rights following the Austrian State Treaty (Staatsvertrag) of 1955. Slovenes in the Austrian state of Styria (4,250) are not recognized as a minority and do not enjoy special rights, although the State Treaty of 27 July 1955 states otherwise. Many Carinthians remain uneasy about Slovene territorial claims, pointing to the fact that Yugoslav troops entered the state after each of the two World Wars. The former governor, Jörg Haider, regularly played the Slovene card when his popularity started to dwindle, and indeed relied on the strong anti-Slovene attitudes in many parts of the province for his power base.

Yugoslavia acquired some territory from Italy after WWII but some 100,000 Slovenes remained behind the Italian border, notably around Trieste and Gorizia.

== Slovenes in Socialist Yugoslavia ==
Socialist Republic of Slovenia within the Socialist Federal Republic of Yugoslavia

Coat of arms of the Socialist Republic of Slovenia

Following the re-establishment of Yugoslavia at the end of World War II, Slovenia became part of the Socialist Federal Republic of Yugoslavia, declared on 29 November 1943. A socialist state was established, but because of the Tito–Stalin split, economic and personal freedoms were broader than in the Eastern Bloc. In 1947, Italy ceded most of the Julian March to Yugoslavia, and Slovenia thus regained the Slovene Littoral.

The dispute over the port of Trieste however remained opened until 1954, until the short-lived Free Territory of Trieste was divided between Italy and Yugoslavia, thus giving Slovenia access to the sea. This division was ratified only in 1975 with the Treaty of Osimo, which gave a final legal sanction to Slovenia's long disputed western border. From the 1950s, the Socialist Republic of Slovenia exercised relatively wide autonomy.

=== The Stalinist period ===
Between 1945 and 1948, a wave of political repressions took place in Slovenia and in Yugoslavia. Thousands of people were imprisoned for their political beliefs. Several tens of thousands of Slovenes left Slovenia immediately after the war in fear of Communist persecution. Many of them settled in Brazil and Argentina, which became the core of Slovenian anti-Communist emigration. More than 50,000 more followed in the next decade, frequently for economic reasons, as well as political ones. These later waves of Slovene immigrants mostly settled in Canada and in Australia, but also in other western countries.

Additionally, due to the removal of German Yugoslavs (which included in many cases ethnic Slovenes of partial German or Austrian heritage) from Yugoslavia under the leadership of Josip Broz Tito, many citizens were interned in concentration and work camps or forcibly expelled from the country in the years that followed WWII. As a result, a large number of German and Austrian Slovenes emigrated to Italy, Austria, Croatia, Hungary, and other European countries. Most who settled in Hungary during this period fled or were expelled to Germany and Austria in turn. Many expatriates ultimately settled in the Cleveland metropolitan area in the United States; the high concentration of Slovenes in Cleveland specifically is attributed to the industrial opportunities at the time, as well as the existing workforce in the area being largely of Germanic and Slavic descent. Many Slovene expats during this period were sponsored to work in the United States by wealthy Slovenes or Slovene community organizations within the Greater Cleveland area, which greatly contributed to the large Slovene population in the city.

=== The 1948 Tito–Stalin split and aftermath ===
In 1948, the Tito–Stalin split took place. In the first years following the split, the political repression worsened, as it extended to Communists accused of Stalinism. Hundreds of Slovenes were imprisoned in the concentration camp of Goli Otok, together with thousands of people of other nationalities. Among the show trials that took place in Slovenia between 1945 and 1950, the most important were the Nagode trial against democratic intellectuals and left liberal activists (1946) and the Dachau trials (1947–1949), where former inmates of Nazi concentration camps were accused of collaboration with the Nazis. Many members of the Roman Catholic clergy suffered persecution. The case of bishop of Ljubljana Anton Vovk, who was doused with gasoline and set on fire by Communist activists during a pastoral visit to Novo Mesto in January 1952, echoed in the western press.

Between 1949 and 1953, a forced collectivization was attempted. After its failure, a policy of gradual liberalization followed.

=== 1950s: heavy industrialization ===
In the late 1950s, Slovenia was the first of the Yugoslav republics to begin a process of relative pluralization. A decade of industrialisation was accompanied also by a fervent cultural and literary production with many tensions between the government and the dissident intellectuals. From the late 1950s onward, dissident circles started to be formed, mostly around short-lived independent journals, such as Revija 57 (1957–1958), which was the first independent intellectual journal in Yugoslavia and one of the first of this kind in the Communist bloc, and Perspektive (1960–1964). Among the most important critical public intellectuals in this period were the sociologist Jože Pučnik, the poet Edvard Kocbek, and the literary historian Dušan Pirjevec.

=== 1960s: self-management ===
By the late 1960s, the reformist faction gained control of the Slovenian Communist Party, launching a series of reforms, aiming at the modernization of Slovenian society and economy. A new economic policy, known as workers self-management started to be implemented under the advice and supervision of the main champion of the Yugoslav Communist Party, Slovene Edvard Kardelj.

=== 1970s: years of lead ===
In 1973, the reformist trend was stopped by the conservative faction of the Slovenian Communist Party as part of a general reining in of liberal tendencies by the Yugoslav communist authorities. A period known as the "Years of Lead" (Slovene: svinčena leta) followed.

=== 1980s: towards independence ===
In the 1980s, Slovenia experienced a rise in cultural pluralism. Numerous grass-roots political, artistic and intellectual movements emerged, including the Neue Slowenische Kunst, the Ljubljana school of psychoanalysis, and the Nova revija intellectual circle. By the mid-1980s, a reformist fraction, led by Milan Kučan, took control of the Slovenian Communist Party, starting a gradual reform towards market socialism and controlled political pluralism.

== Slovenes in independent Slovenia ==
=== 1990s: Slovenian Spring, democracy and independence ===
The first clear demand for Slovene independence was made in 1987 by a group of intellectuals in the 57th edition of the magazine Nova revija. Demands for democratisation and increase of Slovenian independence were sparked off. A mass democratic movement, coordinated by the Committee for the Defense of Human Rights, pushed the Communists in the direction of democratic reforms. In 1991, Slovenia became an independent nation state after a brief ten-day war. In December 1991, a new constitution was adopted, followed in 1992 by the laws on denationalisation and privatization. The members of the European Union recognised Slovenia as an independent state on 15 January 1992, and the United Nations accepted it as a member on 22 May 1992.

=== 2010s: Slovenian disillusionment with socio-economic elites ===
The disillusionment with domestic socio-economic elites at municipal and the State's level was expressed at the 2012–2013 Slovenian protests on a wider scale than in the smaller 15 October 2011 protests – Slovenian disillusionment with the elites and financial institutions at the European and global level. In relation to the leading politicians' response to allegations made by official Commission for the Prevention of Corruption of the Republic of Slovenia, law experts expressed the need for changes in the system that would limit political arbitrariness.

== Identity ==
Flag of the Slovene Nation

Based on a German name for the Slovenes, Wenden or Winden, the first researchers of the origin of the Slovenes mistakenly believed that they were descendants of the Germanic tribe of the Vandals. Even today, some German speakers refer to the Slovenian minority in Carinthian Austria as Windische, as if a separate ethnicity. This claim is rejected by linguists on the basis that their dialect is by all standards a variant of Slovene. The first to define Slovenes as a separate branch of the Slavic people was Anton Tomaž Linhart in his work An Essay on the History of Carniola and Other Lands of the Austrian South Slavs, published in 1791. In it, Linhart also established the linguistic unity of the Slovene ethnic territory and set the foundations of the Slovene ethnography.

After the disintegration of Yugoslavia during the late 1980s and the formation of independent Slovenia in the early 1990s motivated interest in a particularly Slovenian national identity. One reflection of this was an attempt at the rejection of a Slavic identity in favour of a "Venetic" one. The autochthonist "Venetic theory" was advanced in the mid 1980s, but it never gained wide currency. The identification with Slavic roots remains strong in Slovenia and in 2004 even led to the establishment of the Forum of Slavic Cultures in Ljubljana.

In the late 1980s, several symbols from the Middle Ages were revived as Slovenian national symbols. Among them, the most popular are the so-called Slovene Hat which featured in the coat of arms of the Slovene March, and the Black Panther, a reconstruction of the supposed coat of arms of the Carolingian duchy of Carantania. After being used in the Flag of Slovenia, the graphical representation of Triglav has become recognised as a national symbol. Per the Constitution of Slovenia and the Slovenian act on national symbols, the flag of the Slovene nation is a white-blue-red flag without the coat-of-arms. The ratio of the width to height of the flag is one to two.

=== Language ===
Freising manuscripts are the first written words in Slovene. Four parchment leaves and a further quarter of a page have been preserved. They consist of three texts in the oldest Slovenian dialect. Linguistic, stylistic and contextual analyses reveal that these are church texts of careful composition and literary form.

Primož Trubar (1508–1586) is the author of the first printed book in Slovene. He was a Slovenian Protestant Reformer of the Lutheran tradition.

=== Religion ===
Most ethnic Slovenes are Roman Catholic by faith, with some historical Protestant minorities, especially Lutherans in Prekmurje. A sizable minority of Slovenes are non-religious or atheists, according to the published data from the 2002 Slovenian census, out of a total of 47,488 Muslims (who represent 2.4% of the total population), 2,804 Muslims (who in turn represent 5.9% of the total Muslims in Slovenia) declared themselves as Slovenian Muslims.

== See also ==
- List of Slovenes
- Carinthian Slovenes
- Hungarian Slovenes
- Prekmurje Slovenes
- Slovene minority in Italy
