= 1871 in architecture =

The year 1871 in architecture involved some significant events.

== Events ==
- Abraham Hirsch is appointed chief architect of the French city of Lyon.
- Martin & Chamberlain are appointed architects for the Birmingham board schools in England.
- (end of year) – At the Vienna Hofburg, groundbreaking is held for the new Imperial Natural History Museum (German: K.k. Naturhistorisches Hofmuseum), beginning a 20-year construction project.

== Buildings and structures ==
=== Buildings opened ===
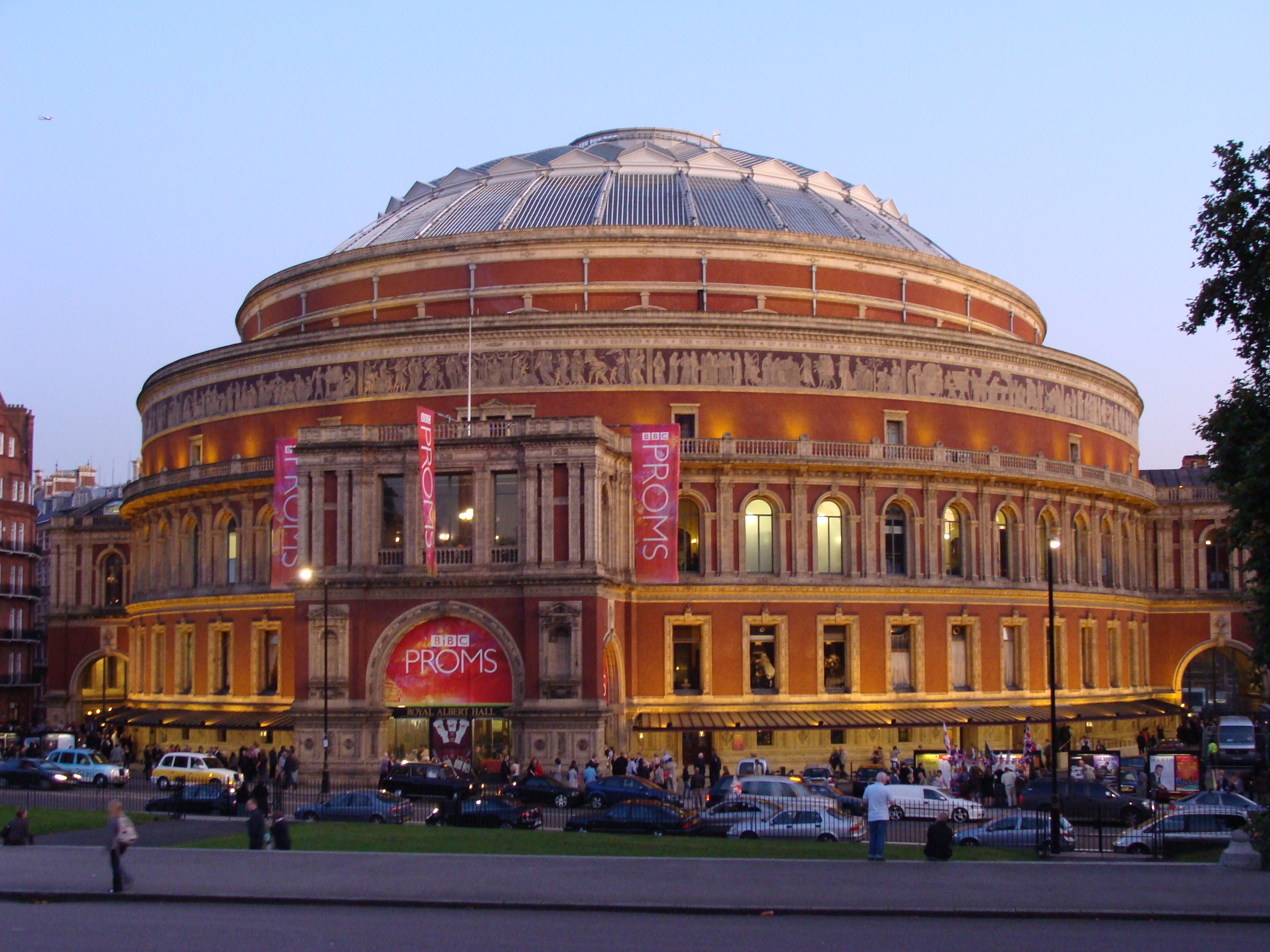
Royal Albert Hall

- March 29 – The Royal Albert Hall in London, designed by Francis Fowke and H. Y. Darracott Scott.
- September 14 – Hokkaidō Shrine, Sapporo, Japan.
- September 27 – Rochdale Town Hall, England, designed by William Henry Crossland.
- October 15 – Church of the Holy Name of Jesus, Manchester, England, designed by Joseph A. Hansom & Son.

=== Buildings completed ===
- Alexandria City Hall, Virginia, USA, designed by Adolph Cluss
- Christ Church, Nazareth, Israel
- Church of Saint-Augustin, Paris, designed by Victor Baltard
- Fort Teremba, New Caledonia
- Jacob Kamm House, Portland, Oregon, USA, designed by Justus F. Krumbein
- Lehrter Bahnhof, Berlin, designed by Alfred Lent, Bertold Scholz and Gottlieb Henri Lapierre.

== Awards ==
- RIBA Royal Gold Medal – James Fergusson
- Grand Prix de Rome, architecture: Émile Ulmann.

== Births ==
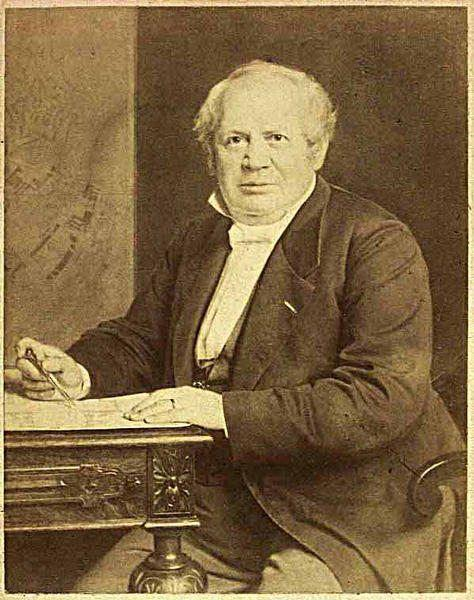
Niels Sigfred Nebelong

- April 12 – August Endell, German Jugendstil architect and designer (died 1925)
- August 22 – Émile André, French architect, artist and furniture designer (died 1933)
- September 10 – Thomas Adams, British urban planner (died 1940)

== Deaths ==
- January 4 – Lewis Vulliamy, English architect (born 1791)
- September 1 – Sir James Pennethorne, English architect and planner (born 1801)
- October 9 – Niels Sigfred Nebelong, Danish historicist architect (born 1806)
