= C. A. Landenberger House =

Historic building in Portland, Oregon, U.S.

- U.S. National Register of Historic Places
- U.S. Historic district – Contributing property
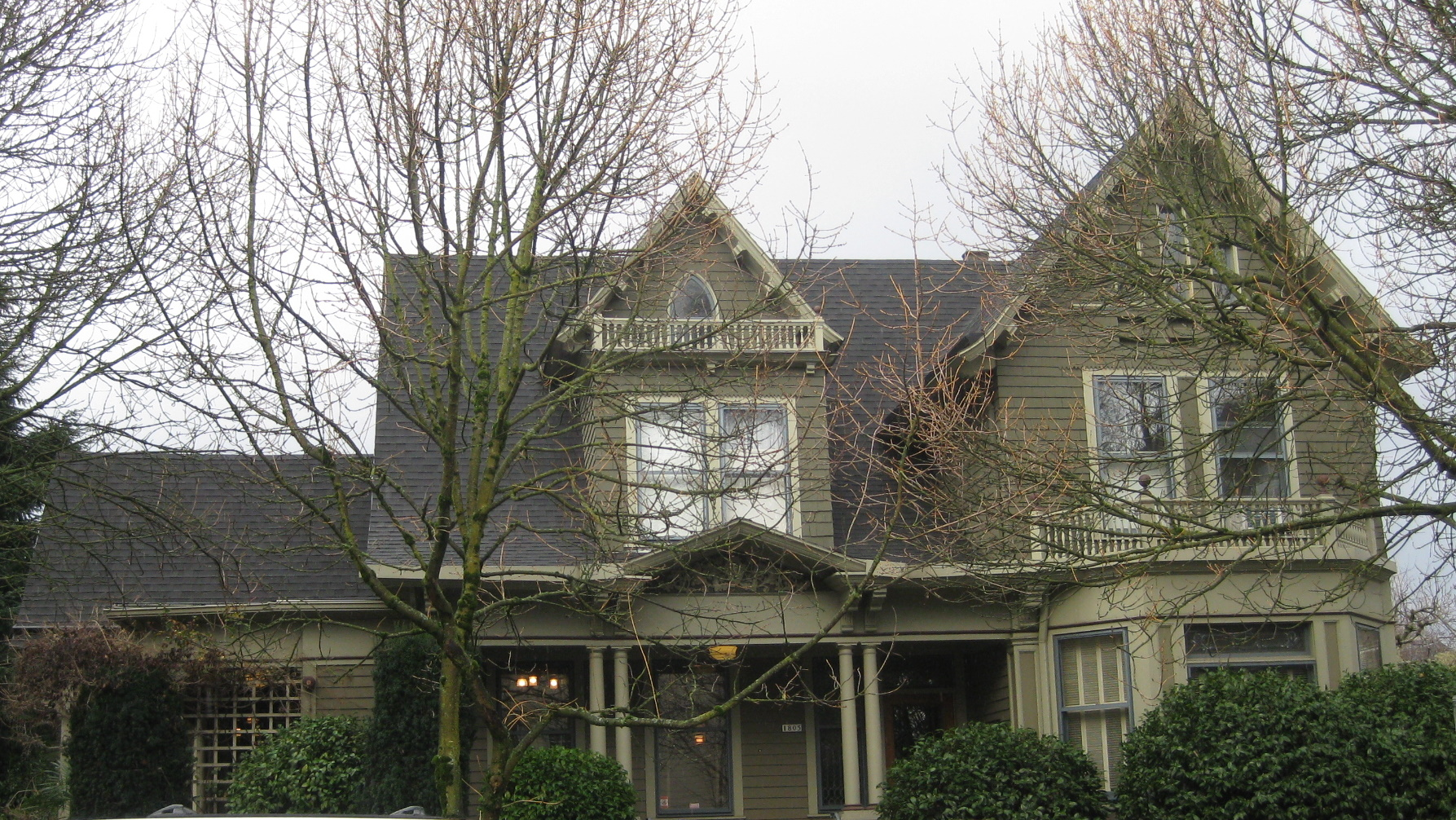
- The house's exterior in 2010

- Location within Portland, Oregon
- Location: 1805 N.W. Glisan St., Portland, Oregon
- Coordinates: 45°31′36″N 122°41′17″W
- Area: less than one acre
- Built: 1896
- Architect: Justus Krumbein
- Architectural style: Queen Anne
- Part of: Alphabet Historic District (ID00001293)
- NRHP reference No.: 88000097
- Added to NRHP: February 29, 1988

The C. A. Landerberger House, also known as the Landenberger-Jorgensen House or the Emil Jorgensen House, is a historic Queen Anne-style house in Portland, Oregon, that was built in 1896. It was listed on the National Register of Historic Places in 1988. It is also a contributing building in the NRHP-listed Alphabet Historic District.

While the 2 1/2-story house has no tower, which is often a salient feature of Queen Anne architecture, the house does have multiple Queen Anne features: it is asymmetrical in design, it has varied bays and projections, and it has varied siding. It rests on an ashlar foundation.

The house is included in a walking tour of the Nob Hill neighborhood. The tour refers to it as one of Portland's first examples of Craftsman architecture.

It was deemed significant for its architecture, and also for its association with Christian Adam Landenberger (c.1830–1906) and family. Christian and his wife Marie, who immigrated together from Germany to New York and moved to Portland in 1866, lived in the house from 1896 until 1906. They left it to their sole surviving child, Pauline, and Pauline's husband Emil C. Jorgensen, who lived in the house until 1931.

In 1987 the house was "in excellent condition and remarkably intact."
