= Haxby & Gillespie =

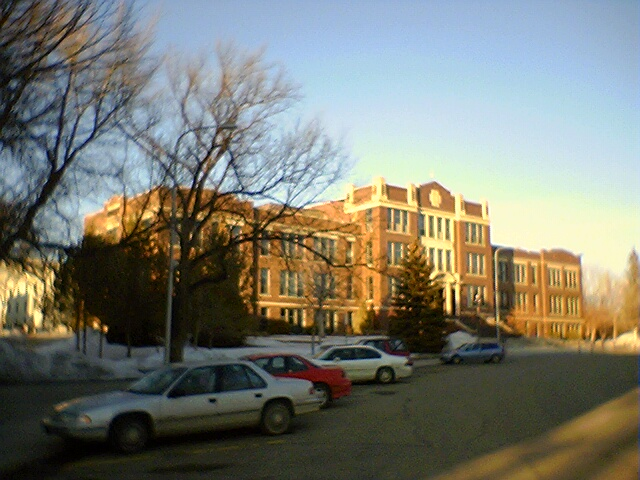
Old Main, Minot State University, 1912.

Haxby & Gillespie was an architectural firm from Fargo, North Dakota. R. J. Haxby and William D. Gillespie were the partners. The firm "produced a number of important buildings throughout North Dakota." They designed many notable public, educational, commercial, and church buildings, in North Dakota, Minnesota, and Montana.

== History ==
Prior to coming to Fargo, R. J. Haxby was a practicing architect in New York City and Superior, Wisconsin. He moved to Fargo late in 1905 after a young architect, William D. Gillespie, advertised for a business partner to take over the practice of his recently deceased brother-in-law, William C. Albrant.

In early 1906 Haxby and Gillespie reorganized Albrant's firm as R. J. Haxby & Company. In September 1906 the firm was renamed Haxby & Gillespie. They remained together until 1916, when Gillespie established his own office. Haxby's firm became Haxby & Braseth, which it remained until the end of 1917, as Haxby had died in August. It was succeeded by Braseth & Rosatti.

Gillespie later retired from architecture and founded a bank, the Gate City Savings and Loan, which became prominent in the state.

R. J. Haxby's son, Robert V. L. Haxby, was an architect in Minneapolis, where he was a partner in the firms of Stebbins & Haxby, Stebbins, Haxby & Bissell, and Haxby & Bissell. He was appointed Minneapolis' school board architect in 1915.

A number of the firm's works are listed on the National Register of Historic Places.

== Architectural works ==
=== R. J. Haxby & Company, 1906 ===
- 1906 - Farmers' and Merchants' National Bank Building, 102 8th St. N., New Rockford, North Dakota.
- 1906 - Minot M. E. Church, 2 2nd Ave. SE, Minot, North Dakota. Demolished.

=== Haxby & Gillespie, 1906-1916 ===
- 1907 - Fargo Armory, 78 Broadway N., Fargo, North Dakota. Demolished.
- 1907 - Port Block, 626 Front St., Casselton, North Dakota.
- 1907 - Ross Public School, Central Ave., Ross, North Dakota.
- 1907 - Sentinel Butte Public School, Byron St., Sentinel Butte, North Dakota. Demolished.
- 1908 - Carrington High School, off U.S. 281, Carrington, North Dakota. Demolished 2008.
- 1908 - Glen Ullin High School, 206 S. 2nd St., Glen Ullin, North Dakota. Demolished 1981.
- 1909 - Carnegie Public Library, 426 Bemidji Ave., Bemidji, Minnesota.
- 1909 - Hebron High School, 400 Church St., Hebron, North Dakota. Demolished.
- 1909 - Ramsey County Jail, 420 6th St., Devils Lake, North Dakota.
- 1909 - Van Es Hall, North Dakota State University, Fargo, North Dakota. Demolished.
- 1910 - Hotel Evelyn, 224 3rd St. E., Thief River Falls, Minnesota. Demolished.
- 1910 - Ladd Hall, North Dakota State University, Fargo, North Dakota.
- 1910 - Valley City City Hall, 216 2nd Ave. NE, Valley City, North Dakota. Demolished.
- 1910 - Wahpeton Armory, 421 E. Cecil Ave., Wahpeton, North Dakota. Demolished 2020.
- 1912 - Old Main, Minot State University, Minot, North Dakota.
- 1913 - Bowdon High School, 319 Warrington Ave., Bowdon, North Dakota.
- 1913 - Hope City Hall, 107 Steele Ave., Hope, North Dakota.
- 1913 - Pioneer Hall, Minot State University, Minot, North Dakota.
- 1913 - Sykeston High School, 114 B St. NE, Sykeston, North Dakota.
- 1913 - Walsh County Agricultural School, 605 6th St. W., Park River, North Dakota. Demolished.
- 1914 - A. O. U. W. Building, 112-114 N. Roberts St., Fargo, North Dakota.
- 1914 - Lowman Block, 406-410 Broadway N., Fargo, North Dakota.
- 1915 - Wolf Point Public School, Wolf Point, Montana. Demolished.

=== Haxby & Braseth, 1916-1917 ===
- 1916 - Mayville High School, Mayville, North Dakota. Demolished.
- 1917 - Woodrow Wilson School, 315 N. University Dr., Fargo, North Dakota.

== Gallery ==
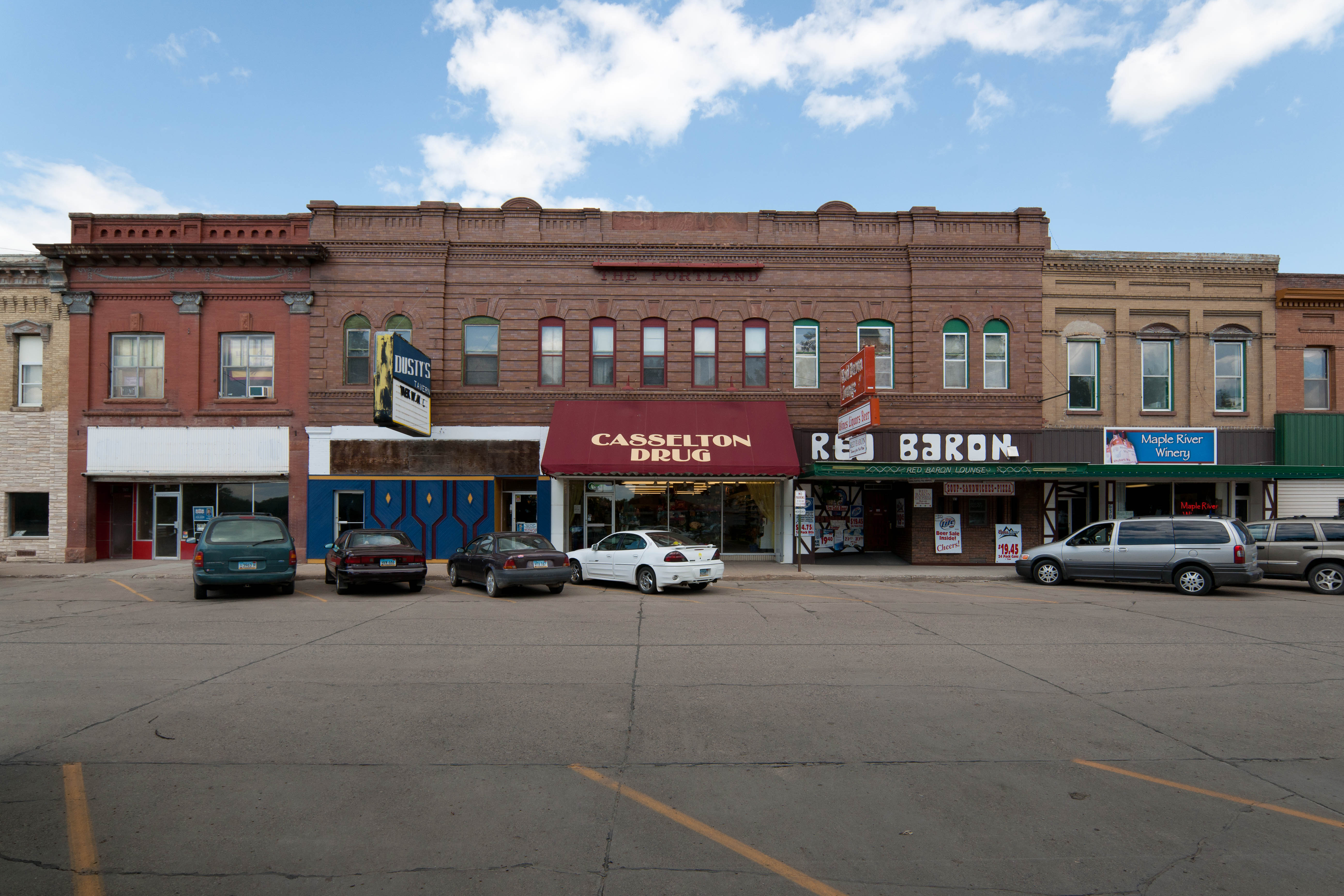
Port Block, Casselton, 1907.

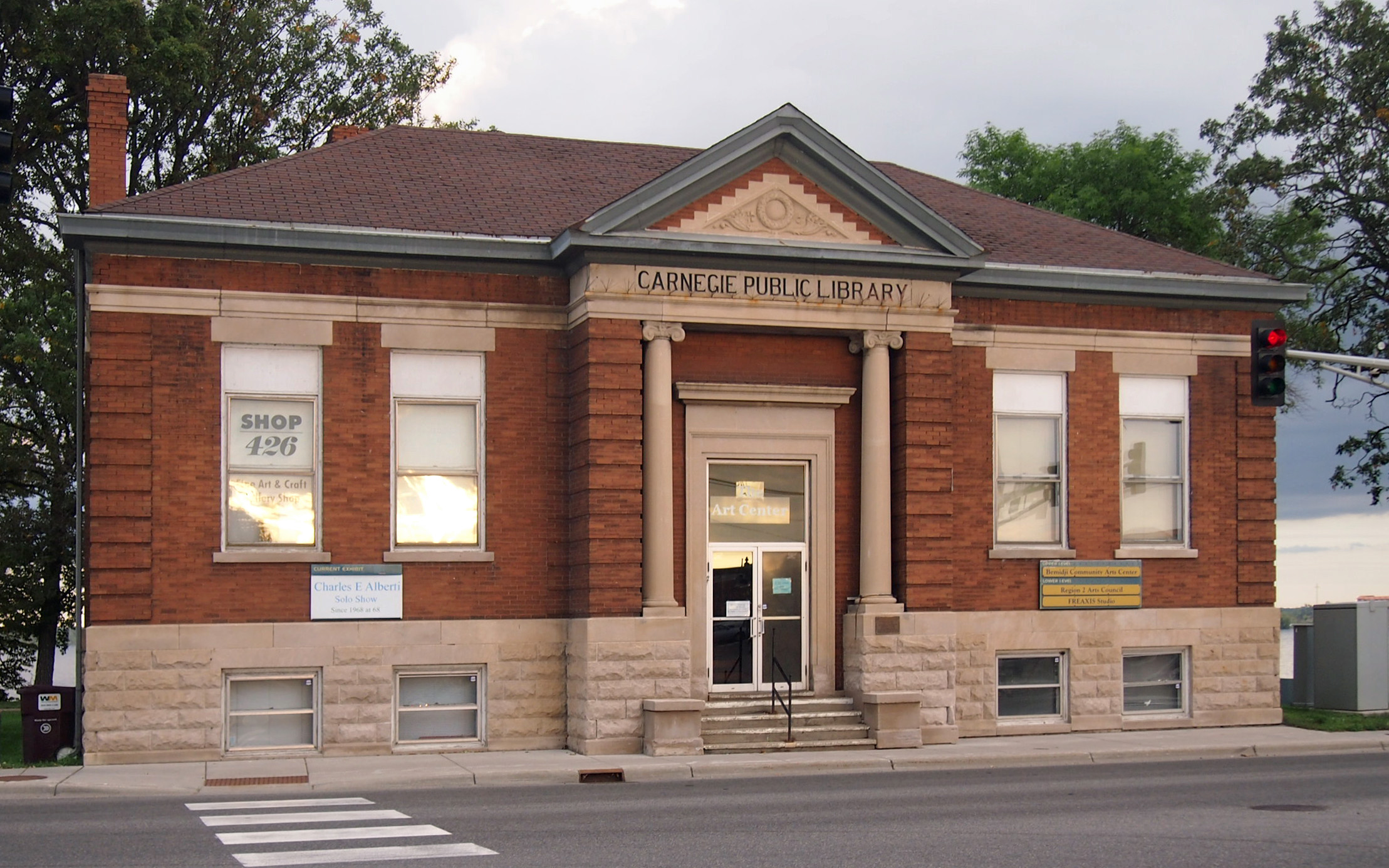
Carnegie Public Library, Bemidji, Minnesota, 1909.

A. O. U. M. Building, Fargo, 1914.
