= Lincoln Building (Carrington, North Dakota) =

- Formerly listed on the U.S. National Register of Historic Places
- Location within North Dakota Location within the United States
- Location: Off U.S. 281, Carrington, North Dakota
- Coordinates: 47°27′7″N 99°7′22″W
- Built: 1908
- Architect: Haxby & Gillespie
- NRHP reference No.: 80002912

Significant dates
- Added to NRHP: April 30, 1980
- Removed from NRHP: February 1, 2011

The Lincoln Building built in 1908 was a historic school building located off U.S. 281 in Carrington, North Dakota. It was designed by Fargo architects Haxby & Gillespie and was built in 1908.

On April 30, 1980, it was added to the National Register of Historic Places. Reportedly, it was scheduled to be torn down in June or July 2008. It was removed from the National Register in February 2011.

== See also ==
- Carrington Public School
