= Clinton J. Hall =

American lawyer and politician

Clinton James Hall (October 3, 1926 – September 12, 1984) was an American lawyer and politician.

Hall was born in Carrington, Foster County, North Dakota, and went to the Carrington Public Elementary and High Schools. He graduated from the University of Minnesota in 1950 and received his law degree from the St. Paul College of Law (now William Mitchell College of Law). Hall served in the Minnesota National Guard during the Korean War. Hall lived in Rushford, Fillmore County, Minnesota, with his wife and family and practiced law in Rushford. Hall served in the Minnesota House of Representatives from 1961 to 1968 and was a Republican. He died in San Diego, California, from heart problems.
