= Perry and Brainard Block =

- U.S. National Register of Historic Places
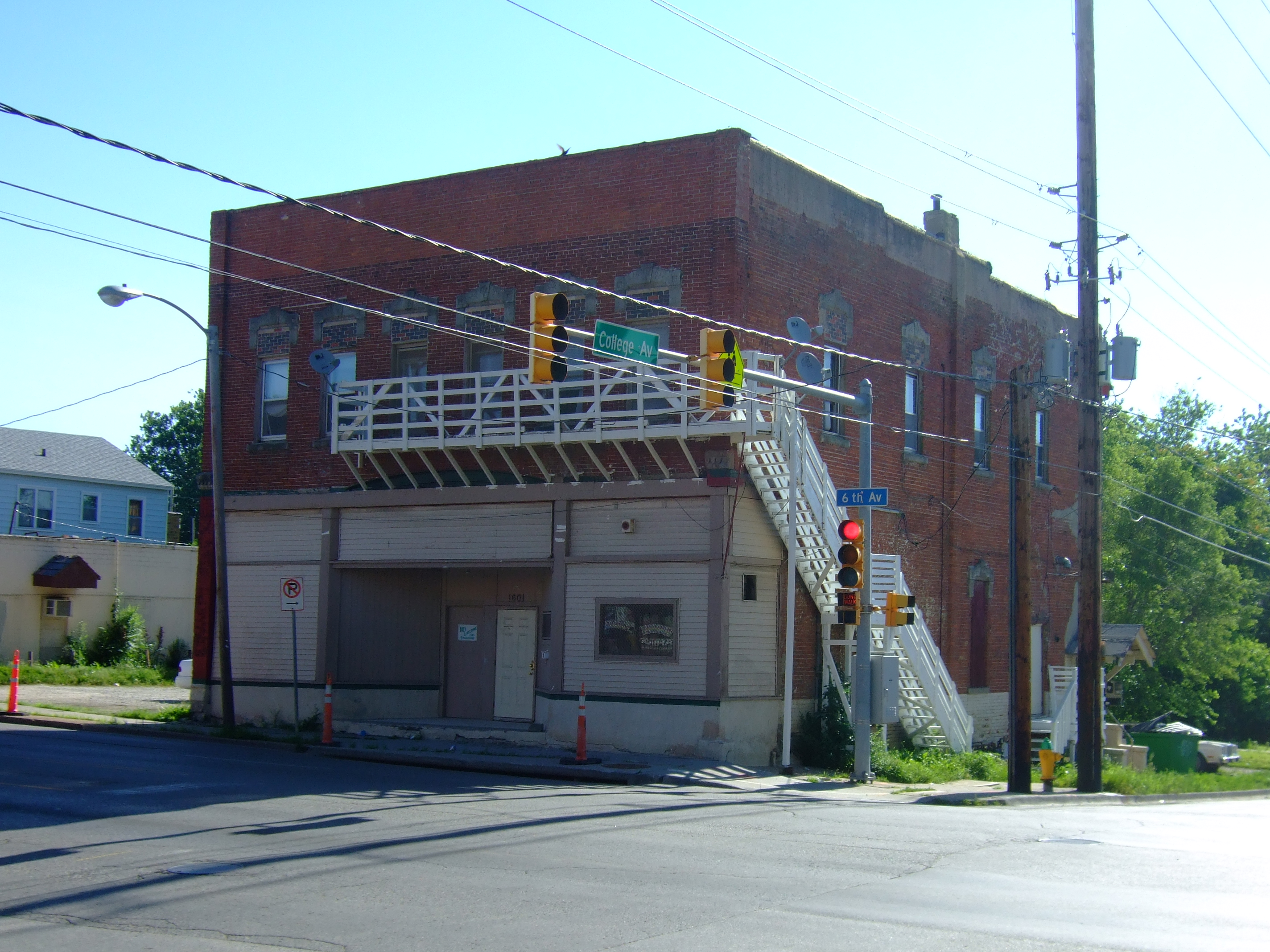

- Location within Iowa Location within the United States
- Location: 1601 6th Ave. Des Moines, Iowa
- Coordinates: 41°36′28.2″N 93°37′32″W
- Area: less than one acre
- Built: 1888-1889
- MPS: Towards a Greater Des Moines MPS
- NRHP reference No.: 96001149
- Added to NRHP: October 25, 1996

The Perry and Brainard Block, also known as the North Des Moines Town Hall, is a historic building located in Des Moines, Iowa, United States. The structure was built between 1888 and 1889, and the second floor served as the city hall for the suburb of North Des Moines. In the late 19th century Des Moines actively sought to annex its Victorian suburbs, with North Des Moines being the largest of these communities. This is the only known public building that has survived from the Annexation Movement era. The local government and community of North Des Moines debated annexation, not only of the municipalities but of their schools as well. It was also the only community where the residents voted on the annexation issue, and this building also served as a polling place. The building served as the location of the celebration after the referendums passed in 1890. After its use as the city hall, the second floor became the lodge for the Ancient Order of United Workmen.

The building's commercial space is also significant in that it is in one of two commercial areas in North Des Moines, which indicates the size and influence the community had in the late 19th century. It was one of the first of the commercial buildings that were constructed at this intersection. The building was listed on the National Register of Historic Places in 1996. It was listed in 2011 as one of Iowa's Most Endangered Properties.
