= Ancient Order of United Workmen Temple =

Former building in Portland, Oregon, U.S.

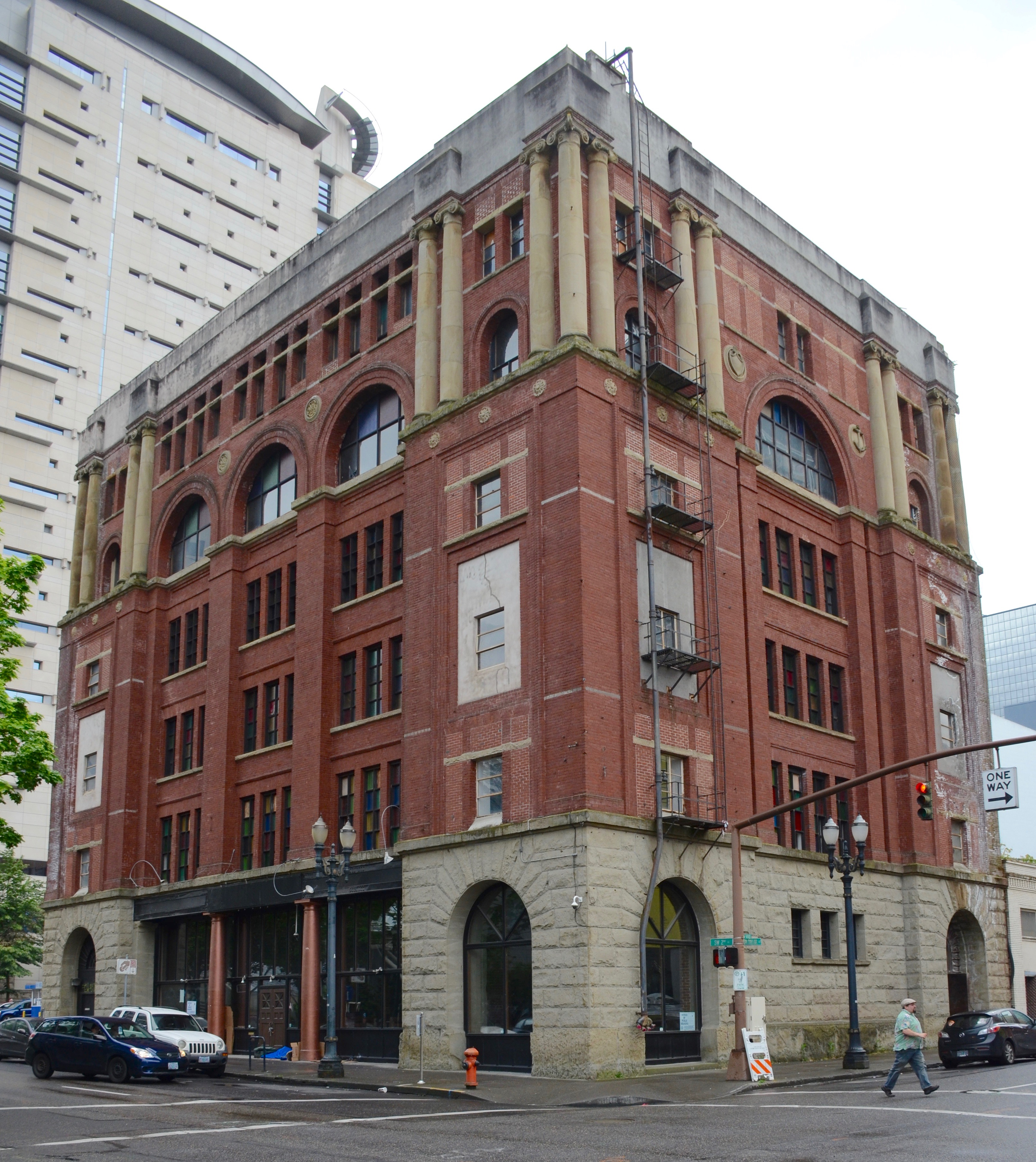
- The building in 2016

- Location within Portland, Oregon
- Alternative names: Tourny Building (or Tourney Building)

General information
- Status: Demolished
- Architectural style: Richardsonian Romanesque
- Location: Portland, Oregon, United States
- Coordinates: 45.516558°N 122.675647°W
- Completed: 1892
- Demolished: 2017

Design and construction
- Architect: Justus F. Krumbein

The Ancient Order of United Workmen Temple, also known as the Tourny Building, was a historic building located at the intersection of Southwest 2nd Avenue and Taylor Street in Portland, Oregon, in the United States. The six-story building was completed in 1892 and it was demolished in 2017 to be replaced by new development. Demolition was underway in August 2017, and it was complete by November of the same year.

== Description and history ==
The building was designed by Justus F. Krumbein, also the architect of the second Oregon State Capitol. Its style had elements of Richardsonian Romanesque architecture and, according to Restore Oregon, it was one of the city's most prominent buildings from the 1890s that was still extant in the 2010s.

Originally serving as a club and office for the Ancient Order of United Workmen (AOUW) fraternal organization, within about 10 years it had been sold by that organization and renamed the Tourny Building, a mixed-use building that initially included apartments. The AOUW retained a library in the building for its members for some years after its sale. The building was sold again in 1905, for $100,000, and again in 1907 for $140,000 (equivalent to $4.8 million in 2025). The offices of the Oregon Historical Society were in the Tourny Building from 1913 until 1917, and its museum was on the first floor.

In 1941, the six-story building was sold to Gilbert Brothers, Inc., who opened a furniture store and warehouse in it. In 1946, a fire gutted the top three floors and destroyed the roof and cornice. Fires had previously broken out in 1916 and 1922, and yet another occurred in 1974, gutting the top two floors.

Portland architect Richard Sundeleaf made modifications in 1942 and 1946, and Zimmer Gunsul Frasca Architects in 1980.

At an unknown date, the building was designated a historical landmark by the city's Historical Landmarks Commission (now known as the Historic Landmarks Commission), but the commission removed the designation in 1973, after concluding that subsequent repainting had lessened the building's historical significance.

=== Delisting and demolition ===
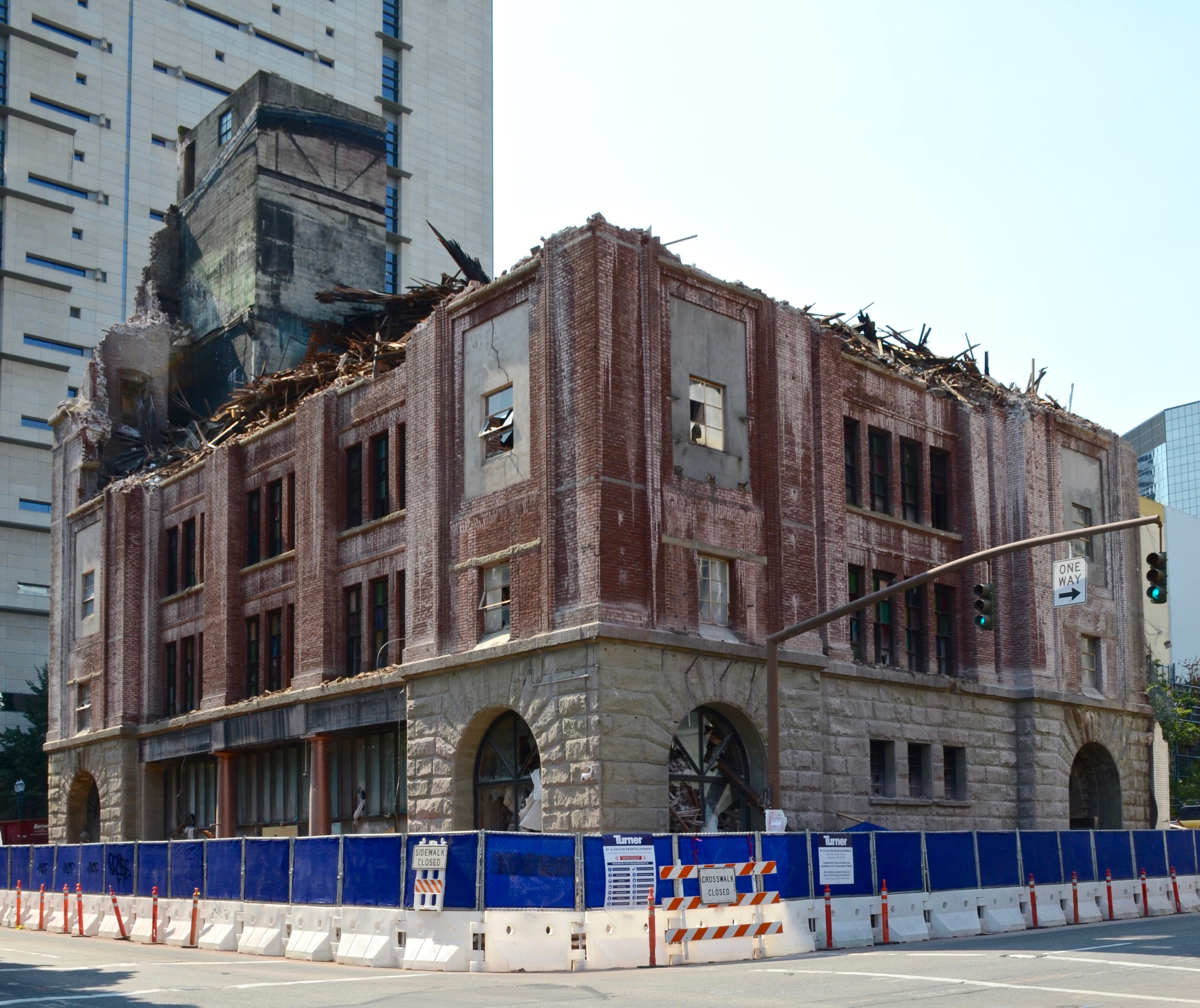
During demolition (September 2017)

In November 2015, it was reported that the City of Portland had removed the building from the city's Historic Resource Inventory, having deemed it unsafe. This opened the possibility of demolition. The Portland Tribune reported in December 2015 that, "Plans provided by Ankrom Moisan Architects show a 20-story hotel and 10-story office building rising on the block", in place of the 1892 building and the nearby Hotel Albion (Lotus Café building).

The completed design for the hotel building proposed to be constructed on the block was approved by the Portland Design Commission, a city-appointed advisory panel, in early July 2016. The plans called for demolition of the United Workmen Temple, and the development team submitted an application for a demolition permit to the city in mid-July 2016. A campaign by the preservation organization Restore Oregon to save the AOUW building and the Hotel Albion was unsuccessful, and the demolition permit was approved in the first months of 2017.

In August 2017, visible demolition of the building began, following a few months of preparatory work inside the structure to remove hazardous material before demolition.

== See also ==
- Grand Lodge of North Dakota, Ancient Order of United Workmen (1914), Fargo, North Dakota
- New Glarus Town Hall, New Glarus, Wisconsin
