= Old Main (Minot State University) =

Historic building in minot state University

Coordinates: 48°14′47″N 101°18′02″W

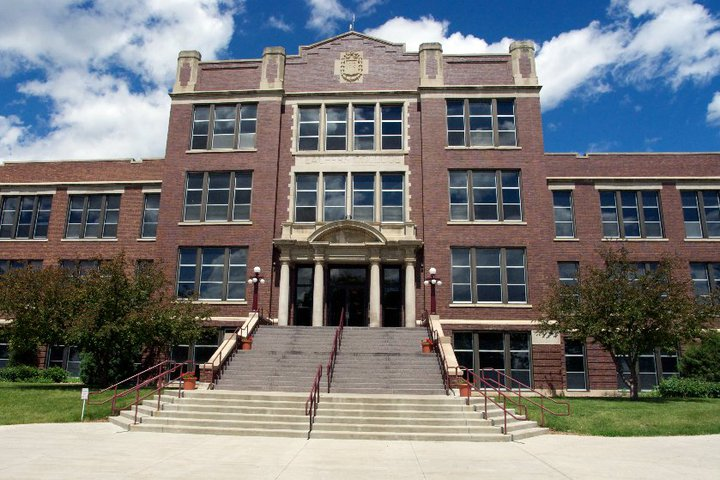
Old Main at Minot State University

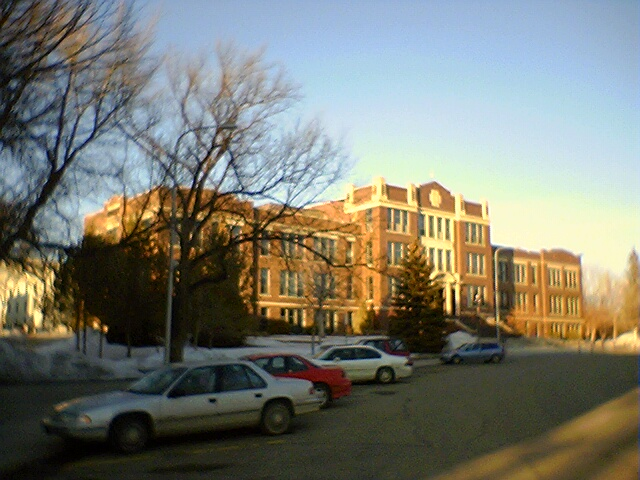
Old Main at Minot State University

Old Main is a historic building on the campus of Minot State University in Minot, North Dakota. It was designed by Fargo architects Haxby & Gillespie in 1912.

Old Main houses the College of Business, Division of Music, and the Social Science Department. Old Main was recently renovated. The building also houses the Ann Nicole Nelson Hall, an auditorium named in honor of Ann Nicole Nelson, a victim of the September 11, 2001 attacks.
