= Grand Lodge of North Dakota, Ancient Order of United Workmen =

Historic place in North Dakota, United States

- U.S. National Register of Historic Places
- U.S. Historic district – Contributing property

- Location within North Dakota Location within the United States
- Location: 112-114 N. Roberts St., Fargo, North Dakota
- Coordinates: 46°52′40″N 96°47′23″W
- Area: less than one acre
- Built: 1914
- Architect: Haxby & Gillespie
- Architectural style: Early Commercial
- Part of: Downtown Fargo District (ID83004064)
- NRHP reference No.: 79001770

Significant dates
- Added to NRHP: August 24, 1979
- Designated CP: October 13, 1983

The Grand Lodge of North Dakota, Ancient Order of United Workmen is a building in Fargo, North Dakota, that was built in 1914 in Early Commercial style. It was designed by architects Haxby & Gillespie. Also known as the Fossum Building and as Interstate Business College, it was listed on the National Register of Historic Places in 1979.

It served historically as a clubhouse of the Ancient Order of United Workmen and as a business.

The building is significant in the history of Fargo and North Dakota, and also significant architecturally.

== See also ==
- Ancient Order of United Workmen Temple (1892), Portland, Oregon
- New Glarus Town Hall, New Glarus, Wisconsin
