= The Royal Guardians =

The Royal Guardians were a mutual benevolent society in Canada. They were organized into lodges and a Grand Lodge which had formerly been the Grand Lodge of The Ancient Order of United Workmen (A.O.U.W.) of Quebec and the Maritime Provinces. It published a monthly journal called ‘’The Protector’’ which included the monthly dues. A dispute over the life insurance owned to a member at Columbus Lodge No. 26 in Montreal in 1908 made its way to the Supreme Court of Canada in 1914 as Royal Guardians v. Clarke

The Ancient Order of United Workmen appears to have been organized, in 1868, in Pennsylvania. The Order comprised a Supreme Lodge by which Grand Lodges of inferior jurisdiction were established, the Grand Lodge of Quebec and the Maritime Provinces being first constituted in 1894. In 1898, this Grand Lodge was registered under the ‘’Benevolent Associations Act’’ of the Province of Quebec and, thereby, became a body corporate. In September, 1907, the Grand Lodge for Quebec and the Maritime Provinces seceded from the parent order and became an entirely independent body. In 1908, the name was changed by the authority of an order of the Lieutenant-Governor in Council of Quebec to “The Royal Guardians” and in May, 1910, after the commencement of this action, the Royal Guardians were incorporated by an Act of the Parliament of Canada.

— Royal Guardians v. Clarke, pg 243- 244
