= Wyard Township, Foster County, North Dakota =

Wyard Township, North Dakota
- Township
- Location within the state of North Dakota
- Coordinates: 47°50′06″N 99°20′04″W
- Country: United States
- State: North Dakota
- County: Foster

Area
  - Total: 35.8 sq mi (93 km^{2})
  - Land: 35.0 sq mi (91 km^{2})
  - Water: 0.8 sq mi (2.1 km^{2})
- Elevation: 1,581 ft (482 m)

Population (2000)
  - Total: 71
  - Density: 2/sq mi (0.77/km^{2})
- Time zone: UTC-6 (Central (CST))
  - Summer (DST): UTC-5 (CDT)
- ZIP code: 58421
- Area code: 701
- FIPS code: 38-87700
- GNIS feature ID: 1759431

Wyard Township is a township in Foster County, North Dakota, United States. It is known for part of Carrington and the artificial lake Wyard Dam, used for recreational purposes, and unofficially known as the Kiwanis Dam. Main highways super two lane U.S. 52/ND200 in the township.
