= Sentinel Butte Public School =

- Formerly listed on the U.S. National Register of Historic Places
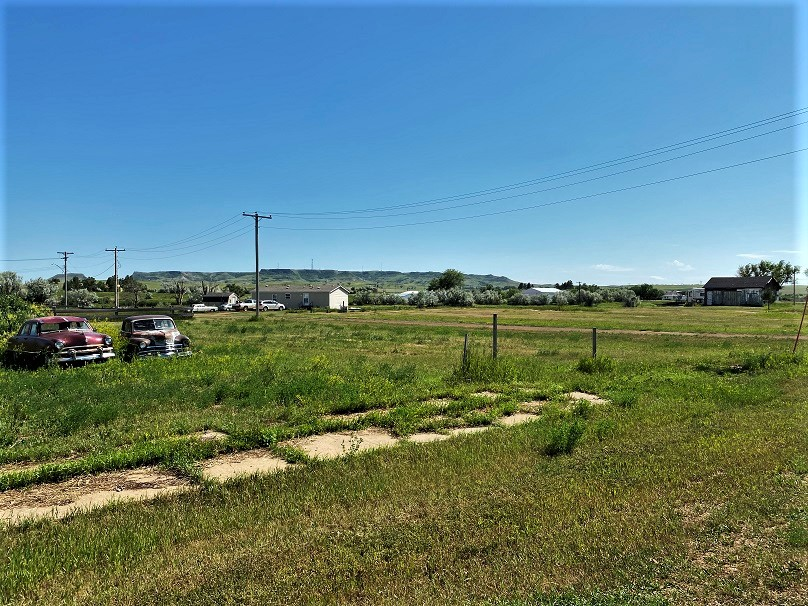
- Site of the school

- Location within North Dakota Location within the United States
- Location: Byron St., Sentinel Butte, North Dakota
- Coordinates: 46°55′3″N 103°50′19″W
- Area: less than one acre
- Built: 1907
- Architect: Haxby & Gillespie
- NRHP reference No.: 82001313

Significant dates
- Added to NRHP: October 21, 1982
- Removed from NRHP: November 15, 2023

The Sentinel Butte Public School on Byron St. in Sentinel Butte, North Dakota, United States, also known as Sentinel Butte High School, was built in 1907. It was listed on the National Register of Historic Places in 1982, for its architecture. It was designed by Fargo architects Haxby & Gillespie. It was delisted in 2023.
