= Barlow, North Dakota =

Unincorporated village in North Dakota, US

Barlow
- Coordinates: 47°34′11″N 99°08′16″W
- Country: United States
- State: North Dakota
- County: Foster County

Barlow is an unincorporated community in Foster County, in the U.S. state of North Dakota. U.S. Route 281 runs through it.

== History ==
A post office called Barlow was established in 1884, and remained in operation until 1965. The community bears the name of Frederich George Barlow, a pioneer settler.

The population was 75 in 1940.
