= Jim Kleinsasser =

American football player (born 1977)

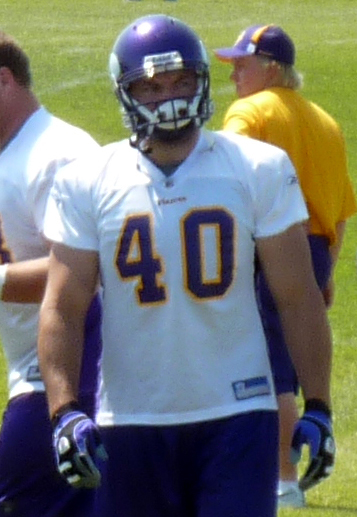
- Kleinsasser in 2009

No. 40
- Position: Tight end / Fullback

Personal information
- Born: January 31, 1977 (age 49); Carrington, North Dakota, U.S.
- Listed height: 6 ft 3 in (1.91 m)
- Listed weight: 272 lb (123 kg)

Career information
- High school: Carrington
- College: North Dakota (1995–1998)
- NFL draft: 1999: 2nd round, 44th overall pick

Career history
- Minnesota Vikings (1999–2011)

Awards and highlights
- 2× First-team DII All-American (1997, 1998); 3× First-team All-NCC (1996–1998)

Career NFL statistics
- Receptions: 192
- Receiving yards: 1,688
- Receiving touchdowns: 6
- Stats at Pro Football Reference
- College Football Hall of Fame

Jimmy Carter Kleinsasser (/ˈklaɪnsɑːsər/; born January 31, 1977) is an American former professional football player who was a tight end and fullback for the Minnesota Vikings of the National Football League (NFL). He played college football for the North Dakota Fighting Sioux and played for the Vikings his entire career after being selected in the 1999 NFL draft.

== Early life ==
Kleinsasser attended Carrington High School, in Carrington, North Dakota and was a letterman and a standout in football, basketball, and track & field. In football, he was a two time All-Region honoree and All-State honoree, and was twice named the Gatorade Circle of Champions North Dakota Player of the Year. At Carrington, Kleinsasser was a starter on the 1995 Class B State Championship basketball team. In track, he has the ND Class B State T&F Meet records for shot put (62 ft, 2 in) and discus throw (183 ft, 11 in).

== College career ==
Kleinsasser attended the University of North Dakota and played for the North Dakota Fighting Sioux from 1995 to 1998 before being drafted by the Minnesota Vikings in 1999. North Dakota was an NCAA Division II school at the time. At North Dakota, Kleinsasser was a three-time first-team All-North Central Conference (NCC) selection and a two-time Division II All-American, also in 1998 was the only Division II football player selected as a Gannett News Service All-American. In 1998, Kleinsasser had 45 receptions for 710 yards and 86 rushing yards. Kleinsasser was named as a member of the 2025 class of the College Football Hall of Fame on January 15, 2025.

== Professional career ==
Pre-draft measurables
Height	Weight	Arm length	Hand span	40-yard dash	10-yard split	20-yard split	20-yard shuttle	Three-cone drill	Vertical jump	Broad jump	Bench press
6 ft 2 3/4 in (1.90 m)	272 lb (123 kg)	33 in (0.84 m)	9 7/8 in (0.25 m)	4.78 s	1.69 s	2.77 s	4.33 s	7.24 s	34.5 in (0.88 m)	9 ft 6 in (2.90 m)	18 reps
All values from NFL Combine

Kleinsasser was selected as a tight end in the second round (44th overall pick) of the 1999 NFL draft. He demonstrated remarkable durability throughout his career, playing in all 16 games up to 2010, except for missing 15 games because of an knee injury in 2004.

In 2007 and 2008, Kleinsasser was named to USA Today's All Joe Team honoring hard workers and under-recognized players. He continued his 13-year career with the Vikings in the 2011 season. He ranked second in team history for starts made by a tight end with 119, and ranked fourth in catches by a tight end in Vikings history. His blocking skills also paved the way for seven of the top eight single-season rushing marks in Vikings history, including Adrian Peterson's then team record and NFL leading 1,760 yards in 2008. Kleinsasser retired at the end of the 2011 NFL season after 13 seasons with the Vikings.

== In popular culture ==
In the movie 50 First Dates, Kleinsasser is mentioned by Sean Astin's character briefly before Kleinsasser scores a touchdown on the TV.
