= Casselton Commercial Historic District =

Historic district in North Dakota, United States

- U.S. National Register of Historic Places
- U.S. Historic district
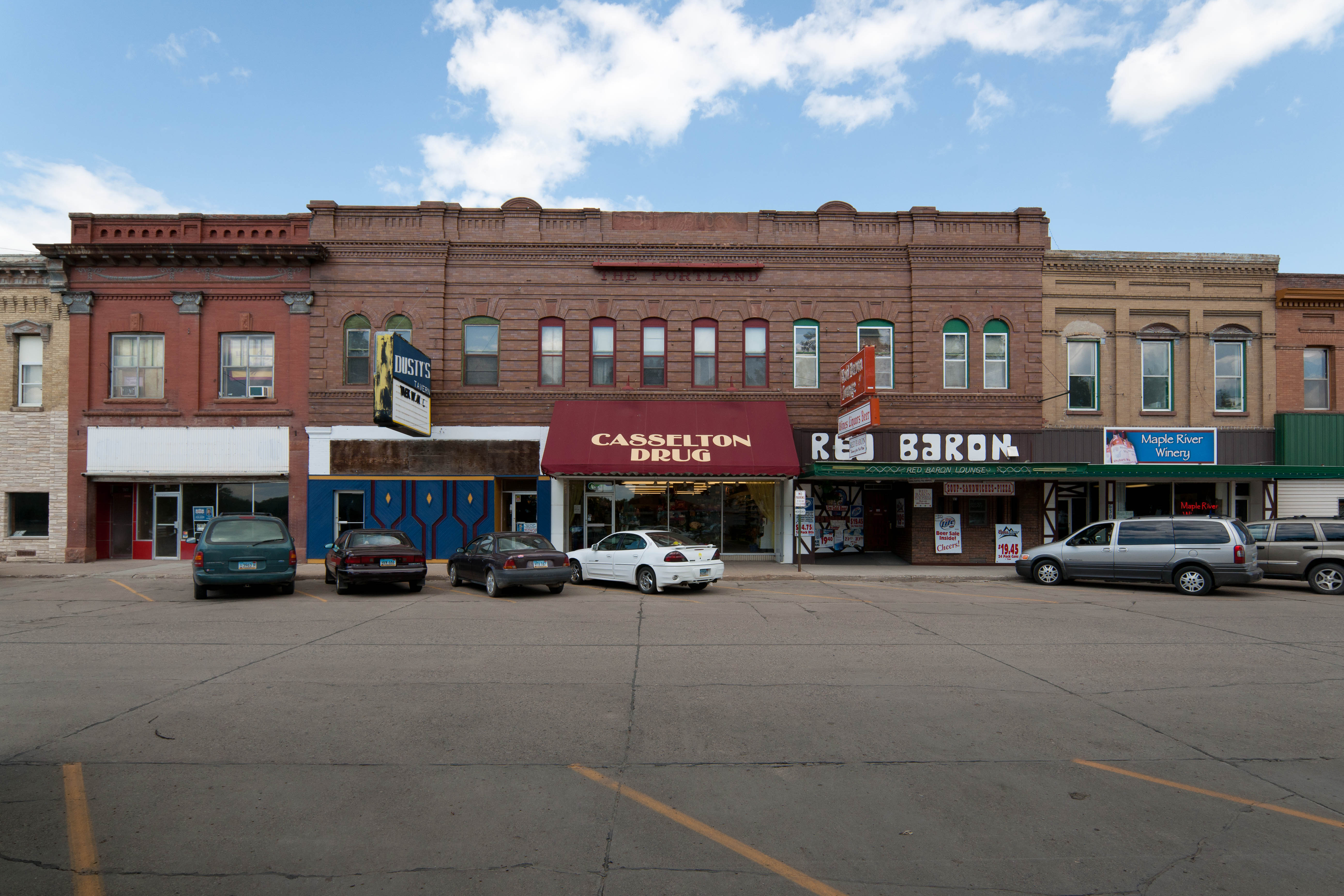
- 600 block of Front Street, with Port Block at center

- Location within North Dakota Location within the United States
- Location: Roughly bounded by Front and 1st St. between 6th and 8th Ave., Casselton, North Dakota
- Coordinates: 46°54′3″N 97°12′38″W
- Area: 9.3 acres (3.8 ha)
- Architect: Daniels & Proctor; George Hancock; Haxby & Gillespie
- NRHP reference No.: 82001311
- Added to NRHP: October 28, 1982

Casselton Commercial Historic District is a 9.3-acre (3.8 ha) historic district in Casselton, North Dakota that was listed on the National Register of Historic Places in 1982.

The listing included 16 contributing buildings which historically included a department store, a financial institution, a Masonic meeting hall and other businesses.

The Masonic Block, at 31 Sixth Avenue North was built in 1887 in two parts, the first being a 50 by 90 feet (15 m × 27 m) part with four brick pilasters and a pressed metal cornice. The center of the cornice contains the words "MASONIC BLOCK", the date "1887" and a Masonic emblem. A second 50 by 90 feet (15 m × 27 m) part was built adjacent, with identical cornice and finial. In 2013, no Masonic lodges were known to be scheduled to meet in the building.
