= Foster County, North Dakota =

County in North Dakota, United States

- County
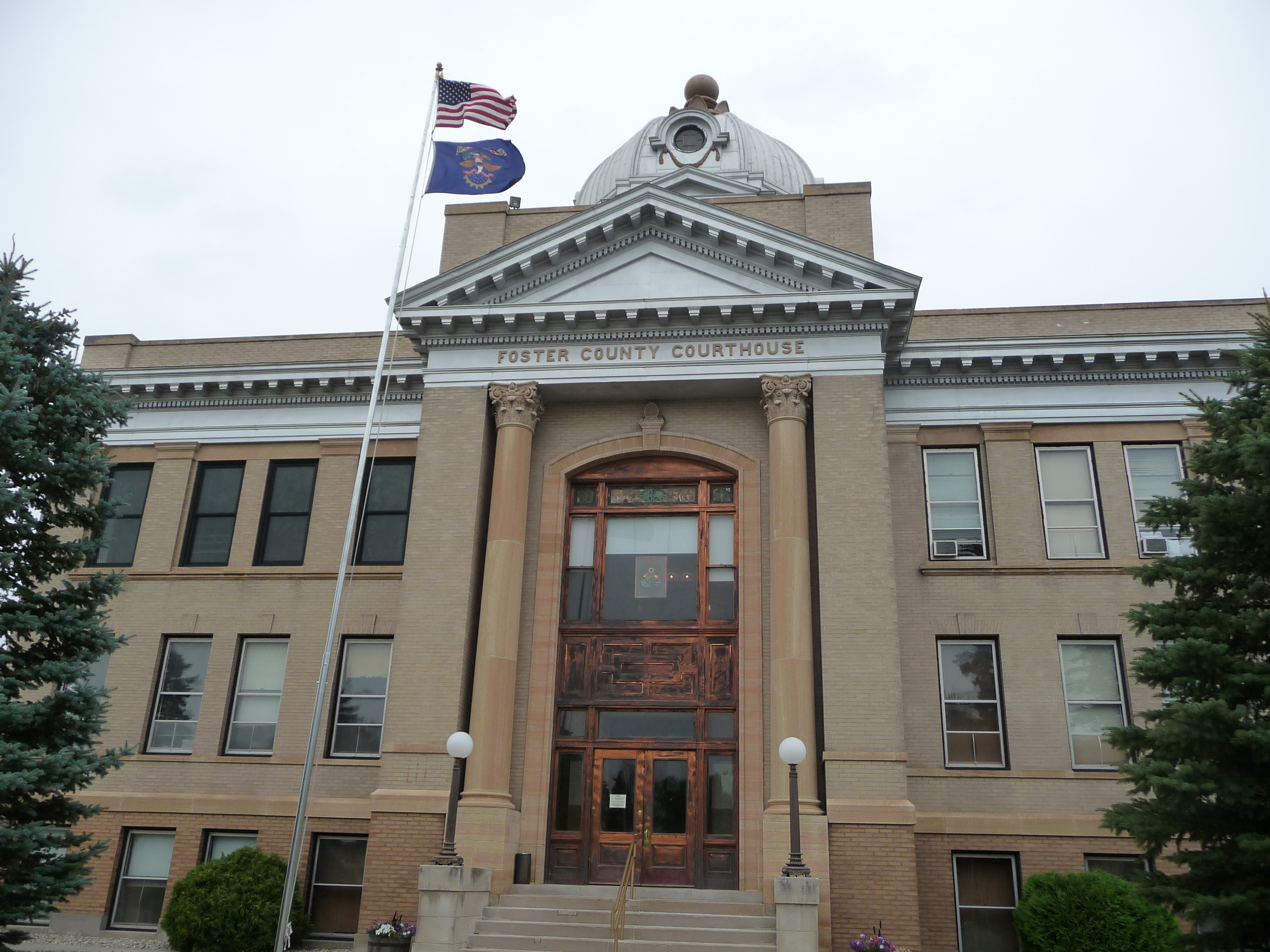
- The Foster County Courthouse in Carrington

- Location within the U.S. state of North Dakota
- Coordinates: 47.471431°N 98.872876°W
- Country: United States
- State: North Dakota
- Founded: January 4, 1873 (created); October 11, 1883 (organized)
- Seat: Carrington
- Largest city: Carrington

Area
  - Total: 646.862 sq mi (1,675.36 km^{2})
  - Land: 634.080 sq mi (1,642.26 km^{2})
  - Water: 12.782 sq mi (33.11 km^{2}) 1.98%

Population (2020)
  - Total: 3,397
  - Estimate (2025): 3,212 ▼
  - Density: 5.239/sq mi (2.023/km^{2})
- Time zone: UTC−6 (Central)
  - Summer (DST): UTC−5 (CDT)
- Area code: 701
- Congressional district: At-large
- Website: fostercounty.com

Foster County is a county in the U.S. state of North Dakota. As of the 2020 census, the population was 3,397, and was estimated to be 3,212 in 2025. The county seat and the largest city is Carrington.

== History ==
The Dakota Territory legislature created the county on January 4, 1873, with lands partitioned from Pembina County. It was named for George I. Foster, a pioneer and member of the Territorial legislature. Its governing structure was not completed at that time, and it was not attached to another county for administrative purposes. Its boundaries were altered in 1881, two times in 1883, and finally in 1885 its boundary was set at the present configuration. Its county organization was effected on October 11, 1883.

== Geography ==
The James River flows south-southeastward through the central part of Foster County. The county terrain consists of low rolling hills, mostly devoted to agriculture, its eastern portion dotted with lakes and ponds. The terrain slopes to the south and east; its highest point is at its southwestern corner, at 1,942 ft (592 m) ASL.

According to the United States Census Bureau, the county has a total area of 646.862 square miles (1,675.36 km^{2}), of which 634.080 square miles (1,642.26 km^{2}) is land and 12.782 square miles (33.11 km^{2}) (1.98%) is water. It is the 52nd largest county and the second-smallest county in North Dakota by total area.

=== Major highways ===
- U.S. Highway 52
- U.S. Highway 281
- North Dakota Highway 9
- North Dakota Highway 20
- North Dakota Highway 200

=== Adjacent counties ===
- Eddy County - north
- Griggs County - east
- Stutsman County - south
- Wells County - west

=== National protected area ===
- Arrowwood National Wildlife Refuge (part)

=== Lakes ===
- Blue Cloud Lake
- Jack Lake
- Juanita Lake
- Lake Bonita
- Lake George
- Russell Lake

== Demographics ==
Historical population
Census	Pop.	Note	%±
1880	37		—
1890	1,210		3,170.3%
1900	3,770		211.6%
1910	5,313		40.9%
1920	6,108		15.0%
1930	6,353		4.0%
1940	5,824		−8.3%
1950	5,337		−8.4%
1960	5,361		0.4%
1970	4,832		−9.9%
1980	4,611		−4.6%
1990	3,983		−13.6%
2000	3,759		−5.6%
2010	3,343		−11.1%
2020	3,397		1.6%
2025 (est.)	3,212	▼	−5.4%
U.S. Decennial Census; 1790–1960 1900–1990; 1990–2000 2010–2020

As of the fourth quarter of 2024, the median home value in Foster County was $172,495.

As of the 2023 American Community Survey, there are 1,515 estimated households in Foster County with an average of 2.16 persons per household. The county has a median household income of $83,412. Approximately 11.4% of the county's population lives at or below the poverty line. Foster County has an estimated 67.5% employment rate, with 27.2% of the population holding a bachelor's degree or higher and 93.2% holding a high school diploma.

The top five reported ancestries (people were allowed to report up to two ancestries, thus the figures will generally add to more than 100%) were English (97.9%), Spanish (0.3%), Indo-European (1.8%), Asian and Pacific Islander (0.0%), and Other (0.0%).

The median age in the county was 43.3 years.

Foster County, North Dakota – racial and ethnic composition
Note: the US Census treats Hispanic/Latino as an ethnic category. This table excludes Latinos from the racial categories and assigns them to a separate category. Hispanics/Latinos may be of any race.

Race / ethnicity (NH = non-Hispanic)	Pop. 1980	Pop. 1990	Pop. 2000	Pop. 2010	Pop. 2020
White alone (NH)	4,572 (99.15%)	3,949 (99.15%)	3,717 (98.88%)	3,272 (97.88%)	3,199 (94.17%)
Black or African American alone (NH)	1 (0.02%)	0 (0.00%)	5 (0.13%)	3 (0.09%)	7 (0.21%)
Native American or Alaska Native alone (NH)	18 (0.39%)	22 (0.55%)	16 (0.43%)	20 (0.6%)	18 (0.53%)
Asian alone (NH)	5 (0.11%)	2 (0.05%)	0 (0.00%)	3 (0.09%)	13 (0.38%)
Pacific Islander alone (NH)	—	—	0 (0.00%)	0 (0.00%)	0 (0.00%)
Other race alone (NH)	4 (0.09%)	0 (0.00%)	1 (0.03%)	0 (0.00%)	6 (0.18%)
Mixed race or multiracial (NH)	—	—	13 (0.35%)	16 (0.48%)	88 (2.59%)
Hispanic or Latino (any race)	11 (0.24%)	10 (0.25%)	7 (0.19%)	29 (0.87%)	66 (1.94%)
Total	4,611 (100.00%)	3,983 (100.00%)	3,759 (100.00%)	3,343 (100.00%)	3,397 (100.00%)

=== 2024 estimate ===
As of the 2024 estimate, there were 3,323 people and 1,515 households residing in the county. There were 1,790 housing units at an average density of 2.82 per square mile (1.1/km^{2}). The racial makeup of the county was 93.9% White (91.8% NH White), 1.0% African American, 1.7% Native American, 2.1% Asian, 0.0% Pacific Islander, _% from some other races and 1.3% from two or more races. Hispanic or Latino people of any race were 2.1% of the population.

=== 2020 census ===
As of the 2020 census, there were 3,397 people, 1,458 households, and 924 families residing in the county. The population density was 5.36 inhabitants per square mile (2.1/km^{2}). There were 1,773 housing units at an average density of 2.80 per square mile (1.1/km^{2}).

Of the residents, 22.7% were under the age of 18 and 21.9% were 65 years of age or older; the median age was 45.5 years. For every 100 females there were 100.4 males, and for every 100 females age 18 and over there were 103.2 males.

The racial makeup of the county was 94.6% White, 0.2% Black or African American, 0.6% American Indian and Alaska Native, 0.4% Asian, 0.9% from some other race, and 3.3% from two or more races. Hispanic or Latino residents of any race comprised 1.9% of the population.

Of the 1,458 households in the county, 26.0% had children under the age of 18 living with them and 20.4% had a female householder with no spouse or partner present. About 31.9% of all households were made up of individuals and 13.2% had someone living alone who was 65 years of age or older.

There were 1,773 housing units, of which 17.8% were vacant. Among occupied housing units, 76.8% were owner-occupied and 23.2% were renter-occupied. The homeowner vacancy rate was 1.1% and the rental vacancy rate was 15.8%.

=== 2010 census ===
As of the 2010 census, there were 3,343 people, 1,495 households, and 930 families residing in the county. The population density was 5.26 inhabitants per square mile (2.0/km^{2}). There were 1,801 housing units at an average density of 2.83 per square mile (1.1/km^{2}). The racial makeup of the county was 98.44% White, 0.09% African American, 0.60% Native American, 0.09% Asian, 0.00% Pacific Islander, 0.24% from some other races and 0.54% from two or more races. Hispanic or Latino people of any race were 0.87% of the population.

In terms of ancestry, 54.2% were German, 35.9% were Norwegian, 9.8% were Irish, 5.8% were American, and 5.1% were Swedish.

There were 1,495 households, 23.7% had children under the age of 18 living with them, 53.4% were married couples living together, 5.5% had a female householder with no husband present, 37.8% were non-families, and 33.5% of all households were made up of individuals. The average household size was 2.20 and the average family size was 2.81. The median age was 46.7 years.

The median income for a household in the county was $41,066 and the median income for a family was $55,278. Males had a median income of $40,076 versus $29,189 for females. The per capita income for the county was $27,945. About 3.4% of families and 7.3% of the population were below the poverty line, including 5.2% of those under age 18 and 13.4% of those age 65 or over.

== Communities ==
=== Cities ===
- Carrington (county seat)
- Glenfield
- Grace City
- McHenry

=== Unincorporated communities ===
- Barlow
- Bordulac
- Guptill
- Juanita
- Melville

== Government ==
The county is divided into 18 townships for certain aspects of governance.

=== Townships ===
- Birtsell
- Bordulac township
- Bucephalia
- Carrington
- Eastman
- Estabrook
- Florance
- Glenfield
- Haven
- Larrabee
- Longview
- McHenry
- McKinnon
- Melville
- Nordmore
- Rolling Prairie
- Rose Hill
- Wyard

== Politics ==
Foster County voters have traditionally voted Republican. In only two national elections since 1948 has the county selected the Democratic Party candidate (as of 2024).

United States presidential election results for Foster County, North Dakota
Year	Republican		Democratic		Third party(ies)	
Year	No.	%	No.	%	No.	%
1900	415	61.48%	241	35.70%	19	2.81%
1904	618	71.69%	223	25.87%	21	2.44%
1908	569	56.00%	434	42.72%	13	1.28%
1912	285	29.97%	403	42.38%	263	27.66%
1916	549	44.45%	662	53.60%	24	1.94%
1920	1,583	78.99%	371	18.51%	50	2.50%
1924	922	45.13%	287	14.05%	834	40.82%
1928	1,137	48.99%	1,178	50.75%	6	0.26%
1932	609	24.65%	1,838	74.38%	24	0.97%
1936	685	24.83%	1,894	68.65%	180	6.52%
1940	1,109	43.20%	1,446	56.33%	12	0.47%
1944	891	44.39%	1,102	54.91%	14	0.70%
1948	938	44.82%	1,089	52.03%	66	3.15%
1952	1,558	64.17%	862	35.50%	8	0.33%
1956	1,234	53.51%	1,062	46.05%	10	0.43%
1960	1,351	53.34%	1,182	46.66%	0	0.00%
1964	927	41.31%	1,315	58.60%	2	0.09%
1968	1,119	52.31%	897	41.94%	123	5.75%
1972	1,352	60.28%	861	38.39%	30	1.34%
1976	1,120	48.59%	1,147	49.76%	38	1.65%
1980	1,534	66.61%	586	25.45%	183	7.95%
1984	1,422	64.23%	765	34.55%	27	1.22%
1988	1,218	58.84%	837	40.43%	15	0.72%
1992	803	41.39%	565	29.12%	572	29.48%
1996	801	45.93%	664	38.07%	279	16.00%
2000	1,172	67.24%	474	27.19%	97	5.57%
2004	1,219	69.03%	518	29.33%	29	1.64%
2008	914	55.36%	687	41.61%	50	3.03%
2012	1,030	61.24%	607	36.09%	45	2.68%
2016	1,241	72.19%	347	20.19%	131	7.62%
2020	1,362	76.60%	373	20.98%	43	2.42%
2024	1,326	77.86%	335	19.67%	42	2.47%

== Education ==
School districts include:

- Midkota Public School District 7
- New Rockford-Sheyenne Public School District 2
- Carrington Public School District 10
- Kensal Public School District 19

== See also ==
- National Register of Historic Places listings in Foster County, North Dakota
