= New Glarus Town Hall =

- U.S. National Register of Historic Places
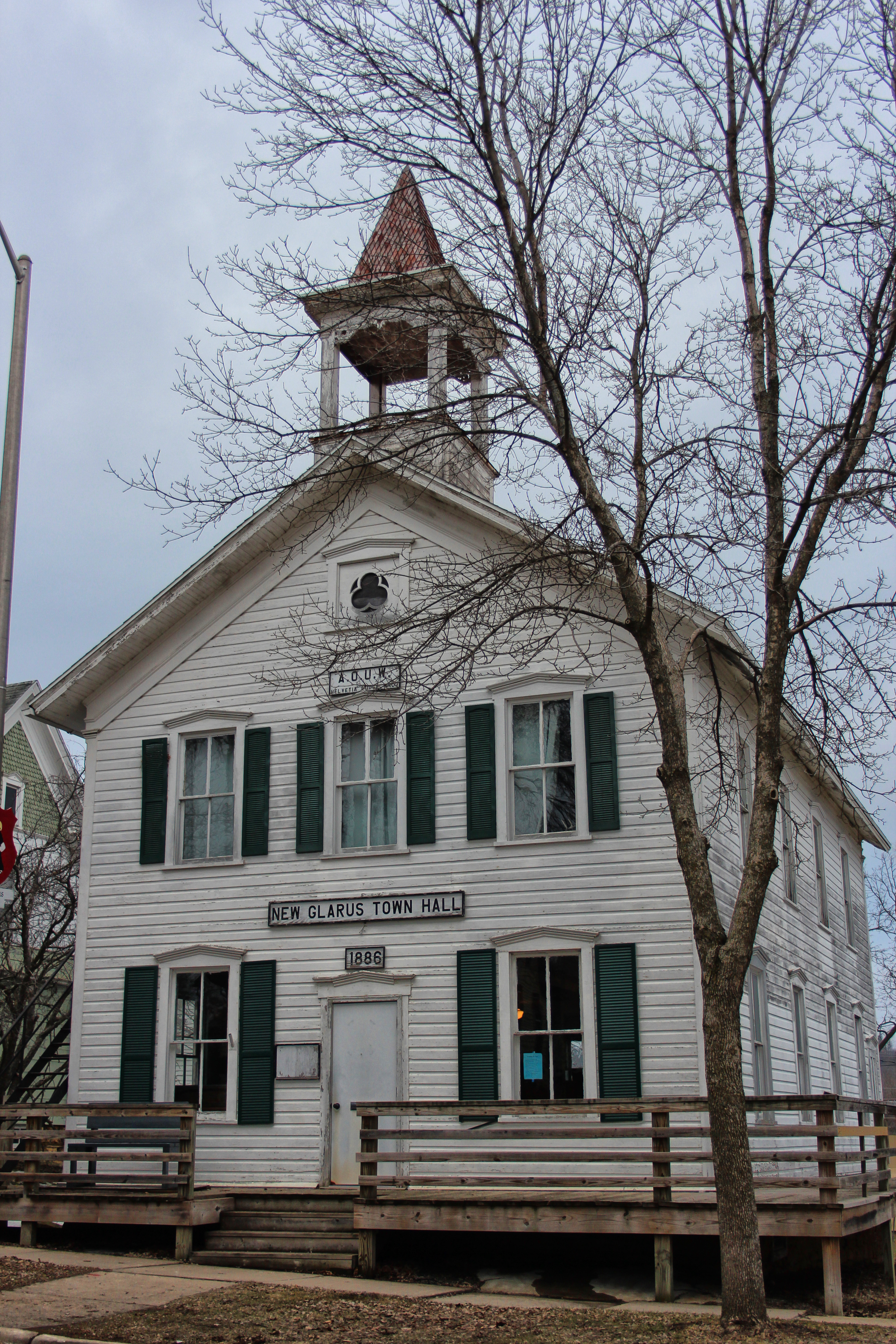
- Location: 206 2nd St. New Glarus, Wisconsin
- Coordinates: 42.81781°N 89.6349°W
- Built: 1886
- NRHP reference No.: 08000286
- Added to NRHP: April 11, 2008

The New Glarus Town Hall in New Glarus, Wisconsin, was built in 1886 to house both the town hall and a meeting place for the Ancient Order of United Workmen. It was added to the National Register of Historic Places in 2008.

== History ==
The first settlers came to New Glarus in 1845, immigrants from Glarus, Switzerland. By the 1880s the community had over 1000 residents, with many occupied in farming, cheese-making, and supporting activities. In 1886 the town and the Ancient Order of United Workmen decided to build a structure to house meetings of both organizations. The town bought the land and paid for the basement and first story; the AOUW built the second story.

The building still looks much as when built. Sitting on a foundation of limestone blocks, it is a two-story frame structure with symmetric openings, small corner pilasters, fascia board beneath the eaves, and a raking cornice - all characteristic of the Greek Revival style. At the attic level below the peak is a small window in the shape of a Gothic trefoil. On top is an open belfry topped with a weather vane.

Inside, most of the first floor is one large room for town meetings, with voting booths in the northeast corner. Bars on some of the basement windows attest to the fact that the basement once housed two jail cells. Most of the second story is one large room which was the meeting hall of the New Glarus AOUW, still furnished with some of the lodge's original wooden furniture.

The town's part of the hall hosted elections and a municipal court, in addition to the jail cells. Membership in the New Glarus OAUW peaked around the 1890s, then declined. Over the years, other fraternal organizations were allowed to use the building, including local chapters of the Women's Relief Corps of the GAR, the Odd Fellows and Sisters of Rebekah, the Gegenseitige Unterstützungs Gesellschaft Germania, the Wilhelm Tell Guild shooting club, the New Glarus Männerchor, the Edelweiss Stars, the Swiss choir, the Cub Scouts and Boy Scouts, and the 4-H club. The building was also used for potlucks, dances and by the school.

The hall is on the NRHP because it is a "superb example of a late 19th century rural town hall building" and because of its role in the social life of New Glarus, in that the second floor hosted many community groups in addition to the UAOW.

== See also ==
- Ancient Order of United Workmen Temple (1892), Portland, Oregon
- Grand Lodge of North Dakota, Ancient Order of United Workmen (1914), Fargo, North Dakota
