= Ancient Order of United Workmen =

Fraternal benefit society

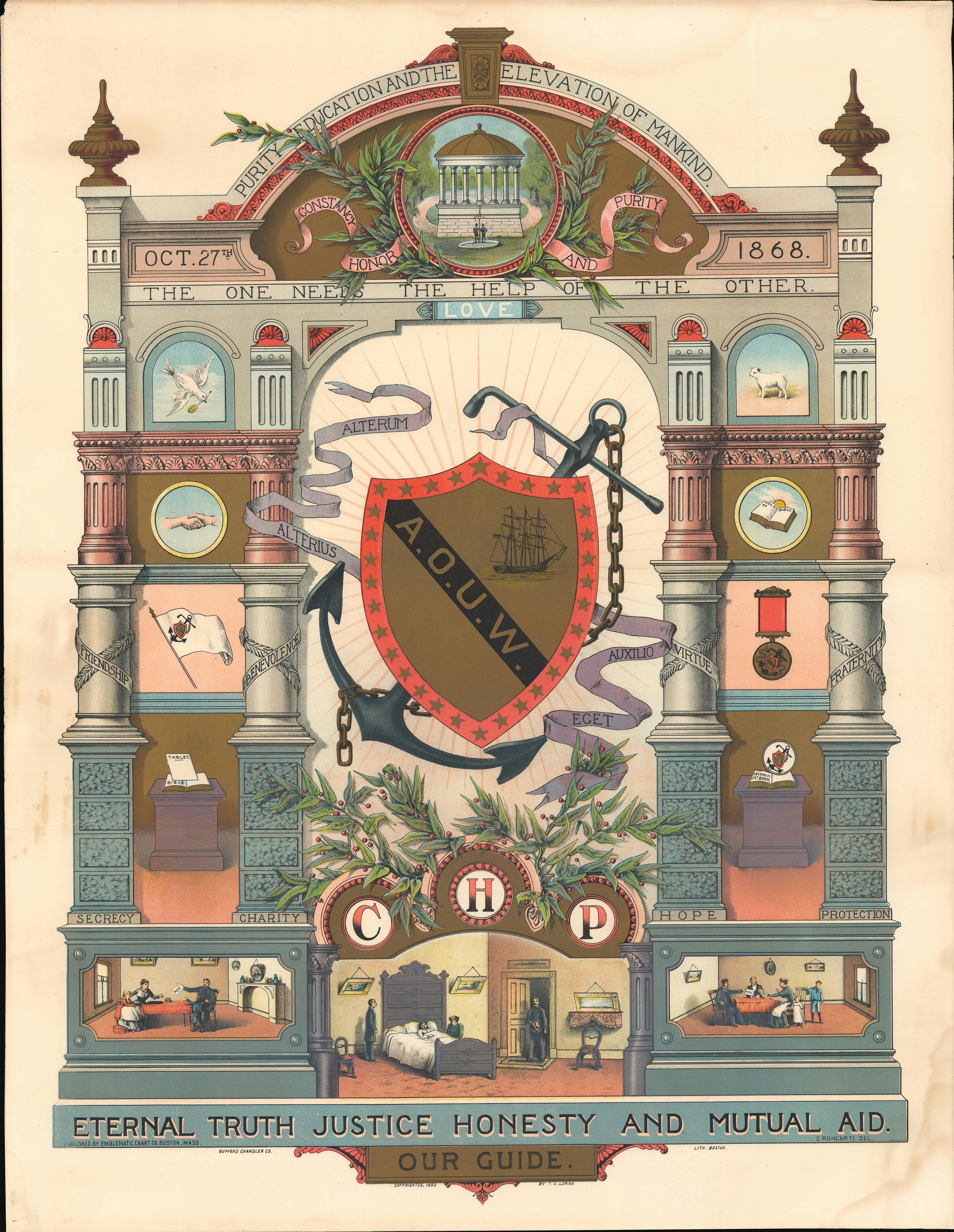
- Founded: October 27, 1868; 157 years ago Meadville, Pennsylvania, US
- Type: Benefit society
- Affiliation: Independent
- Status: Dormant
- Scope: North America
- Motto: "Charity, Hope, and Protection"
- Colors: Red and Blue
- Symbol: All-Seeing Eye, an Anchor, the Bible, and Compasses
- Headquarters: United States

The Ancient Order of United Workmen (AOUW) was a fraternal organization in the United States and Canada, providing mutual social and financial support after the American Civil War. It was the first of the "fraternal benefit societies", organizations that would offer insurance as well as sickness, accident, death and burial policies. It dissolved in 1952.

== History ==
=== Predecessor ===
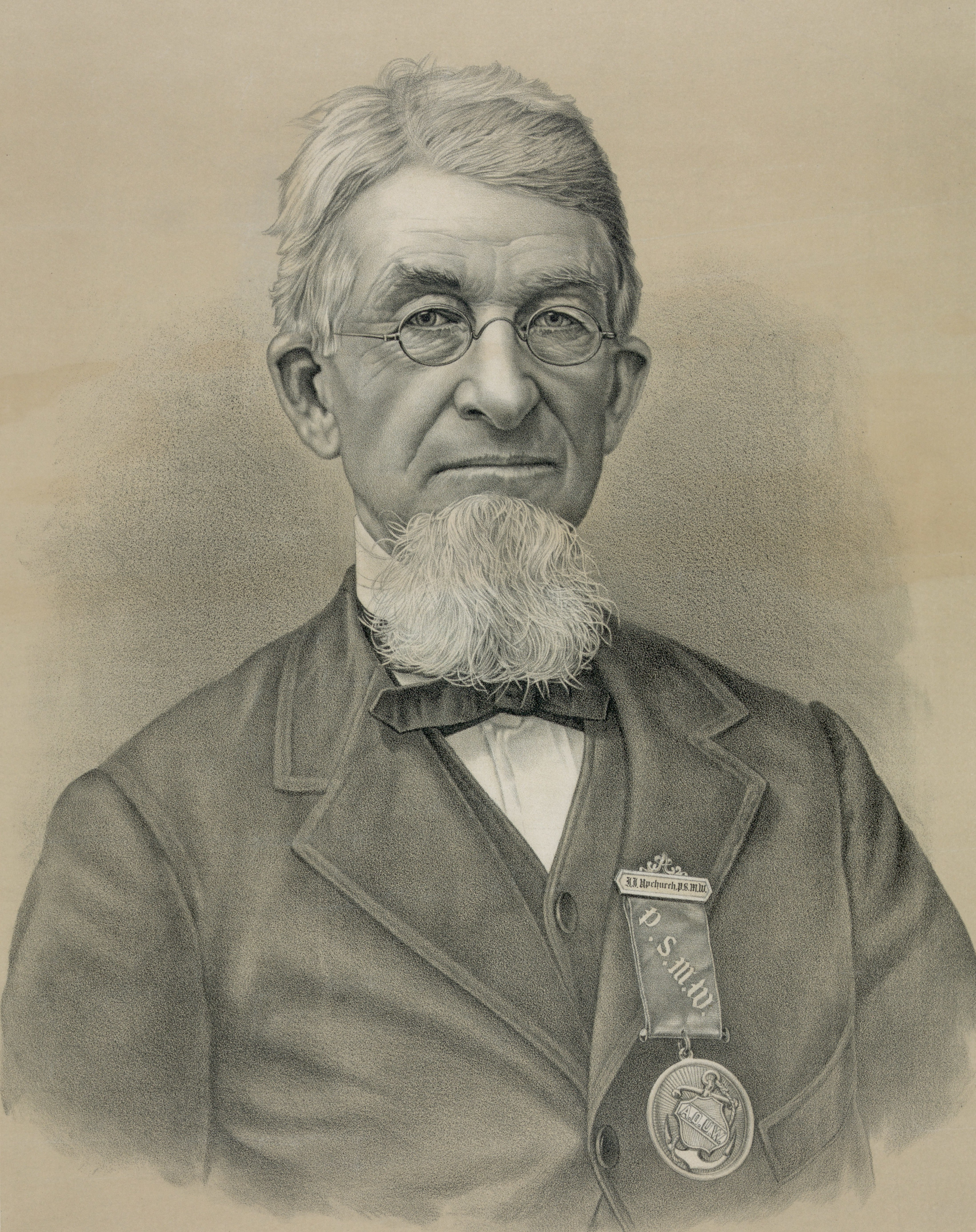
AOUW founder John J. Upchurch

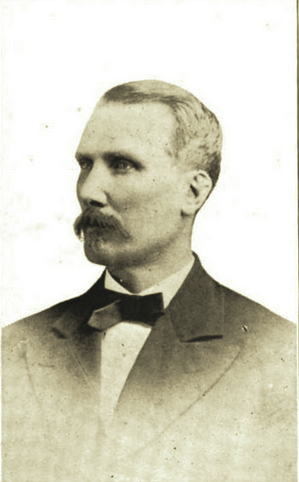
William W. Walker

The order began when John Jordan Upchurch, a mechanic on the Atlantic and Great Western Railroad living in Meadville, Pennsylvania, became dissatisfied with a group he had joined, the League of Friendship, Mechanical Order of the Sun. The latter society had established a lodge, called a subordinate League, in Meadville on April 20, 1868, and its membership was composed almost entirely of mechanics, engineers, firemen and day labors working on the Atlantic and Great Western Railroad and in the local shops.

Upchurch joined the local lodge on June 16, its eighth meeting, and soon rose to become its presiding officer. Another person who would go on to have an important role in the AOUW, William W. Walker, was a charter member. The League of Friendship, Mechanical Order of the Suns avowed purpose was to advance and foster the interests of its members and provide financial assistance on an ad hoc basis. The local lodge was reported to have had a peak membership of about one hundred. Dissension began, apparently, over accusations of improper conduct on part of the Grand Council, the governing body of the League. After the Grand Council ordered a tax from the Meadville League that members thought was inappropriate, many members left. On October 27, 1868, the subordinate League decided to disband.

=== Formation ===
The Ancient Order of United Workmen was formed in Meadville, Pennsylvania on October 27, 1868. Upchurch's original idea was to have an order which would unite the conflicting interests of capital and labor, but it soon became more interested in ameliorating working conditions for its members and establishing an insurance fund. The later became the prime focus after October 6, 1869, when the Provisional Grand Lodge accepted an amendment to the charter suggested by Upchurch to reorganize the insurance fund. Previously the Order would simply pay out $500 on the death of a member to his legal heirs. Upchurch's reform instead required each new member to pay a $1 initiation fee to the insurance fund and granted a $2,000 death benefit. When a member died, the fund would be replenished by a new $1 on each member. Those refusing to pay the assessment, and subordinate lodges which failed to forward the money to an insurance fund within a month were ejected from the order. This system came to be called the post mortem plar or the assessment as needed plan.

Providing insurance for workingmen was a novel idea in the late 1860s. Previously, insurance was usually limited to businessmen and manufacturers. Numerous bankruptcies of commercial life insurance firms and religious objections had also hindered the development of insurance. The AOUW was convinced that their fraternal structure and less expensive overhead costs made them more likely to succeed than commercial life insurance firms.

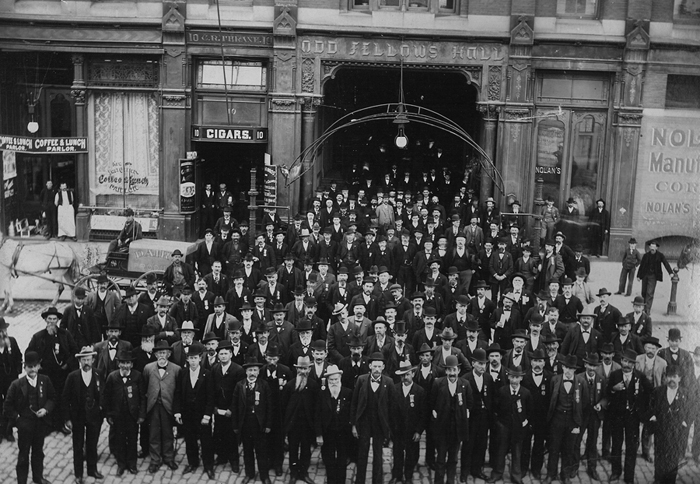
AOUW group in front of an Odd Fellows Hall building in San Francisco

The organization prospered and by 1885 the Order was the largest fraternal benefit group in the United States. By this point many other groups had imitated the fraternal insurance concept. In 1886 the AOUW took the initiative in calling sixteen of these groups together for a conference to discuss their common issues. The result was the National Fraternal Congress, a group that still exists today as the National Fraternal Congress of America.

On August 1, 1893. an amendment to the general laws of the Supreme Lodge said: "Any member of the order who shall after August 1, 1893, enter into any business of selling, by retail, intoxicating liquors as a beverage, shall be expelled from the order." To do so would deprive them of the $2,000 death benefit. Its membership was more than 318,000 in 1895.

The Grand Lodge of Ontario split from its American parent very early, and in 1898, was already holding its 20th annual session. The Grand Lodge of Quebec and Maritime Provinces was separated from the American parent group in 1907 and were soon renamed The Royal Guardians.

=== Dissolution ===
In 1952 the AOUW dissolved and each state affiliate was left to decide its fate. In Massachusetts, the state society merged into the New England Order of Protection. In North Dakota the affiliate became the Pioneer Mutual Life Insurance Company, while in Texas the group simply went into receivership. Only the affiliate in Washington state kept the Order active and under its original name. In 1979 the Washington-based Order had 3,000 members, published a AOUW Emblem and met in a "supreme lodge" biennially.

The Ancient Order of United Workmen of North Dakota evolved into the Pioneer Mutual Life Insurance Company, which was taken over by American United Life Insurance Company and is now part of OneAmerica.

The AOUW also had lodges in Canada set up by John Milne, a banker and mayor of Essex, Ontario. The assets and operations of the Ancient Order of United Workmen of Ontario were acquired by the Independent Order of Foresters in 1926.

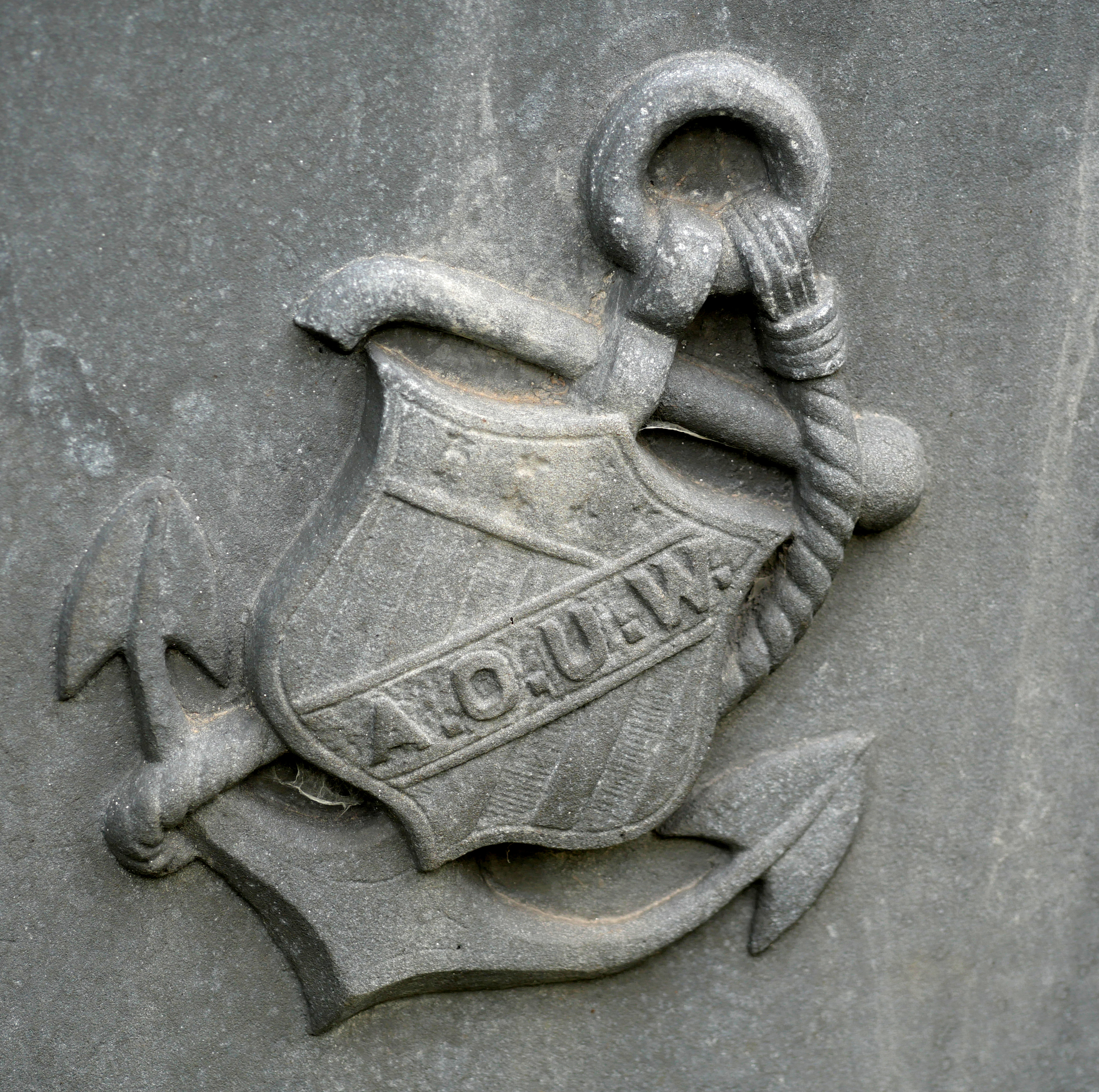
AOUW insignia from a gravestone in Park City, Utah dated 1908

== Symbols ==
Upchurch was a freemason, and incorporated various traditions of freemasonry including local "lodges" (branches), regalia, and initiation ceremonies. The Supreme Lodge structure was abolished in 1929, replaced by a congress.

Its emblems and symbols included the All-Seeing Eye, an Anchor, the Bible, and Compasses. Its motto was "Charity, Hope, and Protection." Its colors were red and blue.

The religious aspects of the Orders ritual was removed in 1932.

== Membership ==
The original constitution of the Ancient Order of United Workmen provided that only white persons were eligible for membership.

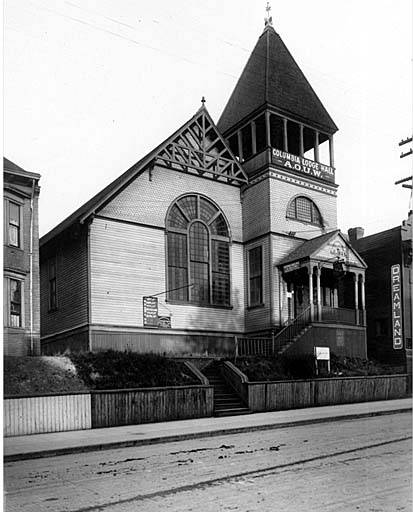
AOUW lodge in a former church, Seattle, 1909

== Lodges ==
Notable buildings (lodges) of the Ancient Order of United Workmen include:

- New Glarus Town Hall, served as an Ancient Order of the United Workmen lodge as well as a town hall and a jail; New Glarus, Wisconsin, 1886
- Ancient Order of United Workmen Temple of Portland, Oregon was completed in 1892 and was demolished in 2017.
- Grand Lodge of North Dakota, Ancient Order of United Workmen, Fargo, North Dakota, 1914
- AOUW built a lodge in 1898 in Antelope, Oregon, which is still occupied.
- AOUW Butler Lodge No. 94, Butler, Pennsylvania

== Auxiliaries and side degrees ==
A female auxiliary, the Degree of Honor, was created at the 1873 convention in Cincinnati. This group created its own Superior Lodge in 1896 and became independent of the AOUW in 1910. There was also a side degree called the Order of Mogullians.

On June 23, 1893 J. Varnum Mott, M.D. founded the Workmen's Benefit Association in Boston. It was limited to members of the AOUW and supplied "additional insurance", including a $1,000 death benefit. There were 5,500 members in the late 1890s.

== See also ==
- List of friendly and benefit societies
