= Jacob Kamm House =

Historic building in Portland, Oregon, U.S.

- U.S. National Register of Historic Places
- Portland Historic Landmark
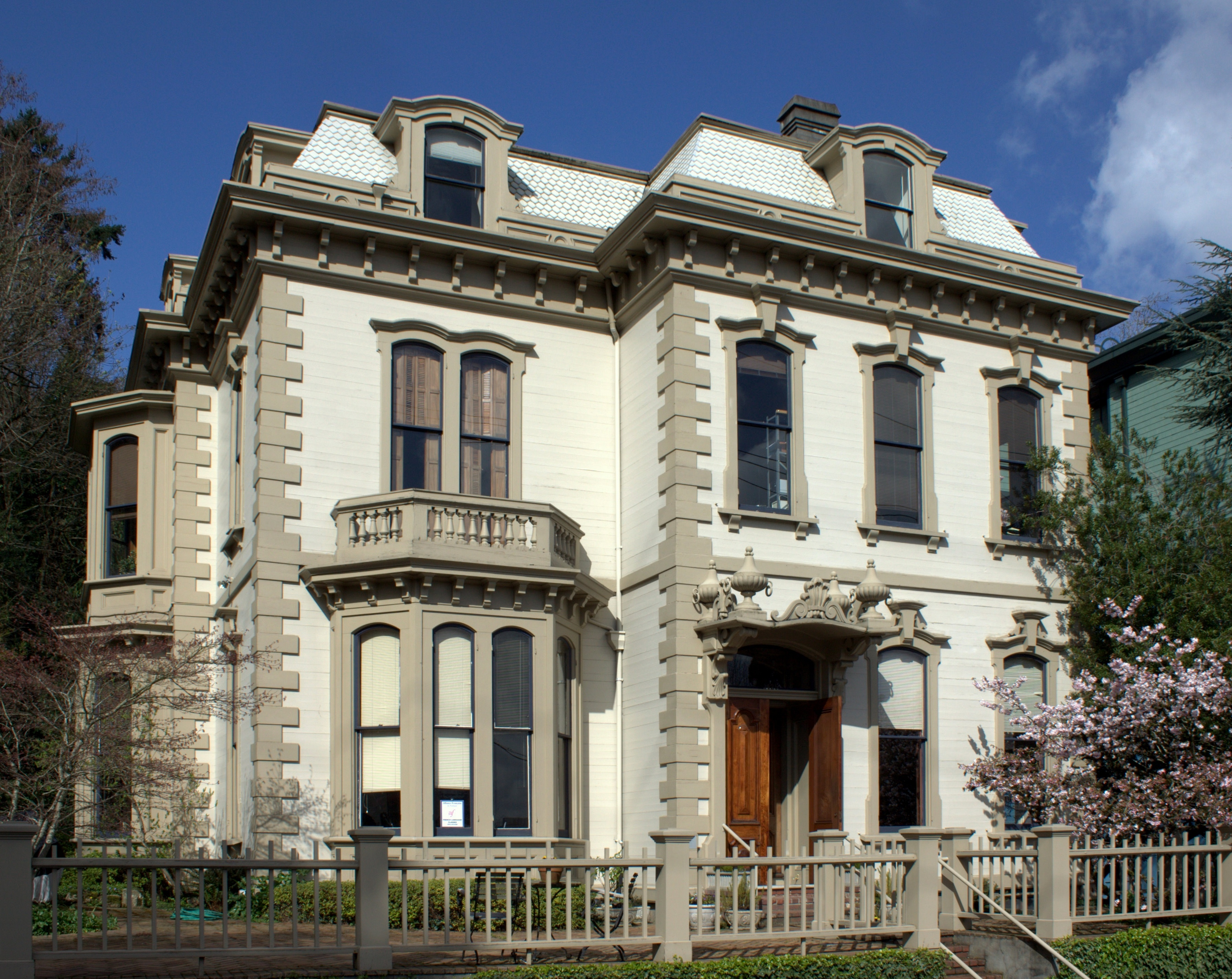
- The Kamm House in 2010.

- Location within Portland, Oregon
- Location: 1425 SW 20th Avenue; Portland, Oregon
- Coordinates: 45°31′04″N 122°41′42″W
- Area: 0.3 acres (0.12 ha)
- Built: 1871
- Architect: Justus F. Krumbein
- Architectural style: French Second Empire
- NRHP reference No.: 74001708
- Added to NRHP: November 5, 1974

The Jacob Kamm House, also called the Jacob Kamm Mansion, is a French Second Empire style mansion in Portland, Oregon, built in 1871. It was moved from its original location on SW 14th and Main to its current location in Goose Hollow in 1950 to make room for Lincoln High School's campus. It was purchased by preservationist Eric Ladd for $1,000 at auction and moved to its present location, along with two other houses Ladd was interested in preserving, at SW 20th and Jefferson, which was called "the colony."

== Design and construction ==
The house, completed in 1871, was designed for Jacob Kamm by architect Elwood M. Burton. The design has many times been erroneously attributed to Justus F. Krumbein, who shared a partnership with Burton at the time of its construction. The construction was overseen by L. Therkelsen, and cost $80,000. While the French Second Empire style building suggests a stone or stucco exterior, it is actually built with flush horizontal siding and wooden quoins. The front facade is composed of two different wings set on different planes. The right wing is three-bayed and contains the canopied entrance. The left contains a polygonal bay and a double, segmental-arched window. Both have a dormer on the mansard roof.

The wooden shingles on the mansard are scalloped to appear like slate. The building is approximately 8,671 square feet (805.6 m^{2}) in three stories plus a basement, and contains six bathrooms. It was sited on Kamm's Goose Hollow 14th and Main 11 acres (4.5 ha) property. The original address to the house was 488 Main Street; the city's streets were renamed in the early 1930s and the location became Southwest 14th and Main.

Notable early features were central heating, using steam from a ship's boiler, and a rudimentary system of air conditioning, using cool air from the basement directed through the house through air pipes and cast iron vents. The air conditioning system was intact, but nonfunctional, as recently as 1974. In the 1970s, the house was remembered by Eric Ladd as being "well back from 14th Avenue", with a large magnolia, a flowering cherry tree, fruit trees, and a "century old black walnut".

== Adventure House/Junior Museum ==
In 1946, a few years before the house was moved, The Oregonian said it "sits aloofly and well back from the fenced off streets", and said it had been continuously occupied, even though Kamm died in 1912 and his wife died in 1932. The Portland Children's Museum began in the house in 1946, then called the "Adventure House", and run by the Portland Parks & Recreation. By 1950, the museum was known as the "Junior Museum", and moved to a location in Lair Hill. The site was loaned to the Parks and Recreation Department from the Portland Public Schools, who already had plans for moving onto the site. By that time, the formerly rural area was "a community thickly populated, with houses and apartments closely spaced." An article in 1950 stated the Junior Museum was "filled with boys and girls who have never climbed a tree before", and that weekly attendance was 400-600.

== 1950 move ==
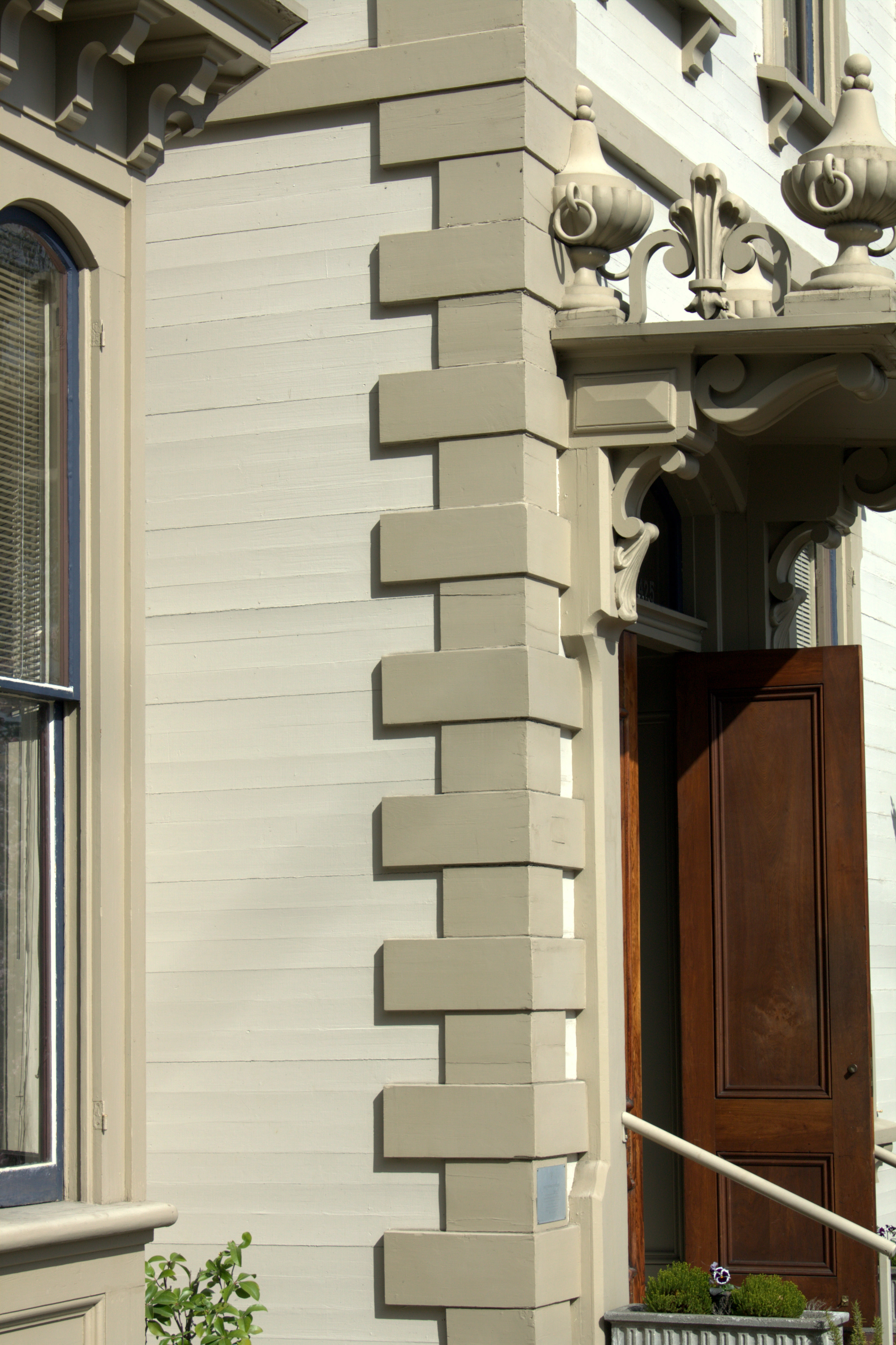
Quoin and horizontal siding detail

In 1950, the house was moved to make room for Lincoln High School, which was moving from its South Park Blocks location, called Old Main. This was the third location for the school, which was the first high school in Portland and only the second in the West. The house was moved a short distance to Salmon and 18th in July 1950 for excavation of the high school and while Eric Ladd secured a final moving site. It was then moved to its 20th Avenue location around December 16, 1950, on wooden rollers, rather than wheels, since it was too heavy. The home was moved partway one day, and then was left standing on the road during a large storm. Since utility works was needed to disconnect and reconnect electrical lines crossing roads, the rest of the journey had to wait while utility crews repaired storm damage elsewhere in the city. The house was described as "barren and austere" by The Oregonian, which also noted its gas and electric chandeliers, decorative plaster wainscoting on the stairway flights, and inlaid hardwoods, though some rooms had been recovered in asphalt floor tiling. The move was coordinated by Allstate Construction.

Two days before demolition on the house was to begin in 1950, Eric Ladd purchased the Kamm house for $1000 to move it to a colony of significant homes, later called the "Old Portland Colony", having three historic homes by 1965. The mansion was moved approximately 0.5 miles (0.80 km) to 1425 SW 20th Avenue on a 10,000 square feet (930 m^{2}) lot. Ladd intended to make it into three apartments, but ran a restaurant known as the Kamm House Restaurant out of it for four years beginning in 1955. A 1955 society page spread in a June 1955 The Oregonian discussed how guests arrived at the home dressed in clothing reminiscent of "the [1880s] when Portland social life saw one of its gayest periods", including arriving by horse and buggy. The restaurant had opened for an Oregon Historical Society benefit and reception for patrons of the society, with dinner being $100 per plate and 80 patrons in attendance. The restaurant could not get a liquor license for the first year. After the first two years, Eric Ladd simplified operations, did all of the baking for the restaurant himself, but still had to close the restaurant after another two years.

Eric Ladd (1921-2000) was called "the idiosyncratic Portlander who was in the forefront of historic preservation" by The Oregonian at his death in 2000. He received an award from the Portland Beautification Association, inscribed "The Tenacious Preservationist". The Old Portland Colony also contained a replica of Abraham Lincoln's Springfield, Kentucky home, built for the 1905 Lewis and Clark Centennial Exposition. The Lincoln home was opened as a museum and a sandwich shop in about 1956, but had a large fire some time later. By 1958, Eric Ladd was distracted by the Pittock Mansion, where he had moved.

== 1960s decline ==
Called an "ailing home" in 1965, the home was "just the skeleton of the home Jacob Kamm built". It contained furnishings from other Portland landmarks. Notably, the "carved oak lobby pilasters", paneling, leaded glass, bottle window, "turkey red and black carpets", bold red drapes, and "ornamental ironwork from the courtyard" came from the Portland Hotel. It also contained "burled ash panelling [sic] from the great hall of the Knapp house", a large Stick-Eastlake style home in Portland's Nob Hill, erected in 1882 and demolished in the 1950s. In 1965, mayor Terry Schrunk and the city council inspected the homes, as Eric Ladd was trying to preserve the homes and raise funds in a manner similar to the fundraiser organized for the Pittock Mansion in 1962. Eric Ladd lived in the home from 1963 until at least 1965. In 1967, the home contained furnishings from John Henry Belter. The house was listed on the National Register of Historic Places on November 5, 1974. A report from 1971 discussed

Upon entering the house, cold chilling air greets you. The sound of dripping water draws attention to the gigantic parlor living room area. The water streams profusely from the ceiling on to the expensive red carpeting. No one has been able to find the leak, so it is left to continue soaking the carpet. There is no container to catch the water.

The Portland Historical Landmarks Commission voted unanimously in June 1982 to recommend to the City Council that the house be made a landmark. Peter Hoffman, owner of the house since 1979, announced the property was for sale at a meeting to make the house a landmark on September 9, 1982. The announcement caught the Landmarks Commission off guard. The home was "still for sale" by October 1982, and was on commercial land, meaning it was not being used for apartments. On November 3, 1982, the Portland City Council voted on whether to make the house a landmark. The owner of the property, Peter Hoffman, originally supported landmark status, but requested it not be made a landmark, as he felt it would impede his efforts to sell the house. The council voted against designating it a landmark, with Frank Ivancie and commissioner Mildred Schwab being the only votes to accept it as a landmark. By October 2009, the home had received Portland Historic Landmark status.

== Current ==
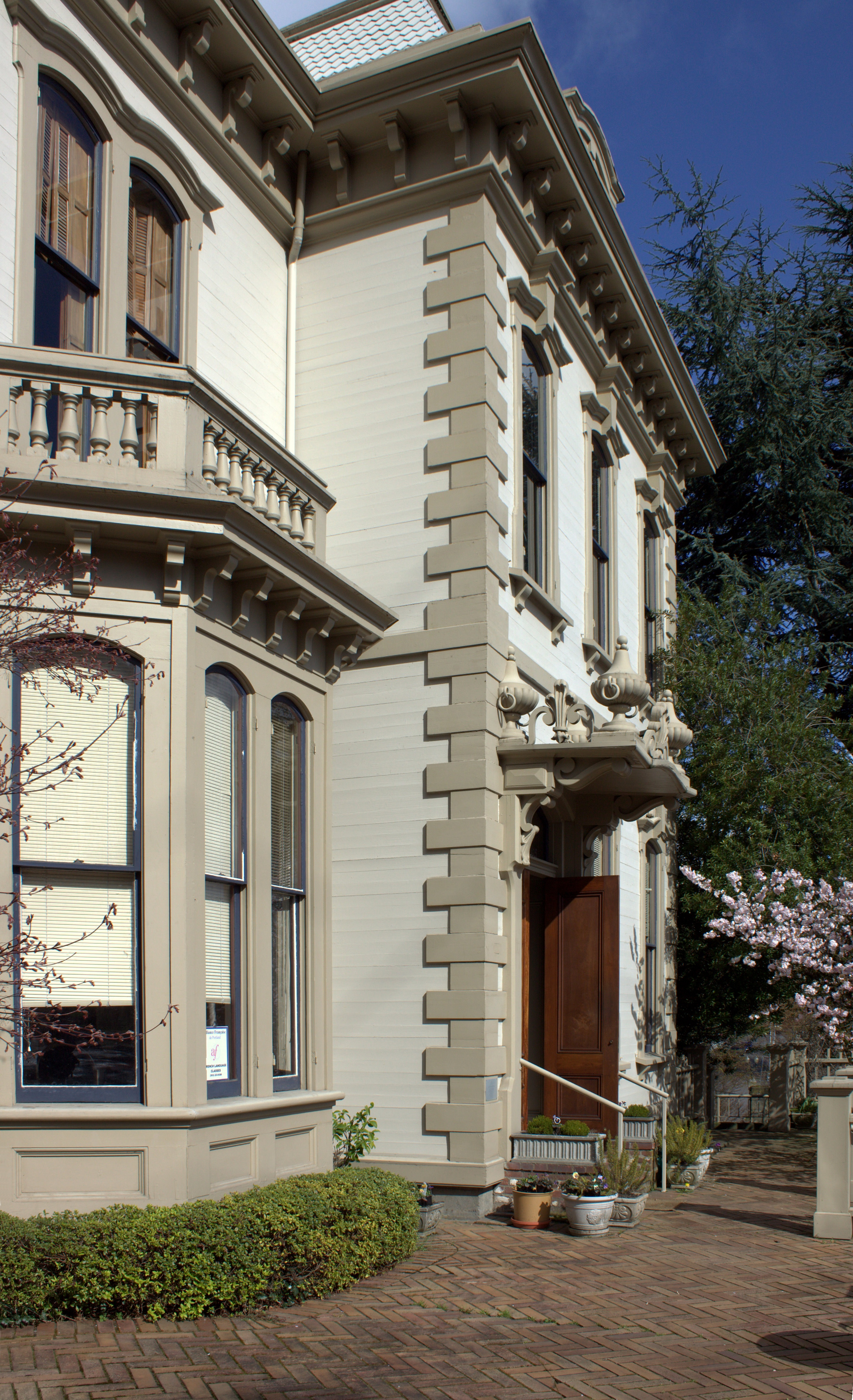

The home was sold to the Kamm House Partnership (William J. Hawkins III, Ron Emmerson) by 1984. It contained both apartments and offices at that time, including a national office for the Sudden Infant Death Syndrome Project.

It is currently home to the Alliance française de Portland, who hosts the annual Bastille Day festival at Director Park.

== Legacy ==
In their survey of classic Portland homes, Hawkins and Willingham stated the home was

Portland's singular remaining great mansion from the decade of the 1870s ... the most proper design in the style.. [it] is handsomely proportioned, clearly imitating stone construction in wood. It has no tower, but the mansard roof is a distinct attribute, probably the closest in design to those in France.

Bart King's An Architectural Guidebook to Portland states

"A somewhat daunting structure, the Jacob Kamm House may qualify as the city's first real mansion. It has dramatic quoined corners, arched and elongated windows with keystones, and expressive baroque dormers in the mansard roof. Alone on a dead-end street, it seems to look reproachfully at an area developed in a hodge-podge manner.
