= Carrington Public Schools =

School system in North Dakota, United States

Location
- Carrington, North Dakota; United States
- Coordinates: 47°26′54″N 99°06′55″W

District information
- Type: Public
- Superintendent: Brian Duchscherer

Students and staff
- Students: 583
- Faculty: 60
- District mascot: Cardinals
- Colors: Red and white

Other information
- Website: www.carrington.k12.nd.us

Carrington Public Schools are a system of a publicly funded schools serving the cities of Carrington, Grace City, Sykeston and Woodworth, and the surrounding rural areas in North Dakota, United States. There is an elementary school and a high school in Carrington. The district administration offices are also in Carrington. The superintendent is Brian Duchscherer.

== Carrington Grade School ==
Carrington Grade School is a public elementary school located in Carrington, and is a part of the Carrington Public Schools system.

=== Information ===
Grades	Pre-6th
Principal	Januita Short
Students	283
Faculty	30

=== History ===
Carrington Grade School uses the historic Lincoln Building for some classes. The Lincoln Building was torn down between June 2008 and July 2008.

== Carrington High School ==
Carrington High School is a public high school located in Carrington. The athletic teams are known as the Cardinals. The school colors are red and white.

=== Information ===
Grades	7-12th
Principal	David Nowatzki
Students	310
Faculty	29

==== Championships ====
North Dakota High School Activities Association championships:

- State Class 'B' boys' basketball: 1995, 2010
- State Class 'B' girls' basketball: 2010, 2011
- State Class 'B' football: 1981, 1988
- State Class 'B' wrestling: 1987, 1988, 1991, 1992, 1994, 1995
- State Class 'B' girls' track and field: 1999, 2000, 2001, 2002, 2003, 2004
- State Class 'B' boys' track and field: 1982

== Notable alumni ==
- Jim Kleinsasser - player for the Minnesota Vikings
- Stephanie Tollefson - Miss North Dakota USA 2008; attended Carrington High School for 10th-12th grade
