= Carrington, North Dakota =

- City
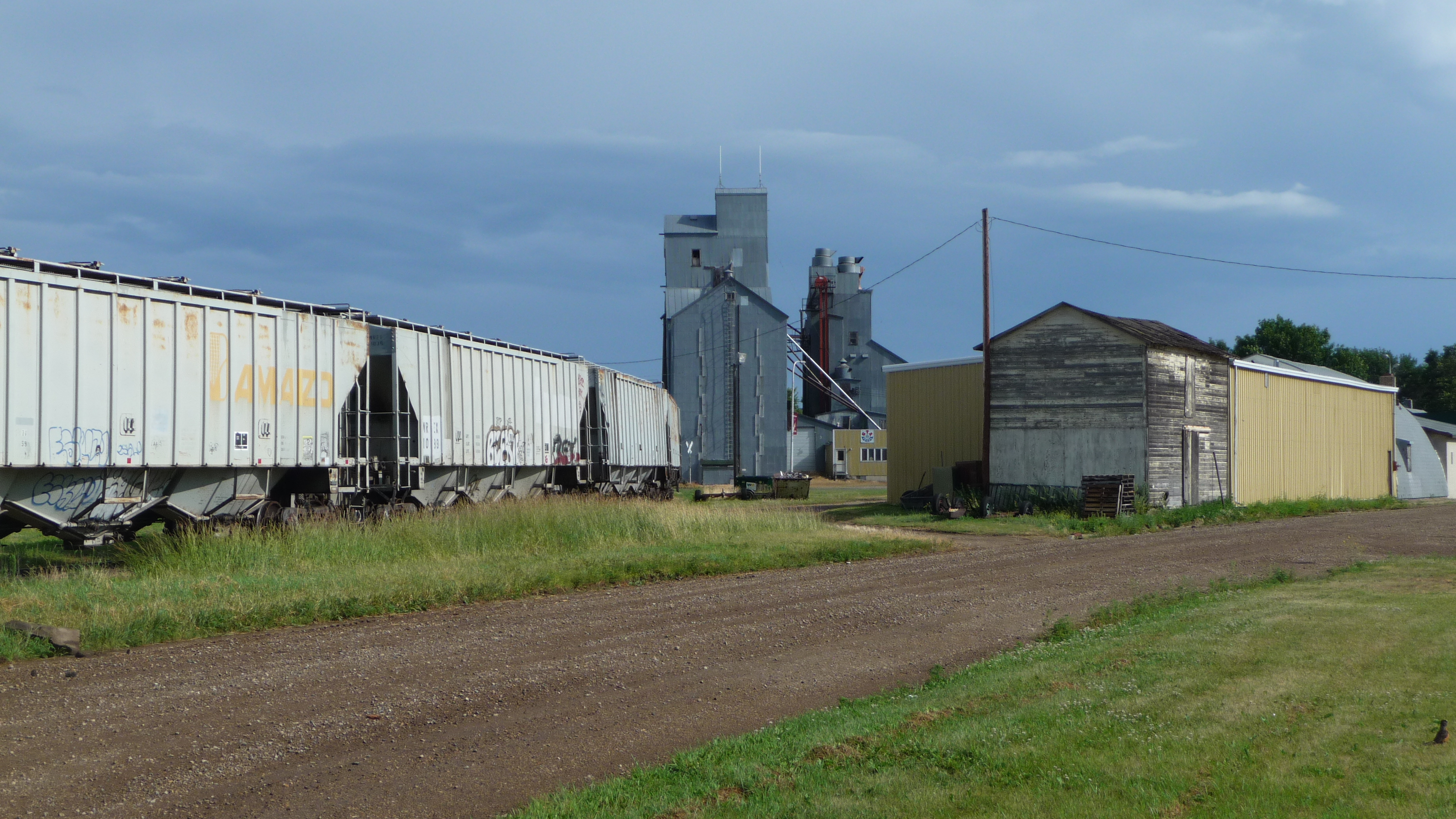
- Grain Elevator in Carrington
- Nickname: Central City
- Interactive map of Carrington, North Dakota
- Location within North Dakota
- Coordinates: 47.4529°N 99.1310°W
- Country: United States
- State: North Dakota
- County: Foster
- Platted: 1882
- Established: 1883
- Incorporated: 1900
- Named for: Miles D. Carrington

Government
  - Type: Mayor–council
  - Mayor: Tom Erdmann
  - Councilmen: Tyler Hoggarth; Troy Roundy; Doug Smith; Trygg Olson; Jesse Nelson; Neil Fandrich

Area
  - City: 2.373 sq mi (6.146 km^{2})
  - Land: 2.371 sq mi (6.141 km^{2})
  - Water: 0.0023 sq mi (0.006 km^{2}) 0.08%
- Elevation: 1,585 ft (483 m)

Population (2020)
  - City: 2,080
  - Estimate (2025): 1,950
  - Density: 877/sq mi (339/km^{2})
  - Metro: 3,212
- Time zone: UTC–6 (Central (CST))
  - Summer (DST): UTC–5 (CDT)
- ZIP Code: 58421
- Area code: 701
- FIPS code: 38-12340
- GNIS feature ID: 1035955
- Highways: US 52, US 281, ND 200
- Website: carringtonnd.com

Carrington is a city in and the county seat of Foster County, North Dakota, United States. A part of Carrington Township and Wyard Township. The population was 2,080 as of the 2020 census, and was estimated at 1,950 in 2025. Carrington is home to Dakota Growers Pasta Company, Inc.

== History ==
Carrington was platted in 1882 by Miles D. Carrington and named for him. Carrington has been the county seat since 1883. A post office has been in operation at Carrington since 1883.

== Geography ==
According to the United States Census Bureau, the city has an area of 2.373 square miles (6.15 km^{2}), of which 2.371 square miles (6.14 km^{2}) is land and 0.002 square miles (0.01 km^{2}) (0.08%) is water.

== Climate ==
This climatic region is typified by large seasonal temperature differences, with warm to hot (and often humid) summers and cold (sometimes severely cold) winters. According to the Köppen Climate Classification system, Carrington has a humid continental climate, abbreviated "Dfb" on climate maps.

Climate data for Carrington 4 N, North Dakota (1991–2020 normals, extremes 1967–present)
| Month | Jan | Feb | Mar | Apr | May | Jun | Jul | Aug | Sep | Oct | Nov | Dec | Year |
|---|---|---|---|---|---|---|---|---|---|---|---|---|---|
| Record high °F (°C) | 55 (13) | 58 (14) | 76 (24) | 99 (37) | 97 (36) | 103 (39) | 107 (42) | 107 (42) | 105 (41) | 92 (33) | 78 (26) | 61 (16) | 107 (42) |
| Mean daily maximum °F (°C) | 18.3 (−7.6) | 23.1 (−4.9) | 35.8 (2.1) | 53.2 (11.8) | 67.2 (19.6) | 76.4 (24.7) | 81.7 (27.6) | 80.7 (27.1) | 71.8 (22.1) | 55.2 (12.9) | 37.1 (2.8) | 22.8 (−5.1) | 51.9 (11.1) |
| Daily mean °F (°C) | 8.4 (−13.1) | 12.6 (−10.8) | 25.6 (−3.6) | 41.0 (5.0) | 54.6 (12.6) | 64.8 (18.2) | 69.5 (20.8) | 67.5 (19.7) | 58.5 (14.7) | 43.6 (6.4) | 27.5 (−2.5) | 13.9 (−10.1) | 40.6 (4.8) |
| Mean daily minimum °F (°C) | −1.5 (−18.6) | 2.1 (−16.6) | 15.3 (−9.3) | 28.7 (−1.8) | 41.9 (5.5) | 53.3 (11.8) | 57.3 (14.1) | 54.4 (12.4) | 45.3 (7.4) | 31.9 (−0.1) | 17.9 (−7.8) | 5.0 (−15.0) | 29.3 (−1.5) |
| Record low °F (°C) | −38 (−39) | −39 (−39) | −26 (−32) | −12 (−24) | 14 (−10) | 29 (−2) | 34 (1) | 28 (−2) | 15 (−9) | −3 (−19) | −27 (−33) | −37 (−38) | −39 (−39) |
| Average precipitation inches (mm) | 0.53 (13) | 0.42 (11) | 0.75 (19) | 1.25 (32) | 2.76 (70) | 3.78 (96) | 3.60 (91) | 2.33 (59) | 1.97 (50) | 1.90 (48) | 0.67 (17) | 0.81 (21) | 20.77 (528) |
| Average precipitation days (≥ 0.01 in) | 5.0 | 5.2 | 4.5 | 6.0 | 9.7 | 10.3 | 9.3 | 7.7 | 6.1 | 6.7 | 4.5 | 5.8 | 80.8 |
Source: NOAA

== Demographics ==
Historical population
| Census | Pop. | Note | %± |
|---|---|---|---|
| 1910 | 1,217 | | — |
| 1920 | 1,420 | | 16.7% |
| 1930 | 1,717 | | 20.9% |
| 1940 | 1,850 | | 7.7% |
| 1950 | 2,101 | | 13.6% |
| 1960 | 2,438 | | 16.0% |
| 1970 | 2,491 | | 2.2% |
| 1980 | 2,641 | | 6.0% |
| 1990 | 2,267 | | −14.2% |
| 2000 | 2,268 | | 0.0% |
| 2010 | 2,065 | | −9.0% |
| 2020 | 2,080 | | 0.7% |
| 2025 (est.) | 1,950 | | −6.2% |
U.S. Decennial Census; 2020 Census

According to realtor website Zillow, the average price of a home as of June 30, 2026, in Carrington was $199,307.

As of the 2024 American Community Survey, there were 971 estimated households in Carrington with an average of 2.14 persons per household. The city has a median household income of $77,171. Approximately 9.7% of the city's population lives at or below the poverty line. Carrington has an estimated 68.4% employment rate, with 32.2% of the population holding a bachelor's degree or higher and 92.4% holding a high school diploma. There were 1,055 housing units at an average density of 444.96 per square mile (171.8/km^{2}).

The top five reported languages (people were allowed to report up to two languages, thus the figures will generally add to more than 100%) were English (96.1%), Spanish (1.1%), Indo-European (2.8%), Asian and Pacific Islander (0.0%), and Other (0.0%).

The median age in the city was 40.5 years.

Carrington, North Dakota – racial and ethnic composition Note: the US Census treats Hispanic/Latino as an ethnic category. This table excludes Latinos from the racial categories and assigns them to a separate category. Hispanics/Latinos may be of any race.
| Race / ethnicity (NH = non-Hispanic) | Pop. 1980 | Pop. 1990 | Pop. 2000 | Pop. 2010 | Pop. 2020 |
|---|---|---|---|---|---|
| White alone (NH) | 2,607 (98.71%) | 2,242 (98.90%) | 2,237 (98.63%) | 2,015 (97.58%) | 1,927 (92.64%) |
| Black or African American alone (NH) | 0 (0.00%) | 0 (0.00%) | 4 (0.18%) | 3 (0.15%) | 7 (0.34%) |
| Native American or Alaska Native alone (NH) | 7 (0.27%) | 13 (0.57%) | 11 (0.49%) | 15 (0.73%) | 16 (0.77%) |
| Asian alone (NH) | 0 (0.00%) | 2 (0.09%) | 0 (0.00%) | 3 (0.15%) | 13 (0.63%) |
| Pacific Islander alone (NH) | — | — | 0 (0.00%) | 0 (0.00%) | 0 (0.00%) |
| Other race alone (NH) | 0 (0.00%) | 0 (0.00%) | 1 (0.04%) | 0 (0.00%) | 6 (0.29%) |
| Mixed race or multiracial (NH) | — | — | 10 (0.44%) | 15 (0.73%) | 67 (3.22%) |
| Hispanic or Latino (any race) | 0 (0.00%) | 10 (0.44%) | 5 (0.22%) | 14 (0.68%) | 44 (2.12%) |
| Total | 2,641 (100.00%) | 2,267 (100.00%) | 2,268 (100.00%) | 2,065 (100.00%) | 2,080 (100.00%) |

=== 2020 census ===
As of the 2020 census, there were 2,080 people, 923 households, and 515 families residing in the city. The population density was 877.27 inhabitants per square mile (338.7/km^{2}). There were 1,072 housing units at an average density of 452.13 per square mile (174.6/km^{2}). The racial makeup of the city was 93.13% White, 0.38% African American, 0.87% Native American, 0.63% Asian, 0.00% Pacific Islander, 0.91% from some other races, and 4.09% from two or more races. Hispanic or Latino people of any race were 2.12% of the population.

There were 923 households out of which 23.0% had children under the age of 18 living with them, 44.6% were married couples living together, 25.9% had a female householder with no husband present, and _% were non-families. 39.6% of all households were made up of individuals and 15.5% had someone living alone who was 65 years of age or older. The average household size was 2._ and the average family size was 2._.

In the city the population was spread out with _% were under 5 years of age, 21.9% under the age of 18, _% from 18 to 24, _% from 25 to 44, _% from 45 to 64, and 21.7% who were 65 years of age or older. The median age was 44.7 years. For every 100 females there were 96.2 males. For every 100 females age 18 and over, there were 96.1 males.

The median income for a household in the city was $_, and the median income for a family was $_. Males had a median income of $_ versus $_ for females. The per capita income for the city was $_. _% of the population and _% of families were below the poverty line. Out of the total people living in poverty, _% were under the age of 18 and _% were 65 or older.

0.0% of residents lived in urban areas, while 100.0% lived in rural areas.

23.6% were households with a male householder and no spouse or partner present.

There were 1,072 housing units, of which 13.9% were vacant. The homeowner vacancy rate was 1.4% and the rental vacancy rate was 17.8%.

=== 2010 census ===
As of the 2010 census, there were 2,065 people, 951 households, and 540 families residing in the city. The population density was 978.21 inhabitants per square mile (377.7/km^{2}). There were 1,057 housing units at an average density of 500.71 per square mile (193.3/km^{2}). The racial makeup of the city was 98.06% White, 0.15% African American, 0.73% Native American, 0.15% Asian, 0.00 Pacific Islander, 0.10% from some other races, and 0.82% from two or more races. Hispanic or Latino people of any race were 0.68% of the population.

There were 951 households, of which 22.5% had children under the age of 18 living with them, 47.3% were married couples living together, 6.3% had a female householder with no husband present, 3.2% had a male householder with no wife present, and 43.2% were non-families. 38.5% of all households were made up of individuals, and 19.5% had someone living alone who was 65 years of age or older. The average household size was 2.11 and the average family size was 2.81.

The median age in the city was 46 years. 21.7% of residents were under the age of 18; 6.2% were between the ages of 18 and 24; 20.7% were from 25 to 44; 26.8% were from 45 to 64; and 24.8% were 65 years of age or older. The gender makeup of the city was 48.2% male and 51.8% female.

=== 2000 census ===
As of the 2000 census, there were 2,268 people, 961 households, and 594 families residing in the city. The population density was 1,531.91 inhabitants per square mile (591.5/km^{2}). There were 1,057 housing units at an average density of 713.95 per square mile (275.7/km^{2}). The racial makeup of the city was 98.81% White, 0.18% African American, 0.49% Native American, 0.00% Asian, 0.00% Pacific Islander, 0.09% from some other races, and 0.44% from two or more races. Hispanic or Latino people of any race were 0.22% of the population.

There were 961 households, out of which 31.0% had children under the age of 18 living with them, 50.8% were married couples living together, 8.4% had a female householder with no husband present, and 38.1% were non-families. 35.6% of all households were made up of individuals, and 18.3% had someone living alone who was 65 years of age or older. The average household size was 2.27 and the average family size was 2.97.

In the city, the population was spread out, with 25.4% under the age of 18, 6.0% from 18 to 24, 26.8% from 25 to 44, 18.7% from 45 to 64, and 23.1% who were 65 years of age or older. The median age was 40 years. For every 100 females, there were 90.6 males. For every 100 females age 18 and over, there were 87.3 males.

The median income for a household in the city was $31,197, and the median income for a family was $41,654. Males had a median income of $31,250 versus $19,722 for females. The per capita income for the city was $19,012. About 7.0% of families and 8.9% of the population were below the poverty line, including 10.8% of those under age 18 and 11.0% of those age 65 or over.

== Local media ==
=== Print ===
- Foster County Independent

==== AM Radio ====
AM radio stations
| Frequency | Call sign | Name | Format | Owner | City |
|---|---|---|---|---|---|
| 1600 AM | KDAK | Dakota Country Radio | Full service/Country | Ingstad Family Media | Carrington |

=== Television ===
Midcontinent Communications provides cable service to the city of Carrington and New Rockford. Dakota Central Telecommunications provides cable service to Carrington, Jamestown, and other nearby communities.

== Education ==
Carrington is served by the Carrington Public Schools. It operates the Carrington School. In the 2025-26 academic year, the district reported a total of 604 students. The system operates Carrington Elementary School and Carrington High School. Prairie View Adventist School is also in Carrington.

== Transportation ==
Two federal highways pass through Carrington. U.S. 281 runs north to south through the area. U.S. 52 runs east and west, co-signed with ND 200 and to U.S. 281, then runs northwest and southeast route. ND 200 runs east and west through the area.

Highways that run through Carrington include U.S. 52, U.S. 281, ND 200 and Foster County CR 1605. The city is also served by both the Canadian Pacific Railway and the Red River Valley and Western Railroad.

=== Major roads and streets ===
==== North and south ====
- 4th Avenue U.S. Route 281 (City Park, Crossroads Golf Course, residential, commercial, industrial)
- 11th Avenue (North of Main Street) (residential, commercial, industrial)
- 13th Avenue (South of Main Street) (residential, industrial)
- 14th Avenue (South of Main Street) (residential, industrial)
- 66th Avenue SE 19th Avenue (Old Hwy 281) (Foster County Fairgrounds, industrial)

==== East and west ====
- 11th Street North (Dakota Growers, industrial)
- Highway 200 Carrington Airport, residential, commercial, industrial)
- Main Street (Carrington High School, residential, central business district, commercial, industrial)
- 3rd Street South (City Park, Stadium of 76, Foster County Fairgrounds, residential)
- 7th Street South (residential, industrial)

== Notable people ==
- Laura J. Eisenhuth, North Dakota Superintendent of Public Instruction, 1893–1894; first woman elected to statewide office in the United States
- Clinton J. Hall, lawyer and Minnesota state representative
- Jim Kleinsasser, tight end for the Minnesota Vikings
- Larry Woiwode, author and North Dakota poet laureate
