= Justus F. Krumbein =

American architect

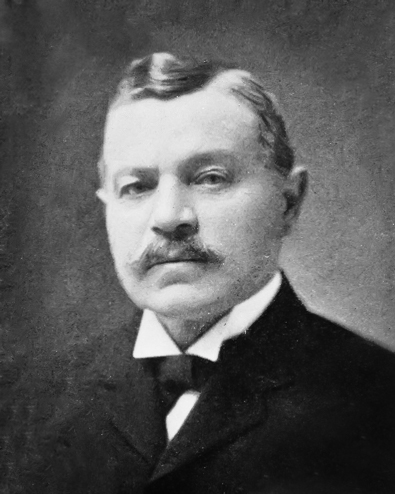
- Born: 1847; Hamburg, Germany
- Died: November 1907 (aged 59–60); Portland, Oregon
- Education: Leibniz University Hannover
- Occupation: Architect
- Spouse: Christine M. Gantenbein (1883–1907; his death)
- Children: Herbert, Waldo
- Practice: Burton and Krumbein; Gilbert and Krumbein; Williams and Krumbein; Justus Krumbein
- Buildings: Oregon State Capitol Building (burned in 1935); Bickel Block; Ancient Order of United Workmen Temple
- Design: Italianate cast-iron architecture

Justus F. Krumbein (1847 – November 1907) was an architect based in Portland, Oregon, United States, whose work included Richardsonian Romanesque designs and Italianate, cast-iron architecture. Little of his work survived the 20th Century.

== Early life and education ==
Krumbein was born in 1847 near Hamburg, Germany. At the age of 15, he became a student of architecture at the Hannover Polytechnic School, and he graduated with honors in 1867.

He returned to Hamburg and worked as an architectural drafter for two years, then in 1869 he immigrated to the United States under the name Fritz Krumbein.

== Career ==
Krumbein arrived in San Francisco on July 9, 1869, and he worked in architectural firms until 1871. In that year he moved to Portland and formed a partnership with contractor Elwood M. Burton. Soon thereafter he formed a partnership with W. G. Gilbert.

=== Gilbert and Krumbein ===
During his partnership with Gilbert, Krumbein designed the 1871 Jacob Kamm House.

Gilbert and Krumbein were selected in 1872 to design the Oregon State Capitol Building in Salem. The building featured cast-iron ornamentation over brick and limestone, and construction required 400 masons. Total cost was less than $200,000. When construction was completed in 1876, Krumbein was forced to petition the Oregon legislature for remittance of his unpaid fees in the amount of $733.80. The building burned in 1935 and was replaced in 1936.

=== Williams and Krumbein ===
The firm Gilbert and Krumbein dissolved soon after the Oregon State Capitol Building award, and in 1874 Krumbein formed a new partnership with Warren Heywood Williams. The partnership lasted until 1878, and in at least one case the design credit between the two partners would later be in dispute.

Williams and Krumbein designed the First Presbyterian Church of Seattle in 1876, later demolished. The architects also have been credited with designing the Fechheimer & White Building, although the building was constructed after the partnership ended.

In characterizing the differences between Williams and Krumbein, architectural historian William J. Hawkins observed, "Of the two major architects of the cast-iron era in Portland, Warren H. Williams and Justus Krumbein, the latter probably left the more exuberant legacy. While Williams' work displayed the elegance and refinement for which Victorian Portland was famous, Krumbein's work often veered toward the spectacular."

=== Other projects ===
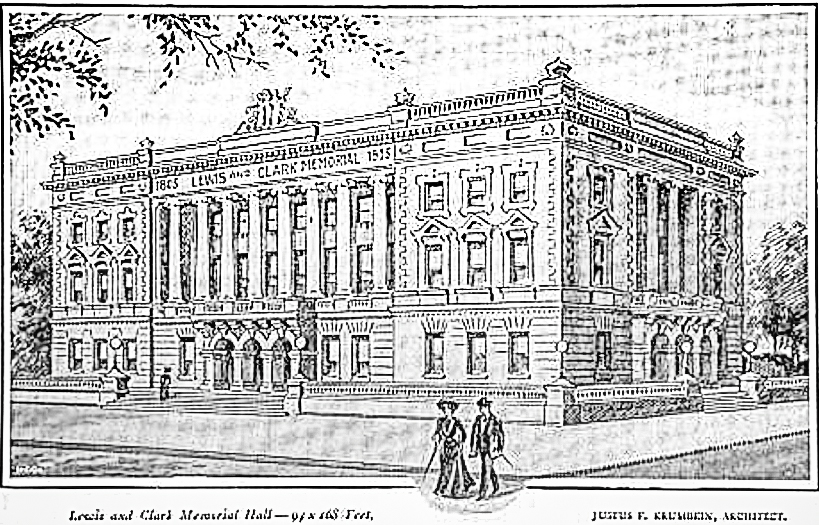
A 1905 engraving of Lewis and Clark Memorial Hall, designed by Justus F. Krumbein

After his work with Williams ended, Krumbein continued in business without a partner. He designed the Couch and Failing Schools (both demolished) for Portland Public Schools in the early 1880s.

In 1892 Krumbein designed the Ancient Order of United Workmen Temple at SW Second and Taylor Street in downtown Portland. The Richardsonian Romanesque building has been described as "brooding" and "foreboding." Although attributed to Krumbein, the building may have been designed by his drafter, Lionel Deane.

The Bickel Block at NW First and Couch Street was constructed in 1883 and became part of the Portland campus of the University of Oregon, known as the White Stag Block, in 2006. The Bickel building features Italianate, cast-iron architecture.

In 1884 Krumbein designed the Kamm Block, a building that has been described as one of Portland's most decorative and palatial. After fire destroyed parts of the building in 1892 and again in 1939, it was demolished in 1948.

Krumbein was one of seven architects chosen to design exhibition halls for the 1905 Lewis and Clark Centennial Exposition.

After a brief illness, Krumbein died in 1907 at the age of 60.

== See also ==
- Architecture of Portland, Oregon
