= American Fraternal Alliance =

American trade association of fraternities

- Founded: 1913; 113 years ago Chicago, Illinois, US
- Type: Umbrella
- Affiliation: Independent
- Status: Active
- Scope: North America
- Publication: Fraternal Monitor
- Chapters: 57 organizations
- Former name: National Fraternal Congress of America
- Headquarters: PO Box 68700; Indianapolis, Indiana 46268-0700; United States
- Website: www.fraternalalliance.org

The American Fraternal Alliance (AFA) is an umbrella group of fraternal orders in the United States. It was founded as the National Fraternal Congress of America in 1913, in Chicago, Illinois. It adopted its current name in 2011.

== History ==
The origins of the AFA go back to November 17, 1886, when a congress of sixteen fraternal orders representing 535,000 members met in Washington, DC. The original meeting was called by the Ancient Order of United Workmen, the pioneer fraternal insurance society, to establish uniform insurance legislation in all states. The 1913 meeting in Chicago resulted in the formation of a permanent organization, the National Fraternal Congress (NFC).

On March 21, 1901, several fraternal orders created the rival Associated Fraternities of America in Chicago. It was created "as a protest against the workings" of the NFC. The two groups re-merged in 1913 as the National Fraternal Congress of America.

Another group the competed with the NFC for a time was the American Fraternal Congress, which was organized in Omaha, Nebraska, in 1898. This group differed from the NFC in that it only allowed orders that had adopted the legal reserve system to be members.

The NFC adopted a Uniform Bill for state insurance regulations in 1893. In 1910, with the assistance of the National Association of Insurance Commissioners – it promulgated the Mobile bill, which was modified in 1912 as the New York Conference bill. It also created a mortality table in 1899.

It became the American Fraternal Alliance in 2011. Its headquarters are in Indianapolis, Indiana.

== Publications ==
The NFC published a magazine, Fraternal Monitor and an annual Statistics, Fraternal Societies.

== Membership ==
The current members of the AFA include:

- 1891 Financial Life (National Catholic Society of Foresters)
- Alliance of Transylvanian Saxons
- American Mutual Life Association
- Assured Life Association (formerly Woodman of the World)
- BetterLife (merger of members National Mutual Benefit and Western Fraternal Life Association)
- Catholic Association of Foresters
- Catholic Financial Life
- CLC Life Insurance / Catholic Ladies of Columbia
- Catholic Life Insurance
- Catholic Order of Foresters
- KJT - Catholic Union of Texas
- Catholic United Financial
- Croatian Fraternal Union of America
- CSA Fraternal Life
- Employes Mutual Benefit Association
- Everence Association, Inc.
- FCSLA Life (First Catholic Slovak Ladies Association of the USA)
- First Catholic Slovak Union
- Foresters Financial
- GBU Life
- Gleaner Life Insurance Society
- Greek Catholic Union of the USA (GCU)
- Hermann Sons Life
- KJZT Family Life
- Knights of Columbus
- KSKJ Life (American Slovenian Catholic Union)
- LPSCU Life (Ladies Pennsylvania Slovak Catholic Union)
- LCBA (Loyal Christian Benefit Association)
- Luso-American Financial
- Modern Woodmen of America
- NSS Life – National Slovak Society
- Police and Firemen’s Insurance Association
- Polish Falcons of America
- Polish National Alliance
- Polish Roman Catholic Union of Americad
- Portuguese Fraternal Society of America
- Providence Association of Ukrainian Catholics in America
- Royal Arcanum
- Royal Neighbors of America
- RBO - Russian Brotherhood Organization
- Serenia Life Financial
- Slovak Catholic Sokol
- Slovene National Benefit Society (SNPJ)
- Sons of Norway
- SPJST
- Teachers Life
- Thrivent
- Ukrainian National Association
- United Transportation Union Insurance Association (UTUIA)
- Western Catholic Union
- Woman’s Life Insurance Society
- WoodmenLife
- WSA Fraternal Life

=== Former members ===
Former members of the AFA include:

- ACTRA Fraternal Benefit Society
- Baptist Life Association
- Catholic Family Fraternal of the State of Texas (KJZT)
- Catholic Holy Family Society
- Degree of Honor Protective Association
- Grand Court Order of Calanthe
- Grand Orange Lodge of British America Benefit Fund
- Knights of Peter Claver, Inc.
- Order of the Sons of Hermann in the State of Texas
- Order of United Commercial Travelers of America
- Polish National Union of America
- Polish Union of the United States of North America
- Serb National Federation
- Slovak Gymnastic Union Sokol of the USA
- Sons of Poland
- Sons of Scotland Benevolent Association
- Toronto Police Widows and Orphans Fund
- Ukrainian Fraternal Society of Canada

== See also ==
- Canadian Fraternal Association
