= List of ethnic organizations in the United States =

This is a list of ethnic organizations in the United States.

== African-American ==
- National Association for the Advancement of Colored People (NAACP)
- National Pan-Hellenic Council (NPHC) and its historically black member fraternities and sororities
- Ugandan North American Association (UNAA)

=== Sudanese-American ===
- U.Sudan Peace & Development Foundation

== Arab-American ==
- Arab American Institute
- American-Arab Anti-Discrimination Committee
- Network of Arab-American Professionals

== Asian-American ==
- National Council of Asian Pacific Americans

=== Chinese-American ===
- Organization of Chinese Americans

=== Japanese-American ===
- Japanese American Citizens League
- Japanese American National Museum

== European-American ==
=== Baltic-American ===
- Joint Baltic American National Committee

==== Estonian-American ====
- Estonian American National Council (EANC)

==== Latvian-American ====
- American Latvian Association (ALA)

=== Czech-American ===
- American Czech and Slovak Association

=== French-American ===
- French-American Foundation

=== Greek-American ===
- American Hellenic Educational Progressive Association
- American Hellenic Institute Public Affairs Committee

=== Irish-American ===
- Ancient Order of Hibernians (Irish Catholic fraternal group)
- Emerald Society
- Friendly Sons of St. Patrick
- Friendly Sons of the Shillelagh

=== Italian-American ===
- Order Sons of Italy in America
- National Italian American Sports Hall of Fame
- National Italian American Foundation
- National Organization of Italian American Women

=== Macedonian-American ===
- Macedonian Patriotic Organization

=== Polish-American ===
- Adam Mickiewicz Library and Dramatic Circle
- American Council for Polish Culture
- Copernicus Foundation
- National Polish-American Sports Hall of Fame
- Polish American Association
- Polish American Congress
- Polish Roman Catholic Union of America
- Polish Women's Alliance
- Sons of Poland

=== Scandinavian-American ===
- The American-Scandinavian Foundation

==== Swedish-American ====
- American Swedish Historical Museum
- American Swedish Institute
- Vasa Order of America

==== Norwegian-American ====
- Independent Order of Vikings
- Norwegian-American Genealogical Center & Naeseth Library
- Norwegian-American Historical Association
- Sons of Norway
- Vesterheim Norwegian-American Museum

=== Slovak Americans ===
- American Czech and Slovak Association

=== Slovene-American ===
- Progressive Slovene Women of America
- Slovene National Benefit Society
- Slovene National Benefit Society (SNPJ)
- Slovenian Women's Union of America
- Western Slavonic Association

== Hispanic and Latino Americans ==
- American Society of Hispanic Economists
- Association of Hispanic Arts (AHA)
- Association of Latino Professionals in Finance and Accounting
- Association of Naval Services Officers
- Hispanic National Bar Association
- Hispanic Organization of Latin Actors
- League of United Latin American Citizens (LULAC)
- National Association of Hispanic Journalists
- National Association of Latino Elected and Appointed Officials
- National Society for Hispanic Professionals
- National Society of Hispanic Physicists
- Society of Hispanic Professional Engineers

=== Cuban-American ===
- Cuban American National Foundation

=== Mexican-American ===
- Mexican American Legal Defense and Educational Fund (MALDEF)
- Mexican American Political Association
- Mexican American Youth Organization
- Society of Mexican American Engineers and Scientists

== Jewish-American ==
- 92nd Street Y
- American Jewish Committee
- American Jewish Congress
- B'nai B'rith
- Farband
- Hadassah
- JCC Association - umbrella organization for many Jewish Community Centers, Young Men's Hebrew Associations (YMHAs), and Young Women's Hebrew Associations (YWHAs)
- Jewish Council for Public Affairs
- Jewish Federations of North America - umbrella organizations for many Jewish Federations
- National Council of Jewish Women
- The Workmen's Circle

== Russian American ==
- Congress of Russian Americans

== Rusyn American ==
- Carpatho-Rusyn Society

== Turkish-American ==
- American Turkish Society

== See also ==
- List of hereditary and lineage organizations in the United States
- List of U.S. organizations of migrants from Austria-Hungary
- List of Estonian exile and émigré organizations
- List of Indigenous rights organizations
