= American Hellenic Educational Progressive Association =

American fraternal organization

- AHEPA
- Founded: July 26, 1922; 104 years ago Atlanta, Georgia, US
- Type: Fraternal order
- Affiliation: Independent
- Status: Active
- Emphasis: Greek heritage
- Scope: International
- Colors: Blue, White and Red
- Publication: The AHEPAN
- Chapters: 400+ active
- Members: 30,000+ active 500,000 lifetime
- Nickname: Order of AHEPA
- Headquarters: 1909 Q Street NW; Washington, D.C. 20009; United States
- Website: www.ahepa.org

The American Hellenic Educational Progressive Association (AHEPA, usually referred to as the Order of AHEPA) is a fraternal organization founded on July 26, 1922, in Atlanta, Georgia. AHEPA was founded with a focus on civil rights, particularly to counteract the Ku Klux Klan. It is the largest and oldest grassroots association of American citizens of Greek heritage and Philhellenes with more than 400 chapters across the United States, Canada, Australia, and Europe.

The mission of AHEPA is to promote the ancient Hellenic ideals of education, philanthropy, civic responsibility, family, and individual excellence through community service and volunteerism.

== History ==
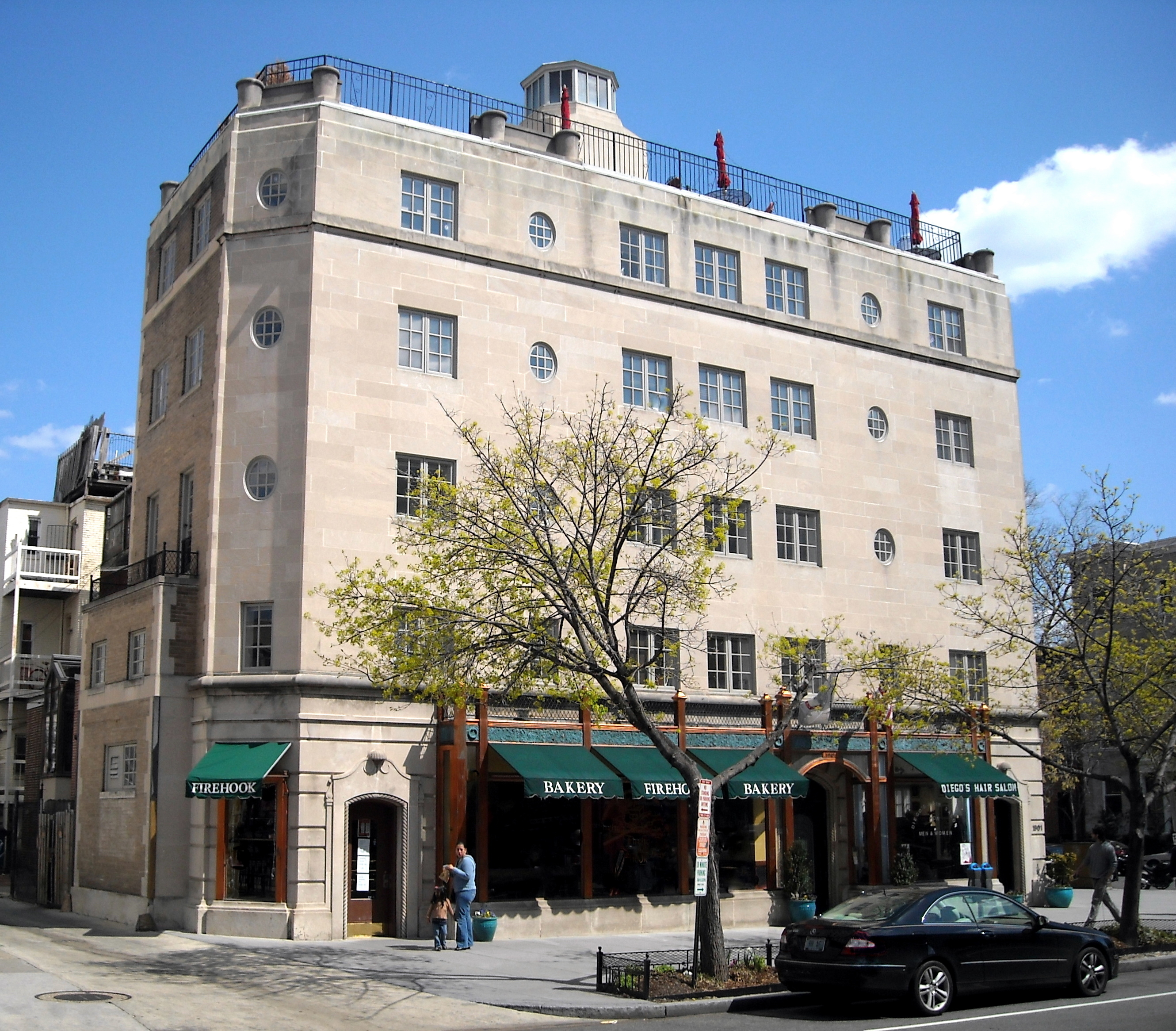
AHEPA headquarters located in the Dupont Circle neighborhood of Washington, D.C.

The American Hellenic Educational Progressive Association (AHEPA) fraternity was established in Atlanta, Georgia, on July 26, 1922. Its eight founders were residents of Atlanta who were of Greek descent, including Harry Angelopoulos, George Campbell, James Campbell, Nicholas D. Chotas, George A. Polos, Spiro J. Stamos, and James Vlass. Its initial mission was to promote the image of Greeks in America, assist them with citizenship and assimilation into American culture, and combat prejudice. At that meeting Chotas was elected its first president. In its early years, AHEPA worked with the NAACP and B'nai B'rith in order to combat discrimination, particularly against the Ku Klux Klan.

As Greek Americans assimilated into American society, AHEPA's mission shifted toward the ancient Hellenic ideals of education, philanthropy, civic responsibility, family, and individual excellence through community service and volunteerism. AHEPA expanded to countries in Europe, including Austria, Belgium, Cyprus, France, Germany, Greece, Netherlands, and the United Kingdom.

The AHEPA Family consists of four organizations: the AHEPA (men), Daughters of Penelope (women), Sons of Pericles (young men), and Maids of Athena (young women). AHEPA publishes The AHEPAN, which is the second largest Greek American publication in circulation. The American Hellenic Educational Progressive Association also maintains ties with a similar Australasian Hellenic Educational Progressive Association.

== Symbols ==
The association's colors are blue and white, based on the traditional colors of Greece. It also uses the color red.

== Membership ==
Originally, membership was restricted to only Greeks. At its third meeting, the Order decided to change this, allowing non-Greeks to join. In 1979, AHEPA had over 25,000 members in 400 chapters. By 1989, the number climbed to 60,000, despite an overall decline in memberships of fraternal groups during this period. An estimated 500,000 men have been inducted into the Order of AHEPA over its 90-year history.

== Governance ==
Originally, AHEPA was organized on a lodge system like that of the Masons or Oddfellows. Local units were called Subordinate Lodges, and state or territory structures were called Superior Lodges. Today, it consists of the supreme lodge, districts, and chapters.

=== Supreme Lodge ===
The Supreme Lodge is the main governing body of the AHEPA. The Supreme Lodge is headquartered at 1909 Q St NW in Washington, D.C. It is elected at the Supreme Convention of the Order of AHEPA, a session including the majority of the organization's members. It consists of the following officers:

- Supreme President
- Supreme Vice President
- Canadian President
- Supreme Secretary
- Supreme Treasurer
- Supreme Counselor
- Supreme Athletic Director
- National Sons of Pericles Advisor
- Supreme/Regional Governor (9)

=== Chapters ===
Local groups of AHEPA are called chapters. The Supreme Lodge can charter a chapter to a group of at least ten men. The chapter's main officer positions are president, vice-president, secretary, treasurer, chaplain, warden, and captain of the Guard. There have been 540 chapters chartered in the United States, sixteen chartered in Canada, thirty chartered in Greece, five chartered in Cyprus, and ten chartered in Europe. Over 400 chapters are active in the United States, Canada, and Europe. There are sister chapters in AHEPA Australasia (Australia and New Zealand).

=== Districts ===
Chapters are organized into 28 districts. Districts elect officers at annual district conventions, held in May, June, or July. District officers include district governor, lieutenant governor, district secretary, district treasurer, district marshal, district warden, and district athletic director. Current districts include:

Number	Name	Area served	References
1	Mother Dother Lodge	Georgia, Alabama, northwest Florida, Georgia, Mississippi, South Carolina, Tennessee	
2	Citrus	Florida (except northwest)	
3	Capital	District of Columbia, Maryland, North Carolina, Virginia	
4	Power	Pennsylvania	
5	Garden	Delaware, New Jersey	
6	Empire	New York	
7	Yankee	Connecticut, Rhode Island	
8	Bay State	Massachusetts	
9	Northern New England	Maine, New Hampshire, Vermont	
10	Automotive	Michigan	
11	Buckeye	Ohio, Kentucky, part of West Virginia	
12	Hoosier	Indiana	
13	Blue Ribbon	Illinois, Wisconsin	
14	Grainsfield	Iowa, Minnesota, North Dakota, South Dakota, Nebraska, and eastern Missouri	
16	Delta	Arkansas, Louisiana, Kansas, Oklahoma, Texas, and western Missouri	
17	Rocky Mountain	Colorado, Idaho, Montana, western Nebraska, New Mexico, Wyoming, and Ely, Nevada	
20	El Camino Real	Arizona, Hawaii, Nevada, Southern California	
21	Golden Gate	Northern California and Nevada (except Ely)	
22	Firewood	Oregon, Washington, and Alaska	
23	Beaver	Quebec, Ontario, Newfoundland, Nova Scotia, Prince Edward Island, and New Brunswick	
24	Royal Canadian	Alberta, Saskatchewan, and Manitoba	
25	Hellas	Greece	
26	Canadian	British Columbia	
27	Cyprus	Cyprus	
28	European	Europe, except for Cyprus and Greece	
	Australia	Australia, New Zealand	

== Activities ==
=== Politics ===
AHEPA has taken a stand on the Cyprus issue since 1955 when it formed the "Justice for Cyprus" committee to support Cyprus' independence. Through the decades, the organization has continued to advocate on issues relating to Greece and Cyprus in Washington, while also educating the public about these topics.

For each Congress, AHEPA compiles a Congressional scorecard on issues of importance to the American Hellenic community and the organization. The purpose of the scorecard is to educate AHEPA's membership and the community on how engaged members of Congress are on these issues, or at least, their level of awareness.

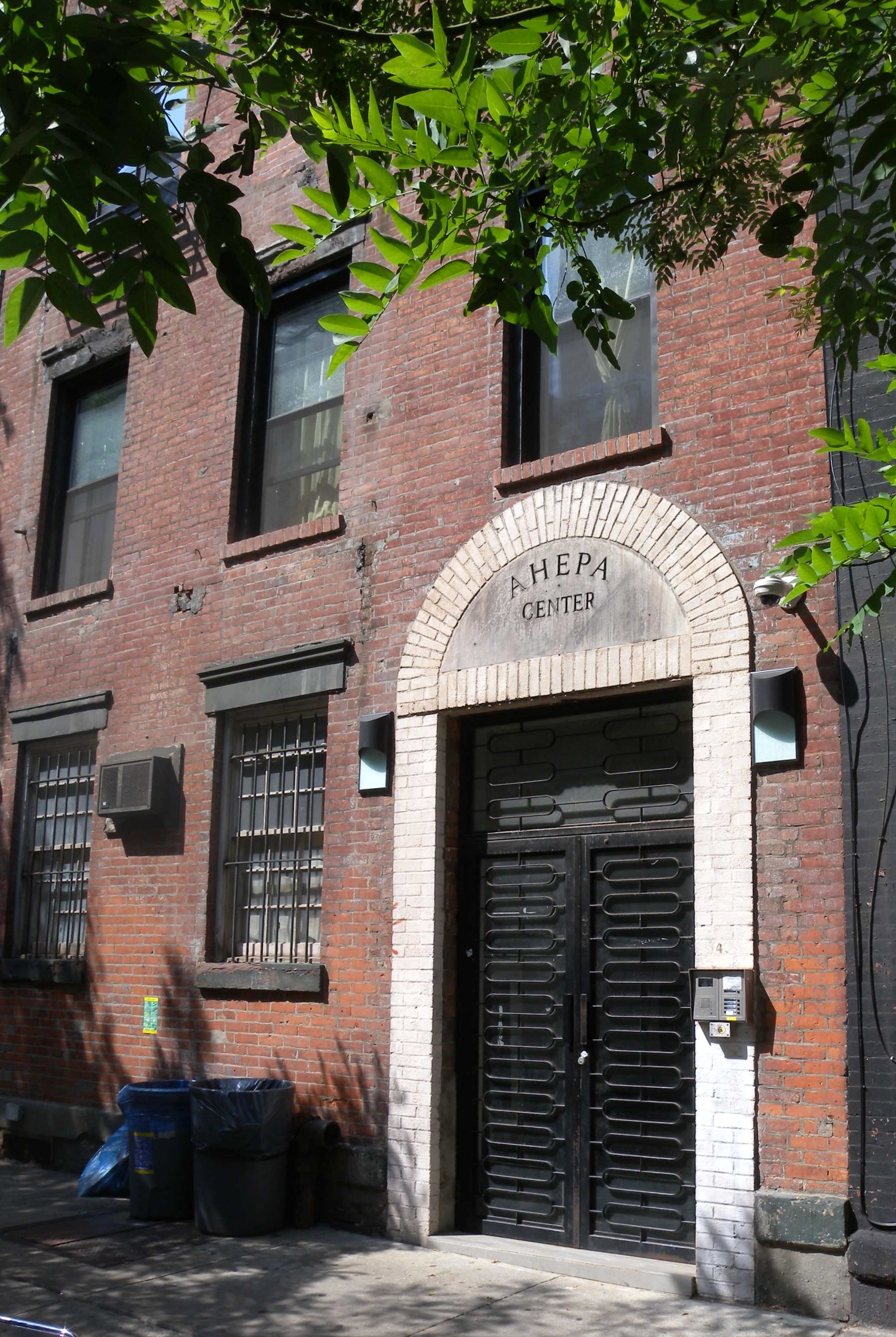
AHEPA Center, New York

=== Awards ===
AHEPA recognizes distinguished achievements in various categories such as public service, government, law, business, journalism, science, the arts, military service, and humanitarian. Some of its awards include the Academy of Achievement Award, AHEPAN of the Year, and the Pericles Award.

==== Socrates Award ====
The Socrates Award recognizes prominent men and women who have emulated ancient Hellenic ideals. This is the most prestigious award AHEPA awards and has been presented at the AHEPA National Banquet since 1964. Past recipients of the Socrates Award include:

- Henry Luce – 1964 – Publisher of Time and Life magazines
- Lyndon B. Johnson – 1966 – President of the United States of America
- Everett Dirksen – 1968 – Senator from Illinois
- Spiro T. Agnew – 1970 – Vice-president of the United States of America
- Richard M. Nixon – 1971 – President of the United States of America
- Athenagoras I of Constantinople – 1972
- United States Senate and United States House of Representatives – 1976
- Hubert H. Humphrey – 1978 – Vice-president of the United States of America
- Claiborne Pell – 1982 – Senator from Connecticut
- Bob Hope – 1984 – Entertainer
- Ronald Reagan – 1986 – President of the United States of America
- Archbishop Iakovos – 1988 – Primate of the Greek Orthodox Church of North and South America
- George H. W. Bush – 1990 – President of the United States of America
- William Pagonis – 1992 – Lt. General
- Mary Matthews – 1992 – Philanthropist
- Paul Sarbanes – 1993 – Senator from Maryland
- William Clinton – 1996 – President of the United States of America
- Patriarch Bartholomew – 1997 – Archbishop of Constantinople, New Rome, and Ecumenical Patriarch
- George W. Bush – 2002 – President of the United States of America
- Tassos Papadopoulos – 2007 – President of Cyprus
- Costas Karamanlis – 2007 – Prime Minister of Greece
- George Kalogridis – 2014 – President Walt Disney World Resort
- Joe Biden – 2015 – Vice-president of the United States of America
- John Boehner – 2015 – Speaker of the House of Representatives
- Philip Christopher – 2019 – President of the International Co-ordinating Committee "Justice for Cyprus"
- Michael Psaros – 2019 – Co-founder and Managing Partner of KPS Capital Partners
- Nicos Anastasiades – 2021 – President of the Republic of Cyprus
- Kyriakos Mitsotakis – 2021 – Prime Minister of the Hellenic Republic
- Panos Costa Panay – 2022 – Chief product officer of Microsoft,
- George Tsunis – 2023 – U.S. Ambassador to Greece

==== Athletic Hall of Fame ====
Each year, at the Supreme Convention, inductions are made into the AHEPA Hellenic Athletic Hall of Fame. The AHEPA Athletic Hall of Fame was established in 1974 to honor outstanding Hellenic athletes and sports personages.

Member	Year inducted	Member	Year inducted
Harry Agganis	1975	Alex Aronis	2000
Dee Andros	1975	George Bollas Sr.	2000
Peter Clentzos	1975	Alex G. Spanos	2000
Alex Kampouris	1975	Peter G. Stark	2000
Alex Karras	1975	Jimmie Angelopoulos	2002
Jim Londos	1975	John Critzos II	2002
Milt Pappas	1975	Charles George	2002
Pete Pihos	1975	Michael Siganos	2002
Lou Tsioropoulos	1975	Peter Angelos	2003
Gus Zarnas	1975	George Dimit	2003
Alex Grammas	1976	Jim Korfas	2003
Johnny Morris	1976	Tom Palis	2003
George Saimes	1976	Jim Carson	2004
Dr. George Kaftan	1977	Jim Daopoulos	2004
James Kekeris	1977	Nick Pappas	2004
Gus Triandos	1977	Lou Skizas	2004
Mike Castronis	1978	Mike Balitsaris	2005
William Mackrides	1978	Chris Kontos	2005
Gus Zitrides	1978	Manuel Scarmoutsos	2005
Arthur Gregory	1979	Ernie Serfas	2005
Billy Loes	1979	Anthony Loukas	2006
Anton Christoforides	1980	George Makris	2006
Gus Niarhos	1980	Carl Angelos	2007
Nick Kerasiotis	1981	George Pappas	2007
Andy Marefos	1981	Andy Sideris	2007
Chris Pelekoudas	1981	John Galaris	2009
Nick Kladis	1982	Greg Manesiotis	2009
Dr. Monthe Kofos	1982	Vasili (Billy) Pappas	2009
Archie Matsos	1982	Pete Sampras	2009
Nick Rassas	1982	Gus Constantine	2010
George Zaharias	1982	Eric Karros	2010
Ted Karras	1983	Steve Lappas	2010
John Maskas	1983	Stanley Maratos	2010
Nick Matis	1984	Art Anastopoulo	2011
Leah Poulos-Mueller	1984	Adam Archuletta	2011
Chris Farasopoulos	1985	Nick Kypreos	2011
Dr. George Poloynis	1986	Stan Spirou	2011
Nick Rodis	1986	George Theodore	2011
John Mellekas	1986	Dean Lampros	2012
Plato Andros	1987	Steve Leondis	2012
Louis Manesiotis	1987	Nick Pappageorge	2012
John Karras	1988	Tom Pappas	2012
Menil Mavraides	1988	Leonidas Tsantiris	2012
Eugene Rossides	1989	William Atessis	2013
Nickos Spanakos	1989	Nick Galis	2013
Petros Spanakos	1989	Bill Gazonas	2013
Van Nomikos	1990	Greg Louganis	2013
Peter Tountas	1990	Charles Theokas	2013
Alex Athas	1991	Peter Karmanos Jr.	2014
Bob Costas	1991	Joe Panos	2014
Louis Karras	1991	Matt Stover	2014
Archie Kodros	1991	Kirk Vidas	2014
Mike Schooles	1991	Theodore ("Ted") Leonsis	2015
Nick Conteas	1992	Christina Loukas	2015
Bill Korinthias	1992	Bob Barnek	2015
Lee Palles	1992	Paul J. Kaliades	2015
George Theodoratos	1992	Nicolette Gianulias	2016
Joe Collins	1993	Niko Koutouvides	2016
Ted Gregory	1993	John Margaritis	2016
Spiros Siaggas	1993	Steven Schubert	2016
Chris Vagotis	1993	Christos Tsiotos	2016
Al Campanis	1994	May Kotsopoulos	2017
John Diamantakos	1994	Dan Mavraides	2017
Peter Kouchalakis	1994	Nick Tsiotos	2017
John Scolinos	1994	Aleke Joy Tsoubanos	2017
Jimmy Caras	1995	Dr. James Vailas	2017
George Dales	1995	Harry Cicma	2018
James Poulos	1995	Michele Koclanes	2018
David Psaltis	1995	George Papadakos	2018
Augustus Ganakas	1996	Mark Philippoussis	2018
Dr. Tom Katsimpalis	1996	George Ravanis	2018
John Tsitouris	1996	Lt. Colonel Thomas Bellairs	2019
Paul Xanthos	1996	Valorie Kondos Field	2019
Ernest Afaganis	1997	Peter Laskaris	2019
Phil Bouzeos	1997	Adam Rand	2019
John Pachivas Sr.	1997	George Veras	2019
Lou Tsipis	1997	George John	2020
Nick Sacrinty	1998	Stamos Mazarakis	2020
Robert Samaras	1998	Eleni Rossides	2020
Fred Smerlas	1998	Christopher Soukas	2020
Leo Thalassites	1998	Marcos Baghdatis	2021
George Catavolos	1999	Speros Dedes	2021
Art Demmas	1999	Pyrros Dimas	2021
Tom Laris	1999	Emmanuel Pihakis	2021
Diana Nyad	1999	Kurt Rambis	2021
Stella Sampras-Webster	2021	Alex Anthopoulos	2022
Jim Karsatos	2022	Nick Markakis	2022
Tony Pashos	2022	Nick Voris	2022
Samantha Prahalis	2022	George Kokinis	2023
George Kostelis	2023	Alexi Lalas	2023
Nick Mourouzis	2023	Kristofer O'Dowd	2023
Jason Zafiros	2023	Michael Bramos	2024
Paul Kostacopoulos	2024	Stylianos Kyriakides	2024
Angelo Loukas	2024	Leonidas "Lonie" Paxton	2024
Mike Moustakas	2025	Jimmy Patsos	2025
Peter Soteropoulos	2025	Nicholas Theodorou	2025
Clint Zavaras	2025		

==== Harry Agganis Award ====
The Harry Agganis Hellenic Athlete Award is awarded annually to the outstanding Hellene in the field of athletics, professional or amateur, of college level and above.

Year	Award winner	Sport	Year	Award winner	Sport
1955	Alex Aronis	Football	1990	Pete Sampras	Tennis
1956	George Spanes	Football	1991	Karen Choppelas Horstmeyer	Basketball coach
1957	Alex Karras	Football	1992	Steve Lappas	NCAA basketball coach
1958	Lou Tsiriopoulos	Basketball	1993	Chris Kontos	Hockey
1959	Gus Triandos	Baseball	1994	Alkis Panagoulis	Soccer coach
1960	Milt Pappas	Baseball	1995	John Mitsopoulos	Weight lifting
1961	Chris Pelekoudas	Baseball umpire	1996	Peter Karmanos Jr.	Hockey
1962	Alex Grammas	Baseball	1997	Spiros Siaggas	AHEPA athletics
1963	George Saimes	Football	1998	Peter Clentzos	Olympic pole vaulter
1964	NONE	NONE	1999	James Daopoulos	NFL Super Bowl Referee
1965	Chris Pelekoudas	Baseball umpire	2000	John Korfas	Basketball
1966	Peter Tountas	Bowling	2001	Matt Stover	Football
1967	Dee Andros	Football	2002	None	None
1968	None	None	2003	None	None
1969	Angelo Loukas	Football	2004	Tom Pappas	Decathlon
1970	George Allen	Track	2005	NONE	NONE
1971	George Pappas	Bowling	2006	NONE	NONE
1972	Gus Ganakas	Basketball	2007	NONE	NONE
1973	Chris Farasopoulos	Football	2008	None	None
1974	Alex Strike	World Judo Champ	2009	Nick Markakis	Baseball
1975	Leah Poulos	Olympic Speed Skater	2010	George John	Soccer
1976	NONE	NONE	2011	Dan Mavraides	Basketball
1977	John Scolinos	Baseball Coach	2012	William Vlachos	Rimington Finalist
1978	NONE	NONE	2013	Niko Koutouvides	Football
1979	Alec Campanis	L.A. Dodgers GM	2014	Kostas Koufos	Basketball
1980	Lee Palles	Decathlon	2015	Giannis Antetokounmpo	Basketball
1981	Fred Smerlas	Football	2016	Mike Moustakas	Baseball
1982	Art Demmas	NFL Referee	2017	Giannis Antetokounmpo	Basketball
1983	Greg Louganis	Olympic Diving	2018	Dean Karnazes	Ultra-Marathoner Runner
1984	Mike Castronis	NCAA Football Coach	2019	Cody Bellinger	Baseball
1985	Greg Louganis	Olympic Diving	2020	Stefanos Tsitsipas	Tennis
1986	Peter Dalis	UCLA Athletic Director	2021	Ted Karras	Football
1987	Greg Tafralis	Track	2022	Jordan Kyrou	Hockey
1988	Tom Patsalis	Track	2023	Maria Sakkari	Tennis
1989	Chris Chelios	Hockey	2024	George Karlaftis	Football
			2025	Nick Calathes	Basketball

== See also ==
- AHEPA University Hospital
- List of North American ethnic and religious fraternal orders
- List of ethnic organizations in the United States
- List of general fraternities
