= William Luers =

American diplomat (1929–2025)

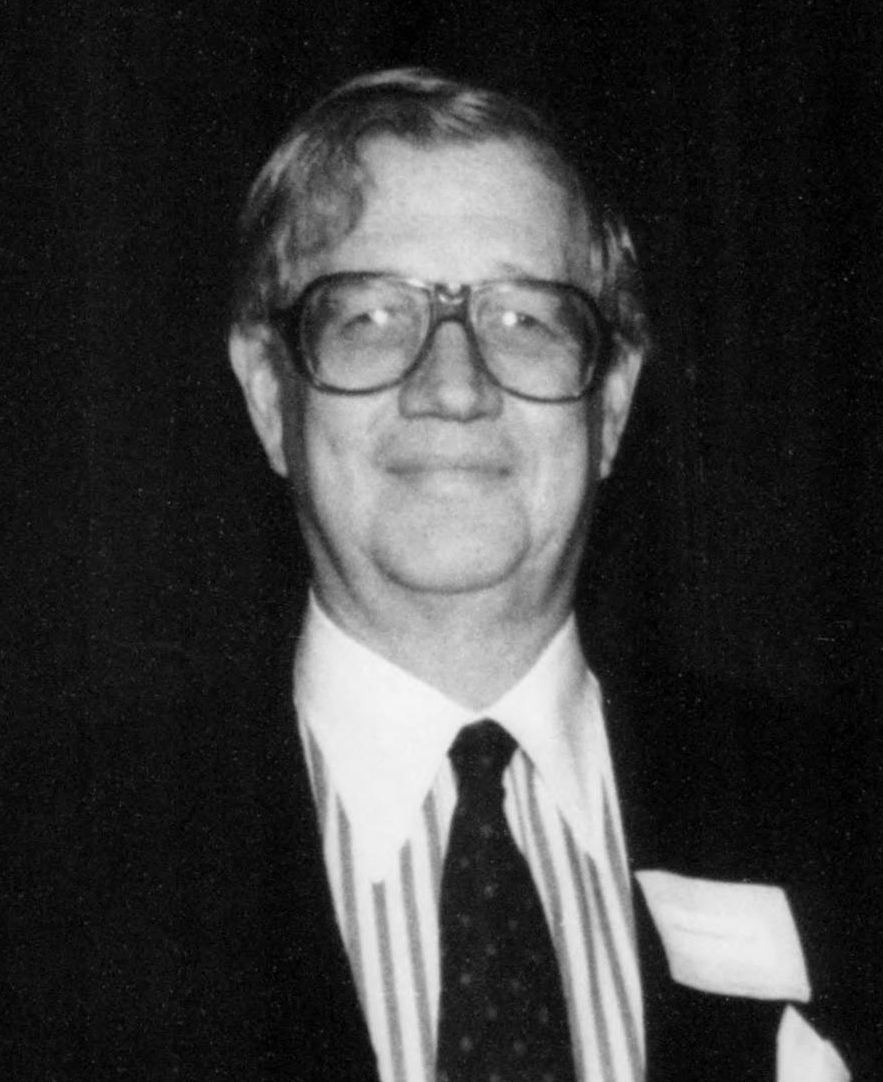
- Luers in 1991

United States Ambassador to Czechoslovakia
- In office 1983–1986
- President: Ronald Reagan
- Preceded by: Jack F. Matlock Jr.
- Succeeded by: Julian Niemczyk

United States Ambassador to Venezuela
- In office 1978–1982
- President: Jimmy Carter; Ronald Reagan
- Preceded by: Viron P. Vaky
- Succeeded by: George W. Landau

Personal details
- Born: William Henry Luers; May 15, 1929 Springfield, Illinois, U.S.
- Died: May 10, 2025 (aged 95) Washington Depot, Connecticut, U.S.
- Spouses: Jane Fuller (m. 1957; div. 1979); Wendy Turnbull (m. 1979)
- Children: 4
- Education: Hamilton College (B.A.); Columbia University (M.A.)
- Occupation: Diplomat, professor, writer

William Henry Luers (May 15, 1929 – May 10, 2025) was an American career diplomat and museum executive. He was the director of the Iran Project. In addition to a thirty-one-year career in the Foreign Service, Luers served as a U.S. Navy officer, as president of the Metropolitan Museum of Art in New York City, and as president of the United Nations Association of the United States of America. Luers was an adjunct professor at the School of International and Public Affairs at Columbia University.

== Early life and education ==
Luers was born in Springfield, Illinois, on May 15, 1929. He received a B.A. from Hamilton College and an M.A. from Columbia University.

== Military and diplomatic career ==
Luers served as an officer in the U.S. Navy from 1953 to 1957 before joining the United States Foreign Service. While he was in the U.S. Navy, he was a deck officer on aircraft carriers in the Atlantic and Pacific and spent two years as a shore patrol officer in Naples. His career in the Foreign Service spanned 31 years. His first job in the Foreign Service was as a visa officer in Naples. He worked at embassies in Moscow, Rome and other European and Latin American capitals. In 1973, he became an aide to Secretary of State Henry Kissinger and personally delivered President Richard Nixon's letter of resignation to Kissinger in 1974. His Foreign Service career also included serving as U.S. Ambassador to Czechoslovakia (1983–1986), U.S. Ambassador to Venezuela (1978–1982), Deputy Assistant Secretary of State for Europe (1977–1978), and Deputy Assistant Secretary of State for Inter-American Affairs (1975–1977). During his tenure as ambassador to Czechoslovakia, Luers protected Václav Havel by having dozens of American cultural figures visit Havel, which enhanced Havel's international reputation.

== Post-diplomatic career and other activities ==
Luers served for thirteen years as the president of the Metropolitan Museum of Art (the Met) in New York City before becoming president of the United Nations Association of the United States of America (UNA-USA) in February 1999. During his time at the Met, he spent much of his time fundraising. The museum's endowment doubled and it enlarged its staff to 1,800 full-time employees. Luers secured the Walter Annenberg collection of French Impressionist and Post-Impressionist paintings for the museum. He also oversaw the construction of new galleries and wings and expanded the museum's exhibitions and public programs.

Until his death, Luers served as director of the Iran Project, "a high-level group that has long supported negotiations with Iran."

During his lifetime, Luers was a visiting lecturer at the Woodrow Wilson School of Public and International Affairs at Princeton University; the director's visitor at the Institute for Advanced Study (1982–83); visiting lecturer at George Washington University, and visiting lecturer at the School of Advanced International Studies at Johns Hopkins University. At the time of his death, he was serving as an adjunct professor of international and public affairs at the School of International and Public Affairs, Columbia University.

Luers served on several nonprofit boards, including the boards of the Rockefeller Brothers Fund, National Museum of Natural History, Trust for Mutual Understanding, and Rubin Museum of Art. He also served as the American International advisor for the Praemium Imperiale Annual Awards to the Arts. Luers was a member of the Council on Foreign Relations and a fellow of the American Academy of Arts and Sciences and American Academy of Diplomacy.

== Personal life and death ==
Luers was fluent in Russian, Spanish, and Italian. He was first married to artist Jane Fuller from 1957 until they divorced in 1979; the couple had four children. Later that year, he married Wendy Turnbull (née Woods), the founder and president of The Foundation for Civil Society.

Luers died from prostate cancer at his home in the Washington Depot section of Washington, Connecticut, on May 10, 2025, five days before his 96th birthday.

Diplomatic posts
Preceded by Viron P. Vaky	United States Ambassador to Venezuela; 1978–1982	Succeeded by George W. Landau
Preceded by Jack F. Matlock Jr.	United States Ambassador to Czechoslovakia; 1983–1986	Succeeded by Julian Niemczyk
Cultural offices
Preceded by William B. Macomber Jr.	President of the Metropolitan Museum of Art; 1986–1999	Succeeded by David E. McKinney
