= NSHP =

NSHP may refer to:

- National Society for Hispanic Professionals, a United States–based non-government organization
- National Society of Hispanic Physicists, a Hispanic-Latino American professional organization
- Nordic Standard Helicopter Program, a defunct international helicopter procurement program in the late 1990s and early 2000s to choose a standard helicopter for Norway, Sweden, Finland, and Denmark
- NSHP, the Delhi Metro station code for Netaji Subhash Place metro station, Delhi, India
