= FAPE =

FAPE can refer to:

- Free Appropriate Public Education, an educational right of children with disabilities in the United States
- Foundation for Art and Preservation in Embassies
- FAPE, the ICAO code for Port Elizabeth Airport in Port Elizabeth, South Africa
- Fund for Assistance to Private Education, a non-profit organization in the Philippines
