= American Czech and Slovak Association =

Former U.S.-based non-profit organization

ACSA
- American Czech and Slovak Association
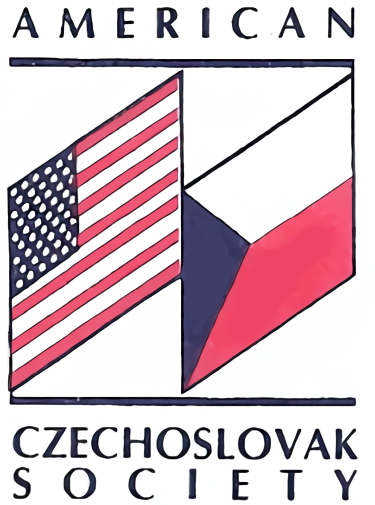
- Founded: 1990
- Legal status: 501(c)(3)
- Headquarters: Washington, D.C.
- Location: United States
- Key people: Robert Miller, President Oliver Gunovsky, Vice President Robert Doubek, Vice President

The American Czech and Slovak Association (ACSA), originally American Czechoslovak Society (ACS), was a Washington, D.C.–based national organization with a mission to facilitate contacts and cooperation between people, institutions and organizations in the United States and the Czech Republic and Slovakia, and assist in the transition to democracy and market economy in Czechoslovakia after the Velvet Revolution, which ended Communist rule in the country. It was founded in 1990, and in 1994 it served as a foundation for the new American Friends of the Czech Republic (AFoCR).

== History ==
In 1989, the communist governments of Central and Eastern Europe were in a state of collapse. The Polish Solidarity trade union and popularity of John Paul II helped force an election in Poland that created a new non-communist government. Hungary opened its borders with Austria, and in East Germany the Berlin Wall had fallen. Next month, on November 17, 1989, the Czechoslovak communist government-sanctioned ceremony took place in Prague to commemorate the 50th anniversary of the 1939 shutdown of Czech universities by the Nazi government, in which 1200 people were arrested, and 9 students murdered. This ceremony devolved into a peaceful anti-government protest in the streets of downtown Prague, and eventually culminated in the Velvet Revolution, which brought (without violence) a transition of power from the Communist Party of Czechoslovakia to a democratic federal republic.

As in many other former communist countries, the collapse of the communist regime excited many people of Czech and Slovak background who sought ways to extend support to the new fledgling republics in their transition to a democratic form of governance and in the transition to a free-market economy. In the immediate aftermath of the revolution, there was a void for the presence of such organizations for Czechoslovakia.

In Washington, D.C., a political refugee from Czechoslovakia, Robert Miller, along with George Levendis, using an ad in The Washington Post, called for a founding meeting of the American Czechoslovak Society (ACS). The meeting took place in the Georgetown Public Library on February 7, 1990, with Hana Palec, from the Czechoslovak desk at Voice of America reporting. The meeting was attended by 75 people, split between those with and without Czech or Slovak ethnic background. Resolutions on key organizational steps were adopted and, subsequently, the ACS was registered as a Delaware corporation (Company #2221522), subsequently receiving the IRS Code 501(c)(3) non-profit status.

After the peaceful dissolution of Czechoslovakia on January 1, 1993 – called in reference to the Velvet Revolution – the "Velvet Divorce", the ACS changed its name to the American Czech & Slovak Association (ACSA).

In February 1993, the ACSA moved from its original offices on 601 Pennsylvania Avenue, NW to the historical Investment Building, closer to the White House, on 1511 K Street, NW, Washington, D.C. 20005.

In 1994, with more focus given to the advocacy role, the ACSA became the foundation for the newly founded and also Washington, D.C.–based non-profit organization, American Friends of the Czech Republic (AFoCR).

== Description and Statement of Mission ==
The ACSA was a leading national Czech and Slovak focused non-profit organization registered in 1990 in Delaware with a mission to facilitate bilateral U.S.–Czech and Slovak cooperation in various areas of human endeavor and to assist the new democracy and free market reform. It was not primarily a diaspora and ethnic-based organization; rather, it brought together individual Americans and American private and public sector organizations sharing an interest in bilateral cooperation and supporting the post-Velvet Revolution era development in the Czech Republic and the Slovak Republic.

External media

Images
- American Czech and Slovak Association Newsletter, ACS News, Volume 4/1, January 1993

Video
- "Situation in Czechoslovakia". The ACSA sponsored a forum to talk about the situation in Czechoslovakia. The panel of speakers talked about the breakup of Czechoslovakia and the future relationship of the two republics.

=== Statement of Mission ===
A nonprofit, nonpolitical, nongovernmental membership organization to:

1. Promote friendship between the people of the United States of America and the people of Czechoslovakia.
2. Celebrate the history and culture of Czechoslovakia and promote in the people of the United States appreciation for the contributions of the people of Czechoslovakia in philosophy, religion, education, arts, sciences, industry, diplomacy and other fields of human endeavor.
3. Promote social, cultural, educational, professional and commercial relations between the people of the United States of America and the people of Czechoslovakia.
4. Promote and assist in the development of pluralistic democracy and free market economic system in Czechoslovakia.
5. Support the Embassy of Czechoslovakia in the United States and serve as a resource and point of contact for Czechoslovak delegations to the United States.
6. Facilitate and encourage cooperative ventures among United States and Czechoslovak commercial and professional interests.
7. Facilitate and encourage cooperative ventures among United States and Czechoslovak religious, cultural, educational, civic and social organizations and their members.
8. Organize, sponsor and conduct, either alone or in conjunction with other organizations, conferences, seminars, social meetings and other events, both in the United States and in Czechoslovakia.
9. Facilitate exchange programs among families, individuals and institutions in the United States and in Czechoslovakia, and to provide hospitality, accommodations, information and other resources for persons from Czechoslovakia visiting the United States, and to create reciprocal programs for persons from the United States visiting Czechoslovakia.
10. Sponsor instruction in the languages and customs of Czechoslovakia.
11. Support and participate in the social, cultural and educational activities of Czechoslovak American organizations and other organizations fostering appreciation of Czechoslovakia.
12. Support and cooperate with the Society of Friends of the United States (SPUSA) and similar organizations in Czechoslovakia, and with Czechoslovak organizations in the United States.
13. Produce and publish a newsletter and other print, audio and video materials.
14. Conduct fund-raising necessary to this Mission.
15. Perform any and all other nonprofit activities as shall be consistent and appropriate to this Mission.

== Organizational structure ==
=== Officers ===
- Robert Miller, President and Founder
- Oliver Gunovsky, Vice President
- Robert Doubek, Vice President, and Treasurer
- Cari Votava, Secretary

=== Academic Affairs Committee ===
Chaired by Michael Harthill, the committee provided links, contacts, and information to education-related organizations in both the United States and Czechoslovakia as well as to great numbers of volunteers willing to help with reform of educational system or teach English in schools in the Czech Republic and Slovakia. The Committee also organized the collection and shipment of English language textbooks, books, video cassettes and CDs with language and educational context. Annually, on average, ACS/ACSA sent to in the Czech Republic or Slovakia about 50 volunteer teachers of English.

=== Business and Trade Committee ===
Chaired by Ann Elizabeth Robinson, PhD, committee members facilitated development of databases of companies in both countries seeking cooperation and trade opportunities, investment, joint-ventures and transfer of know-how. The committee served as a contact point for visiting officials from Ministry of Industry and Trade, trade associations, and legislators.

=== Health and Environmental Committee ===
Chaired by Charles P. Warr, the committee taped extensive network of contact and sources of information in the area of public health and environmental protection, in particular, to assist people and governmental institutions in the Czech Republic and Slovakia to start effectively addressing very serious problems in environmental degradation, starting with significant air pollution caused by the heavily industrialized economy and decades of significant neglect in remedial measures.

On the healthcare side, besides assisting in scientific exchanges in health care and research, the committee, in cooperation with the Polish American Congress and the Olga Havel Foundation, delivered to the Czech Republic and Slovakia in total 50 kidney dialysis machines.

=== Organizational Development and Fundraising ===
Chaired by the ACS Vice-President, Robert W. Doubek, the committee utilized his expertise in representing various non-profit projects before, being one of the founding "trio" of the Vietnam Veteran's Memorial, along with Jan Scruggs and John P. Wheeler III.

=== Legal Affairs ===
Chaired by George P. Levendis, the committee served as a source of information and advice for Czech and Slovak organizations and professionals dealing with various aspects of often fundamental legal reforms taking place in both republics.

=== Cultural Affairs ===
Chaired by Countess Alice M. Tarnowski, committee members arranged for or helped to organize numerous cultural events, including concerts of chamber music, often at or in cooperation with the Czechoslovak Embassy and its Cultural Attaché.

=== ACS/ACSA News ===
Under its Editor-in-Chief, Cari Votava and then Julie Mazur, the monthly newsletter became a valuable source of information on bilateral U.S-Czechoslovak agenda to those in the private or public sector, individuals and institutions interested in the development and expansion of cooperation. The ACS News Editor-in-Chief and her team interviewed key players in the bilateral agenda, including national leaders and officials.

=== National Advisory Board ===
- Hon. Tom Lantos, Member of the U.S. Congress (D-CA), born in Hungary, the only member of both chambers of the Congress who is a survivor of the Holocaust, devoted significant parts of his life to human rights and assistance to the post-communist nations of Central Europe.
- Hon. Robert J. Mrazek, Member of the U.S. Congress (D-NY), representing his Long Island district and of Czech origin, and accomplished author and movie producer.
- Hon. Julian Niemczyk, former U.S. Ambassador to Czechoslovakia, provided important support to Czechoslovak dissidents and Charter 77 members during his mission in Prague before 1989, and provided significant assistance to the newly formed government after the Velvet Revolution.
- Hon. Charles A. Vanik, Member of U.S. Congress (D-OH), representing the Cleveland district, as an accomplished U.S. legislator, being the co-author with U.S. Senator, Henry M. Jackson (D-WA), of the Jackson-Vanik Amendment which played a significant role in relations with the Soviet Union. The Amendment for decades denied the Soviet Union and its satellites status as favorable trade nations in bilateral trade unless they adhered to certain guidelines set out on human rights. After the Velvet Revolution, Vanik led numerous initiatives in gathering support in the U.S. to support the new Czechoslovak government, helping secure re-admission of the republic to the International Money Fund and the World Bank.

In October, 1995, in recognition of Mr. Vanik's life-long achievements in assistance to democracy, and upon nomination by the ACSA President, Robert Miller, the president of the Czech Republic, Václav Havel, awarded Charles Vanik with one of the highest Czech honors, the Order of Tomáš Garrigue Masaryk, 1st Class. The act took place at the Vladislav Hall at the Prague Castle, at a traditional gala-ceremony celebrating Czechoslovak Independence Day.

The Hon. Paul Simon, U.S. Senator (D-IL), represented Illinois – a state with large Central and Eastern European communities. He was substantially involved in the post-Cold War Congressional legislative activities which were important in helping to fill the power vacuum caused by the dissolution of the Soviet Union.

=== Honorary Patrons ===
The ambassadors of the Czech and Slovak Federative Republic, and later on the Czech Republic and the Slovak Republic, respectively, served as ACS/ACSA Honorary Patrons.

- 1990-1992 Her Excellency, Rita Klímová (CSFR)
- 1992-1994 H.E. Michael Žantovský (CSFR/CR)
- 1993 H.E. Milan Erban, Charge d’Affairs (SR)
- 1993 H.E. Peter Burian, Charge d’Affairs (SR)
- 1994 H.E. Branislav Lichardus (SR)

=== Honorary Members ===
The majority of ACSA Honorary Members were members of the first official governmental delegation of Czechoslovakia who visited the United States shortly after the Velvet Revolution, in February, 1990. Honorary membership was bestowed upon them in recognition of their respective roles during the critical period of the transition in establishing the new government and market economy.

- Václav Havel, President of the ČSFR
- Václav Klaus, Minister of Finance of the ČSFR and later President and Prime Minister of the Czech Republic
- Jiří Dienstbier, Minister of Foreign Affairs of the ČSFR
- Ján Čarnogurský, Prime Minister of the SR
- Prince Karel Schwarzenberg, Chancellor for Václav Havel, and later Minister of Foreign Affairs for the Czech Republic
- Radim Palouš, President, Charles University

=== ACS/ACSA Merit Awards ===
Starting in 1991, the ACS established the annual ACS (ACSA) Merit Awards given to individuals or organizations in the U.S. or the Czech Republic and Slovakia. in recognition of significant contribution to bilateral relations and cooperation.

==== 1991 ACS Merit Award recipients ====
- Hon. Drew Lewis, Chairman, Citizens Democracy Corps. and former U.S. Secretary of Transportation
- Hon. Bart Gordon, Member, U.S. Congress (D-TN)
- Rev. Leo O'Donnovan, President, Georgetown University
- The Polish American Congress

==== 1992 ACSA Merit Award recipients ====
- Hon. Charles A. Vanik, Member of U.S. Congress (D-OH)
- Hon. William F. Weld, Governor of Massachusetts
- Bell Atlantic International (now Verizon Communications)
- Procter and Gamble Corp.
- The Miami University
- Ann Gardner, President, Education for Democracy
- Amb. Julian Niemczyk, President, People to People International, former U.S. Ambassador to Czechoslovakia
- Wendy W. Luers, President, Charter 77 and the Foundational for a Civil Society
- The Prague Post
- The University of Pittsburgh

==== 1993 ACSA Merit Award recipients ====
- Hon. Claiborne Pell, U.S. Senator (D-RI), Chairman, Foreign Relations Committee
- Michael Jordan, CEO, Westinghouse Co.
- Stephen J. Trachtenberg, President, George Washington University
- Donna Evans, Executive Director, American Chamber of Commerce in Prague
- Jiří Šetlík, Cultural Counselor, Czech Embassy in Washington, D.C.
- David Daniel, Director, Slovak Academic Information Agency
