= Degree of Honor Protective Association Building =

Former office tower, now apartments, in St. Paul, Minnesota

- U.S. National Register of Historic Places
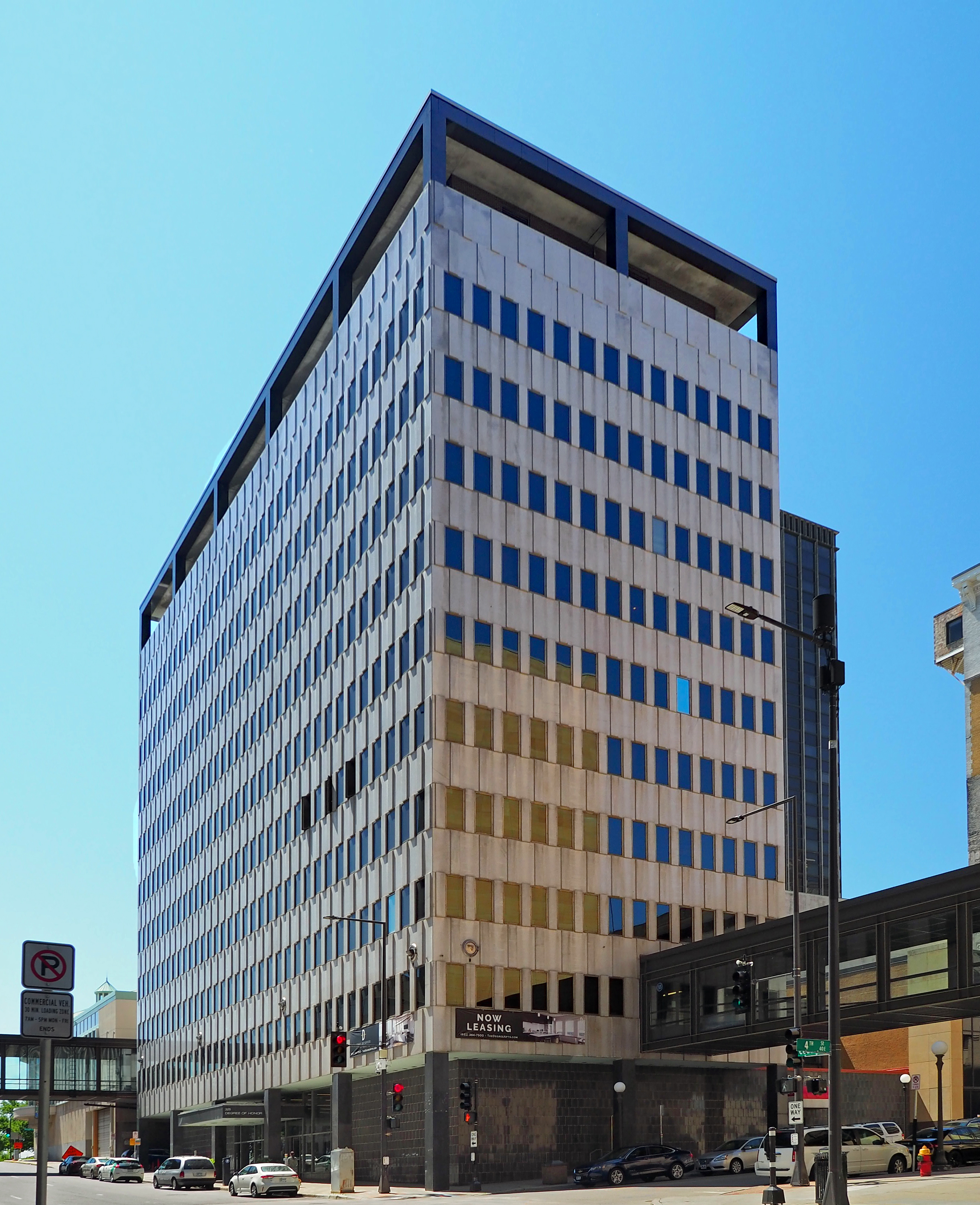
- The Degree of Honor Building viewed from the north

- Location within Minnesota
- Location: 325 Cedar Street, Saint Paul, Minnesota
- Coordinates: 44°56′42″N 93°05′33″W
- Area: 0.34 acres (0.14 ha)
- Built by: Steenberg Construction Company
- Architect: Bergstedt, Hirsch, Wahlberg and Wold
- Architectural style: Modern architecture/International Style
- NRHP reference No.: 100004657
- Added to NRHP: March 5, 2021

The Degree of Honor Protective Association Building is a former office tower in downtown Saint Paul, Minnesota, at 325 Cedar Street. It was built in 1961 and housed the Degree of Honor Protective Association's headquarters. The building was listed on the National Register of Historic Places in 2021 for its role in social history.

The Degree of Honor Protective Association was a women's fraternal benefit society and had member lodges across the country. It originated as a women's auxiliary to the Ancient Order of United Workmen in 1873. The Degree of Honor Protective Association began offering an insurance program to members in 1882. By 1908, the Ancient Order of United Workmen organization was in disarray, with many local lodges withdrawing from the Supreme Lodge, so it was apparent that the Degree of Honor needed to become an independent organization. The split was complete in 1910. By 1924, the Degree of Honor Protective Association had over 800 member lodges and had more than $24 million of insurance in force. Around 1926, the association bought a building in St. Paul at 389 Saint Peter Street (since razed) known as the Schiffman Building.

In 1953, Edna Dugan became president of the association and had a goal of modernizing, expanding, and rebranding the association. She was also committed to supporting St. Paul's local economy. Late in the 1950s, downtown St. Paul was starting to implement an urban renewal program to compete with neighboring Minneapolis, and Edna Dugan saw the opportunity to build a modern, purpose-built headquarters building. The board of directors of the association unanimously voted to build a new home office building in August 1958. They worked with a local architecture firm, Bergstedt, Hirsch, Wahlberg, and Wold, and had a design ready in November 1959. The association planned to occupy the first, eighth, ninth, tenth, and lower levels of the building, then rent out the second through seventh floors to generate income. Construction began in February 1960, but a steelworkers' strike delayed construction. Dugan took the opportunity to buy a neighboring property and worked with the architects to revise the plan, resulting in a 25% increase in the building's size. The building was complete in time for the association's national convention in 1961. This brought media attention to the association, resulting in its highest membership and amount of insurance in force.

The association sold the building in 1985 but continued to rent space in the building through the fall of 1993, then moved to another building in downtown St. Paul. In 2017, Degree of Honor Protective Association merged with Catholic Financial Life of Milwaukee and moved to that company's headquarters.

The building is rectangular-shaped, measuring 148 feet (45 m) on the east-west elevations and 99 feet (30 m) on the north-south elevations. The first floor and the eleventh floor, a mechanical floor, are both recessed and clad in black granite. The second through tenth floors are clad in gray granite and glass. There are three skyways on the second floor of the building.
