= U.Sudan Peace & Development Foundation =

- المؤسّسة الأمريكية السودانية للسلام والتنمية
- Abbreviation: USUDANPDF
- Founded: 2014
- Type: Public-Benefit Charitable Nonprofit and International Aid
- Legal status: Active
- Location: United States Sudan Italy Australia Canada Middle East
- Website: usudanpdf official site

U.Sudan Peace & Development Foundation,(Arabic: المؤسّسة الأمريكية السودانية للسلام والتنمية) is a nonprofit public benefit organization and international aid and relief agency. It was registered in Tennessee in the United States under Article 501(c)3 section of the Department of Internal Revenue. The organization was established by Sudanese American public figures to help achieve peace in Sudan through highly specialized scientific modules and intervention strategies.

== Overview ==
Sudan is known for its complex ethnic, religious and resources-based conflicts, especially in the western regions of Darfur, Nuba Mountains and Blue Nile. One of the most famous and prolonged African conflicts was the conflict between North and South Sudan that was resulted in the separation of the two parts on July 9, 2011. The conflict was also witnessed the largest intervention by world community and super blocs. Sudan's Comprehensive Peace Agreement also known as 'Naivasha Agreement" of January 2005 that were signed between the Sudan People's Liberation Movement (SPLM) and the Government of Sudan put an end to this long civil war.

=== Peace in Sudan ===
The peace process was backed by the UN, the Intergovernmental Authority on Development (IGAD), as well as IGAD-Partners, a consortium of donor countries. Comprehensive Peace Agreement was meant to end the Second Sudanese Civil War, develop democratic governance countrywide, and share oil revenues. But because of the radical Islamic policies adopted by the government of Sudan, other four bloody wars erupted in Darfur, Nuba Mountains, Blue Nile and Eastern regions. Since 2003, the African Darfurians who were killed in the fighting with government forces and its allied Arab Janjaweed militias were estimated as 300,000 and more than two million have lost their homes and properties and now live in camps established by international aid and relief agencies and organizations. Those internally displaced refugees are still an easy target and vulnerable to ground and air attacks, especially at the mountainous region of the Nuba ethnic clans.

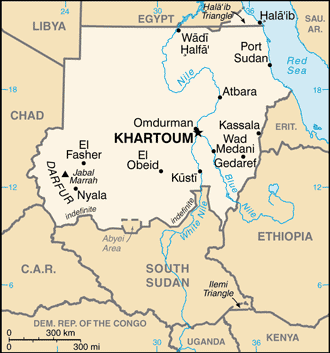
Border map of Sudan and South Sudan

== Activities ==
U.Sudan Peace & Development Foundation was established to advocate democracy, diversity and people-to-people peace negotiation between the dissenting tribes in these areas. Through carrying out some developmental projects, the foundation also helps improve the living conditions of the internally displaced by offering ideas for small businesses, building in-camp schools from local materials and providing children with local teachers and school supplies. The foundation's other projects include the highly participatory "Halfway Back Home" or (HBH Project) that aims at helping lower the relatively high mortality rates among children and infants in these camps and other marginalized areas inside the Sudan. HBH provides children with vaccines and cures for epidemic and endemic diseases like Tuberculosis, Malaria, Cholera, Ebola, etc. Providing laboratory devices that assist in diagnosis of diseases and to conduct promising research projects for new medications are also included in the project.

=== Refugees in the United States ===
Locally, the foundation joins efforts with resettlement agencies to facilitate the adaptation of Sudanese refugees into the American communities and culture. It also helps refugees get access to education and minimize the fall of immigrant children into street fault-line gangs and drug cartels. Job placement opportunities for adults, housing, transportation are also among the services provided by the foundation.

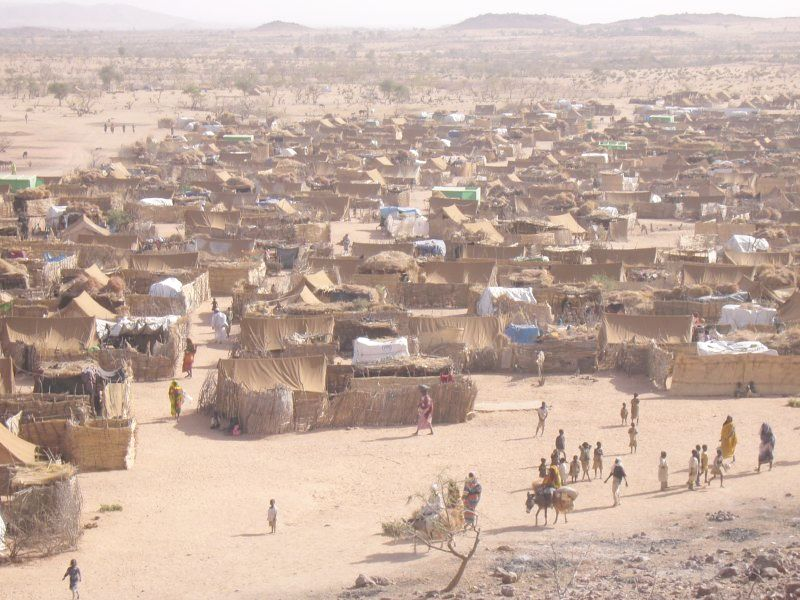
Darfur refugee camp

== Category ==
List of ethnic organizations in the United States
