= Canadian Fraternal Association =

Canadian trade association

Canadian Fraternal Association / L’Association Fraternelle Canadienne
- CFA-AFC
- Founded: 1891; 135 years ago Canada
- Type: Umbrella
- Affiliation: Independent
- Status: Defunct
- Emphasis: Benefit society
- Scope: National
- Chapters: 18
- Headquarters: 470 Weber Street North; Waterloo, Ontario N2J 4G; Canada

The Canadian Fraternal Association / L’Association Fraternelle Canadienne (CFA-AFC) was a trade association based in Waterloo, Ontario, for fraternal benefit societies in Canada which engaged in advocacy on their behalf as well as provided services. It was dissolved in July 11, 2016.

== History ==
Fraternal benefit societies became popular in Canada in the 1870s and 1880s, representing a quarter of all the insurance sold in Canada by the time the CFA-AFC was founded in 1891. The original goal of CFA-AFC was to promote the financial solvency of its members, a goal that became more important after federal and provincial governments passed laws that required them to adopt sounder actuarial policies in the first decade of the twentieth century.

By 1979 fraternal benefit societies only represented two percent of all life insurance sold in Canada. Nevertheless, the eighteen fraternal orders that made up the CFA-AFC accounted for ninety percent of all Canadian fraternalists. That percentage had declined by tenfold by 1997. In 2010, represented fedraternal organizations with approximately 400,000 Canadian members. These fraternal organizations offered financial products and services such as insurance, savings and investment vehicles as well as educational programs, volunteer services. and social activities. Its members included the Sons of Scotland.

Its last headquarters was located at 470 Weber Street North in Waterloo, Ontario. CFA-AFC was dissolved in July 11, 2016.

== See also ==
- American Fraternal Alliance
