= Sons of Poland =

American fraternal benefit society

- Founded: 1903; 123 years ago Jersey City, New Jersey, US
- Type: Benefit society
- Affiliation: Independent
- Former affiliation: American Fraternal Alliance
- Status: Merged
- Successor: Royal Arcanum
- Emphasis: Polish-Americans
- Scope: Local
- Publication: Polish American Journal
- Chapters: 0 active
- Headquarters: 333 Hackensack Street; Carlstadt, New Jersey 07072; United States

The Association of the Sons of Poland (Polish: Synowie Polski) was a Polish-American fraternal benefit society which was organized in 1903. In addition to selling life insurance to members, it supported charities in the United States and Poland as well as activities in the Polish-American community in New Jersey and New York. The Sons of Poland merged with the Royal Arcanum.

== History ==
The Association of the Sons of Poland was established in 1903 as a fraternal benefit society. At the onset of existence the Association's goals were to provide benefits for Polish-American families and send financial help to their relatives in Poland. The Association grew both in membership and financial stability becoming a leader in upholding the traditions of Polish Heritage and patriotism as well as continuing an active contact with Poland.

During World War I, the delegates to the association's quadrennial convention voted to tax each member two cents each month to be sent to feed hungry war victims in Poland. In the 1930s, large sums of money were sent to assist flood victims in southern Poland followed by tremendous donations to assist the poor in Polish cities. The Second Republic of Poland recognized the association with the Złoty Medal Zasługi (Gold Medal of Service). The Association continued assisting Poland during World War II.

The association helped form the Polish-American Congress and the Pulaski Memorial Parade Committee in New York City. It was a member of the American Fraternal Alliance.

The Association of the Sons of Poland merged with the Royal Arcanum. It survives as the Sons of Poland Council of the Royal Arcanum Fraternal Benefit Society.

== Activities ==
The Sons of Poland supported Polish language courses and organizations that promoted Polish culture and heritage, such as the Polish Singers Alliance of America and an exhibit of art at Seton Hall University. It sponsored the Polish Children's Heartline and the Polish Gift of Life, charities that provide medical care for Polish children. It also supported the Kosciuszko Foundation, the Polish Cultural Foundation, and Polish Orphans, as well mentally and physically disabled children, the homeless, and un-wed mothers both in Poland and the United States. Its Bridges to Poland program send English language books to libraries and schools in Poland.

The Sons of Poland Benevolent Foundation, a 501(c)(3) charity, established in 2004 to support and educated children in the United States and Poland. It also supported charities that worked with the elderly in both countries.

It published the Polish-American Journal, later called Pol-Am Journal.

== Organization ==
Local units were referred to as "Lodges/Groups". Twenty membership could establish their own group. However, a minimum of fifty members of the lodge/group was required to send a delegate to the convention. Its highest national structure was the Supreme Convention, which met quadrennially. Its last headquarters was located at 333 Hackensack Street in Carlstadt, New Jersey, while the organization was originally established in Jersey City.

== Membership ==
Membership was through the purchase of life insurance. Benefits of insured membership include a subscription to the monthly Polish American Journal, scholarships and achievement awards for high school seniors, prescription benefit cards, LifeLine Screenings to detect a possible tendency for stroke or aneurisms; group health care discounts, and accidental death/dismemberment insurance.

== See also ==
- History of Poles in the United States
- List of ethnic organizations in the United States
- List of North American ethnic and religious fraternal orders
- Polish people
