= Royal Neighbors of America National Home Historic District =

Historic district in Iowa, United States

- Royal Neighbors of America; National Home Historic District
- U.S. National Register of Historic Places
- U.S. Historic district
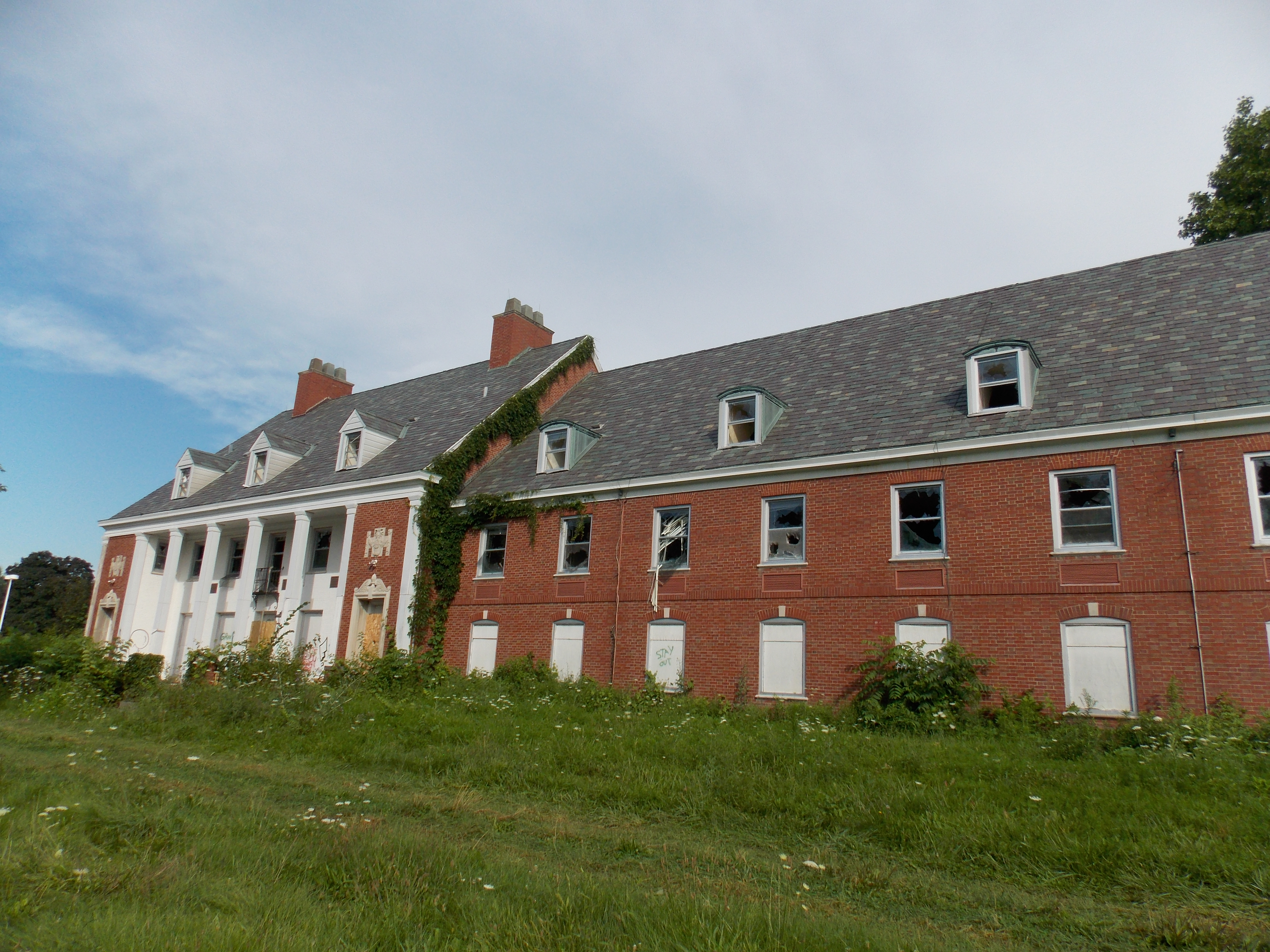

- Location within Iowa Location within the United States
- Location: 4760 Rockingham Rd. Davenport, Iowa
- Coordinates: 41°30′15″N 90°38′48″W
- Area: 28.42 acres (11.50 ha)
- Built: 1931
- Architect: Clausen, Kruse & Klein
- Architectural style: Georgian Revival
- NRHP reference No.: 15000294
- Added to NRHP: June 2, 2015

The Royal Neighbors of America National Home, also known as Grandview Terrace, is a nationally recognized historic district located on a bluff overlooking the Mississippi River in the west end of Davenport, Iowa, United States. It was listed on the National Register of Historic Places in 2015. At the time of its nomination, it consisted of eight resources, which included two contributing buildings, one contributing site, one contributing structure, two contributing objects, and two non-contributing buildings. The main building was demolished in 2018.

== History ==
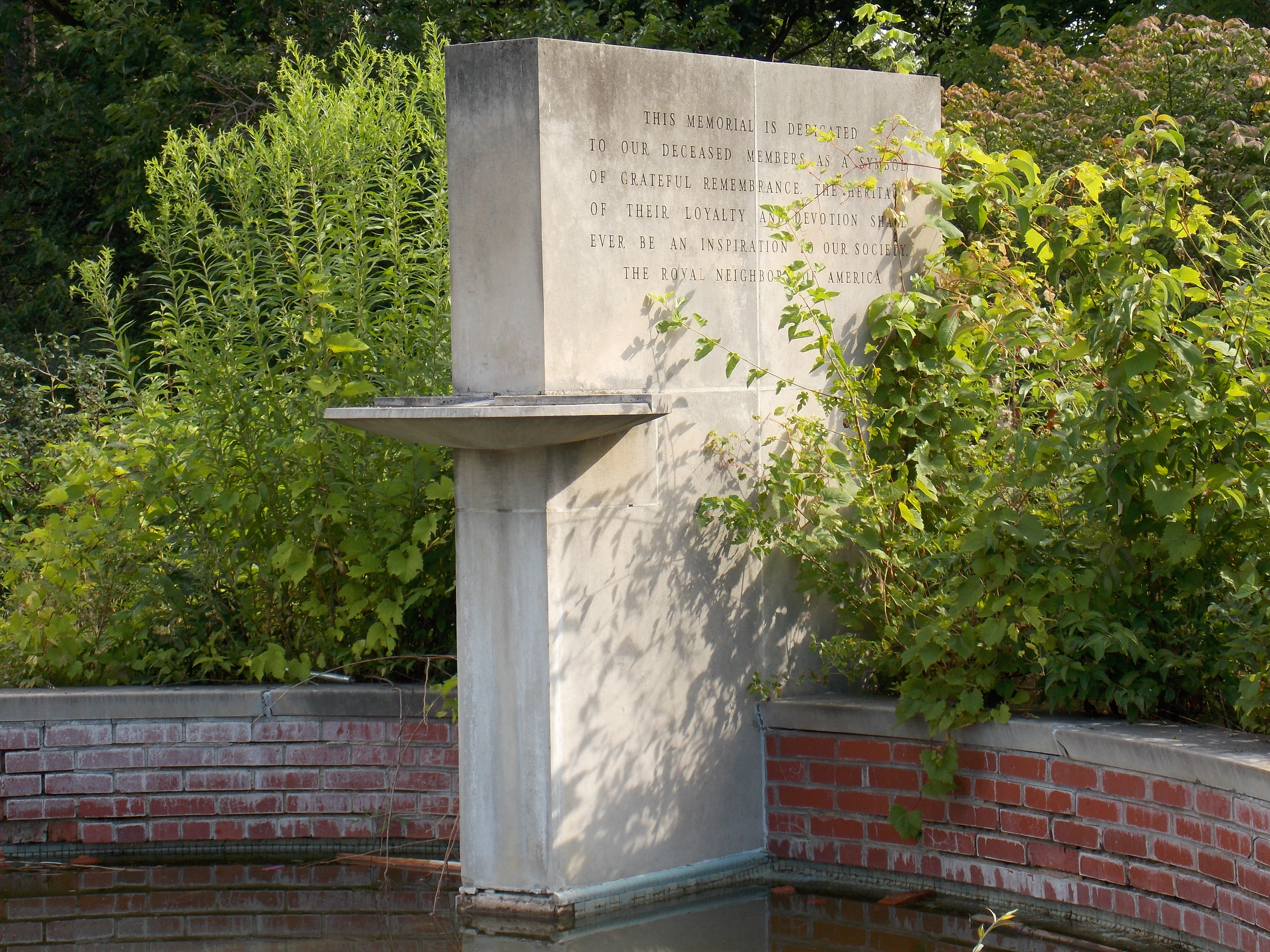
Memorial to deceased members (1957)

Founded in 1895, Royal Neighbors of America was the first fraternal benefit society that provided life insurance protection for women. It is based across the river from Davenport in Rock Island, Illinois. In 1929 Royal Neighbors passed a resolution to establish a facility that would provide a home for mothers and other women in their organization who were in need of assistance. They bought 40 acres (16 ha) of land along Rockingham Road in Davenport's west end in February 1930.

The Davenport architectural firm of Clausen, Kruse & Klein designed the facility in the Georgian Revival style. The building featured a columned porch that extended across the front of the building and a living room with floor-to-ceiling windows and a fireplace. Five hundred people gathered for its dedication on July 18, 1931, as the Royal Neighbors National Home. It was set high on a bluff that overlooked the Mississippi River, and it had space for 52 residents. Over the years the property grew to encompass 77 acres (31 ha).

In order to live there, the residents had to turn over their assets to the society and they were allowed to live at the home until they died. They also had to be of "good moral character, free from contagious or infectious disease, unable by reason of age to provide for the necessities of life…" In exchange, residents were assured they would be cared for without further cost for the rest of their lives. The home's name was changed to Grandview Terrace in 1993. The facility increasingly faced an operations deficit, and regulatory demands to update the building were also mounting. In order to control costs, the policy by which members turned their assets over to the society to live at Grandview Terrace was changed in 1996 so that members could pay rent instead.

The Royal Neighbors membership decided that providing senior housing was not part of its core mission and they closed the home on October 1, 2004. The contents of the home were sold at auction. The facility was sold to an investment group based in Baltimore, Maryland named Grandview Estates LLC in 2006. At the time their plan was to turn the facility into a retirement community based on plans that were developed by Royal Neighbors. The property went into foreclosure in 2012 for nonpayment by Wells Fargo Bank, which held the mortgage. It was bought by Carver Blackwell Holdings LLC in 2013. The facility was torn down in January 2018, and the property was put up for sale.

== Historical significance ==
The significance of the historic district is as "a unique example of a retirement home constructed specifically for members of a women's fraternal benefit society." Its architecture also contributed to its significance. The main building (1931) and the pump house (1931) are the contributing buildings, the landscaped property is the contributing site, the curved driveway is the contributing structure, and the entrance markers (1963) and the circular memorial fountain (1957) are the contributing objects. The two entrance markers are replacements for the originals built in 1931. The original design and stone elements from 1931 were used in their construction. Two outbuildings are the non-contributing buildings.
