= Police and Firemen's Insurance Association =

The Police and Firemen's Insurance Association is a mutual benefit association for policemen and firemen.

== History ==
In 1912 a series of catastrophes effected the Indianapolis Police Department and the Indianapolis Fire Department, resulting in a large number of casualties and destitute families in both departments areas. The Police and Firemen's Insurance Association was founded in 1913 to provide immediate relief to the affected families and was originally intended to be a local concern.

However, the organization quickly spread to other police and fire departments around the country.

== Organization and membership ==
Local groups are known as "Section"; they are required to meet at least once a month and have a Relief Committee. The national convention or "Supreme Legislative Body" meets quadrennially.

In 1967 the PFIA had 38,000 members. By 1979 this had declined to 14,000 in 39 states and the District of Columbia, though it still claimed to be the largest organization in the world whose membership was limited to police and firemen.

== See also ==
- Fraternal Order of Police
