= Teachers Life =

Canadian fraternal benefit society

Teachers Life Insurance Society (Fraternal)
- Trade name: Teachers Life
- Type: Fraternal benefit society
- Industry: Financial services
- Founded: 1939; 87 years ago
- Headquarters: Mississauga, Canada
- Areas served: Canada
- Products: Life insurance; Disability insurance
- Website: teacherslife.com

Teachers Life Insurance Society (Fraternal), operating as Teachers Life, is a Canadian fraternal benefit society which provides life insurance and disability insurance to members in Alberta, British Columbia and Ontario.

== History ==
Teachers Life was founded to by a group of Ontario secondary school teachers with the goal of helping each other. Teachers Life was incorporated in 1939 and federally incorporated in 2008.

== Structure ==
Teachers Life is a Fraternal Benefit Society providing life insurance products to its members. As a Fraternal Benefit Society membership is limited to members of the education community and their immediate families.

Teachers Life is regulated by the Office of the Superintendent of Financial Institutions and Financial Services Commission of Ontario.
