= Gleaner Life Insurance Society =

The Gleaner Life Insurance Society, originally known as the Ancient Order of Gleaners, is a fraternal benefit society based in Adrian, Michigan.

== History ==
The Ancient Order of Gleaners was formed in 1894 in Caro, Michigan by Grant Slocum. Articles of incorporation were drawn up by attorney Walter Gamble and submitted to the Michigan Insurance Commissioner on September 2, 1894 and a charter was granted September 25. The Gleaners were the first fraternal society incorporated under Act 119, a law regulating insurance passed by the Michigan legislature that year. At the time the group had 220 members. A newspaper man himself, Slocum published the group's first four-page newsletter that eventually became The Gleaner, a "large and influential farm journal".

== Organization ==
The Gleaners worked on a two tier organizational modal - local lodges, known as "Arbors". Each Arbor had a set of officers - Chief Gleaner, Vice-Chief Gleaner, Secretary, Treasurer Chaplain, Conductor, Conductress Lecturer and Guard. The last five officers had ritual duties. There were 98 active Arbors in 1979. The national structure was called the "Supreme Arbor", which met biennially. The headquarters were in Birmingham, Michigan, as of 1979. In 1981, Gleaner's headquarters moved to Adrian, Michigan, where it remains today.

== Membership ==
Initially, membership in the society was restricted to farmers, gardeners and related occupations in towns with fewer than 3,000 residents. By the 1970s, membership criteria expanded to include individuals of good moral character, over the age of sixteen who believed in a "Supreme Being, the Creator and Preserver of the Universe". Members were voted on by blackball ballot, with two blackballs sufficient for rejection. There were three categories of membership - Junior, Beneficiary and Cooperative. Cooperative members joined the organization, but without insurance benefits. Juniors were insured from birth to age fifteen and became Beneficiary members after they turned twenty one.

In 1969 the Gleaners had 55,000 members. By 1979 this had declined to 47,000 members. The Gleaners had 43,000 members in 1994. As of 2013, the group claims 74,000 members.

== Ritual ==
The Gleaners had a structured ritual system consisting of four degrees: Initiatory, Adoption, Ruth, and Dramatic. The Initiatory degree was required of all members. The names, rituals and ceremonies of the three degrees were based on the Biblical Book of Ruth. The rituals also included prayers and hymns, but omitted any explicit references to Christianity or Jesus Christ.

== Benefits and activities ==
In addition to providing insurance benefits, The Gleaners sponsor scholarships and volunteers at the Arbor level. Recreational activities include baseball, bowling, square dancing and picnics.
