= Joint Baltic American National Committee =

Organization in USA which deals with Baltic states topics

Joint Baltic American National Committee, Inc.
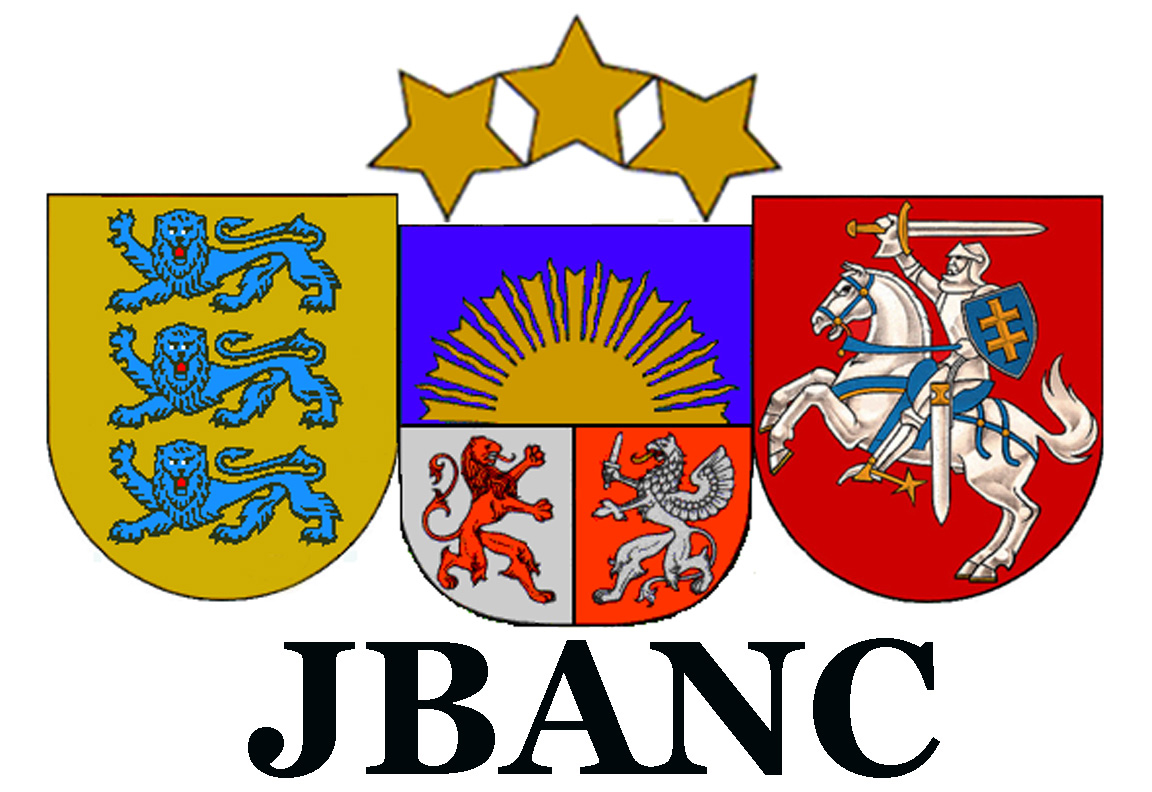
- Abbreviation: JBANC
- Formation: 1961; 65 years ago
- Type: Nonprofit
- Headquarters: 400 Hurley Ave.
- Location: Rockville, MD
- President: Mai-Liis Bartling
- Chair: Marju Rink-Abel
- Managing Director: Karl Altau
- Board of directors: JBANC Board & Staff
- Parent organization: Estonian American National Council; American Latvian Association; Lithuanian American Council
- Website: jbanc.org

The Joint Baltic American National Committee, Inc. (JBANC) is a non-profit organization dedicated to monitoring and advocating on issues affecting Baltic-American communities in the United States and the nations of Estonia, Latvia, and Lithuania. JBANC functions as the public affairs bureau for its three parent organizations, the Estonian American National Council (EANC), the American Latvian Association, Inc., and the Lithuanian American Council, Inc. (LAC). The organization was founded on April 27, 1961, through a joint proclamation by the Estonian National Committee in the U.S., chaired by Julius Kangur; the American Latvian Association, led by President Peter P. Lejins; and the Lithuanian American Council, headed by President Leonard Simutis.

== Mission ==
Since its inception, JBANC has worked with members of Congress, the White House, the State Department, and other federal agencies to promote the Baltic-American agenda. The group focuses heavily on fostering democratic principles, promoting human rights worldwide, supporting the establishment of peaceful relations among nations, and seeking the restoration and maintenance of security throughout Central and Eastern Europe.

== History ==
In the late twentieth century, JBANC actively advocated for the admission of the Baltic countries into NATO and the European Union. When Estonia, Latvia and Lithuania all became full members of both organizations in 2004, JBANC turned its efforts to a host of issues that continue to demand attention today. These include bearing witness to the legacy of communism; defending the Baltic nations against unjust accusations and historical revisionism; promoting democracy beyond the Baltics; strengthening transatlantic integration and American engagement in the Baltics; and expanding relations with other ethnic organizations and NGOs in the U.S. and abroad.

Following Russia's aggression against Ukraine, which highlighted its strategic threat to the United States, Europe, and particularly to Estonia, Latvia, and Lithuania, JBANC refocused its efforts on promoting peace and security in the Baltic region. JBANC supports the European Reassurance Initiative (ERI), which enhances the readiness of the U.S. and NATO allies to respond to Russia's expanding aggression against neighboring countries. Also, JBANC draws attention to the hybrid warfare in Ukraine and Russia's continued occupation of Crimea and territories in Georgia, and the continuous provocations against the Baltic countries, including the kidnapping of an Estonian intelligence officer, dangerous aerial and maritime incursions around the Baltic Sea, and its ceaseless campaigns of disinformation.

The organization hosted a conference, in Washington, D.C. on April 16–18, 2015, which focused on the theme: "History Repeated: Baltics and Eastern Europe in Peril?". Speakers at the event included President of Estonia Toomas Hendrik Ilves, former Lithuanian Prime Minister Andrius Kubilius, European parliamentarian Artis Pabriks, along with Ambassador John Heffern, James Kirchick, Liz Wahl, Paul Goble, Paul Joyal, David Kramer, Luke Coffey, and others.

JBANC held its Twelfth Baltic conference in Washington, D.C. on May 19–20, 2017 under the topic of "New Realities: The Baltic Region in a Changing World."

JBANC held its Thirteenth Baltic Conference in Washington, D.C. on November 9, 2019. Some key speakers included the Prime Minister of Estonia, Jüri Ratas, the U.S. ambassadors to Estonia, Latvia, and Lithuania, as well as Michael Carpenter, managing director of the Penn Biden Center for Diplomacy and Global Engagement at the University of Pennsylvania. Dr. Carpenter was later nominated by President Joe Biden to serve as the Permanent Representative of the United States of America to the organization for Security and Cooperation in Europe, and was confirmed by the United States Senate on November 3, 2021.

In 2018, JBANC hosted the first Baltic Advocacy Day, in which Baltic-American constituents were encouraged to meet with their members of Congress to voice concerns over issues relevant to the Baltics. The second Baltic Advocacy Day happened on November 8, 2019, in Washington, DC and the third, a Baltic Advocacy Week, took place virtually from March 8–12. The 2021 Baltic Advocacy Week also took place virtually.

In 2024 JBANC took part in a Baltic Way commemoration event in Washington D.C, alongside the Baltic embassies and other American organizations.

== Organization ==
JBANC's board of Directors consist of representatives from each of its parent organizations. The managing director of the organization is Karl Altau.
