= Foundation for Art and Preservation in Embassies =

American nonprofit organization

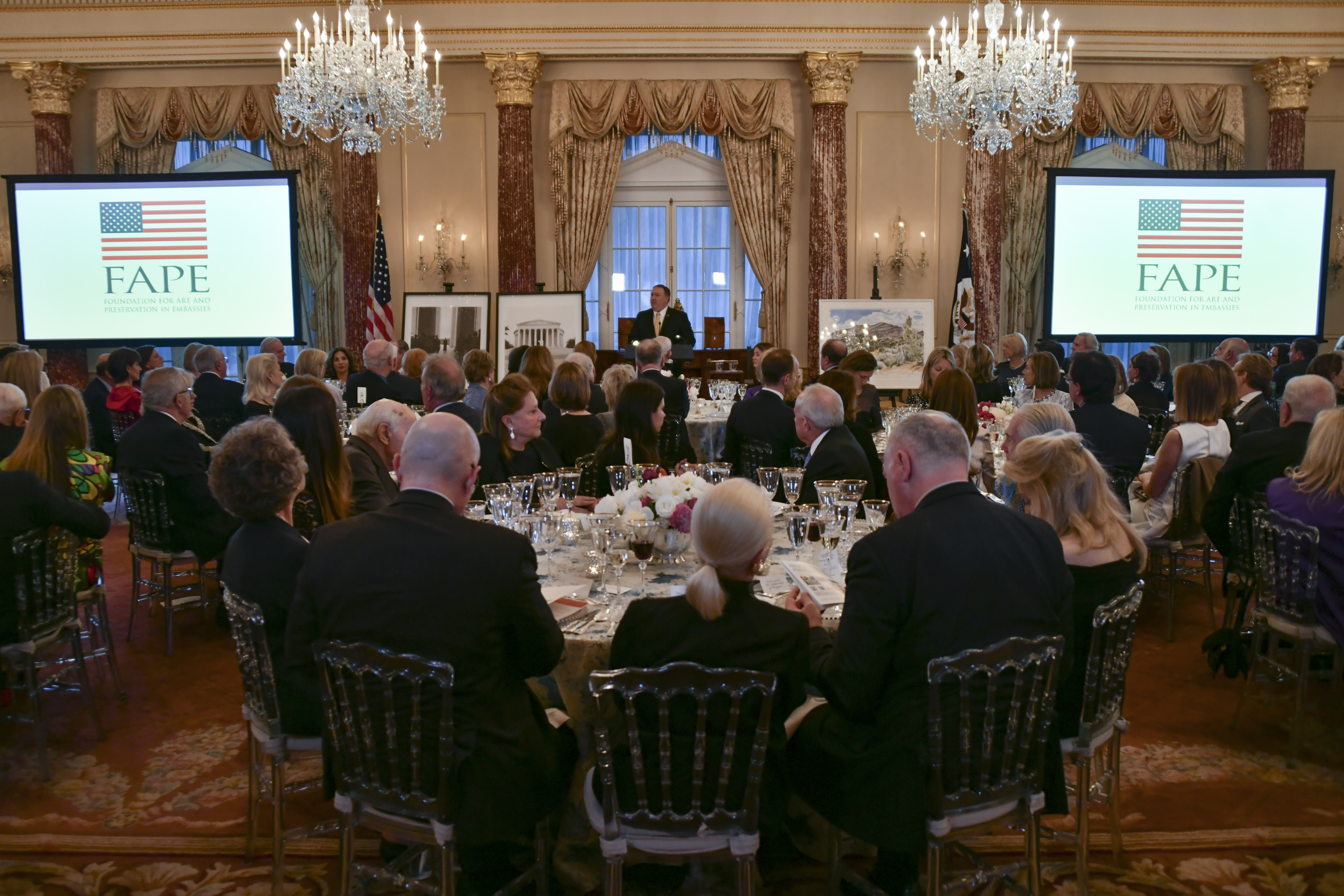
Secretary of State Mike Pompeo speaks at the 2019 FAPE dinner at the US State Department.

The Foundation for Art and Preservation in Embassies (FAPE) is a non-profit 501(c)(3), non-partisan organization dedicated to enhancing the United States' image abroad through American art. Founded as a public-private partnership in 1986, FAPE works with the U.S. Department of State to contribute fine art to U.S. embassies around the world. FAPE's donations include works by more than 145 American artists placed in over 70 countries. Headquartered in Washington, D.C., FAPE has raised over $42 million in art and monetary contributions.

== FAPE History ==
FAPE was established in 1986. The organization was founded by Leonore Annenberg, Wendy W. Luers, Lee Kimche McGrath and Carol Price. As spouses of former U.S. ambassadors and with Mrs. McGrath as the Director of ART in Embassies at the State Department, FAPE's founders recognized a need to build upon the State Department's ART in Embassies Program by providing permanent works of art that would endure the tests of time in embassies across the world. FAPE's Chairman is currently Mrs. Jo Carole Lauder. FAPE's President is Ann L. Gund and FAPE's Vice President is Eden Rafshoon. The Director of FAPE is Jennifer Duncan. For a full list of FAPE's board members, please see: https://web.archive.org/web/20090417003108/http://fapeglobal.org/board.html

== FAPE Projects ==
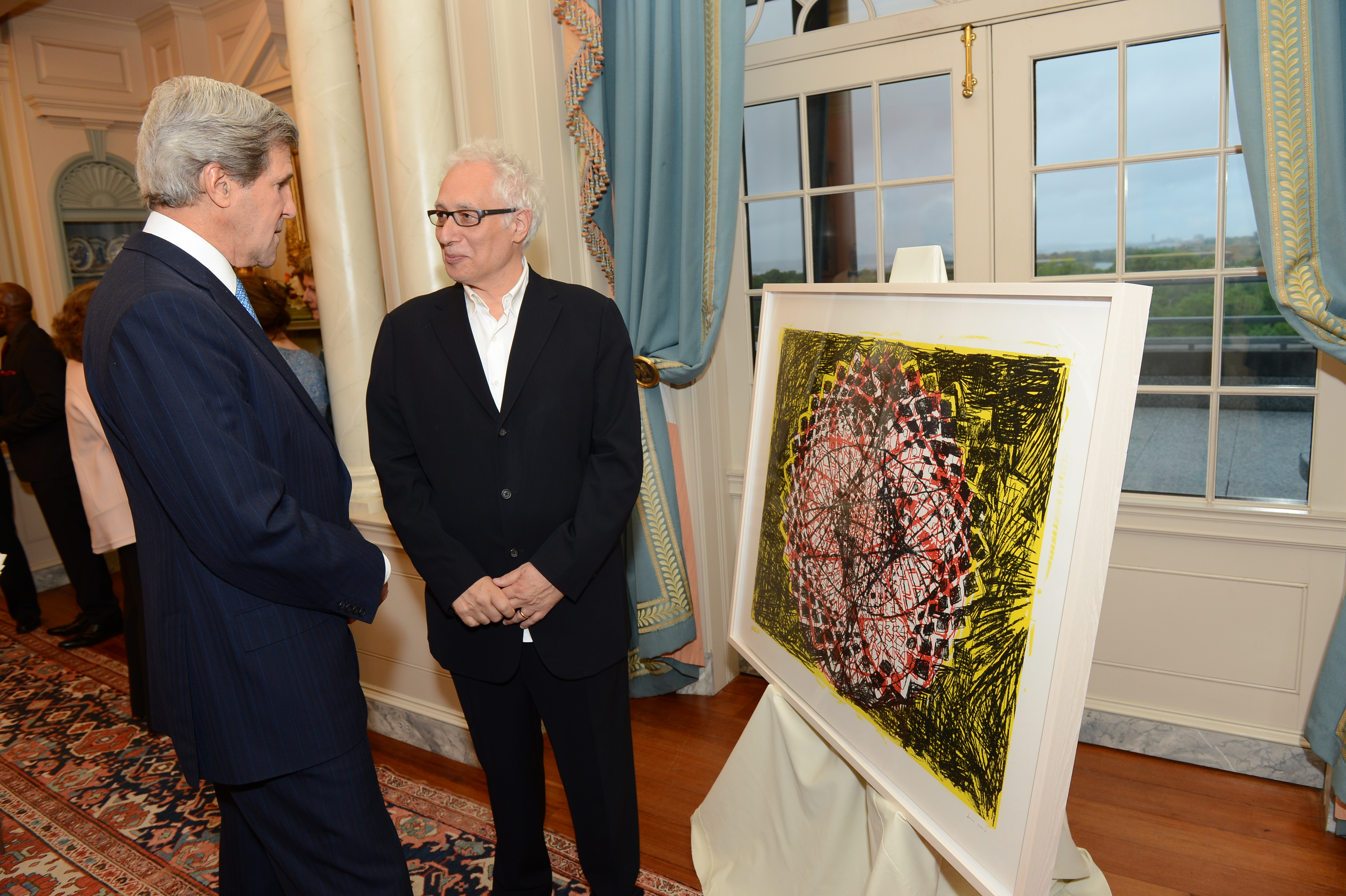
Secretary of State John Kerry reviews a piece of artwork at the 2013 FAPE dinner at the US State Department.

FAPE's restoration projects include the historic eighteenth-century Hôtel de Talleyrand, in Paris, once headquarters for the Marshall Plan and now an American embassy annex building; Winfield House, the Embassy Residence in London, which is supported by an endowment established by Leonore and Walter H. Annenberg through the Annenberg Foundation; restoring the treasures of the Petschek Palace, the U.S. Embassy Residence in Prague; preserving ancient statuary in the gardens at the U.S. Embassy in Rome; and the complete refurbishment of public rooms at the U.S. Embassy Residences in Warsaw and Beijing. Funding has also been provided by FAPE for restoration projects at the U.S. Embassy Residences in Brussels, Budapest, Buenos Aires, Madrid, Paris, and Vienna.

To celebrate the millennium, in 2001 FAPE assembled an unprecedented GIFT TO THE NATION¬, consisting of 245 American artworks representing more than 145 artists that have been placed in permanent locations in embassies around the world.

FAPE understands the importance of our country's presence overseas and strives to increase art's dynamic role in promoting America's culture abroad. By partnering with American artists, FAPE gifts encourage cross-cultural understanding within the diplomatic community and the international public. The organization fulfills this mission in two ways:

=== Site-Specific Works ===
In commissioning work, FAPE is assisted by an advisory committee of prominent arts professionals, chaired by Robert Storr, Dean of the Yale School of Art. Once an artist has been selected and has agreed to create a work, the embassy architects, the State Department, FAPE, and the artist work together to ensure that the art is sensitively integrated within the building and its grounds. The works are all donated by the artists, and FAPE provides the funds to pay for their fabrication and installation. Artists in the Collection include Lynda Benglis, Louise Bourgeois, Ellsworth Kelly, Sol LeWitt, Maya Lin, Martin Puryear, Dorothea Rockburne, Joel Shapiro, Michael Singer, and Elyn Zimmerman.

=== Lee Kimche McGrath Original Print Collection ===
Each year an American artist contributes a print for display in U.S. embassies. Named for FAPE's Founding Director, this is FAPE's oldest program. The Original Print Collection began in 1989, when Frank Stella donated The Symphony in an edition large enough for a print to be sent to every American embassy. Since 1995, John Baldessari, Louisiana Bendolph, Mary Lee Bendolph, Loretta Bennett, Vija Celmins, Chuck Close, Jasper Johns, Alex Katz, Ellsworth Kelly, Roy Lichtenstein, Elizabeth Murray, Loretta Pettway, Robert Rauschenberg, Susan Rothenberg, and Ed Ruscha have contributed editions.

== The Annenberg Award ==
In April 2008, FAPE established The Leonore and Walter Annenberg Award for Diplomacy through the Arts to honor distinguished American individuals who have demonstrated outstanding achievements in furthering global understanding of the United States. Honorees must demonstrate long-term excellence and innovation in the exchange of creativity and ideas that represent the rich and diverse culture of the United States. U.S. Supreme Court Justice Stephen Breyer was the first recipient of this award.
