= Peter Clentzos =

Greek American pole vaulter (1909–2006)

Panagiotis D. "Peter" Clentzos (June 15, 1909 in Oakland, California — September 11, 2006 in Rancho Mirage, California) was an American pole vaulter and the son of Greek immigrants who competed for Greece in the 1932 Summer Olympics.

== Early life and education ==
Clentzos was born in Oakland, California. His father, a carpenter, and his mother had emigrated to the United States from Kythera, an island in Greece.

Clentzos attended the University of Southern California, where he was a member of the track and field team. For three years he lettered on the USC team coached by Dean Cromwell and that won NCAA team titles in 1930 and 1931.

== Athletic career ==
He tried out as a pole vaulter for the United States team in the 1932 Olympics, but fell just short of qualifying. His Greek heritage allowed him to vie for one of the 16 spots on Greece's team.

Clentzos' personal best in the pole vault competition was 13 feet, 9 inches. In the event at the 1932 Olympics, however, he cleared only 12 feet 3.5 inches, earning him seventh place.

== Teaching and military service ==
After graduating from USC, Clentzos taught history and woodworking, which he had learned from his father, at Barstow High School in Barstow, California. He also coached the football and track teams.

During World War II he joined the U.S. Army and was assigned to the Santa Ana Army Air Base as a physical education instructor.

== Later career and community involvement ==
After the war, Clentzos and his wife Helen moved to Pasadena, California, where he initially worked as a teacher and coach at Roosevelt High School. He later served as an administrator at Narbonne High School and Boys Vice-Principal at Franklin High School in Northeast Los Angeles.

Clentzos was co-founder and meet announcer at the Pasadena/Crown Valley Senior Olympics until shortly before his death. He was given the Senior Service Award by the Pasadena Senior Center in 2004.

Clentzos attended the 2004 Summer Olympics in Athens as a guest of the government of Greece. He also ran a leg of the Olympic torch relay that year.

== Death ==
Clentzos died in Rancho Mirage, California at Eisenhower Medical Center. His death was attributed to complications from hip surgery.
