= Degree of Honor Protective Association =

American fraternal benefit society

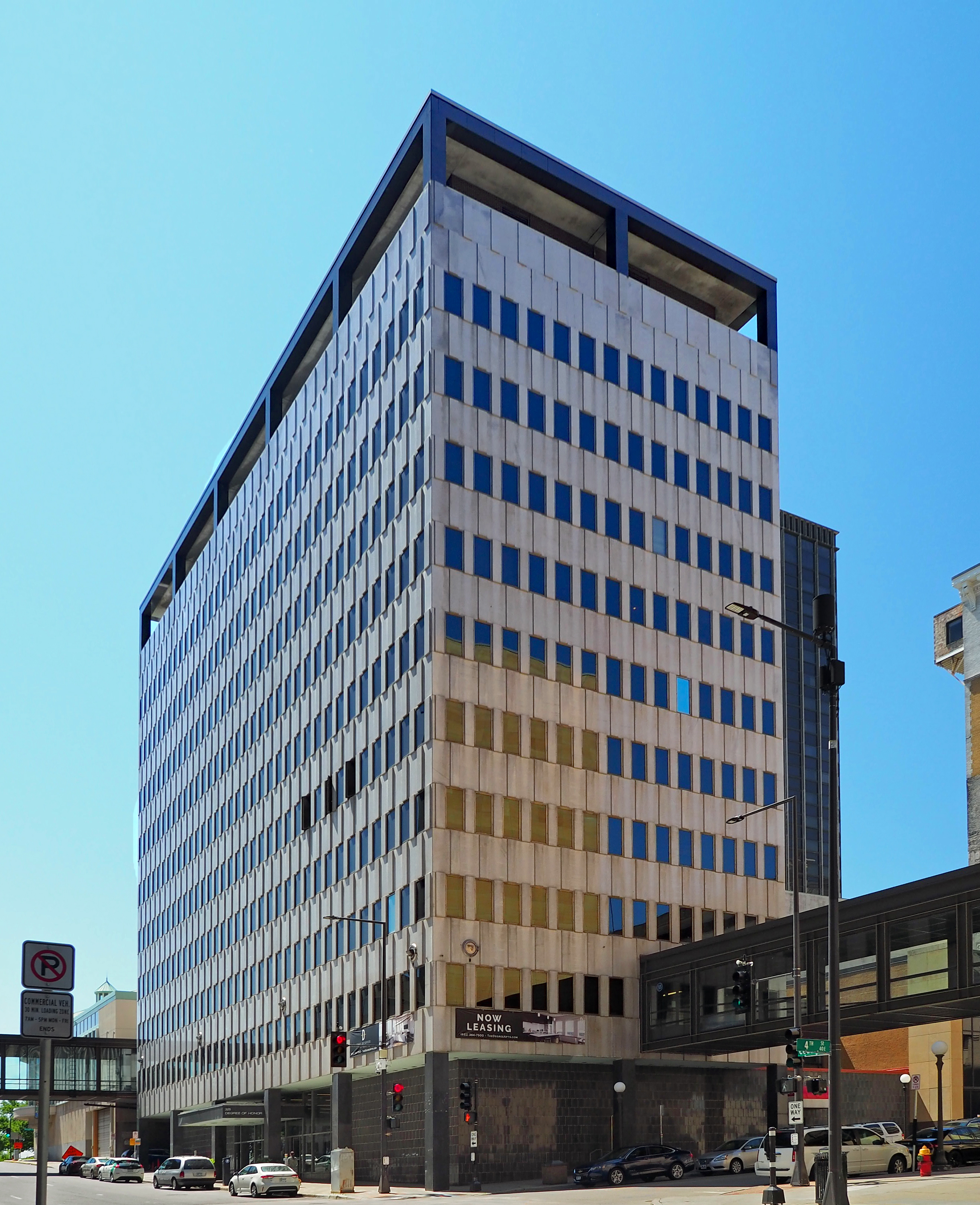
The former national headquarters of the Degree of Honor Protective Association, built in Saint Paul, Minnesota in 1961

The Degree of Honor Protective Association is a fraternal benefit society. It was originally organized as a female auxiliary to the Ancient Order of United Workmen, but split off in 1910 to become its own independent group. It merged with Catholic Financial Life in 2017.

== History ==
The Degree of Honor was established at the AOUW's first Supreme Lodge (national convention) at Cincinnati in February 1873. The Degree was open to the wives, widows, daughters, sisters, mothers, sons and brothers of members of the Order. A ritual was written by Dr. James Bunn, the founder of the AOUW, that provided for the creation of new lodges specifically for the degree. The Degree could also be applied by Subordinate Lodges of the Order, or in private to eligible individuals by duly qualified individuals. The first four or five lodges of the Degree itself were created in Pittsburgh and Allegheny, Pennsylvania in 1873 and 1874. In 1882 the Supreme Lodge of the AOUW granted permission for Grand Lodge Separate Beneficiary Jurisdictions to add a beneficiary feature to the Degree. The first Grand Lodge of the degree and the first to take advantage of the beneficiary feature was the Grand Lodge of Kansas, which was organized on May 20, 1890. A Superior Lodge of the degree to which the state Grand lodges were supposed to adhere to as the highest organ of the Degree was created in 1896. While this institution was subordinate to the Supreme lodge of the AOUW, there was never any financial connection between them, and the Degree of Honor became an independent organization in 1910

The Degree of Honor Protective Association Building in downtown St. Paul, Minnesota was built in 1961 and listed on the National Register of Historic Places in 2021.

== Membership ==
In 1896 the Degree reportedly had 40,000 members. In 1923 it had grown to 80,015.

According to the constitution that was operative in 1979, membership was open to any person of good moral character, who believed in a Supreme Being and was from sixteen to sixty-five years old. Applications for membership were voted on by the blackball system, with three black balls needed to reject a candidate. Non-insured social membership was also available.

== Organization ==
The organization had a three level structure, with local lodges electing delegates to state conventions, which in turn elect delegates to the annual convention. In 1917, the national headquarters was moved to St. Paul, Minnesota, and bought the Schiffman Building for $150,000 in the early 1920s.

By 1923 the group had 800 lodges spread throughout the country. Four Grand Lodges (state organizations), joined between 1920 and 1922 – Michigan, Iowa, Washington, and North Dakota. Independent groups remained in Massachusetts and Nebraska.

A junior department was created in 1926 and soon the society admitted men, though its national officers were all women in 1979. The group had 120,000 members in 1967 and 86,000 members in 390 local lodges in 1979.

In 2017, Degree of Honor merged with Catholic Financial Life and adopted its bylaws.

== Ritual ==
The group had an elaborate ritual based around its motto Talithi Cumi, Aramaic for "maid arise". The motto is taken from Mark 5:41, when Jesus speaks to a dead twelve-year-old girl. The ritual included prayers, a hymn ("Blest Be the Tie that Binds") and an altar and accented the group's three watchwords: constancy, honor, purity. The group also had its own burial service.

The meetings were opened with a prayer and a Protestant Bible was kept on the altar in the meeting place, though the name of Jesus was reportedly never stated. The group claimed to be "Christian in its teachings with out being sectarian...[and its] fundamental principle is the Golden Rule."

== See also ==
- List of North American fraternal benefit orders
