= Royal Neighbors of America =

American fraternal-benefit insurance organization

Official logo of Royal Neighbors of America

Royal Neighbors of America is a life insurance company targeted towards women.

== History ==
In 1888, Marie Kirkland of Council Bluffs, Iowa placed a notice in her town newspaper asking the wives of Modern Woodmen of America members to meet for a social get-together. Eight women responded and organized what was to become Royal Neighbors of America. A year later, the group reorganized as a social organization with a constitution, ritual, and articles of incorporation. The name Royal Neighbors of America was chosen by the women because they adhered to the biblical verse “For better is a neighbor that is near than a brother that is far.” (Proverbs 27:10)

Later, the idea of incorporating it as a fraternal benefit society was discussed. In 1894, it was decided to incorporate in the State of Illinois. Royal Neighbors was chartered as a fraternal benefit society on March 21, 1895. The first home office was located in Peoria, IL, and was moved to Rock Island, IL in 1908. By 1902, membership in the organization was 4,124. By 1920, membership was 400,000. In 1945 there were more than 500,000 members, with 5,640 local camps in 43 states and the District of Columbia.

== Role in women's suffrage movement ==
The organization was active in the women's suffrage movement in the United States. In their July 1923 membership magazine, they wrote:

For years we have been fighting for equal suffrage and the rights of women. Our Society was a pioneer in this work. We helped win the victory.

== Royal Neighbors Home ==
In 1931 the society opened the Royal Neighbors of America National Home on the west side of Davenport, Iowa. It was intended to help women in their organization who were in need of assistance. It was closed in 2004, with the property being sold in 2006. The facility was listed on the National Register of Historic Places in 2015.
