= American Latvian Association =

Latvian Americans organization based in USA

- Amerikas latviešu apvienība
- Abbreviation: ALA
- Formation: 1951
- Type: Nonprofit organization
- Legal status: 501 (c) (3) non-profit organization
- Headquarters: 400 Hurley Ave.
- Location: Rockville, MD 20850
- Members: 163 organizations 6,000 individuals
- President and Board Chair: Pēteris Blumbergs
- Website: alausa.org

The American Latvian Association (Latvian: Amerikas latviešu apvienība, ALA) is the main organization representing the Latvian American community in the United States of America, which was founded on February 24, 1951. The association and its members lead and support global efforts to facilitate the peaceful and democratic development of Latvia by promoting understanding and support for Latvia through informational efforts mainly in the United States of America.

In 1961, the ALA participated as a co-founder of the Joint Baltic American National Committee in cooperation with the Estonian American National Council and the Lithuanian American National Council. The ALA is also a member of the World Federation of Free Latvians (WFFL) and contributes 4 of WFFL's 16 board members.

ALA has over 160 member organizations, and some 6,000 individual members, representing over 100,000 people of Latvian descent living in the United States. ALA headquarters are located in Rockville, Maryland, a suburb of Washington, D.C.

Some of the 160 ALA member organizations include the cultural organization Tilts, the Washington D.C. Latvian Lutheran Church, and the Latvian Welfare Association Daugavas Vanagi New York branch. The ALA is a 501(c)(3) non-profit, tax exempt educational and cultural organization registered as a private and voluntary organization with the U.S. Agency for International Development.

ALA is organized into 4 key program areas as reported on the annual IRS Form 990 depicting the operations of non-profit organizations. The ALA supports cultural activities and facilitates cooperation within the Latvian American community, for example, organizing annual educational and cultural trips to Latvia. These programs help educate and inform the Latvian American Community about events and people in Latvia. The goals of the ALA are to promote the study of Latvian language, history and culture. The ALA is supplying Latvian schools in the United States with books and teaching materials, while also helping newly arrived Latvian immigrants to adjust to life in the United States and providing humanitarian aid to people in Latvia.

== History ==
The complete history of the ALA has been compiled in two books. The first book, ALA 35, 1951-1986 by former members Bruno Albats (former ALA General Secretary) and Visvaldis Varnesis Klīve (former President of the ALA) and was published in 1986. The second book, ALA 1986-2000 was written and published in 2000 by Anita Tērauda (former ALA General Secretary) and Irēne Karule.

These books provide an overview of the association and its founding process. As documented through the personal experiences of the authors, the initiator of the concept of a unified voice for the Latvian American community was the Latvian Ambassador to the United States (1948-1953), Jūlijs Feldmanis. On April 15, 1950, 79 representatives of some of the main centers of the Latvian diaspora in the US, such as New York, Chicago, Boston, Philadelphia, Washington D.C., Detroit etc., met to address the initiative. The representatives decided: (1) to create a nation-wide Latvian organization; (2) to define the organization's overall goals; and (3) to develop the organization's basic structure. The representatives established an organizing committee to draw up the organization's statutes and to call for a congress of delegates to formally establish the ALA.

Following the meeting in April 1950, Ambassador Feldmanis continued to work with the representatives of the main Latvian diaspora centers to create a unified Latvian organization. Numerous meetings were held in the various communities (most importantly, May 24, 1950, in Philadelphia and August 5, 1950, in New York) to gain local support and finalise the founding statutes. Mr. Feldmanis repeatedly stated that the main goal of the association will be the fight for Latvia's freedom.

115 delegates participated in the founding congress. They represented local Latvian organizations and churches in the U.S. with 11,260 members in total. Jūlijs Feldmanis was elected to lead the congress. After his proposal that the founding statutes be accepted without changes, the founding delegates agreed, officially establishing the ALA.
