= Wendy Luers =

American political activist

- Born: Wendy W. Woods
- Education: Stanford University (BA)
- Occupations: NGO executive, scholar, journalist, philanthropist
- Spouse: William H. Luers (m. 1979; died 2025)

Wendy W. Luers (née Wood) is an American political activist who is the founder and president of The Foundation for a Civil Society, a democratization and non-profit organization.

== Biography ==
Beyond her work with The Foundation for a Civil Society, she is also co-founder and co-chair of Beyond Conflict, formerly The Project on Justice in Times of Transition, an independent conflict resolution project working in collaboration with the Institute for Global Leadership at Tufts University. It was formerly an inter-faculty project at Harvard University affiliated with the Kennedy School of Government, the Law School and the Weatherhead Center for International Affairs. Beyond Conflict works around the world in places as varied as Kosovo, Colombia, the Philippines, and North Africa. In addition, Luers is currently the vice chair of the Latin American Program at the Woodrow Wilson Center for Scholars in Washington, D.C., and vice chair and founder of the Vaclav Havel Library Foundation.

A frequent publisher on issues of public diplomacy, including a piece in the Huffington Post on the soft power of art, Luers was also an international relations consultant for NYC 2012, the New York City bid for the 2012 Summer Games. She has been a journalist with Time, a commentator for KQED-TV, edited San Francisco Magazine, a former contributing editor of Vanity Fair and a free-lance writer and lecturer. Luers served as a local consultant to NBC's White Paper on "The Urban Crisis" in 1968–1969. She also was the director of special projects for Amnesty International (1975–1979) and Human Rights Watch (1987–1989).

== Committees and appointments ==
She was a presidential appointee of President Reagan to the National Council of the Arts (NEA) (1988–1994); designated by President Clinton as the chair of the NY White House Fellows Selection Committee; and founder and President Emerita of the Foundation for Art and Preservation in Embassies. She is a member of the Council on Foreign Relations and the Women's Foreign Policy Group; and served on the boards of The Freeman-Spogli Institute of International Studies at Stanford University (FSI) and the Institute for Global Leadership at Tufts University. She is vice chair of the Latin American Program at the Woodrow Wilson Center for Scholars and vice chair and co-founder of the Vaclav Havel Library Foundation. As well she serves currently on the boards of The Annenberg School for Communication and the Center on Communication Leadership & Policy (CCLP) at the University of Southern California (USC) and the Program Committee of the Sunnylands Trust established by Walter and Leonore Annenberg. She is a past board member of the World Childhood Foundation founded by Queen Silvia of Sweden.

She is also on the American Advisory Committee of the Ditchley Foundation, the Middle East Children's Institute and the Dag Hammerskjold Scholarship Fund for Journalists as well as numerous boards dealing with Central Europe. She was also a member of Presidential Delegation to observe the September 1996 Bosnian election, which was led by Hon. Richard Holbrooke.

Luers has been decorated by the foreign minister of the Czech Republic and the president of Slovakia for the Foundation for a Civil Society's contribution to civil society development.

== Personal life ==
Luers is a graduate of Stanford University with a degree in political science. She was married to William H. Luers, former president of the United Nations Association of the United States of America, former president of the Metropolitan Museum of Art and former United States Ambassador to Czechoslovakia (1983–1986) and Venezuela (1978–1982) from 1979 until his death in May 2025.
