= National Society for Hispanic Professionals =

The National Society for Hispanic Professionals (NSHP) is a United States–based non-government organization. According to its mission statement, it is "the mission of the National Society for Hispanic Professionals is to empower Hispanic professionals with information and connections." NSHP operates as a non-profit advocate for its members, empowering them with networking opportunities, career advice, scholarship information, and job fairs. NSHP has over 20,000 members as of July 2008.

== History ==
A native of Guatemala, Carolina Reyna founded NSHP in 2001 after moving to the United States to pursue her education in 1994. NSHP was created after Reyna started her own business and realized the lack of empowering organizations for Hispanic professionals. The evidence that Hispanics are under-represented in corporate America and Government furthered the need for such an organization.

== Membership ==
The organization's membership is primarily made of Hispanic Americans, however any individual regardless of race, national origin, religion, age, political affiliation, disability, sex, gender, or sexual orientation who is committed to the mission and vision of NSHP is eligible for membership.

== Activities ==
NSHP is best known for addressing issues affecting Hispanic Americans in professional careers through a multitude of initiatives, including organizing nationwide networking opportunities such as career fairs and seminars. The nationwide diversity job fair series, which travels to nine cities in 2008, is produced by NSHP and sponsored by LatPro. The national organization also oversees local chapters of the organization across the United States.

The organization also publishes Hispanic Professional News, a newsletter focusing on the goals and workplace challenges of Hispanic professionals. The newsletter, distributed monthly, is sent to every NSHP member.

== See also ==
- Hispanic
- Career
- Professional
