= Catholic Financial Life =

Milwaukee-based life insurer

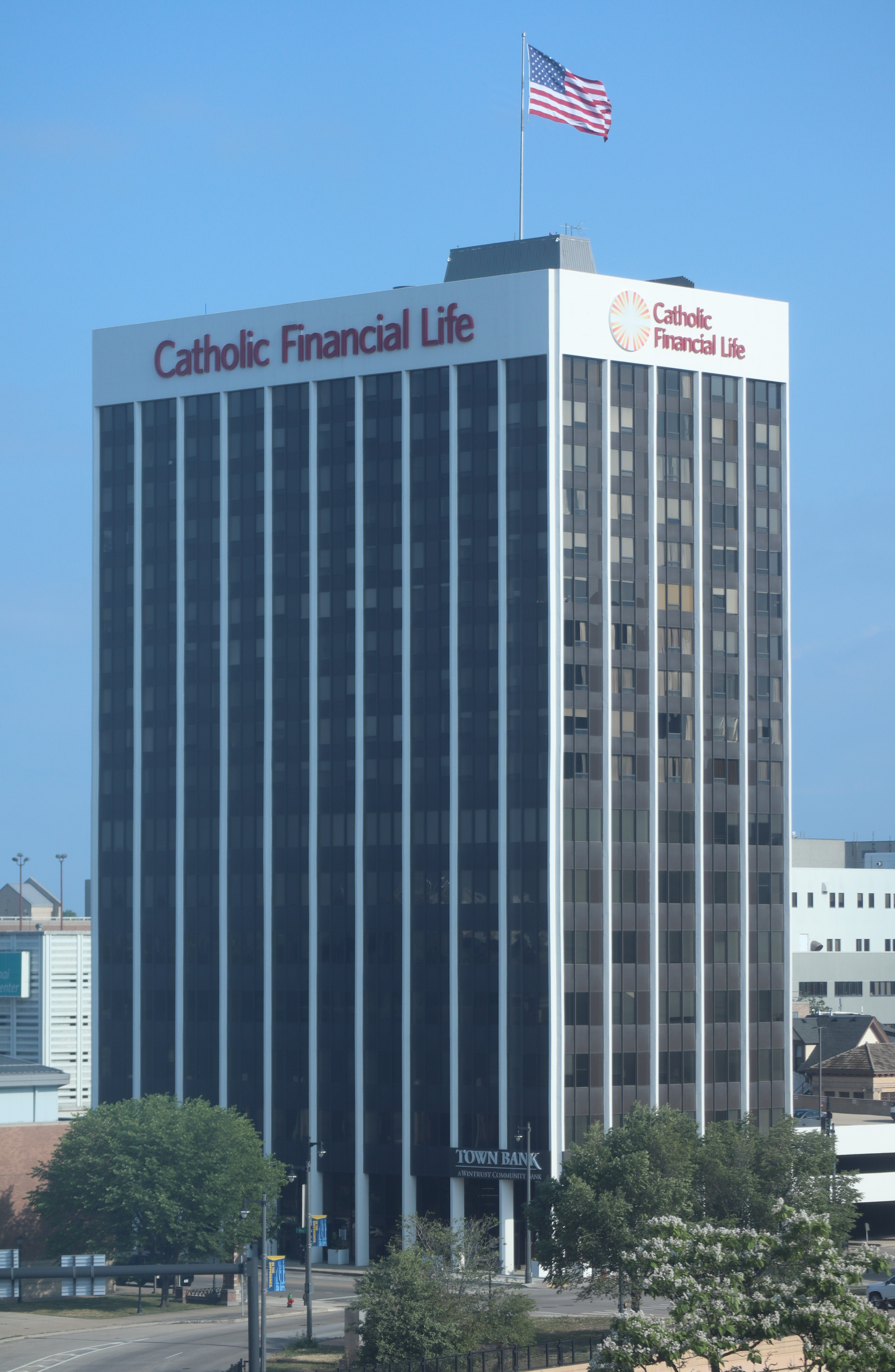
- Catholic Financial Life Tower in Milwaukee
- Formerly: Catholic Family Life Insurance
- Industry: Insurance
- Founded: 1868
- Headquarters: 1100 W. Wells Street; Milwaukee, Wisconsin
- Area served: United States
- Key people: Bill O'Toole (President & CEO)
- Website: catholicfinanciallife.org

Catholic Financial Life (CFL) is a Milwaukee-based life insurer and fraternal organization. It is one of the largest Roman Catholic not-for-profit financial services organizations in the United States, second only to the Knights of Columbus. Fraternal benefits societies are nonprofit membership organizations that designate a portion of their income for charity.

CFL was formed in 2010 with the merger of the Catholic Family Life Insurance (CFLI) with the Catholic Knights. The Catholic Knights was the result of a merger in 2005 of two other fraternal benefit organizations Catholic Knights of America and the Catholic Knights Insurance Society.

== Catholic Financial Life ==
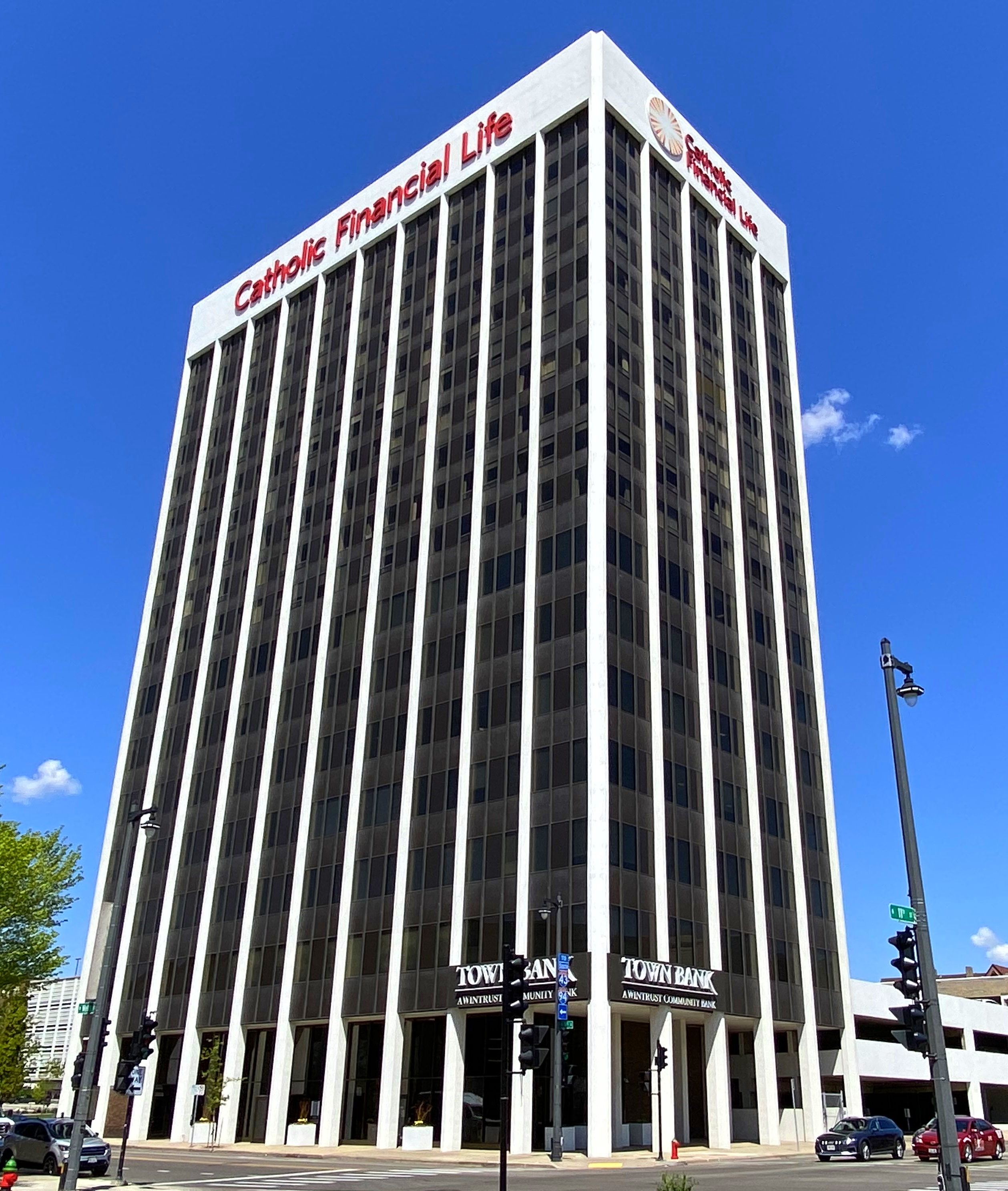
The tower seen from the ground.

In 2014 Catholic Financial Life posted a 50% increase in net income due to lower claims, an investment gain and other factors. It also saw a decrease in membership from 114,000 to about 112,000.

The Catholic Financial Life Building is among the tallest buildings in Milwaukee. The ground floor also contains the All Saints Chapel, dedicated in December 2010. A chapel contains hand-carved statues depicting patron saints of the ethnic groups who have played major roles in the fraternal benefits society. On June 15, 2015, the Milwaukee Journal Sentinel recognized CFL as one of 150 Top Workplaces for 2015, based solely upon employee surveys.

== History ==
=== Catholic Family Life Insurance ===
Catholic Family Life Insurance was founded in the State of Wisconsin in 1868 by the Most Rev. John Martin Henni, first Archbishop of Milwaukee. In August 1868, he gathered 21 men from a variety of occupations and they established The Family Protective Association.

The new organization was officially incorporated in March, 1869. As the oldest Catholic fraternal benefit society, CFLI would become the first to insure women and children, and first to provide Masses for living and deceased members. Over the years several societies merged with CFLI, including Rhode Island–based Union Saint-Jean-Baptiste in 1991, and Northern Fraternal Life, headquartered in Milwaukee, two years later. Its name changed to Catholic Family Life Insurance (CFLI) in 1949. At the time of merger with Catholic Knights, CFLI, with headquarters in the northern Milwaukee suburb of Shorewood, had a total of 45,000 members in 78 chapters located primarily in the upper Midwest and New England.

=== Catholic Knights of America ===
The Catholic Knights of America was a fraternal life-insurance company chartered under the laws of the State of Kentucky, U.S. The origins of the Catholic Knights of America dated from when James J. McLaughlin (a Catholic and a member of the Knights of Honor) attended an 1877 sermon by the Most Reverend Patrick A. Feehan (the Ordinary of the Nashville Diocese and future first Archbishop of Chicago). Bishop Feehan warned Catholics against joining secular fraternal orders. Moved by the sermon, McLaughlin decided to form a fraternal order that would be an alternative for Catholics. The initial meeting for the new organization was held at Emmett Hall on April 23, 1877. Branch No. 1 of the new group, the Order of United Catholics, received its charter from the State of Tennessee. The order changed its name to the Catholic Knights of Honor on June 5, and then, at the suggestion of Bishop Feehan, changed to Catholic Knights of America. The Order's patron saint, Saint Joseph, Protector of the Christian Home was chosen at the same time. It existed from 1877 to 2005 when it merged with the Catholic Knights Insurance Society to form the Catholic Knights, a financial services company.

In the next few years the CKA spread to West Virginia, Indiana and Ohio. The first national convention was held in Louisville, Kentucky, July 9–11, 1878. The organization very nearly came to an end in the late 1880s when an unscrupulous treasurer absconded with the groups funds. Luckily work by other official kept the Knights from going under and much of the money was recovered.

==== Membership ====
In 1896 the CKA was reported to have had 25,000 members. Membership was 21,000 in the late 1960s, 25,000 in the late 1960s and 17,000 in 1995.

==== Organization ====
Local units were called "branches", and the national structure was called the "Supreme Council", though it became known as the national convention by 1979. Headquarters were in St. Louis.

A "Uniform Rank" was founded in 1893, with men in Company A given paramilitary uniforms and women in Company C given white dresses and dark blazers. A female auxiliary was established in 1895, which had its own sessions and met jointly with the male branches on "occasions of a social nature." Women were allowed into the Order in their own right in 1916 and in 1952 women were elected as both national secretary and on a seat on the Supreme Board. A juvenile department was founded in 1929.

==== Activities ====
The Catholic Knights activities other than insurance included scholarships for seminarians, distribution of rosaries and New Testaments, anti-abortion rights activism and photo essay and poster contests. The Catholic Knights Insurance Company also participated in educational and social programs, including "Catholic Action" activities.

=== Catholic Knights Insurance Society ===
The Order increased "spectacularly" in the state of Wisconsin, so much so that its membership outgrew the national organization and a disproportionate amount of premiums collected in the state went to benefit members elsewhere. When the national organization rejected a call to create regional rates, the Order of the Catholic Knights of Wisconsin was founded on January 21, 1885, to concentrate on insurance activities. In 1958 this order changed its name to the Catholic Knights Insurance Society.

Another group, the Catholic Knights of Ohio, was formed in 1891.

== Mergers and acquisitions ==
In 2005 the Catholic Knights of American merged with the Catholic Knights Insurance Society to form the Catholic Knights. On April 1, 2010, Catholic Knights then merged with Catholic Family Life Insurance to create Catholic Financial Life. At the time of the merger the CK had 85,000 members in 141 branches in 17 states.

In early 2017, Catholic Financial acquired Degree of Honor Protective Association out of St. Paul, Minnesota. The move added about 40,000 members and $569 million of insurance.

== Philanthropy ==
In 2008, Catholic Financial announced a national partnership with the Society of Saint Vincent de Paul. CFL began sponsoring the Society's "Friends of the Poor Walk" shortly thereafter. By 2015, CFL chapter members had volunteered 126,000 hours of service and raised over $1 million for the Society.

In 2015 CFL partnered with Milwaukee Habitat for Humanity’s efforts to revitalize the Washington Park neighborhood. It also provided a matching grant to the Poy Sippi Library to replace the carpet in the library.
