= Julian Niemczyk =

American diplomat

Julian Martin Niemczyk (August 26, 1920 – September 16, 2009) was an American diplomat.

Born in Fort Sill, Oklahoma, Niemczyk served in the U.S. Army and Air Force, rising to the rank of colonel. He studied at first at the University of Oklahoma before service in World War II and eventually graduated from the University of the Philippines in 1955. In the 1970s and 1980s he was active in the Republican National Committee. Nominated by President Ronald Reagan, he served as the United States Ambassador to Czechoslovakia from 1986 to 1989.
