= Maude Rhoderick =

American computer

Maude Clara Rhoderick (1882 – 1966) was a Smithsonian Astrophysical Observatory computer and Fisheries Bureau clerk.

== Early life and education ==
Rhoderick was born in 1882 in Washington, D.C. Maude, also reported in the press as "Maud" and "Clara Maud" and occasionally with the surname "Roderick," was the second daughter of Elbridge Perry Rhoderick and Martha Virginia Rhoderick. Elbridge was the Chief of the Division of Contracts in the Office of the Second Assistant Postmaster General under Postmaster General George von Lengerke Meyer.

Rhoderick participated regularly in Washington, D.C. society in the first two decades of the twentieth century, hosting events including wedding showers and attending gatherings reported in the Society pages of the Washington Herald and Washington Evening Star newspapers. She graduated from the (Washington) Business High School in 1901, with a ceremony held at the National Theatre with music from the Marine Band. In 1908, she was noted as a bookkeeper living in NW DC in what is now considered the U Street Shaw/Cardozo neighborhood, across the street from Westminster Park.

Rhoderick was an active member of the Odd Fellows, or the Independent Order of Odd Fellows. In 1913, she was a member of the Miriam lodge, No.6, which became the youngest lodge to be conferred Rebekahs degree and was installed as financial secretary within its officers group. Rhoderick served in official roles in the Miriam lodge at varying intervals, including as installing officer in 1918 where she presided over the installation of new officers in the Mounth Pleasant Lodge and while efforts were made to raise funds for the war.

== Career ==
Rhoderick worked as a computer for the Smithsonian Astrophysical Observatory at points between the years 1922-1931. Most notably in 1927, Rhoderick was serving as a computer while she and her colleagues would have been working on observations to determine the solar constant of radiation.

Rhoderick was appointed junior clerk CAF 2-1 in March 1928 for the Department of Commerce in the Bureau of Fisheries. She resigned the post in May 1929.

== Death ==
Rhoderick died in 1966 in Washington, D.C. She was interred with her sister Mrs. Lillian Rhoderick Deland in Glenwood Cemetery in Washington, D.C. Her parents Elbridge P. and Martha Virginia Rhoderick are also buried in Glenwood Cemetery.
