= List of fraternal auxiliaries and side degrees =

Fraternal orders often have "side degrees", auxiliaries or appendant (as opposed to primary). Some of these are created as female "sister organizations", youth organizations or side degrees proper which are organizations associated with or within the larger organization.

== AHEPA ==
The American Hellenic Educational Progressive Association or AHEPA, has three auxiliaries

- Daughters of Penelope
- Sons of Pericles
- Maids of Athena

== Ancient Order of United Workmen ==
- Degree of Honor Protective Association – originally the female auxiliary of the Ancient Order of United Workmen
- Order of Mogullians – a side degree of the Ancient Order of United Workmen. It was said to provide "amusement as well as substantial benefits".

== Elks ==
The Benevolent and Protective Order of Elks banned auxiliaries and side degrees in 1907, but unofficial female and youth auxiliaries have still been founded at the local level. Furthermore, female auxiliaries are recognized by the Elks of Canada and the African-American Improved Benevolent and Protective Order of Elks of the World

- Antlers – for young men under 21. Despite the ban on auxiliaries the creation of this youth group was approved by the Grand Lodge session of 1927, though it had been operating at the local level in San Francisco since 1922. After the membership declined during World War II, the Grand Lodge deleted all reference to the Antlers in its Constitution and Statutes.
- Benevolent and Protective Order of the Does – unofficial female Auxiliary operating at the local level.
- Lady Elks – unofficial female Auxiliary operating at the local level.
- Order of Royal Purple &– Canadian female auxiliary, open to women over 18 who have a close male family member who is an Elk
- Daughters of the Improved Benevolent and Protective Order of Elks of the World – official auxiliary of the African American version of the order.
- Emblem Club of the United States of America – founded in 1926 as an organization of female relatives of Elks. Effectively operates as the Elks unofficial auxiliary.
- Sons of Idle Rest – founded in the 1890s, this was a side degree of the Benevolent and Protective Order of Elks. Its purpose was largely "recreative" and for the elaboration of ceremony. Attempts to trace the organization in the early 1920s were in vain.

== Foresters ==
- Junior Foresters of America - organization for youths 12–18 years of age, attached to the Foresters of America. Also said to be an outgrowth of the English Juvenile Foresters.
- Knights of Sherwood Forest - an appendant degree of the Foresters of America established in 1879 in St. Louis. It was described as both a "benevolent" as well as a semi-military or uniformed group within the Foresters. It was recognized as the second level degree for the organization at the Philadelphia Subsidiary High Court in 1883. At the time the Knights numbered some 1,700 in 50 Subordinate Conclaves governed by a Supreme Conclave of the World. It was extinct by the early 1920s.

== Freemasonry ==
- Order of the Eastern Star
- Prince Hall Order of the Eastern Star
- Societas Rosicruciana in Anglia & Societas Rosicruciana
- Order of DeMolay
- Job's Daughters International
- International Order of the Rainbow for Girls
- Desoms, Deaf Sons of Master Masons - this unique auxiliary was founded in Washington in 1946 for deaf male of good moral character who were related to Master Masons.
- Knights of Pythagoras - Prince Hall affiliated youth group for boys 9–20

=== Shriners ===
- Ancient Arabic Order of the Nobles of the Mystic Shrine, now known as the Shriners International
  - Royal Order of Jesters - an invitation only organization open to Shriners.
  - Daughters of the Nile - This organization was founded in Seattle on February 20, 1913, and was originally meant for the wives, daughters, sisters, mothers and widows of the Nobles of the Mystic Shrine. Today it is open to women 18 and older who are related by birth or marriage to a Shriner, Master Mason, or Daughter of the Nile, or is a majority member in Good Standing of a Masonic-related organization for girls; or who was a patient, with or without Shrine or Masonic relationship, at a Shriners Hospital for Children. Like the other female groups related to the Shriners, they focus their work on the Shriners Children's Hospitals, including raising millions of dollars through their endowment funds, volunteering at the hospitals, sewing quilts and clothes and donating toys, games and educational materials.
  - Ladies Oriental Shrine of North America - The first court of this women's Shrine related organization was founded in Wheeling, West Virginia in 1903. After two other courts were formed, a national organization was formed on June 24, 1914. However, the LOSNA did not become legally incorporated until 1954. Unlike many male fraternal orders, the LOSNA grew in membership in the latter decades of the 20th century. They had 24,000 members in the mid-1960s, 30,000 members in the mid-1970s and 32,000 in 1994. Today they claim 16,000 members in 76 Courts across North America. Membership is open to women who are at least 18 years old, related to a Noble of Shriners International, or a Master Mason by birth, marriage or adoption or be sponsored by two members of the Ladies' Oriental Shrine of North America. Local organizations are called Subordinate Courtd are headed by a High Priestess. The overall organization is the Grand Council headed by a Grand High Priestess.
  - Shrine Guilds of America - Founded in 1947 by the wives of Shriners of the Murat Temple of Indianapolis. The group currently has 14 local Guilds, located mostly in Indiana and Florida, and concentrates its work on helping the Shriners Hospitals for Children, particularly educating children during their time at the hospital. Membership is open to the wives and widows of Shriners. Local Guild presidents are called Maharanees. The president of the Imperial Council of Shrine Guilds of America is denoted the Imperial Maharanee.
- Ancient Egyptian Arabic Order of the Nobles of the Mystic Shrine - an African American version of the order, founded by a group of Prince Hall Masons in 1893 in Chicago.
  - The Imperial Court, formerly the Daughters of Isis

=== Other Masonic side degrees ===
- Mystic Order of Veiled Prophets of the Enchanted Realm (also known as the grotto)
  - Daughters of Mokanna - founded in 1919, lodges called Caldrons, overall organization "Supreme Cauldron" and the chief officer the Supreme Might Chosen One. Had about 5,000 members in 1994. Devotes its good work programs to cerebral palsy and dentistry for the handicapped.
  - Mysterious Order of the Witches of Salem - Less information is available about this auxiliary. They were apparently founded sometime before 1915, and reported active as late as the early 1940s by Noel P. Gist. Their locals were likewise called "Cauldrons".
- Tall Cedars of Lebanon
- Ye Antient Order of Noble Corks

== Kiwanis ==
- Aktion Club - for people with disabilities
- Kiwaniannes - former female auxiliary of the Kiwanis, before women were allowed into the main club in 1987. Some still exist at local level

=== Youth and schools ===
- K-Kids - for elementary school students
- Builders Club - for middle school students
- Circle K International - collegiate auxiliary
- Key Club - youth auxiliary of the Kiwanis
- Kiwanis Junior - part of the European Service Leadership Program for people ages 18–35

== Knights of Columbus ==
- Columbiettes
- Daughters of Isabella
- Columbian Squires
- Squire Roses
- Catholic Daughters of the Americas - originally a female auxiliary of the K of C, now an independent group
- International Order of Alhambra - modeled after the Shriners, this organization kept the Islamic parody motif and was originally open only to members of the Knights of Columbus of the Third or Fourth Degree.
- Mystic Nobles of Granada - this was an earlier side degree that was active in the early 1910s. Locals were apparently called "caravans", meeting "Khalifates", and the general convention the "Grand Khalifat". It was considered an "offshoot of the Alhambra" Both were clarified to be independent of and not related to the Knights of Columbus Board of Directors in April 1913.

== Knights of Pythias ==
- Dramatic Order of the Knights of Khorassan
  - Nomads of Avrudaka - a female auxiliary to the Dramatic Order of the Knights of Khorassan.
- Knights of the Orient - Also known as the Ancient Order of the Knights of the Orient or the Orientals. This was a side degree conferred "mostly" to the Knights of Pythias. The professed aim of the order was to "improved the condition of mankind". It also claimed that in the Order there was no discrimination on the basis of political or religious belief, or of wealth. Its ritual was discovered and published by the National Christian Association, as well as in Peter Rosens' The Catholic church and secret societies. The head of a local lodge was called a Grand Chief Orient; other officers were the Grand Vice Orient, Grand Prophet (chaplain) and Grand Marshall. A splinter group called the Ancient Order of the Sanhedrims broke from this in 1895 and offered a benefit to members of "some secret societies in good standing."
- Knights of Pythias of North America, South America, Europe, Asia, Africa and Australia, an African-American organization.

== Maccabees ==
- Knights of the Maccabees
- Ladies of the Maccabees of the World - founded in 1885.
- North American Benefit Association - founded as the Ladies of the Modern Maccabees after schism within the above in 1892. Changed name to Women's Benefit Association in 1915 and the present name in 1966.

== Odd fellows ==
- Junior Lodges
- Daughters of Rebekah
  - Theta Rho Girls
  - Ladies of the Orient - Originally an appendant body for the Rebekahs but now operating independently.
- Ancient Mystic Order of Samaritans - Negotiations between the Imperial Order of Muscovites and the Oriental Order of Humility and Perfection for a merger began as early as 1917. By 1923 plans were drawn up as to how the orders were to be amalgamated and this was officially commenced in August 1924 when they formed the United Order of Splendor and Perfection. However this group was beset by internal strife and was reorganized the next year as the Ancient Mystic Order of Samaritans. While never officially recognized by the Independent Order of Odd Fellows, it has been acknowledged unofficially. In 1995 it had 3,953 members. Has two degrees, Humility and Perfection. Officers include Supreme Kalifah, Supreme Ali-Baba and Supreme Muezzin. Publishes the quarterly AMOS Realm
- Ancient Mystic Order of Cabirians - merged with the rest in 1924.
- Imperial Order of Muscovites
- Knights of Oriental Splendor -
- Veiled Prophets of Baghdad - reported active in 1922, merged with the rest in 1924.
- Oriental Order of Humility and Perfection - began in the 1880s as simply the "Oriental" side degree in Ontario, Canada. It was organized into a "Grand Orient of Oriental Order of Humility and Perfection" on August 13, 1901, with the approval of the existing "sanctorums". It was incorporated in New York state on February 5, 1919, and began to grow in the United States. Its motto was "We never sleep" and advanced members were awarded the "Sheik" degree, which allowed them to wear a red tassel on their fez. The ritual of the Order was based on the life of Xerxes I, son of Darius I of the Ancient Persian Empire.
- Grand United Order of Odd Fellows in America, Black organization
  - Household of Ruth

== Redmen ==
- Degree of Hiawatha
- Degree of Pocahontas
  - Degree of Anona
- National Haymakers' Association - a side degree of the Improved Order of Red Men.

== Woodmen ==
- Neighbors of Woodcraft
- Royal Neighbors of America - originally the auxiliary of the Modern Woodmen of America, before it became its own group.
- Woodmen Circle - a former auxiliary of the Woodmen of the World, this group merged with Woodmen of the World Life Insurance Society in 1965.
- Woodman Rangers and Rangerettes - founded in 1903, open to boys and girls ages 8–15.

== Other groups ==
- Daughters of America - a female auxiliary of the Junior Order of United American Mechanics, itself originally the youth auxiliary of the Order of American Mechanics
- Daughters of Scotia - established as the female auxiliary of the Order of Scottish Clans
- Leo clubs - youth auxiliary of the Lions Clubs International
- Women of the Moose - affiliated with Moose International
- Ancient Mystic Order of the Bagmen of Baghdad - a side degree of the Order of United Commercial Travelers of America established at Cincinnati in 1892. It was organized into Subordinate Guilds that reported to the Imperial Guild at Cincinnati. On "festive occasions" members would wear uniforms "resembling those of Turkish soldiers." Activities included marching in parades and providing burial services for members. Many of the rituals and ceremonies of the order apparently feel out of use after the 1970s. Membership was 4,000 in the mid-1960s, 6,600 in the mid-1970s and stayed around 6,000 from the mid-1980s to 1994.
- Melters - a side degree of the Tribe of Ben-Hur. Thy claimed to be the "funniest side degree known to fraternalism".
- Priests of Demeter - a side degree of the National Grange.
