= Ladies of the Orient =

North American women's fraternal organization

The Ladies of the Orient (LOTO) is a women's fraternal organization in the United States and Canada. It originated as an appendant body to the Rebekahs in Syracuse, New York in 1915. Although LOTO has a close relationship with the Odd Fellows appendant body known as the Ancient Mystic Order of Samaritans, it is an independent organization founded entirely by women.

== History ==
The Ladies of the Orient is a women's fraternal organization that originatec as an appendant body to the Rebekahs. Its first unit, Pioneer Zuanna No. 1 was founded in Syracuse, New York in 1915 by Emily Voorheis for the purpose of having a group dedicated to recreation and amusement as a pleasant diversion from the serious charitable work done by other groups to which the ladies already belonged.

While it has a close relationship with the Odd Fellows appendant body known as the Ancient Mystic Order of Samaritans, the Ladies of the Orient is not a true women’s auxiliary. Rather, it is an independent organization founded entirely by women and requiring no affiliation with its men’s counterpart.

The fraternal organization was incorporated in the State of New York in 1921 under the name Supreme Royal Zuanna of the Mystic Degrees of Persecution and Purification Ladies of the Orient of United States and Canada. The organization established units in the United States and Canada. As with the Ancient Mystic Order of Samaritan, the Ladies of the Orient has a particular charitable focus on Cognitive disabilities.

== Symbols and traditions ==
Local units of the Ladies of the Orient are referred to as "zuannas" and are presided over by a "Great Ashayhi." The basic regalia of the Ladies of the Orient is a white fez with the letter "Z" inside a triangle and crescent bearing a yellow tassel. The letter "Z" represents "zuanna".

There is also a more advanced fez and tassel colors for higher-ranked members, such as a white fez with a purple tassel for Past Ashayhis.
