= Imperial Order of Muscovites =

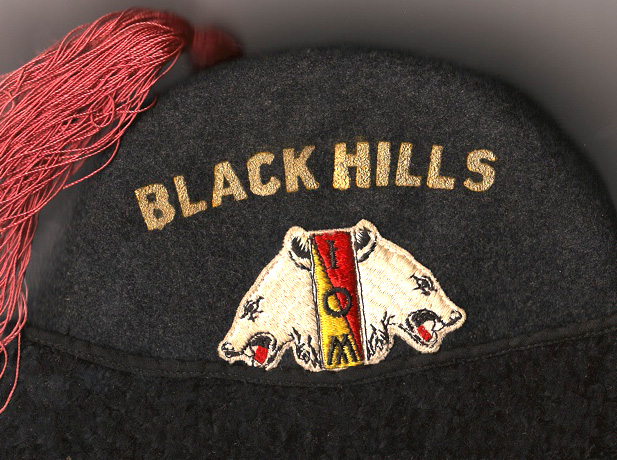
A fez of the Imperial Order of Muscovites.

The Imperial Order of Muscovites was an unofficial, unrecognized appendant body to the Independent Order of Odd Fellows in the United States, founded in 1894 in Cincinnati, Ohio, and lasting until about 1921.

The order apparently stirred controversy within the Independent Order of Odd Fellows. Minutes from the Grand Lodge of Illinois in 1910, record that all odd fellows were commanded to abandon their membership in the Imperial Order of Muscovites, and that further membership in the body would result in expulsion from Independent Order of Odd Fellows itself. The latest Kremlins were instituted in 1921.

Many local bodies of the order were absorbed, along with those of other appendant Odd Fellow organizations into the Ancient Mystic Order of Samaritans., while others continued to exist independently as late as until 1934. One chapter in Oregon survived under a new name until the 1960s. Klaus Scherer, a former member and former grand master of Oregon Odd Fellows, preserved their ceremonies until he and his son revived the degrees as a charity fundraiser open to anyone.

== Organization ==
Although not under the jurisdiction of the Independent Order of Odd Fellows, membership in the Muscovites was open only to Odd Fellows.

The basic body or unit of the order was called a Kremlin, with officers styled as Czar, Patriarch, Regent, Commander, and so forth. The body governing the order was known as the Supreme Kremlin and included an Imperial Czar, Imperial Regent, Imperial Grand Duke, Imperial Governor, Imperial Counselor, Imperial Minister of Records, Imperial Minister of Finance, Imperial Custodian, Imperial Inspector, Imperial Inner Guard, Imperial Outer Guard, and multiple Chancellors.

== Ceremonies ==
As described in 1933, the initiation for the group consisted of "obstacles met and overcome by exiles to Siberia" with the proceedings consisting of "a burlesque on the former Russian government." Live bears were known to be used in the order's ceremonies.

== Regalia ==
The membership regalia of the order was a charcoal grey fez with a black band of fur around the brim, emblazoned with an emblem representing two bear heads flanking a banner of red and yellow, divided diagonally, with the legend "IOM" arranged vertically. It was referred to by the membership as a Russian busby.

== Controversy and disbandment ==
The order apparently engendered controversy within Odd Fellowship, and it was eventually disbanded. Minutes from the Grand Lodge of Illinois for 1910 record that all Odd Fellows were commanded to abandon their membership in the Imperial Order of Muscovites, and that further membership in the body would result in expulsion from the parent body.

The latest Kremlins were instituted in 1921.

Portions of the order were apparently absorbed, along with other appendant Odd Fellows bodies, into the Ancient Mystic Order of Samaritans. Due to disagreements among the members, however, others remained separate and continued to hold social events as well as initiate new members as late as 1934. The remnants of the IOM experienced financial difficulties and went into receivership in 1933.

== Revival ==
Claus Scheer, a former member and former grand master of Oregon Odd Fellows, preserved their ceremonies in a Portland Odd Fellows lodge. He, his son David, and others adjusted the ritual to be appropriate to a modern audience and be inclusive of women. It was performed in April 2015 as a charity fundraising event. The revived order, renamed the Noble Order of Muscovites, now performs the degree for any organization that donates proceeds collected for the performance to charity. It has since been performed in front of charitable and Masonic organizations, including virtually during the COVID-19 pandemic.

== See also ==
- Ancient Mystic Order of Samaritans
