= Elizabeth McCreight Hutchison =

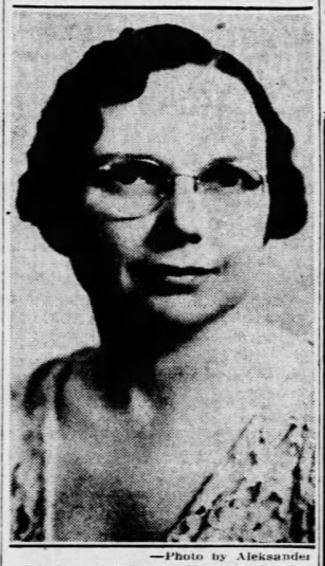
Elizabeth Ivy McCreight Hutchison

Elizabeth Ivy McCreight Hutchison (May 26, 1901 – October 1986) was the president of the Teachers College Y. W. C. A.

== Early life ==
Elizabeth Ivy was born in Phoenix, Arizona, on May 26, 1901, the daughter of James Pleasant Ivy (1864-1939) and Vernettie Oscar Greene (1876-1967).

She graduated from Tempe Teachers' College.

== Career ==
Elizabeth McCreight Hutchison was in the original faculty staff at the Tolleson Union High School, established in 1927. She was the president of the Teachers College Young Women's Christian Association.

She was a member of the Zetetic Society, a modern flat Earth society.

== Personal life ==
Elizabeth Ivy married Robert Littleton McCreight and they had one son, Robert Ivy McCreight, a graduate of University of Southern California. They lived at Route No. 3, Phoenix, Arizona. On August 4, 1937, she remarried to rancher Sam M. Hutchison (1898-1982).

She died in October 1986 and is buried at Greenwood/Memory Lawn Mortuary & Cemetery, Phoenix.
