= Imperial Court (Freemasonry) =

Black masonic women's auxiliary

- Egyptian goddess Isis with cow horn symbol
- Formation: August 24, 1910; 116 years ago
- Founded at: Detroit
- Type: Masonic women's auxiliary
- Headquarters: 2239 Democrat Road; Memphis, Tennessee 38132
- Location: United States
- Website: doipha.org
- Formerly called: Daughters of Isis

The Imperial Court organization serves as the female auxiliary to the Ancient Egyptian Arabic Order of the Nobles of the Mystic Shrine, the Prince Hall affiliated Shriners. The group previously used the name Daughters of Isis.

== History ==
Local groups of the Imperial Court were founded by African American women in the early years of the twentieth century in Maryland, Rhode Island and Washington, D.C. In 1909, representatives of these locals met with a committee from the Prince Hall Shriners and formally requested the formation of a national organization of female relatives of the Ancient Egyptian Arabic Order Nobles of the Mystic Shrine. The establishment was approved at the annual convention of the Shrine held in Detroit, Michigan, on August 24, 1910. At the group's inception, it had twelve local chapters.

In 2010, the group held their centennial celebration. In 2014, the organization changed names to avoid confusion with an unrelated terrorist group.

== Organization ==
Local organizations are called "courts" and the national organization is called the Imperial Court. There were 12,000 members in 184 courts in 1979. The international organization includes courts in the United States, Canada, the Bahamas, Germany, Italy, South Korea, and Japan."

The organizations' rituals are based on the Egyptian legends of Isis. Local courts hold events to raise money for charity.

== See also ==
- Ancient Egypt in the Western imagination
- List of fraternal auxiliaries and side degrees
- Howard University interviewed a few of its members.
