= Degree of Pocahontas =

Female auxiliary of an American fraternal order

The Degree of Pocahontas are the female auxiliary of the Improved Order of Red Men, an American fraternal order. Despite using names based on common non-Native ideas about Native Americans, it was formed solely by and for white women. Membership is now open to patriotic American women of every race.

== History ==
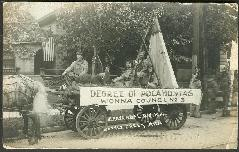
Degree of Pocahontas float in the Fraternal Day Parade, 1914, Battle Creek, Michigan

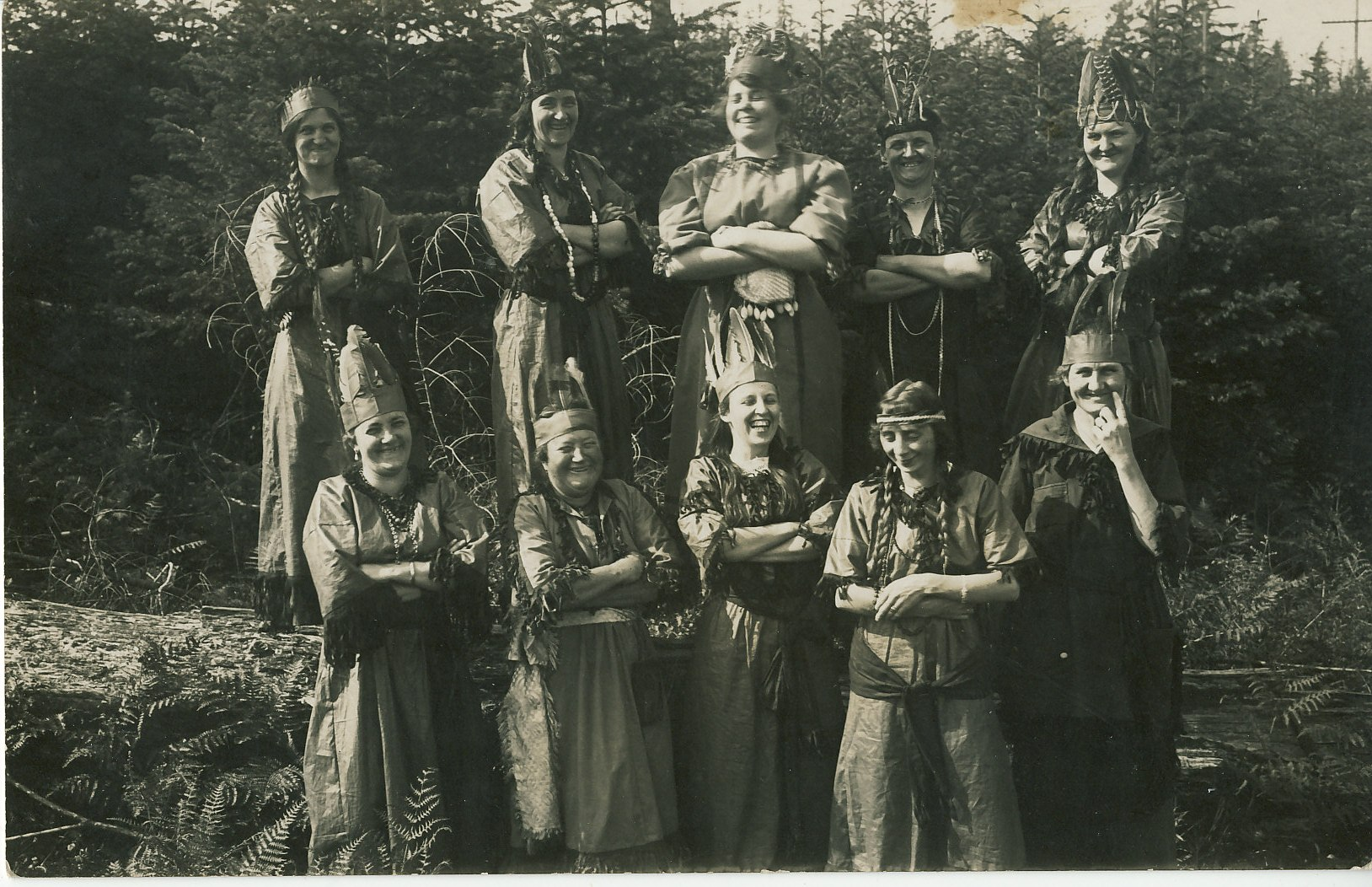
Members of The Pocahontas Degree

The Degree was founded in Elmira, New York. The idea of creating a female Degree was first broached in the early 1850s, however it wasn't until the IORMs "Great Council" of 1885 that Degree was approved. The first local chapter was the Wenonah Council, #1 of Philadelphia, whose "Council Fire was lighted on the 28th Sleep of Cold Moon, G. S. D. 396 (February 28, 1887) at the 828 Red Men's Wigwam Race Street in that city."

== Organization ==
Local units are called "Councils" and meeting places "Tepees". The president of a local Council is called "Pocahontas" and is assisted by a "Powatan", a male counselor. The immediate past president is called a "Prophetess". Other officials of a local Council include the "Wenonah", the "Keeper of Wampum" and the "Keeper of Records". The state level of the organization is similar to the local level. Statewide organizations are called "Great Councils" and their presidents are called "Great Pocahontases". The National Degree of Pocahontases is made up of Past Great Pocahontases and elects a Board of Great Chiefs from its number. The Board of Great Chiefs consists of seven officers: "National Pocahontas", "National Wenonah", "National Minnehaha", " National Prophetess", "National Keeper of Records", "National Keeper of Wampum" and "National Collector of Wampum". This board operates under the supervision and authority of the Great Council of the United States of the IORM.

A youth auxiliary was founded in 1952, the Degree of Anona. This degree was not very popular, however, mustering only 90 local Councils and less than 5,000 members in 1979, principally in New England.

== Membership ==
In 1907 the Degree had 26,000 members. As of January 1, 1921, the Degree claimed 120,000 members, averaging approximately 70 per each Council. In 1977 there were 22,827 members which represented a drop of 1,731 from the previous "two Great Suns", or two years.

In the early 1920s, membership was open only to white women over 18, who were of good moral character and "a firm belief evidenced by life and act, and not mere declaration alone in the existence in the Great Spirit – God – in whose hands all power is, and to whom all are accountable."

== Ritual ==
The order has a secret ritual, signs and passwords. New members are required to attend an initiation ceremony. The Degree's sign of recognition was a right hand raised to face level with the two fore fingers extended, the last two fingers closed, and the thumb on the third finger, signifying "Who are you?" The correct answer was the same gesture with the left hand meaning "A friend".

== Political activity ==
They have provided financial support to fight communism.

== See also ==
- Playing Indian by Philip J. Deloria – A critical history of the main organization, Improved Order of Red Men and similar organizations
- Cultural appropriation
- Cultural imperialism
- Kibbo Kift
- Legend of the Rainbow Warriors
- Noble savage
- Plastic shaman
- Stereotypes of Native Americans
- Woodcraft Indians
