= Vernettie O. Ivy =

American politician (1876–1967)

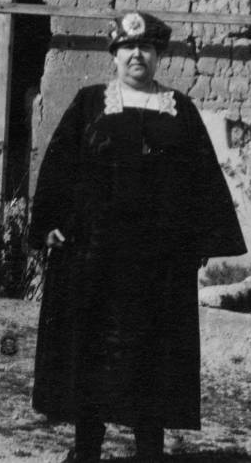
Vernettie O. Ivy

Vernettie Oscar Greene Ivy (January 1, 1876 – July 15, 1967) was an American clubwoman and politician who served a member of the Arizona House of Representatives.

== Early life ==
Vernettie Oscar Greene was born on January 1, 1876, in Blackburn, Missouri.

She attended Tempe Normal School, Arizona.

== Career ==
Vernettie O. Ivy was very active and prominent in fraternal circles.

She was a member of the Arizona House of Representatives for six years: in 1923 she was one of Maricopa County, Arizona's representatives in the Arizona General Assembly. She was a delegate to the Democratic National Convention in New York City in 1924. Together with C. Louise Boehringer, she co-sponsored a bill which purpose was to develop a child state welfare law; once the legislation passed, "mandated state money" had to be used for county welfare boards aimed to aid widowed women with young children.

She was the president of the Central Arizona District Federation of Women's Clubs and the Rebekah Assembly of Arizona. She was a matron of the Order of the Eastern Star. She was a member of the Phoenix Woman's Club and the Fowler Woman's Club. Additionally, in 1941 she was the President of the Arizona United Daughters of the Confederacy.

She was chairman of the State Child Welfare Board, of the Public Welfare and Public Health and Statistics committee. She was a member of the High School Board.

== Personal life ==
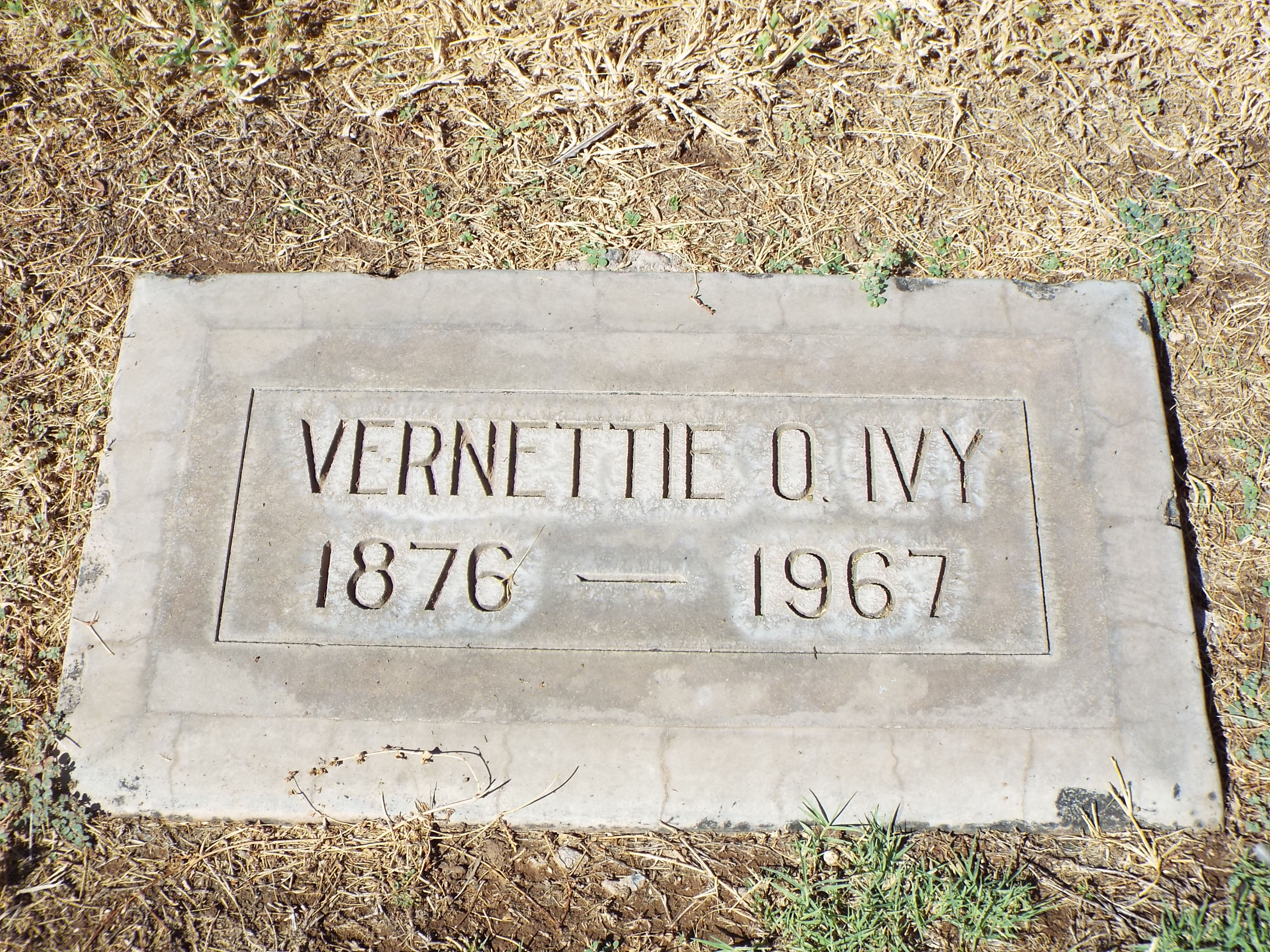
Grave-site of Vernettie O. Ivy

Vernettie O. Ivy moved to Arizona in 1895 and lived at R.F.D. 3, Phoenix, Arizona.

On August 4, 1897, she married James Pleasant Ivy (1864–1939), Arizona territorial representative, and they had one daughter, Elizabeth Ivy McCreight Hutchison (1901–1986).

She died on July 15, 1967, and is buried with her husband at Greenwood/Memory Lawn Mortuary & Cemetery, Phoenix.
