= Bertha Lund Glaeser =

American physician (1862–1939)

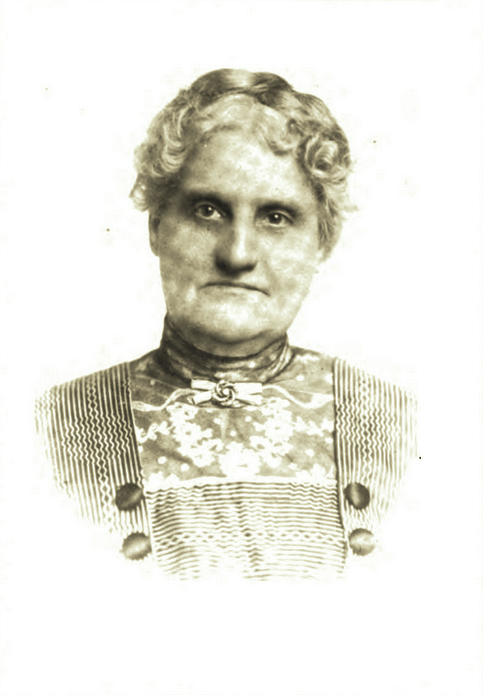
- Born: Bertha Lund; September 28, 1862; Cincinnati, Ohio, U.S.
- Died: May 5, 1939 (aged 76); Cincinnati
- Education: Woman's Medical College of Pennsylvania; Woman's Medical College of Cincinnati
- Medical career
- Field: women's health; pediatrics
- Institutions: Woman's Medical College of Cincinnati

Bertha Lund Glaeser (née, Lund; September 28, 1862 – May 5, 1939) was an American physician. She served as Professor of Pediatrics at the Woman's Medical College of Cincinnati.

== Early life and education ==
Bertha Lund was born in Cincinnati, Ohio, September 28, 1862. Her father was Charles A. Lund, a native of Stockholm, Sweden. He acquired his education at Lund University, Lund, Sweden, and devoted his life to being an artist. Bertha's mother was Anna Orfgen, a native of Alsace–Lorraine, whose father was a Russian officer, while her mother was of French birth. Glaeser was the second in a family of six children. Her mother died when she was a very young child and after her father's second marriage, her home life became unpleasant and she was required to care for herself despite being young.

She began her studies at the Cincinnati Public Schools.

At the age of sixteen, she married Andrew Glaeser. He was a Mason and a member of the Odd Fellows, Knights of Pythias and Workmen lodges, and other societies. When Bertha was 21, she was widowed with three young stepchildren - Edward, Nellie, and August. Her child died very young. Glaeser reared and educated her stepchildren, giving them every advantage that she could secure for them.

While caring for the children, Glaeser took up the study of medicine under Dr. Joseph Roberts Clauser. She was interested in the work to the extent of continuing her studies at the Woman's Medical College of Pennsylvania in Philadelphia, where she remained through three terms and for a year and a half was connected with its clinic. Later, she spent one year as a student at the Cincinnati School of Medicine and Surgery in the "woman's section".

== Career ==
At the Cincinnati School of Medicine and Surgery, she lectured on diseases of children and also had charge of the clinic. The department was later organized into the Woman's Medical College of Cincinnati (later known as the Laura Memorial College). In her practice, Glaeser made steady and notable progress in a large private practice, specializing in diseases of women and children. In addition, she was a medical examiner for the Massachusetts Mutual Life Insurance Company and also the Masonic Widows and Orphans Relief of Toledo, Ohio.

In 1895, Glaeser went to Europe and studied in Vienna, Berlin, Dresden, and London. Upon her return to the U.S., she resumed her practice in Cincinnati, devoting her attention exclusively to diseases of women and children, an area in which she was successful. She was a member of the Cincinnati Academy of Medicine, Ohio State Medical Society, and the American Medical Association.

Aside from professional connections, Glaeser was a member of the Golden Rod Chapter of the Order of the Eastern Star, of which she was a past worthy matron. She also belonged to the Mistletoe Lodge of the International Association of Rebekah Assemblies and held its highest office. Glaeser belonged to St. Paul Episcopal church. She was not an advocate of woman suffrage, believing that she always had her rights without recourse to the ballot.

== Death and legacy ==
Bertha Lund Glaeser died at Good Samaritan Hospital, Cincinnati, on May 5, 1939.

The Bertha Lund Glaeser Fund was established by bequest in 1939 to provide tuition for women students in the College of Medicine at the University of Cincinnati.
