= Women of the Moose =

Women's organization in the United States

The Women of the Moose are the female auxiliary of the Loyal Order of Moose. Like the rest of the Order, membership originally operated by racial discrimination and was historically open to only white women; it has since been integrated.

The WOTM works four degrees. The first is the Co-Worker and is considered necessary to be considered a full member. The other three are Academy of Friendship, College of Regents, and Star Recorder, and are based on merit. On formal occasions members wear Geneva gowns, reminiscent of those worn at college graduations and church choirs. Officers wear different colored stoles.

The Women of the Moose are headquartered in Mooseheart, Illinois.

== History ==
The WOTM originated as the Women of Mooseheart Legion in 1913. In the early years the group had little structure above the Chapter level. In 1926, Katherine Smith, the Director of Public Employment in the Department of Labor under James J. Davis, was appointed the first "Grand Chancellor" of the Women of the Moose. Under her direction the WOM grew to 250,000 members by the time of her retirement in 1964.

Local units are called "Chapters." Officials on the state level are given "Grand" designations and on the national level "Supreme" designations, ergo, "Supreme Secretary," "Grand Secretary" etc. In 1979, there were 1,824 Chapters. Currently there are approximately 1,600 chapters in all 50 states and four Canadian provinces.

In 1979, there were 377,282 members. Today, there are more than 400,000.
