= Ye Antient Order of Noble Corks =

Informal degree in Freemasonry

Ye Antient Order of Noble Corks (American usage) or Ancient & Honourable Societas Korcorum Magnae Britanniae (Noble Order of Corks) (English usage), universally known, informally, as The Cork, is an informal degree allied to Freemasonry. It is described as a "fun" degree, with charitable fund raising as a principal aim.

== Origins ==
Distinctly nautical in form, its membership criteria vary between branches of the order. Whilst some branches (such as the Grand Fleet) will admit all Master Masons in good standing, others restrict membership to Master Masons who are either a companion in the Holy Royal Arch or a Warden, Master or Past Master of a craft Lodge. The title 'Cork' or 'Corks' is derived from the cork stopper of a wine bottle, which is the organisation's principal emblem. In different countries this emblem appears variously as a miniature cork set in a silver clasp (for carrying), or a small cork suspended from a light blue ribbon (to be worn like a medal), or the image of a cork with a corkscrew inserted at an angle.

The origins of the degree ceremony are unknown; the ritual is satirical and based around the era of Noah and the great flood. The earliest surviving records of the degree are held by the Grand Lodge of Mark Master Masons of England, but this cannot be assumed to demonstrate that the degree originated from that organisation.

== Charity ==
All fees received by the Lodge must be paid, in full, to the treasurer of a charity, preferably a children's charity with no deduction being made for administrative expenses. Meetings are characterised by regular humorous 'fines', in which a single member, or (more commonly) everybody present, is required to pay a fine by throwing a coin into a bucket or other receptacle. All fines are also applied to charitable purposes, usually a children's charity.

== The pocket cork ==
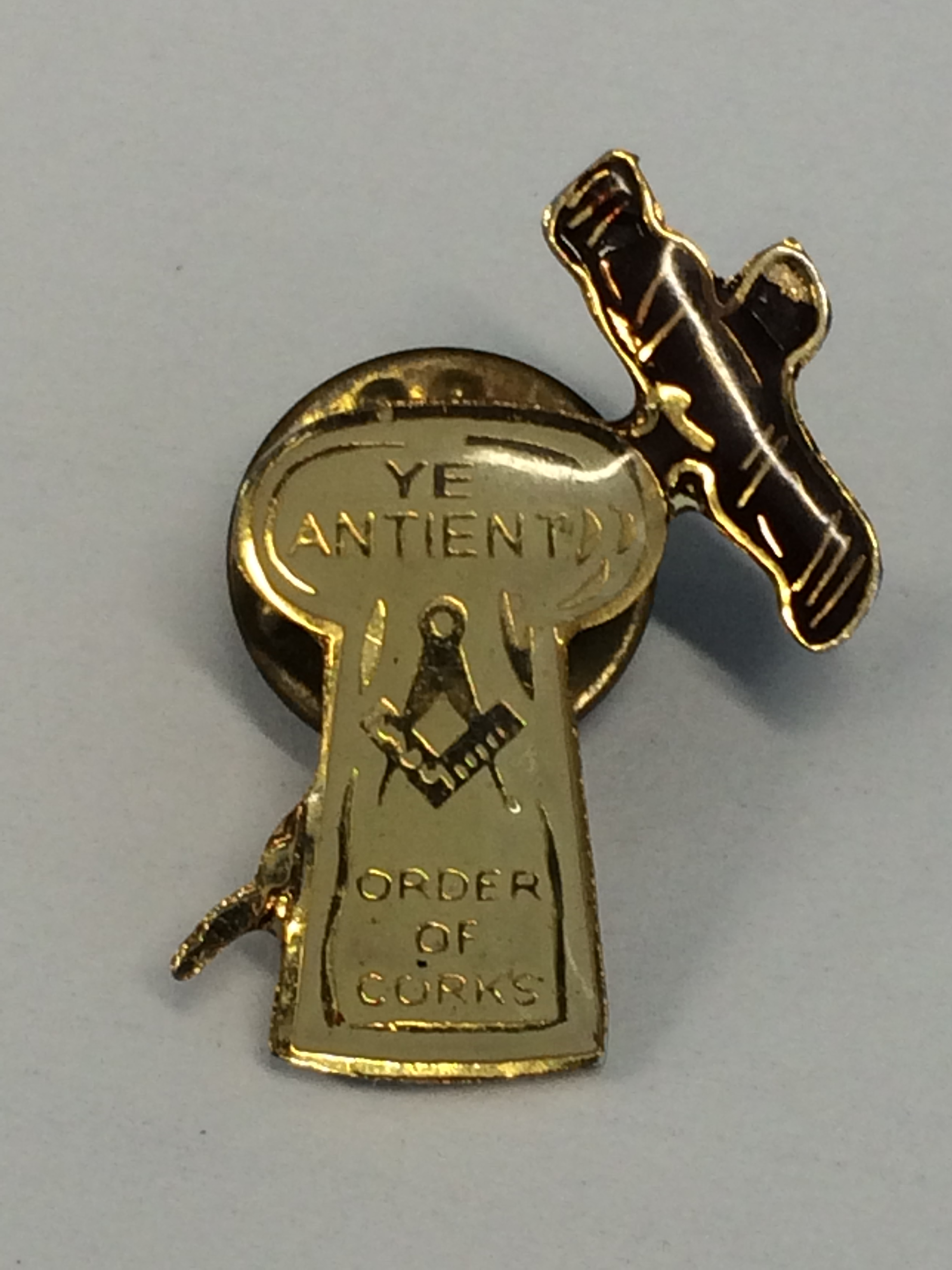
Cork lodge lapel pin currently being used in Australia by Endeavour Cork Lodge No. 1

Members are required to carry a pocket cork at all times, and to be able to produce it on demand. According to ritual currently used in Scotland by the Rattray Cork Court (Obtained from Iama Cork Court from an unknown source) the pocket cork is traditionally a piece of cork within a silver ring, the hole five sixths in diameter and one eighth in thickness. However, many variations of this design are in use, with the common feature being a piece of cork held within another material which is usually metallic in nature. Any member being unable to produce the jewel is fined, the fine being given to the Purser at the next meeting for contribution to charity. In some traditions it is a piece of cork in a metal ring; in others it is a small cork set in a silver clasp (which may be worn as, for example, a watch fob); in still others it is a flat piece of cork which may be easily carried in a wallet.

== Structure and Degree of the Cork ==
Membership is not onerous—the only costs on top of membership being dining fees, drinks, etc. The idea and aim being to raise money for children's charities, and with Corkies (or Corkers ) having fun in so doing. In Boards (lodges) under the English Great Board of Corks there are no subscriptions or joining fees. Cork lodges are sometimes known as Cork "Courts" for example "Iama Cork Court" and "Rattray Cork Court."

Candidates can be proposed and initiated on the same night. Compared with masonic meetings, dress is informal - as meetings tend to be boisterous affairs, in good spirits. The ritual and initiation part takes up the first part of the evening, followed by festivities that are "closer to a Scottish Harmony than an English Festive Board". Hats are worn during the meeting, with headgear style being of personal choice - the sillier, the better.

The presiding officer is known as the Admiral. Similarly, the head of a national Great Board of Corks is known as the Great Admiral. All board or lodge officers have naval titles, roughly equating to the officers in a Craft Lodge, with jewels of office (when used) often being borne on strings of corks. Titles vary between countries and traditions, but the following is an example of Cork officers:

- Rather Worshipful Admiral (also known as High Priest Admiral)
- Uncommonly Worshipful Mate (also known as Deacon)
- Highly Worshipful Purser (also known as Almoner)
- Hardly Worshipful Lookout (also known as Inner guard)
- Nearly Rather Worshipful Vice Admiral
- Undoubtedly Ship's Writer
- Little Less Worshipful Doctor (also known as Fizz(ychian))
- Barely Worshipful Cook (also known as Stew(ard))
- Mainly Worshipful Bosun (also known as Booz Un Tight)
- Particularly Worthy Screw (also known as Tiler)
- Almost Worthy Carpenter
- Particularly Worthy Shipmate
- Bartender (Rattray Cork Court specific)
- Fruit Loaf (Rattray Cork Court specific)

Scotland: the Cork tradition is particularly strong in Scotland, no overseeing body exists at present.

United States of America: whilst the Cork is usually associated with Mark Masonry, in the United States it forms an informal and optional part of the formal system of the Allied Masonic Degrees.

England and Wales: in England the Grand Lodge of Mark Master Masons holds the oldest known English Cork records, manuscripts, and regalia. Before the Second World War there are various references to English Mark Lodges working the Cork degree at dinner after their formal Mark meeting. A body known as the 'Great Board of Corks', and consisting of senior Grand Officers of the Mark Grand Lodge, controlled the Cork degree for many years, but fell into abeyance. By 2002 it had been revived, with at least one surviving member of the original Great Board. Additionally, at least one 'Board of Corks' under the authority of the Great Board, has survived the passage of time. However, the English situation is now complicated in that some old Cork lodges have histories originating without reference to the Great Board, and may properly be considered independent of that body. In general, English bodies styling themselves a 'Lodge of Corks' are independent, and derived from Scottish tradition, whilst English bodies styling themselves a 'Board of Corks' are under the jurisdiction of the Great Board of Corks. In 2012 several independent Cork Lodges, not associated with the Great Board of Corks, formed themselves into the Grand Fleet of Cork Lodges. The fleet includes UK and mainland European Cork Lodges.

Australia: while relatively new in Australia, it follows the tradition of the Cork Order in Scotland and England. However, its membership is open to all Master Masons in good standing. Currently there is only one authorised Cork Lodge in Australia operating in the city of Brisbane (Queensland). This lodge is Endeavour Cork Lodge No.1 and was established in 2011.

== Cork Lodges ==
The following are Cork Lodges located in Scotland.

=== Scotland ===
- Iama Cork Court, Aberdeen.
- Rattray Cork Court, Peterhead (Dormant for many years and re-established in 2018 by local Peterhead Freemasons who were initiated to the Iama Cork Court in Aberdeen)
- Maeshowe Antient & Most Noble Cork Lodge, Kirkwall, Orkney
- Angus & Mearns Cork Lodge
- Eastmuir Cork Lodge & Chapter, Glasgow
- Lodge Oak No.877, Kelty, Fife
- Dunearn Cork Lodge, Burntisland, Fife
- St Andrews Antient Cork Lodge, Glasgow
- Stirling Rock Royal Arch Cork Lodge, Chapter No 2

=== England ===
==== Boards authorised by the Great Board of Corks ====
- The Alt Board of Corks, No 1, Ormskirk
- The Isis Board of Corks, No 2, Oxford
- The Wenning Board of Corks, No 3, Morecambe
- The Fleet Board of Corks, No 4, London
- The Dee Board of Corks, No 5, Chester
- The Serpentine Board of Corks, No 6, London
- The Wyre Board of Corks, No 7, Blackpool
- The Croal Board of Corks, No 8, Bolton
- The Estuary Board of Corks, No 9, Shenfield

==== Lodges associated with the Grand Fleet of Independent Cork Lodges ====
- Radlett Cork Lodge, Hertfordshire
- Itchen Cork Lodge, Hampshire
- Nelson Cork Lodge, Beaconsfield, Bucks website
- Wantsum Cork Lodge, Broadstairs, Kent website
- Floating Corks of Devonshire, Devon
- Wildfire Cork Lodge, Kent website
- Bristol Citte, Bristol
- Milton Keynes Cork, Bucks
- Brayford Cork, Lincs
- Pallant Cork Lodge, Chichester, West Sussex website
- Little Mesters Corks, Sheffield website

=== Belgium ===
- Lodge Belgian, Brussels, Belgium

=== Italy ===
- Cork Lodge Italia 2004, Arezzo, Italy

=== Australia (authorised by the Grand Council of Noble Corks of Australia) ===
- Endeavour Cork Lodge, No 1, Brisbane

== See also ==
- Masonic appendant bodies
