= Ancient Mystic Order of Samaritans =

Fraternal appendant body to the Odd Fellows

- Nickname: AMOS
- Founded: 1924; 102 years ago (1876)
- Type: Fraternal appendant body of all Odd Fellows

The Ancient Mystic Order of Samaritans (AMOS) is an unofficial appendant body of all Odd Fellows. It is recognized as the "playground for Odd Fellowship", (comparable to The "Shriners" within Freemasonry) and is known for engaging in public and private hijinks and spectacle, all in the name of good, clean fun. AMOS is open to male Odd Fellows in good standing over the age of 18 but has a close relationship with Ladies of the Orient ("LOTO"), which is only open to women. The two organizations typically meet at the same time and share in social events with each other. Like many other primarily social appendant bodies to fraternal organizations, the rituals and initiations of AMOS have a Middle-Eastern theme and the official regalia is a fez.

The Order has existed in a variety of forms and under multiple names. It was first founded in 1876 as the Oriental Order of Humility (OOH). In 1901, the Supreme Orient governing body was formed, now known as Supreme Sanctorum and the name of the organization changed to the Oriental Order of Humility and Perfection (OOH&P) due to the addition of a second degree. Over the next decade, the OOH&P gradually merged with several other similar Odd Fellows appendant bodies formed in the late 19th and early 20th centuries: the Imperial Order of Muscovites, the Pilgrim Knights of Oriental Splendor, the Veiled Prophets of Baghdad, and the Ancient Mystic Order of Cabirians. The name of the combined body was first chosen to be the United Order of Splendor and Perfection and later changed to the present name of Ancient Mystic Order of Samaritans as efforts to bring more units from Odd Fellows appendant bodies into one entity continued. During the evolution of the Order and its constituent bodies, names, titles and regalia have also changed numerous times. Today the Order exists in The United States, Canada, and the Philippines. Historically Sanctorums were also present in Cuba and the Panama Canal Zone.

== Organization and activities ==
=== Ceremonies ===
There are two degrees conferred by AMOS. The first or "Humility Degree" is conferred by subordinate sanctorums. In this degree, reference is made to the story of Xerxes, a haughty Persian king who was taught the lesson of Humility by one of his subjects. Those who have received this degree are referred to as "Samaritans." After receiving the Humility Degree, a Samaritan is eligible to receive the second or "Perfection Degree" which is typically conferred at a Divisional or Supreme Convention. Those who have received this degree are referred to as "Sheiks."

=== Structure ===
Local subordinate bodies are referred to as Sanctorums. Each Sanctorum selects its own name which is typically of an Eastern or fanciful nature and is assigned a number. Sanctorums are further grouped into Districts and Divisions which are ultimately under the jurisdiction of the Supreme Sanctorum. The officers of a subordinate sanctorum are:

Office	Elected/Appointed	Duty
Grand Monarch	Elected	Presides over meetings.
Vice Grand Monarch	Elected	Assists the Grand Monarch and fills in for him in his absence.
Grand Counsellor	Elected	Presides in the absence of the Grand Monarch or Vice Grand Monarch.
Registrar	Elected	Acts as the recording and corresponding secretary.
Collector	Elected	Acts as the financial secretary.
Banker	Elected	Acts as the treasurer.
Venerable Friar	Elected	Recites opening and closing prayers and counsels members. This position is occupied by the immediate past Grand Monarch.
Grand High Executioner	Appointed	Protects the life of the Grand Monarch.
Grand Chief Guide	Appointed	Collects fines and takes charge of the candidates during degrees.
Grand Monitor	Appointed	Assists in sanctorum business and in degree work.
Grand Stentoros	Appointed	Guards the inner door.
Grand Herald	Appointed	Guards the outer door.

After completing a term as Grand Monarch of his Sanctorum, a Sheik or Samaritan is referred to as a Past Grand Monarch and is eligible to hold higher office, such as District Deputy Supreme Monarchos. Supreme elected offices include the Supreme Monarchos, Supreme Khalifah, Supreme Counsellor, Supreme Prince, Supreme Secretary and Supreme Treasurer. The appointed offices include Supreme Vizier, Supreme Muezzin, Supreme Stentoros, and Supreme Ali Baba among others. Similar offices exist on a Divisional level as well.

=== Events ===
AMOS puts on a wide variety of social and fraternal events in public and in private including conventional ones such as banquets and parties as well as more unusual ones, such as staging a mock trial for a member or performing as a kazoo band. One sanctorum was known to actually have its own live goat. Like the Odd Fellows lodges from whom AMOS draws its membership, sanctorums and members are involved with charitable works such as visiting and providing financial assistance to the sick or aged. Charitable works involving cognitive disabilities are a particular focus of charitable work performed by AMOS.

== Regalia ==
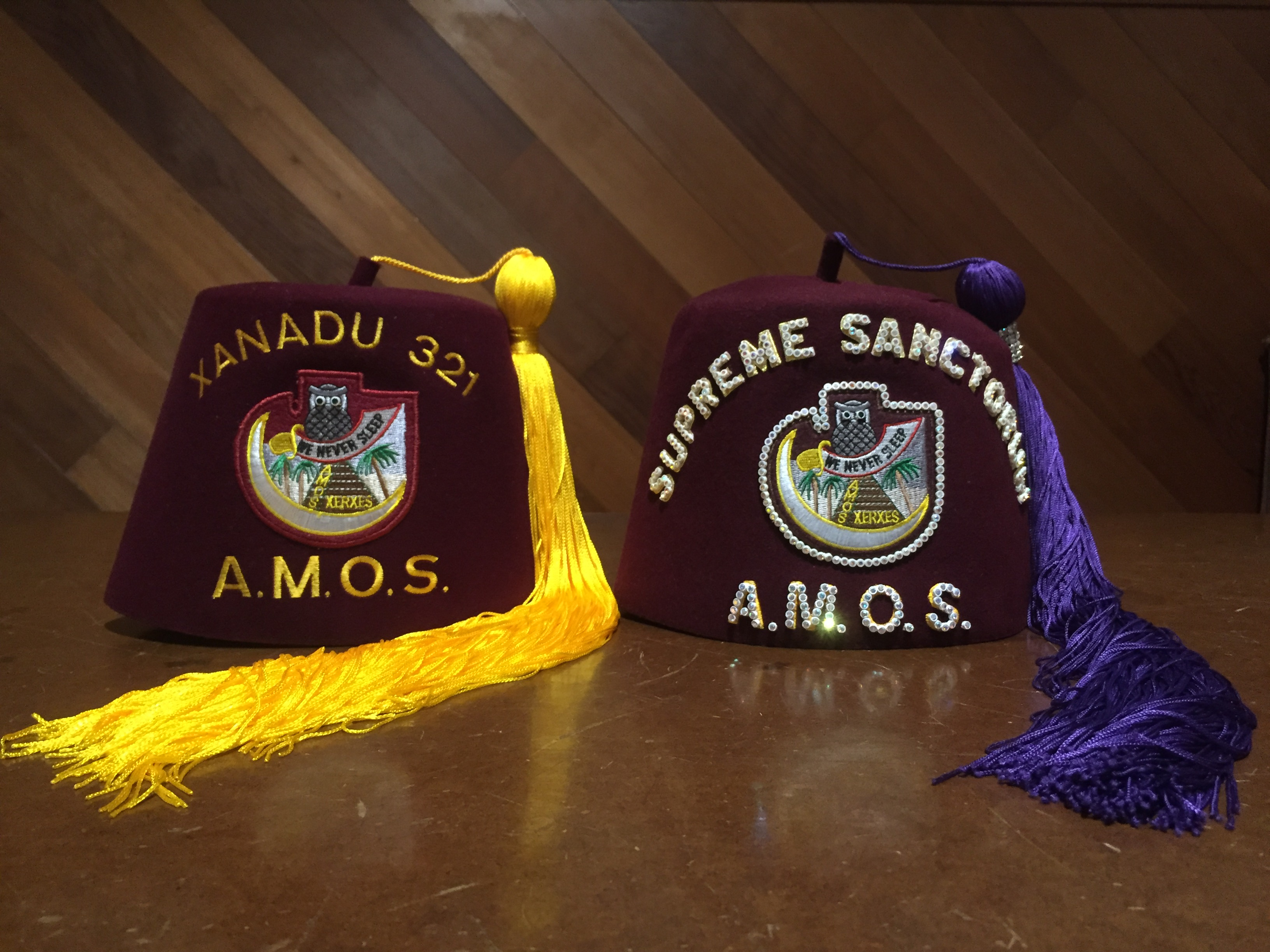
Basic member fez and Supreme officer fez from the Ancient Mystic Order of Samaritans.

The regalia of AMOS is a fez with the emblem of the group in the center, a pyramid with the names "Xerxes" and "AMOS" inscribed on it, surrounded by palm trees. Below the pyramid is a crescent moon and above it is an owl perched on a scimitar inscribed with "We Never Sleep," the motto of the Order. Below the logo are the letters "A.M.O.S." and above it is the name of the wearer's sanctorum, Division, or "Supreme Sanctorum," depending on the rank of the member. AMOS possesses a more complex series of fez and tassel colors than most fez-wearing fraternal organizations with the following different fez and tassel color combinations used:

Rank	Fez Color	Tassel Color
Samaritan	Red	Yellow
Sheik	Red	Red
Past Grand Monarch (Samaritan)	Red	Yellow & Blue
Past Grand Monarch (Sheik)	Red	Red & Blue
District Deputy Supreme Monarchos	Red	Purple
Past District Deputy Supreme Monarchos (Samaritan)	Red	Yellow, White & Blue
Past District Deputy Supreme Monarchos (Sheik)	Red	Red, White & Blue
Elected Divisional Officer	Blue	Red
Divisional Supreme Monarchos	Blue	Purple
Past Divisional Supreme Monarchos	Blue	White
Elected Supreme Officer	Red	Purple
Supreme Monarchos	Purple	Purple
Past Supreme Monarchos	Purple	White

== History ==
=== The Oriental Order of Humility ===
The first predecessor from which modern day AMOS derives is the Oriental Order of Humility (OOH) which was purportedly founded by Dr. E. A. Baxter in 1876 in NY and 1879 in Canada. The initial founding did not last and the Order had to be re-instituted in 1898. There is some confusion regarding whether the OOH was, in fact, an Odd Fellows appendant body, if it served as an appendant body for the Knights of Pythias, if it was open to men from multiple orders, or if there were multiple orders operating under the name Oriental Order of Humility. At least some instances of the OOH were known to relate to Xerxes as did later incarnations. According to one source, the OOH was initially known as the Grand Oriental Order of Humility. There is also some variation in known officer titles with the presiding officer alternatively referred to as the Worthy Grand Chief or as the Most Potent Grand Seignor and the other officers known as Noble Vizier, Reverend Friar, Reverend Monitor, Chief Herald, and Seneschal; these early officer names clearly bear some relation to those used today. The subordinate bodies were sometimes referred to as Huts. The ritual was far less developed than that used in later incarnations, apparently consisting of merely "a solitary charge, written on a sheet of foolscap paper, crude in form, yet with a 'striking' idea, which gave it the 'zip' that made it instantly popular with all those who were 'elevated' to its charmed circle." This ritual was later expanded into a full-blown ritual by James Smith of London, Ontario and John A. MacDonald, who later went on to the first Supreme Monarchos of the Supreme Orient when it was founded in 1901. The early custom was to confer the degree at the annual sessions of grand bodies wherever convenient.

=== The Oriental Order of Humility and Perfection ===
OOH is reported to have been reorganized as the Oriental Order of Humility and Perfection (OOH&P) in 1901 in Guelph, ON, but it is not entirely clear whether this reorganization is the same organization or a new one inspired by the original. This also coincides with the instituting of Supreme Orient on August 13, 1901, the predecessor to Supreme Sanctorum, as well as the creation of the Perfection Degree. Both the Perfection Degree and the rituals of the Supreme Orient were written by Abner Fraser of Hamilton, ON, the first Supreme Clericus of The Supreme Orient, a job which later came to be titled Supreme Secretary in AMOS. The Supreme Orient was incorporated in New York on February 5, 1919. The OOH&P had even more in common with today's incarnation than did the OOH, including the familiar owl and scimitar logo and very similar set of officers, with the principal difference being today's Grand Monarch was formerly referred to as a Grand High Hystytee and the Vice Grand Monarch as Vice Grand Hystytee. The local bodies of OOH&P were referred to as Sanctorums. The two ranks of members were Tribesmen who had taken the Degree of Humility and Sheiks who had further taken the Degree of Perfection.

=== The Imperial Order of Muscovites ===
The Imperial Order of Muscovites (IOM) was established in 1894 in Cincinnati, OH and was only open to Odd Fellows. Unlike most other social side bodies of fraternal orders, the IOM opted for a Russian theme instead of the standard Middle-Eastern, styling local bodies Kremlins and referring to the chief officer as the Czar. As with most other similar groups, however, the Muscovites did adopt a fez as their official regalia, albeit a non-standard one with a band of fur along the brim they referred to as a busby. The IOM additionally spawned an affiliated appendant body for women who were Rebekahs known as the Lady Muscovites in June 1925. It was active in a variety of states throughout the Midwest and Western United States. In Oregon and Washington, the Kremlins created their own separate Imperial Kremlin under the name Improved Order of Muscovites and adopted alternative ritual work and regalia.

=== The Pilgrim Knights of Oriental Splendor ===
The Pilgrim Knights of Oriental Splendor (PKOS) began in Atlanta, GA with the formation of Pharaoh Palace No. 1 in Fall of 1915. It admitted only men who were third degree Odd Fellows and spread throughout the states of the Southeast United States, including Georgia, Alabama, and Tennessee. The PKOS were known to put on street parades, including stunts, and conferred a degree known as the Pilgrim Knight degree. Their governing body was known as the Supreme Palace. The regalia for Pilgrim Knights was a purple fez with a yellow tassel, having a metallic sphinx head on a star, covering a downward pointing crescent.

=== The Ancient Mystic Order of Cabiri ===
The Ancient Mystic Order of Cabiri (AMOC) was founded as a playground order for the Odd Fellows around 1920, beginning with Oakland Council No. 1 in Oakland, CA. The bodies of the Order were named after the cities they met in, which included San Francisco, Sacramento, and Marysville in addition to Oakland. The groups held social dances in addition to ceremonials and stated meetings and were also known to organize the Cabiri Band which held public performances.

=== The Veiled Prophets of Baghdad ===
The Veiled Prophets of Baghdad (VPB) was formed with the establishment of Azar Imperial Clan No. 1 in St. Joseph, MO followed by Zoar Clan No. 2 in Kansas City, KS in 1921. It was a purely social order, only accepting Odd Fellows as members and having a fez for its regalia. The Clan officers included a First Caliph, Desert Guide, High Priest, Recording Scribe, Master of the Exchequer, and Master of the Guard. There was additionally an associated women's group known as Princess of Baghdad, having as officers a Prophetess, High Princess, Desert Guide, Recording Scribe, Financial Scribe, and High Priestess. The women's Clans wore fezzes and capes.

=== The United Order of Splendor and Perfection ===
After the subject had been discussed for several years, representatives of all the participating orders gathered at the Oriental Order of Humility and Perfection's annual Supreme session in August 1924 to vote on consolidation and select a new name. The plans to merge the Odd Fellows fez-wearing appendant bodies were completed on August 11, 1924, with the establishment of the United Order of Splendor and Perfection. A new ritual was adopted based on the literature and customs of the Aztecs. The symbol created for the newly merged group was a blazing volcano with a red "X" on the face of a blue field. The newly amalgamated order included approximately 40,000 men from the Oriental Order of Humility and Perfection in the East and the North, 7,000 men from the Imperial Order of Muscovites in the Mid-West, 4,000 men from the Pilgrim Knights of Oriental Splendor in the Southeast, and 500 men from the Ancient Mystic Order of Cabiri in California for an estimated total of 52,000 in the new body. The Improved Order of Muscovites from the Pacific Northwest opted not to participate in the merger at this time.

Following much internal strife, the group was re-organized in 1925 as the Ancient Mystic Order of Samaritans with the new addition of the Improved Order of Muscovites as well as the Veiled Prophets of Baghdad.

== See also ==
- Ladies of the Orient
- Imperial Order of Muscovites
