= Ancient Egyptian Arabic Order of the Nobles of the Mystic Shrine =

Fraternal organization of African Americans and other Black people

Prince Hall Shriners
- Ancient Egyptian Arabic Order of the Nobles of the Mystic Shrine

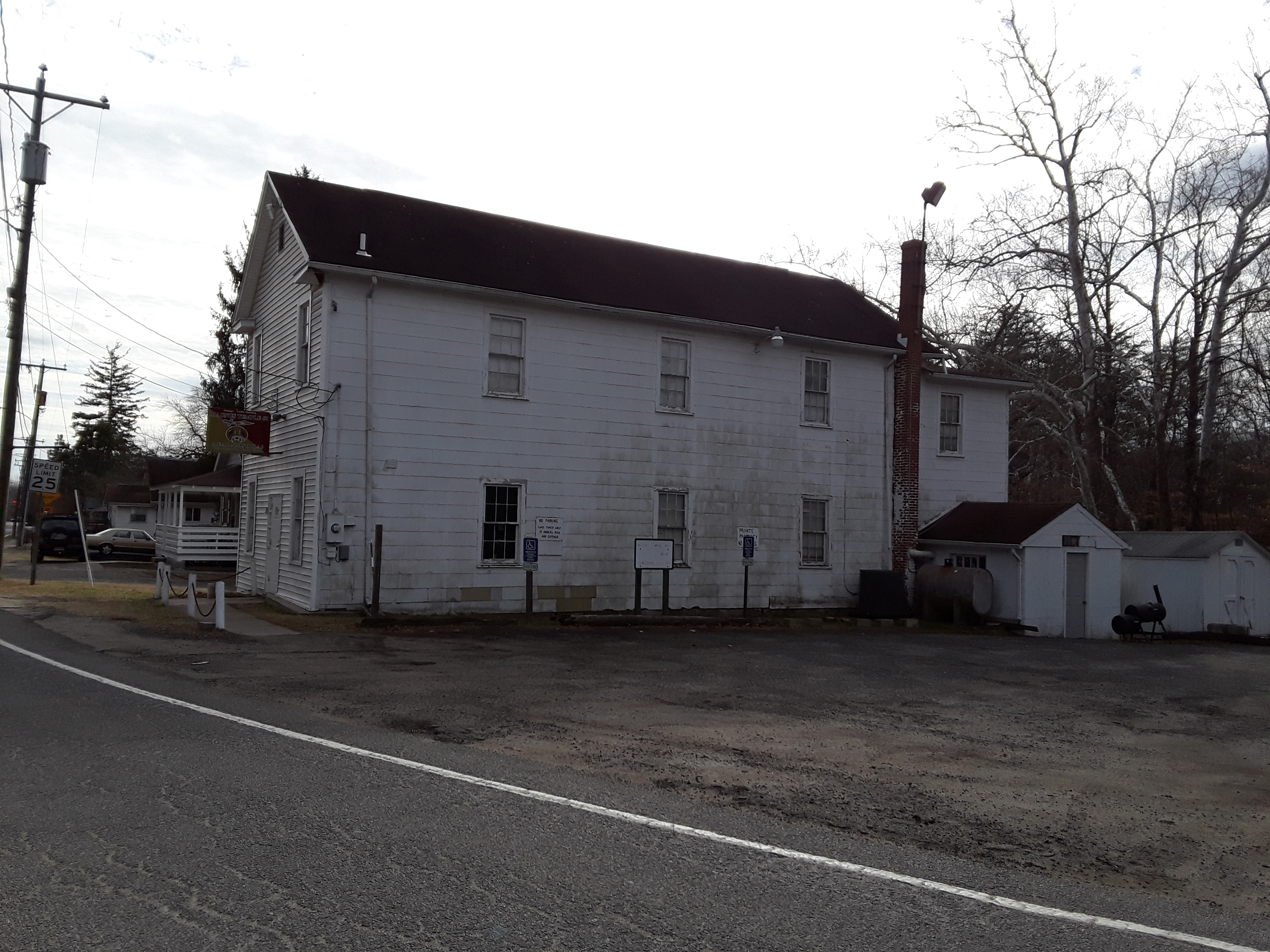
- Magnus Temple in Accotink, Virginia
- Abbreviation: AEAONMS
- Formation: 1893; 133 years ago
- Founder: John George Jones
- Founded at: World's Columbian Exposition in Chicago, Illinois
- Type: African-American Freemasonry Shriners
- Headquarters: 2239 Democrat Road, Memphis, Tennessee 38132
- Coordinates: 35.0682919°N 89.9890344°W,
- Origins: Prince Hall Freemasonry and Ancient Arabic Order of the Nobles of the Mystic Shrine
- Members: 25,000
- Imperial Potentate: Thomas R. Hughes, Sr.
- Imperial High Priest & Prophet: Terrell A. Gray Sr., Ph.D.
- Imperial Treasurer: Alan H. Thornton
- Publication: The Pyramid
- Subsidiaries: Imperial Court
- Website: aeaonms.org

The Ancient Egyptian Arabic Order of the Nobles of the Mystic Shrine of North and South America and its Jurisdictions (A.E.A.O.N.M.S.), commonly called the Prince Hall Shriners, is a masonic organization for African Americans. It is based on the Shriners which historically prohibited Black men from joining. The Imperial Court, formerly the Daughters of Isis, is its sister organization.

== Early History ==
The order was established at the World's Columbian Exposition and incorporated under the laws of Illinois in 1893. That incorporation was eventually abandoned and in 1901 the order was incorporated as a fraternal and charitable association under the Act of Congress passed May 5, 1870. The organization was founded by John George Jones who was thereafter elected as the head or the Most Imperial Grand Potentate. The organization soon established branches nationally including ones in El Paso, Dallas, and Houston.

Fraternal groups for African Americans that mirrored white fraternal organizations were often sued by these white organizations. The Ancient Arabic Order of the Nobles of the Mystic Shrine (Shriners) accused the A.E.A.O.N.M.S of infringing on their name and practices and sued them. There was a suspension of a lodge in 1946 was followed by a lawsuit.

== The Organization Today ==
The group has held a convention in Tampa, Florida four times and a fifth convention is planned for 2026. The 2023 convention included a parade and community outreach. The City of Tampa anticipated 12,000 attendees and family members visiting for the 2023 event. Oliver Washington Jr. was documented as 38th Imperial Potentate in 2009. The Pyramid is its official publication.

Howard University interviewed a few of its members. The Denver Public Library has records for the Syrian Temple No. 49 in Denver.

Author and historian of masonry Joseph A. Walkes wrote Black Square & Compass: 200 Years of Prince Hall Freemasonry published in 1989 and History of the Shrine: Ancient Egyptian Arabic Order Nobles of the Mystic Shrine, Inc. (Prince Hall Affiliated) : a Pillar of Black Society, 1893-1993 published in 1993.

== Locations ==
The organization has numerous Temples and Courts in the "Desert of Florida."

Other temples include:

- Alcazar Temple #179, Sacramento, California
- Hella Temple #105, Nashville, Tennessee
- Jeddah Temple #160, Orangeburg, South Carolina
- Obelisk Temple #187, Okinawa, Japan
- Rahman Temple #77, Pine Bluff, Arkansas
- Magnus Temple #3, Accotink, Virginia
- Mut'im Temple #240 Fredericksburg, Virginia
- Wasi Temple #272, Canton, Mississippi

== See also ==
- Prince Hall
- Prince Hall Freemasonry
- Prince Hall Order of the Eastern Star
- Knights of Pythias of North America, South America, Europe, Asia, Africa and Australia
