= International Association of Rebekah Assemblies =

International sororal service organization

- Founded: September 20, 1851; 175 years ago Baltimore, Maryland, US
- Type: Sororal service organization
- Affiliation: Independent Order of Odd Fellows
- Status: Active
- Scope: International
- Nickname: Daughters of Rebekah
- Headquarters: 422 North Trade Street; Winston-Salem, North Carolina 27101; United States
- Website: www.ioof.org

The Daughters of Rebekah, also known as the Rebekahs and the International Association of Rebekah Assemblies, is an international service-oriented organization and a branch of the Independent Order of Odd Fellows. As a branch of the Independent Order of Odd Fellows, the Rebekahs began as an all-white organization, typical at the time, that purported to promote reciprocity and charity, and drew inspiration from Judeo-Christian ethics.

The Independent Order of Odd Fellows originally limited membership to white men only, as was typical at the time; the Rebekahs began as the female auxiliary of the IOOF. Initially, only relatives such as wives or daughters of IOOF members were admitted as members.

Currently, both the IOOF and the Rebekahs admit both female and male members. Women today need not be related to an Odd Fellow to be a member of the Rebekahs. As long as she meets the moral, ethical, and age requirements for admission, any woman may join. In most jurisdictions, women aged 16 or 18 years old and above can join a Rebekah Lodge.

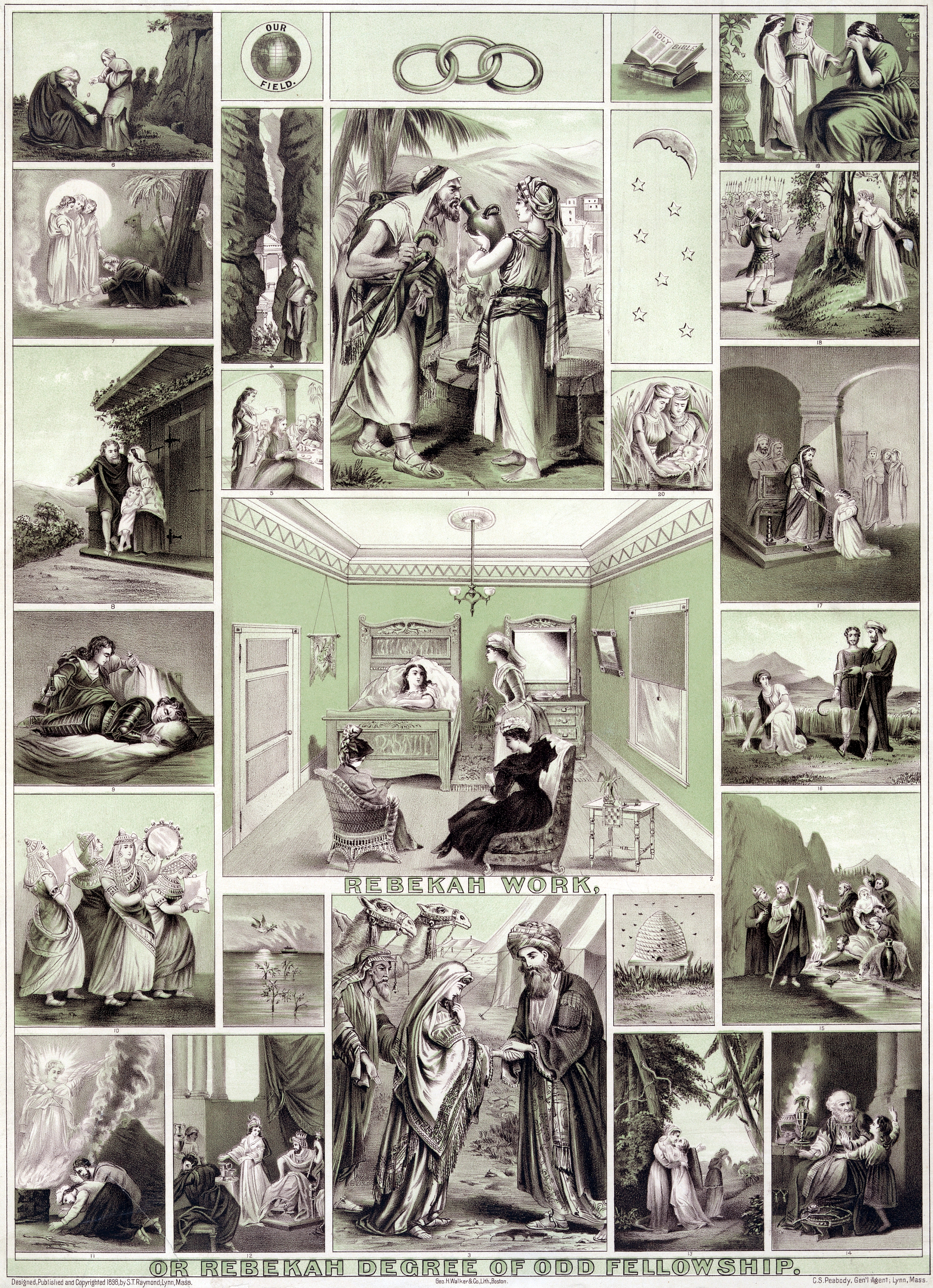
An 1898 print depicting various themes related to the work of the Rebekah Lodges.

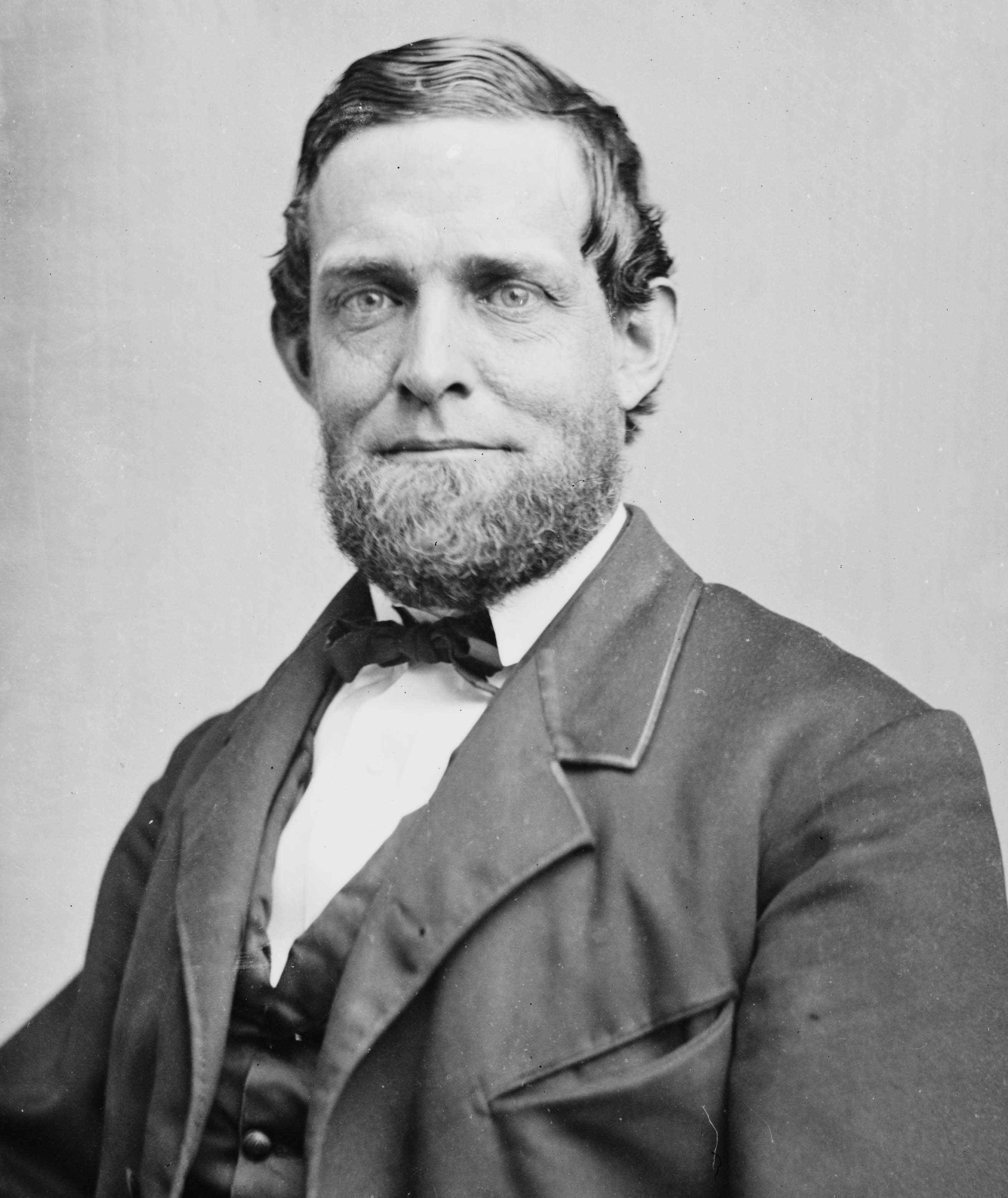
Schuyler Colfax, U.S. Vice-President from March 4, 1869 – March 4, 1873.

== Philosophy and purpose ==
The general duties of the members of this unit are: "To live peaceably, do good unto all as we have opportunity, and especially to obey the Golden Rule: 'Whatsoever ye would that others should do unto you, do ye even so unto them.'"

== History ==
In 1850, Schuyler Colfax was asked to write a Degree for women. The Rebekah Lodges were founded on September 20, 1851, in Baltimore, Maryland, when, after considerable debate, the Sovereign Grand Lodge of the Independent Order of Odd Fellows voted to adopt the Rebekah Degree, largely due to the efforts of Odd Fellow Schuyler Colfax, U.S. Vice President from 1869 to 1873. The first Rebekah Degrees were honorary awards only, conferred on wives and daughters of Odd Fellows at special Lodge meetings, and recipients were known as "Daughters of Rebekah." The name is taken from the Biblical character of Rebekah.

The early Daughters of Rebekah had no lodge system of their own, operating informally and locally. On September 25, 1868, the IOOF voted to establish Degree Lodges of the Daughters of Rebekah, mirroring the existing arrangements for their male counterparts. The Daughters were given the right to elect their officers, charge initiation fees, collect dues, and undertake charitable and benevolent activities. The name was changed to "Degree of Rebekah" in 1874.

== Teachings and symbolism ==
The Rebekah Degree was designed especially for women, and its ceremony and lectures are based upon the characters of notable women in Biblical history. It is named for that woman of early Hebrew history whose kindness and hospitality to a humble and unknown stranger was thought the best portrayal of the nobility and character of women. There are also other notable women of Biblical history whose characters and virtues form the basis for the Rebekah Degree and lessons of life to be followed by the Rebekahs. They were famous for their loyalty, patriotism, civic and national services, for humanitarianism, and for devotion to God and the cause of righteousness among mankind.

The Rebekah Degree ceremony is illustrated by distinctive symbols employed in the work of the degree, each having a significance and an appropriate application:

- The beehive, a representation of cooperative industry teaching the advantages of united efforts in all the ministries of the order.
- The moon and seven stars represent the never-failing order which pervades the universe of God and all of nature, and suggest to the members the value of system, regularity, and precision in all worthy undertakings
- The dove, a universally recognized emblem of peace, has this significance in the Rebekah Degree. Through the mission of love and charity, of tolerance and forbearance, Rebekahs are to strive to bring happiness to others and to promote “Peace on earth and good will to men.”
- The lily, long regarded as the emblem of purity, is a symbol of the purity of character, of thought, of word, and of action which are aspired to in the hearts and lives of members of the Rebekah Lodge.

== Rebekah Creed ==
"I am a Rebekah. I believe in the Fatherhood of God, the brotherhood of man and the sisterhood of women. I believe in the watch-words of our Order - Friendship, Love, and Truth. Friendship - is like a chain that ties our hearts together. Love - is a gift, the more you give, the more you receive. Truth - is the standard by which we value people. It is the foundation of our Society. I believe that my main concern should be my God, my family and my friends. Then I should reach out to my community and the world. For in God's eyes we are all brothers and sisters. I am a Rebekah!"

== Membership ==
Originally, membership was open to wives and daughters of Odd Fellows who had obtained the Scarlett Degree, as well as Odd Fellows of that degree themselves. In 1894, membership in the United States opened to white women, typical at that time, over 18, as well as wives, widows, and daughters of Odd Fellows, although non-whites were able to join in other countries, such as in Latin America and Australia. The African-American, Grand United Order of Odd Fellows in America, also has a women's branch called the Household of Ruth. On January 1, 1898, there were 297,691 members of the Rebekah Degree. By 1923, it had grown to 1,021,297 members. In 1977 there were 331,844 members of the Rebekahs Assemblies, as well as 34,337 Odd Fellows who belonged to both orders. Odd Fellow and Rebekah lodges allow female and male members, but while both females and males may hold an Odd Fellow office, only females may hold the highest Rebekah offices

== Organization ==
Local units are called "lodges", of which there were 6,700 in 1979 in the United States and Canada.

Lodge officer positions

Office	Elected/ Appointed	Duty
Noble Grand	Elected	Sits as chair for Meetings, Official Representative of lodge to outside persons and organizations, and sees that the lodge program is planned in advance
Vice Grand	Elected	Exercise power to assist Noble Grand in Presiding Meetings. Assume the duties and responsibilities of the NG in times of absence or if necessary.
Past Noble Grand	Elected	Assist Noble Grand and lodge officers in every way possible. May act as NG or VG when legally called thereto
Secretary	Elected	Records minutes at meetings, files necessary paperwork, sends and receives communications.
Financial Secretary	Elected	Notify and collect from members their dues and financial obligations
Treasurer	Elected	Keeps an accurate file of all finances and receipts of the lodge and writes all checks ordered
Warden	Elected	Responsible for the general welfare of the applicant, examines all present before the lodge is opened, gives charge of office during initiations, is in charge of regalia and lodge room property, and will place regalia in the lodge room before and remove it on closing
Conductor	Appointed	Receives the candidates when they enter the lodge room, performs all duties assigned in conferring the degrees, and assists the Warden while in the lodge
Chaplain	Appointed	Leads the opening the closing ceremonies and performs all functions assigned during the conferral of degrees
Right Supporter of Noble Grand	Appointed	Supports the NG in keeping order, executes commands, opens and closes the lodge in due form, sees that signs are given correctly, and occupies the chair of NG when vacated temporarily during lodge hours.
Left Supporter of Noble Grand	Appointed	See that members who enter the room are in proper regalia and give the signs correctly and to officiate for the Right Supporter when absent
Right Supporter of Vice Grand	Appointed	Observe that members give the signs correctly, report to the Noble Grand members that do not conduct themselves according to the regulations of the Order.
Left Supporter of Vice Grand	Appointed	Assist the Right Supporter and officiate for that officer when absent
Color Bearer	Appointed	Oversees flags and proper presentation of such
Right Scene supporter	Appointed	Assist at initiations and perform roles specified in the charge book
Left Scene Supporter	Appointed	Assist at initiations and perform roles specified in the charge book
Inner Guardian	Appointed	Guards the inner door
Outer Guardian	Appointed	Guards the outer door
Musician (Optional)	Appointed	Play all required music and accompaniment during meetings and ceremonies.

=== Theta Rho Girls Clubs ===
Theta Rho girls' Clubs are the junior order of the Rebekahs and are open to females ages 8–18, depending on jurisdiction. The clubs functions under the supervision of the Sovereign Grand Lodge of the Independent Order of Odd Fellows, who are superior in organizational authority to both the Rebekahs and the Theta Rhos. Membership was 14,150 in 1969 and 13,577 in 1970.

=== Rebekah Children's Services ===
Rebekah Children's Services is a public benefit corporation founded in 1897 by the California Rebekah Lodge as an orphanage. They now provide foster care placement and support services, parent support, prevention, and early specific needs of the child and family whenever categorical services do not work. Their services include outpatient therapy, education to the community, and behavioral health care services to children and families living in Santa Clara, Monterey, and Santa Cruz counties.

== Religious controversy ==
Secular organizations were not widely accepted at the time when the Rebekahs started. Because the Rebekahs was open to anyone regardless of religious affiliations, it met opposition from the clergy, especially the Roman Catholic church, which opposed the separation of the church and state politics. In 1907 the Apostolic Delegate to the United States, Diomede Falconio, in reply to a query from Novatus Benzing, OFM, of Phoenix, Arizona, determined that the Daughters of Rebekah, as well as the female auxiliaries of other condemned secret societies, fell under the same category of condemnation. However, permission for "passive membership" in female groups affiliated with societies condemned by the Church in 1894 (including the Masons, Odd Fellows, Knights of Pythias and Sons of Temperance) could be granted individually under certain conditions, viz. that the person in question had joined the group in good faith before the condemnation, that leaving the group would cause financial hardship due to the loss of sick benefits and insurance, that if permission was granted dues would only be paid by mail, the parishioner would not attend any lodge meetings, and the society would not have anything to do with the person's funeral.

Since 1975, however, several Catholic priests have become members of the Odd Fellows. One of them was Titian Anthos Miani, who joined Scio Lodge No.102 of the Independent Order of Odd Fellows in Linden, California. As soon as the controversy declined and religious leaders began to accept secular organizations, numerous pastors, priests, bishops and rabbis from different religious sects have become members and some even held leadership positions in the Odd Fellows. Currently, membership represents various religious denominations, including Catholics, Protestants, Muslims, and others.

== Today ==
Rebekah Lodges are still active in the United States even though the Odd Fellows Lodges in the United States and Canada now accept women as full members. In Europe and Latin America, however, the Rebekah Lodges are exclusively for women because the women choose to preserve the heritage while the Odd Fellow Lodges remain for men. In 2012, 77,468 active members were belonging to 1,849 Rebekah Lodges located in the United States, Canada, Cuba, Chile, Hawaii, Mexico, Puerto Rico, Uruguay, Venezuela, and in Europe such as Estonia, Belgium, Czech Republic, Denmark, Finland, Germany, Norway, Netherlands, Spain, Sweden, and Switzerland.

Together with the Independent Order of Odd Fellows, Rebekahs undertake various community and charitable projects which include:

- The Odd Fellows and Rebekahs spend over US$7.5 million in relief projects annually
- The I.O.O.F. Educational Foundation provides substantial loans and grants to students
- SOS Children's Village provides a caring home for orphaned children in 132 countries around the world
- Odd Fellow and Rebekah Homes provide a caring environment for the elderly
- I.O.O.F. Living Legacy Program focuses on planting trees and enhancing the environment
- The Arthritis Foundation
- Visual Research Foundation supports vision care and research through the Wilmer Eye Institute
- Odd Fellows & Rebekahs Pilgrimage for Youth sponsors a group of students for an educational trip
- Annual pilgrimages to the "Tomb of the Unknowns" (Arlington National Cemetery, USA), Canadian War Memorial, Ottawa, ON, and other Tombs of the Unknown Soldier.
- Odd Fellow and Rebekah camps and parks provide recreation for the youth and families

== Notable members ==
- Emma Eliza Bower (1852–1937) physician, club-woman, and newspaper owner, publisher, editor
- Julia Grant, first lady of the U.S. (1869–1877), wife of President Ulysses Grant
- Bertha Lund Glaeser (1862–1939), physician
- Lucy Hayes, first lady of the U.S. (1877–1881), wife of President Rutherford Hayes
- Vernettie O. Ivy, for six years a member of the Arizona House of Representatives
- Clara C. Munson, first woman elected mayor in Oregon during the 19th century
- Jennie Phelps Purvis (d. 1924), writer, suffragist, temperance reformer
- Doreen Patterson Reitsma, Wren in the Royal Canadian Navy
- Amber E. Robinson (1867–1961), educator, postmaster, poet, reporter, and social reformer
- Eleanor Roosevelt, first lady of the United States
- Lucy Hobbs Taylor, first U.S. female dentist
- Margaret Ray Wickens (1843–1918), president of the Kansas State Assembly of Rebekahs
