= Independent Order of Odd Fellows =

American fraternal organization

- Seal of the IOOF Sovereign Grand Lodge.
- Abbreviation: IOOF
- Named after: Odd Fellows
- Formation: April 26, 1819; 207 years ago
- Founder: Thomas Wildey
- Founded at: Washington Lodge No. 1, Seven Stars Tavern, Baltimore, Maryland, United States
- Type: Fraternal order
- Tax ID no.: 52-0363509 (Sovereign Grand Lodge)
- Legal status: 501(c)(8) fraternal benefit society
- Purpose: "Visit the sick, relieve the distressed, bury the dead and educate the orphan"
- Headquarters: Sovereign Grand Lodge
- Location: 422 Trade Street, Winston-Salem, North Carolina, United States
- Coordinates: 36.09881°N 80.246199°W
- Region served: International
- Members: 600,000 members 10,000 lodges in 26 countries
- Sovereign Grand Master: Douglas E. Pittman
- Deputy Sovereign Grand Master: E. Wesley Nelson
- Sovereign Grand Warden: Charles E. Lusk
- Affiliations: "Inter-fraternally": Independent Order of Oddfellows Manchester Unity (parent organisation 1819–1842); International Association of Rebekah Assemblies
- Revenue: $1,780,337 (Sovereign Grand Lodge) (2014)
- Expenses: $1,478,384 (Sovereign Grand Lodge) (2014)
- Staff: 14 (Sovereign Grand Lodge) (2013)
- Website: odd-fellows.org
- Remarks: Written as Odd Fellows, not to be mistaken with Oddfellows

The Independent Order of Odd Fellows (IOOF) is a non-political, non-sectarian international fraternal order of Odd Fellowship. It was founded in 1819 by Thomas Wildey in Baltimore, Maryland, United States. Evolving from the Order of Odd Fellows founded in England during the 18th century, the IOOF was originally chartered by the Independent Order of Oddfellows Manchester Unity in England but has operated as an independent organization since 1842, although it maintains an inter-fraternal relationship with the English Order. The order is also known as the Triple Link Fraternity, referring to the order's "Triple Links" symbol, alluding to its motto "Friendship, Love and Truth".

While several unofficial Odd Fellows Lodges had existed in New York City circa 1806–1818, because of its charter relationship, the American Odd Fellows is regarded as being founded with Washington Lodge No 1 in Baltimore at the Seven Stars Tavern on April 26, 1819, by Thomas Wildey along with some associates who assembled in response to an advertisement in the New Republic. The following year, the lodge affiliated with the Independent Order of Oddfellows Manchester Unity and was granted the authority to institute new lodges. Previously, Wildey had joined the Grand United Order of Oddfellows (1798–) in 1804 but followed through with the split of Independent Order of Oddfellows Manchester Unity (1810–) before immigrating to the United States in 1817.

In 1842, after a dispute on authority, the American lodges formed a governing system separate from the English Order, and in 1843 assumed the name Independent Order of Odd Fellows.

Like other fraternities, the Independent Order of Odd Fellows began by limiting their membership to white men only. On September 20, 1851, the IOOF became the first fraternity in the United States to include women when it adopted the "Beautiful Rebekah Degree" by initiative of Schuyler Colfax, later Vice President of the United States. Daughters of Rebekah are an auxiliary organization to the Odd Fellows.

Beyond fraternal and recreational activities, the Independent Order of Odd Fellows promotes the ethic of reciprocity and charity, by implied inspiration of Judeo-Christian ethics. The largest Sovereign Grand Lodge of all fraternal orders of Odd Fellows since the 19th century, it enrolls some 600,000 members from approximately 10,000 lodges into 26 countries, inter-fraternally recognized by the second largest, the British-seated Independent Order of Oddfellows Manchester Unity.

== History ==
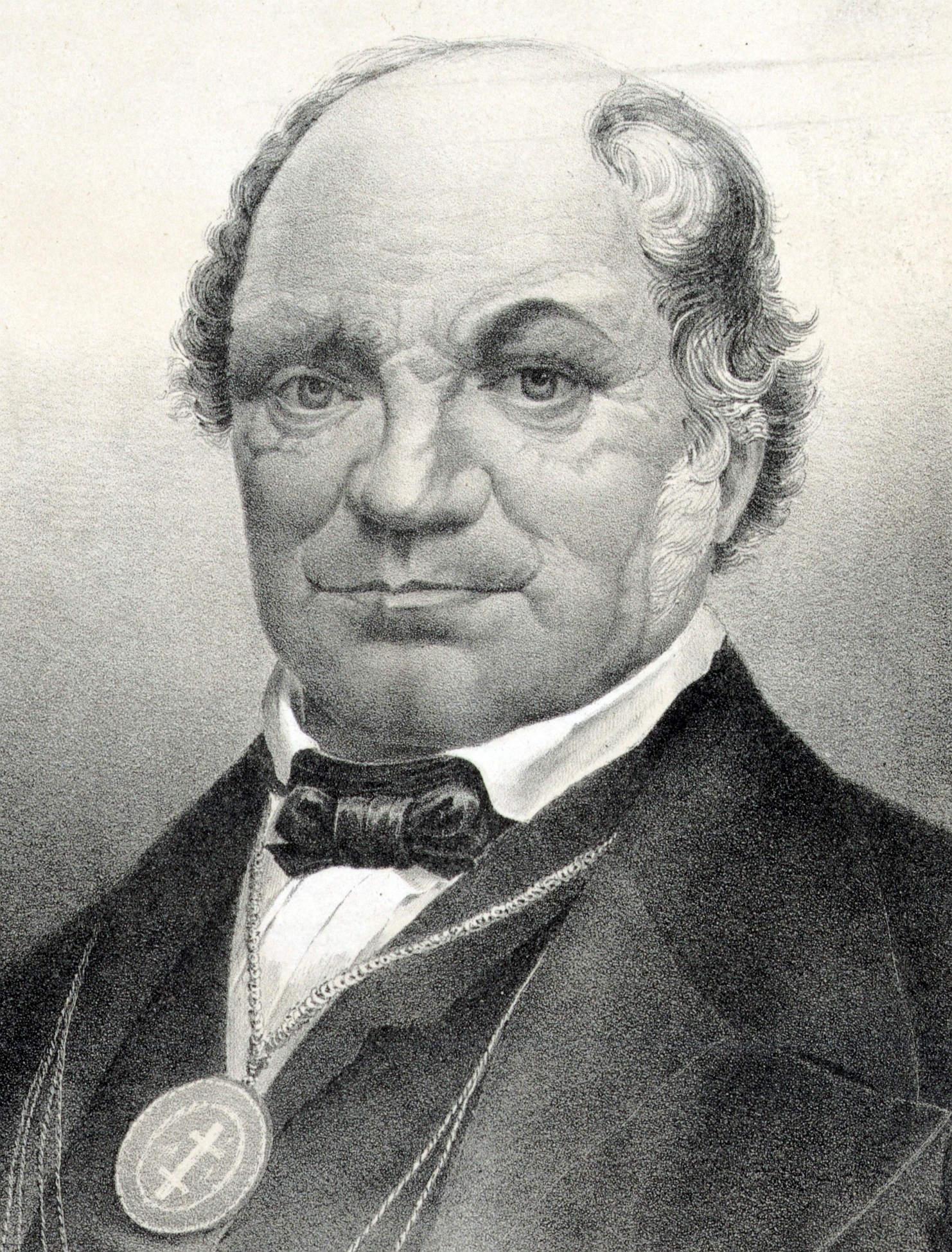
British–American Thomas Wildey (1782–1861) founder of the Washington Lodge No 1

=== Precursor ===
Odd Fellows lodges were first documented in 1730 in England from which many organizations emerged.

While several unofficial Odd Fellows lodges had existed in New York City sometime in the period 1806 to 1818, the American Odd Fellows is regarded as being founded with Washington Lodge No 1 in Baltimore at the Seven Stars Tavern on April 26, 1819, by Thomas Wildey along with some associates who assembled in response to a newspaper advertisement. The following year, the lodge affiliated with the Independent Order of Oddfellows Manchester Unity was granted the authority to institute new lodges. Wildey had joined the Grand United Order of Oddfellows in 1804, then joined its splinter order, Independent Order of Oddfellows Manchester Unity, before immigrating to the United States in 1817.

=== Foundation ===
In 1842, after an elementary dispute on whether the American lodges were to be involved in decision-making procedures, in a split along racial lines, some American Lodges formed with exclusively whites-only membership and a separate governing system from the English Order. In 1843, they changed the name of their organization to the Independent Order of Odd Fellows.

=== 19th century ===
In the following years, lodges were instituted all over the country, first in the east and later in the west. After rejection from the Independent Order of Odd Fellows due to race, an African American sailor, Peter Ogden, petitioned the Grand United Order of Oddfellows for a charter which was granted. Grand United Order of Odd Fellows in America are still headquartered in Philadelphia.

On September 20, 1851, IOOF became the first national fraternity to accept both men and women when it formed the Daughters of Rebekah as an auxiliary organization. Schuyler Colfax (Vice President of the United States (1869–1873) under President Ulysses S. Grant) was the force behind the movement. Both the Odd Fellows and Rebekahs have appendant branches known as Encampments and Patriarchs Militant.

The American Civil War (1861–1865) shattered the IOOF in America; membership decreased and many lodges were unable to continue their work, especially in the southern states. After the Civil War, with the beginning of industrialization, the deteriorating social circumstances brought large numbers of people to the IOOF and the lodges rallied.

Over the next half-century, also known as the "Golden age of fraternalism" in America, the Odd Fellows became the largest among all fraternal organizations (at the time, even larger than Freemasonry). By 1889, the IOOF had lodges in every American state. Compared to Masonic lodges, membership in the Odd Fellows lodges tended to be more common among the lower middle class and skilled workers and less common among the wealthy white collar workers and professionals.

In 1896, the World Almanac showed the Odd Fellows as the largest among all fraternal organizations.

By the late nineteenth century, the Order had spread to most of the rest of the world, establishing lodges in the Americas, Australasia, and Europe. According to the Journal of the Annual Communication of the Sovereign Grand Lodge 1922, page 426, there were a reported 2,676,582 members. While this data from 1921 may not be the exact zenith of its membership, the organization experienced a loss in membership of 23.5% between 1920 and 1930, explained in large part by the development of the commercial insurance industry, and has continually declined.

=== 20th century ===
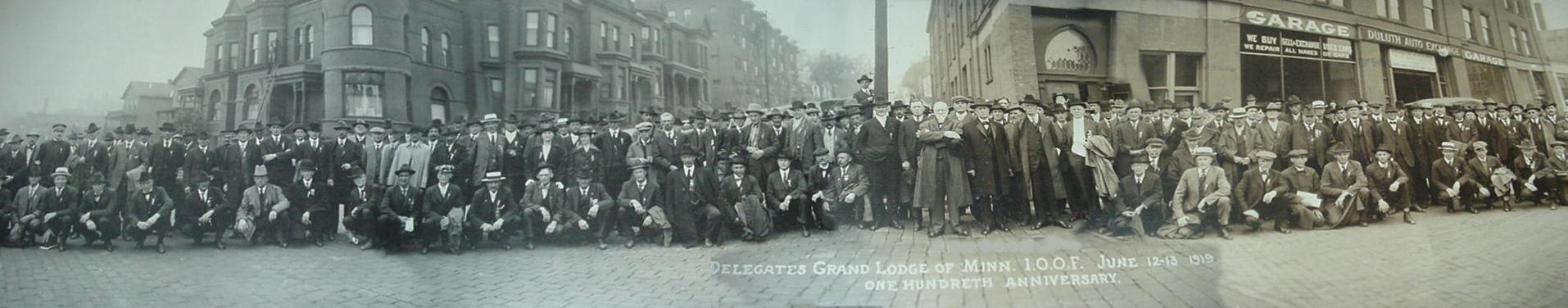
Odd Fellows celebrating the 100th anniversary of the American Oddfellowship in June 1919 at Duluth, Minnesota.

The Great Depression and the introduction of Franklin D. Roosevelt's New Deal brought a decline in membership. During the depression, people could not afford Odd Fellows membership fees, and when the New Deal's social reforms started to take effect, the need for the social work of the Odd Fellows declined.

In 1971 the IOOF changed its constitution, removing its whites only clause. In 1979 the Order had 243,000 members.

Some branches of the order (i.e., some countries) have allowed women to join the Odd Fellows itself, leading to the Rebekahs' decline in importance. Also, the appendant branches and their degrees are, in some countries, becoming regarded as less important or too time-consuming, and are gradually being abandoned.

=== 21st century ===
Although there was a decline in membership in fraternal organizations in general during the 20th century, membership in the 21st century started to increase.

The Odd Fellows scholarship has extended financial assistance to the youth for their education from time to time.

== Organization ==
=== Current status ===
The IOOF continues in the 21st century with lodges around the world, and is claimed to be the "largest united international fraternal order in the world under one head", with every lodge working with the Sovereign Grand Lodge located in the United States. Also, the Independent Order of Oddfellows Manchester Unity and the IOOF have recognized each other inter-fraternally; members of the Manchester Unity and the IOOF can visit each other's lodges, and are welcome as brothers and sisters. Currently, there are about 12,000 lodges with nearly 600,000 members.

Units of the order in the United States include:

- Odd Fellows Lodge
- Rebekahs Lodge
- Encampment
- Ladies Encampment Auxiliary (LEA)
- Patriarchs Militant
- Ladies Auxiliary Patriarchs Militant (LAPM)
- Junior Odd Fellows Lodge
- Theta Rho Girls Club
- United Youth Groups
- Zeta Lambda Tau

=== Objectives ===
As an organization, the Independent Order of Odd Fellows aims to provide a framework that promotes personal and social development. Lodge degrees and activities aim to improve and elevate every person to a higher, nobler plane; to extend sympathy and aid to those in need, making their burdens lighter, relieving the darkness of despair; to war against vice in every form, and to be a great moral power and influence for the good of humanity. Teachings in the Order are conducted through the exemplification of the Degrees of membership. The Degrees are conferred on the candidate by their Lodge, and are teachings of principles and truths by ceremonies and symbols. The Degrees are presented largely by means of allegory and drama. For Odd Fellows, the degrees in Odd Fellowship emphasize a leaving of the old life and the start of a better one, of welcoming travelers, and of helping those in need. Lodges also provide an international social network of members in 26 countries. The command of the IOOF is to "visit the sick, relieve the distressed, bury the dead and educate the orphan". Specifically, IOOF has stated the following purposes:

- To improve and elevate the character of mankind by promoting the principles of friendship, love, truth, faith, hope, charity and universal justice.
- To help make the world a better place to live by aiding each other in times of need and by organizing charitable projects and activities that would benefit the less fortunate, the youth, the elderly, the environment and the community in every way possible.
- To promote good will and harmony amongst peoples and nations through the principle of universal fraternity, holding the belief that all men and women regardless of disability, age, ethnicity, gender, race, sexual orientation, religion, or other social identity are brothers and sisters.
- To promote a wholesome fraternal experience without violence, vices and discrimination of every form.

== International ==
=== Argentina ===
There was one Odd Fellows Lodge in the country, Buenos Ayres Lodge no.1 instituted on January 1, 1903, with 32 members. The most recent report from the lodge was received by the Sovereign Grand Lodge in 1912.

=== Australasia ===
A lodge of the Order of Loyal and Independent Odd Fellows was in existence in the state of New South Wales on February 24, 1836. The lodge was established in New Zealand in 1843. An Australian Supreme Grand Lodge was established in Victoria sometime in the year 1850 and this body made negotiations for affiliation with the Grand Lodge of the United States in 1861. It is also noted that an Ancient Independent Order of Odd Fellows was in existence from 1861 to 1954 in Victoria, Tasmania and South Australia.

=== Austria ===
The Independent Order of Odd Fellows in Austria was first formed as a club in 1911. After WWI, conditions changed and the club was instituted as Friedens Lodge no.1 on June 4, 1922, in Vienna followed by Ikarius Lodge no.2, Pestalozzi Lodge no.3 and Fridtjof Nansen Lodge no.4. Mozart Lager Encampment no.1 was also instituted on June 3, 1932.

=== Belgium ===
The first lodge under the Independent Order of Odd Fellows, Belgia Lodge no.1, was instituted on June 13, 1911, in Antwerp. On March 15, 1975, Aurora Rebekah Lodge no.1 was instituted in Antwerp. Two more Odd Fellows Lodges were opened in the country.

=== Brazil ===
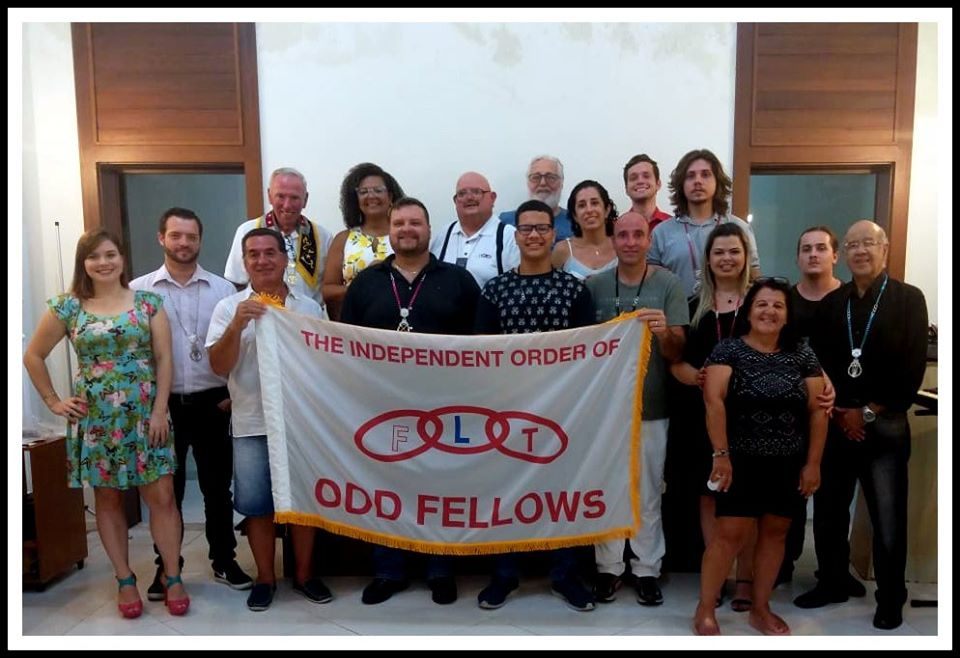

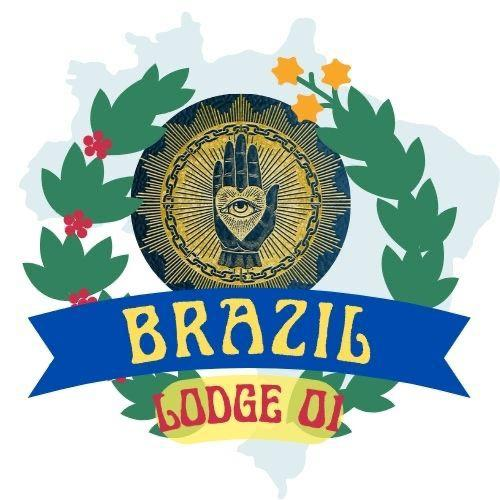

Brazil Lodge #01 is the first lodge of the Independent Order of Odd Fellows (IOOF) established in Brazil. It was officially founded on February 16, 2020, in the city of Peruíbe, in the state of São Paulo, marking the beginning of IOOF operations in the country.

==== Foundation ====
The history of the IOOF in Brazil began with Brother Gabriel Boni Sutil, a former president of a Rotaract Club (term 2011/2012) and a supporter of humanitarian and educational causes. During a trip to Europe, Gabriel came across an article about global philanthropic institutions, which deepened his interest in fraternal organizations.

After returning to Brazil, he contacted the international IOOF representative, Brother Hank Dupray. Following approximately nine months of cooperation, a delegation consisting of Hank Dupray, Michelle Heckart, and Edward Johnson traveled to Brazil. On February 16, 2020, the initiation ceremony of Brazil Lodge #01 took place, with the official charter dated February 5, 2020. Gabriel Boni Sutil became the first Noble Grand of an Odd Fellows lodge in Brazil.

==== Expansion and development ====
Shortly after its foundation, the COVID-19 pandemic forced the lodge to adapt its activities to a remote format, including the translation and study of the Order's materials. Over time, Cuban refugees—already Odd Fellows members in Cuba—joined the Brazilian lodge. Together with Brazilian members, they are currently working on the establishment of a second lodge in the country, to be named Esperança Cuba Brasil – Lodge #02.

Since its foundation, Brazil Lodge #01 has been promoting Oddfellism in Brazil, providing information and support to initiatives aimed at establishing new lodges currently underway in various cities and states, such as São Paulo, Curitiba, Rio de Janeiro, Sorocaba, Ceará, and Rio Grande do Sul.

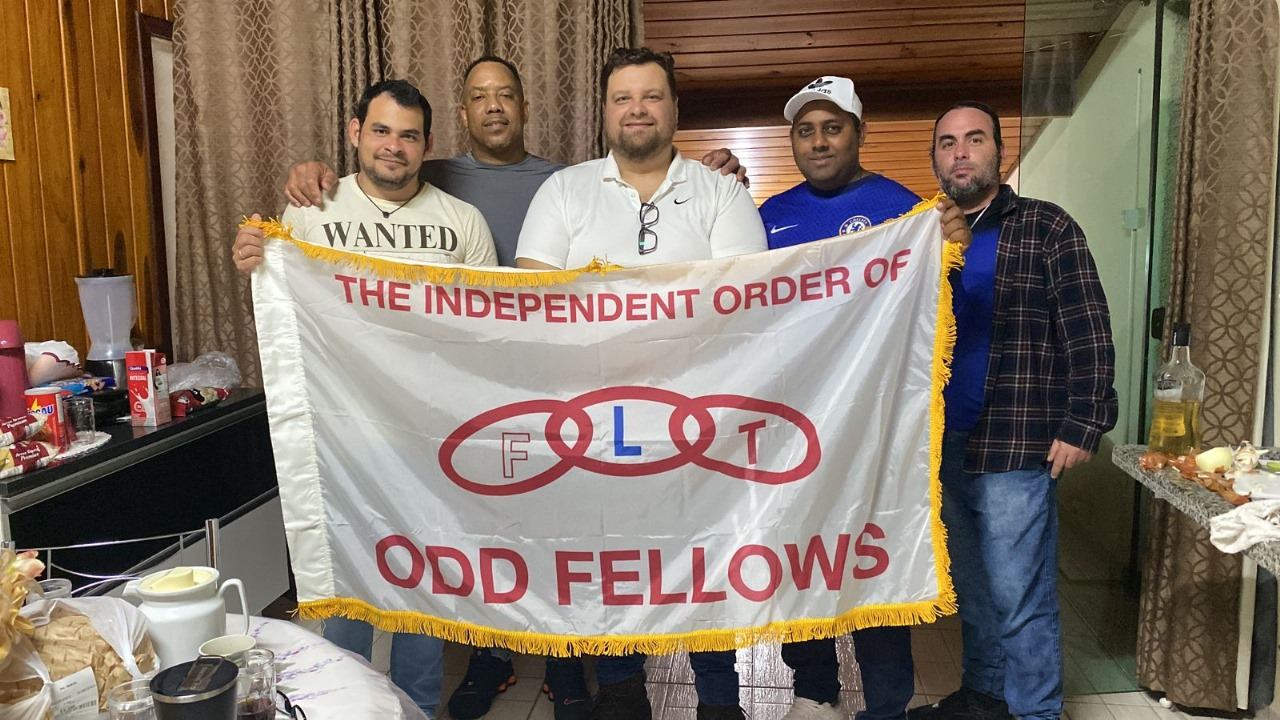

==== Educational foundation ====
The Odd Fellows Brasil Escola (Odd Fellows Brazil School) is an educational initiative developed by Brazil Lodge #01. The foundation offers free volunteer classes in Portuguese, Brazilian history, and culture, primarily aimed at refugees and people in vulnerable situations.

==== Humanitarian Actions ====
Among the Order's notable projects in Brazil is the organization of an online concert to raise food donations, as well as partnerships with local institutions. One example is the renovation of a library at a children's shelter in the city of Peruíbe.

==== National expansion ====
The IOOF in Brazil is currently working with various individuals and communities interested in establishing new lodges across the country. These efforts aim to consolidate a future Sovereign Grand Lodge of Brazil.

=== Canada ===
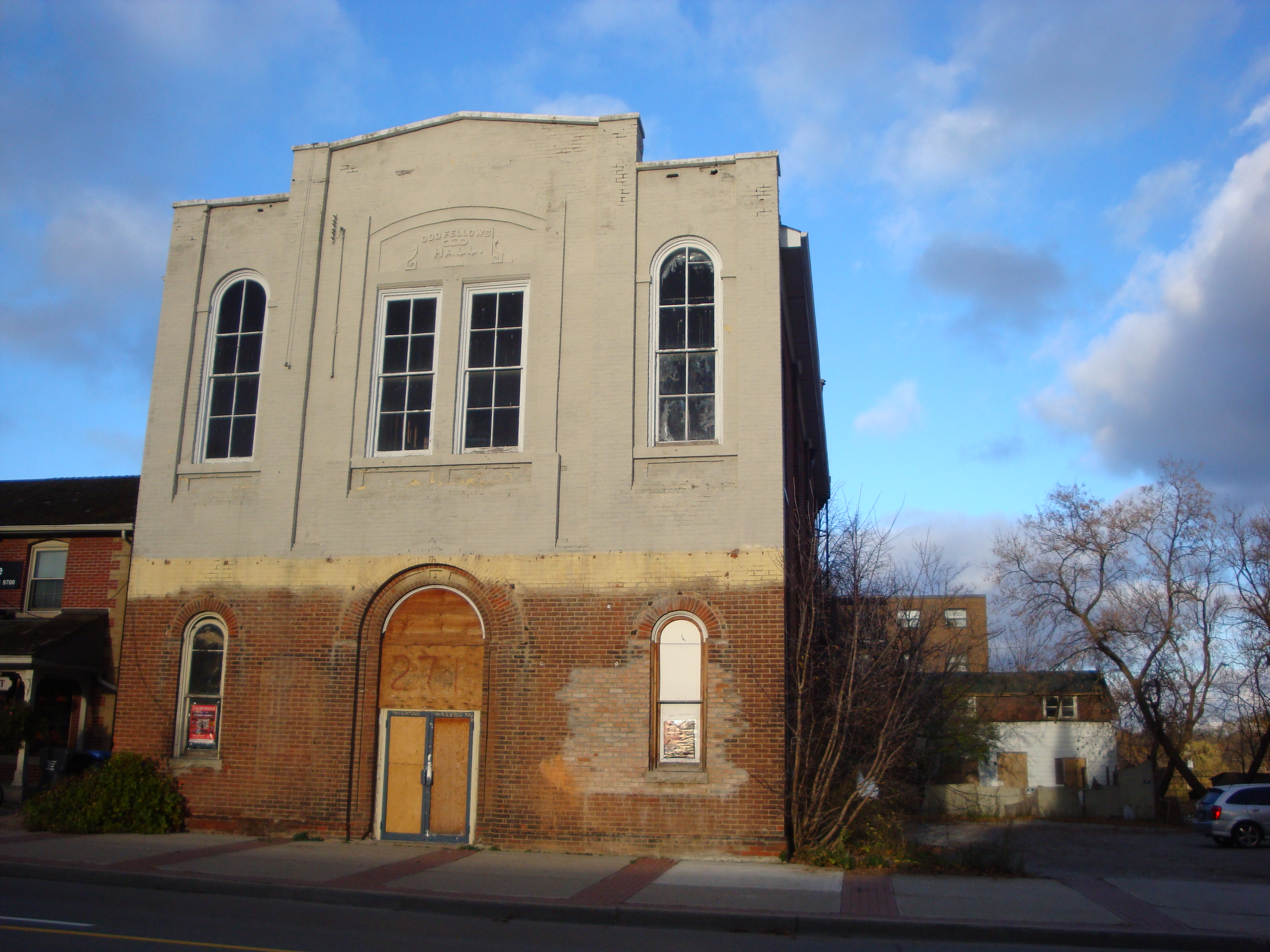
Oddfellows' Hall in Streetsville, Mississauga, Ontario, built in 1867. The building was sold in 1972.

Two lodges under the Manchester Unity of Independent Order of Odd Fellows known as Royal Wellington Lodge no.1 and Loyal Bon Accorde Lodge no.2 existed in Halifax, Nova Scotia, as early as 1815. The IOOF in Canada has 7 Grand Lodges, namely: Grand Lodge of Alberta, Grand Lodge of Atlantic Provinces, Grand Lodge of British Columbia, Grand Lodge of Manitoba, Grand Lodge of Ontario, Grand Lodge of Quebec and Grand Lodge of Saskatchewan.

=== Chile ===
The first Lodge under the Independent Order of Odd Fellows, known as Valparaiso Lodge No.1, was instituted by Dr. Cornelius Logan, Grand Sire, on April 15, 1874. Four additional lodges were instituted in the following years, and a Grand Lodge of Chile was instituted on November 18, 1875. However, due to the political situation in the country, the lodges in the country were reduced to 3 active lodges in 1888 and the charter of the Grand Lodge was surrendered. In September 2012, there were 3 Odd Fellows Lodges and 3 Rebekahs Lodges in the country.

=== Cuba ===
The Independent Order of Odd Fellows was established in Cuba when Porvenir Lodge no.1 was instituted in Havana on August 26, 1883. More lodges were then instituted the following years. In 2012 there were about 116 Odd Fellows Lodges, 50 Rebekahs Lodges, 33 Encampments, 12 cantons and 2 Junior Lodges, totaling to about 15,000 members in Cuba.

=== Czech Republic ===
The first attempt to establish the Independent Order of Odd Fellows in what later became the Czech Republic was in 1905 through the formation of Friendship Lodge No. 8 in Saxony. But the unstable political and social condition of the country hampered development. The actual development of the IOOF began after the creation of Czechoslovakia. However, Lodges were banned and cancelled during WWII. The IOOF began to re-activate lodges in 1989, building the first Odd Fellows Hall in the Czech Republic in 1996. In 2010, Martel Rebekah Lodge No.4 was founded as the lodge for women.

=== Denmark ===
The Independent Order of Odd Fellows was established in the Kingdom of Denmark in 1878 and the Rebekahs in 1881. In September 2012, IOOF had over 112 Odd Fellow Lodges and 94 Rebekah Lodges, with a total membership of 14,500 in Denmark. The IOOF Grand Lodge headquarters of the Kingdom of Denmark is located at the Odd Fellow Palace in Copenhagen.

=== Dominican Republic ===
The Independent Order of Odd Fellows was formally established in the Dominican Republic when Dr. Joaquin Balaguer Lodge no.1 was founded on February 24, 2007, in the City of San Cristobal.

=== Estonia ===
The Independent Order of Odd Fellows was founded in Estonia when 1 Odd Fellows Lodge was founded by the Grand Lodge of Finland in 1993 and a Rebekah lodge in 1995.

=== Finland ===
After the Independent Order of Odd Fellows Grand Lodge of Sweden was established in 1895, the interest in Odd Fellowship was awakened in Finland. After Finland had declared independence in 1917, the idea of an Odd Fellows Lodge in Finland was raised again. A few interested people from the town Vaasa in Ostrobothnia province were able to join the Swedish Odd Fellow lodges until the Sovereign Grand Lodge finally permitted the Grand Lodge of Sweden to officially establish the IOOF in Finland in 1925. The first lodge established was named Wasa Lodge no.1 in the coastal town of Vaasa. Additional lodges were then formed in Helsinki in 1927 and a third lodge in Turku in 1931. Odd Fellows in Finland encountered great difficulties in the 1930s and during the wartime. Especially the question of premises was quite difficult for many years. However, all three lodges which had been established before the war continued their activities almost without interruption. Only after the war, in the year 1951 was the next lodge established. Since then, the development has been steady and quite rapid. In the beginning of the 1980s, the number of brother lodges was 35 and the number of sister lodges 19 leading to the institution of the Grand Lodge of Finland on June 2, 1984. In the year 2008, there were 57 Odd Fellows lodges and 48 Rebekah lodges in Finland with about 8,200 members.

=== Germany ===
The first lodge under the Independent Order of Odd Fellows was established on December 1, 1870, in Württemberg, Germany, by Dr. John F. Morse, a Past Grand Master in California and a member of California Odd Fellows Lodge No. 1 of San Francisco, California, U.S.A. After the institution of Württemberg Lodge, other lodges were instituted including Germania Lodge No. 1 in Berlin on March 30, 1871; Helvetia Lodge No. 1 in Zurich, Switzerland on April 2, 1871; Saxonia Lodge No. 1 in Dresden on June 6, 1871; and Schiller Lodge No. 3 in Stuttgart on May 25, 1872. During the first decades, many lodges were instituted including 56 lodges in the 1870s, 20 lodges in the 1880s, 41 lodges in the 1890s, and the membership totaled almost 4,000 brothers. The formal establishment of the IOOF Grand Lodge of the German Empire was on December 28, 1872.

=== Iceland ===
The Independent Order of Odd Fellows in Iceland was founded in August 1897 under the Jurisdiction of the IOOF Grand Lodge of Kingdom of Denmark, until it established the Grand Lodge of Iceland on January 31, 1948. In December 2017, there were 28 Odd Fellows Lodges, 18 Rebekah Lodges, 6 Odd Fellow Encampments and 5 Rebekah Encampments – about 3,900 members.

=== Italy ===
The Independent Order of Odd Fellows was first introduced in the country when Colombo Lodge no.1 was instituted in Naples in 1895.

=== Mexico ===
The first lodge in Mexico under the Independent Order of Odd Fellows, known as Ridgely Lodge no.1, was instituted on August 5, 1882. Several Lodges were opened the following years reaching up to 5 Lodges in 1895. However, the political situation affected their progress. In 2012, there was one Odd Fellows Lodge and one Rebekah Lodge re-instituted in 1996.

=== Netherlands ===
Paradijs Loge nr. 1 (Paradise Lodge No. 1) was founded in Amsterdam on March 19, 1877, by L. Elkan and G.E. van Erpen, former members of an Odd Fellows lodge in the United States. This initiative commenced in 1876, but initially the Dutch Government was not pleased. It subsequently stopped its resistance later in the same year. The translation of the rituals was the next problem, combined with the recognition by the Soeverine Loge (Sovereign Grand Lodge). Eventually the founder of the German Order, Ostheim, was appointed Gedeputeerd Groot Sire voor Nederland and installed the first Dutch board. In 1899, lodges were established in The Hague and Groningen. Also in 1899, the first Nederlandse Grootorde (Grand Lodge of Netherlands) was founded. On September 2, 1911, the first Belgian Lodge, Belgia Loge nr. 201, was established in Antwerp, and the Order changed its name to Orde in Nederland en België.

=== Nigeria ===
Various orders of Odd Fellows have existed in Nigeria since the 1800s. The Independent Order of Odd Fellows re-established lodges in the country in 2008. In January 2012, there were four Odd Fellow lodges in the country.

=== Norway ===
The Independent Order of Odd Fellows was established in Norway in 1898 and is one of the strongest jurisdictions in terms of membership. In January 2010, there were 151 Odd Fellow Lodges and 125 Rebekah Lodges and about 23,414 members in the country.

=== Panama ===
The Independent Order of Odd Fellows, Isthmian Canal Lodge No. 1, was instituted at Gorgona, September 17, 1907, in Panama. The charter was secured upon the application of named petitioners. Officers were installed. A special meeting was announced to institute a class of 25 on October 5, 1907.

=== Poland ===
The Independent Order of Odd Fellows was established in Poland in Poznan in 1876 and in Wroclaw (then Breslau) in 1879. A Regional Grand Lodge of Silesia and Poznan was established in 1885, which opened lodges in Bydgoszcz in 1895, Gniezno in 1896, Torun in 1898, Gdansk in 1899, Pila 1899 and Grudziadz in 1901. After World War I, six Odd Fellows lodges worked in the Polish lands: in Poznań "Kosmos-Loge" in Inowroclaw "Astrea-Loge" in Bydgoszcz "Emanuel Schweizer Gedächnits Loge" in Gniezno "Friedens-Loge" in Torun "Coppernicus -Loge" and Grudziadz "Ostheim-Loge." Moreover, in Gdansk Gedania-Loge "and the camp" Vistula-Lager" existed. In addition to the above-mentioned, there were 18 IOOF lodges in the Lower Silesia, including as many as five in Wroclaw, "Morse", "Moltke," Phönix "Freundschaft" and "Caritas". In the years 1925 to 1926, they built a new, modern building for their headquarters. It was projected by A. Radig, and it stands in today's Hallera Street in Wroclaw.

=== Puerto Rico ===
The Independent Order of Odd Fellows was formally established in Puerto Rico when Boriken Lodge No. 1 was instituted on November 6, 1899, with the help of several members from Florida, New Jersey and New York Lodges of the IOOF. Naborias Rebekahs Lodge No. 1 was also formed in the country.

=== Philippines ===
Filipinos first embraced the fraternalism of the Odd Fellows during the revolutionary era as a reaction to the perceived abuses by their Spanish colonists, and by 1898, had formed several military lodges and Odd Fellows Association in Manila. According to their own records, the early membership consisted primarily of military officers and government officials. The organization failed during World War II, and was not reformed until November 21, 2009. In 2019 there were 25 active Odd Fellows lodges, 1 Rebekah Lodge, 3 Encampments and 2 Cantons of the Patriarchs Militant located in various towns and cities in the country.

=== Spain ===
Andalucia Rebekah Lodge no.1 was established in 1995, and Costa del Sol Lodge no.1 was founded in the country by members of the IOOF from Denmark and Norway in 2002.

=== Sweden ===
The Independent Order of Odd Fellows in Sweden was first established in Malmo, Sweden, in 1884, and a Grand Lodge of the Kingdom of Sweden was instituted in 1895. In 2012, Sweden held the strongest membership in IOOF with more than 174 Odd Fellow Lodges, 113 Rebekah Lodges, and over 40,000 members.

=== Switzerland ===
The Independent Order of Odd Fellows was first established in Switzerland on June 19, 1871, when Helvetia Lodge no.1 was instituted in Zurich by Dr. Morse of California and Mr. Schaettle and Bernheim, members of the fraternity in Germany. The IOOF Grand Lodge of Switzerland was established on April 22, 1874.

=== Uruguay ===
The first Lodge under the Independent Order of Odd Fellows was established in Uruguay on February 9, 1966, known as Artigas Lodge no.1. The Rebekahs was also established on November 19, 1966, known as Amanecer Rebekah Lodge no.1. Additional lodges, Uruguay Lodge no.2, Horizontes Rebekah Lodge no.2 and El Ceibo Lodge have been instituted and 5 lodges meet in the same hall in Montevideo.

=== Venezuela ===
The first lodge under the Independent Order of Odd Fellows was founded in the City of Caracas, Venezuela, on August 2, 1986, known as Pakritti Lodge no.1.

=== Regional grand lodges ===
Seal of the IOOF Grand Lodge of Europe, chartered in 2006, instituted in June 2007 in Oslo, Norway.

There are IOOF lodges in at least 29 countries: Each Grand Lodge has a number of subordinate lodges that report to them.

Region	Total Grand Lodges	Regions / Jurisdictions / Countries (Date established)	Ref
Africa	0	Liberia (1874)*, Nigeria (2008)*,	
Asia	0	Philippines (1872)*	
Australasia	6	Australasia, New South Wales (1836), New Zealand (1843), South Australia, Tasmania, Western Australia	
Canada	8	Canada (1843), Alberta, Atlantic Provinces, British Columbia (1864), Manitoba, Ontario, Quebec (1878), Saskatchewan	
Europe	13	Europe (2006), Austria, Czech Republic (1877)*, Denmark (1878), Estonia (1993)*, Finland (1925), France (1884)*, Germany (1870), Iceland (1897), Netherlands & Belgium (1911), Norway (1898), Poland (1938)*, Spain*, Sweden (1895), Switzerland (1871)	
Central America	2	Belize*, Dominican Republic*, Cuba (1883), America Latina (Cuba), Mexico (1882), Puerto Rico (1999)*,	
South America	1	Chile (1874), Uruguay*, Venezuela,	
United Kingdom	0	(The IOOF in United Kingdom is under the mother chapter, Manchester Unity.)	
United States of America	51	Sovereign Grand Lodge (1819), Alabama, Arizona (1884), Arkansas, California (1847), Colorado (1860), Connecticut, Delaware, District of Columbia, Florida, Georgia, Hawaii (1846), Idaho, Illinois (1838), Indiana, Iowa, Kansas, Kentucky, Louisiana, Maine, Maryland, Massachusetts, Michigan, Minnesota, Mississippi, Missouri (1834), Montana, Nebraska, Nevada, New Hampshire, New Jersey, New Mexico, New York (1806), North Carolina, North Dakota, Ohio, Oklahoma (1875), Oregon, Pennsylvania (1821), Rhode Island, South Carolina, South Dakota, Tennessee, Texas, Utah, Vermont, Virginia, Washington (1878), West Virginia, Wisconsin (1835), Wyoming	
Totals	81		

== Degrees and initiation ==
In the IOOF system of initiatory progression, different degrees and degree types are conferred upon Odd Fellows depending upon whether the member in question is initiated into the Daughters of Rebekah or into the Odd Fellows proper.

For Odd Fellows specifically, four lodge degrees; three higher encampment degrees; and one superlative Patriarchs Militant degree are conferred.

For Rebekahs, one lodge degree, one encampment degree, and one Ladies Auxiliary Patriarchs Militant (LAPM) degree are conferred.

The Ancient Mystic Order of Samaritans (AMOS), an IOOF appendant body, confers two degrees. The Ladies of the Orient (LOTO), an appendant body of the Daughters of Rebekahs, similarly confers two degrees.

=== Oddfellow degrees ===
==== Lodge degrees ====
- Initiatory (White degree)
- Friendship (First degree, Pink degree)
- "Brotherly" Love (Second degree, Blue degree)
- Truth (Third degree, Scarlet degree)

==== Encampment degrees ====
- Patriarchal (Faith degree)
- Golden Rule (Hope degree)
- Royal Purple (Charity degree)

==== Patriarchs Militant degree ====
- Chevalier (Patriarch Militant degree)

=== Rebekah degrees ===
==== Lodge degree ====
- Rebekah degree

==== Ladies Encampment Auxiliary (LEA) degree ====
- LEA degree

==== Ladies Auxiliary Patriarchs Militant (LAPM) degree ====
- LAPM degree

=== AMOS degrees ===
- Humility (Samaritan degree)
- Perfection (Sheikh degree)

=== Ladies of the Orient (LOTO) degrees ===
- Persecution
- Purification

== Symbols and regalia ==
Seal of the Sovereign Grand Lodge of the IOOF, from certificate (1871).

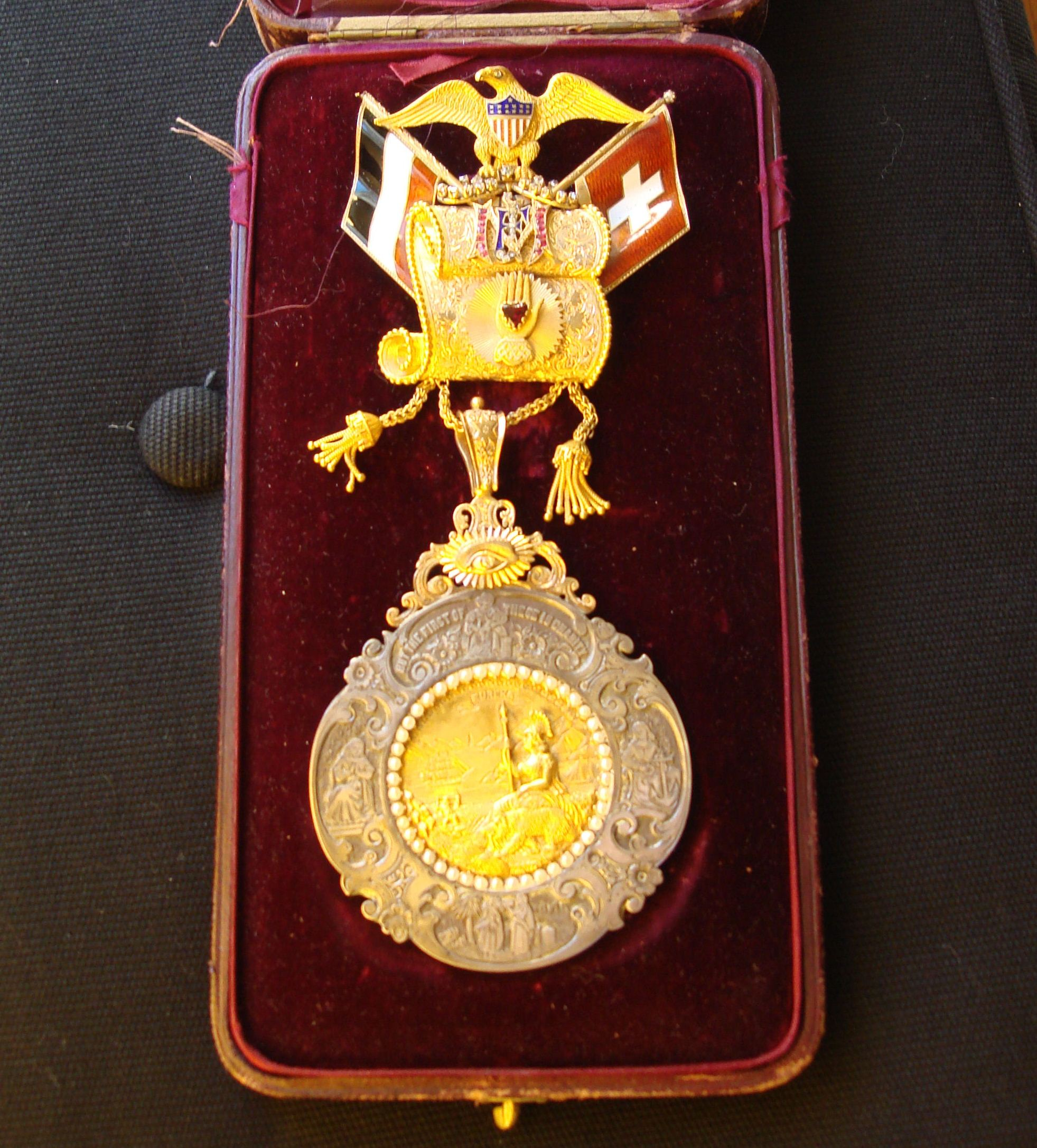
Dr. John Morse's District Deputy Grand Sire of Europe medallion

To fully understand the purposes and principles of Odd Fellowship, instruction in ceremonial form is divided into degrees. These degrees are dramatic in form and aim to emulate and impart the principles of the fraternity: Friendship, Love, Truth, Faith, Hope, Charity and Universal Justice. Each degree consists of symbols that aim to teach a practical moral code and encourages members to live and act upon them to enact positive change upon the world. In the past, when most Odd Fellows lodges offered financial benefits for the sick and distressed members, such symbols, passwords and hand signs were used as proof of membership and to protect the lodge funds from impostors. These symbols, signs and passwords have been carried forward to modern times as a tradition. The most widely encountered symbol of the IOOF – on signs, buildings and gravemarkers – is the three-link chain ("the Chain With Three Links", the "Triple Links") with initials 'F', 'L' and 'T' signifying Friendship, Love and Truth.

=== Female auxiliaries ===
The Rebekah Lodges were founded on September 20, 1851, when, after considerable debate, the Sovereign Grand Lodge of the Independent Order of Odd Fellows voted to adopt the Rebekah Degree, largely due to the efforts of Schuyler Colfax. The first Rebekah Degrees were honorary awards only, conferred on wives and daughters of Odd Fellows at special lodge meetings, and recipients were known as "Daughters of Rebekah," taken from the Biblical character of Rebekah.

- International Association of Rebekah Assemblies
  - Theta Rho Girls

=== Ancient Mystic Order of Samaritans ===
The Ancient Mystic Order of Samaritans (AMOS) is an unofficial, oriental-styled auxiliary body of the Independent Order of Odd Fellows, formed in 1924 by amalgamation of several previous bodies dating back to the end of the 19th century. Only male Odd Fellows in good standing with their subordinate lodges are eligible to join. In 1950, the Sovereign Grand Lodge recognized AMOS as "The Playground of Odd Fellowship." AMOS is only presently active in the United States and Canada, though it once also existed in Cuba and the Panama Canal Zone.

=== Junior lodge ===
The Junior Lodge was established in 1921 initially under the name the Loyal Sons of the Junior Order of Odd fellows, for boys interested in odd fellowship. The ritual and ceremonies were supervised by a member of the senior order. There were 4,873 members in 1970. Membership is open to boys of age 8–21, its motto being "Honor and Fidelity", and its symbolic colours silver and dark blue.

=== Baltimore monument ===
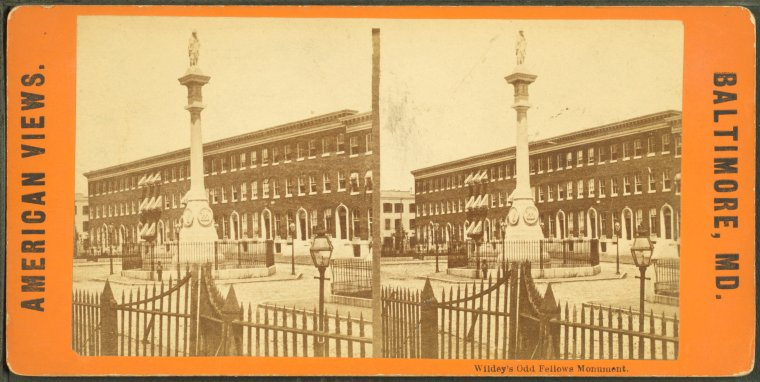
Stereoscopic image of the Wildey monument in Baltimore, taken circa 1875.

In April 1865, a monument was erected to Wildey in Baltimore, consisting of a statue atop a Doric column that is 52 feet in height. The monument is located on 123 North Broadway at Lamley St. (between East Baltimore and East Fayette Streets).

== Notable members ==
Some notable members are:

- James Ashman, Los Angeles City Council
- Warren Austin, mayor, Senator (Vermont 1931–1946), Ambassador to the UN
- Hugo Black, politician and jurist
- Owen Brewster, lawyer, politician, Governor, Senator
- Wilber M. Brucker, Governor of Michigan (1931–1932)
- Elwood Bruner, California state legislator in the 1890s
- William Jennings Bryan, U.S. Secretary of State (1913–1915)
- Robert C. Byrd, U.S. Senator (1959–2010)
- Edwin Hubbell Chapin, Universalist minister, author, lecturer, and social reformer
- Charlie Chaplin, comedic actor and film director
- John Simpson Chisum, Cattle baron in Texas and New Mexico (1824–1884)
- Parley P. Christensen, Utah and California politician, Esperantist
- Ernest E. Cole, Commissioner of Education for New York State (1940–1942)
- Schuyler Colfax, U.S. Vice President (1869–1873)
- John J. Cornwell, Governor (WV) and Senator (MD)
- Ulysses S. Grant, 18th U.S. President (1869–1877)
- Warren Harding, 29th U.S. President (1921–1923)
- Rutherford Hayes, 19th U.S. President (1877–1881)
- Thomas Hendricks, 21st Vice President of the United States
- Orange Jacobs, Chief justice of the supreme court of The Territory of Washington (1871–1875), U.S. Congressman from the Washington Territory (1875–1879), Mayor of Seattle (1879–1880)
- Anson Jones, Last President of the Republic of Texas
- Nathan Kelley, architect of Ohio State House
- Goodwin Knight, Governor of California
- Charles Lindbergh, American aviator, author, inventor, explorer and early environmentalist
- Albert Dutton MacDade, Pennsylvania State Senator (1921–1929), Judge Pennsylvania Court of Common Pleas, Delaware County (1942–1948)
- William McKinley, 25th U.S. President (1897–1901)
- David Myers, Justice of the Indiana Supreme Court (1917-1934)
- Robert Pfeifle, 3rd mayor of Bethlehem, Pennsylvania
- Albert Pike, author, poet, orator, editor, lawyer, jurist and Confederate States Army general
- William Marsh Rice, Founder of Rice University
- John Buchanan Robinson, U.S. Congressman from Pennsylvania's 6th congressional district (1891–1897)
- Franklin D. Roosevelt, 32nd U.S. President (1933–1945)
- George B. Sparkman, 19th & 22nd Mayor of Tampa (1881–1883, 1887–1888)
- Levi and Matilda Stanley, considered as King and Queen of the Gypsies
- Ele Stansbury, 23rd Indiana Attorney General (1917-1921)
- David Ivar Swanson, member of the Illinois House of Representatives beginning in 1922
- Lucy Hobbs Taylor, first U.S. female dentist
- Earl Warren, U.S. Chief Justice (1953–1969)
- Albert Winn, U.S. Army general (1810–1883)
- George W. Wolff, Wisconsin politician

== See also ==
- Odd Fellows Hall
- List of Odd Fellows buildings
