= Knights of Columbus =

Catholic fraternal service organization founded in 1882

- Abbreviation: KOC
- Formation: March 29, 1882; 144 years ago
- Founder: Michael J. McGivney
- Founded at: New Haven, Connecticut, U.S.
- Type: Catholic fraternal service order
- Headquarters: Knights of Columbus Building, New Haven, Connecticut, U.S.
- Supreme Knight: Patrick E. Kelly
- Supreme Chaplain: William E. Lori
- Affiliations: International Alliance of Catholic Knights; Columbian Squires; Squire Roses; Columbiettes
- Website: www.kofc.org

The Knights of Columbus (KOC) is a global Catholic fraternal service order founded by Michael J. McGivney, who was later beatified by the Church. Membership is limited to practicing Catholic men. It is led by Patrick E. Kelly, the order's 14th Supreme Knight.

The organization was founded on March 29, 1882, as a mutual benefit society for working-class and immigrant Catholics in the United States. In addition to providing an insurance system for its members, it has grown to support refugee relief, Catholic education, local parishes and dioceses, and global Catholic social causes. The Knights of Columbus have played an active role in politics ever since its formation, and promote the Catholic view on public policy issues around the world.

The organization also provides certain financial services to the individual and institutional Catholic market. Its wholly owned insurance company, a Fortune 1000 company based on its annual revenue, underwrites more than two million insurance contracts, totaling more than $124 billion of life insurance in force as of 2026. The order also owns the Knights of Columbus Asset Advisors, a money management firm which invests in accordance with Catholic social teachings.

As of 2026, the Knights reported having over 2.2 million members around the world. Women may participate in KOC through the Columbiettes and other female auxiliaries, and boys may join the Columbian Squires. The Order comprises four different "degrees", each one of which exemplifies one of the core principles of the order. There are more than 17,000 local Knights of Columbus councils around the world, including over 400 on college campuses.

== History ==
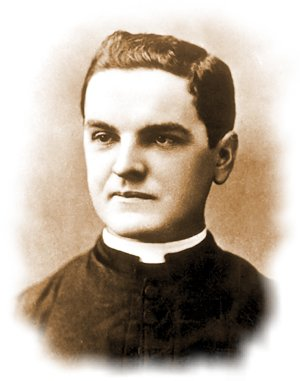
Michael J. McGivney, founder of the Knights of Columbus

=== Early years ===
American Catholic priest Michael J. McGivney founded the Knights of Columbus at St. Mary's Church in 1882 as a mutual benefit society for Catholic immigrants in New Haven, Connecticut. As a parish priest in an immigrant community, McGivney saw what could happen to a family when the main income earner died. This was before most government support programs were established. Because of religious and ethnic discrimination, Catholics in the late 19th century were regularly excluded from labor unions, popular fraternal organizations, and other organized groups that provided such social services.

Although its first councils were all in Connecticut, the Order spread throughout New England and the United States in subsequent years. As the order expanded outside of Connecticut, structural changes in the late 1880s and 1890s were instituted to give the Knights a federalist system with local, state, and national levels of government. This allowed them to coordinate activities across states and localities.

=== 20th century ===
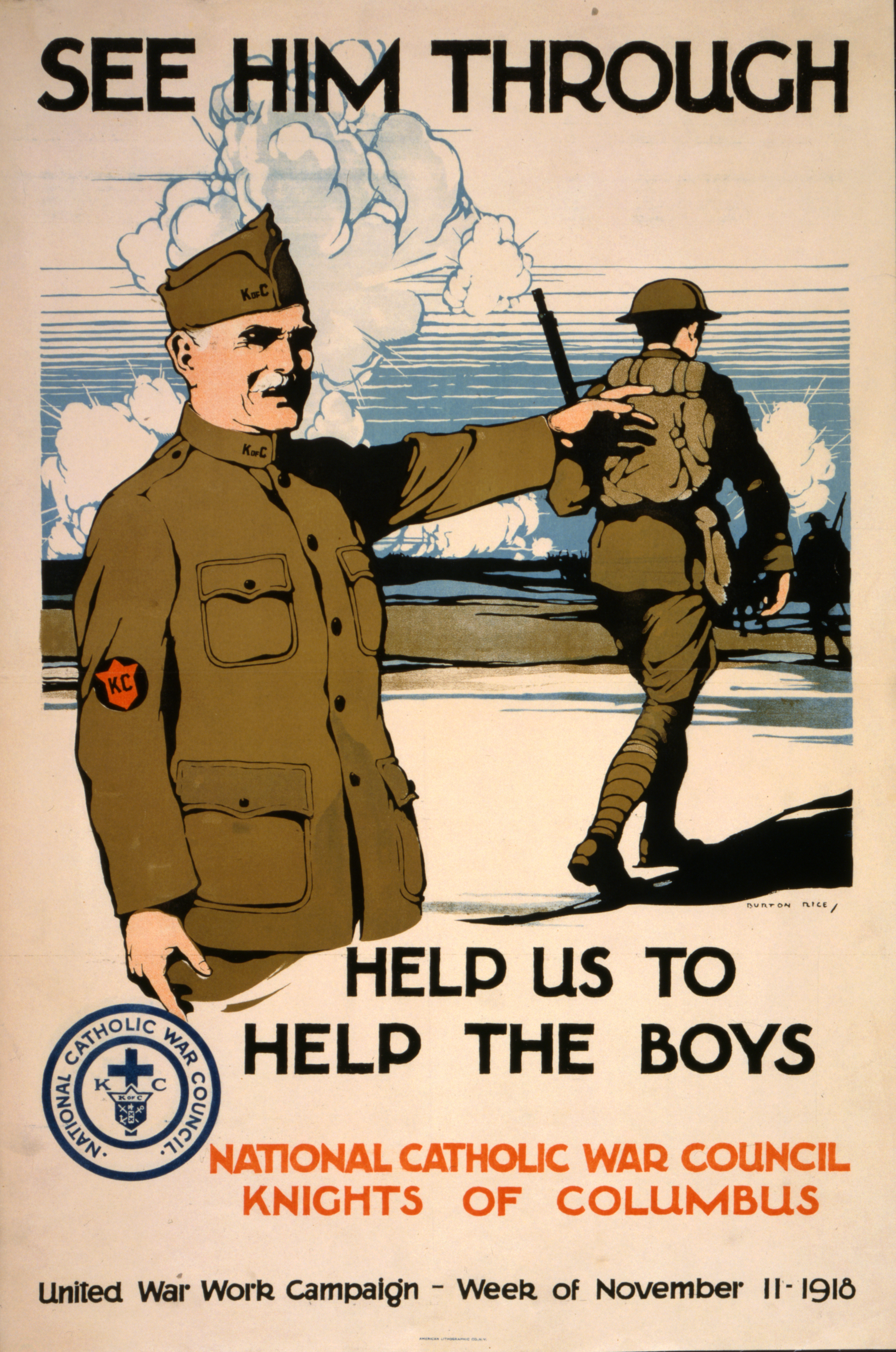
Poster showing a man in Knights of Columbus uniform gesturing toward soldiers in battle

During World War I, the Knights established soldiers' welfare centers in the U.S. and abroad. After the war, the Knights participated in education, occupational training, and employment programs for veterans.

The Oregon Compulsory Education Act of 1922 would have disallowed parochial schools, including Catholic schools, in that state. The Knights of Columbus challenged the law in court with the ACLU, and, in a landmark 1925 ruling (Pierce v. Society of Sisters), the U.S. Supreme Court struck it down.

To combat the animus targeted at racial and religious minorities, including Catholics, the Order formed a historical commission which published a series of books in the 1920s on their contributions, among other activities. The "Knights of Columbus Racial Contributions Series" of books included three titles: The Gift of Black Folk: The Negroes in the Making of America, by W. E. B. Du Bois, The Jews in the Making of America by George Cohen, and The Germans in the Making of America by Frederick Schrader.

The Knights of Columbus "was the only American fraternal society which did not, by its constitution, prohibit Negro [sic] membership", according to historian Christopher Kauffman. During World War I, the Knights were designated as the official agency for supporting Catholic troops, and its support facilities were the only racially integrated facilities open to troops. Emmett Jay Scott wrote, "Unlike the other social welfare organizations operating in the war, it never drew the color line." During the Cristero War, the Knights of Columbus supported persecuted Catholics in Mexico. Nine Knights were later beatified or canonized for their martyrdom during the Cristero War.

As the Knights grew and expanded, some councils in the United States were integrated, and others were not. An example of an integrated council was Sheridan Council 119 in Southborough, Massachusetts. Samuel F. Williams, a black man, was a member and among other activities, spoke on the stage of the 1896 Knights of Columbus Massachusetts State Convention to an audience that included two future Supreme Knights. The path to individual membership in a local Knights council did not explicitly exclude African Americans. Each local council voted in new members, and as few as four or five negative votes against a prospective candidate (no matter the size of the council) was enough to deny someone entry. Joseph Bertrand, who graduated from the University of Notre Dame in 1954, was blackballed from joining a Chicago-area Knights council in 1963 after being nominated by Gene Liner. Liner said that as the vote was announced, "I just watched his face. There were five black balls." Liner then resigned his office in the Knights chapter along with five other council leaders.

Meanwhile, Church officials and organizations increasingly encouraged integration. By the end of the 1950s, KoC Supreme Knight Luke E. Hart was actively encouraging councils to accept black candidates. In 1963, Hart attended a special meeting at the White House hosted by President John F. Kennedy to discuss civil rights with other religious leaders. After the rejection of Joseph Bertrand's membership application in Chicago, Hart declared that the process for membership would be revised at the next Supreme Convention so that membership rejections would require a majority vote of local council members. The change occurred but Hart died before he could see it take place.

Around 1915, during the nadir of American race relations, the Ku Klux Klan began promoting a conspiracy theory claiming that Fourth Degree Knights swore an oath to exterminate Freemasons and Protestants. The Knights of Columbus vehemently denied the existence of any such oath, calling the rumors libel. In 1923, the Knights of Columbus offered $25,000 to any person with proof that the fake oath attributed to the fourth-degree membership was part of any authentic ceremony. The Knights began suing distributors for libel in an effort to stop this, and the KKK ended its publication of the false oath.

=== Recent history ===
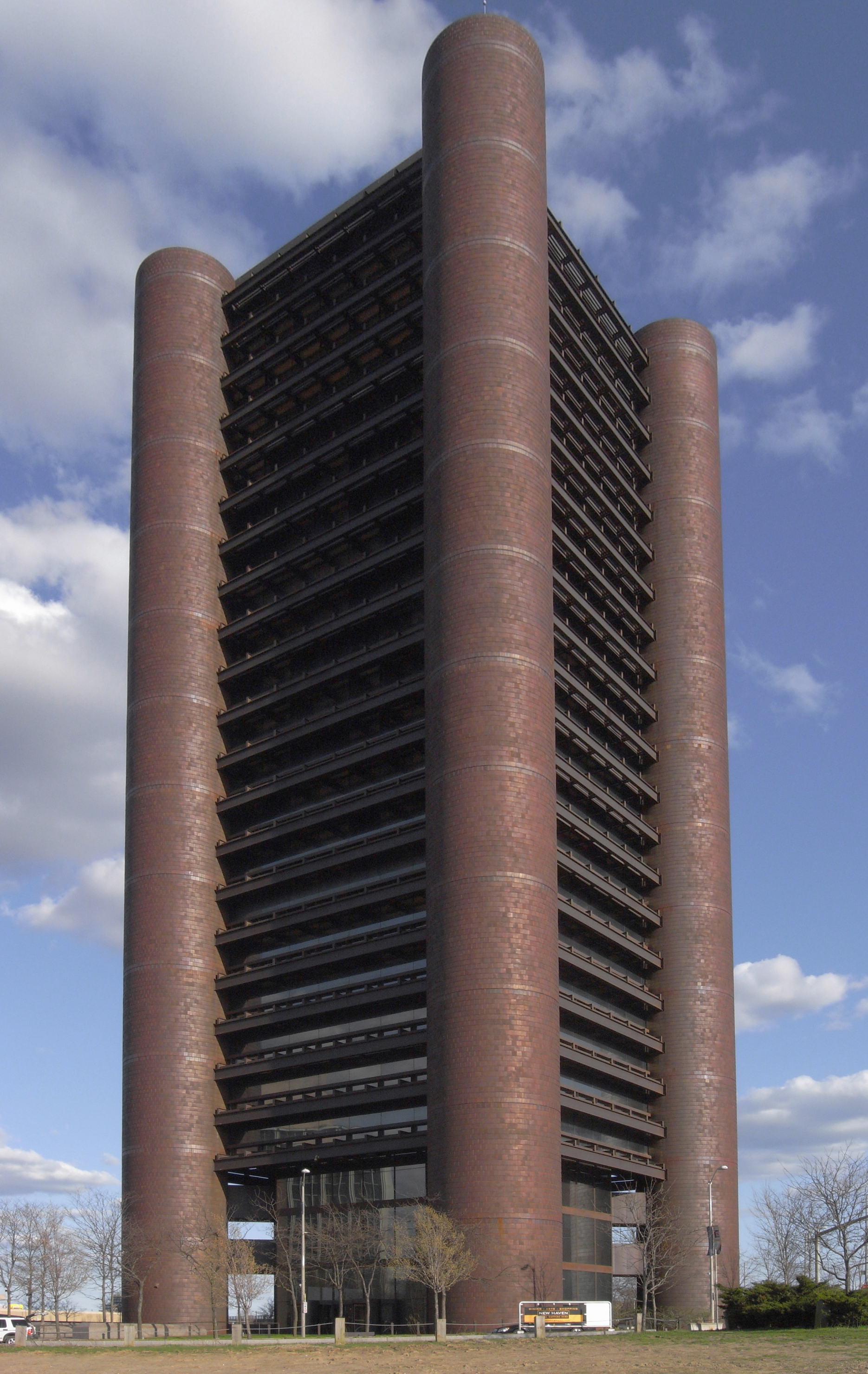
Knights of Columbus headquarters

As the Order and its charitable works grew, so did its prominence within the Church. Pope John Paul I's first audience with a layman was with Supreme Knight Virgil Dechant, and Pope John Paul II met with Supreme Knight Dechant three days after his installation. During the pope's 1979 visit to the United States, the Supreme Officers and Board were the only lay organization to receive an audience. Pope Leo XIV met in person with Supreme Knight Patrick E. Kelly at the Vatican in October 2025, and delivered an address to the organization's 2025 annual gathering.

Richard Nixon addressed the Supreme Convention in 1971. Ronald Reagan spoke in 1982 and 1986 and George W. Bush spoke in 2004. George H. W. Bush spoke as US vice president in 1984 and then again as president in 1992. Bill Clinton sent a videotaped message to the 111th Supreme Convention saying the Order's "contributions to the Catholic Church and to your communities merit our applause."

Church historian Massimo Faggioli believes the scope of the Knights' philanthropy can "create influence through money, especially in important places like Rome or Washington, D.C."

== Organization and principles ==
Council	Assembly	Circle
Grand Knight	Faithful Navigator	Chief Squire
Chaplain*	Faithful Friar*	Father Prior
Deputy Grand Knight	Faithful Captain	Deputy Chief Squire
Chancellor	Faithful Admiral***	Marshal Squire
Recorder	Faithful Scribe	Notary Squire
Financial Secretary**	Faithful Comptroller	Bursar Squire
Treasurer	Faithful Purser	Bursar Squire
Lecturer*	nonexistent	nonexistent
Advocate	nonexistent	nonexistent
Warden	Faithful Pilot	Marshal Squire
Inside Guard	Inner Sentinel	Sentry
Outside Guard	Outer Sentinel	Sentry
Trustee (3 Year)	Trustee (3 Year)	nonexistent
Trustee (2 Year)	Trustee (2 Year)	nonexistent
Trustee (1 Year)	Trustee (1 Year)	nonexistent
nonexistent	Color Corp Commander*	nonexistent
* Appointed annually by each council's Grand Knight or Faithful Navigator; ** Appointed for a three-year term by the Supreme Knight; *** Appointed by the Past Faithful Navigators of the Assembly and Faithful Navigator

The order is dedicated to the principles of charity, unity, fraternity, and patriotism. Membership is restricted to men, at least 18 years of age, who are practicing Catholics in union with the Holy See and are in good standing with the Church. As of October 2026, there were over 2.2 million Knights of Columbus worldwide, with the majority in North America.

After his induction and completion of the Exemplification of Charity, a new member becomes a First Degree Knight. He then progresses through the Second and Third Degrees after completing the subsequent Exemplifications of Unity and Fraternity. A Third Degree Knight is considered to have attained full "Knighthood" status. Privileges of Third Degree membership include the ability to serve as a local council officer, and admission to state and Supreme Council business meetings.

A Third Degree Knight in good standing is eligible to complete the Exemplification of Patriotism and progress to the Fourth Degree. This is an optional degree, but represents the highest ideals of the order. A Knight who has attained this level is addressed as "Sir Knight".

Each member belongs to one of more than 17,000 local councils around the world. Most are based in Catholic parishes, though some have their own council hall within a community. Each local council works to assist with the needs of its community consistent with the principles of the order.

Year	Membership	Councils
2026	2,200,000+ (Note: The 105,000 new members was the largest single year total in more than 100 years.)	
2024	2,100,000+	17,000+
2023	2,000,000+	
1982	1,300,000	<7,000
1964	1,000,000+	
1957	1,000,000	
1938	500,000	
1931		2,600
1923	774,189	2,290
1917	400,000	
1914	300,000+	
1909	230,000	1300
1899	40,267	300
1897	16,651	195
1892	6,500	
1886	2,700	27
1884	459	5

The college councils program, started at Catholic University of America in 1898, was created to promote the moral, intellectual and spiritual development of college men on campuses throughout the world. The oldest continuously running college council is the University of Notre Dame Council #1477, chartered in 1910. Councils at seminaries ("seminarian councils") are classified as college councils. As of 2026, there are more than 37,000 knights at 320 college councils worldwide.

Throughout most of its history, the Knights of Columbus has provided active support to members of the armed forces and their families. As of 2024, there are more than 50 military councils in military bases throughout North America and around the world.

A Knight who has attained the Fourth Degree also belongs to a Fourth Degree assembly. Fourth Degree Knights are men who have chosen to embrace the order's fourth principle of patriotism. Fourth Degree assemblies get their members from multiple councils within a local geographical area. They lead the efforts to reach out to veterans and active military and to embody the fact that one can be a faithful Catholic and also be a faithful citizen. As of 2024, there are more than 3,600 Fourth Degree assemblies worldwide. The 125th anniversary of the Fourth Degree was celebrated in February 2025, presided over by Cardinal Timothy Dolan.

Fourth Degree assemblies may form Color Corps, an elective division of the Fourth Degree, whose distinctive presence in parades, wreath-laying ceremonies, Confirmations and other Catholic functions are a visible reminder of the Knights' service to their communities. Fourth Degree Color Corps are often the most visible arm of the Knights.

The Supreme Council is the governing body of the order. It elects insurance members to serve three-year terms on a 24-member Board of Directors. Leaders' salaries are set by the board of directors and ratified by the delegates to the Supreme Convention. The seven-figure salaries of senior KOC officers have been criticized as excessive.

In 1969, the Knights opened a 23-story headquarters building in New Haven.

== Charitable giving ==
Supreme Knight Patrick Kelly addressing the 144th Convention of the Knights of Columbus in Denver, CO on August 4, 2026

Charity is the foremost important principle of the Knights of Columbus. In his 2026 annual report, Supreme Knight Patrick Kelly said that the organization had donated more than $200 million and 48 million volunteer-hours toward charity projects in 2025. Charitable activities include support for refugees, aid for victims of natural disasters, and advocating Catholic ethics, such as opposition to same-sex marriage and opposition to abortion.

Beginning in 1897, the National Council encouraged local councils to establish funds to support members affected by the 1890s depression. Councils also offered employment agency services and provided aid to the poor and sick. Aid has also been dispensed to assist victims of natural and man-made disasters, starting with a flood in Kansas in 1903. In 2015 alone, the order donated hundreds of thousands of US dollars to victims of typhoons and other natural disasters.

During times of war, the Order supports aid to refugees. Between 2014 and 2018, the Knights gave more than $2 million to provide food, shelter, clothing, and medical care to persecuted Christians and other religious minorities in the Middle East. The Knights donated $250,000 in 2018 to help refugees crossing over the Mexico–United States border who were seeking asylum in the United States and later expanded the program. Within days of the 2022 Russian invasion of Ukraine, the 2,000 Knights of Columbus in the country worked to help those impacted. They began by providing food and clothing to those at train and bus stations in Lviv who were fleeing into Poland. They then began organizing busses to take people to the Polish border. In the first three months of the war, the Knights in Poland helped more than 300,000 people, or 10% of those who fled to that country. Since the start of the war, the Knights of Columbus have delivered more than 8.5 million pounds of relief supplies and provided more than $17 million for humanitarian relief in Ukraine.

The Knights of Columbus has donated more than $600 million to those with intellectual and physical disabilities. One of the largest recipients of aid in this area has been the Special Olympics, where the Knights have been involved since the first games in 1968. In 2023, the Knights donated more than $4 million to Special Olympics and helped organize and run nearly 4,000 competitions.

After the Knights had donated more than 1,000 ultrasound machines to crisis pregnancy centers from 2009 to 2019, Anderson said, "Our ultrasound initiative is now the greatest humanitarian achievement in the history of the Knights of Columbus. ... We can, and I am confident that we will, save millions of unborn lives." Following the United States Supreme Court decision in Dobbs v. Jackson Women's Health Organization, Supreme Knight Patrick E. Kelly called on the order to increase their support for women facing unplanned and crisis pregnancies with the Aid and Support After Pregnancy (ASAP) initiative. As of 2026, about 2,100 ultrasound machines had been installed through the program.

The Global Wheelchair Mission is an alliance of independent international organizations working to deliver wheelchairs and mobility assistance to people worldwide. In 2023, the Knights provided more than 11,000 wheelchairs to the Global Wheelchair Mission.

The Knights also donate to the institutional church, including being a major donor to the United States Conference of Catholic Bishops and the Canadian Conference of Catholic Bishops. As of 2017, the Knights' Vicarius Christi fund has contributed more than $57 million to the charitable efforts of the pope. The Knights have supported the Vatican's news operation for decades.

In the field of education, the Knights of Columbus have a number of scholarships and other programs for seminarians, veterans and students at the Catholic University of America, and at other Catholic colleges. Especially during World War I and World War II, the Order operated a number of "huts" to support troops serving in combat, regardless of race or religion.

== Insurance program ==
=== Early years ===
Year	Insurance in force	Assets
1957	$690 million	$124 million
1956 (Note: The $88 million increase during 1956 was the greatest single increase in the Order's history.)	$650 million	
1955	$562 million	
1953	$420 million	
1932	$300 million	
1919	$140 million	
1897		$42,282
1896		$12,000

The original insurance system devised by McGivney gave a deceased Knight's widow a $1,000 death benefit. Each member was assessed $1 upon a death, and when the number of Knights grew beyond 1,000, the assessment decreased according to the rate of increase. Each member, regardless of age, was assessed equally. As a result, younger, healthier members could expect to pay more over the course of their lifetimes than those men who joined when they were older. There was also a Sick Benefit Deposit for members who fell ill and could not work. Each sick Knight was entitled to draw up to $5 a week for 13 weeks (roughly equivalent to $155 in 2022 dollars). If he remained sick after that, the council to which he belonged determined the sum of money given to him.

The need for a reserve fund for times of epidemic was seen from the earliest days, but it was rejected several times before finally being established in 1892. It had $12,000 in assets in 1896. By 1897, the method of funding the program changed. Each member was assessed five cents a month for 100 months, so that he would contribute $5.

Since its first loan to St. Rose Church in Meriden, Connecticut, in the late 1890s, the Knights of Columbus have made loans to parishes, dioceses, and other Catholic institutions. By 1954, over $300 million had been loaned and the program "never lost one cent of principal or interest."

In the post–World War II era, the interest rates on long-term bonds dipped below levels at which the order's insurance program could sustain itself, and Supreme Knight Hart moved the order into a more aggressive program of investing in real estate. Under his leadership, the order established a lease-back investment program in which the order would buy a piece of property and then lease it back to the original owner "upon terms generally that would bring to our Order a net rental equal to the normal mortgage interest rate." Between 1952 and 1962, 18 pieces of land were purchased for a total of $29 million. Late in 1953 the order purchased the land beneath Yankee Stadium for $2.5 million. In 1971, the City of New York took the land by eminent domain.

Between 1952 and 1962, 18 pieces of land were purchased as part of the lease-back program for a total of $29 million. During this time, the amount of money invested in common stock also increased.

=== Modern program ===
Year	Insurance in force (billions)	Assets (billions)
2025	$124	
2024	$123	
2023	$121	
2021	$114	$26
2020	$110+	$20+
2019	$109+	$26+
2018	$109	$26
2017	$109	
2015	$99	
2014	$100	$24
2013	$90	$19.8
2012	$88.4	$19.4
2011	$83.5	$18.0
2010	$79.0	$16.9
2009	$74.3	$15.5
2008	$70.0	$14
2007	$66.0	$13
2006	$61.9	$12.2
2005	$57.7	
2004	$53.3	
2003	$49.1	
2002	$45.6	
2001	$42.9	
2000	$40.4	
1999	$38	
1997	$30	
1992	$20	
1990	$14	$3.6
1981	$6.4	$1
1976	$3.6	$656 million
1975	$3	
1971	$2	
1964	$1+	
1960	$1	

The order offers a professional insurance operation with more than $124 billion of life insurance policies in force as of August 2026. This places the Order on the Fortune 1000 list and it is large enough to rank 49th on the A. M. Best list of all life insurance companies in North America.

Products include permanent and term life insurance, as well as annuities, long term care insurance, and disability insurance. The insurance program is not a separate business offered by the order to others, but is exclusively for the benefit of members and their families. All agents are members of the order.

The order's insurance program is the most highly rated program in North America. For more than 40 consecutive years, the order has received A. M. Best's highest rating, A++. (Note: Standard & Poor's downgraded the insurance program's financial strength/credit rating from AAA to AA+ in August 2011 not due to the order's financial strength, but due to its lowering of the long-term sovereign credit rating of the United States to AA+. Other US insurance groups also downgraded by S&P from AAA to AA+ were New York Life, Northwestern Mutual, TIAA, and USAA as, like the Knights of Columbus, their assets are highly concentrated in the US and they have significant holdings in US Treasury and agency securities.) Forbes publishes an annual list of what it refers to as "America's Best Insurance Companies", and it has included the Knights of Columbus insurance program on this list since 2022.

The order maintains a two-prong investment strategy: a company must first be a sound investment before stock in it is purchased, and secondly the company's activities must not conflict with Catholic social teaching. The guidelines include protecting human life, promoting human dignity, reducing arms production, pursuing economic justice, protecting the environment, and encouraging corporate responsibility. (Note: The full guidelines are published on the episcopal conference's website.) As of 2017, it had been named a "World's Most Ethical Company" by Ethisphere Institute for five consecutive years. Citing the awards they have won, the order calls themselves "champions of ethical investing".

In 2017, over $965 million was awarded in benefits. Since the founding of the order, $3.5 billion in death benefits have been paid. Additionally, the insurance program has a low 3.5 percent lapse rate of the 1.9 million members and their families who are insured.

Its insurance operation invests in loans to various churches, schools, and other Catholic institutions. As of 2008, over $500 million had been loaned through the ChurchLoan program. At the outset of the COVID-19 pandemic, the Order established a $100 million fund to provide short-term loans to help dioceses weather the economic storm. Each diocese was eligible to obtain a $1 million secured line of credit.

== Promotion of the Catholic faith ==
=== Efforts against religious discrimination ===
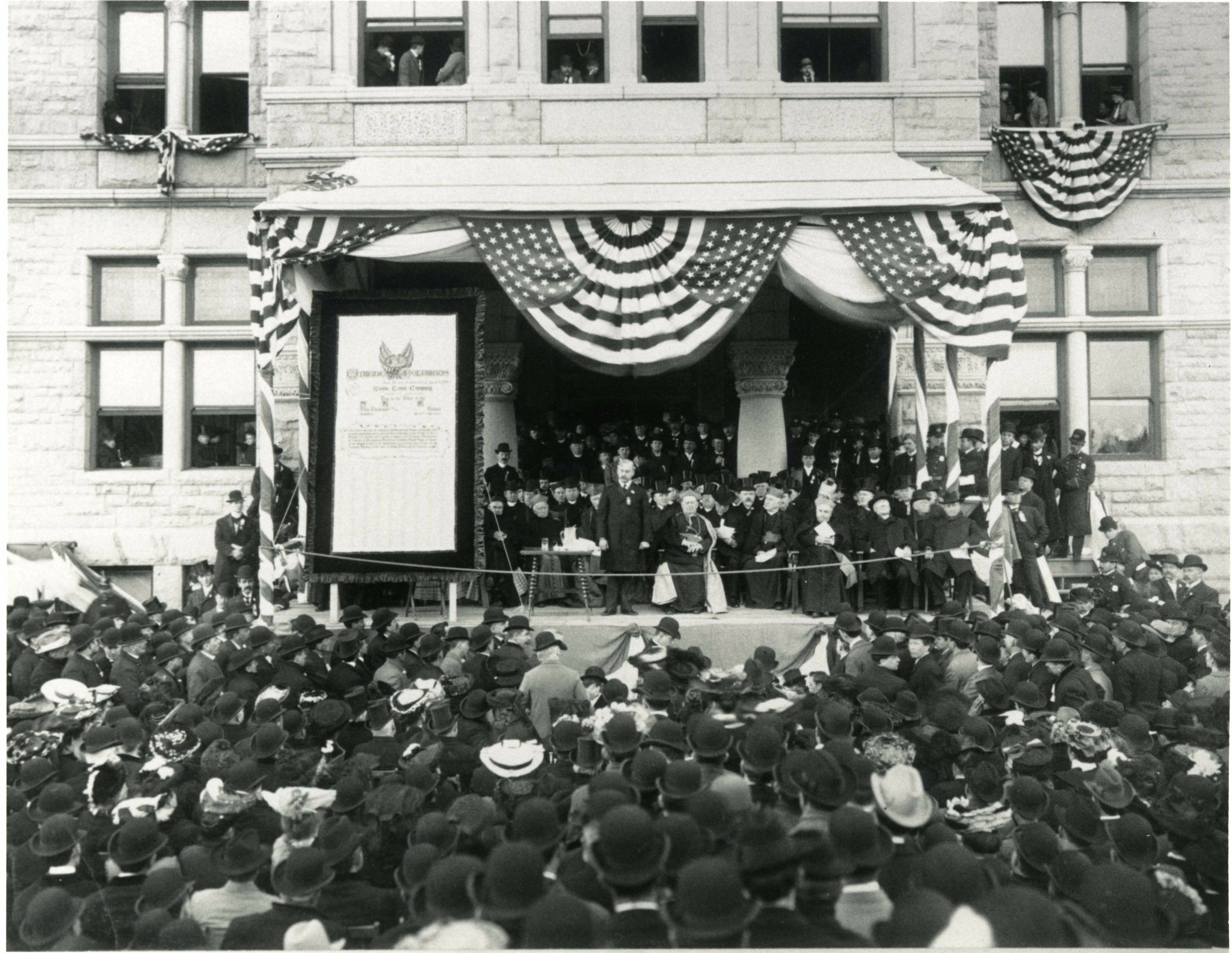
The Knights of Columbus presented a check to Catholic University of America on the steps of the university's McMahon Hall in 1904 to establish a Chair of American History.

Since its earliest days, the Knights of Columbus has been a "Catholic anti-defamation society". In 1914, it established a Commission on Religious Prejudices. As part of the effort, the order distributed pamphlets, and lecturers toured the country speaking on how Catholics could love and be loyal to America.

The creation of the 4th Degree, with its emphasis on patriotism, performed an anti-defamation function as well as asserting claims to Americanism. In response to a defamatory "bogus oath" circulated by the KKK, in 1914 the Knights set up a framework for a lecture series and educational programs to combat anti-Catholic sentiment.

=== New evangelization ===
The Knights have been urged to take a prominent role in the new evangelization. The CIS published a series on the new evangelization in 2011, and donations to other Catholic mass communication services represent one of the Knights' major expenditures. The Knights have also established councils in both secular and Catholic universities.

== Awards ==
The order sponsors a number of international awards. The first, the Gaudium et Spes Award, is named after the document from the Second Vatican Council, and is the highest honor bestowed by the order. It "is awarded only in special circumstances and only to individuals of exceptional merit" and comes with an honorarium of $100,000. In the first 25 years after its institution in 1992, it was only awarded twelve times. The award "recognizes individuals for their exemplary contributions to the realization of the message of faith and service in the spirit of Christ as articulated in the document for which it is named".

Gaudium et Spes Award
Year	Awardee
2023	Mother Agnes Mary Donovan
2016	Little Sisters of the Poor
2015	Cardinal Francis George
2005	Jean Vanier
2002	Archbishop Michael Sabbah
2001	Cardinal William Baum
2000	Cardinal James Hickey
1994	Cardinal John O'Connor
1992	Mother Teresa

The second international award, also only given when merited, is the Caritas Award. Named for the theological virtue alternatively translated as either charity or love, it recognizes "extraordinary works of charity and service" and was established in 2013. It was first awarded jointly to St. Virgilius Knights of Columbus Council 185 in Newtown, Connecticut and Monsignor Robert Weiss, pastor of St Rose of Lima in Newtown, Connecticut. Both received the honor, and the $100,000 honorarium was given to St. Rose of Lima parish, for their actions following the Sandy Hook Elementary School shooting.

The Saint Michael Award was established in conjunction with the Caritas Award to recognize members of the order who have exemplified a lifetime of service on behalf of the Knights of Columbus. Additionally, at its annual convention each year, the order recognizes other individuals and councils with awards. These include the Family of the Year award, and prizes for the best activities in the categories of church, community, council, culture of life, family, and youth. Additionally, top selling general and field insurance agents are recognized, as are top recruiting individuals and councils.

The order established the Grand Cross of the Knights of Columbus, but awarded it only to Cristobal Colón y de La Cerda, Duke of Veragua and descendant of Columbus, when he visited the US in 1893.

== Political activity ==
While the Knights were politically active from an early date, in the years following the Second Vatican Council, as the "Catholic anti-defamation character" of the order began to diminish as Catholics gained more acceptance, the leadership began to use its financial resources to directly influence the direction of the church. That led to the creation of a "variety of new programs reflecting the proliferation of the new social ministries of the church."

At times, the leadership of the order has been both liberal and conservative. Martin H. Carmody and Luke E. Hart were both political conservatives, but John J. Phelan was a Democratic politician prior to becoming Supreme Knight, John Swift's "strong support for economic democracy and social-welfare legislation marks him as a fairly representative New Deal anti-communist," and Francis P. Matthews was a civil rights official and member of Harry Truman's cabinet. Anderson previously served in the Office of Public Liaison under Ronald Reagan.

The Knights of Columbus is classified as a 501(c)(8) fraternal benefit society by the IRS. Unlike the more common 501(c)(3) nonprofits, 501(c)(8)s are allowed to engage in limited direct political activity without jeopardizing their tax exemptions. However, Anderson has said "One of our most important traditions throughout our 125-year history is that we do not, as an organization, become involved in partisan politics."

The Knights of Columbus supports political awareness and activity among its members and local councils. Public policy activity is limited to issue-specific campaigns, typically dealing with Catholic family and sanctity of life issues. They state that

In addition to performing charitable works, the Knights of Columbus encourages its members to meet their responsibilities as Catholic citizens and to become active in the political life of their local communities, to vote and to speak out on the public issues of the day. ... In the political realm, this means opening our public policy efforts and deliberations to the life of Christ and the teachings of the Church. In accord with our Bishops, the Knights of Columbus has consistently maintained positions that take these concerns into account. The order supports and promotes the social doctrine of the Church, including a robust vision of religious liberty that embraces religion's proper role in the private and public spheres.

The order opposed the persecution of Catholics in Mexico during the Cristero War, and opposed communism. During the 20th century, the order also established the Commission on Religious Prejudices and the Knights of Columbus Historical Commission, organizations which fought against racism. It was also supportive of trade unionism, and published the works "of the broad array of intellectuals", including George Schuster, Samuel Flagg Bemis, Allan Nevins, and W. E. B. DuBois.

During the Cold War, the order had a history of waging anti-socialist, anti-communist and anti-anarchist crusades. They lobbied for the addition of the words "under God" to the Pledge of Allegiance, as a religious response to Soviet atheism. The Knights have actively opposed the legalization of same-sex marriage and in terms of funding, they have also been a key contributor to local measures against same-sex marriage. The Knights have donated over US$1 million to the Susan B. Anthony Foundation and other anti-abortion and anti-contraception organizations.

== Subsidiaries ==
=== Museum ===
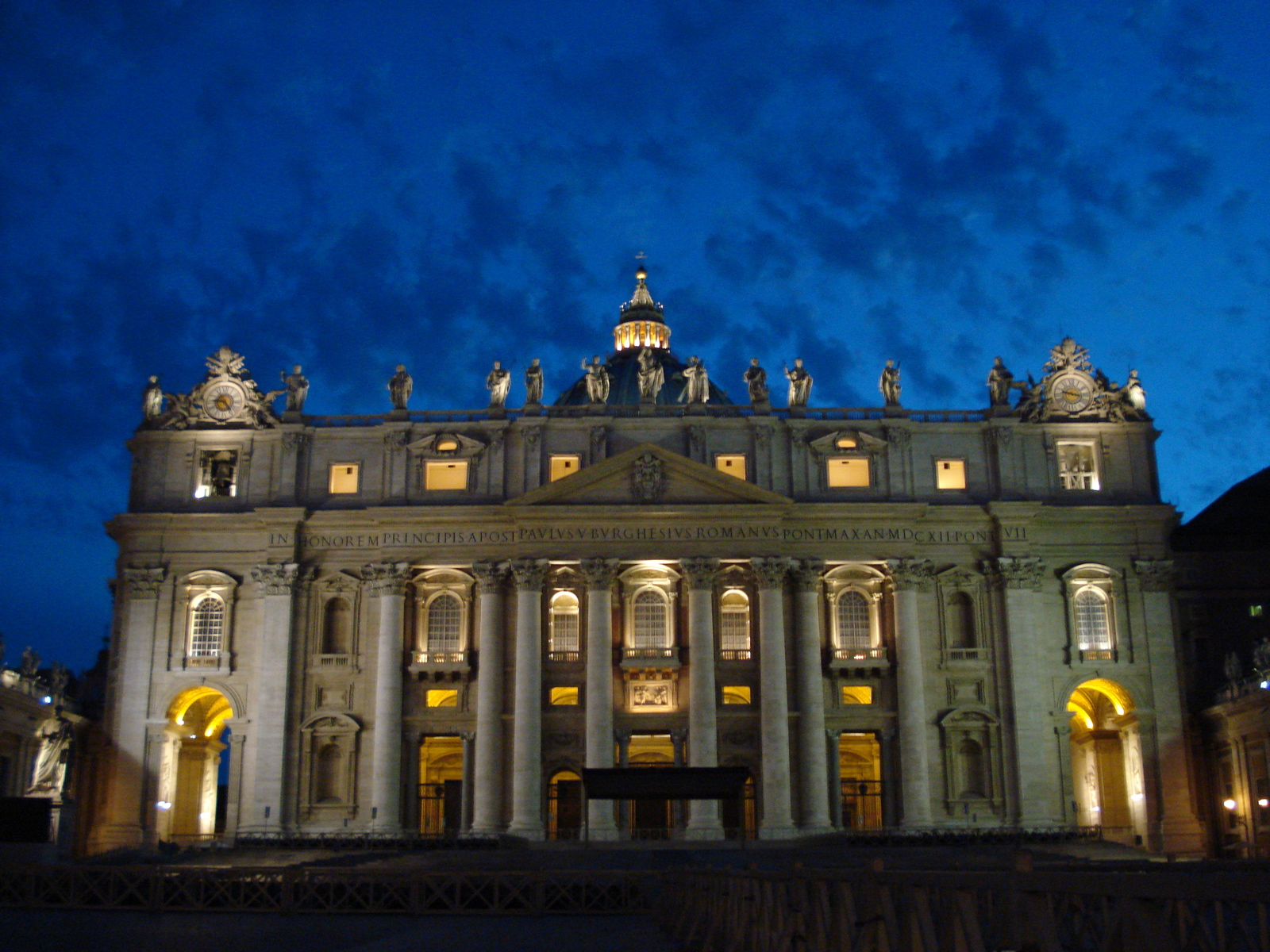
The cross from the façade of St. Peter's Basilica now resides in the Knights' museum.

On March 10, 2001, the order opened a museum in New Haven dedicated to their history. The 77,000 square foot building cost US$10 million to renovate. It holds mosaics on loan from the Vatican and gifts from Popes, the membership application from John F. Kennedy, and a number of other items related to the history of the Knights. Near the entrance is the cross held by Jesus Christ on the facade of St. Peter's Basilica before undergoing a Knights-financed renovation.

=== Knights of Columbus Asset Advisors ===
In 2015, the order launched Knights of Columbus Asset Advisors, a money management firm which invests money in accordance with Catholic social teaching. As of September 2026, the firm had $29 billion in assets under management.

The firm uses the Socially Responsible Investment Guidelines published by the United States Conference of Catholic Bishops to guide their investment decisions. The guidelines include protecting human life, promoting human dignity, reducing arms production, pursuing economic justice, protecting the environment, and encouraging corporate responsibility. (Note: The full guidelines are published on the episcopal conference's website.)

In addition to the wholly owned subsidiary, it also purchased 20% of Boston Advisors, a boutique investment management firm, managing assets for institutional and high-net-worth investors. Knights of Columbus Asset Advisors manages the fixed-income strategies for their funds while Boston Advisors sub-advises on the equity strategies. Knights of Columbus Asset Advisors also offers model portfolio, outsourced CIO services, a bank loan strategy, and other alternative investment strategies. In 2019, the Knights purchased the institutional management business of Boston Advisors.

=== Saint John Paul II National Shrine ===
The order owns and operates the Saint John Paul II National Shrine in Washington D.C. In 2011, the Order purchased the 130,000-square-foot John Paul II Cultural Center. The mission as a cultural center ended in 2009 and the Knights rebranded it as a shrine to Pope John Paul II. Soon after the pope was canonized, the United States Conference of Catholic Bishops named the building a national shrine.

Each year 64,000 pilgrims visit the shrine, which features video content, interactive displays, and personal effects from John Paul. There is also a first class relic of the pope's blood on display for veneration. It also serves as a base for the Order in Washington, D.C.

== Notable Knights ==
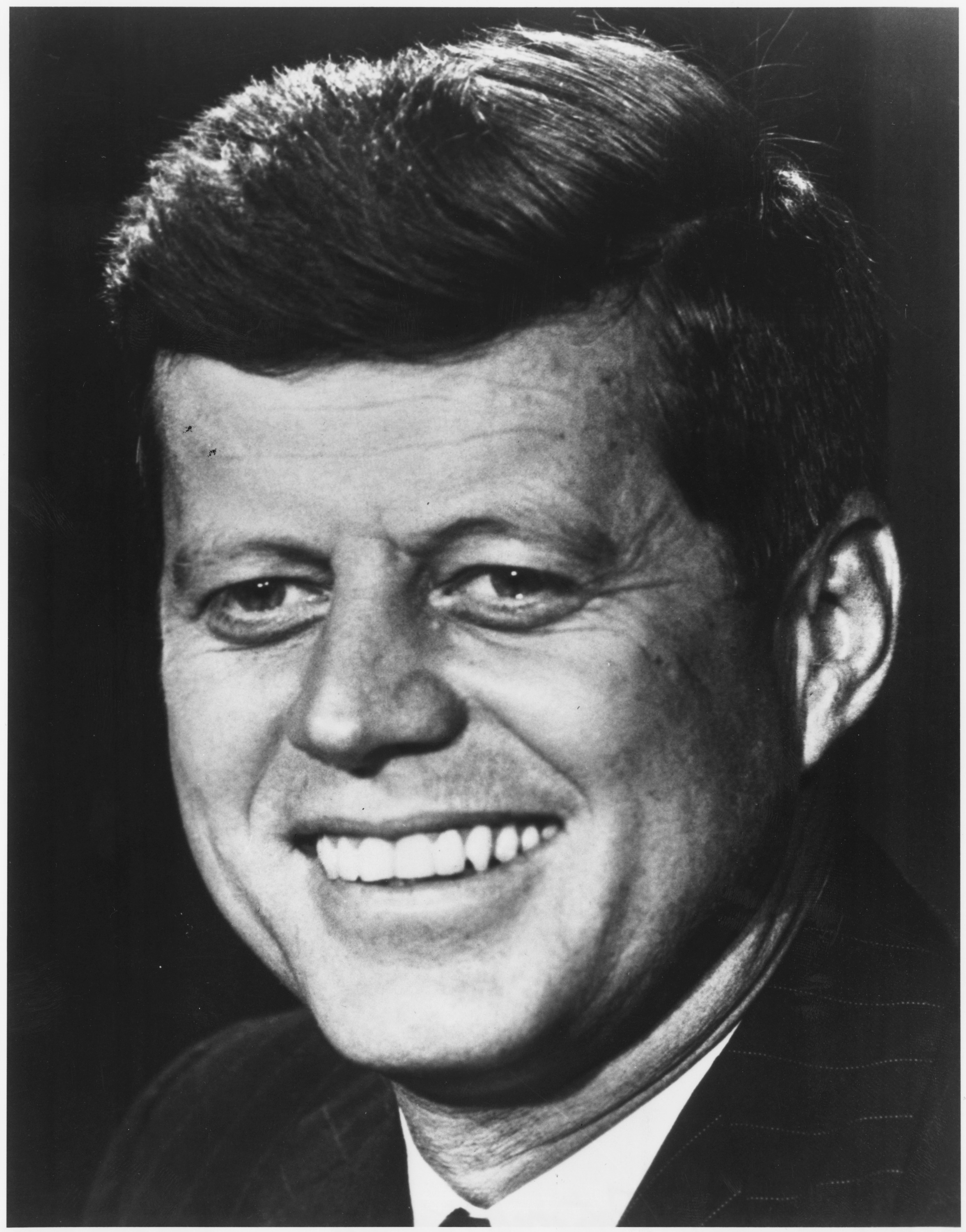
President John F. Kennedy was a Fourth Degree Knight and a member of Bunker Hill Council No. 62.

Some of the most notable American members include John F. Kennedy; Ted Kennedy; Al Smith; Sargent Shriver; Samuel Alito; Conrad Hilton; John Boehner; Ray Flynn; Jeb Bush; film maker John Ford; and Sergeant Major Daniel Daly, a two-time Medal of Honor recipient.

In the world of sports, Vince Lombardi, the famed former coach of the Green Bay Packers; James Connolly, the first Olympic gold medal champion in modern times; Floyd Patterson, former heavyweight boxing champion; and baseball legend Babe Ruth were all knights.

On October 15, 2006, Bishop Rafael Guízar y Valencia (1878–1938) was canonized by Pope Benedict XVI in Rome. In 2000, six other Knights, who were killed in the violence following the Mexican Revolution, were declared saints by Pope John Paul II.

== Emblem of the order ==
The emblem of the order was designed by Past Supreme Knight James T. Mullen and adopted at the second Supreme Council meeting on May 12, 1883. Shields used by medieval knights served as the inspiration. The emblem consists of a shield mounted on a Formée cross, which is an artistic representation of the cross of Christ. This represents the Catholic identity of the order.

The KOC Emblem of the Order

Mounted on the shield are three objects: the fasces, an anchor, and a sword. In ancient Rome, the fasces was carried before magistrates as an emblem of authority. The order uses it as "symbolic of authority which must exist in any tightly bonded and efficiently operating organization." The anchor represents Christopher Columbus, admiral under the orders of the kings of Spain and patron of this partnership, here a symbol of the Catholic contribution to America. The short sword, or dagger, was a weapon used by medieval knights. The shield as a whole, with the letters "KOC", represents "Catholic Knighthood in organized merciful action."

=== Triad Emblem of the Fourth Degree ===
Fourth Degree assemblies are separate from councils. They have their own officers and a separate emblem. This optional, patriotic degree was instituted in 1900.

Triad Emblem of the Fourth Degree

The Triad Emblem of the Fourth Degree features a white dove, a red cross and a blue globe. The dove – a classic symbol of the Holy Spirit and of peace – is shown hovering over the globe. Both are mounted on a variation of the Crusaders' cross, the cross worn on the tunics and capes of knights of the Middle Ages. These three items are also representative of the Blessed Trinity:

- The globe represents God the Father, Creator of the Universe.
- The cross represents God the Son, Redeemer of Mankind.
- The dove represents the Holy Spirit, Sanctifier of Humanity.

The red, white and blue colors on the emblem are those of the flag of the United States, where the Knights of Columbus originated. They also help to underscore the value of patriotism that is the foundational principle of the Fourth Degree.

== Auxiliary groups ==
=== Women's auxiliaries ===
Many councils also have women's auxiliaries. At the turn of the 20th century, two were formed by local councils, each taking the name Daughters of Isabella. They expanded and issued charters to other circles but never merged. The newer organization renamed itself the Catholic Daughters of the Americas in 1921, and both have structures independent of the Knights of Columbus. Other groups are known as the Columbiettes. In the Philippines, the ladies' auxiliary is known as the Daughters of Mary Immaculate.

A proposal in 1896 to establish councils for women did not pass and was never proposed again.

=== Columbian Squires ===
The Knights' official junior organization is the Columbian Squires. According to its founder Barnabas McDonald, "The supreme purpose of the Columbian Squires is character building."

It was founded in 1925 in Duluth, Minnesota, by Barnabas McDonald. The formation of new Squire Circles in the United States and Canada is discouraged, as the Order desires to move youth activities from exclusive clubs into the local parish youth groups.

== Similar Christian organizations ==
The Knights of Columbus is a member of the International Alliance of Catholic Knights (IACK), which includes fifteen fraternal orders such as the Knights of Saint Columbanus in Ireland, the Knights of St Columba in Great Britain, the Knights of Peter Claver in the United States, the Knights of the Southern Cross in Australia and New Zealand, the Knights of Marshall in Ghana, the Knights of Da Gama in South Africa, and the Knights of Saint Mulumba in Nigeria.

== See also ==
- Columbus Fountain
- Columbus School of Law
- Father Millet Cross
- James Cardinal Gibbons Memorial Statue
- Knights of Columbus Hostel fire
- List of Knights of Columbus buildings
- List of Massachusetts State Deputies of the Knights of Columbus
- Manuscripta
- Parish Priest (book)
- Pope John Paul II Cultural Center

== Works cited ==
- Alley, Robert S., ed. (1999). The Constitution & Religion: Leading Supreme Court Cases on Church and State. Amherst, New York: Prometheus Books. ISBN 978-1-57392-703-1.
- Brinkley, Douglas; Fenster, Julie M. (2006). Parish Priest: Father Michael McGivney and American Catholicism. New York: William Morrow. ISBN 978-0-06-077684-8.
- Dodge, William Wallace (1903). The Fraternal and Modern Banquet Orator: An Original Book of Useful Helps at the Social Session and Assembly of Fraternal Orders, College Entertainments, Social Gatherings and All Banquet Occasions. Chicago: Monarch Book Company.
- Dumenil, Lynn (Fall 1991). "The tribal Twenties: "Assimilated" Catholics' response to Anti-Catholicism in the 1920s". Journal of American Ethnic History. 11 (1): 21–49. JSTOR 27500903.
- Egan, Maurice Francis; Kennedy, John James Bright (1920). The Knights of Columbus in Peace and War. Vol. 1. BiblioBazaar. ISBN 978-1-142-78398-3.
- Flanagan, Luke (2017). "Knights of Columbus Catholic Recreation Clubs in Great Britain, 1917–1919". In Malet, David; Anderson, Miriam J. (eds.). Transnational Actors in War and Peace: Militants, Activists, and Corporations in World Politics. Georgetown University Press. pp. 24–41. ISBN 978-1-62616-443-7.
- Fry, Henry P. (1922). The Modern Ku Klux Klan. Boston: Small, Maynard & Company.
- Hearn, Edward (1913). "Knights of Columbus" . In Herbermann, Charles G.; Pace, Edward A.; Pallen, Condé B.; Shahan, Thomas J.; Wynne, John J. (eds.). Catholic Encyclopedia. Vol. 8. New York: Encyclopedia Press. pp. 670–671.
- Hubbard, Robert; Hubbard, Kathleen (2019). Hidden History of New Haven. Arcadia Publishing. ISBN 978-1-4671-4082-9.
- Kauffman, Christopher J. (1982). Faith and Fraternalism: The History of the Knights of Columbus, 1882–1982. Harper and Row. ISBN 978-0-06-014940-6.
- ——— (2013). "Knights of Columbus". In Venzon, Anne Cipriano; Miles, Paul L. (eds.). The United States in the First World War: An Encyclopedia. New York: Garland Publishing. pp. 321–322. ISBN 978-1-135-68453-2.
- ——— (2001). Patriotism and Fraternalism in the Knights of Columbus. New York: Crossroad Publishing Company. ISBN 978-0-8245-1885-1.
- Kaufmann, Eric P. (2007). The Orange Order: A Contemporary Northern Irish History. Oxford: Oxford University Press. ISBN 978-0-19-920848-7.
- Koehlinger, A. (December 1, 2004). ""Let Us Live for Those Who Love Us": Faith, Family, and the Contours of Manhood among the Knights of Columbus in Late Nineteenth-Century Connecticut". Journal of Social History. 38 (2): 455–469. doi:10.1353/jsh.2004.0126. S2CID 144647069.
- Lapomarda, Vincent A. (1992). The Knights of Columbus in Massachusetts (second ed.). Norwood, Massachusetts: Knights of Columbus Massachusetts State Council.
- Marchildon, Gregory P. (2009). "Introduction". In Marchildon, Gregory P. (ed.). Immigration and Settlement, 1870–1939. History of the Prairie West. Vol. 2. Regina, Saskatchewan: University of Regina Press. pp. 1–9. ISBN 978-0-88977-230-4.
- McGowan, Mark G. (1999). Waning of the Green: Catholics, the Irish, and Identity in Toronto, 1887-1922. McGill–Queen's Press—MQUP. ISBN 978-0-7735-1789-9.
- Mecklin, John (2013) [1924]. The Ku Klux Klan: A Study of the American Mind. Read Books. ISBN 978-1-4733-8675-4.
- Nuesse, C. Joseph (1990). The Catholic University of America: A Centennial History. Washington: Catholic University of America Press. ISBN 978-0-8132-0736-0.
- Salvaterra, David L. (2002). "Review of Patriotism and Fraternalism in the Knights of Columbus: A History of the Fourth Degree by Christopher J. Kauffman". The Catholic Historical Review. 88 (1): 157–158. doi:10.1353/cat.2002.0048. ISSN 1534-0708. JSTOR 25026129. S2CID 162342037.
- Singular, Stephen (2005). By Their Works: Profiles of Men of Faith Who Made a Difference. New York: HarperCollins. ISBN 978-0-06-116145-2.
- Skocpol, Theda; Ganz, Marshall; Munson, Ziad (2000). "A Nation of Organizers: The Institutional Origins of Civic Voluntarism in the United States". The American Political Science Review. 94 (3): 527–546. doi:10.2307/2585829. JSTOR 2585829. S2CID 145598414. Archived from the original on February 4, 2023.
- Sullivan, Neil (2001). The Diamond in the Bronx: Yankee Stadium and the Politics of New York. New York: Oxford University Press. ISBN 978-0-19-535253-5.
- Sweany, Mark J. (1923). Educational Work of the Knights of Columbus. Bureau of Education Bulletin. Vol. 22. Mark J. Sweaney, Director of the Knights of Columbus Educational Activities. Washington: Government Printing Office. hdl:2346/60378.
- Walther, Andrew; Walther, Maureen (2020). The Knights of Columbus: An Illustrated History. Square One Publishers. ISBN 978-0-7570-0308-0.
