= Parish Priest (book) =

Biography of Michael J. McGivney

Parish Priest: Father Michael McGivney and American Catholicism
- The cover of Parish Priest
- Author: Douglas Brinkley and Julie M. Fenster
- Language: English
- Genre: Biography
- Set in: 19th century United States
- Publisher: William Morrow and Company
- Publication date: 2006
- Publication place: United States
- Pages: 240
- ISBN: 9780060776848
- Dewey Decimal: 282.092
- LC Class: BX4705.M194
- Website: Publisher's web page

Parish Priest: Father Michael McGivney and American Catholicism is a biography of Father Michael J. McGivney, founder of the Knights of Columbus. The book was authored by Douglas Brinkley and Julie M. Fenster and was published by William Morrow and Company in 2006.
