= Lincoln Hall =

Lincoln Hall may refer to one of the following:

== People ==
- Lincoln Hall (climber) (1955 – 2012), Australian mountain climber and author

== Places ==
=== England ===
- Lincoln Hall, one of the University of Nottingham Halls of Residence in Nottingham, England.
- Lincoln Hall, a student residence at Lincoln College, Oxford in Oxford, England.
- Lincoln Hall, a student residence at Wymondham College in Norfolk, England.

=== United States ===
- Lincoln Hall, a classroom building at Danville Area Community College in Danville, Illinois.
- Lincoln Hall, a middle school in the Lincolnwood School District 74 in Lincolnwood, Illinois.
- Lincoln Hall (University of Illinois) in Urbana, Illinois, United States.
- Lincoln Hall (New York), a nonprofit educational institution in Lincolndale, New York
- Lincoln Hall, Berea College, a National Historic Landmark at Berea College, Berea, Kentucky.
- Lincoln School (Springfield, Missouri), a classroom building at Ozarks Technical Community College in Springfield, Missouri.
- Lincoln Hall, a classroom building at Cornell University College of Arts and Sciences in Ithaca, New York.
- Lincoln Hall, a student residence at Bluffton University in Bluffton, Ohio.
- Lincoln Hall, a student residence at the University of Nevada, Reno in Reno, Nevada.
- Lincoln Hall (Portland, Oregon), a former high school and current performing arts building at Portland State University in Portland, Oregon.
- Lincoln Hall Chicago, a concert hall in Chicago, Illinois.
- Lincoln Hall (Washington, D.C.), 19th century theatre in Washington D.C.
