= Squire Roses =

Catholic youth sorority

- Emblem of the Squire Roses
- Named after: Columbian Squires
- Formation: 1996
- Founder: Russel De Rose
- Type: Catholic youth fraternal organization
- Headquarters: Fairfax, Virginia
- Key people: Russ DeRose, Jason Seiler
- Parent organization: Knights of Columbus
- Affiliations: Columbian Squires
- Website: First Circle website

The Squire Roses are a youth sorority run by individual State Councils within the Knights of Columbus, for Catholic girls between the ages of 10 and 18.

== History ==
The Squire Roses were established in 1996 under the leadership of Russell De Rose for young women at St. Mary of Sorrows Church.

The process for the birth of the Squire Roses took just over four years. In March 1993, De Rose held a recruitment drive because of requests from young women to join the Columbian Squires. De Rose told the young women that the Squires and the Knights of Columbus were men's organizations and women were excluded. De Rose stated that he would set up a similar organization that would include a sorority environment as well as be similar to the Squires. The Knights of St. Mary of Sorrows provided the initial donations and were made aware that the Squire Roses would support their charities and functions but as a separate organization. All Counselors were to be practical Catholic women who met the Church requirements to work with youth and renew their certification as required.

In 1994 the same young ladies, bringing their friends and parents, continued to ask the Squires if they could join. When turned down, the ladies asked if they could assist the Squires in their projects, thus getting them involved in service to their parish and community. The young women recruited other young ladies for this young women's only organization. The Supreme Council of the Knights of Columbus stated that the Squire Rose Circles were not part of the KofC.

By 1996, the groundwork for the Squire Roses had been laid. They did not want to be "Squirerettes" or "Columbiettes" which are organizations recognized by state and international Knights of Columbus. The members of the Squire Roses defined their vision, roles, motto, emblem, laws and bylaws, and ceremonials. They continually upgrade their investiture and officer ceremonies. In 2010 they started to develop their own charter which is presented to all new Squire Roses Circles in the USA and abroad.

- In many women's investitures, a rose was given to the candidate or another special person
- The rose is a multi-cultural symbol of womanhood
- Rose thorns were what Jesus wore on his head when hung on the cross.
- Two times a year the priest wear the Rose vestments to serve mass.
- 1960 for “Operation Rose, the Squire Roses supported the St. Mary's Columbian Squires: a sterling silver rose was brought by Columbian Squires from Canada, throughout the United States by Squires, to Mexican Squires, to the Shrine of Our Lady of Guadeloupe, and given to Pope John XXIII.

The investiture presents three women which symbolizes the Squire Rose: (1) the Blessed Virgin Mary who represents Faith, (2) Knight Joan of Arc who represents Hope, and (3) Mother Teresa who represents Charity.

The first Knights of Columbus state organization to recognize the Squire Roses was Washington, D.C., and was followed by the Knights of Columbus in Virginia.

As of 2016, the formation of new Squire Circles in the United States and Canada is discouraged, since the Catholic Church has a desire to move youth activities from exclusive clubs into the local parish youth groups.

== Growth and expansion ==
1997 – Washington DC Knights of Columbus adopt the Squire Roses as their youth program for young ladies. The first Circle of Squire Roses is created on March 9 of this year.

2001 – The number of Circles grows to five, with Squire Roses numbering over 50.

2004–2005 – Circles in Washington DC fail, due to adult sponsors moving out of the area. Additionally, two Circles in Virginia fail due to lack of membership recruiting.

2006–2009 – With the introduction of Jason Seiler to run the Columbian Squires for the State of Virginia, the Squires and Squire Roses saw new growth and development. The Squires win multiple awards, including the top two international awards for growth. Likewise the Squire Roses add three new Circles, over doubling their membership in the state. Seiler is in talks with Knights of Columbus State Councils for New Jersey, California, Nebraska, and Texas to adopt the Squire Roses as their official youth group for young ladies, aged 10 to 18.

2010 – The first Squire Rose circle in Texas, Tx001, is invested and instituted at St. Francis of Assisi Catholic Community in Orange, Texas, on October 17, 2010. In addition, the first International Squire Roses Circle was invested and instituted in Luzon, Philippines.

== Organization ==
Each Circle is supervised by a Knights of Columbus Council or Assembly and has an advisory board made up of either the Grand Knight, the Deputy Grand Knight and Chaplain or the Faithful Navigator, the Faithful Captain and Faithful Friar. Circles are either Council based, Parish based, or school based, depending on the location of the Circle and the Knight counselors.

The Squire Roses officers consist of Chief Squire Rose, Deputy Chief Squire Rose, Secretary, Treasurer, and Ceremonial Guard. Adults (members of the Knights of Columbus or their affiliated Ladies Auxiliaries) fill the roles of Chief Counselor, Chancellor and the priest fills the role of the Father Prior.

== Emblem ==
The Columbian Squire Roses emblem symbolizes the ideals which identify a Squire Rose. Centered in a circle is the cross of Christ, with the letters “F,” “W,” “S,” and “C.” These symbolize Family, Wisdom, Spiritual, and Civic growth that occurs within the Squire Roses. Within the triangle are the letters “S,” representing Service, “R,” for Responsibility, “C,” for Christ, and “K,” for the Knights of Columbus, by whom the Squires Roses program is sponsored. The triangle, the most stable geometric shape, is a representation of the Holy Trinity. A red rose adorns the emblem, symbolic of womanhood and of blossoming life. The emblem is encircled with a golden ring, signifying the value and perpetuity of the group, and that all within are equal. Upon the ring is the motto of the Squire Roses – “With Grace and Dignity We Stand as One.”
