= Columbiettes =

Catholic fraternal service organization for women affiliated with the Knights of Columbus

- Logo
- Formation: March 2, 1939; 87 years ago
- Type: Catholic fraternal service
- Headquarters: 297 Willis Ave; Mineola, New York 11501 USA
- President: Veronica (Ronny) Albert (8/1/2017-7/31/2019
- Key people: J. Francis McIntyre
- Affiliations: Knights of Columbus
- Website: columbiettes.com

The Columbiettes are an international Catholic women's organization consisting of members in auxiliary councils affiliated with the Knights of Columbus.

== History ==
In 1939, Monsignor J. Francis McIntyre, Chaplain of the New York State Council of the Knights of Columbus, later a cardinal, suggested formation of the group. He conceived the idea of a ladies organization to work with the Knights. The New York State Council formulated a plan for such an organization. Their plan called for the establishment of Auxiliaries in each Council and to coordinate the efforts of all under the direction of one parent group. On March 2, 1939 the first Columbiette Auxiliary was instituted in New York City.

Since then, other auxiliaries were formed. A Supreme Council and State Councils were established.

== Purpose ==
Spiritual patronesses are the Blessed Virgin Mary, Thérèse of Lisieux and St. Joan of Arc.

A Columbiette Auxiliary must be sponsored by a Knights of Columbus Council. The primary requirements to be a member of this organization is to be a Catholic female in good standing with the Church and to be 18 years of age or older. The purpose is to aid that Knights Council in their spiritual and social activities when asked. The Columbiette Auxiliary has its own activities; spiritual, social and charitable welfare of their members, etc.

== See also ==
- Catholic Daughters of the Americas
- Daughters of Isabella
