= Barnabas McDonald =

Brother Barnabas McDonald FSC
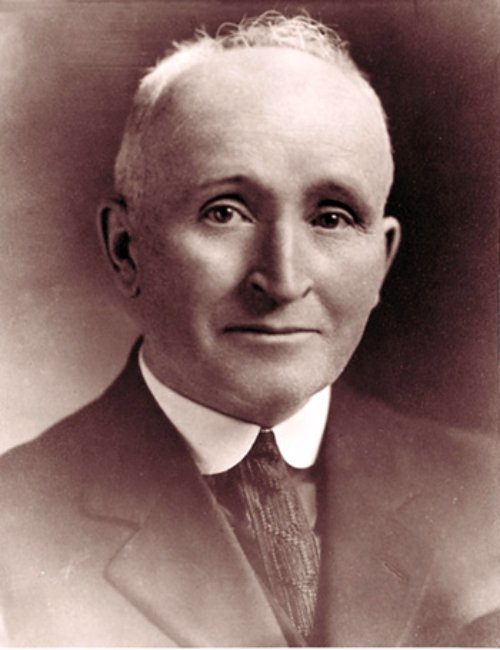
- McDonald circa 1920

Personal details
- Born: March 20, 1865 Ogdensburg, New York
- Died: April 24, 1929 (aged 64) Albuquerque, New Mexico

Brother Barnabas McDonald F.S.C. (March 20, 1865 – April 24, 1929), was a Brother of the Christian Schools involved with youth work, especially among delinquents and orphans in the United States. He is remembered as founder of the Columbian Squires of the Knights of Columbus and as a driving force in establishing the early relationship between the Boy Scouts of America and the American Catholic Church.

== Early career ==
Brother Barnabas entered the novitiate in 1885 and taught in elementary schools and at the Placing Out Bureau of the New York Catholic Protectory, which prepared boys for farm work. He opened an agricultural school and a halfway house in New York where boys leaving the Protectory could learn to live and work in society.

== Boy Scouts of America ==
Brother Barnabas was a leader during the early years of Catholic Youth ministry. Together with Victor F. Ridder and with the cooperation of James E. West, he is credited with founding one of the earliest Catholic Boy Scout troops at St. Patrick's Cathedral in 1912, having received formal approval of John Murphy Farley, Cardinal Archbishop of New York.

Brother Barnabas and Victor Ridder organized a Catholic Committee on Scouting in 1924 under the honorary chairmanship of Patrick Hayes, Cardinal Archbishop of New York. Bishop Joseph H. Conroy of Ogdensburg was named chairman of this Committee. Reverend Matthew J. Walsh, president of Notre Dame University was selected as national Chaplain.

Brother Barnabas was selected by the Boy Scouts of America in 1925 to be the Education Director of their "Catholic Bureau" for Scout extension under Catholic leadership, replacing Fr. John F. White. who had served in that capacity since 1919. In 1927 Brother Barnabas was recognized with the Silver Buffalo Award for his service.

Brother Barnabas remained active as Director of the National Catholic Committee on Scouting until his death.

== Knights of Columbus ==
In 1923 the Knights of Columbus established a "Boy Life Bureau"; Brother Barnabas was appointed the bureau's first Executive Secretary. The Boy Movement Committee of the Supreme Council of the Knights of Columbus had sent questionnaires to each Grand Knight and after receiving the responses met with Brother Barnabas.

Though Knights of Columbus councils were involved in the Boy Scouts of America and other youth programs, it was decided to establish a youth section within the Order. Under the guidance of Brother Barnabas together with Supreme Director Daniel A. Tobin of Brooklyn, the first Columbian Squires circle was instituted on August 4, 1925.

According to Brother Barnabas, "The supreme purpose of the Columbian Squires is character building." Squires have fun and share their Catholic faith, help people in need, and enjoy the company of friends in social, family, athletic, cultural, civic and spiritual activities. Through their local circle, Squires work and socialize as a group of friends, elect their own officers, and develop into Catholic leaders.

== Other works ==
In 1914, he was asked to serve on the major’s committee and investigate reported widespread abuses in the management of private charitable institutions which were receiving public money. Many Catholic clergy saw this as an anti-Catholic act and he was forced to resign. The final report showed unsanitary conditions and lack of training in some Catholic institutions.

== Death ==
He died in Albuquerque, New Mexico on April 24, 1929.

== Legacy ==
The National Catholic Committee on Scouting’s highest award is named the ‘Brother Barnabas Founders Award’.

== See also ==
- Columbian Squires
- Lincolndale Agricultural School
- Institute of the Brothers of the Christian Schools
