= Catholic Daughters of the Americas =

American organization

- Crown and Cross emblem
- Abbreviation: CDA
- Formation: March 29, 1903; 123 years ago
- Type: Catholic fraternal service
- Headquarters: 10 West 71st Street; Manhattan, New York City
- Worthy National Regent: Emily Guilherme
- Website: www.catholicdaughters.org

Catholic Daughters of the Americas was founded in 1903, is one of the largest women's organizations in the Americas. Founded in Utica, New York, it has its headquarters in Manhattan, New York City.

== History ==
The Catholic Daughters of the Americas were founded by members of the Utica, New York branch of the Knights of Columbus and intended to operate as the organizations female auxiliary. When the first set of officers was elected on June 18, 1903, most of the leadership was male, including Supreme Regent John Carberry. The National Secretary, National Treasurer and three of the six members of the Board of Directors were also men. Supreme Vice-Regent Mary McKernan was the highest ranking woman and she became the group's first female Supreme Regent after the death of Carberry in August 1906.

Originally, the National Order of the Daughters of Isabella, the organization was very active during World War I, volunteering as nurses and clerks, hosting parties for servicemen, conducting sewing and knitting classes for the Red Cross, donating clothing for the needy and working with the blind. In 1921 the name was changed to the Catholic Daughters of America — until 1954, when it became Catholic Daughters of the Americas — and in 1925 the Knights of Columbus severed ties with the organization. Under the direction of Mary Duffy from 1923 to 1950 the group expanded vigorously, reaching 170,000 members in 1928. During World War II the Daughters were again active with 8,314 members serving in the Red Cross, over 72,000 completing the Red Cross courses, 7,468 members gave blood donations and 50,000 members sewed and knitted a million articles of clothing. The national organization and the courts combined purchased $5.13 million worth of war bonds and sold $3 million more.

The CDA bought their first national headquarters from the Knights of Columbus, Utica Council #185 in Utica, New York borrowing $10,000 at 5 percent interest to finance the purchase. In 1926 the headquarters was moved to its current location at 10 West 71 Street in New York City.

== Organization ==
Local chapters of CDA are called "Courts." In March 2016 there were over 12,000 Courts in 43 US states, Puerto Rico, Mexico, Guam and the Virgin Islands. When there are five local Courts in a given state, a "State Court" is organized. The National Court is the governing body of the Order when assembled in its biennial convention. Between meetings of the National Court, the Order is run by the National Board, which includes five National Officers along with the Nine National Directors. This group meets semiannually, at a place and time determined by the National Regent.

== Membership ==
The Order is open to any Catholic woman over 18. As stated, the Order reached 170,000 members in 1928. Membership reached 215,000 in the late 1960s, but declined to 174,103 by 1979. In the late 1980s it was down to 170,000 and stood at 160,000 in 1994 In 2012 there were 75,000 members in some 1,250 courts (local chapters) in 45 states across the country, and in Puerto Rico, Mexico, Guam, and the Virgin Islands.

== Junior Catholic Daughters of the Americas ==
This youth auxiliary was founded in 1925. its membership is divided into three age levels, Juniorettes (6-10), Juniors (11-14) and Teens (15-18). In 1979 there were approximately 250 local units with 5,000 members.

== Causes ==
The Catholic Daughters support the Catholic Church, the clergy, and various educational and charitable causes. They have historically been interested in helping physically and mentally handicapped children, unwed mothers, the disenfranchised and the needy. They have also been known for their opposition to abortion and pornography.

== See also ==
- Columbiettes
- Daughters of Isabella
