= Silent Spring Revolution =

2022 book by Douglas Brinkley

Silent Spring Revolution: John F. Kennedy, Rachel Carson, Lyndon Johnson, Richard Nixon, and the Great Environmental Awakening
- Author: Douglas Brinkley
- Language: English
- Subject: Environmentalism in the "long sixties"
- Publisher: Harper
- Publication date: November 15, 2022
- Pages: 893
- ISBN: 978-0-06-321291-6

Silent Spring Revolution: John F. Kennedy, Rachel Carson, Lyndon Johnson, Richard Nixon, and the Great Environmental Awakening is a 2022 nonfiction book by Douglas Brinkley that examines third-wave environmentalism in the "long sixties" (1960–1973). The book was reviewed in several publications.
