= Michael J. McGivney =

Founder of the Knights of Columbus (1852–1890)

Blessed Michael J. McGivney
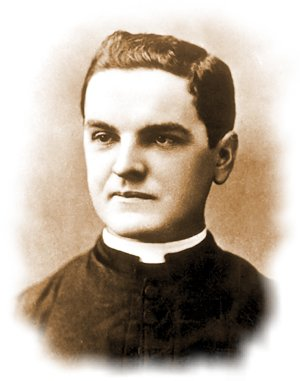
- Fr. Michael J. McGivney, c. 1890
- Born: Michael Joseph McGivney; August 12, 1852; Waterbury, Connecticut, U.S.
- Died: August 14, 1890 (aged 38); Thomaston, Connecticut, U.S.
- Venerated in: Catholic Church
- Beatified: October 31, 2020, Cathedral of Saint Joseph, Hartford, Connecticut, United States by Joseph Cardinal Tobin (on behalf of Pope Francis)
- Major shrine: Church of Saint Mary, New Haven, Connecticut, United States
- Feast: August 13

Michael Joseph McGivney (August 12, 1852 – August 14, 1890) was an American Catholic priest based in New Haven, Connecticut. He founded the Knights of Columbus at a local parish to serve as a mutual aid and insurance organization, particularly for immigrants and their families. It developed through the 20th century as the world's largest Catholic fraternal organization.

The cause for his canonization started in the Archdiocese of Hartford in 1996; in March 2008, Pope Benedict XVI declared McGivney "Venerable" in recognition of his "heroic virtue". On May 27, 2020, Pope Francis announced that McGivney had been approved for beatification, which officially occurred on October 31, 2020.

== Early life ==
=== Childhood and youth ===
Michael McGivney was born in Waterbury, Connecticut, on August 12, 1852, to Irish immigrant parents, Patrick and Mary (née Devine) McGivney. He was the eldest of 13 children, six of whom died in infancy or childhood. Patrick worked as a molder at a brass mill in Waterbury.

McGivney attended public school in Waterbury. Termed a well behaved and proficient student, he was able to graduate high school in 1865 at age 13. McGivney then started working in one of brass mills in Waterbury, making metal spoons. While still a teenager, he decided that he wanted to become a priest.

=== Studies for the priesthood ===
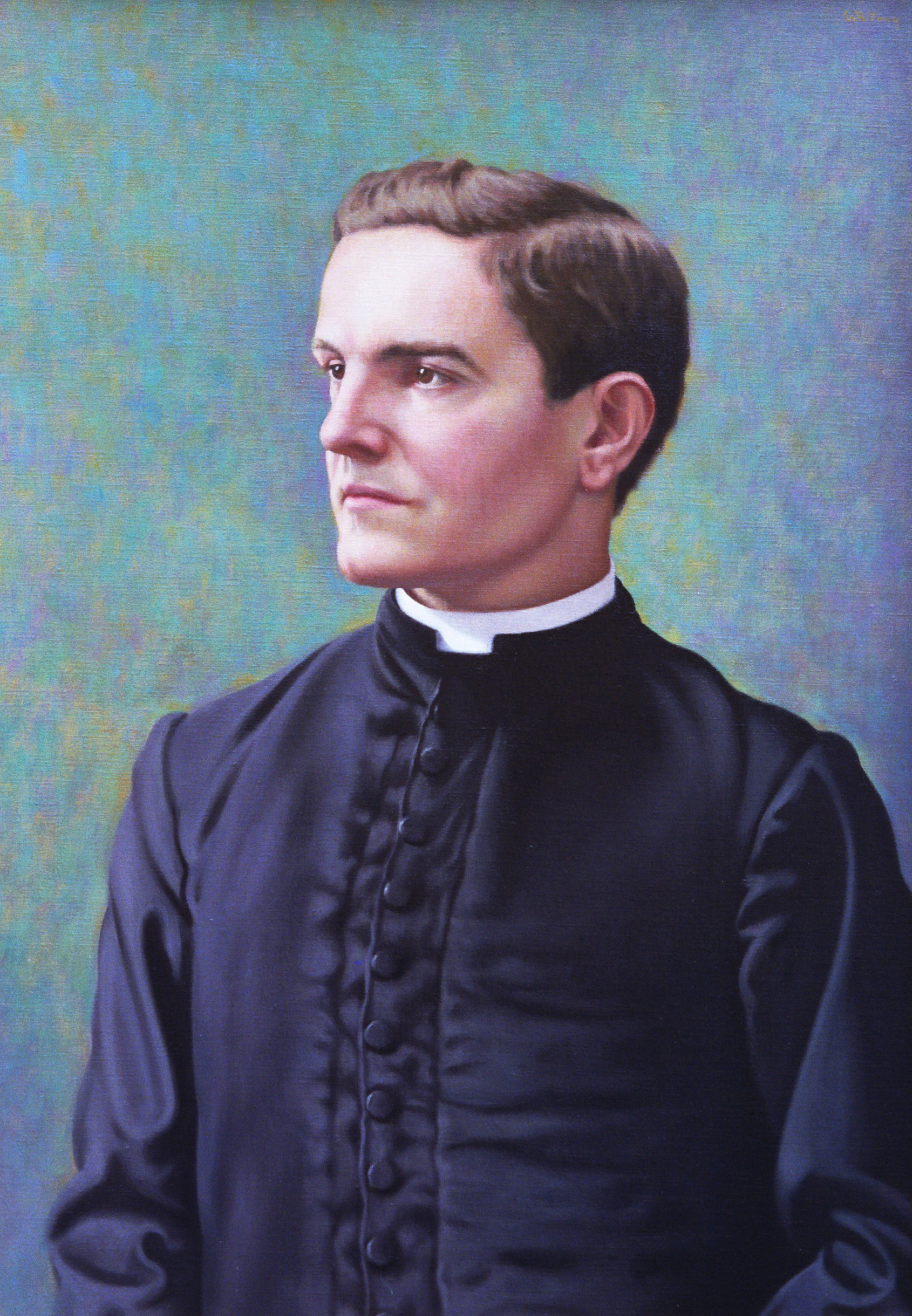
Michael J. McGivney

In 1868, at age 16, McGivney entered the Séminaire de Saint-Hyacinthe in Saint-Hyacinthe, Quebec, in Canada. He continued his studies in 1871 at Our Lady of Angels Seminary in Lewiston, New York. While at Our Lady, he and other seminarians formed a baseball team; McGivney was described as a "naturally talented ballplayer."

A year later, McGivney enrolled in the Collège Sainte-Marie de Montréal, operated by the Jesuits in Montreal, Quebec. Patrick McGivney died in 1873, forcing his son to leave Sainte-Marie. At this point, he could not afford more seminary training. However, seeing McGivney's potential, Bishop Francis Patrick McFarland of the Diocese of Hartford elected to pay for the seminarian's remaining education at St. Mary's Seminary in Baltimore, Maryland.

=== Ordination ===
McGivney was ordained a priest for the Diocese of Hartford on December 22, 1877, by Archbishop James Gibbons of Baltimore at the Cathedral of the National Shrine of the Assumption in Baltimore. Several days later, McGivney celebrated his first mass at Immaculate Conception Church in Waterbury with his mother in attendance.

== Ministry ==
=== St. Mary's Parish ===
After his ordination in 1877, the diocese assigned McGivney as an assistant pastor at St. Mary's Parish, the first Catholic parish in New Haven, Connecticut. During this period, McGivney had to deal with anti-Catholic sentiments among some elements of the New Haven population. He proved to be very capable in communicating with Protestants in the community, attracting some to hear him preach in church.

McGivney staged plays, outings and fairs for his parishioners, believing in their value to deliver positive moral messages. He also reinvigorated the St. Joseph’s Young Men’s Total Abstinence and Literary Society (TAL), a temperance group in the parish. McGiveney built a reputation for his faith, energy and kindness. In 1879, McGivney served as the executive producer for Handy Andy, a played performed by TAL at a local theater. McGivney staged Pyke O’Callaghan, an Irish melodrama, in 1880 at the Grand Opera House in New Haven.

A parishioner at St. Mary's, Edward Downes, died during this period, leaving his wife and four children with no money. Under Connecticut law, the state could place indigent children in institutions if a surety bond could not be placed by someone to guarantee their care. One of the three children, Alfred Downes, could not be bonded. At a hearing in probate court, McGivney told the judge that he would pay the $1,500 bond for Alfred. McGivney did not have the money, but a local grocer lent it to him. Alfred was able to stay with his family.

=== Visiting condemned murderer ===
In December 1881, an intoxicated James "Chip" Smith was causing a disturbance in Ansonia, Connecticut, shooting his gun in the air. He was a 22-year-old Catholic man with a history of alcohol abuse who had recently threatened the lives of his mother and others. When the local chief of police tried to arrest Smith, he shot the policeman, fatally wounding him.

Over the next few months, McGivney visited Smith in prison on an almost daily basis. The two men talked and prayed together. Smith was convicted of murder in April 1882 and sentenced to be hung in May of that year. On the night before his execution, Smith requested an altar for his cell so he could pray. The local newspapers commended McGivney for his positive influence on Smith.

=== Establishing Knights of Columbus ===
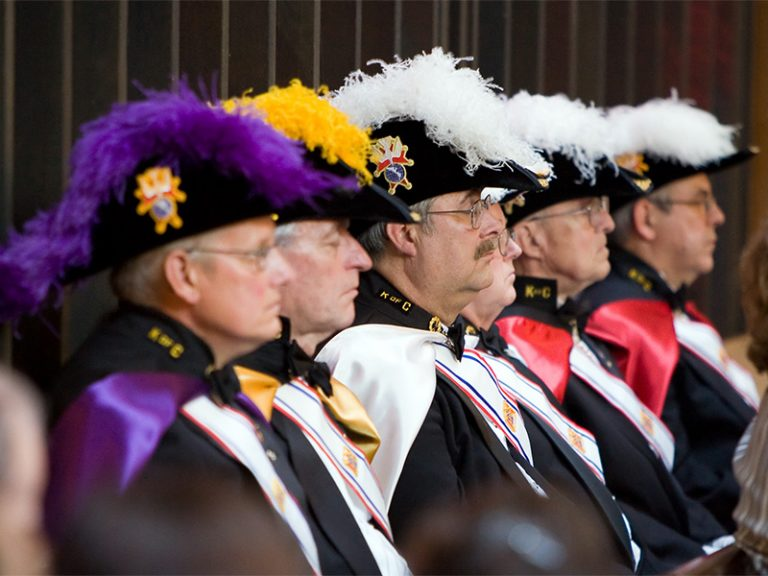
Knights of Columbus (2008)

During the second half of the 19th century, the Catholic hierarchy in the United States became concerned about Irish Catholic men joining extremist secret societies such as the Molly Maguires or the Fenian Brotherhood.The bishops were very receptive to the creation of fraternal groups that embrace Catholic values and American patriotism. From his own experience, McGivney recognized the devastating effect on immigrant families of the father's untimely death. Many of these families were split, with the children suffering the loss of parents and estrangement from the Catholic Church.

On March 29, 1882, McGivney officially founded the Knights of Columbus in New Haven with a small group of male parishioners from St. Mary's. It was designed as a mutual aid society. If a knight died, the other member would provide financial aid to the widow and children. The organization developed as a fraternal society. The Knights had great appeal to many veterans of the American Civil War of the early 1860s, who saw nobility in the organization's defense of the Catholic faith. McGivney named the group after the Italian explorer Christopher Columbus to highlight the long history of Catholics in North America.

The new Knights of Columbus voted McGivney as their first leader. However, he declined the position, wanting a layman to have it. In 1884, McGiveney resigned his existing role in the Knights, remaining only as its chaplain. At this time, the idea of lay people operating a Catholic organization in the United States was very new.

=== St. Thomas Parish ===
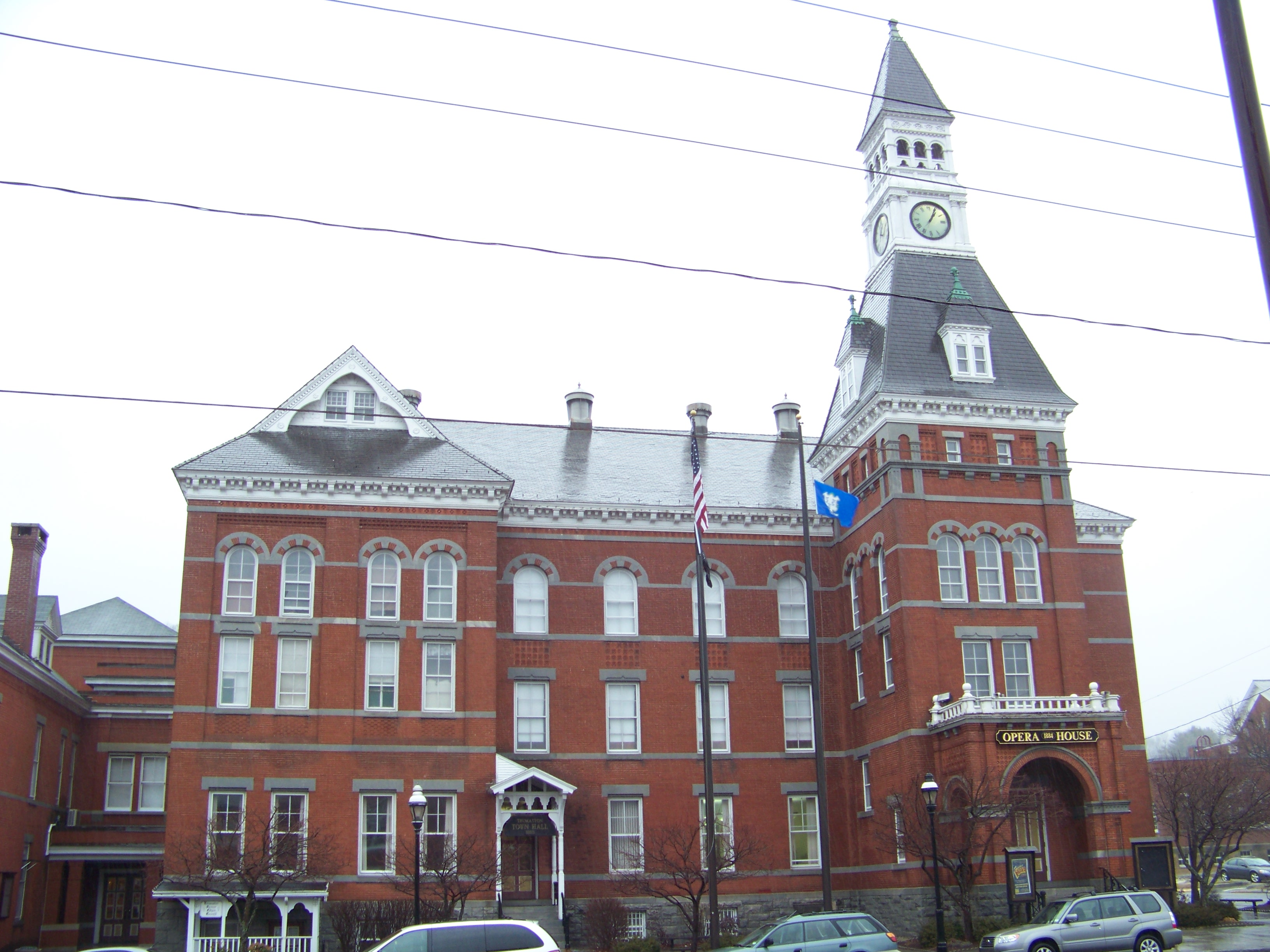
Thomaston Opera House, Thomaston, Connecticut (2010)

The diocese transferred McGivney in 1884 to serve as pastor of St. Thomas Church in Thomaston, Connecticut. In March 1885, McGivney staged a production of the drama Eileen Oge or Dark’s the Hour Before the Dawn, based on an Irish folk ballad, at the Thomaston Opera House. Before the play opened, he traveled to New York City to obtain costumes. That same year, he established Atlantic Council 18 of the Knights of Columbus in Thomaston.

=== Death ===
In 1889, McGivney became sick during the so-called Russian Flu pandemic. That year, he also contracted tuberculosis. In January 1890, McGivney was diagnosed with pneumonia and was confined to the rectory at St. Thomas. On August 14, 1890, he died at the rectory.

Over 70 priests and numerous civic officials attended his funeral. The 57 chapters of the Knights of Columbus sent delegations to attend the ceremony. He is interred in a sarcophagus at St. Mary's Church in New Haven.

== Cause of canonization ==
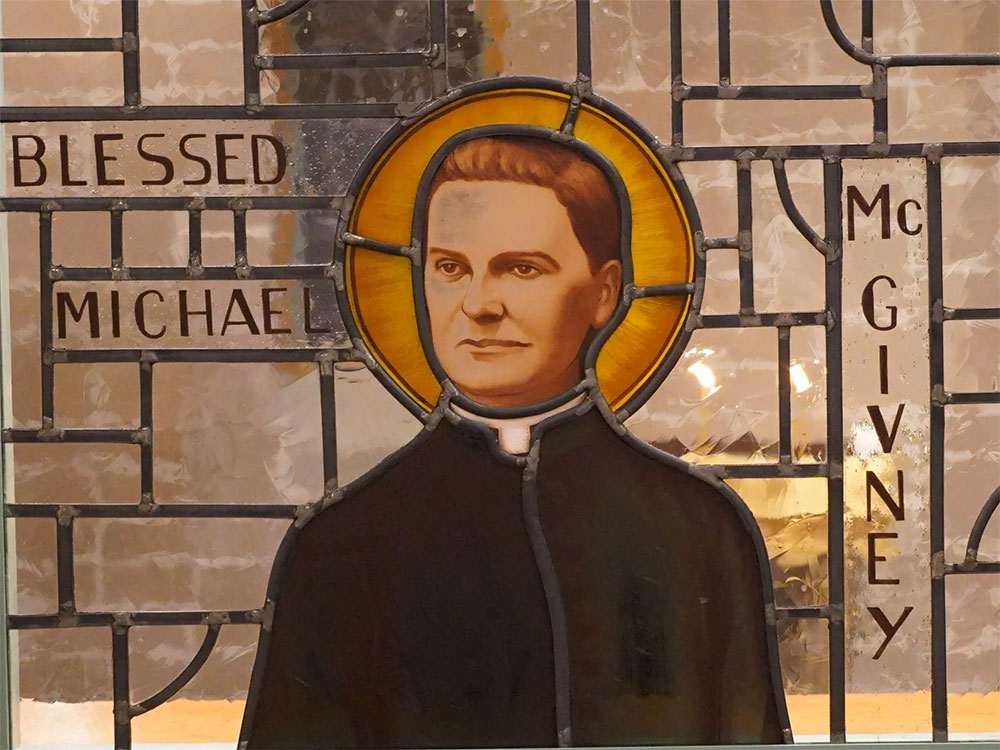
McGivney window, St. Catherine of Siena Church, Trumbull, Connecticut

=== Declaration as venerable ===
In 1996, the Archdiocese of Hartford opened the McGivney cause for canonization. Gabriel O'Donnell is the postulator of McGivney's cause. He is also the director of the Fr. McGivney Guild, which now has 150,000 members supporting his cause.

The archdiocese closed the McGivney investigation in 2000 and submitted the case to the Congregation for the Causes of Saints in Rome. In 2008, Pope Benedict XVI approved a decree recognizing McGivney's heroic virtue, thus declaring him as "Venerable". The pope made these remarks,

“We need but think of the remarkable accomplishment of that exemplary American priest, the Venerable Michael McGivney, whose vision and zeal led to the establishment of the Knights of Columbus.” Through the spiritual genius of Father McGivney, the Knights of Columbus has become a way for Catholic men to transform friends into brothers — brothers who care for one another.

The archdiocese had submitted two possible miracles attributed to McGivney to the Congregation, but they had been dismissed after investigation.

=== Beatification ===
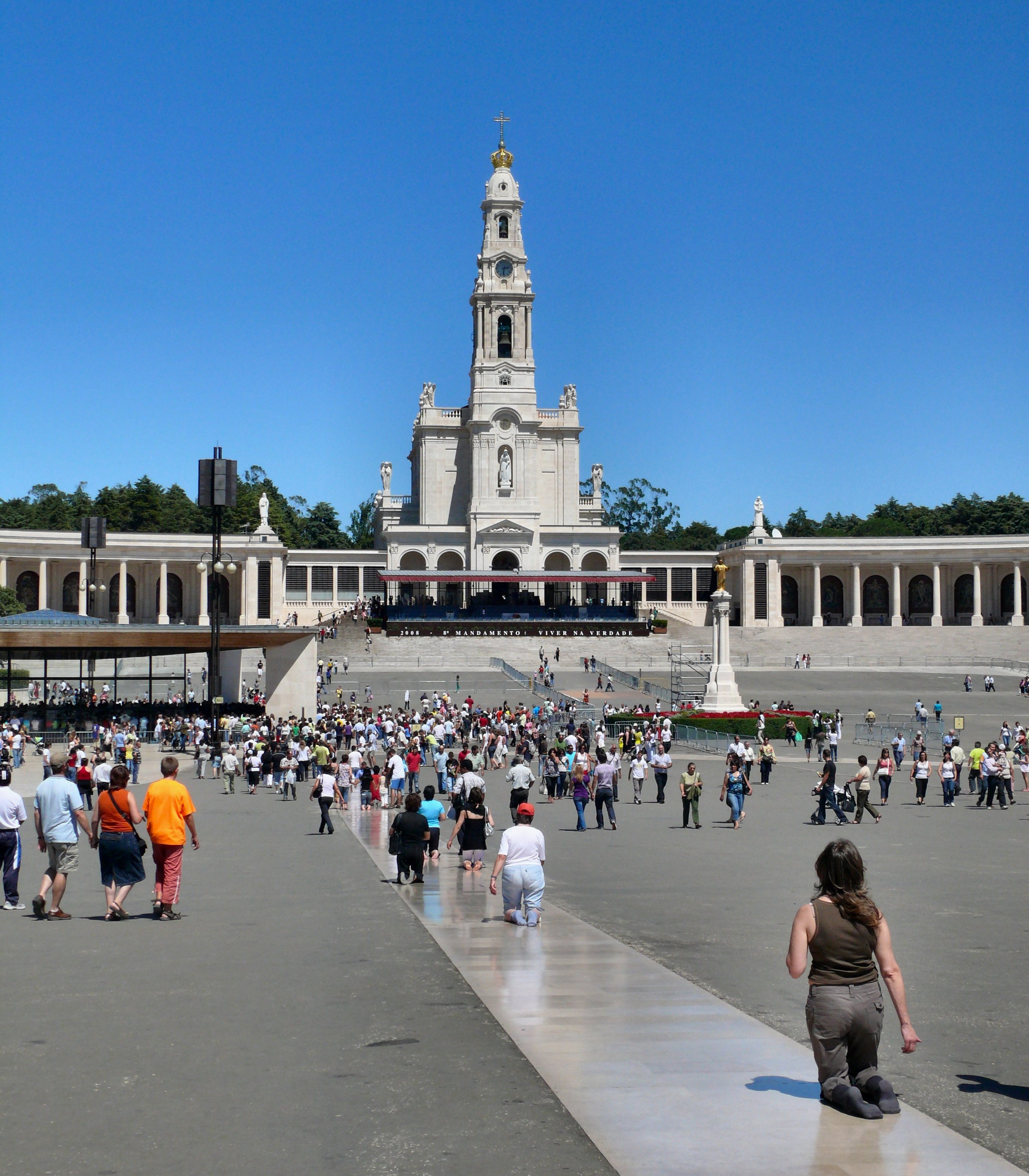
Sanctuary of Fátima, Portugal

In February 2015, doctors at Vanderbilt University Medical Center in Nashville, Tennessee, told Dan and Michelle Schachle, a young Catholic couple from Dickson, Tennessee, that the child Michelle was carrying had fetal hydrops, edema in two fetal compartments. The prognosis was death a few days after birth. Dan was working as a general agent for the life insurance group of the Knights of Columbus in the Mid-South Region. The Schachles immediately asked their family and fellow parishioners to pray to McGivney for intercession. In March 2015, the couple went on a previously planned pilgrimage to the Sanctuary of Fátima in Fátima, Portugal. While there, they heard a priest recite the passage from John 4:43-54 in the New Testament, which was about Jesus healing the son of a royal official.

When the Schachles went for a prenatal check-up four days after returning to Tennessee, doctors could find no evidence of the fetal hydrops in Michelle's ultrasound test. They had no explanation for the changes. Michael McGivney Schachle was born prematurely on May 15, 2015. He had other health issues, but did not die.

An investigation of the Schachle cure as a possible miracle soon started. A tribunal of the Diocese of Nashville was called to investigate the case, the first such tribunal in the history of the diocese. After concluding that the case was indeed a miracle, the tribunal sent the case to the Congregation. On May 27, 2020, the Congregation verified the miracle and Pope Francis authorized it.

At that point, McGivney met all the criteria for beatification. On October 31, 2020, the beatification mass for McGivney was celebrated at the Cathedral of Saint Joseph in Hartford, Connecticut with Cardinal Joseph W. Tobin presiding on the Pope's behalf. The Blessed Michael McGivney Pilgrimage Center opened in November 2020 in New Haven.

== Legacy ==
As of 2026, the Knights of Columbus had over two million members in 17,000 councils worldwide. The organization donated over $200 million to charities in 2025 and recorded 48 million volunteer hours by its members. The New York State Council Knights of Columbus has a project to install a statue of McGivney in every Catholic diocese in the state. As of 2026, it has placed statues in the Dioceses of Brooklyn, New York, Ogdensburg and Rockville Centre.

In a 2020 article in the National Catholic Register, the priest Roger J. Landry noted that McGivney did not leave any written records - sermons, speeches, journal entries or letters. His legacy was in the actions and deeds that he performed as a parish priest. McGivney is memorialized at the following places:

- Blessed Michael J. McGivney Elementary School, Brampton, Ontario
- Father McGivney Catholic High School in Glen Carbon, Illinois
- Father Michael McGivney Catholic Academy in Markham, Ontario.
- McGivney Hall, Catholic University of America in Washington D.C.
- McGivney statue, St. Patrick's Cathedral in New York City
- Stained-glass window of McGivney, St. John Fisher Seminary in Stamford, Connecticut
Images of McGivney

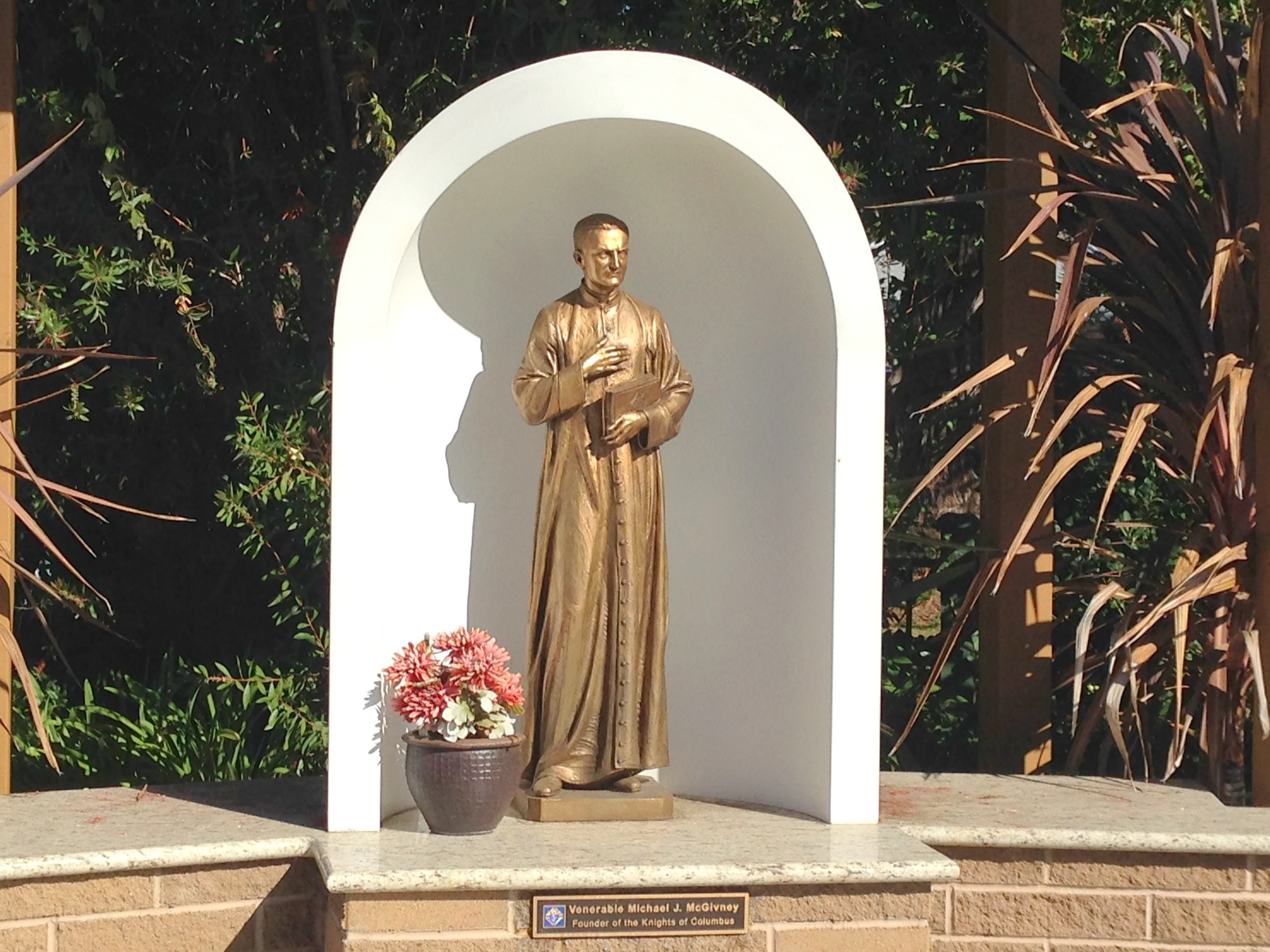
McGivney statue, Church of the Ascension, Saratoga, California, United States

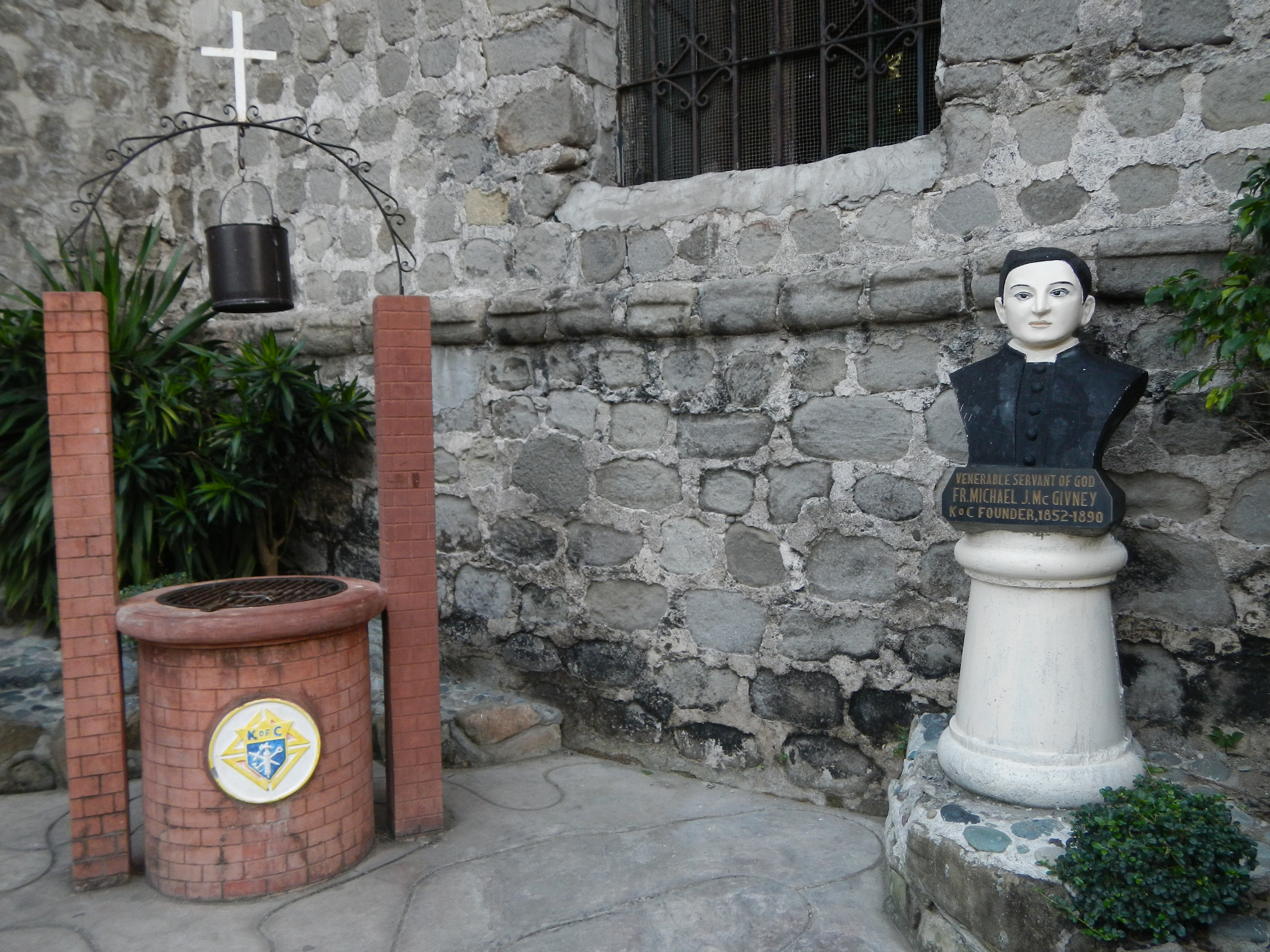
McGivney monument. Sts. Peter & Paul Church, Bauang, La Union, Philippines

== Bibliography ==
Parish Priest: Father Michael McGivney and American Catholicism, Douglas Brinkley and Julie M. Fenster' (2006) published by William Morrow and Company

== See also ==
- List of beatified people
- Roman Catholicism in the United States#American Catholic Servants of God, Venerables, Beatified, and Saints
- Knights of Columbus
