= Daughters of Isabella =

Catholic fraternal service organization

- Crown and Cross emblem
- Abbreviation: D of I
- Formation: March 29, 1897; 129 years ago
- Type: Catholic fraternal service
- Headquarters: International Circle, New Haven, Connecticut
- International Regent: Susanne Suchy
- Website: www.daughtersofisabella.net

The Daughters of Isabella is a spiritual, social and charitable organization that was started as a female auxiliary of the Knights of Columbus. The first circle of the Order was founded in New Haven, Connecticut, in 1897, as an auxiliary to the Rev. John Russell Council of the Knights of Columbus for the purpose of uniting all Catholic women in a sisterhood to achieve the following aims; to know one another better, to extend our circle of friends, to centralize all our resources to better help one another and to be a greater force to contend with in the pursuit of good in our society. Its patroness and namesake is Queen Isabella of Castile, Spain.

== Membership ==
A member must be a Catholic woman over the age of 16.

The organization has about thirty thousand members as of the 2018 International Convention. There are chapters in Canada and the United States.

== Organization ==
The Daughters of Isabella is organized on 3 levels: Local, State and International. Local circles usually meet once a month, State circles meet at least once every two years to set goals and to elect new leaders and the International circle meets every other year for convention and includes all members of the Daughters of Isabella.

The organization is founded on the principles of Unity, Friendship, and Charity.

== See also ==
- Catholic Daughters of the Americas
- Columbiettes
