= The Reagan Diaries =

Edited and published version of diaries by Ronald Reagan during his presidency

- Editor: Douglas Brinkley
- Author: Ronald Reagan
- Language: English
- Genre: Diary
- Published: May 22, 2007; May 19, 2009 (The Reagan Diaries Unabridged)
- Publisher: HarperCollins
- Publication place: United States
- Media type: Print (hardback)
- Pages: 784
- ISBN: 0-06-087600-X
- OCLC: 85850929
- Dewey Decimal: 973.927092 B 22
- LC Class: E877 .A3 2007

The Reagan Diaries is an edited and published version of the diaries kept by Ronald Reagan during his presidency. The book was edited by Douglas Brinkley and was published by HarperCollins in 2007, three years after Reagan's death. It reached the number one spot on The New York Times Best Seller list. The complete diaries of his presidency were published in an unabridged form in 2009.

== Reagan's diaries ==
Reagan was one of five U.S. presidents to have kept a consistent diary as president, and the only one to do so each day, never neglecting an entry (even when he was in the hospital recovering from his assassination attempt). The diaries number five volumes of thick, maroon, leather-bound books, normally kept in the White House residence, written in simple, sing-song prose, with many misspellings.

Former First Lady Nancy Reagan made the diaries available to be transcribed in 2005, and the Reagan Library Foundation partnered with HarperCollins to print them in 2007. The company paid seven figures for the world publication rights.

In them, Reagan wrote about his relationship with his children, once writing that he refused to talk to his son, Ron, and about his relationship, love, devotion, for his wife. When Nancy Reagan was away on her frequent "Just Say No" anti-drug crusades, Reagan wrote in his diary about going "upstairs to a lonely old house," and noted their anniversary as "29 years of more happiness than any man could rightly deserve." Also writing about his wife, he stated "I pray I'll never face a day when she isn't there." Although he was not a regular churchgoer, his simple faith is consistent in the diaries, and he never spelled out even mild swear words, with "hell" being written as h--l, and "damn" as d--n.

Compared to other presidential writings of innermost thoughts, Reagan's thoughts appear far more shallow. However, their original intent does not suggest that they were meant to capture deep thoughts. One reviewer wrote, "No one expected Reagan to be introspective or philosophical in his diary, ... which is why he elided his mild cursing ("d--n" and "h--l") and was circumspect in other ways".

The head archivist at the Reagan Library, Mike Dugan, described Reagan's writings by saying, "I wouldn't call it an introspective diary, but he states his position. What you read confirms that what you saw with Reagan is what you got."

== Gallery ==
The actual diaries are on display at the Ronald Reagan Presidential Library and Museum.
