= Julie M. Fenster =

American writer (born 1957)

- Born: November 20, 1957 (age 68)
- Education: Colgate University
- Writing career
- Genre: non-fiction
- Subjects: American history; medical history; biography; automotive history; travel; business and economics

Julie M. Fenster (born November 20, 1957) is an American author of historical articles and books focusing on 19th-century events and persons.

== Biography ==
Fenster graduated from Colgate University with a Bachelor of Arts degree. She worked as a journalist for the Syracuse Post-Standard and Automobile Quarterly.

In the 1990s, she wrote travel guides, including Boston Guide (Open Road Publishing, 1997), and America's Grand Hotels (Open Road Publishing, 1998).

Fenster wrote American history articles for American Heritage magazine, several of which were later expanded into books. She has also written for Invention & Technology, The New York Times, Los Angeles Times, American History, and Audacity.

In January 2006, she and co-author Douglas Brinkley released Parish Priest, a biography of Father Michael J. McGivney, the founder of the Knights of Columbus. In 2009, she published a biography of Franklin D. Roosevelt's early political advisor Louis Howe, titled FDR's Shadow: Louis Howe, the Force that Shaped Franklin and Eleanor Roosevelt.

She is the co-author of Debbie Wasserman Schultz's 2013 book For the Next Generation: A Wake-Up Call to Solving Our Nation's Problems.

She appeared in a TV commercial for Cheapbooks, which aired in early 2008. She is shown at a book signing for her work Race of the Century.

== Notable works ==
- Ether Day: The Strange Tale of America's Greatest Medical Discovery and the Haunted Men Who Made It. New York: Harper (2001) ISBN 0060195231
- Mavericks, Miracles, and Medicine: The Pioneers Who Risked Their Lives to Bring Medicine into the Modern Age. Carroll & Graf (2003) ISBN 0786712368
- Race of the Century: The Heroic True Story of the 1908 New York to Paris Auto Race. New York: Crown (2006) ISBN 0609610961
- Packard: The Pride. New Albany, IN: Automobile Quarterly Publications (2005)
- Parish Priest: Father Michael McGivney and American Catholicism (with Douglas Brinkley). New York: Morrow (2006)
- The Case of Abraham Lincoln: A Story of Adultery, Murder, and the Making of a Great President. New York: Palgrave Macmillan (2007) ISBN 140397635X
- FDR's Shadow: Louis Howe, the Force That Shaped Franklin and Eleanor Roosevelt. New York: Palgrave Macmillan (2009) ISBN 0230609104
- The Spirit of Invention: The Story of the Thinkers, Creators, and Dreamers Who Formed Our Nation. New York, NY: HarperCollins (2009) ISBN 9780061231896
- Jefferson's America: The Expeditions That Made a Nation. New York: Crown (2014) ISBN 0307956482

== Awards ==
In 2003, she won The Anesthesia Foundation's 2003 Book/Multimedia Education Award for Ether Day.
