= Columbian Squires =

International youth fraternity run by the Knights of Columbus

- Maltese Cross emblem
- Abbreviation: CS
- Formation: April 4, 1925; 101 years ago
- Founder: Barnabas McDonald
- Type: Catholic fraternal youth organization
- Headquarters: New Haven, Connecticut
- Region served: U.S.A. Canada; Mexico; The Philippines; Cuba; Panama; Guatemala; Puerto Rico; The Bahamas; The Virgin Islands; Guam
- Members: 25,000 (approximately)
- Parent organization: Knights of Columbus
- Website: Columbian Squires

The Columbian Squires is an international youth fraternity run by the Knights of Columbus for Catholic boys between the ages of 10 and 18.

== History ==
The Squires were established under the direction of Brother Barnabas McDonald, F.S.C., together with Supreme Director Daniel A. Tobin on August 4, 1925. At that time there was a national interest in youth in the United States, as reflected by the development of the Boy Scouts of America and the Big Brother movement.

As of 2016, the formation of new Squire Circles in the United States and Canada is discouraged, since the Catholic Church has a desire to move youth activities from exclusive clubs into the local parish youth groups.

== See also ==
- Wilbur F. Schneider (1956). An Analysis of the Program of the Columbian Squires in the Light of Modern Educational Theory (M. Ed.). University of Louisville. OCLC 41585945.
