= Lincolndale Agricultural School =

Coordinates: 41°19′15.4″N 73°43′12.1″W

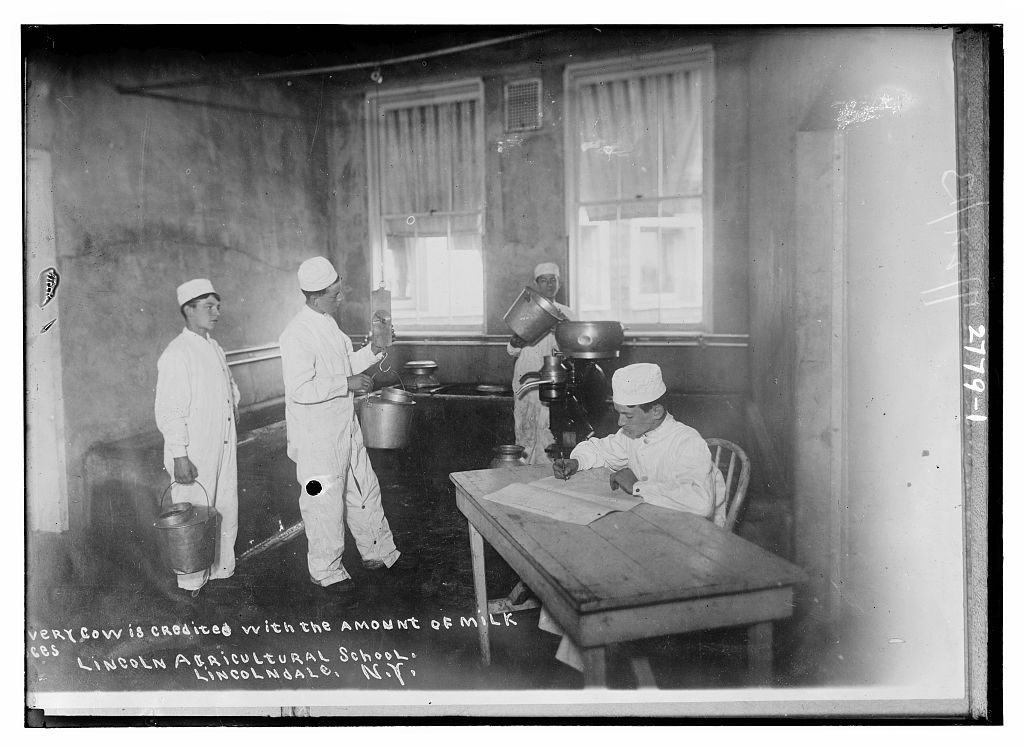
- Boys at the Lincolndale Agricultural School process milk from the cows on the school's farm
- Lincolndale, New York; United States

Information
- Religious affiliation: Christian
- Denomination: Roman Catholic
- Established: 1912
- Founder: Barnabas McDonald

Lincolndale Agricultural School for Boys was a Catholic charity run by Barnabas McDonald in Lincolndale, New York. It opened in 1912 for orphans to be trained for agricultural and industrial work.

== Background ==
Lincolndale Agricultural School was an adjunct to the New York Catholic Protectory, a facility for orphans, children referred by the courts, or those entrusted by parents who were unable to provide adequate care. The main campus was located in the Parkchester section of the Bronx. The Boys Department was managed by the Christian Brothers, while the girls and younger children were cared for by the Sisters of Charity of New York. In 1902, the brothers opened St. Philip's Home on Broome Street in Manhattan as transitional housing for boys who had "aged out" of the Protectory's care program. It assisted with job placement and served as a center to help former students establish themselves to live independently.

== History ==
In 1907, the Protectory purchased a number of farms in Lincolndale, a hamlet in Somers in Westchester County, New York. While the boys at the Parkchester campus received training in the building trades, printing, shoemaking, tailoring, photography, and other potential job-related skills, the boys at Lincolndale learned farming and agricultural skills, with the intent that they might be placed out on farms. Rather than living in a large dormitory, a number of cottages were built, each housing fifty boys, with each cottage under the direction of two brothers. The School produced its own food on the dairy farm and truck farm. Fruits and vegetables were canned and preserved.

In "Brother Barnabas" by W. J. Battersby PhD, it states BB became director in January 1909 of the school, renaming it the next month for Abraham Lincoln. He was there until 1914.
