= Douglas Brinkley =

American historian (born 1960)

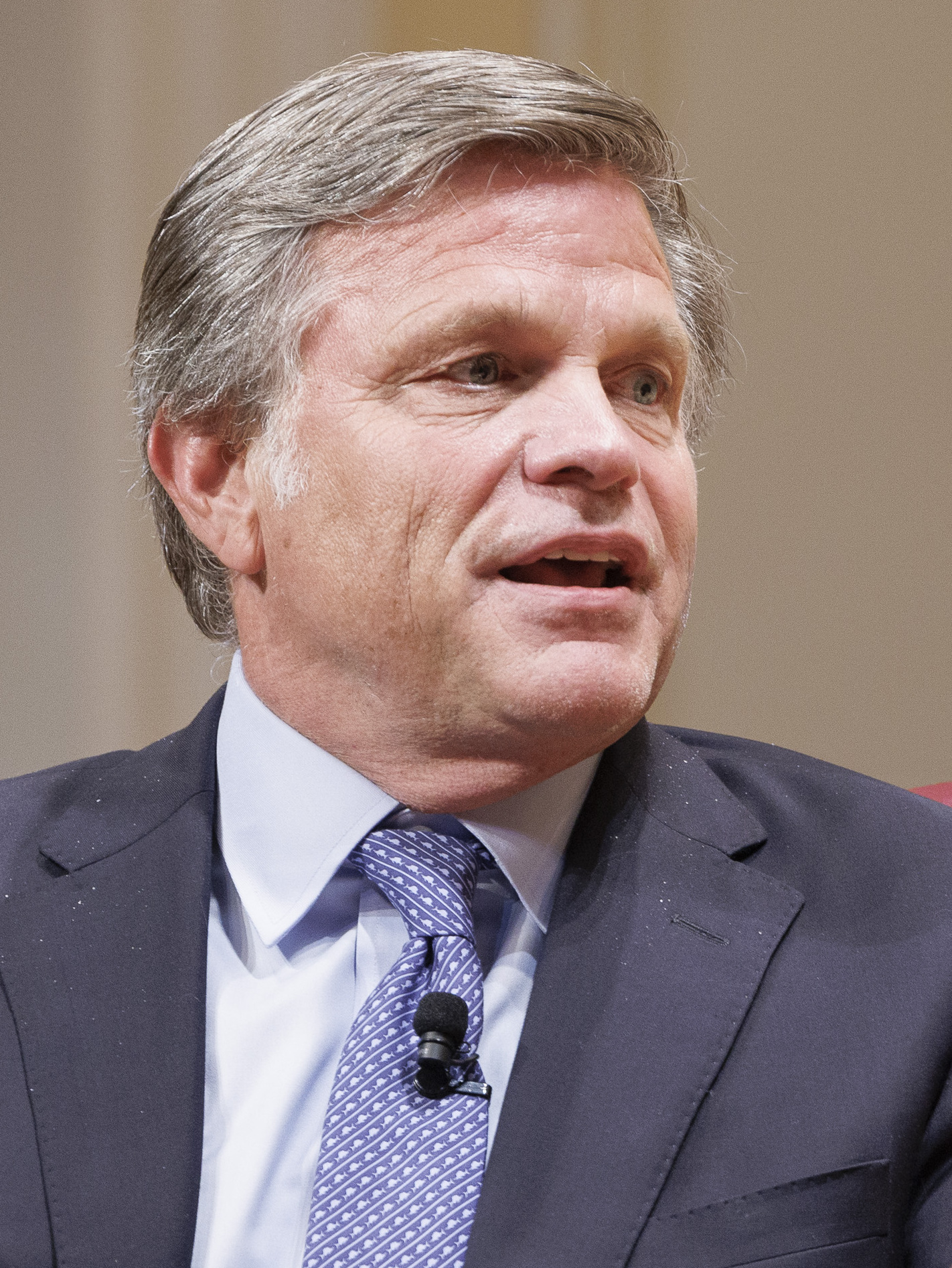
- Brinkley in 2023
- Born: December 14, 1960 (age 65); Atlanta, Georgia, U.S.
- Education: Ohio State University (BA); Georgetown University (MA, PhD)
- Occupation: Historian
- Writing career
- Genre: Nonfiction

Douglas Brinkley (born December 14, 1960) is an American author, Katherine Tsanoff Brown Chair in Humanities, and professor of history at Rice University. Brinkley is a history commentator for CNN, Presidential Historian for the New York Historical, and a contributing editor to the magazine Vanity Fair. He is a public spokesperson on conservation issues. He joined the faculty of Rice University as a professor of history in 2007. Brinkley joined the board of directors for the National Archives Foundation in 2023.

== Early life ==
Brinkley was born in Atlanta, Georgia, in 1960, but after his father was transferred to the Toledo, Ohio headquarters of Owens-Illinois in 1969, did his remaining elementary and secondary schooling in Perrysburg, Ohio. His mother was a high school English teacher. In fourth grade Doug memorized the Presidents, their vice presidents, as well as the opposing presidential and vice presidential candidates.

== Education ==
Brinkley was educated at Perrysburg High School, followed by Ohio State University, from which he earned a B.A. (1982), and Georgetown University, earning an M.A. (1983) and Ph.D. (1989) in U.S. diplomatic history. He has been on the faculty of Hofstra University, the University of New Orleans, Tulane University, and Rice University.

He received an honorary doctorate for his contributions to American letters from Trinity College in Hartford, Connecticut.

== Life and career ==
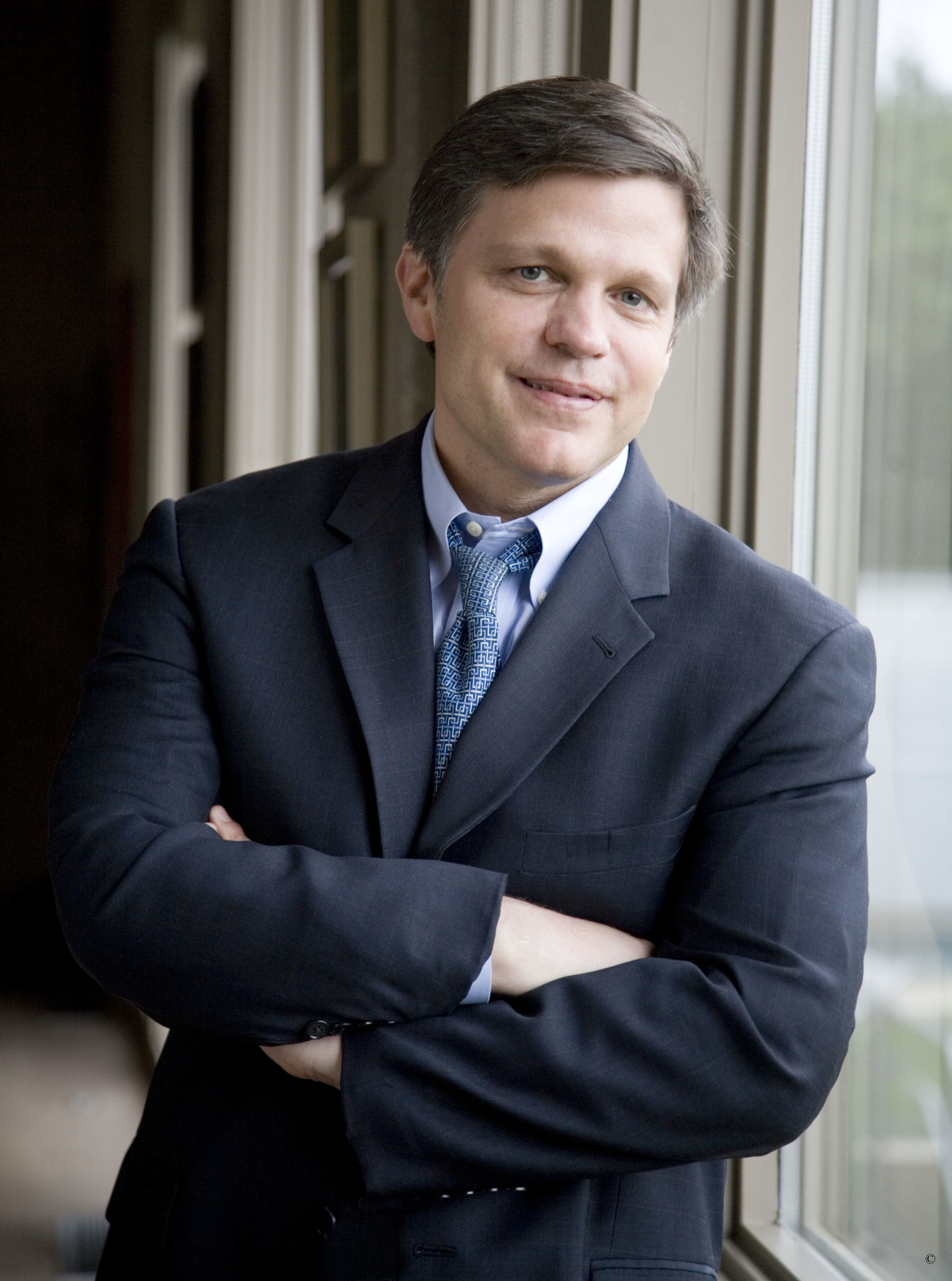
Brinkley in 2007

During his time in Georgetown, Brinkley worked as the night manager at Second Story Books in DC. During the early 1990s, Brinkley taught American Arts and Politics for Hofstra aboard the Majic Bus, a roving transcontinental classroom, from which emerged the book The Majic Bus: An American Odyssey (1993). In 1993, he left Hofstra to teach at the University of New Orleans, where he taught the class again using two natural-gas fueled buses. According to the Associated Press, "...if you can't tour the United States yourself, the next best thing is to go along with Douglas Brinkley aboard The Majic Bus."

Brinkley worked closely with his mentor, historian Stephen E. Ambrose, then director of the Eisenhower Center for American Studies at the University of New Orleans. Ambrose chose Brinkley to become director of the Eisenhower Center, a post he held for five years before moving to Tulane University.

Brinkley's first book was Jean Monnet: The Path to European Unity (1992). His second was Dean Acheson: The Cold War Years (1992). He then co-edited a monograph series with Arthur Schlesinger, Jr. and William vanden Heuvel in the 1990s. Brinkley also edited a volume on Dean Acheson and the Making of US Foreign Policy with Paul H. Nitze (1993). In 1999, he published The Unfinished Presidency about Jimmy Carter's active and influential post-presidency.

Brinkley is the literary executor for his late friend, the journalist and author Hunter S. Thompson. He is also the editor of a three-volume collection of Thompson's letters. Brinkley is also the authorized biographer for Beat generation author Jack Kerouac, having edited Kerouac's diaries as Windblown World (2004).

In 2004, Brinkley released Tour of Duty: John Kerry and the Vietnam War, about U.S. Senator John Kerry's prior military service and anti-war activism during the Vietnam War. The 2004 documentary movie Going Upriver: The Long War of John Kerry is loosely based on Brinkley's book. Brinkley also wrote the Atlantic Monthly cover story of December 2003 on Kerry.

Brinkley's book The Great Deluge: Hurricane Katrina, New Orleans, and the Mississippi Gulf Coast is a record of the effects of Hurricane Katrina on the Gulf Coast. The book won the 2007 Robert F. Kennedy Book Award and was a Los Angeles Times Book Prize finalist. He also served as the primary historian for Spike Lee's documentary about Hurricane Katrina, When the Levees Broke: A Requiem in Four Acts. Critic Nancy Franklin in The New Yorker noted that Brinkley made up a "large part" of the film's "conscience."

Brinkley's biography of Walter Cronkite, Cronkite was published in 2012. It was also selected as a Washington Post Book of the Year.

Brinkley and Johnny Depp were nominated for a Grammy for their co-authoring of the liner notes to the documentary: Gonzo: The Life and Work of Dr. Hunter S. Thompson. He also co-edited with Johnny Depp the long lost novel of Woody Guthrie titled House of Earth.

=== Congressional hearing ===
On November 18, 2011, during his testimony before a Congressional hearing on drilling in the Arctic National Wildlife Refuge, Brinkley had a heated exchange with Rep. Don Young. Young, who had not been present during Brinkley's testimony, nonetheless characterized it as "garbage" and addressed Brinkley as "Dr. Rice." In response, Brinkley stated, "It's Dr. Brinkley. Rice is a university. I know you went to Yuba College and couldn't graduate." (In fact, Young had graduated from Yuba Community College with an associate's degree, and later received a bachelor's degree from Chico State.) Brinkley also noted that Young's comments were made even though Young had not been present during his testimony. Brinkley continued to push back against Young throughout the hearing until the committee chairman threatened to have Brinkley removed.

== Critical reception ==
Stephen Ambrose called Brinkley "the best of the new generation of American historians." Brinkley and Ambrose had co-authored three books. Patrick Reardon of the Chicago Tribune called Brinkley America's "new past master." In addition, during the 2013 inauguration coverage, CNN referred to him as "a man who knows more about the presidency than just about any human being alive." In contrast, in 2006, historian Wilfred McClay in the New York Sun appraised Brinkley's scholarship as one that has failed to "put forward a single memorable idea, a single original analysis, or a single lapidary phrase." Similarly, author Bill Bryson characterized Brinkley as "a minor American academic and sometime critic whose powers of observation and generosity of spirit would fit comfortably into a proton and still leave room for an echo".

Garrett Graff wrote that Brinkley's books on the Second World War, The Boys of Pointe du Hoc; Voices of Valor and The World War Two Memorial, "changed forever how history will view the sacrifices of both the living and dead of World War Two.”

== Awards and honors ==
- In the spring of 2024, Brinkley was a fellow at the USC Center for the Political Future.
- In 2023, Brinkley won a Grammy Award for Fandango At The Wall In New York by Arturo O'Farrill and the Afro Latin Jazz Orchestra, featuring the Congra Patria Son Jarocho Collective (Grammy Award for Best Latin Jazz Album).
- In 2022, Brinkley was nominated for two Grammy Award categories; for co-producing two projects: Black Men Are Precious by Ethelbert Miller (Grammy Award for Best Spoken Word Poetry Album), and Fandango At The Wall In New York by Arturo O’Farrill and the Afro Latin Jazz Orchestra, featuring the Congra Patria Son Jarocho Collective (Grammy Award for Best Latin Jazz Album).
- On April 25, 2022, Brinkley received the Frank and Bethine Church Award for Public Service from the Frank Church Institute of Boise State University.
- In the summer of 2021 Brinkley was named the inaugural historian in residence at the Theodore Roosevelt Presidential Library.
- In 2021, the Garden Club of America awarded Brinkley the Frances K. Hutchinson Medal for his distinguished service to conservation efforts.
- In 2020, Brinkley won an Audie Award for his book American Moonshot, in the History/Biography category.
- In 2020, Brinkley's book American Moonshot: John F. Kennedy and the Great Space Race was given the Andrew Carnegie Medal for Excellence in Nonfiction (Longlist).
- in 2018 Brinkley was awarded an honorary degree of Doctor of Humane Letters from St Edwards University.
- In 2017, Brinkley was named Presidential Historian for New York Historical Society, helping to advance and articulate the mission, goals, and activities of the Historical Society's Presidency Project.
- In 2017, Brinkley won a Grammy Award Best Large Jazz Ensemble Album for co-producing Presidential Suite: Eight Variations on Freedom by the Ted Nash Big Band.
- In 2016 the U.S. Fish and Wildlife Service awarded him their Heritage Award.
- In 2015 he was awarded the Robin W. Winks Award for Enhancing Public Understanding of National Parks by the National Parks Conservation Association.
- Cronkite (2012), a biography of Walter Cronkite, received the Ann M. Sperber Prize for 2013.
- In 2009, Brinkley wrote the official inaugural book Barack Obama; The Official Inaugural Book with Tom Brokaw and U.S. Representative John Lewis and is an advisory board member for the Obama Presidency Oral History Project at Columbia University.
- Wilderness Warrior: Theodore Roosevelt and the Crusade for America (2009) received the National Outdoor Book Award in the History/Biography category 2009.
- Driven Patriot (1992), a biography of James Forrestal, received the Theodore and Franklin Roosevelt Naval History Prize.
- Brinkley received an honorary doctorate from Hofstra University at commencement in May 2012.
- In 2004, Brinkley was given the Humanist of the Year award by the Louisiana Endowment for the Humanities.
- In 1995 he was awarded the Stuart L. Bernath Lecture Prize from the Society of Historians of American Foreign Relations (Ceremony: Chicago, Illinois, April 1996).

== Personal life ==
Brinkley lives in Austin, Texas with his wife Anne and three children, Johnny, Benton, and Cassady. He is a member of the Century Association, the Council on Foreign Relations and Society of American Historians.

== Works ==
Title	Year	ISBN	Publisher	Subject matter	Interviews, presentations, and reviews	Comments
Original works
Driven Patriot: The Life and Times of James Forrestal	1992	ISBN 9780394577616	Alfred A. Knopf	James Forrestal		Written with Townsend Hoopes
Dean Acheson: The Cold War Years, 1953–71	1992	ISBN 9780300047738	Yale University Press	Dean Acheson	New York Times Book Review by Evan Thomas, November 8, 1992	
The Majic Bus: An American Odyssey	1993	ISBN 9780151556946	Harcourt	Describes Brinkley's experiences taking groups of college students on tours of historic sites around the U.S., and at least partly inspired the C-SPAN Bus program	Booknotes interview with Brinkley on The Majic Bus, April 18, 1993, C-SPAN	
Rise to Globalism: American Foreign Policy since 1938	1997	ISBN 9780140268317	Penguin Books	Foreign policy of the United States		Written with Stephen Ambrose
FDR and the Creation of the U.N.	1997	ISBN 9780300069303	Yale University Press	Franklin D. Roosevelt, History of the United Nations, Declaration by United Nations	Presentation by Hoopes and Brinkley on FDR and the Creation of the U.N., April 29, 1997, C-SPAN	Written with Townsend Hoopes
American Heritage History of the United States	1998	ISBN 9780670869664	Viking Press	History of the United States		
The Unfinished Presidency: Jimmy Carter's Journey Beyond the White House	1999	ISBN 9780670880065	Viking Press	Post-presidency of Jimmy Carter		
Witness to America: An Illustrated Documentary History of the United States from the Revolution to Today, Volume 1	1999	ISBN 9780062716118	HarperCollins	History of the United States	Presentation by Ambrose and Brinkley on Witness to America, October 30, 1999, C-SPAN	Written with Stephen Ambrose
Mine Eyes Have Seen the Glory: The Life of Rosa Parks	2000	ISBN 9780297607083	Weidenfeld & Nicolson	Rosa Parks	Presentation by Brinkley on Rosa Parks, June 7, 2000, C-SPAN	
The Mississippi and the Making of a Nation: From the Louisiana Purchase to Today	2002	ISBN 9780792269137	National Geographic Society	The Mississippi River	Presentation by Brinkley on The Mississippi and the Making of a Nation, October 30, 2002, C-SPAN	Written with Stephen Ambrose
Wheels for the World: Henry Ford, His Company, and a Century of Progress, 1903–2003	2003	ISBN 9781422354568	Viking Penguin	Henry Ford, The Ford Motor Company	Presentation by Brinkley on Wheels for the World, May 2, 2003, C-SPAN	
Tour of Duty: John Kerry and the Vietnam War	2004	ISBN 9780060565237	William Morrow and Company	Military career of John Kerry	Presentation by Brinkley on Tour of Duty, February 28, 2004, C-SPAN, Interview with Brinkley on Tour of Duty, October 11, 2004, C-SPAN	
Voices of Valor: D-Day, June 6, 1944	2004	ISBN 9780821228890	Bulfinch Press	D-Day		Written with Ronald J. Drez
The World War II Memorial: A Grateful Nation Remembers	2004	ISBN 9781588342102	Smithsonian Books	National World War II Memorial		
The Boys of Pointe du Hoc: Ronald Reagan, D-Day, and the U.S. Army 2nd Ranger Battalion	2005	ISBN 9780060565275	William Morrow and Company	D-Day, 2nd Ranger Battalion (United States), Ronald Reagan	Interview with Brinkley on The Boys of Pointe du Hoc, June 2, 2005, C-SPAN	
Parish Priest: Father Michael McGivney and American Catholicism	2006	ISBN 9780060776848	William Morrow and Company	Michael J. McGivney	Presentation by Brinkley on Parish Priest, January 19, 2006, C-SPAN	Written with Julie M. Fenster
The Great Deluge: Hurricane Katrina, New Orleans, and the Mississippi Gulf Coast	2006	ISBN 9780061124235	HarperCollins	Hurricane Katrina	Washington Journal interview with Brinkley on The Great Deluge, May 26, 2006, C-SPAN, New York Times Book Review by Michiko Kakutani, May 16, 2006; Presentation by Brinkley on The Great Deluge, June 7, 2006, C-SPAN, Presentation by Brinkley on The Great Deluge, September 30, 2006, C-SPAN	
Gerald R. Ford	2007	ISBN 9780805069099	Times Books	Gerald R. Ford		
The Wilderness Warrior: Theodore Roosevelt and the Crusade for America	2009	ISBN 9780060565282	HarperCollins	Environmental movement in the United States, Theodore Roosevelt	Part One of Q&A interview with Brinkley on The Wilderness Warrior, June 21, 2009, C-SPAN; Part Two of Q&A interview New York Times Book Review by Jonathan Rosen, August 6, 2009	
The Quiet World: Saving Alaska's Wilderness Kingdom, 1879–1960	2011	ISBN 9780062005960	HarperCollins		Interview with Brinkley on The Quiet World, October 23, 2011	
Cronkite	2012	ISBN 9780061374265	HarperCollins	Walter Cronkite	Q&A interview with Brinkley on Cronkite, June 3, 2012, C-SPAN, Interview with Brinkley on Cronkite, September 22, 2012, C-SPAN, Presentation by Brinkley on Cronkite, October 27, 2012, C-SPAN	
Rightful Heritage: Franklin D. Roosevelt and the Land of America	2016	ISBN 9780062089236	HarperCollins	Environmental movement in the United States, Franklin D. Roosevelt, Civilian Conservation Corps	Presentation by Brinkley on Rightful Heritage, March 12, 2016, C-SPAN, Presentation by Brinkley on Rightful Heritage, September 24, 2016, C-SPAN	
American Moonshot: John F. Kennedy and the Great Space Race	2019	ISBN 9780062655066	HarperCollins	Space Race, Apollo program	Washington Post Book Review by Thomas Oliphant, April 4, 2019; Q&A interview with Brinkley on American Moonshot, April 7, 2019	
Silent Spring Revolution: John F. Kennedy, Rachel Carson, Lyndon Johnson, Richard Nixon, and the Great Environmental Awakening	2022	ISBN 9780063212916	HarperCollins	Environmental movement in the United States, Rachel Carson, Silent Spring	Q&A interview with Brinkley on Silent Spring Revolution, November 20, 2022; Washington Post Book Review by Matthew Dallek, November 22, 2022	
As editor
The Proud Highway: Saga of a Desperate Southern Gentleman, 1955–1967	1997	ISBN 9780679406952	Villard	Hunter S. Thompson		ed. with Hunter S. Thompson
Fear and Loathing in America: the Brutal Odyssey of an Outlaw Journalist, 1968–1976	2000	ISBN 9780684873152	Simon & Schuster	Hunter S. Thompson		ed. with Hunter S. Thompson
Windblown World: The Journals of Jack Kerouac, 1947–1954	2004	ISBN 9780670033416	Viking Press	Jack Kerouac		
The Reagan Diaries	2007	ISBN 9781616795580	HarperCollins	Ronald Reagan	Interview with Brinkley on The Reagan Diaries, April 27, 2007, C-SPAN, Interview with Brinkley on The Reagan Diaries, June 9, 2007, C-SPAN	
Jack Kerouac Road Novels 1957–1960	2007	ISBN 9781598530124	Library of America	Jack Kerouac, On the Road, The Dharma Bums, The Subterraneans, Tristessa, Lonesome Traveler		
The Notes: Ronald Reagan's Private Collection of Stories and Wisdom	2011	ISBN 9780062065131	HarperCollins	Ronald Reagan		
The Nixon Tapes: 1971–1972	2014	ISBN 9780544274150	Houghton Mifflin Harcourt	Nixon White House tapes	Gaddis, John Lewis. "Book Review: 'The Nixon Tapes' by Douglas Brinkley and Luke A. Nichter." The Wall Street Journal, July 25, 2014.	ed. with Luke A. Nichter
The Nixon Tapes: 1973	2015	ISBN 9780544610538	Houghton Mifflin Harcourt	Nixon White House tapes	Frankel, Max. "‘The Nixon Tapes: 1973,’ Edited by Douglas Brinkley and Luke A. Nichter." The New York Times, Sunday Book Review, Oct. 19, 2015.	ed. with Luke A. Nichter
