= List of general fraternities =

A fraternity or fraternal organization is an organized society for a common purpose or interest. They typically are composed of men, though some may include women. Service clubs, lineage societies, and secret societies are among the fraternal organizations listed here. College fraternities and sororities appear in the List of social fraternities and sororities. Fraternal benefit societies are included in List of friendly and benevolent societies.

== International ==
These are fraternal organizations that operate internationally.

=== Fraternal orders ===
==== Christian Orders ====
===== Interdenominational/Ecumenical =====
- International Order of the King's Daughters and Sons

===== Roman Catholic =====
- International Alliance of Catholic Knights
- Knights of Columbus
  - Columbian Squires
  - Squire Roses
- Knights of Marshall
- Knights of Peter Claver
- Knights of St. John International
- Order of Alhambra

===== Protestant =====
- Orange Order

==== Druids ====
- Ancient Order of Druids
- Order of Druids
- United Ancient Order of Druids

==== Freemasonry ====
- Freemasonry
  - DeMolay International
  - Order of the Amaranth
  - Order of the Eastern Star
  - Prince Hall Freemasonry
    - Prince Hall Order of the Eastern Star
  - Scottish Rite
  - Shriners
  - York Rite

==== Gardeners ====
- Order of Free Gardeners

==== Odd Fellows ====
- Odd Fellows
  - Independent Order of Oddfellows Manchester Unity
  - International Association of Rebekah Assemblies

==== Knights Of Pythias ====
- Knights of Pythias
  - Dramatic Order of the Knights of Khorassan
- Knights of Pythias of North America, South America, Europe, Asia, Africa and Australia
- Pythian Sisters

==== Temperance ====
- Independent Order of Rechabites (IOR)
- Templars of Honor and Temperance

==== Other fraternal orders ====
- Ancient Mystical Order Rosae Crucis
- Ancient Order of Hibernians
- Concatenated Order of Hoo-Hoo
- Fraternal Order of Moai
- Gyro International
- Knights of the Maccabees
- Loyal Order of Moose
- Royal Antediluvian Order of Buffaloes
- Sons of Norway
- Vasa Order of America

== Australia ==
Fraternities or lodges were an important part of Australian society in the 19th and the first half of the 20th century. After the Second World War, they were gradually replaced by "service clubs", such as Lions, Apex and Rotary. By the end of the 20th century, most fraternities had been wound up except for the Freemasons and a few lodges of the Buffaloes. Many fraternities also offered insurance to their members and as membership declined, these operations were either combined with other non profit insurance companies or sold with the proceeds being distributed to charitable causes.

The reasons for their decline probably have something to do with their male only membership, generational change and bemusement at secretive rites and rituals. All fraternities had different rules and rites, but they all appear to have been complex. The service clubs that succeeded the fraternities also operated as social networks and did fairly similar charitable work. No general history has been written, but some of the many lodges that operate in the state of Victoria are:

- Freemasons, including United Grand Lodge of New South Wales and the Australian Capital Territory
- Knights of the Southern Cross
- Independent Order of Rechabites

== Canada ==
- Beta Sigma Phi, non-collegiate sorority
- Independent Order of Odd Fellows
  - Ladies of the Orient (LOTO)
- Loyal Order of Moose
- Orange Order in Canada
- Order of Alhambra
- Pancretan Association of America
- Ukrainian National Association

== Europe ==
=== France ===
- Swedenborg Rite

=== Denmark ===
- Independent Order of Odd Fellows

=== Republic of Ireland ===
- Knights of Saint Columbanus

=== Sweden ===
- Independent Order of Odd Fellows
- Swedish Order of Freemasons
- Samfundet SHT

=== United Kingdom ===
- Apprentice Boys of Derry
- Grand United Order of Oddfellows
- Grand Order of Water Rats
- Independent Orange Order
- Independent Order of Oddfellows Manchester Unity Friendly Society
- Knights of St Columba
- Royal Antediluvian Order of Buffaloes
- Royal Arch Purple
- Royal Black Institution

== South Africa ==
- Afrikaner Broederbond
- Freemasonry in South Africa

== United States ==
=== Ethnic orders ===
==== African American orders ====
- Afro-American Sons and Daughters
- Grand United Order of Odd Fellows in America
  - Household of Ruth
- Improved Benevolent and Protective Order of Elks of the World
- Independent Order of St. Luke
- International Order of Twelve Knights and Daughters of Tabor
- Knights of Peter Claver
- Knights of Pythias of North America, South America, Europe, Asia, Africa and Australia
  - Order of Calanthe
- Omicron Epsilon Pi, non-collegiac lesbians and lesbians of color
- Prince Hall Freemasonry
  - Prince Hall Order of the Eastern Star
  - Heroines of Jericho

==== European cultural orders ====
- American Hellenic Educational Progressive Association
- American Slovenian Catholic Union
- Ancient Order of Hibernians
- Danish Brotherhood in America
- Emerald Society
- Independent Order of Vikings
- Knights of Vartan
- Knights of Equity
- Pancretan Association of America
- Pan-Icarian Brotherhood
- Order Sons of Italy in America
- Sons of Norway
- Ukrainian National Association
- Vasa Order of America

=== General fraternal orders ===
- Benevolent and Protective Order of Elks
- Benevolent and Protective Order of Keglers
- Beta Sigma Phi, non-collegiate sorority
- E Clampus Vitus
- Fraternal Order of Eagles
- Fraternal Order of Moai
- Fraternal Order Orioles
- Honorable Order of the Blue Goose, International
- Improved Order of Heptasophs
- Improved Order of Red Men
  - Degree of Pocahontas
- Independent Order of Odd Fellows (aka Odd Fellows)
  - Ancient Mystic Order of Samaritans (AMOS)
  - Ladies of the Orient (LOTO)
- Junior Order of United American Mechanics
- Knights of Columbus
- Knights of the Globe
- Knights of the Golden Eagle
- Loyal Order of Moose
- Military Order of the Serpent
- Native Sons of the Golden West
- Order of Alhambra
- Order of Heptasophs
- Order of Owls
- Patriotic Order Sons of America
- Rascals, Rogues, and Rapscallions
- Tribe of Ben-Hur

== See also ==
- Benefit society
- Fraternal order
- List of friendly and benefit societies
- List of Masonic Grand Lodges
- List of North American ethnic and religious fraternal orders
- List of North American fraternal orders
- List of social fraternities
- List of social sororities and women's fraternities
- Secret society
- Service club
- Social club
