= Knights of the Southern Cross (New Zealand) =

- Abbreviation: KSC or KSCNZ
- Formation: 1922
- Type: Catholic fraternal service
- Supreme Knight: Neil Rutherford

The Knights of the Southern Cross (New Zealand) (“KSCNZ”) is a fraternal order of Catholic men committed to promoting the Christian way of life. It is organised in 18 branches throughout the six dioceses of New Zealand. The order is an incorporated society.

Membership is open to all Roman Catholic males in good standing at least 18 years of age or older.

Through the International Alliance of Catholic Knights, the Knights of the Southern Cross (New Zealand) are associated with the Knights of the Southern Cross (Australia), the Knights of Columbus, the Knights of Saint Columbanus, the Knights of Da Gama and the Knights of Saint Columba.

The National Secretariat is in Wellington.
