= Military Order of the Serpent =

American veterans fraternity and secret society

- MOS
- Founded: January 1, 1904; 122 years ago Cleveland, Ohio
- Type: Fraternal order
- Affiliation: United Spanish War Veterans
- Status: Defunct
- Emphasis: Veterans
- Scope: National
- Colors: Green, Purple and Gold
- Symbol: Serpent
- Chapters: 0 active
- Nickname: Snaix
- Headquarters: Memorial Hall, Topeka, Kansas United States

Military Order of the Serpent (acronym MOS; nickname, Snaix; established 1904) was an American secret society and veterans' fraternity organized in 1904, and incorporated on August 6, 1907. The MOS received official recognition by the United Spanish War Veterans (USWV) at the Los Angeles encampment. It became the humorous branch of the USWV, as devotion to the principles and objectives of USWV did not prevent a belief in humor.

The MOS was the outgrowth of ideas by Walter Scott MacAaron (1877–1941), Col. Fred S. Fanning (1863–1940), Col. John Parker, and others. It took its basis from the ancient rites observed by the several Filipino tribes and the ordeals passed thru by the Gilmore Party when captured by the native Filipinos. The MOS was said to be adopted from a clandestine Masonry formed by Filipinos in 1871, at Cavite. Known as the Katipunan Society, this was a revolutionary organization with headquarters in the Biak-na-Bato Cave, where Emilio Aguinaldo and his headsmen signed the Spanish treaty.

== Preceding events ==
The Order of the Serpent was originally formed in the Philippine Islands. It was built upon the history and traditions of a Filipino revolutionary organization known as the "Katipunan", who worshiped the snake as their Deity and lived by levying tribute much in the same manner as the Black Hand. The members of the tribe had a triangle branded on their left breast with a "K." in each corner, and a sunburst in the center. To become a member, the native had, in addition to his oath of allegiance, submit to an odd ceremony, concluded by signing his name with the blood from three cuts in the shape of a triangle onto his left arm. This becoming known, the troops, in 1899, examined every native captured to determine if he had the scar and so secured the secrets of the society.

During the Philippine insurrection, Walter McAron, who became Grand Gu Gu Grandississimo (GGG) of the Military Order of the Serpent (MOS), together with 15 other American soldiers, were captured by the Katipunan, so that they are well acquainted with the customs and manners and traditions of the Katipunan organization. This Order was introduced into the United States and subordinate bodies were organized in many of the States. One of the spectacular features was the parade of members as Snakes in costumes, representing every tribe in islands of the Philippines, from the Tagalog to the Iggorotto. The Katipunan, the Great Snake, headed the smaller ones, and he inserted the royal sting of the jungle for those wishing to learn the mysteries of the Order when the initiates were instructed.

== History ==
The Military Order of the Serpent aimed to present in its work one of the Filipino societies, Order of the Serpent, which has sworn undying hatred of the Americans and had devoted its members to the service of Katipunan.

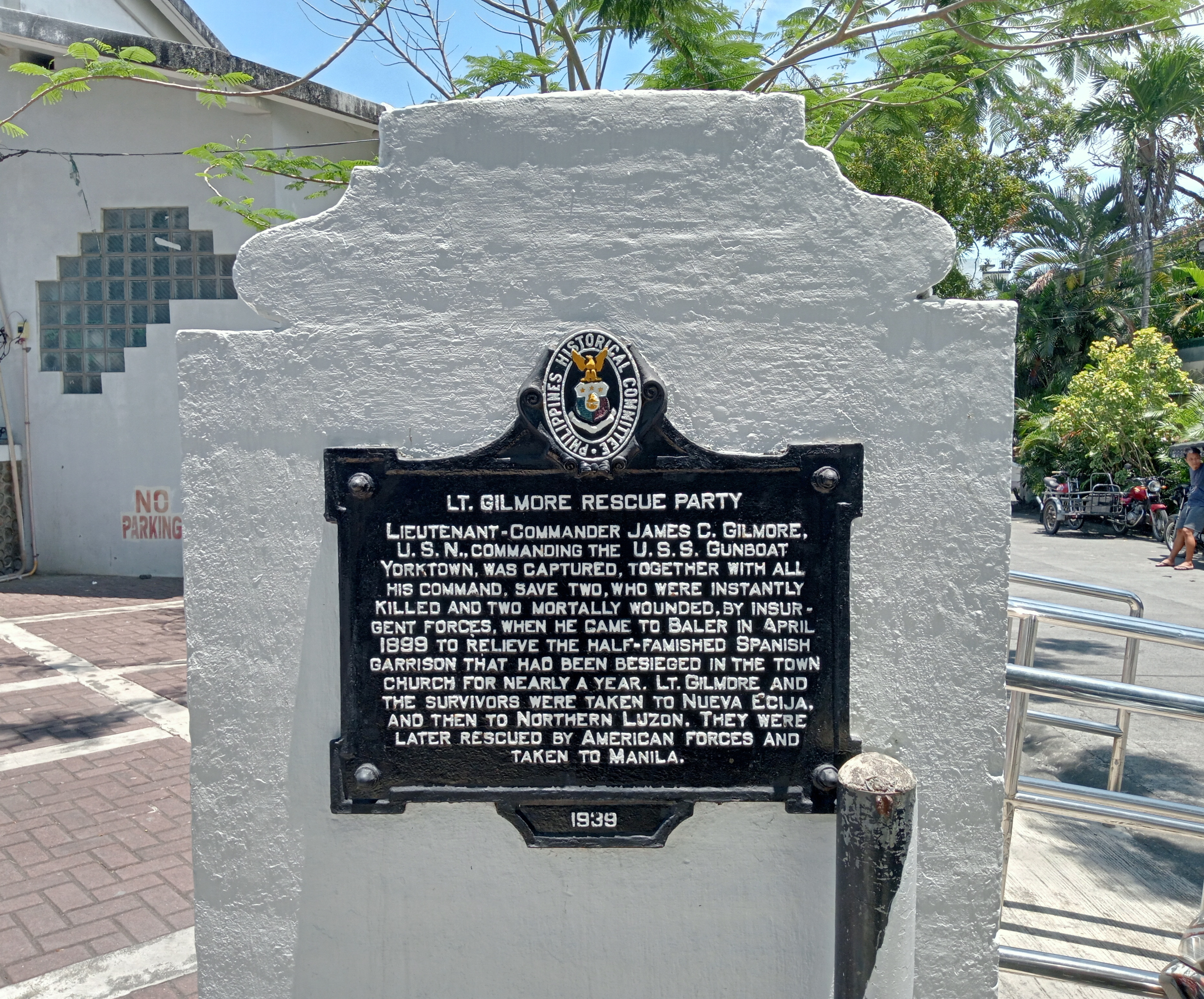
Lt. Gilmore Rescue Party historical marker

As was generally known, the ritual of the Spanish War Veterans (SWV), like that of its successor, the USWV, did not contain much levity. In the autumn of 1903, Capt. Frederick Mason Fanning was elected Department Commander of Ohio SWV and chose Sydney Aaron Phillips (1860–1937) as his Adjutant General. At the time, he promised Ohio a clean side degree to stimulate interest in the depleting SWV. The Gilmore Party had just been rescued from the Philippines to the joy of the U.S., and public prints were filled with the strange adventures of that party among the indigenous peoples of the Philippines.

The Filipinos Society of Katipunan came prominently to the SWV's attention and after experimenting with various side degrees offered by costume houses, which proved to be either trifling, dull, or immoral, the SWV determined to establish the MOS as a side degree of the SWV, which later consolidated into the USWV. The extensive knowledge of native customs obtained from those who served, principally of the 22nd Infantry, U. S. A., together with some of the organizers' own knowledge, helped in writing up a ritual. The degree was formally introduced to the members of the SWV of Cleveland on January 1, 1904. About 52 delegates attended the meeting from various camps all over the state. From that time on, the Snake became a feature of USWV camps in Ohio and was always worked at Department Encampment.

When the organizers learned that a civilian reporter was claiming some credit for the organization of the Order, Capt. Fanning and a chosen group of faithful Snakes incorporated it in 1907, the Captain retiring from his position at the head of it and giving place to Captain Charles E. Stroud, of Sandusky, Ohio, who served until the last Supreme Convention at Boston, when Phillips was elected Supreme Gu Gu Grandississimo.

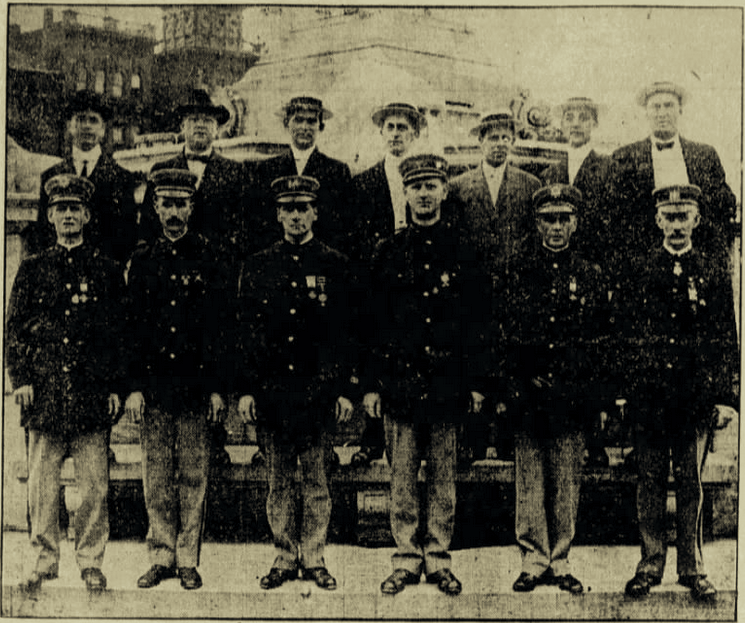
MOS degree team (Buffalo, New York, 1913)

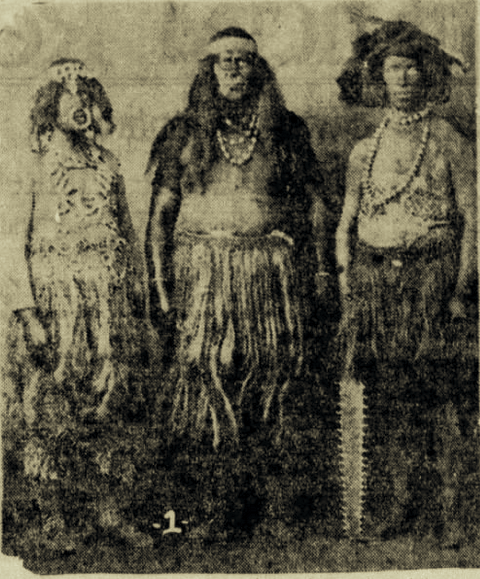
MOS officers, S. M. Williams, J. F. Henja, Wm. Reber (l-r) (Springfield, Ohio, 1926)

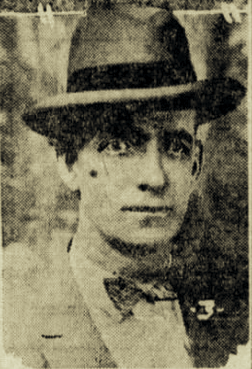
Ellis E. Deckey, Grand Gu Gu Grandississimo (1926)

The Order was general throughout Ohio, and in 1913, at Cedar Point, was worked on by many at the National Encampment, while at Boston in 1914, 233 applicants were inoculated with the Sacred Virus.

By 1914, the Order existed in 22 States.

== Membership ==
The regulations governing membership were identical to those of the USWV. Only those who were already members in good standing of that body were eligible to obtain or retain membership in the MOS. Membership was open to U.S. military veterans who had seen foreign service.

== Headquarters and lairs ==
The organization was chartered by the State of Ohio and extended to nearly every department of the USWV. The constituent bodies of this organization were a national body known as the Supreme Lair of the United States, the Military Order of the Serpent, and State Organizations known as Grand Lairs, each Grand Lair being designated by the name of the state, territory or possession in which it existed.

The Grand Lair of Ohio, for several years, held the honors of having the most active lairs and largest membership, but through lack of interest, lost that honor for a time. In 1907, the leader of the Order, the Grand Junta, maintained an address at Defiance, Ohio. By 1931, the permanent administrative headquarters were located Memorial Hall, Topeka, Kansas.

== Organization ==
The organization consisted of a Supreme Lair of the U. S., which was much like the National Encampment USWV in its organization and operation. Departments were organized into Grand Lairs. The Grand Lair was the unit of work and was supposed to put on the work at Department Encampment or at the will of the Grand Junta of the department. Local Lairs operate under Rits of Dispension (so-called) and have the power to initiate not to exceed 50 percent of the local USWV membership in any calendar year.

The organization was non-partisan and non-sectarian. Its purposes were the maintenance of a secret society to perpetuate memories of the Spanish–American War, the incident struggle in the Philippines, the China Relief Expedition, and for literary purposes connected with these wars of the U.S.

The Preamble to its constitution stated: "We the members of the United Spanish War Veterans who have seen the mystic light diffused by the weird and awful Khatee Puna even the Great Snake who haunts the Jungle, desiring to more firmly establish good fellowship among our comrades, do ordain and establish this Constitution for the Military Order of the Serpent."

== Administration and symbols ==
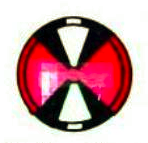
Lapel insignia

The objective of the MOS was: "To Make Life More Pleasant and Ourselves More Useful to USWV, All Sons of USWV, and the Rest of Humanity." The emblem of the order was a Serpent with a triangle and other symbols. The emblem carried at a parade in Boston, was said to measure 150 feet (46 m) in length. Its colors were green and purple, with gold accents. Its member's cap was green and featured a gold serpent and purple tassels on the top. Its garb was a white costume designed to represent Filipino natives who had become civilized.

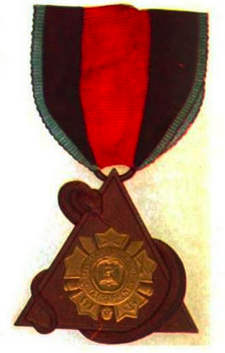
Ribbon and medal

Initially, the MOS had two degrees, Khattee Puna (first degree), and the Bayana (second degree). Subsequently, there were three degrees, the Khatee Puna (first degree), Kaul (second degree), and Bayani (third degree). The badge of the Order (Khatapunan and Kaul degree badges) was a Filipino cross with the emblems of the American Service deposed on its arms; center and spaces between the arms of cross bear the symbols of the Katipunan.

Comparison of MOS degrees to the Katipunan system:

Katipunan color designations:

- Katipon. First-degree members. Other symbols: Black hood, revolver, and/or bolo.
- Kawal. Second-degree members. Other symbols: green ribboned medallion with Malayan K inscription.
- Bayani. Third-degree members. Other symbols: Red hood and sash, with green borders.

The titles of its office were odd. The leader of the Order was the Grand Junta, or Grand Gu Gu Grandississimo. Other titles associated with the order included: Thrice Infamous Inferior Grand Gu Gu, Grand Datto, Grand Lord High Keeper of the Sacred Amphora, Keeper of the Ophidian, Chief Ladrone, Ungodly Villain, Thrice Dulcat Yawler of the Jungle, the Insidious thumper of the Sanctified Sheep-Hide, Lord High compellor of the Sacred Bull Cart, Dog Robber of the Unhallowed Loat, and Depraved Pangula.

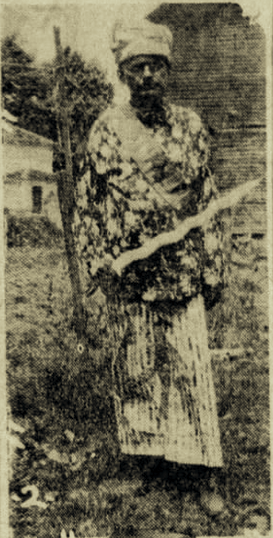
Thomas M. Stalford, editor & publisher, The Hiker (1926)

The official organ, The Hiker, was a bi-monthly publication. Thomas M. Stalford was the editor & publisher.

== Notable people ==
=== Members ===
John Henry Parker

=== Supreme Gu Gu Grandississimos ===
- Henry Escarraz
- Frederick M. Fanning
- Walter Scott MacAaron
- George Meredith
- Sydney Aaron Phillips
- E. W. Simmons
- Walter E. Steele
- Paul Stobbe
- Charles Stroud

== See also ==
- Fraternal order
- List of general fraternities
