= Knights of the Southern Cross =

Catholic fraternal order in Australia

- Abbreviation: KSC
- Formation: 1919
- Type: Catholic fraternal service
- Headquarters: PO Box 216, Campbell, ACT, Australia, 2612
- Supreme Knight: Brian Cooper
- Key people: Patrick Minahan and Joseph Lynch
- Website: ksca.org.au

The Knights of the Southern Cross (KSC) is a Catholic fraternal order committed to promoting the Christian way of life throughout Australia.

The Order was founded in Sydney in 1919 with the approval of the Catholic Bishops of Australia. When it was formed, the purpose of the organisation was correcting discrimination against Catholics, particularly in employment.

It merged with its Victorian counterpart, the Knights of St. Francis Xavier, in 1922, and branches were formed the same year in Queensland, South Australia, Western Australia and in New Zealand. In 1923, a branch was established in Tasmania.

Branches operate in many Catholic parishes throughout Australia, and membership is open to Catholic men over the age of 18.

St. Mary MacKillop is patron saint of the Knights of the Southern Cross.

The order also established the non-profit aged care organisation, Southern Cross Care.

== The objects of the order ==
The Order's objectives are;

- To promote the advancement of Australia
- To foster the Christian way of life throughout the nation
- To promote the welfare of members of the Order and their families
- To encourage spiritual, social and intellectual activities amongst members of the Order
- To conduct and support educational, charitable, religious and social welfare work

== History ==
The Order was founded in 1919 in Sydney at a time when Catholics were regarded with suspicion by the Protestant majority in Australia. The two co-founders were Patrick Minahan, a boot manufacturer and member of the NSW Legislative Assembly, and Joseph Lynch, a school inspector. Within a year of its establishment over 1,000 men had joined the order from every state in Australia and a national council was established to oversee the organisation.

In the beginning it served to assist Catholic servicemen returned from the First World War in finding employment, and also to defend the rights and interests of the Catholic Church in Australia – a mission which it continues to promote today. It played a part in ceremonial occasions, such as the 1928 International Eucharistic Congress in Sydney.

In the 1930s and 1940s, the Knights of the Southern Cross played a key role in opposing communism in the labour movement, via its "secret subsidiary" the Ketteler Guild (named after Wilhelm Emmanuel von Ketteler). The Knights funded anti-communist publications and radio campaigns, as well as the dissemination of anti-communist propaganda in trade unions. Many individual members were associated with B. A. Santamaria's Catholic Social Studies Movement.

The organisation has remained especially strong in South Australia. In 1968, it established Southern Cross Homes (now Southern Cross Care), building its first retirement village in the Adelaide suburb of Croydon.

== International Alliance of Catholic Knights ==
Through the International Alliance of Catholic Knights, the Knights of the Southern Cross are associated with the Knights of Columbus, the Knights of St Columbanus, the Knights of Da Gama, the Knights of Peter Claver, the Knights of the Southern Cross (New Zealand) and the Knights of Saint Columba.
