= Heptasophs =

The Heptasophs was the name of two interrelated fraternal orders based in New Orleans

- Order of Heptasophs
- Improved Order of Heptasophs, founded as a split from the above group
