= United Spanish War Veterans =

1904-1998 American veterans organization

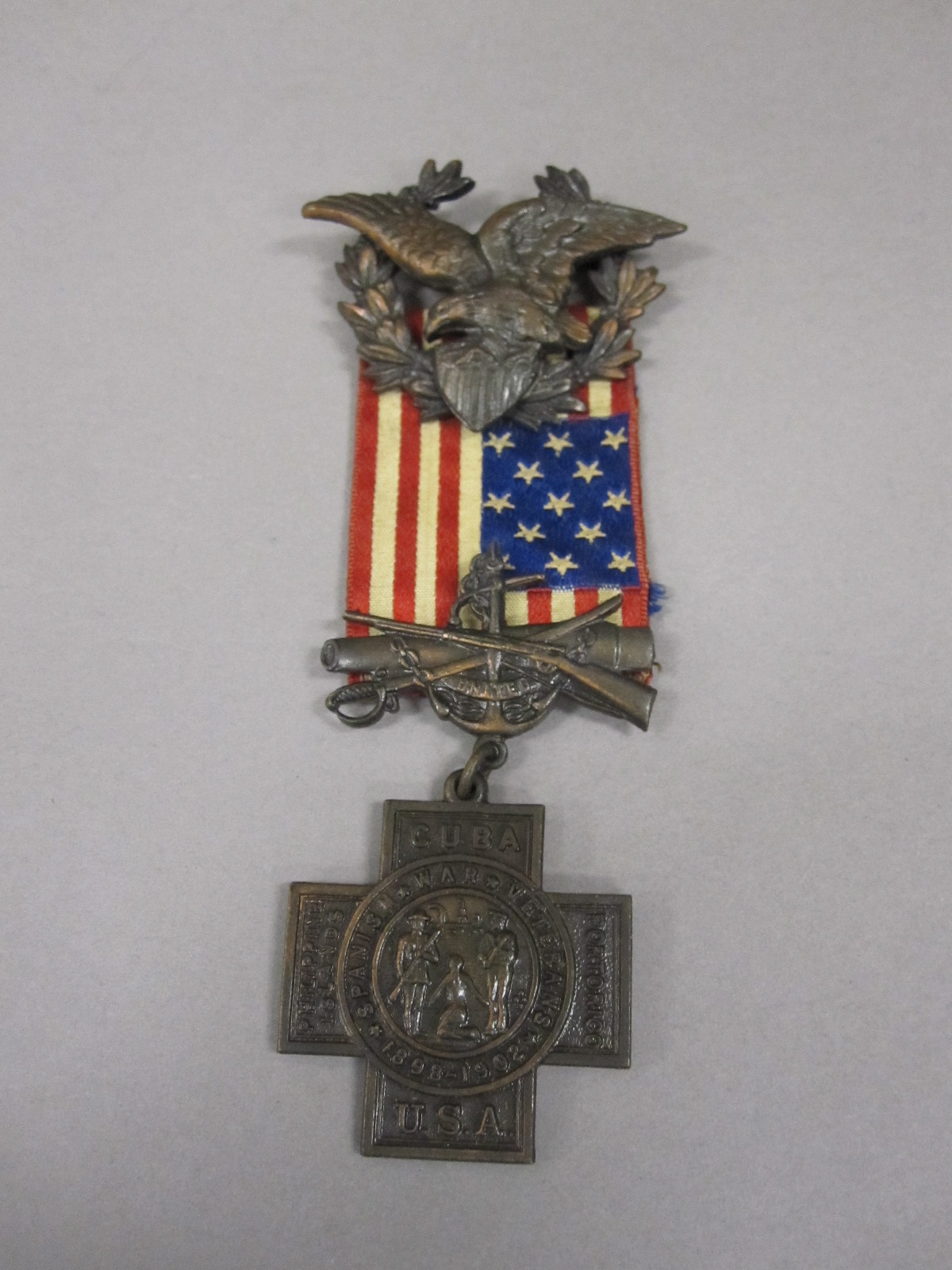
USWV membership medal

The United Spanish War Veterans was an American veterans' organization which consisted of veterans of the Spanish–American War, Philippine–American War and China Relief Expedition.

== Origins ==
Soon after the Spanish–American War ended, in early 1899, discharged veterans formed fraternal societies to keep in touch with their former comrades. These included the Spanish War Veterans, the Spanish–American War Veterans, the Servicemen of the Spanish War, American Veterans of Foreign Service, the Army of the Philippines, the Veteran Army of the Philippines, the Legion of Spanish War Veterans and other smaller organizations.

At the start of the 20th century, these groups began to merge. In 1904, the three largest groups—the Spanish War Veterans, the Spanish–American War Veterans and the Servicemen of the Spanish War—joined to form the United Spanish War Veterans. They became the largest and most influential of the Spanish–American War societies.

In 1906, the Legion of Spanish War Veterans merged with the United Spanish War Veterans. The Legion existed in Rhode Island, Massachusetts and New Hampshire. The President of the Legion's Rhode Island chapter was Mrs Ellen V. Meehan during the 1930s; her husband was Cpl. James Arthur Meehan, who served in the Spanish war with the Rhode Island Volunteer Infantry.

In 1908, the Veteran Army of the Philippines, composed of soldiers, sailors and Marines who had served in the Philippine Islands, also merged with the United Spanish War Veterans.

== Membership ==
The membership of United Spanish War Veterans thus consisted of veterans of three distinct wars:

- Spanish–American War – April 1898 to February 1899 (The fighting had ended by July 1898, but the Treaty of Peace was not signed until February 6, 1899.)
- Philippine–American War. February 1899 to July 1902 (This was a conflict with Filipinos who refused to accept the annexation of the islands by the United States. President Theodore Roosevelt declared the conflict at an end on July 4, 1902, though violence among Moro tribesmen continued until 1913.)
- Chinese Relief Expedition. 1900 to 1901. (Commonly called "The Boxer Rebellion," the veterans who had served in it were placed with the Spanish War and Philippine Insurrection veterans on the federal government pension bills. The “Boxer Rebellion” veterans were accepted into the USWV in the early 1920s.)

== End ==
The United Spanish War Veterans existed until 1992, when the last member, Nathan E. Cook, died at age 106 at the Carl T. Hayden VA Medical Center in Phoenix, Arizona. He is often incorrectly called the last surviving veteran of the Spanish–American War. In fact, Cook was a veteran of the Philippine Insurrection of 1899–1902. He enlisted in the US Navy in 1901 at the age of sixteen. During the last years of The United Spanish War Veterans existence members of another organization called The Sons of Spanish American War Veterans founded in 1927 took up "acting" officer roles and ran the organizations chapters as well as their own. The United Spanish War Veterans chapter meetings were held between 1992 and 1998 without any living members after the death of Nathan E. Cook.

== See also ==
- Military Order of the Serpent, est. 1904; humorous branch of the USWV
