= Blue goose =

Blue goose or Blue Goose may refer to:

- Blue Goose, a presidential lectern of the United States
- Snow goose, a North American species of goose
- Blue-winged goose, an Ethiopian goose
- Blue Goose Records
- Honorable Order of the Blue Goose, International, a fraternal and charitable organization
- A nickname of the 4-6-4 locomotive leading the Chief passenger train of the Atchison, Topeka and Santa Fe Railway
- A nickname of the personal Mercedes-Benz 540K of Hermann Goering
- Common nickname for North Central Airlines based on their logo painted on the tails of their aircraft.
- Nickname for patrol vehicles of the Michigan State Police
