= Rascals, Rogues, and Rapscallions =

American fraternal society devoted to scholarly research

- Founded: February 3, 1989; 37 years ago Manhattan, New York City, New York
- Type: Social and literary
- Affiliation: Independence
- Status: Active
- Scope: Regional
- Publication: The Megaphone
- Chapters: 2 active
- Headquarters: PO Box 211; Bryn Athyn, Pennsylvania 19009; United States
- Website: www.ephorate.org

The Rascals, Rogues, and Rapscallions is a cigar-friendly men's fraternal society devoted to scholarly research on obscure topics. Dubbed "America's Most Interesting Men's Club", the society meets for quarterly dinner meetings at which one or more members of the society present findings on either their current research projects or a topic that had been assigned to them by the group.

== History ==
Rascals, Rogues, and Rapscallions first met on February 3, 1989, at Harvey's Chelsea Restaurant in Manhattan, New York City, New York. Its founders were nine men that were invited by Dan Morrison. The fraternity is devoted to exploration and discovery through scholarly research.

When Morrison moved to Pittsburgh to pursue a Ph.D. at the University of Pittsburgh, he decided to recreate the fraternity there. After finding some recruits, the fraternity was formalized with a constitution and charter.

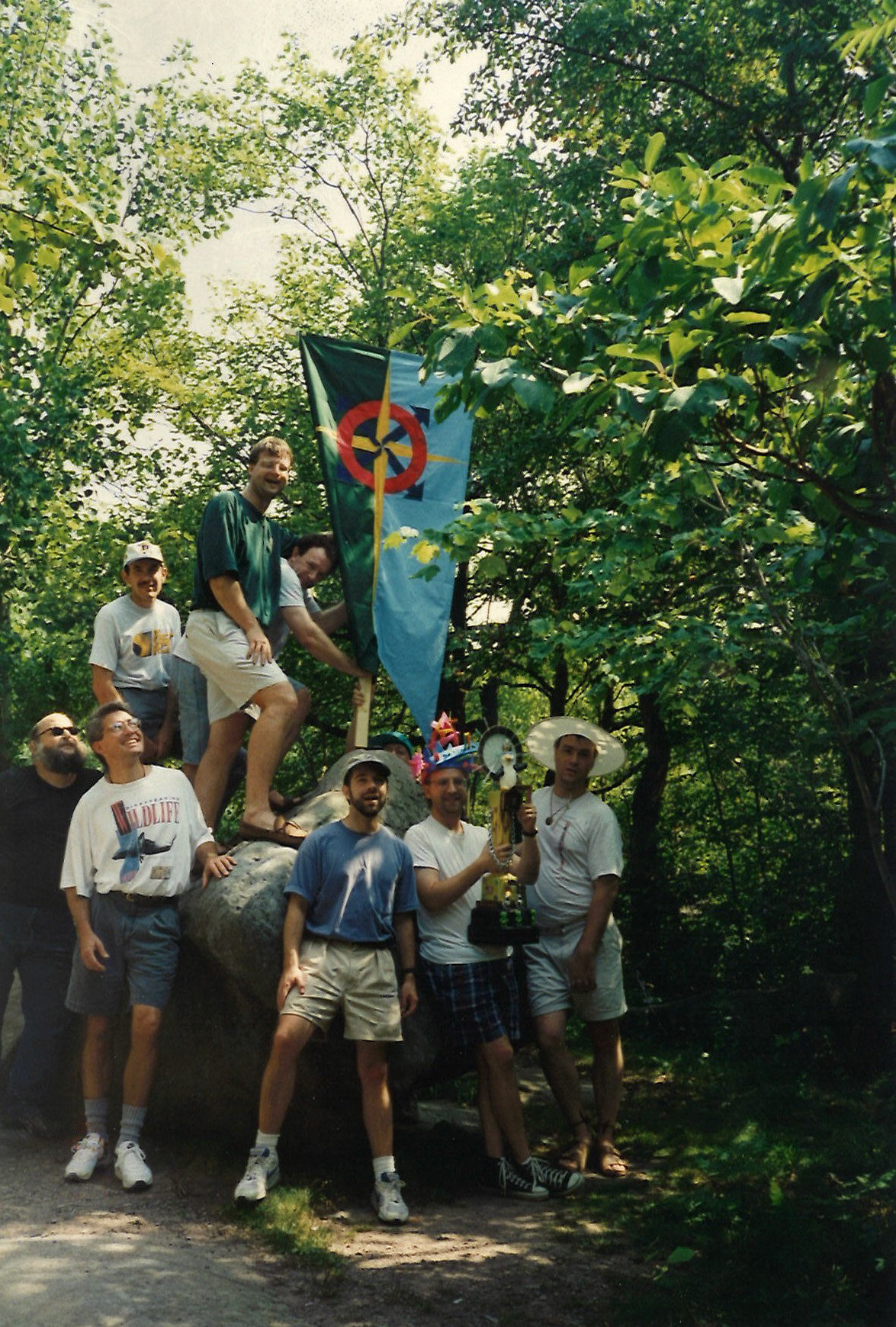
Pittsburgh Lair raises the flag over the highest point in Pennsylvania.

Lair No. 1 was chartered on March 5, 1994 in Pittsburgh, Pennsylvania. Lair No. 2 was chartered in 1996 in Roanoke, Virginia two professors at Hollins University, one being the brother of a member of Lair No. 1. This was followed by Lair No. 3 in 2000 in Doylestown, Pennsylvania. This group formed after Morrison moved to Doylestown and included some of the original Manhattan members.

Each chapter holds quarterly meetings, consisting of dinner and a research presentation. Presentations that fall into one of four categories: Rascal Challenge, Rogue Challenge, Mass Challenge, or Research Report. In addition to its regular meetings, which are for men only, chapters host an annual ball, to which women are welcome, and at which presentations of the Landgraf medal and Rascal 'o the Year trophy are made.

The fraternity's governing body is its board of trustees that is called The Ephorate. Its publication is The Megaphone, first published in November 1994. Its headquarters is in Bryn Athyn, Pennsylvania.

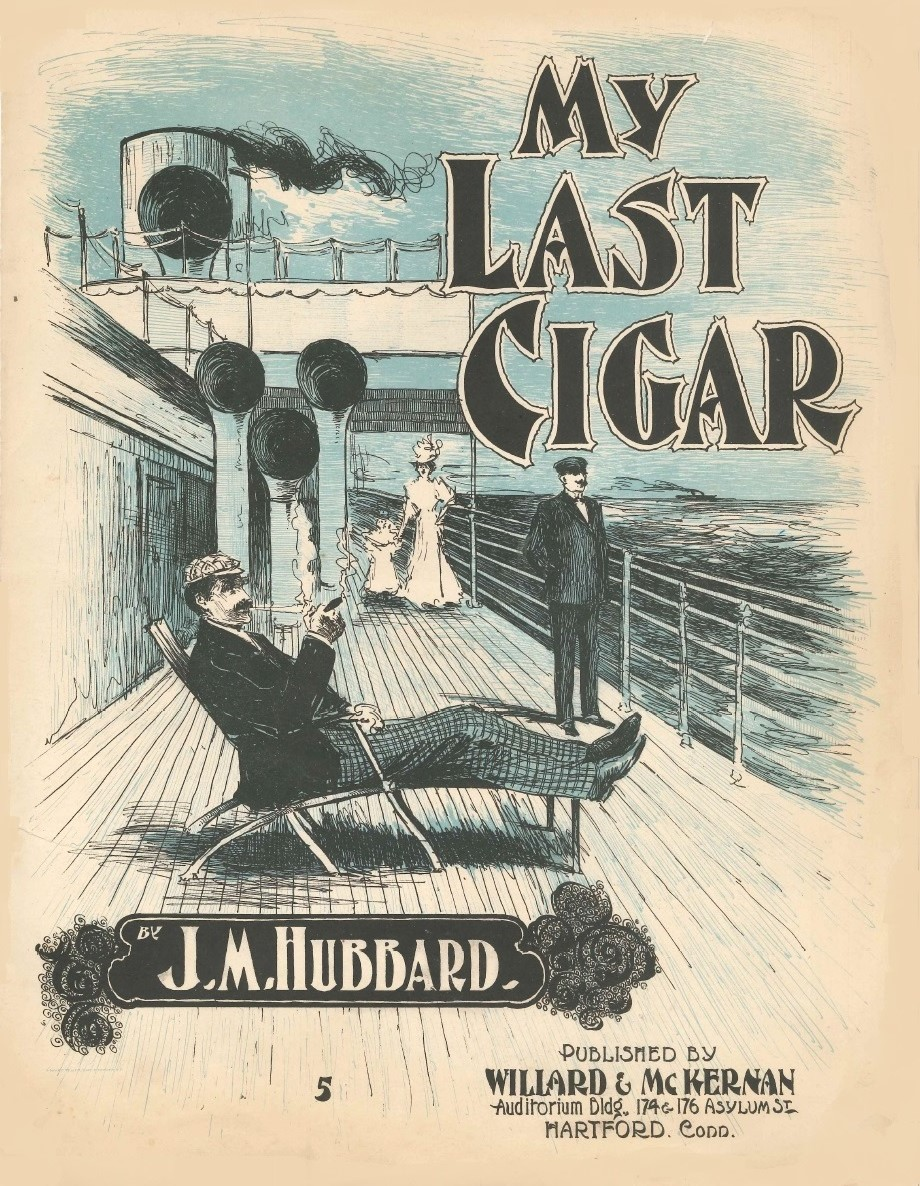
"My Last Cigar" is sung at every meeting of the RR&R

== Symbols and traditions ==
Before research presentations, its members sing "Interesting Thing" the society's theme song, composed by Greg Scheer. After the presentation, the men sing "My Last Cigar," a song attributed to James Maurice Hubbard.

=== Cigars ===
Cigars are a regular part of all of the society's meetings. In the early days of society, public restaurants had rooms set aside for parties that wished to smoke. Since that time, however, increasingly restrictive legislation has driven the Rascals, Rogues, and Rapscallions from public restaurants to private clubs, such as the Moose Lodge or the Maennerchor Society, where smoking is permitted. Each Lair (chapter) elects a Keeper of the Humidor who provides unusual cigars at each meeting.

Meetings closes with a singing of "My Last Cigar," a sentimental ballad popular in the late 19th century. This ballad, and its author/composer, have been the subject of considerable RR&R research, including, most recently, "Second-Hand Smoke: James Maurice Hubbard and the Search for the Elusive Author and Composer of America’s Second Favorite Song" by Daniel Paul Morrison.

Pennsylvania State Poet Samuel John Hazo wrote and presented "When the Evening Gets Down to Cigars" to the Rascals, Rogues, and Rapscallions at the December 4, 1993 meeting of the Pittsburgh Lair, a meeting dedicated to the life and times of Moses F. Gale, the inventor of a gas-fired cigar lighter. In 2023, Prof. Dr. Alan Blum of the University of Alabama' Center for Tobacco and Society featured the society and the song My Last Cigar which they sing at their meetings.

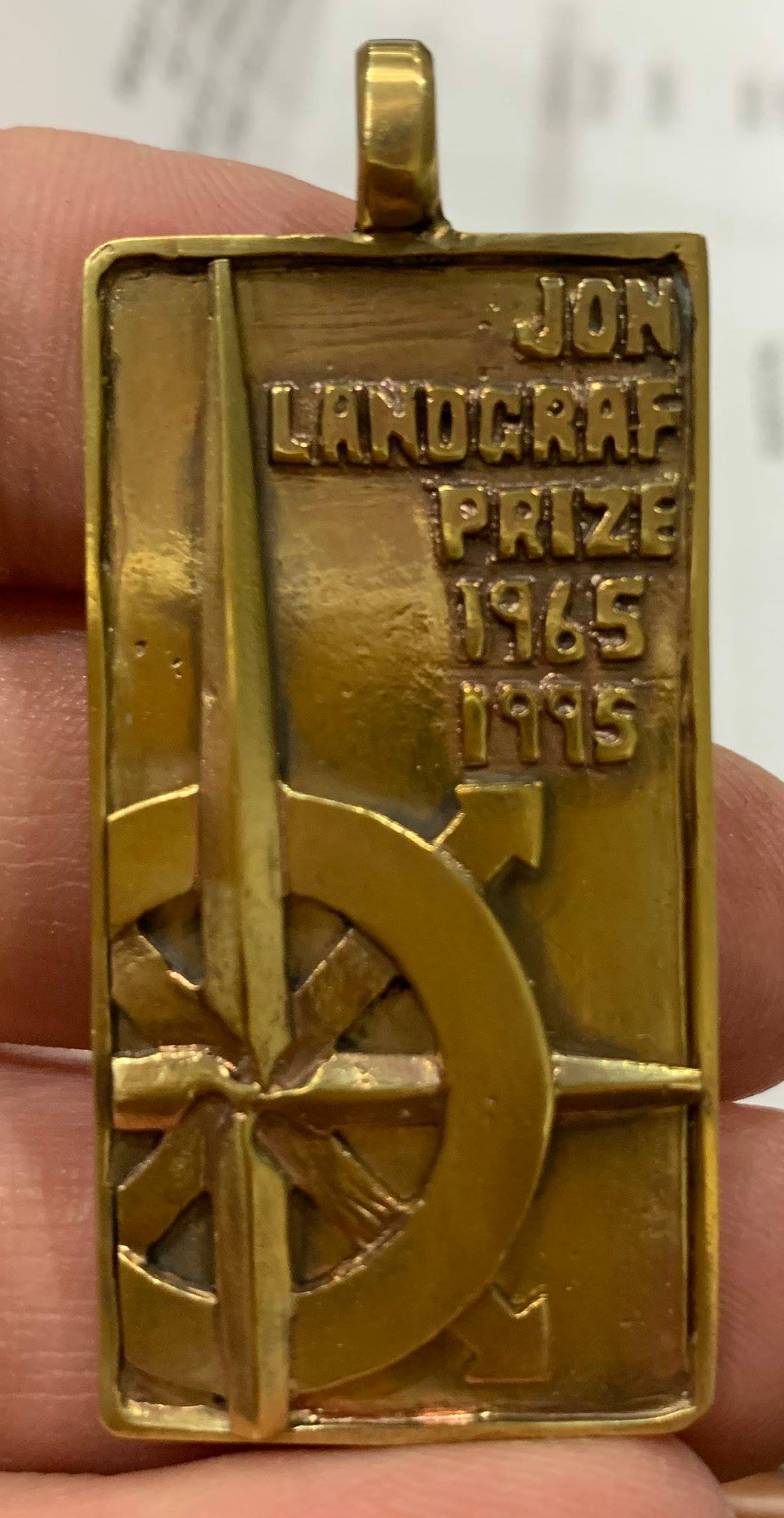
The Jonathan Zerse Landgraf Medal

== Activities ==
=== Awards ===
Since 1995, the Jonathan Zerse Landgraf medal has been presented annually to the winner of each Lair's Mass Challenge competition. First-time winners receive the medal in bronze; two-time winners have their medal silver-plated; three-time winners have their medal gold-plated, Each subsequent win is marked with the addition of a star on the ribbon. The award is a memorial in honor of an early member of the society. As of October 2021, a total of 21 medals have been awarded.

The Rascal o' the Year trophy is presented annually in each chapter to the individual who most exemplifies the qualities of the society, as determined by popular vote.

=== Beer ===
In 2023, the Ephorate of the Rascals, Rogues, and Rapscallion licensed the name "Rascals, Rogues, and Rapscallions" to the Van Lieu's Brewing Company of Perkasie, Pennsylvania. This New England-style double IPA is available on tap at several restaurants and taverns in eastern Pennsylvania.

=== Scholarly publishing ===
Since 2001, the Doylestown chapter has published scholarly papers under the moniker Occasional Papers of The Doylestown Institute. It includes some of the presentations at RR&R quarterly meetings.

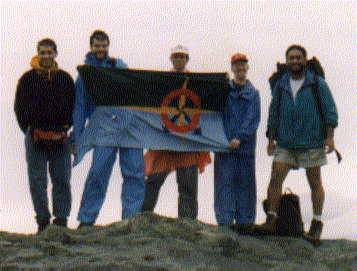
Roanoke Lair raise the flag over Mount Rogers, the highest point in Virginia.

== Membership ==
Members are organized into four ranks: Postulates, Rascals, Rogues, and Rapscallions. A man joins the society at the rank of Postulate. Upon completing one “Mass Challenge” and one “Research Report” within two years, the Postulate is elevated to Rascal and receives from the Lair his "Rascal Challenge," a specific research topic on which he is challenged to discover interesting and important results. Upon his presentation of his "Rascal Challenge" report at a regular meeting of the Lair, the Rascal is elevated to Rogue and receives a "Rogue Challenge" from the Order of Rapscallions. Upon his presentation of his "Rogue Challenge" report at a "Rogues' Dinner," the Rogue is elevated to Rapscallion and becomes a member of the Order of Rapscallions.

== Governance ==
Chapter (lair) officers include the director, Assistant Director, Secretary, Treasurer, Keeper of the Humidor, and Archivist. Coordinating the work of the RR&R at a national level and acting as the society's Board of Trustees is the Ephorate, a council comprising three Ephors, a constitutional office found in ancient Sparta.

== Chapters ==
The fraternity is organized into chapters called Lairs.

Lair	Charter date and range	Location	Status	Ref.
	February 3, 1989 – c. 1994	Manhattan, New York City, New York	Inactive	
No. 1	March 5, 1994	Pittsburgh, Pennsylvania	Active	(Note: Members are associated with the University of Pittsburgh, Bellefield Presbyterian Church, and the BGI Buddhist Fellowship.)
No. 2	January 6, 1996 – 1997	Roanoke, Virginia	Inactive	(Note: After a year, Lair No. 2 went inactive. The fraternity refers to it as "the Lost Lair of Roanoke".)
No. 3	November 11, 2000	Doylestown, Pennsylvania	Active	

== See also ==
- List of general fraternities
