= O'Shea Building =

- U.S. National Register of Historic Places
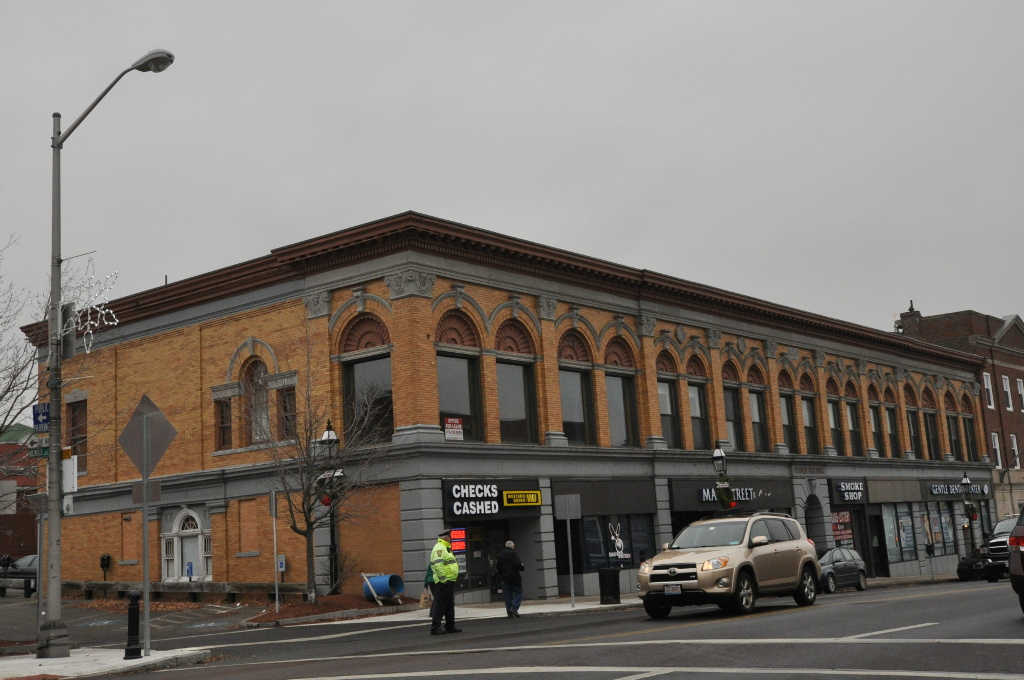

- Location within Massachusetts Location within the United States
- Location: 7–15 Main Street, Peabody, Massachusetts, US
- Coordinates: 42°31′31″N 70°55′35″W
- Area: Less than one acre
- Built: 1904
- Architectural style: Renaissance revival
- NRHP reference No.: 09000710
- Added to NRHP: January 11, 1980

The O'Shea Building is a historic commercial building located at 7–15 Main Street in Peabody, Massachusetts. Built in 1904 by Thomas O'Shea, one of the city's leading businessmen at the time, it is a well-preserved example of commercial Renaissance revival architecture. The building was listed on the National Register of Historic Places in 1980.

== Description and history ==
The O'Shea Building is located on the south side of Main Street, just east of Peabody Square, in the city's central business district. It is a two-story building, constructed out of brick, limestone, and granite, with Renaissance revival styling. It occupies a footprint of 160 feet (49 m) on Main Street, with a shorter frontage on Nichols Lane. Facing Main Street, it consists of three store fronts on each side of a slightly projecting central arched entrance to the office spaces above. The retail floor is divided from the offices by a pressed metal entablature, a feature that also appears above the second-story. The second floor consists of a series of arched window openings, that are grouped into pairs divided by Corinthian pilasters.

The building is one of two buildings, the other being the Second O'Shea Building, which stands adjacent to this one on Peabody Square. It was also built too by Thomas O'Shea, one of the city's leading businessmen in the early 1900s. At the time both buildings were built, this section of Main Street was still largely residential, with some small shops. The original retail tenants of this block included a druggist, dry goods dealer, grocer, and milliner, and the upstairs housed professional offices and fraternal social organizations, including the Grand Army of the Republic and the Knights of Columbus.

== See also ==
- National Register of Historic Places listings in Essex County, Massachusetts
