= Independent Order of Vikings =

Swedish-American fraternal organization

- Established: June 2, 1890; 136 years ago
- Founded at: Chicago, United States
- Type: Mutual aid society
- Region served: United States
- Website: iovikings.org

The Independent Order of Vikings is a Swedish-American fraternal organization promoting Swedish culture and language. It was founded in Chicago in the 1890s and has members throughout the United States.

Authorities differ as to the order's date of foundation. Alan Axelrod states that it was founded on June 2, 1890, in Chicago, while Alvin J. Schmidt states it was founded in 1896, at the same city. However, a brief article in the Chicago Tribune on June 7, 1930 (page 2) notes that the group was celebrating its 40th anniversary that day at its home for aged members at Gurnee, IL.

== Benefits ==
The group provides insurance benefits, as well as organizing events celebrating Swedish traditions and culture. These activities have included languages classes on Scandinavian languages as well as song and dance programs for traditional Scandinavian music and dance. Lodges have also sponsored bowling and golfing events.

Its charitable activities have included participating in blood drives, visiting hospitalized and sick members and sponsoring scholarships. By 1923 it operated a home for aged members.

The group provides life insurance and other financial products to its members as well as conducting social activities celebrating Scandinavian culture. By 1923 it did business in Illinois, Indiana, Michigan and Nebraska.

== Membership ==
In 1923 the order was open to men of Swedish birth or descent and had 10,643 benefit members and 58 social members.

By the 1970s membership was open to Swedes, people of Swedish descent or a person married to the same. There were 10,500 members in the mid 1960s and 9,500 in 1978. There were 9,300 members in 1995.

== Organization ==
The order is organized on a two-level structure. Local chapters are called "lodges" and the national body is the "grand lodge" which meets biennially. There were 80 lodges in the mid-1960s and 63 in 1978. The head officer is called the grand chief. In 1979, the headquarters of the group were in Chicago, Illinois, though now it appears to be based in Springfield, Illinois.

In the early 1920s the order's "Grand Lodge" was located at 80 W. Washington Street, Chicago and there were 58 subordinate lodges.

Edward Myrbeck, the founder of a Viking Club in Braintree, served as grand chief of the Independent Order of Vikings from 1963 to 1965. He was later knighted by Gustaf VI Adolf of Sweden for "cultivating" relations between Sweden and the United States. Following Myrbeck's death in July 1995, the Independent Order of Vikings held a service in honor of him.
