= Honorable Order of the Blue Goose, International =

American fraternal and charitable organization

The Honorable Order of the Blue Goose, International is a fraternal and charitable organization of men and women that work in the insurance industry. The 1906 San Francisco earthquake occurred on April 18, sending shock waves through the insurance industry, threatening to destroy its entire existence. With this gloom hanging over the industry, the group was founded as a one-time joke to initiate three new unsuspecting insurance fieldmen into a fake lodge, the Ancient and Honorable Order of the Blue Goose, during the Wisconsin Fieldmen's Meeting on the evening of June 19, 1906, at the Oakwood Hotel in Green Lake, Wisconsin, United States. The "fake lodge" soon grew to have thousands of members throughout the United States and Canada. International Headquarters are maintained near Milwaukee, Wisconsin, United States at the Wisconsin Home Nest.

== Organization ==
Local chapters are called "Ponds". Each Pond has six officers: Most Loyal Gander, the president; Supervisor of the Flock, vice-president; Custodian of the Goslings, warden; Guardian of the Pond, door guard; Wielder of the Goose Quill, secretary; Keeper of the Golden Goose Egg, treasurer. Some Ponds are further split into Puddles, where there are multiple cities in each state or province, and at one time one Puddle even had a Pothole. A fledgling group was even started in Australia. Blue Goose is governed by the Grand Nest, with each Pond sending two delegates, and which then elects a group of officers, one each from each of the five regions.

Blue Goose has an annual Grand Nest Meeting of delegates, which is a Summer convention held at various locations throughout the United States and Canada, where its members (Ganders) and their families meet for fun and fellowship. There is usually a large class of new members (Goslings) initiated at that meeting.

== Membership ==
In 1922 there were reportedly 5,000 members of the Order. There were 10,000 members in 1989. As of June 22, 2013, membership stood at 3800 Ganders.

== Ritual ==
The Cardinal Principles of the order are Character, Charity and Fellowship. There is a secret key honk (password) and a secret salutation that have existed since the flight of the first Blue Goose on June 19, 1906.

== Philanthropy ==
The Order promotes fellowship among insurance professionals and charitable giving. Although the official international charity is Special Olympics, each Pond is free to support whatever local charitable endeavor they choose such as food donations, clothing drives, and donations of time and service to charitable causes. The International Charity Report for FY July 1, 2012 to June 30, 2013, reports that the organization gave a reported $171,164.98 in cash donations to various charities. Some Ponds did not submit reports. Ponds also gave hundreds of man-hours to charitable endeavors, plus unknown quantities of donations-in-kind of books, clothing, food, games, toys, etc. Additionally, Ponds gave scholarships totaling $7,750.

== Grand Nest of the Blue Goose ==
There was also a splinter or imitation of the society, known as the Grand Nest of the Blue Goose, founded in 1906 and based in Kansas and Missouri. Like the mainstream Blue Goose its lodges were called "Ponds". The chief officer was the "Most Loyal Grand Gander", and other officers included the "Grand Custodian of Goslings", "Grand Guardian of the Nest" and the "Grand Keeper of the Golden Goose Egg".

== See also ==
- Fraternal organization
- List of general fraternities
