= Order of Heptasophs =

American fraternal organization

- Formation: 1852
- Location: New Orleans, Louisiana, United States

The Order of Heptasophs was a fraternal organization established in New Orleans, Louisiana in April 1852. The name is derived from Greek roots meaning seven and wise and means the seven wise men. The Order was founded at New Orleans, April 6, 1852, by Alexander Leonard Saunders, and early members included ex-governors, ex-mayors, etc.

== History ==
The organization was originally called the "Seven Wise Men", and it may have been formed by graduates of the earlier Mystical Seven or Rainbow Society that were popular college fraternities in the South during this period. Albert Stevens noted at least a strong similarity in their rituals and nomenclature.

The Heptasophs themselves elaborated an ornate pseudohistory dating back to 1104 BC and "the first Zoroaster". Allegedly the ancient King of Persia would select six Magi who were skilled in both statecraft and occult arts and they would meet in a cavern beneath the royal palace at Ispahan. This was also how princes were trained but they were only admitted "by merit". The philosophy of these "Seven Wise Men" directed the affairs of the Persian Empire until their overthrow by Muhammad in 638 AD.

What is known is that after being "introduced" in New Orleans in April 1852, a Grand Conclave of Louisiana was set in June of that year and incorporated in 1854. A "Supreme Conclave", or organization embracing several states was organized in 1857 and had its first "communication" (convention). The early growth of the organization was principally in the Southern states and it lost many members much of its influence during the Civil War. The group was always conservative with little effort being made to extend it into other areas.

After the Civil War the group began to grow again and during the early 1870s experienced a rapid growth in membership, reaching a high point of 4,000. The depression of the mid-1870s checked its growth and led to a movement for a general death benefit (local conclaves were allowed to create benefit options, but there were not overall benefits). When the Supreme Conclave rejected this idea the zeta Conclave of Baltimore forced a schism leading to the creation of the Improved Order of Heptasophs. There was an intense rivalry between the two groups for a few years, but this died down after the older order adopted its own benefit plan in 1880

During the 1870s, the Order became popular among some German Americans and was said to have spread to Germany by 1877.

== Organization ==
The order worked four degrees, the initiatory degree where the Persian pseudo-history is described, and three further degrees which illustrated the vicissitudes pursuing the course of duty. Also "[t]o satisfy the modern demand for a military feature" an optional uniformed rank was introduced. A life insurance branch, named the "endowment rank" was established in 1880 and was open to members in good standing who passed a medical exam. The amount paid was $300. Finally, there was the Heptsophian Mutual Benefit fund which gave aid to the widows, heir and assignees of the members, up to $500 on a 25 cent assessment. Wives of members were also eligible for membership in the Fund.

Membership was open to white males over 18 who were of good moral character, believed in a Supreme Being, possessed a known reputable means of support, free from any mental or physical disability and were educated enough to fill out their own application. Each local conclave could set its own upper age limit. There was no female auxiliary.

The organization was typical of the day with local Subordinate Conclaves, statewide Grand Conclaves and the Supreme Conclave at the top. Grand Conclaves were composed of Past Archons of Subordinate Conclaves and the Supreme Conclave composed of Past Grand Archons. At its height the group was present in 18 states, principally in the South.

== Publications ==
=== Serials ===
- The Heptasoph. New Orleans : [s.n.], L.R. Simmons & Co.) 1869-?

=== Selected pamphlets ===
- Constitution of the Order of S.W.M. for the government of the Grand Conclave of Louisiana, and subordinate conclaves under its jurisdiction. Also: The by-laws and rules of order of Alpha conclave No. 1, of the city of New Orleans. New Orleans, J. Beggs, 1855
- Grand conclave work for the use of Grand conclaves of S.W.M. working in the English language. New Orleans, Printing of the Order, 1861
- Tratado sobre la iniciacion y grados de la Orden De Los S.S. : traducida e impresa bajo la direccion de Anthony Sambola, grado 7, miembro del Supremo Conclave y Gran Jefe del Gran Conclave de la Luisiana Nueva Orleans : Imprenta de la Orden 1861
- Traité sur l'initiation et les grades de l'ordre des sept sages, (S.W.M.) Nouvelle-Orleans : Imprimerie de L'Ordre, 1861

== See also ==
- List of North American fraternal benefit orders
