= International Alliance of Catholic Knights =

Non-governmental organization

- Abbreviation: IACK
- Formation: 12 October 1979
- Founder: Leaders of six fraternal societies, convened on the occasion of the Diamond Jubilee of the Knights of Saint Columba
- Founded at: Glasgow, Scotland
- Location: London, UK
- Website: www.iack.org

The International Alliance of Catholic Knights (IACK) is a non-governmental organization made up of eleven Roman Catholic fraternal orders from 27 countries on six continents. The IACK was founded in Glasgow on 12 October 1979 at a meeting of the leaders of six fraternal societies, convened on the occasion of the Diamond Jubilee of the Knights of Saint Columba. The organization is headquartered in Hampshire, U.K.

The IACK is currently an associate member of the Dicastery for the Laity, Family and Life. The Dicastery for the Laity, Family and Life is a dicastery of the Roman Curia. Pope Francis announced its creation on 15 August 2016, effective 1 September 2016. It took over the functions and responsibilities of the Pontifical Council for the Laity and the Pontifical Council for the Family. It has responsibility "for the promotion of the life and apostolate of the lay faithful, for the pastoral care of the family and its mission according to God's plan and for the protection and support of human life."

== Member organizations ==
Order	Founded	Joined IACK	Region(s)
Knights of Saint Columba	1919	1979	Great Britain
Knights of Columbus	1882	1979	United States, Canada, Mexico, Philippines, Guam, Saipan, Poland, Ukraine, Lithuania, South Korea, France
Knights of Saint Columbanus	1915	1979	Ireland
Knights of the Southern Cross	1919	1979	Australia
Knights of the Southern Cross (New Zealand)	1922	1979	New Zealand
Knights of Da Gama	1943	1980	South Africa
Knights of Marshall	1926	1983	Ghana, Liberia, Benin, and Togo
Knights of Saint Mulumba	1953	1986	Onitsha, Anambra State, Nigeria
Knights of Peter Claver	1909	1987	United States, Colombia
Knights of Saint Virgil		1992	Austria
Fraternal Order of Saints Peter and Paul		1992	The Gambia
Knights of Saint Gabriel		1997	United Nations
Knights of Saint Thomas the Apostle		1998	Pakistan
The Order of Our Lady Queen of Peace		2000	Mauritius
Knights of Saint Thomas More	2001	2001	Belgium

== Mission statement ==
During the constitutional meeting, it was resolved that these Fraternal Orders would found an International Alliance for the purpose of working together for the mutual advantage of the individual Member Orders and the extension of Catholic Knighthood throughout the world. Furthermore, the IACK holds its members to:

- Bring the message of Christ to all people.
- Give loyalty and support in every way possible to our Holy Father The Pope and all Bishops, Priests and Religious throughout the world.
- Use their individual and joint influence to eliminate injustice from society.
- Cooperate with other Catholic international organizations and the Pontifical Council for the Laity to advance the Christian way of life.
- Extend the vision of The Blessed Father Michael J. McGivney (founder of the Knights of Columbus) by assisting each Member Order to progress and grow and by promoting the establishment of new Orders of Catholic Knights.
- Strengthen the individual and distinct Member Orders by corporate action and to strive to deepen the faith of members of the Alliance and all Catholics in general by encouraging their active and generous participation in the Life and Mission of the Church.
- Pursue these aims by uniting all throughout the world in prayer.

The IACK was approved as a Catholic international organization by the Holy See in 1981. By a decree dated 14 April 1992 the International Alliance of Catholic Knights was given official recognition by the Vatican as an International Catholic Association of the Faithful, in accordance with Canons 298–311 and 321–329 of the Code of Canon Law.

== Leadership ==
It was agreed that the Supreme Knight or National President of each Member Order would form an International Council which would meet annually (now biennially) and be responsible for the organization and development of the Alliance and would provide a forum in which the leaders of the Orders could discuss matters of common concern. The Leaders present at this historic gathering are recognized as the Founders of the International Alliance of Catholic Knights.
