= Improved Order of Heptasophs =

American fraternal organization

The Improved Order of Heptasophs was a fraternal order in the United States that existed from 1878-1917. It was distinguished from its parent organization, the Order of Heptasophs in that its main focus was on insurance.

== History ==
In the mid-1870s there was a dispute within the Order of Heptasophs. While local chapters or Conclaves were allowed to pay benefits at option since 1872, others wanted a general fund for death benefits. Unable to convince the conservative leadership of the group to offer general benefits, the Zeta Conclave #6 of Baltimore initiated a schism and led a number of members out of the group. A call was issued August 10, 1878 by Judge George V. Metzel, John W. Cruett, James Watkins, the Hon. John G. Mitchell, W. F. C. Gerhardt and Herbert J. Thurn, all of Maryland, for a convention to found a new society. It was addressed to fourteen other Heptasophs, six each from Maryland and Pennsylvania and one each from Virginia and Kentucky. The convention assembled on August 27 at the Odd Fellows Hall in Philadelphia. There were only twenty delegates, the six signers of the call and the fourteen addressees. Nevertheless, they organized themselves as the Supreme Conclave of the new Improved Order of Heptasophs, with Judge Metzel as the first Archon

The organization grew slowly, with the 83 members of the Zeta Conclave as the core of the membership. At the first ordinary annual session of the order, in 1879, there were only 149 members in nine local conclaves and by 1880 it had 516 in 12 conclaves. This was partly due to intense opposition from the older Order. However, by 1899 it grew to 35,000 members in twenty states, 12,000 in Maryland alone. The organization reached a membership of 676,887 in 1915, at its peak.

Two Subordinate Conclaves, the Zeta Conclave in Baltimore and the Grant Conclave at Easton, Pennsylvania, were prosperous enough to build their own fraternal halls.

In May 1917 the Improved Order of Heptasophs merged with the Fraternal Aid Union. The Fraternal Aid Union changed its name to the Standard Life Association in 1933. The Standard Life Association in turn became Standard Mutual Life, a mutual company, in 1968.

== Organization ==
Unusually for a nineteenth century American fraternal order, the Improved Order of Heptasophs dispensed with the state or "Grand" level of organization and consisted only of the local Subordinate Conclaves and the Supreme Conclave, which had control over the groups business and beneficiary activities. The Supreme Conclave consisted of officers and members elected by members of the Subordinate Conclaves, as well as the charter members, who sat as Supreme Past Archons.

== See also ==
- List of North American fraternal benefit orders
