= Golden Age of Fraternalism =

Growth of US fraternal society membership

The Golden Age of Fraternalism is a term referring to a period when membership in the fraternal societies in the United States grew at a very rapid pace in the latter third of the 19th century and continuing into the first part of the 20th. At its peak, it was suggested that as much as 40% of the adult male population held membership in at least one fraternal order.

Major examples are the Freemasons, the Knights of Columbus, the Rechabites, the Odd Fellows, the Good Templars, the Elks, the Shriners, and Rotary Club, as well as the second iteration of the Ku Klux Klan.

== Beginnings ==
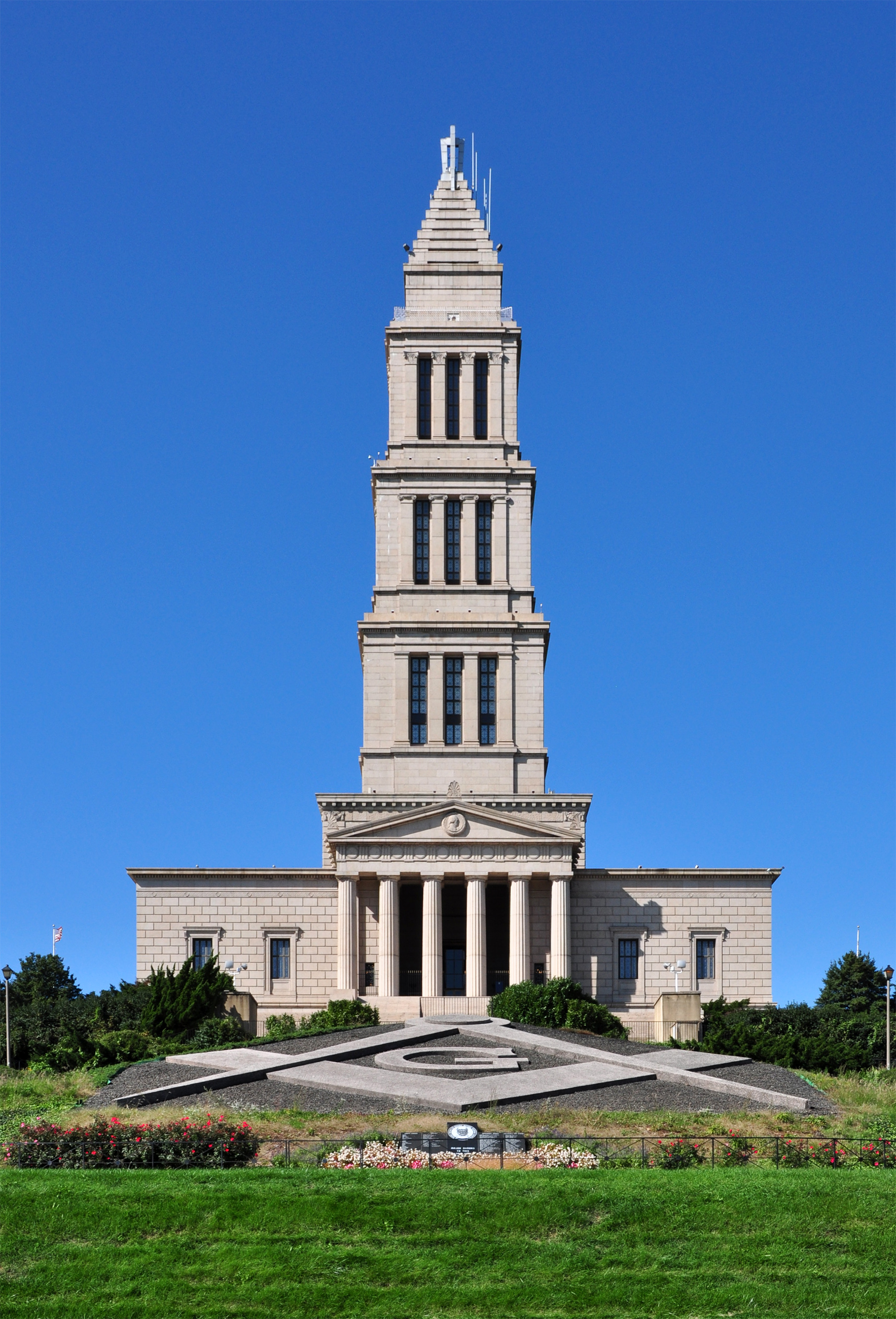
The George Washington Masonic National Memorial is an example of one of the monumental buildings sponsored by the Freemasons during the "Golden Age of Fraternalism."

The earliest fraternal societies, the Freemasons and the Odd Fellows, had their roots in 16th century Scotland. The Freemasons were especially influential and counted such prestigious members as Ben Franklin and George Washington during the revolutionary era. They experienced a precipitous decline after the Morgan Affair led to a moral panic against secret societies, but had largely recovered by the 1850s, albeit slowly.

The Independent Order of Good Templars, which is part of the temperance movement, was unique in that from the beginning, it admitted both men and women, as well as both African Americans and European Americans.

The first order promoting teetotalism is the Independent Order of Rechabites (IOR), which was founded in 1835 and is also part of the temperance movement.

== Rise and peak membership ==
After the American Civil War, the Grand Army of the Republic was formed, taking its membership from Union veterans seeking to continue the camaraderie of military service. Other fraternal organizations arose as well, such as the Independent Order of Good Templars (1851), Knights of Pythias (1864), the Patrons of Husbandry (the Grange, 1867), Benevolent and Protective Order of Elks (1868), the Knights of Columbus (1882), the Loyal Order of Moose (1888), and the Woodmen of the World (1890).

These organizations served various goals: mutual aid and insurance, political interests, or social functions, but they each offered their members the comfort of stability and belonging in a dynamic and rapidly industrializing society. They also were less exclusive than the older fraternities, the Masons and Odd Fellows, on which they were modeled. In response, these fraternities also enlarged and offered ever more elaborate ritual and costuming. By 1900, the Odd Fellows were the largest fraternity in the US, with almost a million members, followed closely by the Freemasons.

The effects of fraternalism on the development of government and society were profound. Although, with the exception of the Grand Army of the Republic, they were racially segregated, they nonetheless brought together a broad range of classes under each fraternal banner. They provided a very important insurance function for the average workman, and they brought organization to various political ends.

The Freemasons drew many of its members from the professional and merchant classes, and did not have an explicit insurance program, leaving them financially better off than most other orders. Their origin and ritual, as their name suggests, likely derives from medieval builders. As a result, during the Golden Age of Fraternalism they built many impressive buildings and monuments that survive in most US cities.

== Decline ==
The last major fraternity to be organized during this era was also its most controversial— the refounding of the Ku Klux Klan in 1915. Its principles were largely political as it supported an anti-Catholic, antisemitic, white nationalist, and anti-immigrant platform. Its decline was as spectacular as its rise. The overt venality of its leaders and their scandals caused widespread revulsion. The Great Depression of the 1930s hurt all the fraternal orders and the Klan went moribund.

Government welfare programs that formed during the Progressive and New Deal eras, as well as the rise of available commercial insurance, lessened the need for the mutual aid fraternities. Some, such as the Modern Woodmen of the World and the Independent Order of Foresters, became insurance companies themselves.

The Freemasons, as the oldest and most storied of the ritualistic fraternities, continued to grow as a result of an influx of members after World War II, reaching their zenith in terms of absolute numbers in 1959. However, as a percentage of the population, it never matched the reach it attained during the golden age of fraternalism and continues to decline. In 2024, the Masonic Service Association of North America reported only 869,429 members under their associated Grand Lodges. (This number only accounts for "mainstream" U.S. Grand Lodge and not PHA Masons, it also counts members per Lodges, so if a person is member of two Lodges he will count as two members).
