= Second O'Shea Building =

- U.S. National Register of Historic Places
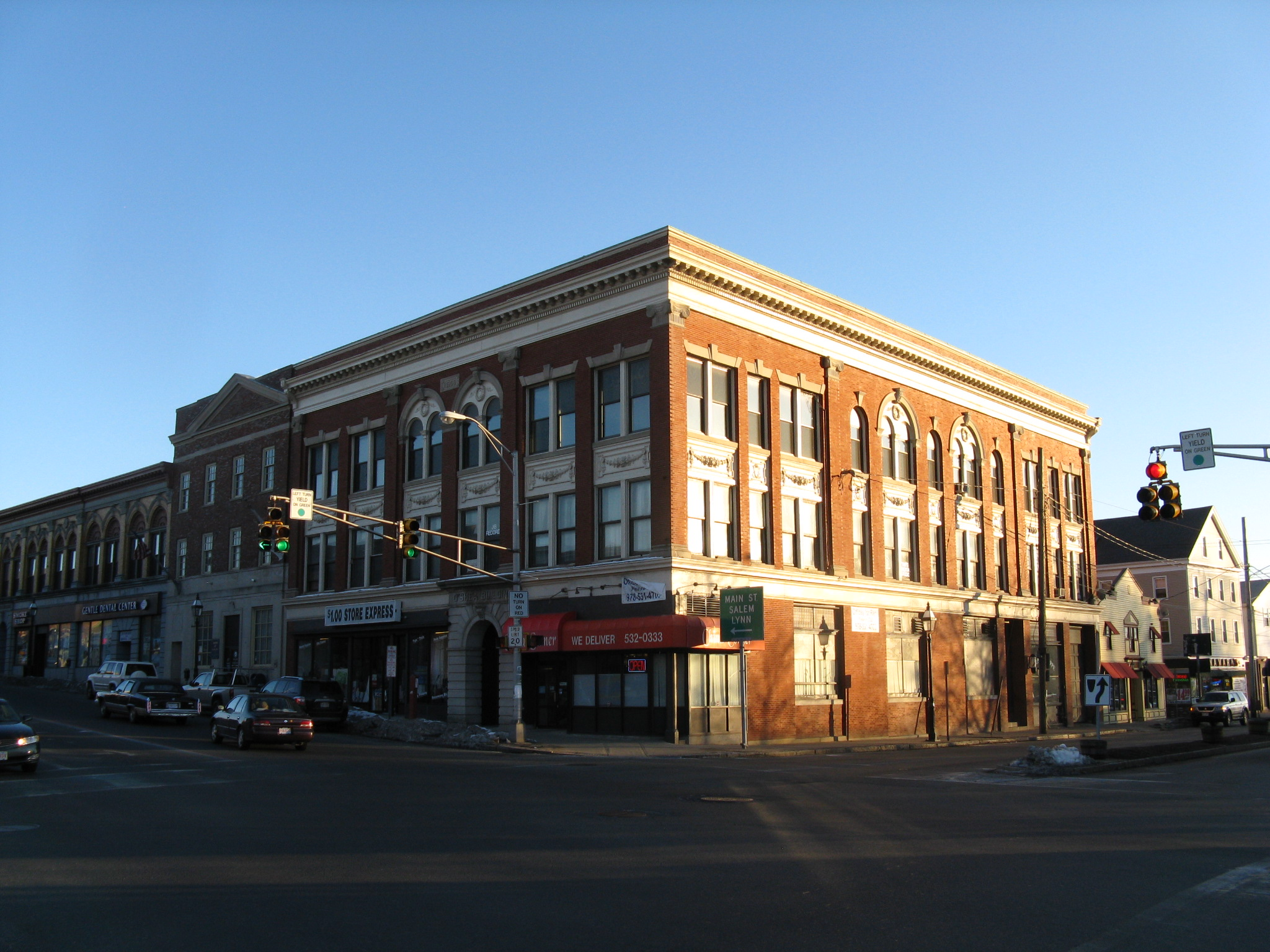
- Second O'Shea Building

- Location within Massachusetts Location within the United States
- Location: Peabody, Massachusetts
- Coordinates: 42°31′32″N 70°55′40″W
- Built: 1905
- Architect: M.F. Burk (Belmont, Massachusetts)
- Architectural style: Colonial Revival
- NRHP reference No.: 80004237
- Added to NRHP: March 27, 1980

The Second O'Shea Building is a historic commercial building at 9-13 Peabody Square in Peabody, Massachusetts. It is one of two similar buildings (see O'Shea Building for the other) built by Thomas O'Shea, a local leathermaker, in the 1900s. The three-story brick-and-sandstone Colonial Revival building occupies a prominent position in Peabody Square, the city's central intersection. Similarities to the earlier building include the arched entrances and window bays, and the brick pilasters (with limestone bases and capitals) between some of the window bays.

The building was listed on the National Register of Historic Places in 1980. In 2017, the building was sold at auction for $1.47 million. The building is currently under renovation by local developer Pat Todisco and will include 29 residential units, as well as restaurants on the ground floor.

== See also ==
- National Register of Historic Places listings in Essex County, Massachusetts
