= Knights of Marshall =

Ghanaian Catholic lay fraternal society

The Knights and Ladies of Marshall is a West African and London Roman Catholic male and female fraternal society, founded 18 November 1926; 99 years ago. Named after Sir James Marshall, the Knights of Marshall has been a member of the International Alliance of Catholic Knights (IACK) since 1983. Inspired by the Knights of Columbus, the Knights of Marshall took Sir James Marshall, a Scotsman and a Catholic layperson as their patron.

Membership of the Knights of Marshall is open to "any literate and practicing Catholic or communicant and between the ages of 18 and 60 years . . . of good character not convicted by any court of competent jurisdiction for an offence involving dishonest or moral turpitude". Current membership extends to many countries of West Africa, along with London, England. As of 2021, the Knights of Marshall is organised into 146 groups, known as Councils, and can be found throughout Ghana, Togo, Benin, Liberia, Sierra Leone, Burkina Faso, Cote d’Ivoire, and England the United Kingdom.

The Knights of Marshall are also members of Unum Omnes, the International Council of Catholic Men.
