= Memorial Building (Topeka, Kansas) =

- U.S. National Register of Historic Places
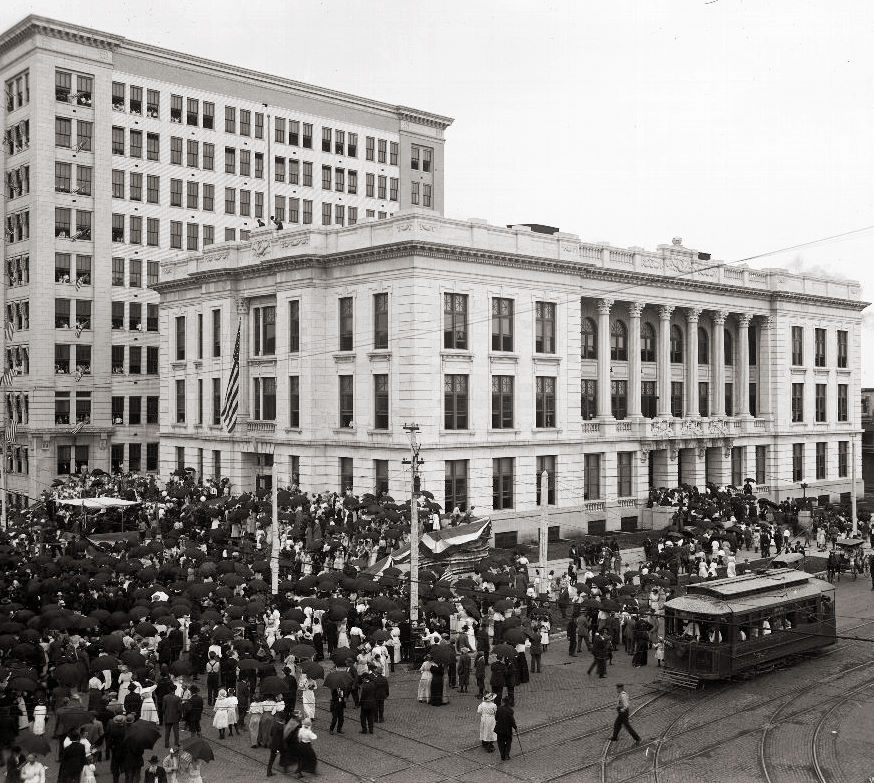
- Dedication ceremonies of Memorial Hall, 1914
- Location: 120 West 10th Avenue, Topeka, Kansas
- Coordinates: 39°2′47″N 95°40′34″W
- Built: 1914
- Architect: Charles Chandler
- Architectural style: Renaissance Revival
- NRHP reference No.: 75000724
- Added to NRHP: July 17, 1975

Memorial Building, also known as G.A.R. Memorial Hall, is a historic Grand Army of the Republic hall located in Topeka, Kansas, United States. On July 17, 1975, the building was added to the National Register of Historic Places.

== History ==
The construction of Memorial Hall was financed by war claims paid to the State of Kansas by the federal government; one for $97,466.02 for equipping and putting soldiers in the field during the American Civil War, and the other for $425,065.43 for repelling invasions of Confederate soldiers and dealing with American Indian Wars.

In 1909, a legislative money appropriation act was passed. A commission selected the site, acquired the land title, and supervised construction of Memorial Hall. On September 27, 1911, President William Howard Taft laid the ceremonial cornerstone. The building was completed in 1914 and dedicated before 25,000 people on May 27 of that same year.

Since 2000, Memorial Hall has served as headquarters for the Kansas Attorney General and Kansas Secretary of State.

== See also ==
- Kansas Historical Society
- Kansas in the American Civil War
- Sons of Union Veterans of the Civil War
