= Order of Alhambra =

North American Catholic fraternal order

Order of the Alhambra, Inc.
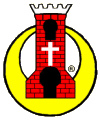
- Formation: February 29, 1904; 122 years ago
- Type: Catholic Fraternal order
- Founder: William Harper Bennett
- Supreme Commander: Clifton Dake
- Supreme Chaplain: Rev. Paul K. Ballien
- Website: www.orderalhambra.org

The Order of the Alhambra, Inc. is a Catholic fraternal order founded on February 29, 1904, in Brooklyn, New York, by William Harper Bennett. Since then it has spread throughout the United States and Canada, with plans to expand throughout the rest of the world. The order, open to men and women alike, currently has "caravans" active in New York, Massachusetts, Pennsylvania, Maryland, Virginia, Ohio, New Jersey, Louisiana, Mississippi, Florida, Illinois, Michigan, Texas, California, Washington D.C., as well as a handful of "caravans" in Canada.

== Name ==
The Order derives its name from The Alhambra, the Moorish palace in Granada, Spain, the last Moorish stronghold in Spain conquered by the forces of Ferdinand II of Aragon and Isabella I of Castile in 1492. It was after the completion of the Reconquista that the Spanish monarchs decided to fund Christopher Columbus' initial voyage to the Americas. Spanish, and arguably European, culture changed significantly with this change of leadership, especially since the Catholic religion became the dominant religion in the Iberian Peninsula. The significance of the conquest of the Alhambra in the spread and free practice of the Catholic faith, in Iberia and the Americas, greatly inspired the founder, much as Columbus himself has inspired the Knights of Columbus.

The Moorish motif of the Order's name carries over into the white fez and insignia worn by members, as well as the names of the Order's structure and titles.

== History ==
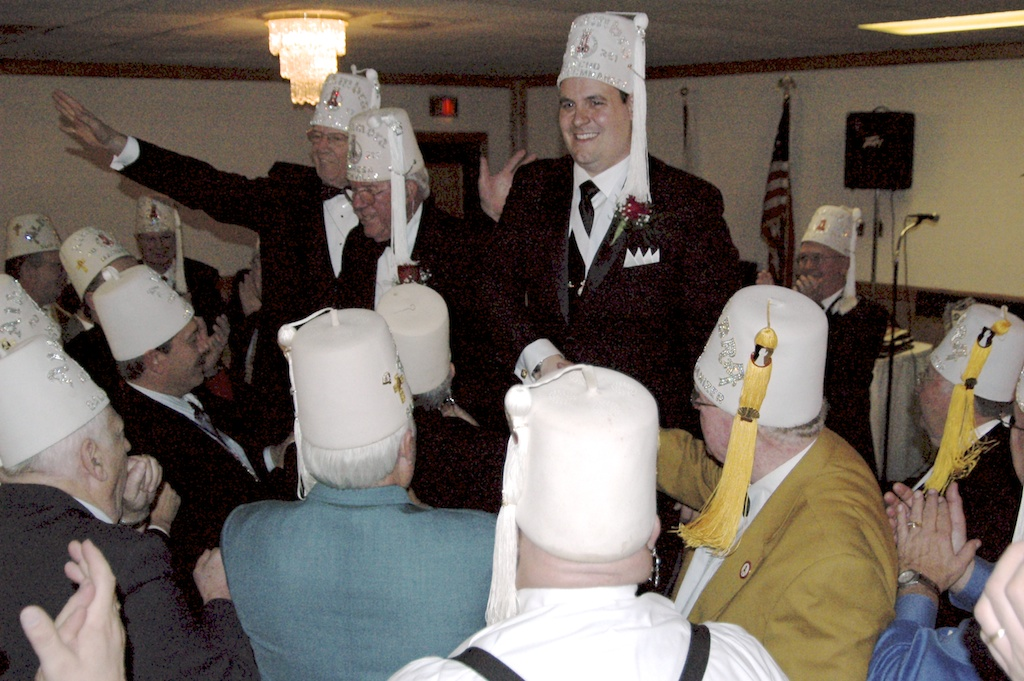
Each year the Order of Alhambra honors the Past Grand Commanders of each Caravan.

The Order was founded on February 29, 1904, in Brooklyn, New York by William Harper Bennett who also designed and authored the Knights of Columbus 4th Degree ceremony. The Order was originally conceived as a side degree or 5th and 6th Degree for the Knights of Columbus although it was never formally recognized as such by the Knights of Columbus. For many years, membership was restricted to members of the Knights of Columbus 4th Degree, but this requirement was later removed.

Membership in the Order was also restricted to men until July 2011 when membership was opened to women as well as an option determined by each caravan.

Many leaders of the Church are or have been members, including Pope Paul VI, Pope John Paul II and Pope Benedict XVI.

== Organization ==
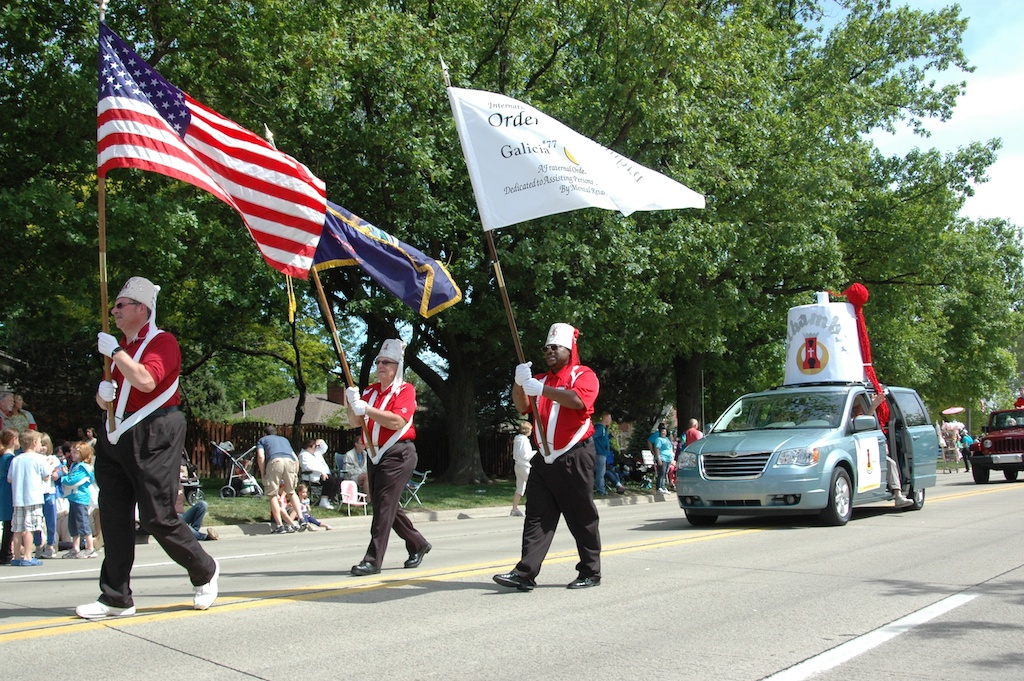
Members of Galicia Caravan 77 taking part in the 2013 St. Clair Shores, Michigan Memorial Day Parade.

Members of the Order are known as Sir Nobles and Lady Nobles after undergoing a "qualifying ceremonial." Groups of members are known as Caravans and are given a number, as well as a name of Moorish/Spanish origin from persons, places, or events during the Spanish Reconquista (for example, one Detroit, Michigan caravan is known as Galicia #77, after a northwestern region of Spain). Every two years, representatives from each caravan meet in what is known as the Grand Divan to elect Supreme Officers to serve on the Council of Viziers and address other issues affecting the Order. The Council of Viziers provides support to the Order between Grand Divans, and is headed by a Supreme Commander.

== Purposes and works ==
Ever since its founding, a peculiar focus of the Order has been finding, documenting, and memorializing persons, places, and events of significant historical value to North American Catholicism (including the order's namesake in Spain). Over 160 bronze plaques have been placed throughout the United States and Canada, mostly at places of worship.

At the caravan level, members engage in a variety of charitable works, usually related to the needs of their region. At a national level, the order of Alhambra is committed to three initiatives, namely undergraduate scholarships, memorials, and the Alhambra House Project.

Starting in 1993, the Order committed to establishing and maintaining group homes for developmentally disabled individuals. Houses are currently established in Virginia, California, Florida, Illinois, Michigan, New York, Ohio and Pennsylvania.
