= Knights of St Columba =

Catholic fraternal organization

- Abbreviation: KSC
- Formation: 5 October 1919
- Type: Catholic fraternal service Order
- Headquarters: 196 Clyde St, Glasgow G1 4JY
- Supreme Knight: Michael Akinrele
- Key people: The Incorporators
- Website: www.ksc.org.uk

The Knights of St Columba is a fraternal service order affiliated with the Catholic Church in Scotland, in England and Wales, and, through their Province of Liverpool, in the Isle of Man. Founded in Glasgow in 1919, the Knights are named in honour of Saint Columba, a 6th-century Celtic Church missionary descended from the Gaelic nobility of Ireland in modern County Donegal, who founded Iona Abbey and successfully evangelized both the Picts and Gaels of modern Scotland. The Knights describes themselves as dedicated to the principles of Charity, Unity and Fraternity. There are around 2400 members of the KSC, in over 200 councils across Great Britain. Membership is limited to Catholic men aged 16 and over, and promotes the social doctrine of the Catholic Church.

The organisation is apolitical and essentially democratic, does not admit women, and exists to support the mission of the Catholic Church. The KSC organisation is a member of the International Alliance of Catholic Knights. Founder of the Knights at Glasgow in 1919 and the first Supreme Knight was P. J. O'Callaghan.

Admission ceremonies usually take place in a Catholic parish during the celebration of Mass.

The group organises annual Christian pilgrimages to Aylesford Priory in Kent and Carfin Lourdes Grotto near Motherwell in North Lanarkshire. The 2019 centennial of the Knights' foundation was celebrated with a special pilgrimage to Iona Abbey, which was founded by the Knights' patron saint, followed by a Mass offered on site.

== History ==
The organisation was formed on 5 October 1919.

In 1995, the organisation was reported to have 10,000 members, including artisans and small business owners.

In 2005, the Knights of St Columba in St Albans were involved in fundraising for school projects in Indonesia.

In 2012, the organisation made public calls, reported in the news, for a street in York to be named after local Elizabethan era Catholic saint Margaret Clitherow, who had been canonized by Pope Paul VI as one of the Forty Martyrs of England and Wales.

In 2018, The Times of London reported that the Knights, after meticulous research, had made a ruling that Alice Nutter, a Lancashire noblewoman and Recusant who was convicted and executed for attending a witches' coven on Good Friday, 1612, was in reality a Catholic martyr. According to the Knights, Nutter had in reality been attending an illegal Mass at the time of the alleged coven and the prosecution was a frameup by a corrupt judge who coveted the Nutter estate, but who could not prove that Nutter was a Catholic. Accusing Nutter during the Pendle witch hunt, according to the Knights, was an easy alternative, particularly as she could not prove her innocence of witchcraft without self-incrimination for Recusancy. The Knights accordingly expressed support for Alice Nutter's Canonization.

Since 2020, the Knights' Council 1 at the University of Glasgow has been promoting Fr Alexander Cameron (1701-1746) by distributing holy cards with a prayer for his Canonization as a Saint and a Martyr by the Catholic Church. Fr. Cameron (Scottish Gaelic: Maighstir Sandaidh), was an outlawed Jesuit "heather priest" working among Clan Chisholm and Clan Fraser of Lovat in Strathglass, the Aird, and Glen Cannich during the Penal Laws and Jacobite Army military chaplain, who died after the Battle of Culloden aboard a Royal Navy prison hulk anchored in the River Thames. The same Council has also been involved in spreading the Legion of Mary and the St Vincent de Paul Society to fellow Millennial and Generation Z students, and in launching the new Brecbannoch Pilgrimage; bearing the relics of St Andrew, St Columba, and St Margaret of Scotland, which are on loan from Carfin Grotto, on foot inside a replica of the Brecbannoch of St Columba to Iona Abbey.

== Organisation ==
At local level, Members belong to a Council or Charter Council, led by the Grand Knight. The Charter Councils in an area (often corresponding to a Catholic Diocese) come together to form a Province, under the Provincial Grand Knight. Provinces are arranged into larger areas known as Regions, under the Regional Director, who is a member of the Board of Directors. Representatives of the Board of Directors, Regions and Provinces meet at least once annually at the Supreme Council which governs the Order. The Supreme Knight presides over the Supreme Council.

=== Chronology of Supreme Knights ===
- 1919–1922 Patrick Joseph O'Callaghan
- 1922–1929 Edward Henry
- 1929–1933 William Bishop KSG
- 1933–1936 Thomas Davis
- 1936–1945 William Loughrey
- 1945–1948 Thomas Leyland
- 1948–1951 Laurie Arnold
- 1951–1952 Daniel Kelly
- 1952–1955 Thomas McMenemy
- 1955–1958 James Mitton MBE
- 1958–1961 Francis Mildner
- 1961–1964 Stuart Harper
- 1964–1967 William Austin
- 1967–1970 P. N. Scott
- 1970–1972 Michael May
- 1972–1975 Martin Cairns
- 1975–1978 Christopher Seneviratne
- 1978–1981 Anthony Rouse KCSG KHS
- 1981–1984 P. Layden KCSG KHS
- 1984–1987 Walter Downey
- 1987–1990 Francis Redmond KCSG
- 1990–1993 Anthony Bateman KSG
- 1993–1996 Anthony Britten KCSG KCHS
- 1996–1999 Kenneth Hargreaves KSG
- 1999–2002 Anthony Britten KCSG KCHS
- 2002–2005 Anthony Doherty KSG
- 2005–2008 John Doran KSG
- 2008–2011 Jonjo McDonagh KSG
- 2011–2014 Ron Lynch KSG
- 2014–2017 Charlie McCluskey KSG
- 2017–2021 Bertie M. Grogan KSG
- 2021– 2024 Henry Welsh JP KSG
- 2024-Present Michael Akinrele

=== Ecclesiastical advisers ===
- Malcolm McMahon OP, Archbishop of Liverpool
- Tom Neylon, Auxiliary Bishop of Liverpool (12th ecclesiastical adviser)

== See also ==
- Knights of Columbus
- Knights of Columbanus
