= Knights of Da Gama =

South African Catholic fraternal society

The Knights of Da Gama are a fraternal, Roman Catholic, lay society based in South Africa, for Catholic men over 18 years of age. The society is named after the Portuguese explorer Vasco da Gama. They are affiliated to the International Alliance of Catholic Knights.
