= Benefit society =

Organization formed to provide mutual aid

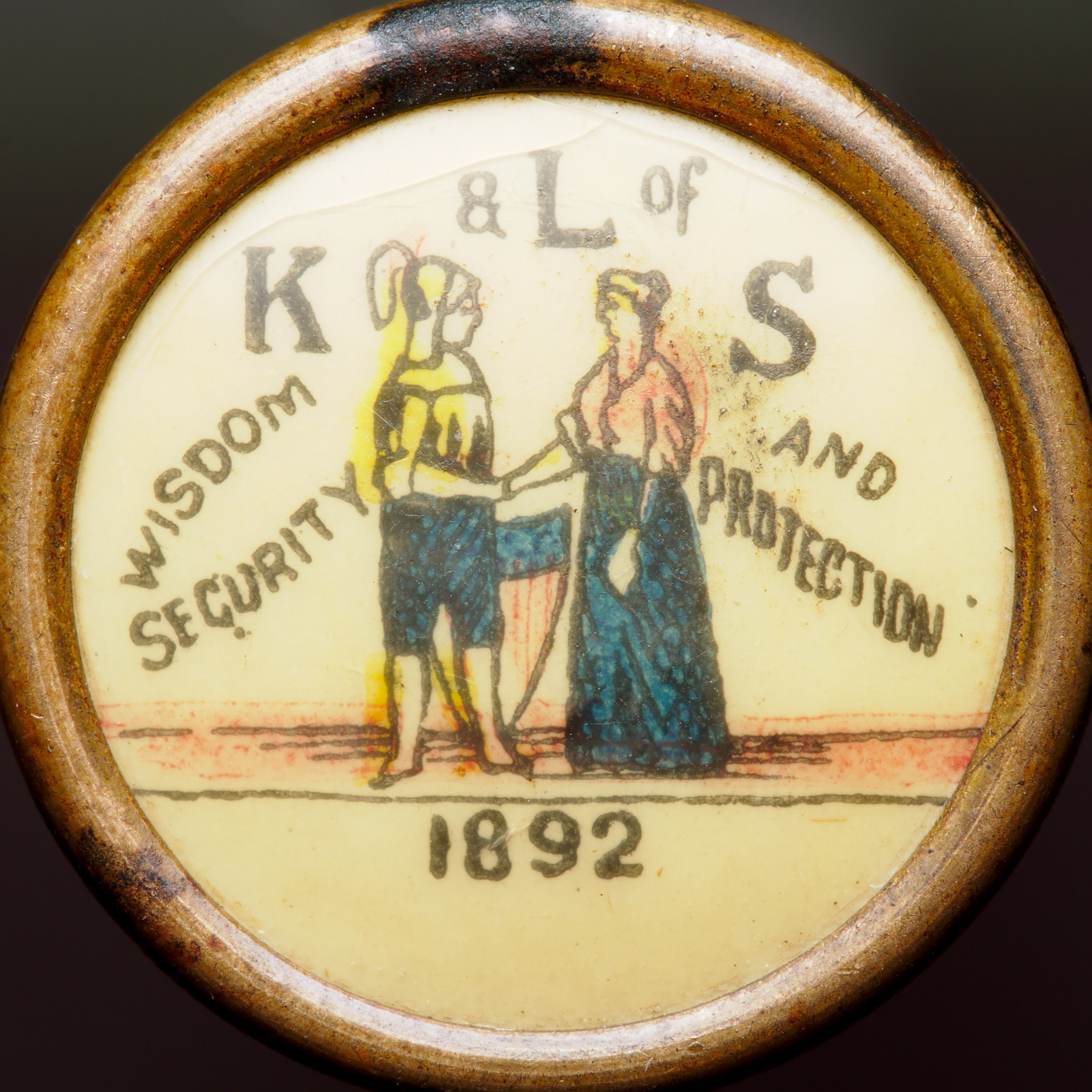
Pin button issued by "The Knights and Ladies of Security" of Topeka, Kansas

A benefit society, fraternal benefit society, or fraternal benefit order is a voluntary association formed to provide mutual aid, benefit, for instance, insurance for relief from sundry difficulties. Such organizations may be formally organized with charters and established customs or may arise ad hoc to meet the unique needs of a particular time and place. Often fitting this description include friendly societies, or mutual aid organizations.

Many major financial institutions existing today, particularly some insurance companies, mutual savings banks, and credit unions, trace their origins back to benefit societies, as can many modern fraternal organizations and fraternal orders which are now viewed as being primarily social. The contemporary legal system essentially requires all such organizations of appreciable size to incorporate one of these forms or another to continue to exist on an ongoing basis.

Benefit societies may be organized around a shared ethnic background, religion, occupation, geographical region, or other basis. Benefits may include financial security or assistance for education, unemployment, birth of a baby, sickness and medical expenses, retirement, and funerals. Often, benefit societies provide a social or educational framework for members and their families to support each other and contribute to the broader community.

Examples of benefit societies include trade unions, burial societies, friendly societies, cooperatives, credit unions, self-help groups, landsmanshaft, immigrant hometown societies, fraternal organizations built upon the models of fraternal orders such as the Freemasons and the Oddfellows, some coworking communities, and many others.

A benefit society can be characterized by

- members having an equivalent opportunity for a say in the organization
- members having potentially equivalent benefits
- aid going to those in need (strong helping the weak)
- a collection fund for payment of benefits
- educating others about a group's interest
- preserving cultural traditions
- mutual deference

== History of benefit societies ==
Examples of benefit societies can be found throughout history, including among secret societies of the Tang Dynasty in China and African-Americans during the post-revolutionary years, such as those who organized the Free African Society of Philadelphia, Pennsylvania. Philadelphia's first black organization, the Free African Society, was established in 1787 by two African American former enslaved people, Absalom Jones and Richard Allen. These two men were Methodist converts from evangelical masters, who permitted these men to purchase their freedom in the early 1780s.

Mutual aid was a foundation of social welfare in the United States until the early 20th century. Early societies not only shared material resources but also often advanced social values related to self-reliance and moral character. Many fraternal organizations were initially established as mutual aid societies, as government at the state and local level provided more support to private aid societies than the reverse. In 1890, 112,000 American residents lived in private charitable institutions, while only 73,000 resided in public almshouses. Toward the latter part of the nineteenth century, public aid was reduced as it was seen as contributing to sloth and dependency. In contrast, private aid was judiciously provided with greater checks for reform and recovery. Writing in 1890, Jacob Riis, commenting on the extent of private charity, says: "New York is, I firmly believe, the most charitable city in the world. Nowhere is there so eager a readiness to help ..."

Medieval guilds were an early basis for many Western benefit societies. A guild charter document from 1200 states:

"To become a gildsman,..it was necessary to pay certain initiation fees,..(and to take) an oath of fealty to the fraternity, swearing to observe its laws, to uphold its privileges, not to divulge its counsels, to obey its officers, and not to aid any non-gildsman under cover of the newly-acquired 'freedom.'"

This charter shows the importance of 'brotherhood', and the principles of discipline, conviviality, and benevolence. The structure of fraternity in the guild forms the basis for orders such as Freemasonry and other fraternal orders, friendly societies, and modern trade unions. Joining such an organization, a member gained the 'freedom' of the craft and the exclusive benefits that the organization could confer on members.

Historically, benefit societies have emphasized the importance of social discipline in conforming to the rules of the organization and society, and acting in a morally uplifting and ethical manner. Conviviality and benevolence are important principles. Fraternal societies differed from public and private hierarchical aid organizations by employing an "ethical principle of reciprocity." This removed the stigma of charity.

During the eighteenth and nineteenth centuries, benefit societies in the form of friendly societies and trade unions were essential in providing social assistance for sickness and unemployment, and improving social conditions for a large part of the working population. With the introduction in the early twentieth century of state social welfare programs and industrial, health, and welfare regulation, the influence and membership of benefit societies have declined in importance but remain significant. Nevertheless, in Europe, mutual benefit societies continue to provide statutory and supplementary healthcare coverage, accounting for 25 percent of the insurance market.

Peter Kropotkin posited early in the 20th century that mutual aid affiliations predate human culture and are as much a factor in evolution as is the "survival of the fittest" concept.

Oaths, secret signs and knowledge, and regalia were historically an essential part of many benefit societies. Still, they declined in use in most benefit societies during the late nineteenth and early twentieth centuries. Conversely, signs and ceremonies have become the mainstay of fraternal societies that no longer focus as much on mutual aid.

== Current benefit societies ==
Many of the features of benefit organizations today have been assimilated into organizations that rely on the corporate and political structures of our time. Insurance companies, religious charities, credit unions, and democratic governments now perform many of the same functions that were once the purview of ethnically- or culturally-affiliated mutual benefit associations.

New technologies have provided yet more opportunities for humanity to support itself through mutual aid. Recent authors have described the networked affiliations that produce collaborative projects. In modern Asia, rotating credit associations organized within communities or workplaces were widespread through the early twentieth century and continue in our time. Habitat for Humanity in the United States is a leading example of shared credit and labor pooled to help low-income people afford adequate housing.

In post-disaster reactions, formal benefit societies of our time often lend aid to others outside their immediate membership. In contrast, ad hoc benefit associations form among neighbors or refugees, generally lasting only as long as the emergency exists. Ad hoc mutual aid associations have been seen organized among strangers facing shared challenges in such disparate settings as the Woodstock Music and Arts Festival in New York in 1969, during the Beijing Tiananmen Square protests of 1989, for neighborhood defense during the Los Angeles Riots of 1992, and work of the organization Common Ground Collective which formed in New Orleans after Hurricane Katrina in 2005. The Rainbow Family organizes gatherings in National Forests of the United States each year around age-old models of ad hoc mutual aid.

== North America ==
Benefit societies, fraternal benefit societies or "fraternals" are not-for-profit membership organizations that have a representative form of government and are organized through a lodge system, commonly represented in the societies of North America. to carry out social, intellectual, educational, charitable, benevolent, moral, fraternal, patriotic or religious purposes. Fraternals provide members with life insurance and other financial protection benefits following state law and use the earnings to fund member-supported community activities. Fraternal benefit societies are chartered by state law and have been exempt from income tax under Section 501(c)(8) of the United States Tax Code since 1909.

=== History ===
Fraternal Benefit Societies trace their lineage back through mutual societies, friendly societies and eventually to medieval guilds. Many fraternal benefit societies were founded to serve the needs of immigrants and other underserved groups who shared common bonds of religion, ethnicity, gender, occupation, or shared values. The first modern American fraternal benefit society was the Ancient Order of United Workmen, founded by John J. Upchurch in 1868. "The Order of Knights of Pythias is a great international fraternity which was founded in Washington, DC, February 19, 1864, by Justus H. Rathbone..." The Knights had an "Endowment Rank" which included life, health and disability insurance.

As Walter Bayse wrote in his history of fraternal insurance:

"The American fraternal system had its beginning as a result of the fraternal desire of men to cooperate for their mutual welfare and happiness, and that the benefit plan they introduced followed an innate prompting to protect their dependents."

=== Structure ===
==== Model Fraternal Code ====
The Model Fraternal Code, which has been adopted in some form by most states, defines fraternal benefit societies as follows:

Section 1. FRATERNAL BENEFIT SOCIETIES. Any incorporated society, order, or supreme lodge, without capital stock, including one exempted under the provisions of Section 38(a)(2) of this Article whether incorporated or not, conducted solely for the benefit of its members and their beneficiaries and not for profit, operated on a lodge system with ritualistic form of work, having a representative form of government, and which provides benefits following this Article, is hereby declared to be a fraternal benefit society.

==== National Union v. Marlow ====
The court's opinion in National Union v. Marlow is considered to be the leading judicial pronouncement of what constitutes a fraternal society.

National Union v. Marlow 374 F. 775, 778 (1896)

A fraternal-beneficial society would be one whose members have adopted the same, or a very similar calling, avocation, or profession, or who are working in unison to accomplish some worthy object, and who for that reason have banded themselves together as an association or society to aid and assist one another, and to promote the common cause. The term "fraternal" can properly be applied to such an association, for the reason that the pursuit of a common object, calling, or profession usually tends to create a brotherly feeling among those who are thus engaged. *** Many of these associations make a practice of assisting their sick and disabled members, and of extending substantial aid to the families of deceased members. Their work is at the same time of a beneficial and fraternal character because they aim to improve the condition of a class of persons who are engaged in a common pursuit and to unite them by a stronger bond of sympathy and interest.

As indicated in this case, a fraternal benefit society is required to have a "common bond" among its members. Further, a society is required to specify in its laws the eligibility standards for membership, as well as classes of membership, the process of admission, and the rights and privileges of members.

A fraternal benefit society operates under a lodge system if it has a supreme governing body and subordinate lodges into which members are elected, initiated, or admitted under its laws. A society has a representative form of government if its supreme governing body is an assembly composed of delegates elected directly by members or intermediate assemblies, or a board similarly elected.

Fraternal benefit societies provide insurance benefits to their members, including life insurance and endowments, annuities, disability, hospital, medical, and nursing benefits, and such other benefits authorized for life insurers that are not inconsistent with the general fraternal laws.

=== 21st century ===
In the 21st century, fraternal benefit societies remain active in the United States. In addition to the mutual benefits provided to members, many fraternal benefit societies engage in charitable and volunteer efforts of lodge members in the broader community. More than 80 fraternal benefit societies are operating in the United States and Canada today, with over 9 million members and with $380 billion of life insurance in force.

== See also ==
- Fraternity
- Fraternal order
- Friendly society
- Health care sharing ministry
