= Fraternal order =

Fraternity organized as an order

A fraternal order is a voluntary membership organisation structured as an order, typically featuring initiation rituals and elements derived from religious orders, chivalric traditions, guilds, or secret societies. While drawing on these historical models, fraternal orders generally serve secular purposes: functioning as social clubs, cultural organisations, and providers of mutual aid or charitable services. Many friendly societies, benefit societies, and mutual organisations are organised as fraternal orders.

== History ==
The earliest fraternal orders emerged in the eighteenth century in the United Kingdom and the United States, with the Freemasons and Odd Fellows among the most prominent examples. The nineteenth and early twentieth centuries saw a proliferation of new orders, including the Benevolent and Protective Order of Elks, the Fraternal Order of Eagles, the Knights of Pythias, the Independent Order of Foresters, the Knights of Columbus, and the Loyal Order of Moose. By the late nineteenth century, an estimated 350 fraternal orders enrolled more than six million members, representing over a third of adult American men. This period of rapid growth, lasting from roughly 1870 to 1920, is sometimes called the "Golden age of fraternalism".

Fraternal orders have frequently evolved through splits, mergers, and reorganisations. The Independent Order of Foresters, for example, was established in 1874 when it separated from the Ancient Order of Foresters (also known as Foresters Friendly Society), which itself had formed from the Royal Foresters Society in 1834. Such complex histories mean that different, unrelated organisations sometimes share similar names, making the genealogy of fraternal orders difficult to trace.

The Great Depression and the rise of government welfare programmes contributed to a decline in fraternal membership beginning in the 1930s. As the state assumed many of the social insurance functions previously provided by lodges, fraternal orders increasingly emphasised social activities and community service over mutual aid.

== Organisation ==
Fraternal orders are typically divided geographically into local units called lodges, which may be grouped into larger administrative divisions known as provinces or grand lodges. Each lodge generally manages its own affairs while maintaining affiliation with a broader order. Reciprocal agreements between lodges allow members who relocate to join a new lodge without repeating initiation procedures.

The ceremonies and rituals of lodges are generally uniform throughout an order, though individual lodges occasionally change their affiliation, orders merge, or groups of lodges break away to form new organisations.

=== Ritual and symbolism ===
Fraternal orders commonly employ elaborate systems of ritual, symbolism, and regalia. These may include:

- Initiation ceremonies and degrees of membership
- Awards, medals, and decorations
- Styles, offices, and ranks
- Secret greetings, signs, passwords, and oaths
- Distinctive regalia and insignia

These elements often draw on the traditions of chivalric orders, religious orders, and guild systems.

== Types ==
Fraternal orders vary considerably in their purposes and affiliations.

Social and benevolent orders form the largest category, providing fellowship, mutual aid, and charitable activities. Examples include the International Order of the King's Daughters and Sons, the Independent Order of Odd Fellows, the Loyal Order of Moose, and the Independent Order of Rechabites. Many of these orders operated systems of sickness and death benefits, and some established orphanages, hospitals, and homes for the elderly.

Ethnic and religious orders serve particular communities. Christians belonging to any Christian denomination are eligible to join the International Order of the King's Daughters and Sons, which is an interdenominational (ecumenical) Christian fraternal order. Other fraternal orders are separated by Christian denomination; for example, the Ancient Order of Hibernians and Order of Alhambra cater to Irish Catholics, while the Orange Order serves Irish Protestants. The Knights of Columbus is a Catholic fraternal organisation open to Roman Catholic men of all ethnic backgrounds. With regard to Freemasonry and the Odd Fellows, in the past, African Americans, excluded from most white fraternal orders, established parallel organisations such as Prince Hall Freemasonry (founded 1784) and the Grand United Order of Odd Fellows (founded 1843).

Political orders have pursued various ideological agendas, sometimes radical or militant. The Nativist and anti-Catholic Order of the Star Spangled Banner and Order of United Americans were active in the 1840s United States. The Ku Klux Klan, founded in 1866 and refounded in 1915, adopted the structure and rituals of fraternal orders while promoting white supremacy.

Professional orders are organised around specific occupations, such as the Fraternal Order of Police.

Academic orders include fraternities and sororities associated with colleges and universities, which maintain many of the traditions of older fraternal orders.

Humorous or satirical orders parody the conventions of fraternal organisations. E Clampus Vitus, founded in the nineteenth century, mocks the elaborate rituals and grandiose titles of traditional orders.

== See also ==
- List of general fraternities
- List of social fraternities
- List of social sororities and women's fraternities
- Friendly society
- Benefit society
