= Fraternity =

Type of organization, society, or club

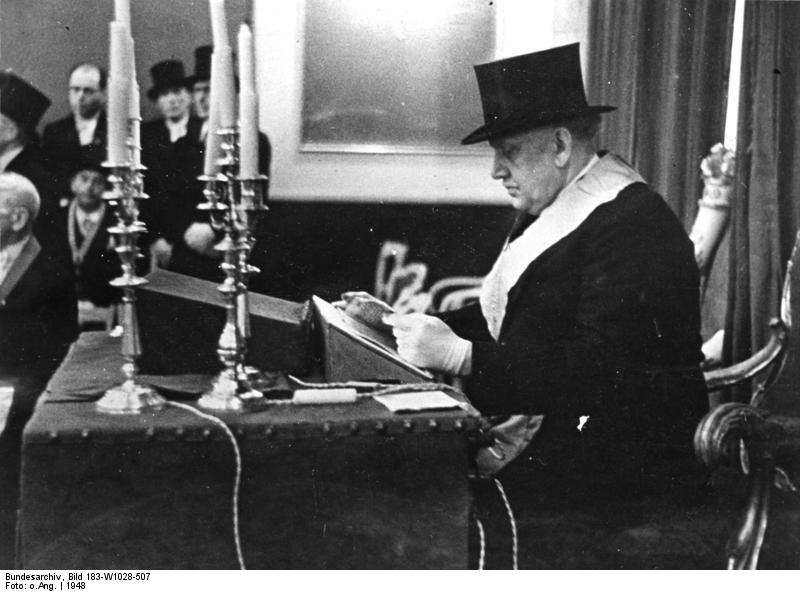
A meeting of Freemasons in West Germany in 1948

A fraternity (from Latin frater 'brother' and -ity; whence, "brotherhood") or fraternal organization is an organization, society, club or fraternal order traditionally of men but also women associated together for various religious or secular aims. The Western concept of fraternities developed in the Christian context, notably with the religious orders in the Catholic Church during the Middle Ages. The concept was eventually further extended with medieval confraternities and guilds. In the early modern era, these were followed by fraternal orders such as Freemasons, the Rosicrucian Society of England, and Odd Fellows, along with gentlemen's clubs, student fraternities, and fraternal service organizations. Members (regardless of gender) are occasionally referred to as a brother or – usually in a religious context – frater or friar.

Today, connotations of fraternities vary according to context including companionships and brotherhoods dedicated to the religious, i.e., (Knights of Columbus), intellectual, academic, physical, or social pursuits of its members. In modern times, it sometimes connotes a secret society especially regarding Freemasonry, Odd Fellows, various academic, and student societies.

Although membership in fraternities was and mostly still is limited to men, this is not always the case. There are mixed male and female orders, as well as wholly female religious orders and societies, some of which are known as sororities in North America. Notable modern fraternities or fraternal orders include some grand lodges operating among freemasons and odd fellows.

== History ==
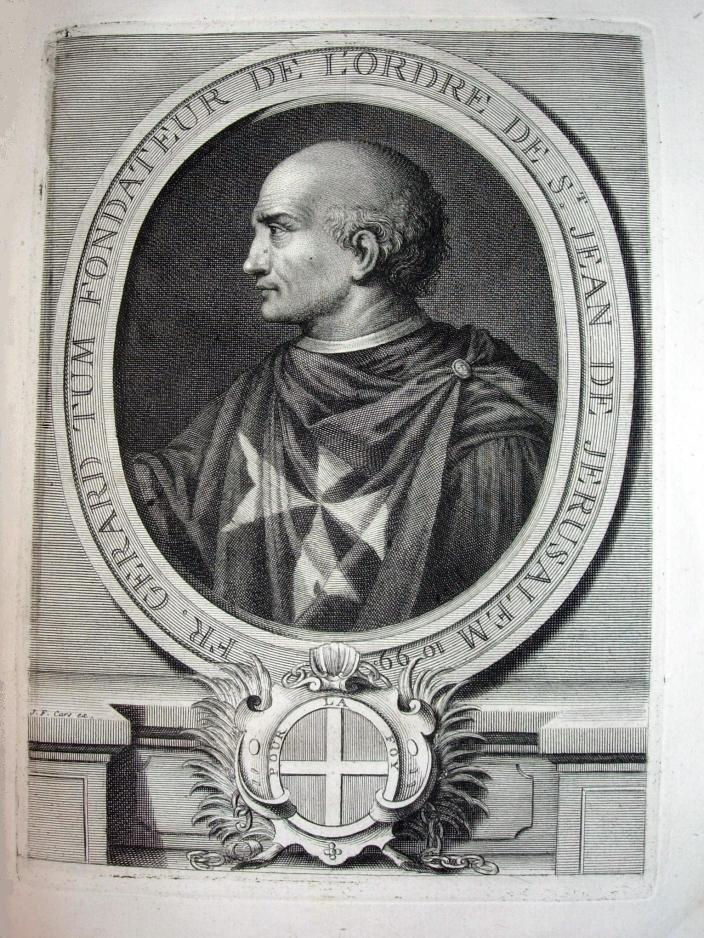
Blessed Gerard Thom (c. 1040–1120), lay brother in the Benedictine order and founder of the Order of Saint John of Jerusalem after the First Crusade in 1099.

There are known fraternal organizations which existed as far back as ancient clan hero and goddess cults of Greek religions and in the Mithraic Mysteries of ancient Rome.

The background of the modern world of fraternities can be traced back to the confraternities in the Middle Ages, which were formed as lay organisations affiliated with the Catholic Church. Some were groups of men and women who were endeavoring to ally themselves more closely with the prayer and activity of the church; others were groups of tradesmen, which are more commonly referred to as guilds. These later confraternities evolved into purely secular fraternal societies, while the ones with religious goals continue to be the format of the modern Third Orders affiliated with the mendicant orders. Other yet took the shape as military orders during the Crusades, which later provided inspiration for elements of quite a few modern fraternal orders.

The development of modern fraternal orders was especially dynamic in the United States, where the freedom to associate outside governmental regulation is expressly sanctioned in law. There have been hundreds of fraternal organizations in the United States, and at the beginning of the 20th century the number of memberships equaled the number of adult males. (Due to multiple memberships, probably only 50% of adult males belonged to any organizations.) This led to the period being referred to as "the Golden age of fraternalism." In 1944 Arthur M. Schlesinger coined the phrase "a nation of joiners" to refer to the phenomenon. Alexis de Tocqueville also referred to the American reliance on private organization in the 1830s in Democracy in America.

There are many attributes that fraternities may or may not have, depending on their structure and purpose. Fraternities can have differing degrees of secrecy, some form of initiation or ceremony marking admission, formal codes of behavior, dress codes disciplinary procedures, very differing amounts of real property and assets.

== Types ==
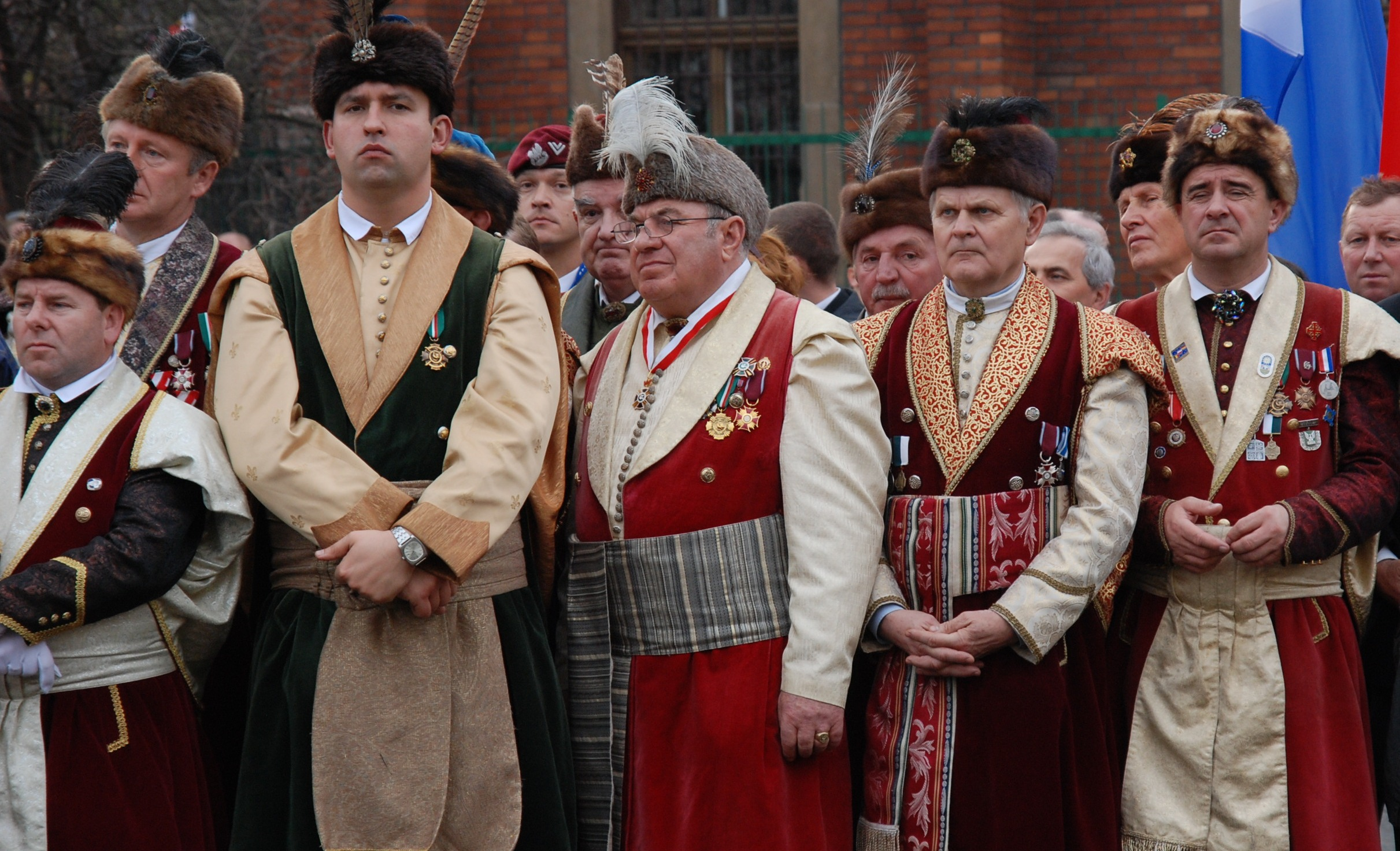
Kraków's Kur Fraternity during the inauguration of Józef Piłsudski Monument in Kraków.

The only true distinction between a fraternity and any other form of social organizations is the implication that the members are freely associated as equals for a mutually beneficial purpose rather than because of a religious, governmental, commercial, or familial bond – although there are fraternities dedicated to each of these fields of association.

On college campuses, fraternities may be divided into four different groups: social, service, professional, and honorary.

Fraternities can be organized for many purposes, including university education, work skills, ethics, ethnicity, religion, politics, charity, chivalry, other standards of personal conduct, asceticism, service, performing arts, family command of territory, and even crime. There is almost always an explicit goal of mutual support. While there have been fraternal orders for the well-off, there have also been many fraternities for those in the lower ranks of society, especially for national or religious minorities. Trade unions also grew out of fraternities such as the Knights of Labor.

The ability to organize freely, apart from the institutions of government and religion, was a fundamental part of the establishment of the modern world. In Living the Enlightenment, Margaret C. Jacobs showed that the development of Jurgen Habermas's "public space" in 17th-century Netherlands was closely related to the establishment of lodges of Freemasons.

=== Trade guilds ===
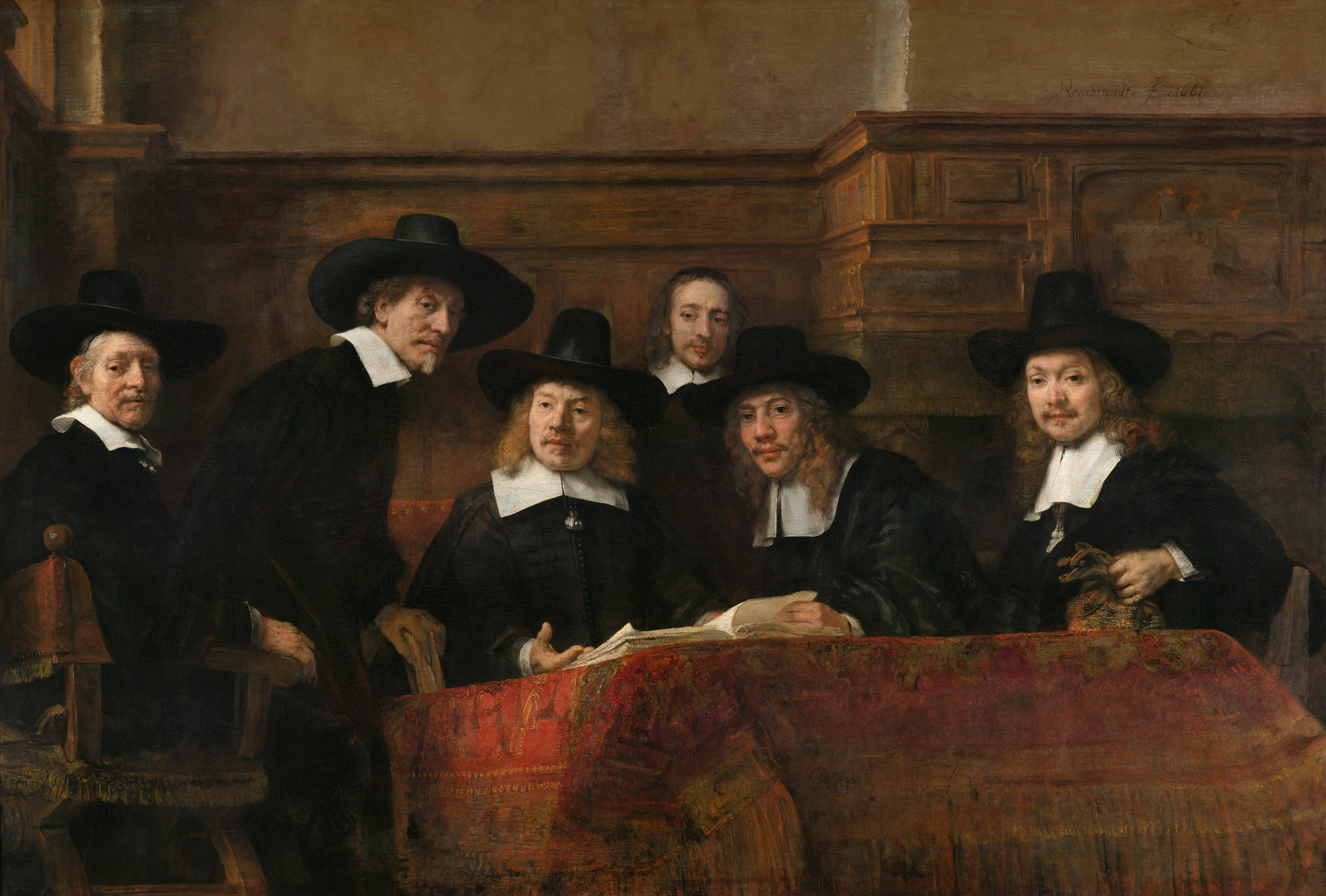
The Syndics of the Drapers' Guild by Rembrandt, 1662.

The development of fraternities in England may have originated with guilds that were the forerunners of trade unions and friendly societies. These guilds were set up to provide insurance for their members at a time when there was no welfare state, trade unions or universal health care. Various secret signs and handshakes were created to serve as proof of their membership allowing them to visit related guilds in other communities.

=== Fraternal orders ===
Square and Compasses of Freemasonry.

In London and other major cities, some Guilds (like the Freemasons and the Odd Fellows) survived by adapting their roles to a social support function. Eventually, these groups evolved in the early 18th century into more philosophical organizations focused on brotherly love and ethical living, with some elements inspired by organisations such as chivalric orders. Among guilds that became prosperous are the Freemasons, Odd Fellows and Foresters. Throughout the latter part of the 19th century and into the 20th century, many American fraternal orders such as the Benevolent and Protective Order of Elks, Loyal Order of Moose, and Fraternal Order of Eagles implemented practices and rituals inspired from orders such as the Freemasons and Odd Fellows. These organisations were segregated and Black organisations were founded that were based on the white ones such as Prince Hall Freemasonry, Grand United Order of Odd Fellows in America, Improved Benevolent and Protective Order of Elks of the World, as well as original fraternal organisations such as the Independent Order of St. Luke.

=== University and college fraternities ===
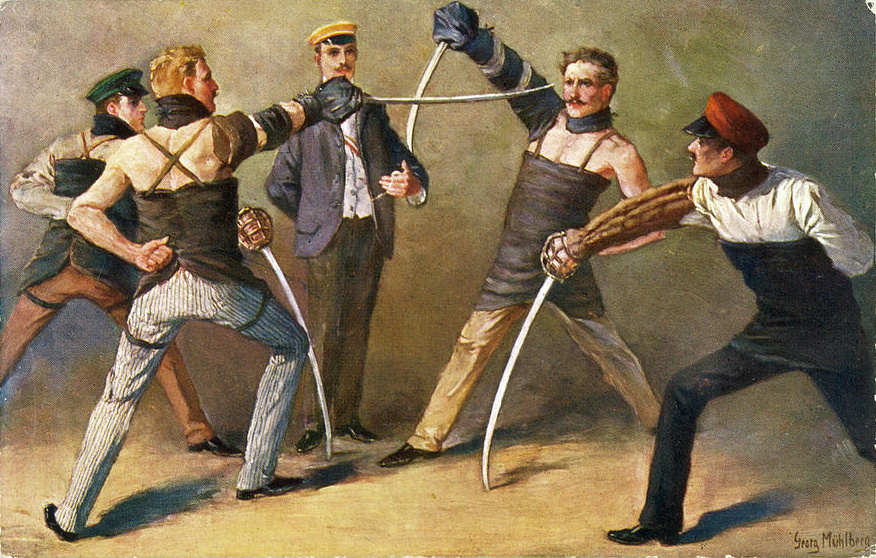
The German Student Corps are known for practicing their tradition of engaging in academic fencing by rules dating back to the 1750s.

Fraternities have a history in American colleges and universities and form a major subsection of the whole range of fraternities. In Europe, students were organized in nations and corporations since the beginnings of the modern university in the late medieval period, but the situation can differ greatly by country.

In the United States, fraternities in colleges date to the 1770s but did not fully assume an established pattern until the 1820s. Many were strongly influenced by the patterns set by Freemasonry. The main difference between the older European organizations and the American organizations is that the American student societies virtually always include initiations, the formal use of symbolism, and a lodge-based organizational structure (chapters).

The oldest active social American college fraternity is the Kappa Alpha Society founded in 1825 at Union College. Sigma Phi Society (1827) and Delta Phi Fraternity (1827) were founded at the same school and comprise the Union Triad. The women's fraternities, now more commonly referred to as sororities, formed beginning in 1851 with the establishment of Alpha Delta Pi as the first women's fraternity.

Expansion to other schools by way of approved chapters operating under a charter or warrant has been the model whereby US fraternities have grown nationally and into Canada. This resulted in the formation of national structures of governance where previously each nascent fraternity had been under the control of its first, often "Alpha" chapter. As fraternities grew larger they outpaced the capacity of volunteer management and began to employ staff, eventually requiring an administrative office. Today, hundreds of national fraternities account for roughly 15,000 active chapters.

Some national groups remain quite small, with only a handful of active groups, while the largest will manage in excess of 300 active chapters. Alternatively, some fraternities remain as local units, often retaining a literary society model that was more prevalent in the 19th century. Fraternities offer a wide variety of services: National chapters and locals may or may not have buildings, and while many are residential, some have properties that are meeting halls only.

Fraternities which provide residential space exhibit an array of services and sizes. Meals may be catered, or served by a full-time staff, but in other cases the members will cook their own meals. Maintenance is typically performed by members, although on some campuses the host institution handles capital improvements. Sorority chapters tend to be larger, with a business model that includes more formal maintenance and support.

Properties may be independently owned by housing corporations, and in the case of some schools these will provide the bulk of residential options for undergraduates; these properties may be on leased or privately held land. Other chapters, often new chapters, are housed in dorms and meet in rented halls.

US fraternities formed in roughly three waves. The "old-line" fraternities are considered those that formed prior to, and during the American Civil War, all of which were Eastern or Southern. The next wave coincided with the period immediately after the Civil War until 1920, organizations normally modeled after the old-line fraternities. After WWII, the most recent wave of formation has largely been on ethnic or multi-cultural lines, which continues today. Prior to the formation of the NIC, NPC and other associations, whole chapters or schismatic groups of members would occasionally break away to form new fraternities as an offshoot of a former national. These national associations were developed, in part, to prevent this practice.

The vast majority of US collegiate institutions recognize fraternities, ranging from a benign tolerance to active support. In Canada, fraternities are only rarely given official recognition, but rather, exist in the campus orbit as independent organizations. A few US campuses have historically banned fraternity participation, a position from which several have backtracked in the face of alumni criticism or ongoing student demand. For example, sororities (only) were banned at Stanford University in 1944 due to "extreme competition", but brought back in response to Title IX in 1977.

Colby College, Amherst College, and a few others are the outliers, where these bans persist. The College of Wooster adopted a Greek ban 100 years ago, but fraternities and sororities there have continued as local organizations. In 2017 Harvard University attempted to ban single-sex clubs, a matter that was met with separate lawsuits in federal and Massachusetts courts. Often, Greek chapters that are suspended or banned will continue as sub rosa organizations.

Since at least the 1940s, fraternities have received increased scrutiny in the United States from incidents of hazing or racism that have received national attention, and on some campuses, such as Florida State, the organizations have been temporarily banned while administrators and national fraternities adjust to resolve these shared challenges.

In Germany the German Student Corps are the oldest academic fraternities. Twenty-eight were founded in the 18th century and two of them still exist. Most of their traditions have not changed much for the past two centuries. These traditions include academic fencing duels with sharp blades while wearing only eye and neck protection, or regular hunting events, as can be seen in examples such as Corps Hubertia Freiburg, Corps Palatia Munich, Corps Rhenania Heidelberg or Corps Bavaria Munich.

At Swedish universities, especially those of Uppsala and Lund, students have organized in student nations since the 16th century. Generally, these organizations are open to all students who wish to join. Parallel to the nations, both Uppsala and Lund play host to a large number of university-related secret societies, for both students and older academics.

There are thriving collegiate fraternity systems in Puerto Rico and in the Philippines.

While traditionally there were not Greek-lettered fraternities and sororities in the United Kingdom, there has been varied attempts to do so, resulting in the modern surge we can see today in professional fraternities across the UK's top universities. The first recorded instance was in 2001, where Alpha Kappa Psi joined the University of Manchester (at the time, University of Manchester Institute of Science and Technology and Victoria University of Manchester - later merging to form the University we know today) and Manchester Metropolitan University. Other fraternities have since tried, such as Zeta Psi (2008), Alpha Epsilon Pi (2011), Zeta Beta Tau (2011), but were unable to maintain a substantial footprint, likely because of cultural differences affecting success of Social fraternities in particular where professional fraternities were able to thrive. Today, there are chapters of Alpha Kappa Psi and Theta Tau, both Professional Co-Ed Fraternities, at various UK universities, namely both the university both were original to, University of Manchester.

== See also ==
- List of general fraternities
- List of social fraternities
- List of social sororities and women's fraternities
- Professional fraternities and sororities
- Service fraternities and sororities
- Gentlemen's club
- Country club
- Dining club
- Literary societies
- Student society
- Supper club
