= List of North American ethnic and religious fraternal orders =

Below is an annotated list of North American ethnic and religious fraternal orders.

== Ethnic ==
=== African American ===
- African Blood Brotherhood
- Afro-American Order of Owls
- Afro-American Order of Red Men
- Christian Knights and Heroines of Ethiopia of the East and West Hemispheres - This organization was incorporated in the probate court of Mobile County, Alabama, in 1915. The unique name was noticed by several publications including Law Notes, the Sacred Heart Review and the Fortnightly Review.
- Colored Brotherhood and Sisterhood of Honor - Founded in Franklin, Kentucky, in 1886 as a social and mutual benefit society. Listed in the 1890 census. Extinct by 1923.
- Colored Consolidated Brotherhood - a mutual benefit society headquartered at Atlanta, Texas. Listed in the 1890 census
- Fraternal Order of Hawks - Also called the Improved, Benevolent Order of Hawks, this was an African American order that may have been modeled on the Fraternal Order of Eagles. Known to be active in Virginia and Oregon.
- Grand United Order of Odd Fellows in America and the women's auxiliary, Household of Ruth
- Grand United Order of True Reformers - Founded in 1873 in Kentucky and Alabama, an African American fraternal organization that was White-led by the Independent Order of Good Templars.
- Grand Fountain of the United Order of True Reformers – Founded in c. 1875 in Richmond, Virginia, by the Rev. William Washington Browne. It reached the 70,000 members by 1900, and by that time had also contributed $2 million in benefits and relief.
- Improved Benevolent and Protective Order of Elks
- Independent Benevolent and Protective Order of Moose
- Independent Order of Good Samaritans and Daughters of Samaria - Founded September 14, 1847, as a temperance order in New York City by I. W. B. Smith. It was an authorized branch of the white Grand United Order of Good Samaritans which had been founded that March. Had initiated over 400,000 members by 1897. It was described as having educational as well as mutual benefit aspects including sickness, death, disability, and old age benefits. In 1897 the Order had lodges in every US state and England. Its logo was a dove and olive branch enclosed in a triangle with the words Love, Purity, and Truth emblazoned on them. This symbolized perfection, equality, and the trinity. The Orders headquarters were in Washington, DC.
- Improved Order of the Shepherds and Daughters of Bethlehem - Founded in 1910 in Richmond, Virginia.
- Independent Order of Immaculates of the United States of America - Founded June 23, 1872, in Nashville, Tennessee, by W. A. Hadley. Evolved from Young Men's Immaculate Association but was different in that it was patterned after secret fraternal orders and that it admitted men and women. Had about 5,000 members in 1897. Headquartered in Nashville.
- Independent Order of Saint Luke - Based in Richmond, Virginia. Had 49,498 members at the end of 1921. Attempts to reach it in 1923 were unsuccessful.
- International Order of Twelve Knights and Daughters of Tabor
- Knights of Peter Claver - Founded in 1909 by members of Most Pure Heart of Mary Catholic Church in Mobile, Alabama, as a Black Catholic fraternal order, as Blacks were barred from the Knights of Columbus due to their race. Among the founders were The Rev. John H. Dorsey (the second Black Catholic priest ordained in the US), several White priests, and three Black parishioners.
- Knights of Pythias of North America, South America, Europe, Asia, Africa and Australia and the women's auxiliary organization, Order of Calanthe
- Mosaic Templars of America
- Order of Galilean Fishermen - Founded in 1856 in Baltimore, Maryland, by Hemsley Nichols. One of the oldest orders of its kind, by 1897 it was also one of the wealthiest with $125,000 in lodges, land, personal property and bonds. By that time it had 56,000 members in lodges "from New England to the Gulf." Men and women were admitted. The Order paid sick and death benefits which in 1897 were $5 per day for sickness and $300 to $400 for death. Claimed to be of Masonic origin, its emblem used a fish, cross rose and the letters INRI, similar to the 18th degree in Scottish Rite Masonry. Local lodges were called "Tabernacles." active into the 1980s.
- Prince Hall Freemasonry and the auxiliary groups, Prince Hall Order of the Eastern Star and Heroines of Jericho. Also, splinter groups such as National Grand Lodge Free & Accepted Ancient York Masons Prince Hall Origin National Compact USA
- Supreme Camp of American Woodmen
- United African Brotherhood - Organized in Clinton, Texas. Attempts to contact by mail in the late 1890s failed.
- United Brothers of Friendship - Founded August 1, 1861, by young local students in day or night schools. In 1868, on the advice of their teacher, W.H. Gibson, the society reorganized. Many chapters were formed in Kentucky, and a statewide Grand Lodge was formed in 1871. After establishing chapters outside Kentucky a National Grand Lodge was formed. W.H. Gibson served as the first State Grand Master for five years and as National Grand Master for four years. Unofficial female auxiliaries were called the Sisters of Friendship until 1878 when the organization formed the official Sisters of the Mysterious Ten, organized in local Temples. In 1878 the Order had about 4,000 members. That was the year they decided to establish another auxiliary, the Knights of Friendship, based on the story of David and Jonathan. In 1892 the UBF had 100,000 members in 19 states and 2 territories with 30,000 in Missouri alone. It was known to be active in Kentucky, Missouri, Arkansas, Louisiana, Texas, Mississippi, Alabama, Tennessee, West Virginia, Virginia, the District of Columbia, Pennsylvania, New York, New Jersey, Michigan, Kansas, Colorado, Washington, Canada, the West Indies and Africa. While predominantly black, the order had white members. There was evidence that the Grand United Order of Odd Fellows had something to do with its founding.
- United Knights and Daughters of America - Headquartered in St. Louis, Missouri. Reportedly had many members in the Midwest. Attempts to contact the order in 1923 were unsuccessful.
- Universal Negro Improvement Association and African Communities League

=== American Indian ===
- Alaska Native Brotherhood
- Brotherhood of North American Indians - Founded by Richard C. Adams of the Delaware Tribe of Oklahoma on December 5, 1911, in Washington, DC. Membership was open to people of Indian blood. Those married to Indians, the President of the United States, the Commissioner of Indian Affairs, and other public officials could become honorary members, without vote. The Brotherhood advocated giving Indians the right to vote and granting them citizenship, the placement of Indian children in public school, more Indians working at the Bureau of Indian Affairs, and Indian representation in Congress. The national convention in Washington would elect 20 national chiefs, a Great Sachem, a Chief Historian, and a Great Chaplain. The Brotherhood collapsed in 1913.
- Daughters of Sacajawea - Organized in the 1920s, possibly as the New York City chapter of the Teepee Order of America. Both groups were founded by Red Fox Francis St. James, which created difficulties, as he was intolerant of Catholics and blacks, so Catholic Indians and those that had black ancestry opposed his groups. In 1926, Princess Chinquilla, a Cheyenne woman, was the "Great Sacajawea" of the group and worked with St. James to create an Indian cultural center in New York, but the project fell through.
- Loyal Order of Tecumseh - Founded by Arthur C. Parker as a society within the Society of American Indians to provide a common ground for those with greater and lesser degrees of Indian blood. Members of the group held no voting privileges, so they could not affect the outcome of the parent group. The Order evolved into other fraternal groups during the 1920s.
- Teepee Order of America - Founded in 1915 by Red Fox Francis St. James, an alleged Blackfoot Indian. Open to Indians and non-Indians from the US, Canada, and Latin America, it excluded blacks and European immigrants. Originally similar to the Boy Scouts of America in appealing to youth and "focusing on Indian activities and ceremonies that were romantic in nature." It was a Pan-Indian group, but not as successful as the Society of American Indians, though there was some membership overlap. It advocated for Native American citizenship and questioned the efficacy of the Bureau of Indian Affairs.

=== English ===
- Order, Sons of St. George - Organized after the Civil War by Englishmen in the anthracite coal-mining region of Pennsylvania to counter the Molly Maguires. The organization "took permanent shape" at Scranton in 1871. Membership was open to "Englishmen, their sons, and grandsons, wherever born". Beneficiary membership was limited to those between 18 and 50; those over 50 were allowed honorary membership. The Order required belief in a Supreme Being, reverence for the Holy Bible, and loyalty to one's adopted country. By 1896 the order had about 35,000 members in the United States, Canada, and Hawaii. Ritual based on the legend of St. George included a "language of words, signs and grips" that the member learned upon initiation which could identify him to other members of the order. The Orders emblem was St. George conquering the dragon. The system of sick benefits varied by the lodge and the inclination of members. There was also a funeral benefit for members and their wives and a benevolent fund for brethren and "any worthy Englishman in distress". Some lodges also provided physicians and medicine for sick members. There was also a female auxiliary, the Daughters of St. George, but it was not officially recognized by the Supreme Lodge. In 1923 the Order was accused of promoting pro-British propaganda in textbooks used in New York by a representative of Mayor John Francis Hylan.
- Sons of England Benevolent Society - Fraternal order for Canadians of English descent.

=== French ===
- Union Saint-Jean-Baptiste - Founded March 27, 1900 in Woonsocket, Rhode Island, as the Union Saint-Jean-Baptiste d'Amerique for Roman Catholic Franco-Americans. Activities include hospital volunteer work, comforting the bereaved, visiting shut-ins, and working in Catholic Action. The Saint-Jean-Baptiste Educational Foundation provides scholarships; the group also helps fund the Catholic Communications Foundation whose mission was to spread understanding of the Catholic faith and doctrine in the mass media. Headquarters was Woonsocket. The motto is "In Union there is strength". Lodges are called local councils, and the national convention is "National Congress". There was a ritual for initiation and the installation of officers. 62,000 members in 1968, 47,000 in January 1979. Merged with Catholic Family Life in 1991.
- Association Canado-Americaine - Founded in 1896 in Manchester, New Hampshire, which remained the organization's headquarters. Lodges were called Courts, regions District Courts, highest body "Supreme Court" which met quadrennially. A "High Court" administered the group in between sessions of the Supreme Court and determined district boundaries. Motto: "Religion, Patriotism, and Fraternity." The Association had rituals for initiation, installation, and other rites; the rituals reflected the Catholic values of the society whose patron was St. John the Baptist. The organization offered beneficiary and social membership; the former consisted of adult and infant divisions, the infants becoming adult members when they turned 18. There was also honorary membership bestowed on those who had made unusual services to the Catholic faith, social or economic science, the arts, education, French culture generally, or to any other ideal of the association. 1967 membership 30,424; 1979 membership 26,000. Absorbed Foresters Franco Americains in 1939. The ACA went into rehabilitation in 2008 and later was liquidated. Most of its insurance policies were assumed by the Royal Arcanum.

=== German ===
- Alliance of Transylvania Saxons - Founded as the Siebenburger Bund on July 5, 1902. On August 31 of the same year became the Central Verband der Siebenburger Sachsen. Adopted current name in 1965. Headquarters in Cleveland, lodges called branches; there were 43 in 1978. The national convention meets annually. Membership was open to those "of Transylvanian Saxon birth or descent thereof, or married to a Saxon of descendent thereof, or of German birth or descendent thereof" ages 16–60 who were also healthy enough to pass the insurance requirements and of sound mind and habits and high moral caliber. The Transylvanian Saxon Juniors Association was founded in 1931 to provide insurance for youth. The TSJA also conducts track and field, swim meets golf, softball, and bowling. Saturday German study classes for youth began in 1925. No rituals, but local Branches have their brief initiation ceremonies. Sponsored the Saxon Basketball League in 1927. Charitable activities included helping repatriate Saxon POWs in Siberia to Saxony in 1918; in 1920 it sent $33,000 to Saxon National School in Hermannstadt, a school for orphans, now has its orphan fund. Sent $22,000 in 1970–1971 to Romania for flood relief. 9,871 members in 1967, 8,629 members in 1976 8,892 members in 1989. Membership had stabilized at around 10,000 for decades.
- Ancient Order of Freesmiths - Claimed to be descended from the Vehmgericht of medieval Germany. The first known lodge in the United States was founded in Baltimore in 1865. Subsequent lodges were formed in Washington, D.C., and Philadelphia in 1866 and 1867 respectively. By the late 1890s, the Order was said to have members in almost every state of the Union. State divisions were called Grad Lodges, and the national organization was controlled by a Supreme Lodge of the United States that met "one the first hour of every leap year." Lodge rooms were called Smithies, the presiding officer was titled Sun, the second-in-command was the moon, and other officials had names based on the planets and other bodies in the firmament. The order worked nine degrees, six lower, called the Free Smiths, and three higher degrees - Grand Marshal, Grand Master, and Cavalier - which were open to members who had been in the Order longer and were entitled to wear colored sashes and swords. The motto of the order was Truth, Fidelity, and Security. The order also paid sick and death benefits. Correspondence sent to Baltimore in May 1923 by Arthur Preuss went unanswered.
- Bavarian National Association of North America - Founded 1884, incorporated in New York. In 1923 the Association had c.3,500 members in 56 lodges; membership "not strictly limited to", natives of Bavaria and their descendants. "Supreme Office" at 749 Broadway, Buffalo, New York. Merged with Unity Life and Accident Insurance Association in 1934.
- GUG Germania - Gegenseite Unterstutzungsgeselshaft Germania, founded in 1888 and incorporated the same year in Wisconsin, in which state they confined their operations. Their mission, in their words "for the purpose of mutual aid in cases of sickness, accident and death of its members or their families". In 1923 it had 8,000 members in 60 subordinate societies; that year it had a capital of over $500,000, with a further $100,000 in sick benefit funds held by local societies. All policy decisions are determined by a "Central Society" made up of the officers, founders, and representatives of the subordinate lodges. A central society meets at stated intervals to elect officers to administer the group and make needed changes. Membership is open to men 18–50, of good moral character who have passed medical exams, regardless of religious or political creeds. Germania stated that it "is not a secret society. No pass-words or grips feature its work. In fact, any man is welcome to join its meetings."
- German Order of Harugari
- Greater Beneficial Union of Pittsburgh - Incorporated April 14, 1892 in Allegheny County, Pennsylvania, as the Deutscher Unter-stuetzungs-Bund, within a month had 243 members in 6 districts. Began the periodical, Union Reporter, the next year, now known as GBU Reporter. Rituals include the candidate signing an application and the president of the local lodge giving an address about the privileges of membership and how one should enter the lodge. Union claimed to be non-sectarian and had no secrets; open to all "well-meaning persons"; non-members accompanied by members allowed at meeting. Locals are "Districts"; national convention meets quadrennially; headquarters in Pittsburgh; in 1979 had $120,000,000 in insurance; also sponsored outings, baseball games, etc. While originally for German men and women, by 1979 the Union was open to men and women of all ethnic backgrounds. In 1923 the Union had 54,000 members, 50,000 in 1965, and 37,000 in 1979.
- Improved Order, Knights of Pythias
- Independent Order of Red Men
- North American Swiss Alliance - Founded July 14, 1865, as the Grütli Bund der Vereinigten Staaten von Nord Amerika in Cincinnati. Became Nordamerikanishcher Schweizerbund in July 1911. National convention meets quadrennially, locals are called branches or lodges. Open to Swiss, Swiss descendants, or spouses of Swiss. Membership 2,000 in 1965, 4,000 in 1978 and 3,350 in 1994, about 10 to 15% are social, uninsured members. Periodical originally called Gruetlianer changed to Der Schweizer in 1911. Headquarters in Cleveland in 1979, but it was an "organization on wheels" moving to several places every few years in the late 19th century
- Schwarzer Ritter, Deutscher Orden - Claimed great antiquity, though in 1899 it was said to have been present in the United States for about 30 years. Active in New York, New Jersey, Pennsylvania, and the District of Columbia.
- Sons of Hermann
- United League of America
- Workmen's Benefit Fund - Founded as the Workmen's Sick and Death Benefit Fund in 1884, this organization was licensed to provide insurance in February 1899. The current name was adopted in 1939. Membership opened to non-Germans in 1976. Locals are called "Branches," regional groups are called "Districts," and national convention meets quadrennially. "Supreme Office" reported to be at 9 Seventh Street, New York in 1923. Reported to be in Brooklyn in the 1970s. Now at 399 Conklin Street - Suite 310 Farmingdale. Two Chicago-based German groups have merged into the WBF - the Mutual Benefit Aid Society and American Fraternal Insurance Society founded by Volga Germans. Two Jewish groups have merged into the WBF, the Free Sons of Israel in 2001 and the Workmen’s Circle in 2004. Among its activities were providing scholarships, donating to charities, and operating a convalescent home, summer camp, and home for the aged. It also offers "usual line of fraternal insurance and benevolence for its members" Had 384 lodges and 53,139 benefit members in 1923, 53,000 in 1965, 35,000 on December 31, 1978 and 15,000 in 1995.

=== Greek ===
- American Hellenic Educational Progressive Association
- Pancretan Association of America
- Pan-Icarian Brotherhood

=== Hispanic ===
- Alianza Hispano-Americana - Founded January 14, 1894, in Tucson, Arizona. The Supreme Lodge was incorporated under the laws of Arizona in October 1902. The first Supreme President was M. G. Samaniego, whose term lasted a year. He was succeeded by Samuel Brown, who continued in office until at least August 1918. The original death benefit was a levy assessment on all members in the event of the death of a single member. In 1907 the benefit scheme was changed to a reserve fund system. A table of rates was adopted in 1910 and women were allowed in 1913. Headquarters were at the AHA Building in Tucson, under the care of a Supreme Secretary. The Alienza was run by the Supreme Executive Council which included the Supreme Secretary, as well as a Medical Director, Counselor, and Treasurer. The "field men" were under the control of a General Organizer based in El Paso. In 1918 it was reportedly the largest Spanish American organization in the country. In 1923 it had 109 branches, 5,189 members and operated in Arizona, New Mexico, Texas, California, Colorado, and Nevada.

=== Hungarian ===
- American Hungarian Catholic Society - Founded in 1894. Headquarters in Cleveland. Aside from insurance, they assist aged members, visit sick and bereaved, and provide service to local parishes. 1965 members 2,430; 1977 members 1,200.
- Hungarian Reformed Federation of America
- Verhovay Fraternal Insurance Association - Founded in Pennsylvania as Verhovay Aid Association, changed name in 1935 21,512 members at the end of 1922, and at that time was headquartered in Hazleton, Pennsylvania. It had 40,000 members in 1955 the same year it merged with William Penn
- William Penn Association

=== Irish ===
- Ancient Order of Hibernians
- Knights of Equity
- St. Patrick's Alliance of America - Founded in 1868 by members of the Friendly Sons of St. Patrick and other groups, mostly Irish Catholic. However, the Alliance's ritual emphasized freedom of religion and denounced bigotry from any source. Other elements were borrowed from the Foresters and other like groups. The Alliance's emblem was a disc showing the tree of life and the letters S. P. A. of A. The Alliance provided sick and death benefits and benefits for the loss of a wife. Membership was open to all regardless of political or religious belief as long as one was of Irish descent. There were a reported 50,000 members concentrated in "New England, Middle, Pacific Coast, and some other States". The National Secretary was based in Newark, New Jersey

=== Italian ===
- Italian Sons and Daughters of America Fraternal Association, formerly the Italo-American National Union
- Sons of Italy
- Venetian Fraternal Union - Founded in 1924 as the Unione Veneziana, this group had 862 members in 1928. Provided free medical care and sickness allowances.

=== Jewish ===
- Ahavas Israel - Founded in New York in 1890. Paid sick and death benefits for members and their wives. The emblem was a pair of clasped hands. Founders included Masons, Oddfellows, members of the Sons of Benjamin and the Independent Order of B'rith Abraham.
- American Star Order - Founded in New York in 1884, this was an order for Romanian American Jews and their wives. In 1899 had 5,500 members, half of which were female. Paid sickness and death benefits. Motto: "Charity, Harmony, and Brotherly Love". The emblem was a five-pointed star containing three Hebrew letters with the Roman numeral XIII below and the letter G above.
- B'nai Zion - also known as the Order of the Sons of Zion, B'nai Zion was founded in 1908 as the first explicitly Zionist fraternal order. Membership open to non-Jews since at least 1979. Had a benefit membership of 3,619 in 57 lodges in 1923. Had 24,000 members in the late 1960s, 40,000 in 115 chapters in 1979. 34,000 members in 1989. Headquarters in 1923 at 44 E. 23rd Street, New York City. Current headquarters at 136 East 39th Street. Licensed to sell insurance in 11 states, benefits include hospitalization and medical policies and retirement plans. Zionist work through B'nai Zion Foundation: sells Israel Bonds, sponsored Kfar B'nau Zion agricultural settlement with 500 members, an artist colony near Haifa, school of applied arts and hostel for art students, also built home for mentally challenged children in Israel. Annual award dinner for someone who promoted the ideals of Zionism and Americanism - honorees have included Gerald Ford, Robert F. Kennedy, Hugh Scott, and Frank Church. Through its American Israel Friendship League it distributed books and periodicals to over 2,000 university libraries, sponsored seminars, and discussion groups. Absorbed B'rith Abraham in 1981.
- Free Sons of Israel - Originally Independent Order of Free Sons of Israel. The first lodge was established on January 10, 1849, in New York at the corner of Ridge and Houston Street. It was named Noah #1 after Mordecai Noah. A Constitutional Grand Lodge was convened on March 10 and 22 outlining the rules for order, regalia, and the process for creating subordinate lodges. Abraham Lodge #2 was instituted on May 7, 1849, and later that year Reuben Lodge #3 was joined by 30 former members of Struve Lodge #17 of the German Order of the Harugari. On April 15, 1865, the Order took part in the New York funeral ceremonies for Abraham Lincoln. Throughout the nineteenth century membership was restricted to Jewish men, but unofficial female auxiliaries did spring up. By the late 1970s women were accepted as regular members. The order had 453 members in 7 lodges in 1856, and 928 in 10 lodges in 1863, all within the state of New York. The first lodge outside of New York was Benjamin #15 in Philadelphia, on July 30, 1865. In 1899 the Order had 15,000 members in 104 lodges spread across 21 states. In 1923 the order had 6,645 members in 78 lodges. In the late 1960s and 1979 the Order's membership was reported as 10,000, though the number of lodges fell from 46 to 42 during the same period. The Free Sons had 8,000 members in 1994. In 1923 its headquarters were at 21 W. 124th Street, New York City. The Grand Lodge's current home is 37th Street near 6th Avenue, sharing office space with the Workmens Circle. National convention meets triennially. The Order is led by a "Grand Master", and the other "grand lodge" officers have a "grand" prefix. Has secret rituals, initiation ceremonies, and passwords. Motto "Friendship, Love Truth". Offers members "usual life insurance" benefits; also a Free Sons credit union which gives members low-interest loans. The Order sponsors a scholarship program for Jewish students who show high proficiency in Hebrew, sponsors blood banks, bond drives for United Jewish Appeal, distributes toys for handicapped kids, homes for seniors, convalescent homes and "summer camps for elderly citizens and needy children". There is also a Free Sons Athletic Association which sponsors youth baseball, softball, basketball, bowling, ping pong, golf, and track and field.
- Improved Order of B'nai B'rith - Founded in 1887 in Baltimore by two lodges of the Independent Order of B'nai B'rith who were dissatisfied with the leadership. Originally had 230 members. By 1899 it had spread to some of the larger cities in the United States east of the Mississippi and had approximately 3,000 members. Membership is open to Hebrew men only. It insured the lives of its members for $1,000 and that of members' wives for half that amount. Sick benefits were administered by the subordinate lodges and death benefits by the Supreme Lodge. The ritual was based on the covenant between God, Noah, Abraham, and Moses. The emblem was the All Seeing Eye above three pillars with the tablets of the Ten Commandments between them.
- Independent Order of B'rith Abraham - Founded in 1887 as a split from the Order of Brith Abraham, whose leadership they felt was incompetent. Some sources give the name as the Improved Order of B'rith Abraham. Admitted women and was smoothly run. Added social membership option to what was already essentially an insurance society in 1924. Had a peak membership of 206,000 in 1917. In 1923 it had 585 lodges and a benefit membership of 142,812. Had 58,000 immediately before World War II. Changed name to simply B'rith Abraham in 1968. Merged with B'nai Zion in 1981. Headquarters in 1923 at 37 Seventh Street New York City. New York was still the headquarters in 1979. The Order's stated objectives in 1969 were to "foster fraternity in the context of Jewish ideals, tradition, and welfare", provide fraternal benefits to its members, and support programs for underprivileged children and seniors. It also promoted Zionism.
- Independent Order of American Israelites - Founded in 1894 in New York City by a group of men, some or all of whom had been members of the Independent Order, Free Sons of Israel, and the Sons of Benjamin. Order paid a $1,000 death benefit for male members and $500 for female members. Sick benefits were administered by the subordinate lodges. In 1899 it was limited to the United States and had 3,000 men and 2,500 women members. The orders seal was a spread eagle with a shield holding an American flag and the words "Liberty, Equality, Fraternity" emblazoned on it.
- Independent Order of B'nai B'rith
- Independent Order of B'rith Sholom - Founded in 1905 to assist Jewish immigrants to the US. As Jewish immigration increased, it became more of a human rights organization. Membership open to Jews and gentiles over 16. Female auxiliary named B'rith Sholom Women. Had 52,596 members in 1917. Had 20,000 members in 1979. 6,000 members in 1988. Headquarters in 1917 was at 510-512 5th Street, Philadelphia. Headquarters still at Philadelphia in 1979, when the order had 130 lodges and three statewide organizations. They had a secret ritual, but it was only used by a few lodges. Offers scholarships. Did not have an insurance fund, per se, but offered death and burial benefits and financial aid when members were in need; also taught English language and Americanization. The group saved 50 children aged 5 to 14 during the Holocaust; these were housed at a Camp Sholom. Operates a retirement home in Philadelphia that housed 500. Sponsors Albert Einstein College of Medicine at Yeshiva University and a recuperation center for Israeli soldiers in Haifa. Contributed a 65-acre (26 ha) tract of land for Eagleville Sanatorium.
- Independent Order of Sons of Abraham - Founded in 1892 by a group of Jewish men who were already members of the Masons, Sons of Benjamin, and the Order of B'rith Abraham. Membership in 1899 almost exclusively in New York and Brooklyn, numbered about 2,400 divided equally between men and women.
- Independent Order of Sons of Benjamin - Founded in 1877 in New York by a group of men who were already members of the Brith Abraham. By 1899 it had spread to the "principal cities of the United States and the Dominion of Canada." It authorized the creation of female lodges, of which there were about 20 in 1899. In 1899 there were about 18,000 male members and 2,500 women. In 1918 it had 800 members in 25 lodges, of which 450 were located in New York City with 18 lodges. Its headquarters in 1918 were at 953 Third Avenue. Offered the "usual secret society forms, and privileges". The emblem was a triangle between the letters F and P with an L under it. Offered insurance against death under the Metropolitan Life Insurance Company.
- Independent Western Star Order - Founded in 1894. The Eastern Division was headquartered at 40 Rivington Street. Had 21,000 members in 1918, with 2000 members in 24 lodges in New York City. Offered accident, death, and burial insurance May or may not be related to an order of the same name operating out of Chicago.
- Independent Workmens Circle - Founded in 1906 in Boston. Open to working men and women and "those in sympathy with the cause of labor". In 1923 had 77 lodges with 5,726 benefit members. Headquarters 86 Leverett Street, Boston. "Took up the cooperative movement" at its annual convention in 1919. Moved into its new 4-story building in the West End at the corner of Leverett and Ashland Street and moved in on November 13, 1920. The building contained the group's offices, cooperative grocery, creamery, shoe and dry goods store, and printing plant. The "Co-operative Wholesale Society" consisting of the "Finnish, Lithuanian, and Italian Co-operative of New England" had its offices and warehouse in this building as well.
- Jewish Progressive Order - Headquartered in Philadelphia. Supported the Palestine Restoration Fund by a "shekel tax" of 25 cents per member.
- Jewish National Workers Alliance
- Order of Brith Abraham - Founded in New York in 1859. Originally restricted to Reform Jews. Female lodges, consisting of the female relatives of members of the order, could be formed with the sanction of the Grand Lodge and could elect one of the Past Presidents of the male lodges as their officers. In 1899 there were 11,000 regular members and 1,000 members of the female lodges. 8,000 regular members and three-fifths of the 160 lodges were located in New York City. In 1923 it had 198 lodges, 15,152 benefit members, and 195 social members. It had 8,000 members when it became defunct in 1927. Headquarters in 1923 located at 266-268 Grand Street New York City. The ceremony of the order was calculated to inculcate the values of harmony, wisdom, and justice. The order's emblem was an "interlaced triangle" with a representation of Abraham about to sacrifice Jacob. The order offered sickness and death insurance, assuring its members would be buried by Jewish law and become good American citizens.
- Order of United Hebrew Brothers - Founded in 1915. in 1917 was reported to have 1,800 members and 12 lodges in New York City. Orders stated objectives included promoting social intercourse, discussions of subjects relating to their community, and acting upon them. Provided free burials, helped members in distress, and encouraged enrollment in the Postal Life Insurance Company.
- United Order of True Sisters - Founded by Henrietta Bruckman, wife of a prominent New York doctor, with 12 other ladies to assist Hebrew housewives. Had 5,991 members in 21 lodges in 1918. Had 12,000 members in 1995. Headquarters in New York. National structure called "Grand Lodge". Has degrees, secret ritual regalia, etc. Originally German-speaking, the first English lodge was organized in 1892, by 1918 German language was "essentially discontinued in all lodges". Although originally a benevolent society for sick and widows, by the late 1970s, had become primarily a philanthropic group, particularly with cancer-related causes. The United Order True Sister Inc, Cancer Service created in 1947, contributes $300,000 a year to cancer patients and specialized care hospitals in 13 and Israel.
- Workmen's Circle

=== Lithuanian ===
- Association of Lithuanian Workers - Founded in 1930. In 1972 the Association had 100 locals. By 1979 this had dropped to 80. In 1965 the ALW had 4,555; this dropped to 1,000 in 8 states in 1979. In 1994 it had 1,800 members. Headquarters in Ozone Park, Queens. National convention meets biennially. Women's groups called "sororities", carried out the group's charity work. Conducts "fraternal social and cultural activities" including three scholarships per year for its members.
- Lithuanian Alliance of America - The idea for forming this society first came up in the Lietuwiszka Gazieta of New York on August 16, 1879. The constituting convention was held in Plymouth, Pennsylvania, on November 22, 1886, from Polish and Lithuanian parish societies. Originally meant to be a joint Polish-Lithuanian society, but after "heated discussion" the convention decided that American Lithuanians were "badly in need of de-Polonized churches". In the early 1900s, there was tension between the lay and the clergy leading to the split of the Lithuanian Socialist Federation. Communist sympathizers within the group revolted in 1920, and there was a warning against Communist infiltration in 1925; "progressives" also apparently disrupted many lodges and brought litigation in the 1930s. Headquartered in New York. National convention meets biennially. Had 12,492 members in 303 lodges and 425 in the Juvenile Department in 1923. 22,332 members in 332 lodges throughout 24 states. Had 270 lodges in 1972 and 209 lodges in 1979 with 6,563 members. Had 5,000 in 1994. Open to people of Lithuanian descent; sponsors Lithuanian cultural programs, gives aid to widows, and orphans, relief for victims of natural disasters, and awards scholarships. On July 1, 2012, the insurance aspects of the organization passed to the Croatian Fraternal Union. A Special Convention convened on September 22, 2012, authorized the leadership to reconstitute the LAA as a not-for-profit cultural group.
- Lithuanian Catholic Alliance - Founded in 1886 as the Lithuanian Roman Catholic Alliance of America, adopted its current name in 1975. Headquarters in Wilkes-Barre, Pennsylvania. National convention meets triennially. There were 163 lodges in 1972 and 147 in 1977. 1965 membership was 7,000, which declined to 4,000 in 1979. In 1994 there were 3,069 members, despite membership being opened to non-Catholics. Sponsors Lithuanian cultural activities, cookbooks, films, and radio programs; also sponsors scholarships for members, supports Community Chest, blood donor clinics, Catholic youth programs, youth camps, and Catholic Social Services.

=== Portuguese ===
- Luso-American Financial - A Fraternal Benefit Society - Founded in 1868 as the Portuguese Protective and Benevolent Association of the City and County of San Francisco. Grand Council, most likely a state organization, was founded in 1872, and Supreme Council in 1921. Changed name to Benevolent Society of California in 1948. Women were admitted in 1945. Merged with the Uniao Portuguesa Continental do Estado da California (f.1917) in 1957 to become United National Life Insurance Society, later adopted its current name. Reincorporated in 1975. Luso-American Fraternal Federation founded in 1957 to administer fraternal aspect. Administers Luso-American Educational Foundation which grants scholarships to students interested in Portuguese history and culture. Headquarters in Oakland, lodges called "Subordinate lodges" which were present in California, Nevada, Massachusetts, Connecticut, and Rhode Island. In 1978 it had 14,000 members. In 1994 it was reported to have 15,000. Membership is open to Americans of Portuguese descent or birth.
- Society of the Holy Spirit of the State of California - Founded in Santa Clara, California, in 1895. Headquartered in Santa Clara. Lodges are called Subordinate Councils; the highest is known as the "Supreme Council" which holds a convention annually. Membership is open to all. 1979 membership 11,500, a slight increase since 1972. There is a ritual with provisions for questions and answers, hymns pledges, and passwords. Besides insurance, it sponsors scholarships, and Masses for its members and assists members who are sick or affected by natural disasters.

=== Scandinavian ===
- Scandinavian American Fraternity - Founded in 1893. Membership was open to Christians of Scandinavian descent who were of good moral character. The by-laws prohibited discussing religious or political subjects. There was a ritualistic element to the fraternity, including a lodge altar and a burial service, that was criticized by Christian Cynosure as being "heathen", though prominent churchmen such as the Rev. P. R. Syrdal of the Norwegian Lutheran Church of America were active members who defended the organization. Grand Lodge headquarters at Eau Claire, Wisconsin. In 1923 it had 8,085 benefit members and 71 social members spread across Wisconsin, Minnesota, Illinois, and North Dakota.
- Scandinavian Fraternity of America - Founded in 1915 as the consolidation of three other groups including the Scandinavian Brotherhood of America, which had been founded in 1894. Membership began to decline in the 1980s, dropping from 37 lodges in 1983 to 28 in 1985. In 1991 it was reported to have only 2,500 members, a number repeated in 1995.

==== Danish ====
- Danish Brotherhood in America
- Danish Sisterhood - Founded December 15, 1883, in Negaunee, Michigan, by Mrs. Christine Hemmingsen. A supreme lodge was formed in 1887, and all the officers were women by 1910. Membership was open to women of Danish descent or married to a man of Danish descent. Admission is by black ball, with one blackball enough to disqualify; there is always a second ballot; if there is another blackball a selected secret committee is appointed to determine the cause. Had a secret ritual, and no uninitiated person may attend secret meetings of the lodge. Locals are called "lodges"; regional groups are called "Districts". National convention meets quadrennially. Supreme Lodge headquarters is in Chicago. Provides funeral benefits of up to $1,000, no more than two beneficiaries can be designated, and in special circumstances, other benefits can be applied for. Membership in 1922, 8,000, 1934, 7,000, and 1979, 4,500.

==== Norwegian ====
- Sons of Norway

==== Swedish ====
- Independent Order of Svithiod - Founded in 1881 for people of Swedish extraction. Headquartered in Chicago at 139 N. Clark Street. Rituals based on Norse gods such as Baldur, Thor, and Odin and required a secret oath from each initiate. The lodge session opens and closes with a prayer by the chaplain. Women allowed to become members in 1916. In 1923 the Order was active in Illinois, Indiana, Minnesota, Washington, and Missouri with 64 lodges, 13,036 benefit members, and 279 social members. Opened membership to non-Swedish Scandinavian Americans in 1962. Merged with Bankers Mutual Life Insurance of Freeport, Illinois, in 1978.
- Independent Order of Vikings
- Vasa Order of America

=== Scottish ===
- Daughters of Scotland - Incorporated in Ohio on October 3, 1899. Membership is open only to those of Scottish blood. Rituals had signs, oaths, and prayers. Grand Lodge dissolved in the early 1970s, though some local groups continued to meet afterwards.
- Order of Scottish Clans
- Sons of Scotland Benevolent Association - Founded 1876 in Toronto. Incorporated in Ontario in 1880, and on the federal level in 1937. Headquartered in Toronto, the association's lodges are called "Subordinate Camps", and the national structure is "Grand Camp", which meets in conventions triennially. Slogan "Lealty, Loyalty, Liberality". In the late 1970s, it still had an initiation ceremony and "affinity for fraternal ritualism", annual passwords, and regalia. In addition to insurance, it sponsors Scottish dancing and piping competitions, and parades in Scottish kilts. Membership is open to men and women of Scottish descent or their spouses. Five classes of membership - insured, central camp, juvenile, associate, and at large. Members are chosen by blackball. 1973 membership 12,887; 1979 membership 12,640 in 80 camps. 9,000 members in 1995. Charitable activities include Kidney Foundation of Canada and Alzheimer's disease organizations. Lost a third of its membership over the 1980s.

=== Western Slavs ===
==== Polish ====
- Alliance of Poles in America - Founded on September 22, 1895, in Ohio as Alliance of Poles. Added "of America" in 1914. Headquarters in Cleveland. Locals are called "Groups", regional groups "Circles", and the national structure is the "Central Body", which meets quadrennially. Membership is open to both sexes from the start. Now open to anyone 15–65, of good moral character, physically and mentally healthy, Polish or Lithuanian by birth or consanguinity. Has no ritual, but it does have an oath. Had 16,000 in the late 1960s, and 20,000 in 72 locals in 1979. Had 20,000 members in 1994.
- Federal Life Insurance of America - Founded in 1911 as a pressure group with the US Catholic church for Polish interests. Its original name was the Federation of Polish Catholic Laymen. The insurance aspect was added in 1913, and the name changed to the Federation of Poles in America. Became Federal Life Insurance of America in 1924. Local groups are called "Lodges"; in 1979 there were 28 lodges in 7 states. The national convention meets quadrennially. Poles or people of Polish descent are eligible. A women's division was added in 1940. There were 5,000 members in 1960, and 5,543 in 1979. There were 4,476 in 1994. Sent food and clothing to Poland and Polish refugees during World War II; aided the Ochronka Orphanage in Poland since the war; also supports International Folk Fair in Milwaukee.
- Polish Beneficial Association - Founded in 1899 in Philadelphia and headquartered there. Locals are called "groups". National convention meets quadrennially. Open to people of good moral character of Polish, Lithuanian, or Slavic descent and of the Roman Catholic, Byzantine Catholic or Greek Catholic Church or those married to one of the acceptable ethics and a member of the approved churches. Honorary membership is given to those who rendered a great service to the Association, Catholicism, the United States, or mankind in general. The minimum age is 15, though juvenile insurance/membership was available. In 1967 it had 24,500 members in 1979 16,000 in 105 groups. No ritual, but there is an oath. Offers scholarships, organizes folk dances, polka and Halloween parties, etc. Involved with the Catholic church. Patron saint is St. John Cantius, holds Masses and organized a pilgrimage to the National Shrine of Our Lady of Czestochowa in Doylestown, Pennsylvania.
- Polish Falcons of America
- Polish National Alliance of Brooklyn - Founded in 1903. Despite the name, it had members and was licensed to sell insurance in Connecticut, Michigan, Minnesota, New Jersey, and New York. Absorbed Polish American Workmen Aid Fund in 1960. Had 21,413 in 1965, approximately 12,000 in 1979 and 11,135 in 1995. Had 155 lodges in 1972, 87 in 1978. Offers Masses to its members, yearly grants to the Catholic Foundation and theological seminaries.
- Polish National Alliance
- Polish National Union (Sponjnia - Founded in February 1908 in the parish hall of St. Stanislaus Cathedral, in Scranton, Pennsylvania. Received charter by the end of the year. Women's lodges were authorized in 1909. Had difficulty retaining membership because it was actuarially unsound. Adopted the American Experience table at its sixth convention in Buffalo, New York, in September 1920, but it wasn't until 1923 that it was actuarially sound. Headquarters in Scranton. Local groups are called "branches", and regional groups are called "Districts". National convention meets quadrennially. 20,000 members in 1930, 32,142 in 247 branches in the mid-1960s, and 31,649 in 210 branches in 1979. 30,000 members in 1994. No ritual or secrecy, but there is a pledge. Open to both sexes 16 and up. The 1979 constitution didn't say anything about Polish ancestry. Purchased Sponjnia Farm in 1929 in Waymart, Pennsylvania, and developed it into a home for aged and sick members. Began Warsaw Village in Thornhurst Township, Pennsylvania, in 1948 as summer vacation area. Helped fund Church of Our Lady of Perpetual Help near Zarki, Poland. Their first constitution declared "Religious, political and social convictions may not hinder admission", but has nevertheless been tied to the Polish National Catholic Church.
- Polish Roman Catholic Union of America
- Polish Union of America - Founded in 1890. 10,000 members in 1979. 9,000 in 1994. Active in anti-defamation campaigns, provides scholarships, contributes to churches, charities, and educational foundations; also sponsors radio broadcast. Maintains library, museum, speakers bureau, ethnic awareness programs, and vocational placement services. Also runs White Eagle Young Adults Club.
- Polish Women's Alliance of America
- Sons of Poland
- Union of Polish Women of America - Founded on October 17, 1920, in Philadelphia by women who had previously been active in the Red Cross, White Cross, Emergency Aid and Polish War Mothers. Local units are called "Branches", regional structures are called "Districts", and there are also youth "Juvenile Circles". National convention meets quadrennially, at which point a "convention Queen" is crowned to reign for four years. "Supreme Executive Body" runs the organization between conventions. In 1979 membership was open to people of Polish origin or their spouses. 1979 membership. The motto is "Unity, Stability, and Prosperity". Strong connections with the Catholic Church. Grants "partial scholarships" and educational loans to Americans of Polish descent.

==== Czech ====
- Catholic Womens Fraternal of Texas - Founded on September 16, 1894, by Czech Catholic women in the Yoakum and Hallettsville area of Texas. Incorporated in 1927. Headquartered in Austin. Had 24,000 in 1972 and 25,000 in 1977. Membership is now open to people of both genders, irrespective of religion or ethnic background. Junior membership is available for those 17 and under. Has sponsored Newman Clubs at UT and A&M as well as a clerical endowment fund for priest education, the Czech Christian Academy in Rhome, Texas, Right to Life, Radio Free Europe/Radio Liberty as well as other charitable, community and Catholic projects.
- CSA Fraternal Life - Founded on March 4, 1854, as the Czecho-Slovak Protective Society. On January 1, 1933, merged with the Society of Taborites, Bohemian-Slavonic Fraternal Benefit Union, the Bohemian-Slavonic Union and the Bohemian American Foresters. The organization changed its name to the Czechoslovak Society of America but maintained the original 1854 charter. The Unity of Czech Ladies and Men was absorbed in 1977. According to its current constitution, membership is open to "Any person of good character and who subscribes to the purpose for which the Society is organized and meets all requirements for membership established by the Society." Had 52,000 members in the late 1960s, 50,000 in 1979 and 30,000 in 1990. Its motto was "Equality - Harmony - Fraternity". Its non-secret elaborate rituals included an altar, passwords, and knocks. Charitable activities include aid for the Bohemian Home for the Aged; school for retarded children, Chicago Lung Association, American Red Cross, Heart Research Foundation, Cancer Research Foundation, Muscular Dystrophy Association, firemen's and police benevolent associations, and other humanitarian projects.
- Czech Catholic Union - Founded in 1879 as the Czech Roman Catholic Central Union of Women by the merger of two altar and rosary societies at the St. Wenceslaus Church in Cleveland - St. Ann Society #1, founded in 1867 and St. Ludnila Society #2 founded in 1871. The union was arranged by Rev. Anthony Hynek and Emil Prucha. Adopted current name in 1938. Headquartered in Cleveland. 6,600 members in 1967. 9,800 in 1979, 10,000 in the mid 1980s and 5,000 in 1995. Sponsors seminary scholarship for St. Procopius Abbey, supports Czech Benedictines, youth programs, etc. Bought a bomber during WWII and the Cleveland local a Red Cross ambulance.
- Slavonic Benevolent Order of the State of Texas (also known as SPJST, its initials in Czech) - Founded December 28, 1896, in La Grange, Texas. Headquarters in Temple, Texas. Local groups called lodges, of which there were 130 in the late 1970s. There are currently "almost 100 lodges". These are divided into 7 districts covering Texas. The "Supreme Lodge" meets quadrennially. Membership open to both sexes if of good health and US citizens. Had 35,000 in 1969, 54,000 in 1979, and 60,000 in 1995. Initiation is done once each year, every lodge choosing its date, five votes necessary to reject a candidate for initiation. Supports two homes for the elderly in Taylor and Needville, Texas. During WWII funded a B-24 Liberator.
- Western Fraternal Life Association

==== Slovak ====
- First Catholic Slovak Ladies Association - Founded January 1, 1892, at St. Ladislaus Church in Cleveland as the First Catholic Slovak Ladies Union. Adopted the current name in the late 1960s. Absorbed some smaller fraternals over the years, including the Cleveland Slovak Union in 1945, the Slovak Catholic Cadets Union, the Catholic Slovak Benefit Organization of Cleveland, and the Catholic Slovak Brotherhood from Braddock, Pennsylvania. In 1969 it absorbed the Catholic Slovak Union, which had 1,500 members. Had 102,000 members in 1965, 95,000 in 1979 and 87,000 in 1994 Headquarters in Beachwood, Ohio. Locals called "Branches", present in 12 states and two Canadian provinces. National convention meets quadrennially. Gives aid to convents, monasteries, a theological seminary in Rome, and a "priest scholarship" underwritten by the Cleveland diocese. Awards $10,000 in nursing and college scholarships annually; maintains home for the aged in Beachwood. Organizes biannual youth conferences for people 16-20 which emphasizes the fraternal benefit system. Those who have been with the group for 25 years receive a pin, and 50 years a cash reward.
- First Catholic Slovak Union of the United States of America and Canada - Slovak name Prva Katolicka Slovenska Jednota Originally organized as the St. Joseph Society for Slovak Catholics in Cleveland, May 5, 1889. On April 9, 1890, they voted to form a union of all Slovak Catholic societies in the US. A union convention took place in Cleveland on September 4, 1890, and united seven Slovak Catholic societies. Original membership requirements: faithful Catholic who lives his faith, sends children to Catholic school, supports the parish and parochial school, never ridicules the church's ceremonies, and never writes anything against the Church or the clergy. 1979 membership requirements: male or female of Slovak birth or descent, or married to same; sound in body and mind, of exemplary habits, good moral character, practical Catholic of the Latin or Byzantine Rite, resident in the US or Canada, approved by a recognized Catholic priest and obeys the law of the church and his country. Those in "unlawful wedlock" were ineligible. Had 105,000 members in 1969. 105,000 members in the early 1980s, 80,000 in 1993. Lodges called "Branches", each attached to a "Slovak Catholic" parish. There were 600 branches in the US and Canada in 1979. Regional structures are called districts. The national assembly is called the "Supreme Convention" which meets triennially. The board of directors administers the Union between conventions. Headquarters in Cleveland. Sponsors scholarships, summer camps, bowling, golfing, etc. Also sends relief for natural disaster relief.
- Ladies Pennsylvania Slovak Catholic Union - Founded in 1898, chartered in 1900 in the Commonwealth of Pennsylvania. Originally known as the Women's Pennsylvania Slovak Roman and Greek Catholic Union. Headquartered in Wilkes-Barre, Pennsylvania. It had 16,000 members in 1965 and 1978. 14,600 in 1994 Licensed to sell insurance in eight states outside of Pennsylvania; supports Slovak Seminary in Rome, and the Slovak Catholic Federation.
- National Slovak Society of the United States of America - Rovnianek was expelled from theological school in Budapest for promoting Pan-Slavism. He came to the United States in the 1880s and enrolled in an American seminary, but left after a year to become a newspaper editor. His group was opposed by pro-Hungarian Slovaks, particularly clergy who had been trained in Hungarian seminaries. Some priests even refused absolution for members of the group. It encountered opposition from clergy from other denominations as well. Headquarters in Pittsburgh. Locals are called "subordinate assemblies", regional groups are district assemblies, and the national structure is the "Supreme Assembly", which meets every four years. Late 1960s membership 35,000, 1979 membership 21,000, 18,000 in 1994. Has a ritual. Slogan: "One for all and all for one". Membership is open to Christians of Slovak or Slavic birth or ancestors and their non-Slav friends of sound health and good moral character. Sponsors scholarships, spelling bees, Christmas parties, softball, baseball and dart ball games, dinners, dances, bazaars. Maintains Slovak Hall of Fame, advocated a free Slovakia during the Cold War.
- Presbyterian Beneficial Union - Founded 1901 in Pennsylvania by Slovak Calvinist Presbyterians. Affiliated with the church. Published some pamphlets and a hymnal in Slovak. Membership is open to Protestants of good health and good moral character 16–60; juvenile department for those under 16. 1,350 members in 1979. Locals are called "Subordinate Assemblies"; the national "Supreme Assembly" meets quadrennially, board of directors runs things in between those. Headquarters in Philadelphia.
- Slovak Catholic Sokol - Founded in 1905 as the Roman and Greek Catholic Union; a gymnastic society much like Sokol USA, but with a stronger religious, Catholic emphasis, including financial assistance to missionaries and people preparing for the priesthood. Sponsors annual track and field event. In 1921 had 19,025 members, more than 42,000 in 1936, 44,243 in 1946, and 50,000 in 1979. 50,000 members in 1995. Headquarters in Passaic, New Jersey. Slogan: "Sound mind in a sound body in a sound society". Motto: Za boha a narod, "For God and Nation". Patron saint Martin of Tours. Had 25% million in assets in 1921; attended 26th International Eucharistic Congress; gives out 20 scholarships of $500 per year.
- Sokol U.S.A. - A Sokol movement, apparently popular among people of Czech and Slovak descent in the mid-19th century. The earliest antecedent of this particular organization was a lodge founded in 1896, full name Slovak Gymnastic Union Sokol of the United States of America. Sponsors gymnastic events called Slets, insurance benefits, dances and calisthenics, scholarships, and "camps and halls" in several states. 23,000 members in 1979, and 12,000 in 1995. Absorbed the Slovak Evangelical Society and the Tatran Slovak Union in 1944.
- United Lutheran Society - Traces its origins to the Slovak Evangelical Union founded in 1893 in Freeland, Pennsylvania. In 1906 the Evangelical Slovak Women's Union was founded. These merged in 1962 creating the ULS. In 1979 the society had 11,000 members in 11 states and Canada. Headquarters in Ligonier, Pennsylvania.
- Zivena Beneficial Society - Founded in 1891. Headquartered in Ligonier, Pennsylvania, since at least the late 1970s, but in the early 1920s headquartered in Braddock, Pennsylvania. Had 5,611 at the end of 1918. 7,277 members in 1927, 4,357 in 1965, and 2,500 in 1977. The national convention met quadrennially. Licensed to sell insurance in Illinois, New York, Ohio, and Pennsylvania. Sponsored scholarships, gave aid to aged and handicapped members, and donated to civic and charitable groups. Merged into Croatian Fraternal Union in 1995.

==== Carpatho-Rusyn (Ruthenian) ====
- Greek Catholic Union of the USA
- United Societies of the USA - First founded in 1903 by three ecclesiastical lodges of the Greek Catholic Union in McKeesport and one from Glassport, Pennsylvania, as the United Societies of the Greek Catholic Religion of the United States. Original purpose not to form a fraternal group but to spread Greek Catholicism, foster Ruthenian nationalism, organize Greek Catholic schools and help sick or disabled members and the families of deceased members. Headquarters in McKeesport, Pennsylvania. Local groups are "subordinate lodges". National convention, which meets quadrennially, is the "Supreme Governing Body". Membership is open to any member of the Greek or Latin rite of the Catholic church. 4,900 in 190 lodges in 1968. 4,400 in 142 lodges in 1979. 3,875 members in 1995. No ritual, but there is an oath; saved some churches from going on sheriffs' auctions, "came to the defense of some falsely maligned" Greek Catholic clergy in the 1930s.

=== South Slavic ===
- Sloga Fraternal Life Insurance Society - Founded in 1897 as the South Slavic Benevolent Union. Adopted the name Sloga Fraternal Life Insurance Society in 1968. Headquarters in Milwaukee. In 1978 it was noted that "in recent years non-Slovanians [sic] also are eligible for membership" as well as non-Catholics. 1978 membership was 1,400 in 14 lodges. 1995 membership 2,247. In the late 1970s it was reported to sell insurance only in Wisconsin. By the late 1990s, they were reported to sell insurance "principally" in Wisconsin. It awards scholarships to members, conducts blood drives, and participates and bowling and softball. Members are encouraged to contribute to community charities such as United Fund and Easter Seals. Merged with Croatian Fraternal Union in 1994.
- Western Slavonic Association

==== Slovene ====
- American Slovenian Catholic Union
- Slovene National Benefit Society

==== Croatian ====
- Croatian Catholic Union of the United States of America and Canada - Founded in 1921. Headquarters in Hobart, Indiana. Convention meets quadrennially. In 1978 membership was described as being open to Croats and their spouses who are Latin or Greek rite Catholics. In 1997 it was described as open to all Latin or Greek rite Catholics in the United States and Canada. In 1965 the union had 13,772. In 1978 the Union had 119 local units in 16 states and Canada with about 13,500 in 1978. In 1988 it was reported to have 13,000. The union assists the Catholic church, theology students, scholarships, and disaster relief. In addition, the union performs "works of mercy" extended to members who are ill or hospitalized, and arranges sporting events. Merged with the Croatian Fraternal Union in 2006.
- Croatian Fraternal Union

==== Serbian ====
- First Serbian Benevolent Society - The First Serbian Benevolent Society of San Francisco is the oldest Serbian organization in America. Founded in 1880, the FSBS was originally called the Serbian-Montenegrin Literary and Benevolent Society. It was organized to promote social and intellectual interchange, and establish a system of general philanthropy and benevolence for Serbian immigrant laborers toiling far from their homeland. The eight founding members were Antonije Vukasovich, Jovan Jovovich, Jovan Pavkovich, Krsto Gopcevich, Rade Begovich and Vladimir Jovovich, all from Boka Kotorska, George S. Martinovich from Montenegro, and Mikhail Rashkovich from Vojvodina. The Society, which has recently celebrated its 135th anniversary, is headquartered in Colma, CA where it maintains a Serbian Cultural Center and Museum along with a Serbian Cemetery and the Chapel of the Assumption of the Virgin Mary.
- Serb National Federation - Created after the merger of several Serbian American organizations in 1929. Headquarters in Pittsburgh. Membership open to people of Serb or Slav descent 16–60. Those under 16 can join "Junior Order". In 1979 it had 20,000 members, and "membership groups" existed in 10 states and Canada. In 1995 it had 15,200 members. Sponsors social gatherings, cultural events, sports programs, finances church buildings, and meeting halls.

==== Macedonian ====
- Macedonian Patriotic Organization

=== Eastern Slavs ===
==== Russian ====
- Russian Brotherhood Organization of the U.S.A. - Founded in 1900, incorporated 1903. Headquarters in Philadelphia. National convention meets quadrennially. 365 lodges in 1975, and 386 lodges in 1972. Mid-1960s membership 12,000; 9,000 members in 1978, 7,832 in 1995. Many lodges attached to orthodox churches. Mostly concentrated in New York, New Jersey, Connecticut, Pennsylvania, and Ohio. Grants scholarships and helps parochial schools; organize choral groups, balalaika orchestras, and folk dancing. Built cultural and sports centers.
- Russian Independent Mutual Aid Society - Founded in 1931. Operates mainly in Illinois and Michigan. 1,475 members in 1965, less than 900 in 1978, 789 in 1989, and 825 in 1995. Headquarters in Chicago. Lodges are called "branches", and biannual national conventions. Works closely with Russian Orthodox Church, supports the study of Russian language, music, folk dances, and customs; sponsors concerts, dramatic presentations, picnics, and banquets.
- Russian Orthodox Catholic Mutual Aid Society of the USA - Founded in 1895. Headquarters in Wilkes-Barre, Pennsylvania. Conventions every four years. In 1965 it had 2,777 members in 170 local lodges, in 1978 1,500 in 152 lodges. Had only 1,510 members in 1995. Closely associated with the church, and contributes to its theological seminaries, aids boy and girl scouts, and the Red Cross.
- Russian Orthodox Catholic Womens Mutual Aid Society - Founded in 1907. Headquarters in Pittsburgh. Had 50 lodges, all of them in Pennsylvania in 1979. 1965 membership 2,425, 1978 membership 1,700. 1995 membership 1,789. Grants scholarships and donations to St. Tikhon's Seminary and Monastery, St. Vladimir's Orthodox Theological Seminary; and the Monastery of the Transfiguration, Orthodox Press Fund, Alaskan Fund and the UPMC Children's Hospital of Pittsburgh.

==== Ukrainian ====
- Providence Association of Ukrainian Catholics in America - Founded in 1912. Headquartered in Philadelphia where the annual convention always meets. Membership is open to "any Ukrainian, either Ukrainian Catholic or of another Christian denomination, who is not hostile to the Ukrainian Catholic Church, is morally stable, mentally and physically sound, honest, practicing his/her Christian faith, of good character, and fully abiding by these Bylaws...[a] Ukrainian, or a person of Ukrainian descent, or of another ethnic affiliation related to a person of Ukrainian origin, in good health, not exceeding 70 years of age, is also eligible for membership." In 1979 had 210 lodges in Pennsylvania and New Jersey. Had the same number of lodges in 2015. Had 11,000 members at the beginning of the 1930s, 8,000 in 1942, 16,994 in 1965, 18,000 in 1979, 17,927 in 1994. Members are admonished to send their children to parochial schools following the law of the church. One of the group's original objectives was to create low-interest loans for religious institutions, particularly parochial schools.
- Ukrainian Fraternal Association - Founded in 1910 as the Ruthenian National Union, became the Ukrainian Workingmen's Association in 1918, and adopted the present name in 1978. It was open to Ukrainians, Russians and other Slavs without regard to religious or political affiliations; clergy and those who insisted on debating religious questions were encouraged to join another group. In 1966 membership was open to any person of Ukrainian descent 16-65 except those who were pregnant, alcoholics or drug addicts. Had 24,134 members in 1965, 20,000 members in 1995. Headquarters in Scranton, Pennsylvania, where the UFA was founded. National convention held quadrennially. Locals are either called lodges or "local assemblies", Schmidt uses the terms inter-changeably. Later apparently called branches. There was a ritualistic initiation; besides its insurance benefits, it has helped out in natural disaster and war relief; supported the Ivan Franko Scholarship Foundation. Merged with Providence Association of Ukrainian Catholics in America in 2009.
- Ukrainian National Aid Association - Founded in 1914, more political than the UNA. Headquartered in Pittsburgh. National convention held quadrennially. Locals called lodges, of which there were 170 in 1979. Primarily active in Pennsylvania, Ohio, Illinois, and Canada. 6,928 members in 1965, 8,000 in 1978, 8,710 members in 1995. Merged into the Providence Association of Ukrainian Catholics in America in 2001.
- Ukrainian National Association

== Religious ==
=== Ecumenical/Interdenominational ===
- International Order of the King's Daughters and Sons – founded in 1886, this fraternal order, which is open to Christians of any Christian denomination (e.g. Anglican, Baptist, Evangelical-Lutheran, Methodist, Moravian, Orthodox, Quaker, Reformed, Roman Catholic), engages in philanthropic work including "building churches; paying mortgages on those already built; educating the young men and women for the ministry and for the foreign mission field; taking care of orphans and widows, of the old and the sick; building hospitals and infirmaries; sending trained nurses to the homes of the poor; and following the sailors with evidences of loving care." Its insignia is a "silver cross as the outward symbol of their pledge of love and service and more than one thousand different lines of work upon which they have entered".
- Orange Institution - The Grand Orange Lodge of British America, more commonly known as the Grand Orange Lodge of Canada or simply Orange Order in Canada, is a Protestant fraternal organization established in Toronto in 1830. It is open to Christians who belong to Protestant Churches.

=== Anabaptist ===
- Mennonite Mutual Aid Association - Founded in July 1945 as Mennonite Mutual Aid. In its first ten years, it expended loans to Civilian Public Service workers following their service in World War II. In the following 15 years, different insurance programs were established, including automobile insurance, hospital and burial benefits, etc. Became a fraternal benefit society in January 1966 as the Mennonite Mutual Aid Association. Merged with other Mennonite financial union groups to become Everence in 2010. Originally open to Mennonites 16 and up, the association's denominational scope was enlarged to include other Anabaptist denominations in 1984. Today Everence, while remaining the stewardship agency of the Mennonite Church USA, offers its "products and services ... to everyone interested in practicing stewardship that aligns with our founding values." In 1979 locals were called "Branches" and were usually affiliated with congregations of the Mennonite General Conference. Each branch must meet at least 12 times a year. The highest authority was the "Biennial Conference". There were also district conferences. February 1979 membership 4,984 in 12 states. Sponsored seminars on church leadership, family life training, estate planning, financial counseling, youth leadership, and family communications. Programs include helping local families with emergency needs, aiding local church projects;

=== Baptist ===
- Baptist Life Association - Founded in 1884 as the German Baptist Life Association. Adopted current name in 1934. Had 1,158 members in 1911; at the time it readjusted its inadequate rate system. By 1921 this had grown to 2,639. In 1965 it had 12,335 members, in 1979 about 13,000 in 49 branches in 26 states. Had 12,705 members in 1994. Headquarters in Buffalo, New York. National convention meets quadrennially. Motto "Honoring God while serving Mankind". Offers scholarships ranging from $800 – $2,000. A "Branch match" program where the branch is given $100 for a parish project and the parish matches it. Home Bible studies prepared by Moody Bible Institute, summer family camping and Bible conferences, art and photo contests, etc.

=== Catholic ===
- American Order of United Catholics - Founded in January 1896 in New York City by Catholics who wished to counter the influence of the American Protective Association. It was "expected of the founders" that they would demand candidates for office who disapproved of the APA or other organizations that sought to discriminate against Catholics. A Supreme Council was organized on March 7, 1896, and the Order was organized "upon the usual secret society lines". They issued a circular that proclaimed that the Church did not oppose secret societies, except those that were oathbound.
- Catholic Aid Association - Founded in 1878 by German Catholics in Minnesota. The order began with 464 members from 10 parishes and was called the Deutsche Römisch-Katholische Unterstützungs-Gesellschaft von Minnesota; adopted its present name in 1923. Had 58,722 members in 1965, and approximately 78,000 in 1979. Headquarters in St. Paul, Minnesota. Local groups are called "subordinate Councils", of which there were 240 in 1979. Annual convention called the "Grand Council". Has rituals for initiation, installation of officers, and other purposes. Open to Roman Catholics 16-65 who are not a member of a secret society condemned by the Church. Sponsors matching grants program for Catholic elementary schools and religious education programs. Also, a College Tuition Scholarship Program has helped 800 CAA members receive degrees. Also sponsors banquets, family outings, dances, and youth activities; now Catholic United Financial.
- Catholic Benevolent Legion
- Catholic Daughters of the Americas
- Catholic Family Life Insurance - Founded August 1868 by John Martin Henni, the first Archbishop of Milwaukee, as the Family Protective Association. Incorporated in March 1869. Claims to be the oldest Catholic fraternal order, the first to adopt the legal reserve system, first to insure women and children, and first to provide Masses for living and deceased members. Changed name to Catholic Family Life Insurance in 1949. Had 37,000 members in 1967, 47,000 in 54 branches in 1979, 45,000 in 78 branches in 2010. Open to all members of the Catholic faith who were over 18. Headquarters in Milwaukee. Locals called Branches, of which there were 54 in 1979. The national convention is the "Supreme Governing Body", which meets every four years. Sponsors home and foreign missions; invests and makes loans to the building of churches and Catholic schools, hospitals (apparently not loans), a "respect for life" campaign against abortion; and also includes concern for aged and handicapped. Supports many charities such as the "Catholic Rural Life" movement for family farms, Cancer Fund, Heart Fund, Red Cross, and Community Chest. Also sponsors summer camps, social dances, athletic events, family campouts, picnics, and teen parties. Merged with Union Saint-Jean-Baptiste in 1991. Merged with Northern Fraternal Life in 1993. Merged with Catholic Knights on April 1, 2010, into Catholic Financial Life.
- Catholic Fraternal League - Originally incorporated in Massachusetts on June 19, 1889, as the International Fraternal Alliance. Reorganized in 1893-5 when the Massachusetts legislature was considering closing fraternal benefit orders. A trustee was appointed to wind up the affairs of the order, and the endowment rank was permanently closed. However, a new benefit scheme was created and the order reformed as the Union Fraternal League, another "International Fraternal Alliance" having been founded in another state. Became the Catholic Fraternal League in 1916. Arthur Preuss noted that this was the only time he had found that a secular order had become a religious one. In 1899 it had about 2,000 members in "Ontario and Quebec, in most of New England and Middle, Northwestern and Pacific states." Local groups called "subordinate assemblies"
- Catholic Knights of America
- Catholic Knights and Ladies of America
- Catholic Knights and Ladies of Illinois - Founded in 1884 in Carlyle, Illinois, as the Catholic Knights of Illinois. Always admitted men and women, ages 18–50. Had 2,000 members in 1899. Had 8,500 members in 1965, 13,000 in 1978. Headquarters in Belleville, Illinois. 45 units in Illinois, the only state in which it is licensed to sell insurance. "Supreme legislative body" meets quadrennially. Original purpose is to "offer cheap life insurance without the danger of going into associations or orders forbidden by our Holy Mother Church." Active in promoting Fraternal Week; a Mass is offered every month for the local members; contributes to Catholic Communication Foundation; "Teens Encounter Christ" retreat for high school youth.
- Catholic Knights of Ohio - Founded September 20, 1891, in Hamilton, Ohio, by 27 men who paid a $1 initiation fee. On March 20, 1892, the group had 1,018 members who had paid the $1 during a special six-month offer. Adapted the reserve fund early; in 1894 put the reserve fund into the hands of a 5-member commission. It had previously been run by local branches. Began offering juvenile insurance for those under 18. Admitted women to full membership in 1920, the first female branch set up at St. Vitus's Church, Cleveland. 18,000 members in 1979. Headquarters in Lakewood, Ohio. In 1979 had 50 local branches in Ohio and Kentucky, each attached to a Catholic parish. The supreme convention is a "State Council". Open only to Catholics over 16. Works two degrees, one the initiatory degree, the other a ritualistic secondary degree, designed to motivate further commitment. Motto "Morality, Manliness, and Manners". Supports Catholic schools system, education of Catholic priests, fifty-year golden rosaries and Catholic Communication Foundation; scholarships for Catholic schools, etc. Local branches, aid and visit the disabled, sick, and bereaved; also sponsors bowling and baseball.
- Catholic Knights of St. George - Founded by German refugees from the Kulturkampf in Pittsburgh in 1881. They had received permission to form a fraternal society from the Bishop of Pittsburgh in 1880. The original name was German Roman Catholic Knights of St. George. Ladies Auxiliary was founded in 1939. In 1967 had a membership of 16,000 in eight states. In 1979 had 70,000 in 13 states, Illinois being the farthest west. Headquarters in Pittsburgh. Locals are called branches and are affiliated with a Catholic parish. 300 branches in 13 states in 1979. Regional groups are called districts, highest authority is called the "Supreme Assembly", which meets biennially. Opened Knights of St. George Home for the aged and infirm in 1923. Opened Camp Rolling Hills for boys and girls in 1969. The camp was open to non-Catholics. Both establishments are located in Wellsburg, West Virginia. Had an altar boy recognition program that was extended to altar girls in 1978. Scholarships for high school students who have been members of the group for two years are offered. It collects medical supplies from local physicians to ship to missionaries. Has also supported American Federation of Catholic Societies, National Catholic Welfare Council and Catholic Central Verein of America. Adopted graded assessment plan in 1904, adopted an actuarially sound method in 1915.
- Catholic Workman - Founded in 1891 in St. Paul, Minnesota, by Fr. John Rynda for Czech Catholics. In 1965 there were 19,000 members, 18,000 in 1979. Had 15,000 members. Headquarters in St. Paul, Minnesota. National convention meets quadrennially. In 1978 there were 124 locals and 12 state groups. Absorbed the Western Bohemian Catholic Union in 1930 and the Daughters of Columbus in 1937. Sponsors Boy and Girl Scout troops, Red Cross, various parish functions, church retreats, visits the sick and assists the needy, sponsors masses; and supports students studying theology and Catholic educational activities. Merged into the First Catholic Slovak Ladies Association in 2004.
- Knights of Columbus
- Knights of Peter Claver - Founded in 1909 by members of Most Pure Heart of Mary Catholic Church in Mobile, Alabama, as a Black Catholic fraternal order, as Blacks were barred from the Knights of Columbus due to their race. Among the founders were The Rev. John H. Dorsey (the second Black Catholic priest ordained in the US), many White priests, and three Black parishioners.
- Knights of St. John - Founded in 1879. Membership is open to "practical Catholic gentlemen" ages 16–55. Social membership available was also available, even to those over 55. In 1978 there were 7,144 members. The international structure is called the "Supreme Commandery", regional structures "Grand Commanderies", and local units are called "Commanderies". There were 172 Commanderies in 1978 including 27 in "West Africa", 5 in Togo, and 8 in Trinidad and Tobago. The order has a secret ritual but dropped password in April 1977 because it was time-consuming and had "no appreciable organizational value". The group appears in uniforms for Catholic ceremonies such as first communions Masses, and confirmations. The order has a sports program that sponsors golf and bowling. There is also a death benefit.
- Knights of Saint John, Supreme Ladies Auxiliary - Female auxiliary of above; open to "practical Catholic ladies" ages 16–55. Social membership available was also available, even to those over 55. Those under 8-16 can join the junior auxiliary. In April 1978 there were 14,251 members. The highest authority is the "Supreme Convention" which meets biennially. State structures are "Grand Auxiliaries", which meet annually, and locals "Subordinate Auxiliaries". There were 161 of these in the US in 1978, as well as 28 in foreign countries. Headquarters were in Rochester, New York. The group has a secret ritual, a uniformed drill team, and death benefits. Supports mission work, Red Cross, American Cancer Society, American Heart Association, Muscular Dystrophy Association, National Foundation for Infantile Paralysis.
- Loyal Christian Benefit Association - Founded on April 6, 1890, as Ladies' Catholic Benevolent Association, originally for Catholic women. In 1927 any offspring from birth to 16 were eligible for fraternal insurance. In 1960 admitted Catholic husbands, brothers, and nephews. By 1979 open to Christians of good moral character and in good health. In 1967, it had 85,000 members and 51,369 in December 1978, 46,000 members in 1994. Headquarters in Titusville, Pennsylvania. Locals are Branches, national structure is called the "National Council". Some rituals involved in the initiation, and "Marshalls also are utilized on the national and local organizational levels." Has given millions to Catholic churches, hospitals, orphan asylums, schools, colleges, foreign missions, religious orders, and the aged. Began a national project of providing for the deaf in 1945. In 1978 "studied legislation affecting the family's well-being". Gave funds to the Catholic Communications Foundation, and monitored TV for family programming. Had an orphans program for children of deceased members. On the local level, it visits the sick, comforts the bereaved, aids seniors, and assists the blind and exceptional children.
- Western Catholic Union - Founded October 16, 1877. Juveniles were admitted in 1881 and women in 1912. Enrolled 1,000 in 1978, its best recruiting year ever. Had 27,730 members in 1995. Headquarters in Quincy, Illinois. The headquarters building was constructed in 1925, the largest in Quincy through the 1970s. Locals are called branches, there are also divisions, and the national level is called the Supreme Council. In 1976, it purchased a Catholic high school and a Presbyterian church, other buildings were built contiguous to these properties. The entire city block was supposedly taken up with the structure. Originally just provided aid to widows and orphans of its members on the assessment plan, now on an actuarially sound system. Distributes food to needy families at Christmas, and sponsors the "Keep Christ in Christmas" campaign. Gives aid to "Catholic Communications" which produces TV and radio programs explaining the Catholic faith to Catholics and non-Catholics alike; annual pilgrimages to shrines; prayer card distributions; conducts picnics, bus trips, socials, etc.

=== Evangelical-Lutheran ===
- Aid Association for Lutherans
- Concordia Mutual Life Association - Founded in 1908 to sell life insurance to Lutherans. Licensed to sell insurance in 11 states; 1979 membership 25,000. Headquarters in Chicago.
- Lutheran Brotherhood

== Other ==
- National Fraternal Society for the Deaf

== See also ==
- List of North American fraternal orders
- List of friendly and benefit societies
- List of temperance organizations
