= Hibernian Rifles =

Irish nationalist militia

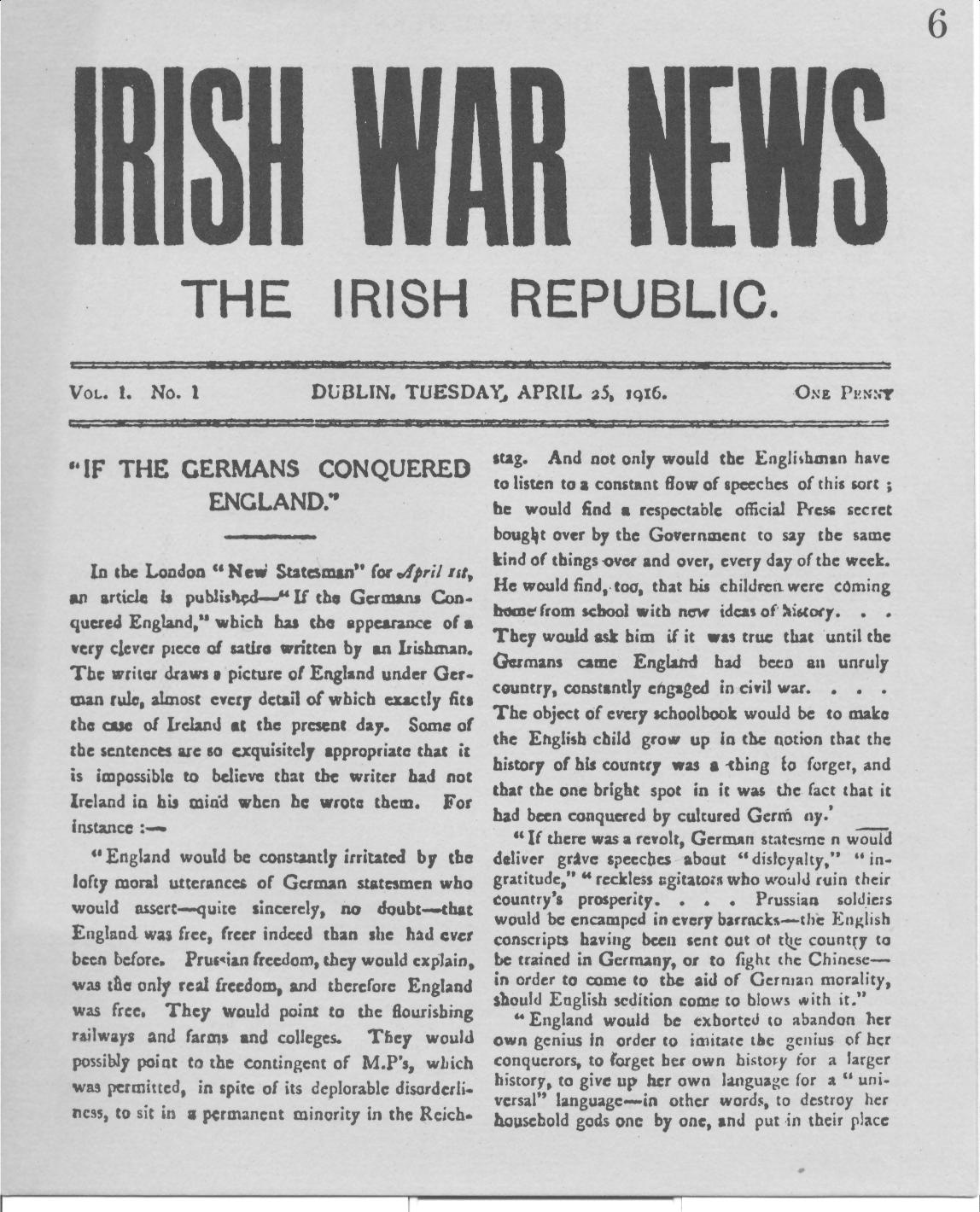
Irish War News 1916

The Hibernian Rifles was a marginal Irish nationalist militia that organised in Ireland in the early years of the 20th Century, having its Dublin Headquarters at 28, North Frederick Street. Its membership was initially Roman Catholic but later opened up membership to any faith.

The Hibernian Rifles were active in Dublin during the Easter Rising of 1916. In an article in the Irish War News, Patrick Pearse thanked the Hibernian Rifles for its contribution.

== Origins ==
The Hibernian Rifles were the product of a split in the Ancient Order of Hibernians (AOH). It was the military arm of the Ancient Order of Hibernians (Irish-American Alliance), which had broken away from Ancient Order of Hibernians (Board of Erin) in about 1907. As the name suggests, most of the former were in the USA, where they were under the influence of Clan-na-Gael. The AOH (Irish-American Alliance) claimed to be opposed to "the narrow sectarianism" of the AOH (Board of Erin). In a characteristic lecture, "Treason in Ireland", in December 1914, the Rifles commandant John J. Scollan said: "Many more of us through God’s grace shall live to see the Union Jack of England down in the dust and our own immortal green interwoven with the yellow and white of the Irish Republic waving proudly and victoriously…over the land."

== Activities in Ireland ==
During the 1913 Dublin Lockout, a special subscription was placed on the Rifles members in Ireland and a fund was also opened in the USA for the relief of distress of those affected by the strike. The Hibernian Rifles developed friendly relations with the Irish Citizen Army after it was founded by James Connolly, and some members of the former joined the latter, a fact which was advertised regularly in The Irish Worker. By 1915 the Hibernian Rifles were being formed into an organized armed unit.

While it was willing to co-operate with other nationalist groups, the Irish Republican Brotherhood (IRB) does not seem to have trusted it completely and therefore it had to obtain some of their rifles from James Connolly, and others which they bought from British soldiers.

The Irish Volunteers declined to affiliate the Rifles as a unit (it also declined the Irish Citizen Army the same status) but friendly co-operation became possible, mainly through Thomas MacDonagh. It was through him, perhaps, that they participated as a unit at the funeral of Jeremiah O'Donovan Rossa and that they allowed their headquarters, at 28 North Frederick Street, to be used by the Volunteers.

In 1915 it launched a weekly newspaper The Hibernian. The constitutional nationalists of the time, led by John Redmond, scornfully called the advanced nationalist papers "the mosquito press". The Hibernian serialised "Ireland's Roll of Honour", which was a list of those killed or wounded at Harrel's 'Battle of Clontarf' and Bachelor's Walk in 1914, or who were imprisoned, deported or served with exclusion orders under the Defence of the Realm Act. According to Pat McGlynn, "It was one of the most aggressive pieces of journalism of the period and one that deserves more attention than it has received".

== Easter Rising ==
Co-operation between the Rifles with the Volunteers increased, as the Rising began to draw near, but no definite date for the insurrection was given to it by the leaders of the IRB. On Easter Sunday, 1916, it paraded as usual at its headquarters. When news of Eoin MacNeill's countermanding order cancelling the planned Volunteers manoeuvres, which were to be the signal for the Rising, appeared in the Sunday Independent, the commandant, realising that something serious was planned, ordered the Rifles to parade the next day.

The Easter Rising began at 12 noon on Easter Monday. The men of the Hibernian Rifles were given a choice whether or not to take part, and 20 to 30 chose to participate and went to the General Post Office at midnight. On the Tuesday some of them, along with men from Maynooth, were sent to the Exchange Hotel in Parliament Street, where, in a rapid exchange of fire, one of their rank Edward Walsh was fatally wounded, before retiring back to the GPO where they remained for the rest of the week.

Pat McGlynn, in his conclusion to his chapter on the Hibernian Rifles, says of them that although "small in number, the Hibernian Rifles should not be forgotten in any celebration of the Rising that was not of their planning, but in which they willingly joined when once it had begun".
