= Canadian Order of Chosen Friends =

Canadian fraternal benefit order

Canadian Order of Chosen Friends (COCF; later, Reliable Life Insurance Society, Old Reliable Life Insurance Society, and Reliable Life Insurance Company) was a fraternal benefit order that existed in Canada in the late nineteenth and early twentieth centuries. Organized in 1887, it was an offshoot of the Indianapolis-based Order of Chosen Friends.

== Organization ==
The COCF belonged to the Canadian Fraternal Association, which among its qualifications for membership has the following: "No fraternal or benefit society, order or association shall be entitled to representation in this Association, unless said society, order or association works under a ritual". The COCF was organized in 1887 with the head office was at Hamilton, Ontario. The leading spirit of the Canadian organization was "Grand Recorder" William F. Montague. "Aid and Protection" was the order's motto.

== History ==
The COCF was incorporated on June 1, 1887, by Canadian members of the latter organization, who believed that certain difficulties with the laws in the province of Ontario could best be obviated by establishing a special jurisdiction of the Order for Canada. The COCF started with about 150 members, most of whom had become dissatisfied with their membership in the Order of Chosen Friends of Indianapolis. The Canadian members of this latter society sought by court action to enjoin the new society from using so similar a name in Ontario. The Canadian Order won the suit and obtained judgment for costs, amounting to $400. The amount of this judgment was never collected, although an effort to do so was made repeatedly.

The COCF had a sick benefit department since 1890.

About 1892, the U.S. order endeavored to incorporate a Provisional Grand Lodge of the Order of Chosen Friends in Ontario. The Canadian Order went into court and blocked the effort. There was considerable litigation between the Canadian order and the U.S. order in Ontario, but the former invariably triumphed and finally drove the latter out of the Province.

The beneficial membership in 1904 was 27,500.

The COCF was forced to readjust its rates in 1915, which led to "insurgency" and a decrease in membership of about 12,500.

In 1917, it established a child insurance department under the Ontario Insurance Act of 1916.

At the 1923 biennial meeting of the Grand Council of the COCF, Actuary Sydney H. Pipe submitted a plan of readjustment which would place the old members on an equitable basis. The Grand Council rejected the plan and according to the laws of the province of Ontario, the insurance department of the Province would act in due course of time, making a readjustment by arbitrary ruling. The proposal was to change the basis of the members admitted prior to July 1915; those received since were contributing at rates estimated to be actuarially sound. A number of changes made in the same meeting would affect the operations of the Society. A majority vote would be all that was required to pass legislation in the Grand Council, instead of two-thirds. A new table of rates for the ordinary class from 16 years to 44 was adopted on the suggestion of Pipe, also a similar table for hazardous classes. In order to provide a future old-age benefit for the members an endowment at age 65, certificate in both the ordinary and hazardous classes was approved. All payments for disability in the future, either by reason of illness or old-age, were cancelled, and if the members desired that feature they would have to pay additional rates computed by the actuary. The older members possessing what were known as vested rights, meaning those who had reached the age of disability and were receiving benefits, would continue to receive them until the fund was exhausted.

By 1924, the COCF had 520 lodges and 32,515 members.

In July 1943, the Order became the "Reliable Life Insurance Society".

In 1964, a group of investors bought the "Old Reliable Life Insurance Society", which they established as the "Reliable Life Insurance Company". It was turned into a stock-owned life insurance company that year.

== Plan ==
The COCF's benefit plan included:

- Qualifications for admission: Sex, either; age, 18–51.
- Benefits promised, US$250, US$500, US$1,000, US$1,500, or US$2,000, payable at death. For age disability after 75, one-fifth of certificate annually for five years. For permanent total disability, one-tenth of certificate annually for five years, remainder at death.
- Death benefit limited by proceeds of one assessment.
- Rates graded to entry age, level thereafter.
- Assessments levied monthly; extra as needed.
- Deductions made from certificate face for benefits already paid.
- Reserve accumulated by surplus from assessments.
- Expense provided for by per capita of US$1.
- Old members pay old rates.
- Weekly sick and accident benefits at special rates.
- Members engaged in hazardous occupations pay special rates.
