= List of Alzheimer's disease organizations =

This is a list of different Alzheimer's disease organizations in different countries around the world.

== International ==
- Alzheimer's Disease International
- Alzheimer Research Forum

== Europe ==
=== United Kingdom ===
- Alzheimer's Research UK
- Alzheimer's Society
- Dementia Research Centre, UCL Institut of Neurology

== North America ==
=== Canada ===
- Alzheimer Society of Canada
- Alzheimer Society of Ontario

=== United States ===
- Alzheimer's Association - research, education, advocacy, support
- Alzheimer's Drug Discovery Foundation - early-stage drug research and clinical trials
- BrightFocus Foundation
- Curing Alzheimer's Disease Foundation - sponsoring research into the Infectious Hypothesis of AD
- Cure Alzheimer's Fund - utilizing a venture philanthropy approach
- National Institute on Aging
- Fisher Center for Alzheimer's Research Foundation
- Memory Bridge
