= Order of Chosen Friends =

19th-20th century North American fraternal organization

The Order of Chosen Friends was a fraternal benefit order that existed in North America in the late nineteenth and early twentieth centuries. The group suffered a number of splits during its lifetime, leading scholar Alan Axelrod to call it "almost a parody" of fraternal benefit societies of the time.

== United States ==
The Order was founded by a group of individuals who wished to found an organization that would pay old age and disability benefits. This group, a number of whom were Freemasons and Oddfellows launched the OCF in Indianapolis, Indiana on May 28, 1879. Like most fraternal societies of the day, the original Order had a secret ritual and was organized in the typical three tiered structure of local "Councils", statewide "Grand Councils" and a national "Supreme Council". Before the schisms occurred it had 12,000 members.

In 1881 the Order of United Friends split from the OCF in New York State over disagreements in insurance practices. The United Friends of Michigan left in 1889 and the Canadian Order of Chosen Friends was formed in Ontario in 1891. Lastly, German-speaking members left to form the United League of America in 1895. In spite of all this, the group was able to rebound and had 32,255 members in 1899. However, adverse publicity about the organizations financial difficulties finally spelled the end of the Order in the early twentieth century.

=== Order of United Friends ===
Incorporated in the state of New York in 1881, the O.U.F. was open to men and women and paid death and disability benefits. The ritual was based on the Golden Rule and the order's motto was "Unity, Friendship and Security". It had approximately 20,000 members in the late 1890s.

=== Independent Order of Chosen Friends ===
The Independent Order of Chosen Friends was founded in early 1882 when leaders of the O.C.F. in California petitioned the Supreme Council for the creation of a Pacific Jurisdiction. When this was refused there was a secession and the Independent Order of Chosen Friends was created. The group did well for a while with 7,000-8,000 members but disappeared by the late 1890s.

=== United Friends of Michigan ===
The United Friends of Michigan were founded in Detroit in 1889 by Dr. G. F. Kirker of Detroit and E. F. Lamb of Mount Morris, Michigan. Membership was open to people ages 18–51. The UFM had 10,000 members in the late 1890s. The orders emblem was a cornucopia with a red, white and blue shield bearing the letters U. F. & P standing for Unity, Fraternity and Protection. The Friends paid death, disability and old age benefits. It apparently became defunct by 1923.

=== United League of America ===
Founded by German members in Chicago in 1895. The leaders of the schism were dissatisfied with the Orders plan of equalization. It was unclear if the U.L.A. survived into the late 1890s.

== Canada ==
The Canadian Order of Chosen Friends were originally incorporated in the Province of Ontario in 1887. The Canadian affiliates left the OCF when many members became dissatisfied with the parent order. For several years there was considerable litigation between the two over the use of the name "Chosen Friends" and because of financial matters. The Order established a sickness department in 1890 and a child insurance department in 1917. It made "very necessary actuarial adjustments" in 1915, which, nevertheless, resulted in a significant decrease in membership. However, by the early 1920s the Order had rebounded again and had 32,000 members. In 1943 the Order became the Reliable Life Insurance Society. It was turned into a stock own life insurance company in 1964. Its headquarters were in Hamilton, Ontario.

== See also ==
- List of North American fraternal benefit orders
