= Irish War News =

Irish Easter Rising publication

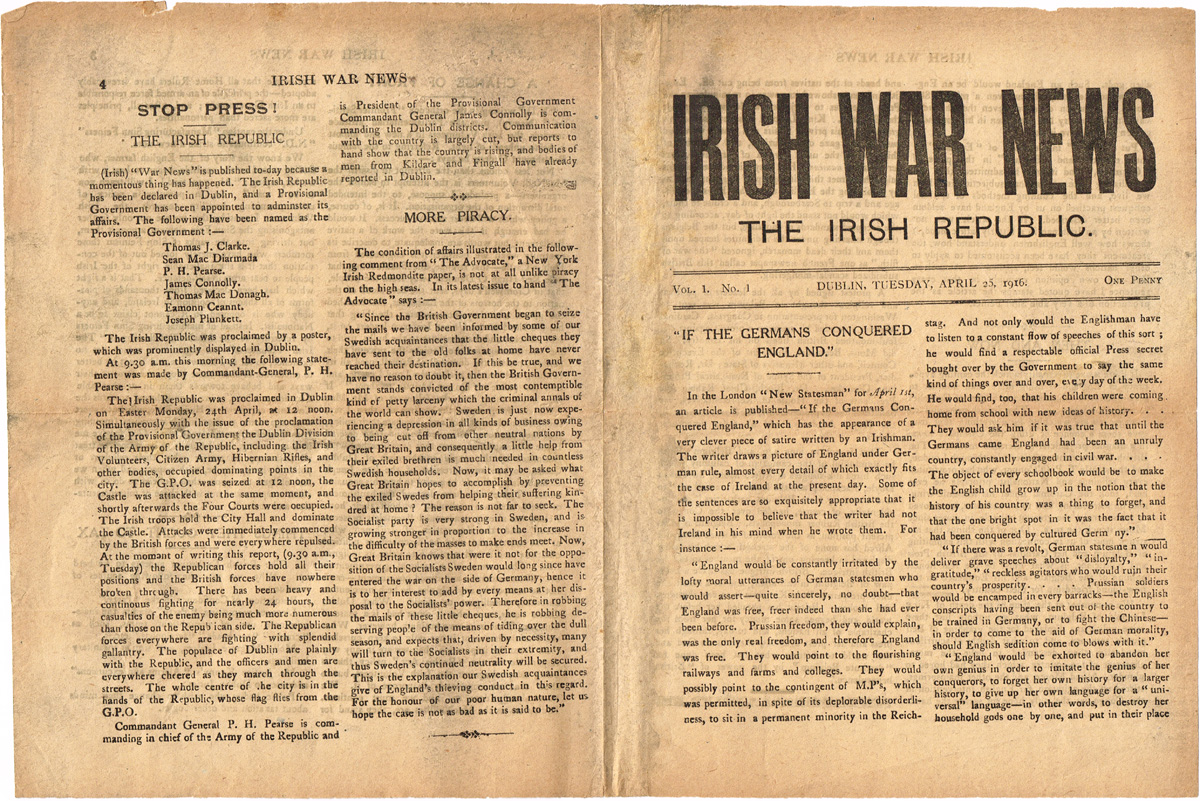
- Publisher: Gaelic Press
- City: Dublin
- Country: Ireland

Irish War News was a republican publication in Dublin during the Easter Rising. The first issue of Irish War News was published by the Gaelic Press on 25 April 1916, the second day of the rising. It reported on the first 24 hours of the rising. Eight years later, the second and final issue was published by the Gaelic Press to commemorate the rising's 8th anniversary. Aside from the Proclamation of the Irish Republic, it was the only printed document produced by leaders of the rising.

== History ==
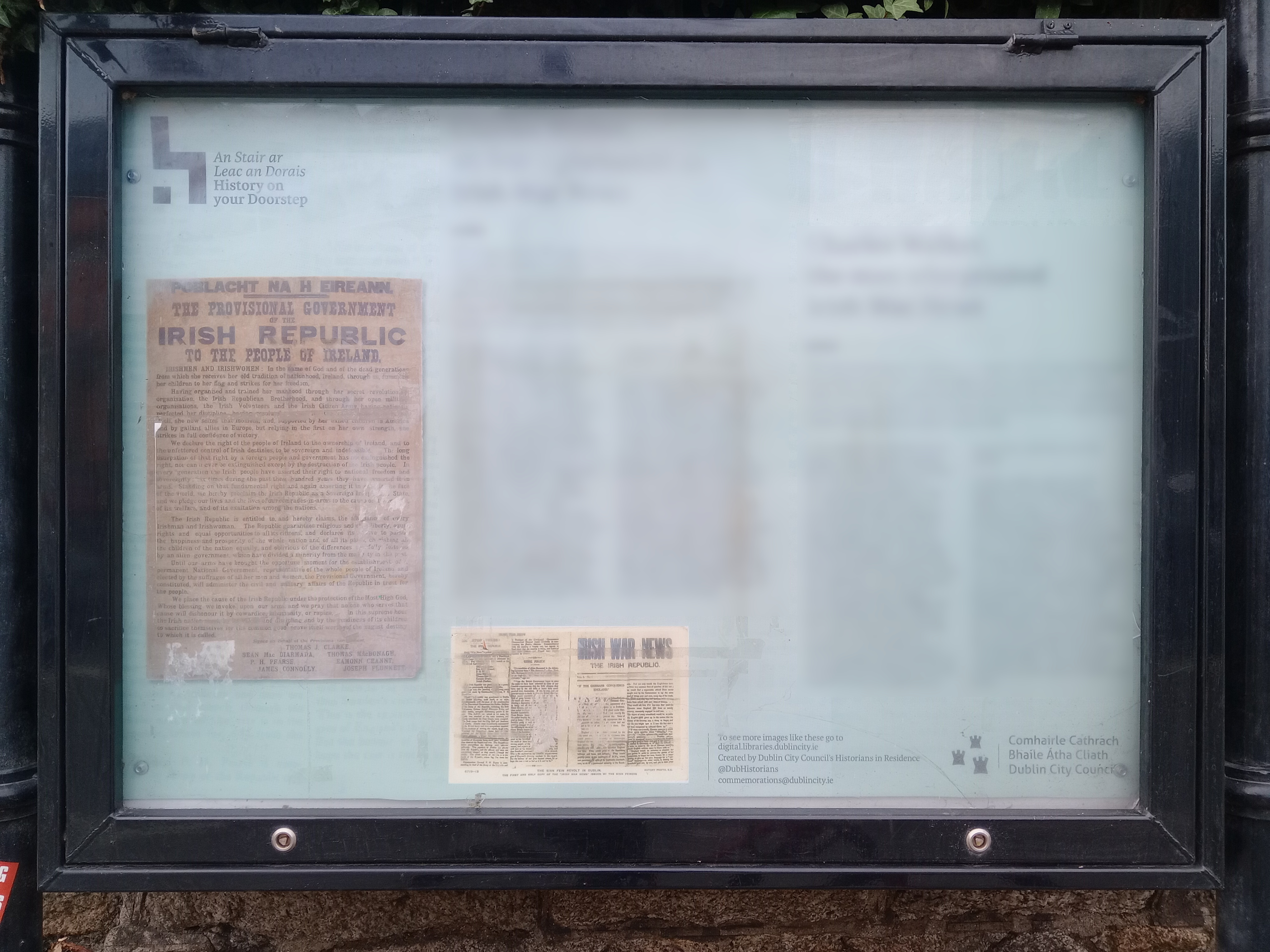
Sign about Irish War News in Drumcondra (Copyrighted publications are blurred)

The original issue of Irish War News was a bulletin written by Patrick Pearse on 25 April 1916. It was printed by Charles Walker on Halston Street, Dublin and published from the General Post Office. The publication contained a copy of the Proclamation of the Irish Republic.

Following the execution of the rising's leaders, copies of Irish War News were collected by soldiers as souvenirs and memorabilia of the rising.

In 1916, The Western Argus referred to the publication as an "Official rebel newspaper" and the "first republican newspaper". In 2006, the Irish Political Review claimed that some people think if the rising lasted three weeks, Patrick Pearse would not be as famous because he "spent most of the week behind a typewriter hammering out the Irish War News". In 2016, History Ireland described Irish War News as "the rebels' communiqué from the GPO" [sic]. RTÉ's Century Ireland project described it as "as close as newspapers came to reporting the events of Easter week faithfully and fast".

== Legacy ==
Like most publications from the rising, copies of Irish War News are considered scarce.

A copy of Irish War News is currently in the National Museum of Ireland - Collins Barracks as part of their Proclaiming a Republic: The 1916 Rising exhibition.
