= Memory Bridge =

U.S. nonprofit organization

Memory Bridge, founded in 2004 as The Foundation for Alzheimer's and Cultural Memory, is an American nonprofit organization that creates programs that connect people with Alzheimer's disease to family, friends, and other people in their local community.

== Mission ==
The mission of Memory Bridge is: "To create a global community of people who, like us, are learning to listen to people with dementia for what they have to teach us about our own humanity." Approximately 5 million Americans are currently living with Alzheimer's disease.

=== Action Directives ===
Memory Bridge's action directives are:

- Educate - Teach children how to communicate with people with Alzheimer's and related dementias in emotionally meaningful ways
- Create - Create world-class educational products and resources that transform our currently reductive assumptions about persons with dementia
- Build Communities - Establish an internet-supported community of persons around the world invested in learning how to communicate with people with dementia in emotionally meaningful ways
- Collaborate - Develop relationships with local and national schools, museums, and other educational, medical, social services organization, etc. to create curricula and to organize events, exhibitions, and programs that support our educational mission
- Advocate - To raise awareness about aspects of personal identity and memory that Alzheimer's disease does not extinguish

== Programs ==
The Memory Bridge Initiative is a twelve-week, curriculum-based after-school program for junior high and high school students. Students are paired with residents of nearby long-term care facilities with Alzheimer's disease or related dementias. The student and person with dementia meet four times over the twelve-week course. The program develops students' emotional and social intelligence while keeping individuals with Alzheimer's disease in long-term care facilities meaningfully connected to people in their community.

The Memory Bridge Initiative follows a curriculum that was created by The Foundation for Alzheimer's and Cultural Memory. The curriculum uses diverse approaches to learning, combining individual reflection, arts projects, group discussion, and role-playing to teach empathy and communication skills. Memory Bridge has also created experiential modules in conjunction with experts in their fields to facilitate relationship-building through photography, dance, music, and touch. The Memory Bridge Initiative began in Chicago in January 2005 and has since been adopted by schools and long-term care facilities in Texas, Vermont, and Ohio. In 2006, the Memory Bridge Initiative received the Innovative Program Award from the Illinois Council on Long Term Care.

== There Is a Bridge ==
There Is a Bridge is a documentary, hosted by former United States Poet Laureate Robert Pinsky, that was released in September 2007 by Memory Bridge. "The film weaves together mental health, psychology, art, philosophy and education to highlight the individuals and programs reaching out to elders suffering from Alzheimer's disease and dementia. Moving and provocative, the documentary illuminates the possibility for meaningful connections regardless of a person's cognitive impairments." The documentary airs on PBS stations nationwide.

== Memory Bridge Forum ==
The Memory Bridge Forum was created as an online space for family members, professional caregivers, and people with dementia to share their stories of communication and connection. With stories submitted from countries around the world – India, Israel, and Mexico among them – the forum is one of the ways Memory Bridge connects people who are learning to listen to people with Alzheimer's disease.

== See also ==
- Dementia
- Alzheimer's in the media
