= Ancient Order of Hibernians =

Irish Catholic fraternal organisation primarily active in the US

- AOH
- Founded: 4 May 1836; 190 years ago New York City, New York, US
- Type: Fraternal order
- Affiliation: Independent
- Status: Active
- Emphasis: Irish Catholic
- Scope: International
- Colors: Green, White and Orange
- Headquarters: PO Box 437; Oreland, Pennsylvania 19075-0437; United States
- Website: aoh.com

The Ancient Order of Hibernians (AOH; Irish: Ord Ársa na nÉireannach) is an Irish Catholic fraternal organization. Members must be male, Catholic, and either born in Ireland or of Irish descent. Its largest membership is in the United States, where it was founded in New York City in 1836.

The name was adopted by groups of Irish immigrants in the United States, its purpose to act as guards to shield Catholic churches from anti-Catholic forces in the mid-19th century, and to assist Irish Catholic immigrants, especially those who faced discrimination or harsh coal mining working conditions. Many members in the coal mining area of Pennsylvania allegedly had a background with the Molly Maguires. It became an important focus of Irish American political activity.

== Ireland ==
=== Origins ===
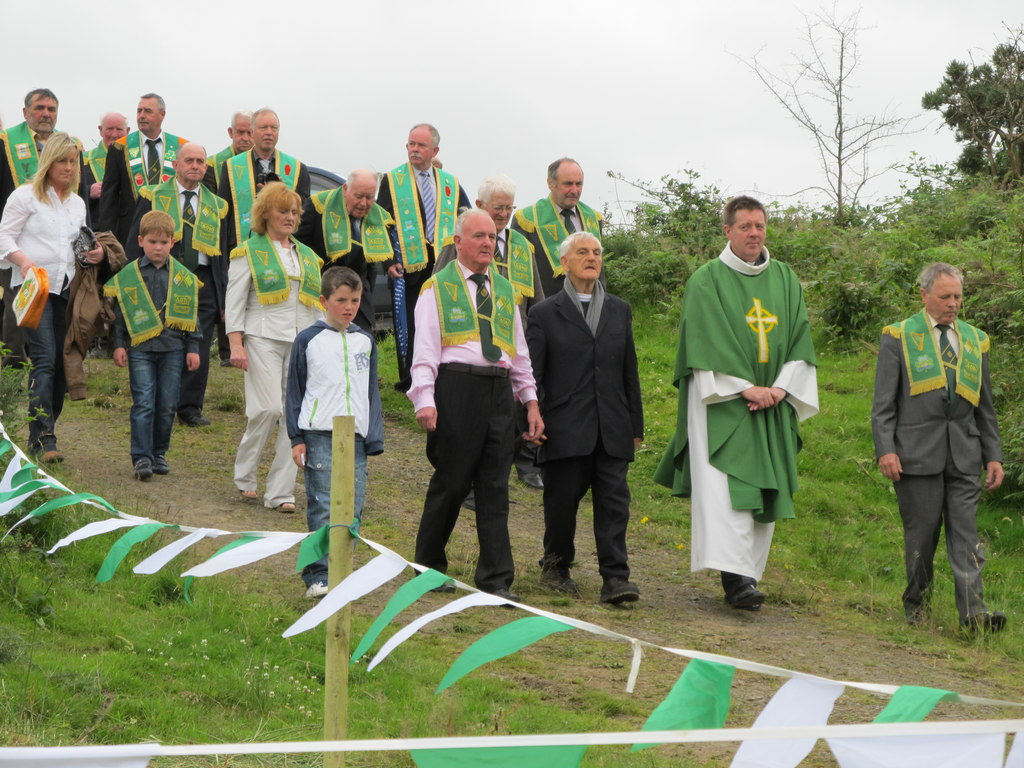
Members of the AOH parading at Cormeen, Co Cavan

The organization had its roots in the Defenders and the Ribbonmen, Catholic agrarian movements of the 18th and 19th centuries. It emerged in Ulster at the end of the 19th century in opposition to the Orange Order. It was organized by Joseph Devlin of Belfast, who was Grand Master by 1905. The AOH was closely associated with the Irish Parliamentary Party, its members mainly members of the party. It was strongly opposed to secular ideologies such as those of the Irish Republican Brotherhood (the IRB), who were most unhappy at the re-emergence of this old rival "right-wing" nationalist society.

From a membership of 5,000 in 1900, nearly all in Ulster, it climbed to 64,000 by 1909, complementing the United Irish League. By 1914 the order had spread throughout the country, mainly because of its utility as a patronage, brokerage and recreational association. As a vehicle for Irish nationalism, the AOH greatly influenced the sectarian aspect of Irish politics in the early twentieth century. In Ulster and elsewhere it acted as an unruly but vigorous militant support organization for Devlin, Dillon and Redmond against radicals and against William O'Brien: O'Brien regarded himself as having been driven from the party by militant Hibernians at the "Baton Convention" of 1909.

The ceremonial aspects of the Order resembled those of the Orange Order with green replacing orange on sashes and banners. This led to opponents such as Jim Larkin calling it the "Ancient Order of Catholic Orangemen".

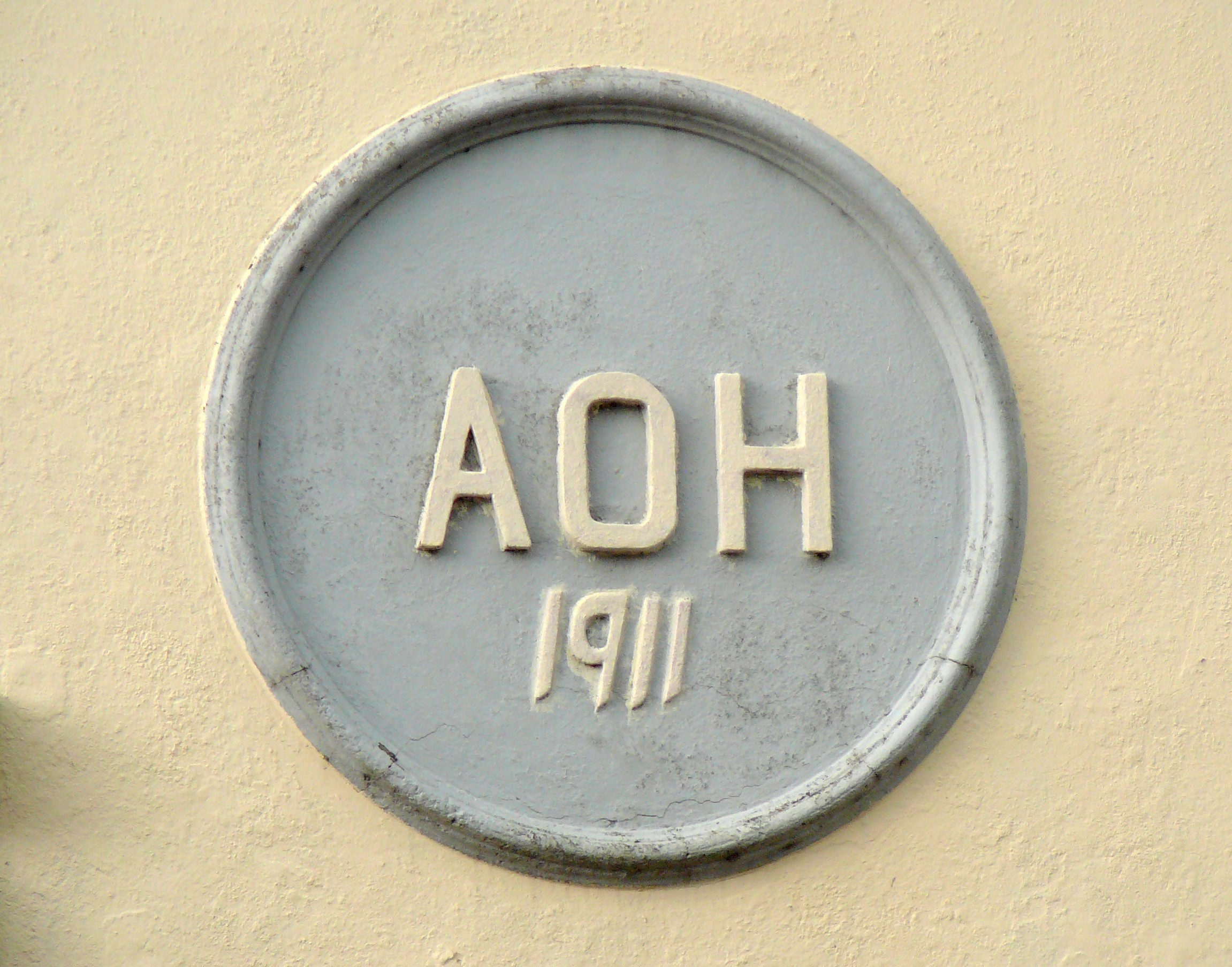
AOH 1911 plaque, Kanturk, County Cork

=== After 1916 ===
After the 1916 Easter Rising the organisation declined outside of Ulster, its members absorbed into Sinn Féin and the Irish Republican Army (the IRA). In many areas the organisation provided by the AOH was the nearest thing to a paramilitary force. On the other hand, on 13 June 1916 Joe Devlin chaired an AOH Convention in Dublin that approved the proposed partition of Ireland by 475 votes to 265.

Many republican leaders in the 1916–1923 period, among them Seán Mac Diarmada, J. J. Walsh, and Rory O'Connor, had been "Hibs" before the formation of the Irish Volunteers in 1913.

The AOH is also significant as a link between the new nationalist organisations and the century-old tradition of popular militant societies. More directly, it lingered on as a pro-Treaty support organisation. Some Hibernians fought in the Irish Brigade in the Spanish Civil War. The quasi-Fascist Blueshirts movement of the 1930s may, in fact, have owed as much to the Ribbon tradition which it so much resembled, as it did to continental analogies.

=== Recent decades ===
Within Ulster generally, but especially within Northern Ireland, the AOH remains a visible but somewhat marginal part of the Catholic community. It parades at Easter, Lady Day and a few other times a year.

At the beginning of The Troubles, the AOH placed a voluntary ban on its members parading until 1975, though records of some parades taking place in defiance of the ban were reported. In 1978 an estimated 10,000 participants attended a parade in Kilrea. Since then there has been a rapid decrease of numbers and usually around twenty divisions parade at a single location.

The locations of AOH parades in Northern Ireland generally tend to be cities with a high Catholic population, coupled with the AOH's desire not to provoke trouble. County Fermanagh has never hosted an AOH parade since the onset of The Troubles and County Armagh has held one. The majority of the 21 locations for parades have been in counties Antrim, Down and Londonderry. On occasion when the parade has been held in an area with a significant loyalist population it has been met with an aggressive protest, notably Garvagh in 1985 and Armoy in 1989 which held its first AOH parade in 35 years.

== United States ==
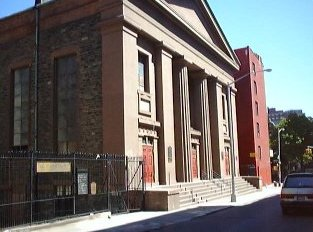
St. James Church, New York City

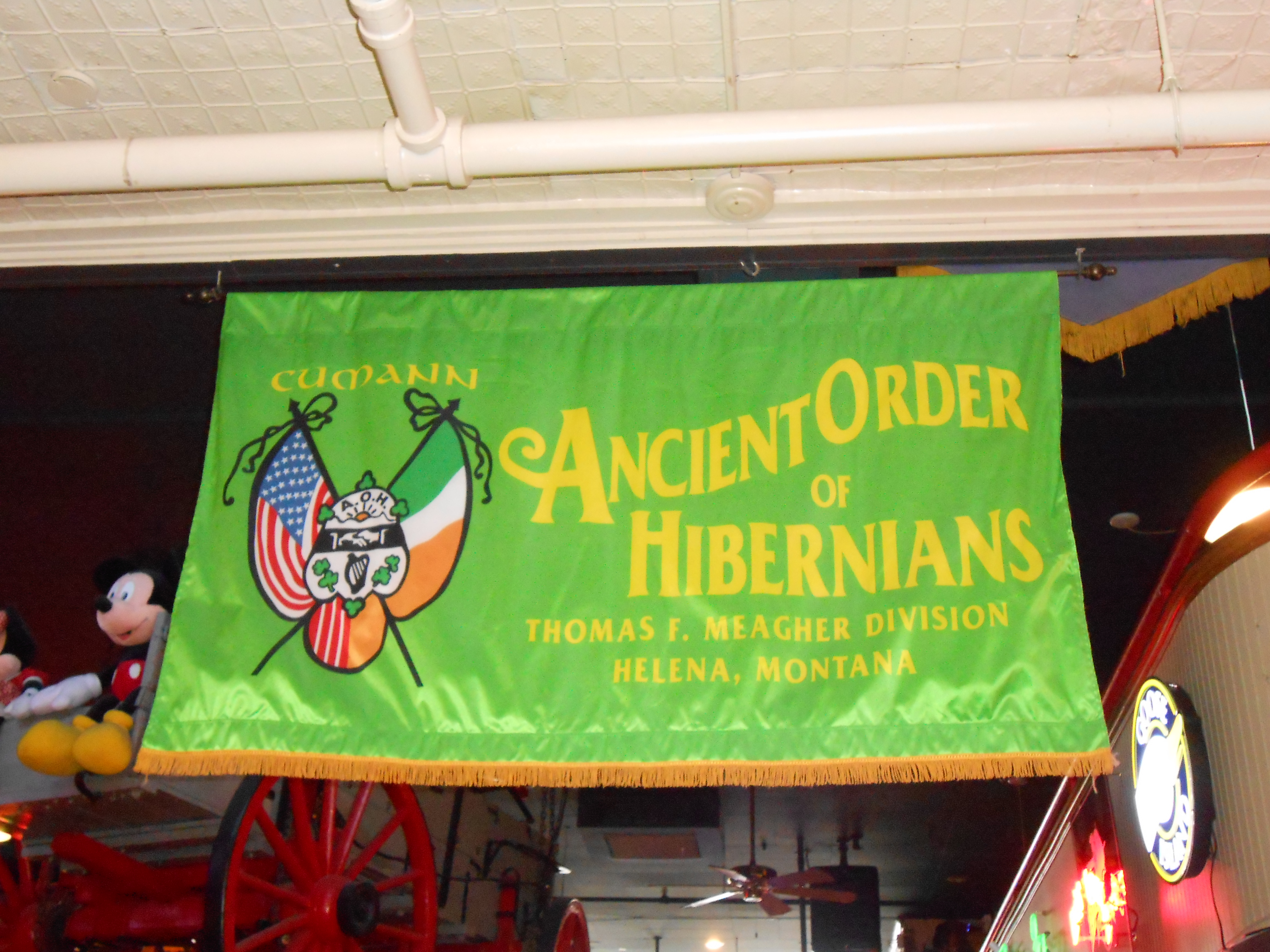
Helena, Montana Chapter of the Ancient Order of Hibernians banner

=== Early years ===
The order was founded in the United States on 4 May 1836, at St. James Church in New York City, near the old Five Points neighbourhood. A branch was formed the same year at Pottsville, Pennsylvania. The existence and activities of the order were concealed for some years.

In 1850, members prevented the burning of St. Patrick's Old Cathedral by mobs of anti-Catholic Know Nothings.

During the late 1860s and early 1870s many of the lodges of the order in Pennsylvania were infiltrated by the Molly Maguires. However the Molly Maguires and their criminal activities were condemned at the 1876 national convention of the AOH and the order was reorganised in the Pennsylvania coal areas.

=== Split, reunion and auxiliary ===
In 1884 there was a split in the organisation. The order had previously been governed by the Board of Erin, which had governed the order in Ireland, Great Britain and the United States, but was composed of officers selected exclusively by the organisations in Ireland and Great Britain. The majority left in 1884 and became the Ancient Order of Hibernians of America (A.O.H. (Irish-American Alliance)), while the small earlier group called itself Ancient Order of Hibernians, Board of Erin (A.O.H (B.O.E.)). In 1897 the Ancient Order of Hibernians, Board of Erin, had approximately 40,000 members concentrated in New York, New Jersey, Ohio, Illinois and Michigan, while the Ancient Order of Hibernians of America had nearly 125,000 members scattered throughout nearly every state in the union. The two groups reunited in 1898.

A female auxiliary, the Daughters of Erin, was formed in 1894, and had 20,000 members in 1897. It was attached to the larger, "American" version of the order.

In 1883, Bucks County Division 1 was formed in Bristol, Pennsylvania. It is the oldest continuously chartered division in Pennsylvania and one of the oldest in the United States. The Bucks County Division 1 Clubhouse, constructed in 1893, is believed to be one of the oldest, continuously operated AOH Halls. Michael Dougherty, a Division 1 Charter Member, was an Irish immigrant from Falcarragh, County Donegal, Ireland, is the Division 1 Namesake. He was awarded the Congressional Medal of Honor for his service during the Civil War, where he served in the Union Army with the Second Irish Dragons.

In 1898, the Port Richmond Division 87 was formed in Philadelphia, Pennsylvania. It remains one of the oldest continuously chartered divisions within the Philadelphia County Board and Pennsylvania State Board.

The Ladies Auxiliary of the Ancient Order of Hibernians raised $50,000 to build the Nuns of the Battlefield sculpture in Washington, D.C., which the United States Congress authorised in 1918. The Irish-American sculptor, Jerome Connor, ended up suing the order for non-payment.

John F. Kennedy joined the AOH in 1947. The AOH's national chaplains have included prominent clergymen such as Archbishop Fulton J. Sheen and Cardinal Francis Spellman.

=== 1960s onwards ===
The AOH had 181,000 members in 1965, and 171,000 in 736 local units or "Divisions" in 1979.

U.S. Congressman Mario Biaggi received the Ancient Order of Hibernians Friend of the Irish Award in 2011.

In 1982, in a revival of Hibernianism, the Thomas Francis Meagher Division No. 1 formed in Helena, Montana, dedicated to the principles of the order and to restoring a historically accurate record of Brigadier General Meagher's contributions to Montana. Soon after, six additional divisions formed in Montana.

The Brothers of St. Patrick Division of the Ancient Order of Hibernians in America was established at Brothers of St. Patrick in Midway City, California, in 1995. In 1997, the first division in Tennessee, the James Dardis Division No. 1, was formed in Knoxville Tennessee.

In 2002, the Fr. Bernard Donnelly Division was established in Johnson County, Kansas dedicated to community service and reintroducing Hibernianism to Kansas. Its name honors the founder of Kansas City's Irish Community, Fr. Bernard Donnelly (c. 1800–1880), an immigrant from County Cavan.

In 2013, The Ancient Order of Hibernians raised and distributed over $200,000 to aid victims of Hurricane Sandy. In 2014, the AOH called for a boycott of the retailer Spencer's for selling products the AOH says promote anti-Irish stereotypes and irresponsible drinking. On 10 May 2014 a memorial to John Barry, an immigrant to the US from Wexford who was a naval commander of the American Revolution and who holds commission number one in the subsequent U.S. Navy, was dedicated on the grounds of the United States Naval Academy. The memorial and associated "Barry Gate" was presented to the academy by the members of the Ancient Order of Hibernians.

On 17 August 2017, the John Fitzgerald Division was chartered in Lincoln, Nebraska. On 23 April 2019, the first division in Arizona, No. 1, was formed in Phoenix, Arizona. The division was formed on the grounds of the Irish Cultural Center.

== Symbols ==
At formal events, members wear a green blazer and an Irish tricolor sash of green, white, and orange.

== Activities ==
The order organised the New York City St. Patrick's Day Parade for 150 years until 1993, when control was transferred to an independent committee amid controversy over the exclusion of Irish-American gay and lesbian groups and after Mayor Dinkins for that reason had boycotted the 1992 parade.

== Buildings ==
Several buildings of the Ancient Order of Hibernians are listed on the U.S. National Register of Historic Places or are otherwise notable.

== See also ==
- Banners in Northern Ireland
- Friends of Irish Freedom
- Hibernian Rifles
- Knights of Equity
- Parades in Northern Ireland § Ancient Order of Hibernians
