= Henrietta Bruckman =

American Jewish fraternity organizer (1810–1888)

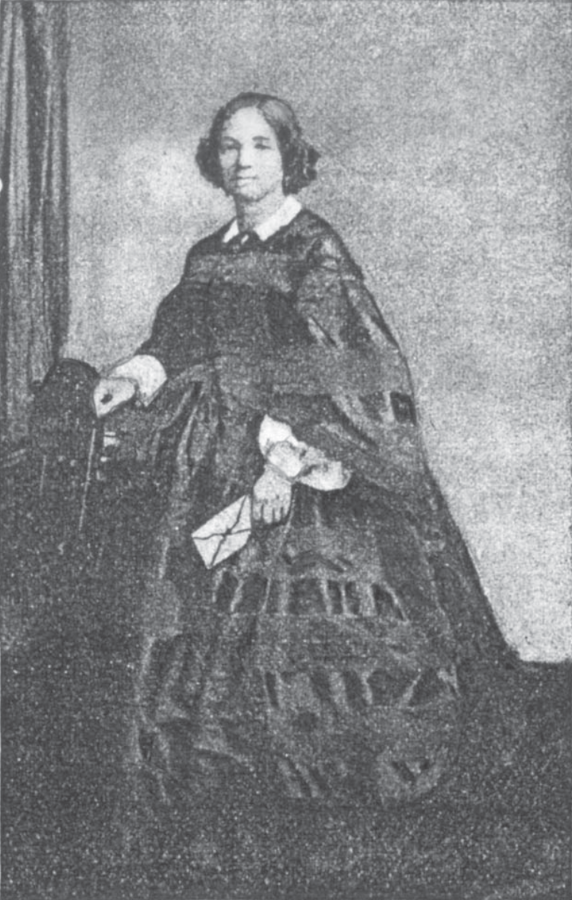
- Born: Henrietta Kahn; April 1810; Bohemia, Austrian Empire
- Died: April 1888 (aged 77–78); New York City, US
- Known for: Founder of the first fraternal organization for Jewish women in the United States

Henrietta Bruckman (née Kahn; April 1810 – April 1888) was founder of the first fraternal organization for Jewish women in the United States.

== Biography ==
Bruckman was born in Bohemia in 1810 and immigrated to the United States with her husband, the physician Dr. Philip Bruckman, around 1842. They settled in New York City and quickly became active members of the city's German Jewish immigrant community, supporting charitable causes and taking part in the community's cultural activities. Philip was a founder of the Mendelssohnian Society, a forerunner of the Jewish fraternal order B'nai B'rith.

In 1846, Bruckman had the idea to form a female counterpart to B'nai B'rith to support Jewish women in the city. She approached several women from Congregation Emanu-El with her proposal, and convened an informal meeting at her house. This led to the creation on April 21 of the secret benevolent society "Unabhängiger Orden Treuer Schwestern" (Independent Order of True Sisters), later known as the United Order of True Sisters (UOTS). The first lodge was named Emanuel Lodge #1, and Bruckman was appointed its first president.

Though B'nai B'rith was not open to women, the UOTS received support from several influential members of the organization, as well as from Emanu-El's minister, Rabbi Dr. Leo Merzbacher. The UOTS adopted a secret ritual, degrees, regalia, and an emblem. Its meetings were initially conducted entirely in German. By the mid-1860s, a central Constitution Grand Lodge had been formed, and the organization had grown to include five other lodges across New York, Connecticut, and Pennsylvania.
