= Knights of Equity =

American Irish Catholic fraternal organization

- Abbreviation: KOE
- Formation: 1895
- Type: Irish-Catholic; American fraternal order
- Website: knightsofequity.org

The Knights of Equity (KOE) (Irish: Ridirí Córa) is an Irish Catholic fraternal organization established in the United States in 1895 and still in active operation in the 21st century. The group is among the oldest Irish-Catholic membership associations in America. With some 65 local chapters, called "courts," during its period of greatest influence, the group was an important Catholic political and fraternal benefit society. The early society organized Irish Catholics in America against discrimination and gave financial aid to impoverished Irish immigrants.

== Organizational history ==
=== Establishment ===
The Knights of Equity (KOE) was established in Cleveland, Ohio in 1895, making it one of the oldest Irish-Catholic organizations in America. Although the group's articles of incorporation innocuously stated the group's purpose as the creation of "a spirit of mutual helpfulness among its members; to advance them intellectually and socially; and by co-operation among them, to promote their material interests and well-being," in practice the organization served economic and political functions, lending aid to needy Irish immigrants and organizing to fight bigotry and discrimination against the Irish in America. Of prime importance to the early organization were orphans, the indigent elderly, and financially strapped young men pursuing Catholic priesthood.

Cleveland proved to be a fertile ground for organization, and the Knights of Equity soon had established three local groups, known as "courts," in the city — the largest of which had some 5,000 members. Other Irish communities throughout the Eastern and Midwestern United States soon followed the Cleveland example, establishing local courts of their own. At the peak of the organization's size and influence during its first decade, the Knights of Equity included some 65 local courts stretching from Boston in the East to Sioux City, Iowa in the West, and from the Canada–US border to the Mid-South.

In its earliest incarnation, the Knights of Equity was part of the broad Catholic reaction to the Protestant chauvinism espoused by the American Protective Association (APA), an anti-Catholic secret society established in 1887. Working together with other Catholic groups, the Knights of Equity managed to isolate and neutralize the APA and its anti-immigrant nationalism by the end of the 19th century.

=== Membership ===
Membership in the organisation was open to men 21 years or older of Irish birth or extraction, who were practicing members of the Catholic Church, and who resided in a city where the organization had a local court. The group functioned as a secret society, making use of esoteric ritual, including a four-degree system of initiation.

The organization is governed by an executive body known as the Supreme Council, headed by a chief executive officer known as the Worthy Supreme Sir Knight (WSSK).

=== Later development ===
As their goals of non-discrimination, equal rights, and the financial security of Irish-Americans were accomplished over many decades, membership declined, and the social and philanthropic aspects of the organization gained increased importance.

The center of the Knights of Equity's organizational strength over many decades has been in Pittsburgh, Pennsylvania. As early as 1908 the organization held its ninth annual convention in that city, a three-day affair attended by 500 members from 63 cities. Following World War II, in 1948 there remained about 1,100 members of the KOE in Pittsburgh alone, and that year the 53rd annual Knights of Equity convention, held again in Pittsburgh, was attended by 500 delegates from 11 cities of the East and Midwest. At the 1948 convention the group emphasized its patriotic nature, with assembled delegates demonstratively joining in a so-called "Freedom Pledge" to fight Communism. The Pittsburgh court also hosted annual St. Patrick's Day banquets, and in 1949 sponsored a football team.

In 1954 the Knights of Equity added a women's auxiliary, known as the Daughters of Erin (DOE), to be composed of wives and sisters of KOE members. The DOE were to "aid the Knights of Equity financially, socially, and to further its aim, principles and causes," as well as to "participate in Catholic action and contribute to charity" and "foster Americanism."

As of 2012 three active Knights of Equity Courts remain: "Court 9" in Pittsburgh, "Court 5" in Buffalo, New York, and "Court 6" in Detroit, Michigan. The group today provides scholarships and conducts other philanthropic activities.

=== Archival holdings ===
There are two partial archival holdings dedicated to the Knights of Equity, a small collection of early material at the Western Reserve Historical Society in Cleveland, and a more extensive holding of later material dealing with Pittsburgh's Court 9, housed at the University of Pittsburgh. The Pittsburgh material is available on three reels of microfilm.

== See also ==
- Ancient Order of Hibernians
- Irish-American – Discrimination
