= William Penn Association =

America fraternal association for Hungarian immigrants

- Established: February 21, 1886; 140 years ago
- Founded at: Hazleton, Pennsylvania, United States
- Type: Mutual aid society
- Region served: United States
- Website: wpalife.org

The William Penn Association is an American fraternal benefit society that was created through the merger of a number of Hungarian American fraternal organizations such as the Verhovay Aid Association. Today the organization is open to people of any ethnicity and is licensed to sell insurance in 20 states.

== History ==
The William Penn Association dates its origin to February 21, 1886, when thirteen Hungarian American miners formed the Verhovay Aid Association in Hazleton, Pennsylvania. The Verhovay Aid Association was chartered in December of that year by the State. By 1926, Verhovay was the largest and most successful Hungarian American fraternal with 300 chapters throughout the Northeastern United States. That year the headquarters was moved to Pittsburgh.

Over time, other Hungarian fraternals merged into Verhavy including the Workingmen’s Sick Benefit Federation (Munkás Betegsegélyzo Egyesület) of East Pittsburgh, Pennsylvania and the Hungarian Budapest Society (Magyar Baptista Egylet) of Cleveland, Ohio. The largest merger was with the Rákóczi Aid Association of Bridgeport, Connecticut in 1955. This merger of the two largest Hungarian fraternals gave birth to William Penn Fraternal Association. It became the William Penn Association in 1971. Other mergers included the American Life Insurance Association (Bridgeporti Szövetség) in 1979, the American Hungarian Catholic Society in 1980 and Catholic Knights of St. George in 1983. The last organization was established in 1881.

== Organization ==
Local groups called "Branches", of which there were 85 in 1979. The national authority is the "General Convention" which elects a board of directors. Headquarters in Pittsburgh. Other than providing insurance, the Association also conducts fraternal and charitable activities and promotes the preservation of Hungarian culture.

== Membership ==
Membership is open to men and women regardless of ethnicity. Verhovey had 21,512 members at the end of 1922 In 1955, the year it merged with Rakosi, it had 40,000. In 1968 the William Penn Fraternal Association had 80,000 members, and 65,204 in 1979 (these last two numbers only reflect benefit membership, not social members) It had 70,000 members in 1995.

== Ritual ==
The WPA had a secret ritual.
