= List of Knights of Columbus members =

The following is a partial list of notable living and deceased members of the Knights of Columbus, the world's largest Catholic family, fraternal, and service organization.

== Supreme officers ==
Supreme Knight					Deputy Supreme Knight		Supreme Chaplain	
#	Office holder	Portrait	Term began	Term ended	Office holder	Term	Office holder	Term
1	James T. Mullen		March 29, 1882	May 17, 1886	John T. Kerrigan	1882–1884	Rev. Patrick P. Lawlor	1882–1884
1	James T. Mullen		March 29, 1882	May 17, 1886	John F. Dowling	1884–1886	Rev. Michael J. McGivney	1884–1890
2	John J. Phelan		May 17, 1886	March 2, 1897	William Hassett	1886–1887	Rev. Michael J. McGivney	1884–1890
2	John J. Phelan		May 17, 1886	March 2, 1897	James C. Roach	1887–1895	Rev. Michael J. McGivney	1884–1890
2	John J. Phelan		May 17, 1886	March 2, 1897	James C. Roach	1887–1895	Rev. Hugh Treanor	1891–1899
2	John J. Phelan		May 17, 1886	March 2, 1897	James E. Hayes	1895–1897	Rev. Hugh Treanor	1891–1899
3	James E. Hayes		March 2, 1897	February 8, 1898	John J. Cone	1897–1898	Rev. Hugh Treanor	1891–1899
4	John J. Cone		March 2, 1898	March 31, 1899	Vacant		Rev. Hugh Treanor	1891–1899
5	Edward L. Hearn		April 1, 1899	August 31, 1909	John W. Hogan	April 1, 1899–June 3, 1903	Rev. Garrett J. Barry	1899–1901
5	Edward L. Hearn		April 1, 1899	August 31, 1909	John W. Hogan	April 1, 1899–June 3, 1903	Rev. Patrick J. McGivney	1901–1928
5	Edward L. Hearn		April 1, 1899	August 31, 1909	Patrick L. McArdle	June 3, 1903–1905	Rev. Patrick J. McGivney	1901–1928
5	Edward L. Hearn		April 1, 1899	August 31, 1909	James A. Flaherty	1905–1909	Rev. Patrick J. McGivney	1901–1928
6	James A. Flaherty		September 1, 1909	August 31, 1927	Martin H. Carmody	1909–1927	Rev. Patrick J. McGivney	1901–1928
7	Martin H. Carmody		September 1, 1927	August 31, 1939	John F. Martin	1927–1933	Rev. Patrick J. McGivney	1901–1928
7	Martin H. Carmody		September 1, 1927	August 31, 1939	John F. Martin	1927–1933	Rev. John J. McGivney	1928–1939
7	Martin H. Carmody		September 1, 1927	August 31, 1939	Francis P. Matthews	1933–1939	Rev. John J. McGivney	1928–1939
8	Francis P. Matthews		September 2, 1939	October 14, 1945	John E. Swift	1939–1945	Rev. Leo M. Finn	1939–1960
9	John E. Swift		October 24, 1945	August 31, 1953	Timothy P. Galvin	1945–1949	Rev. Leo M. Finn	1939–1960
9	John E. Swift		October 24, 1945	August 31, 1953	William J. Mulligan	1949–1960	Rev. Leo M. Finn	1939–1960
10	Luke E. Hart		September 1, 1953	February 19, 1964	William J. Mulligan	1949–1960	Rev. Leo M. Finn	1939–1960
10	Luke E. Hart		September 1, 1953	February 19, 1964	John W. McDevitt	1960–1964	Bishop Charles P. Greco	1961–January 20, 1987
11	John W. McDevitt		February 22, 1964	January 21, 1977	John H. Griffin, MD	1964–1966	Bishop Charles P. Greco	1961–January 20, 1987
11	John W. McDevitt		February 22, 1964	January 21, 1977	Charles J. Ducey	1966–April 1976	Bishop Charles P. Greco	1961–January 20, 1987
11	John W. McDevitt		February 22, 1964	January 21, 1977	Ernest J. Wolff	1976–1977	Bishop Charles P. Greco	1961–January 20, 1987
12	Virgil C. Dechant		January 21, 1977	September 30, 2000	Frederick H. Pelletier	1977–1981	Bishop Charles P. Greco	1961–January 20, 1987
12	Virgil C. Dechant		January 21, 1977	September 30, 2000	John M. Murphy	1981–1984	Bishop Charles P. Greco	1961–January 20, 1987
12	Virgil C. Dechant		January 21, 1977	September 30, 2000	Ellis D. Flinn	1984–February 1, 1997	Bishop Charles P. Greco	1961–January 20, 1987
12	Virgil C. Dechant		January 21, 1977	September 30, 2000	Ellis D. Flinn	1984–February 1, 1997	Bishop Thomas V. Daily	February 13, 1987–April 1, 2005
12	Virgil C. Dechant		January 21, 1977	September 30, 2000	Robert F. Wade	April 1, 1997–September 30, 2000	Bishop Thomas V. Daily	February 13, 1987–April 1, 2005
13	Carl A. Anderson		October 1, 2000	February 28, 2021	Jean B. Migneault	October 1, 2000–October 27, 2006	Bishop Thomas V. Daily	February 13, 1987–April 1, 2005
13	Carl A. Anderson		October 1, 2000	February 28, 2021	Jean B. Migneault	October 1, 2000–October 27, 2006	Archbishop William E. Lori	April 2, 2005–present
13	Carl A. Anderson		October 1, 2000	February 28, 2021	Dennis A. Savoie	October 27, 2006–December 2013	Archbishop William E. Lori	April 2, 2005–present
13	Carl A. Anderson		October 1, 2000	February 28, 2021	Logan T. Ludwig	December 12, 2013–December 16, 2016	Archbishop William E. Lori	April 2, 2005–present
13	Carl A. Anderson		October 1, 2000	February 28, 2021	Patrick E. Kelly	January 1, 2017–February 28, 2021	Archbishop William E. Lori	April 2, 2005–present
14	Patrick E. Kelly		March 1, 2021	present	Paul O'Sullivan	June 9, 2021–July 1, 2023	Archbishop William E. Lori	April 2, 2005–present
14	Patrick E. Kelly		March 1, 2021	present	Arthur L. Peters	July 1, 2023-present	Archbishop William E. Lori	April 2, 2005–present

== Politics and public service ==
=== Judicial branch ===
- Samuel Alito, Associate Justice of the U.S. Supreme Court
- Timothy T. Cronin, U.S. Attorney for the Eastern District of Wisconsin
- Dan Flanagan, Justice of the Indiana Supreme Court
- George Clinton Sweeney, Chief Judge of the United States District Court for the District of Massachusetts
- Peter J. Phipps, Judge of the United States Court of Appeals for the Third Circuit

=== Executive branch ===
- Carl A. Anderson, former special assistant to the President Ronald Reagan (1983–1987) and Supreme Knight of the Knights of Columbus
- Martin Patrick Durkin, former U.S. Secretary of Labor
- Raymond Flynn, former U.S. ambassador to the Holy See and former Democratic Mayor of Boston
- John F. Kennedy, 35th president of the United States
- Manuel Lujan Jr., former U.S. Secretary of the Interior
- Sargent Shriver, former U.S. ambassador to France and first director of the Peace Corps
- John Volpe, former U.S. Secretary of Transportation and former governor of Massachusetts (1961–1963 & 1965–1969)

=== Legislative branch ===
- John Boehner, former Speaker of the House of Representatives
- Hale Boggs, former U.S. House Majority Leader
- Richard E. Connell, former U.S. Representative from New York
- Jeremiah Denton, former US senator from Alabama, naval officer and Vietnam War POW
- John Dingell, United States Democratic representative from Michigan
- Bob Dornan, pro-life advocate, actor, and former California Republican congressman
- Bernard J. Dwyer, former U.S. Representative from New Jersey
- Mike Fitzpatrick United States Republican congressman from Pennsylvania
- Phil Gingrey, U.S. Republican Congressman from Georgia
- Andrew P. Harris, U.S. Republican congressman from Maryland.
- Joe Heck, U.S. Republican congressman from Nevada.
- Henry Hyde, U.S. Republican congressman from Illinois
- Ted Kennedy, former United States Democratic senator from Massachusetts
- Jeff Landry, United States Republican congressman from Louisiana and Governor of Louisiana (2024–present)
- Joe Manchin, United States Senator from West Virginia
- Alex Mooney, former United States representative from West Virginia
- John McCormack, former Speaker of the U.S. House of Representatives
- Bruce Poliquin, United States Republican representative from Maine
- Edward R. Roybal, former Democratic member of the U.S. House of Representatives from California
- Todd Rokita Republican congressman from Indiana
- Rick Santorum, former Republican United States Senator for Pennsylvania
- John G. Schmitz, former member of the U.S. House of Representatives from Orange County, California

=== State governments ===
==== Governor and Lt. Governor ====
- Terry Branstad, Republican Governor of Iowa
- Jeb Bush, former Republican governor of Florida
- Felix Perez Camacho, Governor of Guam
- Hugh Carey, former Democratic governor of New York
- Paul A. Dever, former governor of Massachusetts
- Thomas Donovan Lieutenant Governor of Illinois, 1933–1937
- John Engler, former Republican governor of Michigan
- T. John Lesinski, former lieutenant governor of Michigan
- Mike Rounds, United States senator and former Republican governor of South Dakota
- Al Smith, former Democratic governor of New York, Democratic nominee for president in 1928
- J. Emile Verret, Lieutenant Governor of Louisiana, 1944–1948
- Malcolm Wilson, former governor of New York
- John Bel Edwards, Governor of Louisiana

==== State legislators ====
- Dan Huberty, member of the Texas House of Representatives from Harris County, Texas
- Joe Ihm, member of the Missouri House of Representatives
- Alfred "Bud" Jetty, former state deputy of South Dakota
- Frank Mazzei, member of Pennsylvania Senate.
- Pat Boyd, Connecticut State Representative
- Paul McMurtry, Representative in the Massachusetts General Court
- Robert F. McPartlin, Democratic member of the Illinois House of Representatives from 1960 to 1976.
- William D. Mullins, member of the Massachusetts House of Representatives
- Dennis Paul, member of the Texas House from Harris County
- Joe Picozzi, member of the Pennsylvania State Senate, 5th District
- Thomas P. Sinnett, member of the Illinois House of Representatives from 1924 to 1938. Party Floor Leader from 1933 to 1934.
- Louis Tobacco, New York State Assembly Member 62nd District
- Carlos Truan, member of both houses of the Texas Legislature
- Caesar Trunzo former Republican state senator from New York.
- Carl M. Vogel, member of both houses of the Missouri State Legislature from Jefferson City
- Albert J. Lepore former member of the Rhode Island House of Representatives from North Providence

===== Louisiana =====
- Bo Ackal, member of the Louisiana House of Representatives for Iberia and St. Martin parishes, 1972–1996
- Jeff Arnold, member of the Louisiana House of Representatives from New Orleans
- Armand Brinkhaus, former member of both houses of the Louisiana State Legislature from St. Landry Parish
- Edward S. Bopp, member of the Louisiana House from 1977 to 1984
- Dennis Paul Hebert, member of the Louisiana House of Representatives, 1972–1996
- Sam A. LeBlanc III, member of the Louisiana House of Representatives from 1972 to 1980 for Orleans and Jefferson parishes; resident of St. Francisville in West Feliciana Parish
- Samuel A. LeBlanc I, member of the Louisiana House of Representatives from 1912 to 1916; state court judge from 1920 to 1954
- Gregory A. Miller, member of the Louisiana House of Representatives
- Ricky Templet, former Louisiana state representative
- Sam H. Theriot, former Louisiana state representative

===== Wisconsin =====
- William P. Atkinson, member of the Wisconsin State Assembly
- William Banach, member of the Wisconsin State Assembly
- Charles A. Barnard, member of the Wisconsin State Assembly
- Gregor J. Bock, member of the Wisconsin State Assembly
- Everett E. Bolle, member of the Wisconsin State Assembly
- John P. Dobyns, member of the Wisconsin State Assembly
- John L. McEwen, member of the Wisconsin State Assembly
- Gary R. Goyke, member of the Wisconsin State Senate
- Raymond F. Heinzen, member of the Wisconsin State Senate
- Robert T. Huber, member of the Wisconsin State Assembly
- David E. Hutchison, member of the Wisconsin State Assembly
- Henry J. Janssen, member of the Wisconsin State Assembly
- Eugene S. Kaufman, member of the Wisconsin State Assembly
- Stanley J. Lato, member of the Wisconsin State Assembly
- James Lynn, member of the Wisconsin State Assembly
- Thomas A. Manning, member of the Wisconsin State Assembly
- Dale McKenna, member of the Wisconsin State Senate
- David Mogilka, member of the Wisconsin State Assembly
- Richard C. Nowakowski, former member of the Wisconsin State Assembly
- David D. O'Malley, member of the Wisconsin State Assembly
- Thomas D. Ourada, member of the Wisconsin State Assembly
- Bruce Peloquin, member of the Wisconsin State Senate
- Randall J. Radtke, member of the Wisconsin State Assembly
- Valentine P. Rath, member of the Wisconsin State Assembly
- James A. Rutkowski, member of the Wisconsin State Assembly
- Mark Ryan, member of the Wisconsin State Assembly
- Thomas M. Schaus, member of the Wisconsin State Assembly
- Charles J. Schmidt, member of the Wisconsin State Assembly and the Wisconsin State Senate
- William A. Schmidt, member of the Wisconsin State Senate
- Edward Stack, member of the Wisconsin State Assembly
- William T. Sullivan, member of the Wisconsin State Assembly
- Lary J. Swoboda, member of the Wisconsin State Assembly
- Raymond J. Tobiasz, member of the Wisconsin State Assembly
- William W. Ward, member of the Wisconsin State Assembly
- Arthur L. Zimny, member of the Wisconsin State Senate

==== State judiciary ====
- W. Patrick Donlin, Judge of the Wisconsin Court of Appeals

==== Other ====
- Etienne J. Caire, Louisiana businessman, banker, Republican candidate for governor in 1928 against Huey Long
- Ken Cuccinelli, former attorney general of Virginia, Republican candidate for Governor in 2013
- James E. Finnegan, former attorney general of Wisconsin
- John W. Griffin, politician from Ohio
- Vincent B. Murphy, former New York state comptroller

=== Local government ===
- Richard J. Daley, second longest-serving mayor of Chicago
- Roman Denissen, former mayor of Green Bay, Wisconsin
- Tom Galligan, former mayor of Jeffersonville, Indiana
- Dominic Olejniczak, former mayor of Green Bay, Wisconsin
- John F. Shelley, mayor of San Francisco, California (1964–1968)

=== Other politics and public service ===
- John Moran Bailey, chairman of the Democratic National Committee from 1961 to 1968
- Alan Keyes, political activist, author and former diplomat
- Tom Pendergast, Kansas City political boss

=== Non-United States ===
==== Canada ====
- Leo Bernier, former cabinet minister in the Ontario provincial government
- François-Philippe Brais, Canadian lawyer and politician
- Denis Coderre, Canadian Member of Parliament
- Michael Copps Costello, former mayor of Calgary, Alberta
- Chris d'Entremont, Canadian Member of the Legislative Assembly in the Nova Scotia provincial government, former Minister of Health and Acadian Affairs
- Laurent Desjardins, former cabinet minister in the Manitoba provincial government
- Bernard Grandmaître, former cabinet minister in the Ontario provincial government
- James John Edmund Guerin, Canadian Member of Parliament, Mayor of Montreal
- Rob Nicholson, Canadian Member of Parliament, Minister of Justice and Attorney General
- Steven Point, Canadian Lieutenant Governor of British Columbia
- Pablo Rodríguez, Canadian Member of Parliament
- Alfred-Valère Roy, Canadian politician
- Andrew Scheer, former federal leader of the Conservative Party
- Gerry St. Germain, Canadian Senator
- Louis St. Laurent, former prime minister of Canada
- Roger Teillet, former Canadian Minister of Veterans Affairs
- Stephen Woodworth, Canadian Member of Parliament

==== Philippines ====
- Hilario Davide Jr., 20th Chief Justice of the Supreme Court of the Philippines
- Marcelo Fernan, 19th Chief Justice of the Supreme Court of the Philippines
- Gabriel A. Daza, first Filipino electrical engineer and charter member of the Boy Scouts of the Philippines (BSP).
- Rene Sarmiento, Commissioner of the Commission on Elections of the Republic of the Philippines
- Jose C. Reyes 149th Associate Justice of the Supreme Court of the Philippines
- Paolo Benigno “Bam” Aquino IV, Senator of the Republic of the Philippines
- Odellon Mabutin, President of the Philippine Judges Association of the Philippines
- Simeon Dumdum, Jr. Executive Judge of the Regional Trial Court of Cebu City
- Michael Rama, Mayor of Cebu City Philippines
- Gerald Anthony “Samsam” Gullas, Mayor City of Talisay, Cebu, Philippines
- Junard “Ahong” Chan, Congressman, Lapu-lapu, Cebu
- Agapito Bibat, Rear Admiral and Commander of the Philippine Coast Guard

==== South Korea ====
- Chang Myon, second prime minister of South Korea

== The Church ==
=== Saints ===
- One bishop of Mexico and canonized in 2006
  - Saint Rafael Guizar Valencia, Archbishop of Jalapa (bishop) [Feast: October 24]
- Six priests, Mexican Martyrs, canonized in 2000 [Feast: May 21]
  - Saint Pedro de Jesus Maldonado Lucero (priest)
  - Saint Jose Maria Robles Hurtado (priest)
  - Saint Rodrigo Aguilar Alemán (priest)
  - Saint Luis Batiz Sainz (priest)
  - Saint Mateo Correa Magallane (priest)
  - Saint Miguel de la Mora (priest)
- The Order's founder, a priest, who was beatified in 2020
  - Blessed Michael J. McGivney (priest) [Feast: August 13]
- Two priests and a layman, also Mexican Martyrs, beatified in 2005 [Feast: April 25]
  - Blessed Leonardo Pérez Larios (layman)
  - Blessed José Trinidad Rangel Montaño (priest)
  - Blessed Andrés Sola Molist (Claretian priest)
- Puerto Rican layman beatified in 2001.
  - Blessed Carlos Manuel Cecilio Rodríguez Santiago (layman) [Feast: May 4]
- A significant figure in the Catholic Church in Canada, canonized as St. André of Montreal in 2010
  - André Bessette, CSC [Feast: January 6]

=== Cardinals ===
- Cardinal Thomas Collins, Archbishop Emeritus of Toronto
- Cardinal Blase Cupich, Archbishop of Chicago
- Cardinal Daniel DiNardo, Archbishop of Galveston-Houston
- Cardinal Timothy Dolan, Archbishop of New York City
- Cardinal John Patrick Foley, former Grand Master of the Equestrian Order of the Holy Sepulchre of Jerusalem, and former president of the Pontifical Council for Social Communications
- Cardinal Francis George, former Archbishop of Chicago
- Cardinal Gérald Lacroix, Archbishop of Quebec and Primate of Canada
- Cardinal William Joseph Levada, former Prefect of the Congregation for the Doctrine of the Faith and Archbishop Emeritus of San Francisco
- Cardinal Marc Ouellet, PSS, Canadian prelate
- Cardinal Seán Patrick O'Malley, Archbishop of Boston
- Cardinal Justin Rigali, Archbishop Emeritus of Philadelphia
- Cardinal Gaudencio Rosales, Archbishop Emeritus of Manila
- Cardinal Jaime Sin, former Archbishop of Manila
- Cardinal Luis Antonio Tagle, former Archbishop of Manila and Prefect of the Congregation for the Evangelization of Peoples
- Cardinal Donald Wuerl, Archbishop Emeritus of Washington

=== Bishops ===
- Most Rev. Martin John Amos, former Bishop of Davenport, Iowa
- Most Rev. Robert Joseph Baker, Bishop of Birmingham in Alabama
- Most Rev. Charles J. Chaput, O.F.M. Cap., Archbishop of Philadelphia
- Most Rev. Robert Joseph Cunningham, Bishop of Syracuse, New York
- Most Rev. John Francis Donoghue, former Archbishop of Atlanta
- Most Rev. Robert William Finn, Bishop emeritus of Kansas City-St. Joseph
- Most Rev. Joseph Fiorenza, Archbishop Emeritus of Galveston-Houston
- Most Rev. Gustavo Garcia-Siller, Archbishop of San Antonio
- Most Rev. Emilius Goulet, former Archbishop of St. Boniface
- Most Rev. Charles Pasquale Greco, former Bishop of Alexandria, Louisiana, and first Supreme Chaplain of the Knights
- Most Rev. Wilton Daniel Gregory, Archbishop of Atlanta
- Most Rev. Michael Owen Jackels, Archbishop of Dubuque, Iowa
- Most Rev. Joseph Edward Kurtz, Archbishop of Louisville and President of the United States Conference of Catholic Bishops
- Most Rev. Albert LeGatt, Archdiocese of St. Boniface
- Most Rev. William E. Lori, Archbishop of Baltimore and Supreme Chaplain of the Knights of Columbus
- Most Rev. Patrick Joseph McGrath, Bishop of San Jose, California
- Most Rev. J. Michael Miller, CSB, Archbishop of Vancouver
- Most Rev. R. Walker Nickless, Bishop of Sioux City, Iowa
- Most Rev. Richard Pates, Bishop of Des Moines, Iowa
- Venerable Archbishop Fulton J. Sheen, Titular Archbishop of Newport, Wales, TV personality
- Most Rev. Dennis J. Sullivan, Bishop of Camden, New Jersey
- Most Rev. Thomas G. Wenski, archbishop of the Archdiocese of Miami

=== Priests ===
- Rev. James Coyle, Alabama priest who was murdered on August 11, 1921. Member of Mobile Council 666.
- Rev. William F. Davitt, Massachusetts priest who served with the American Expeditionary Forces in France during World War I; the last commissioned officer to be killed during the war; recipient of the US Distinguished Service Cross and the Croix de Guerre
- Rev. John B. DeValles, U.S. Army chaplain
- Rev. Isaias X. Edralin, SJ, United States Army chaplain and POW in the Philippines during World War II
- Rev Robert A. Graham, SJ, "the Vatican spy catcher"
- Rev. John Anthony Kaiser, MHM, a missionary priest martyred while serving in Kenya
- Rev. Stuart Long
- Venerable Patrick Peyton, "the Rosary priest," first honorary Fourth Degree recipient
- Rev. Charles J. Watters, United States Army chaplain and Medal of Honor recipient, killed in action during the Vietnam War
- Rev. George J. Willmann, the "Father McGivney of the Philippines," helping soldiers in Manila during World War II

== Sports and athletics ==
- Lou Albano, professional wrestler and actor
- Matt Birk, former center for the NFL Minnesota Vikings and Baltimore Ravens, 2011 recipient of the Walter Payton NFL Man of the Year Award
- James J. Braddock, "The Cinderella Man", heavyweight boxing champion
- Harrison Butker, NFL kicker for the Kansas City Chiefs
- Walt Chipple, professional baseball player
- James Connolly, first Olympic Gold Medal champion in modern times
- Bill Coughlin, Major League Baseball (MLB) player
- Mike Ditka, Chicago Bears coach
- Johnny Evers, Hall of Fame MLB player
- Chris Godfrey, right guard for the New York Giants and founder of Life Athletes
- Ron Guidry, pitcher who helped lead the New York Yankees to a World Series championship
- Gil Hodges, Hall of Fame MLB player and manager who led the 1969 New York Mets to an improbable World Series win
- Hughie Jennings, Hall of Fame MLB player and manager
- Willie Keeler, Hall of Fame MLB player
- Tom Kelly, first baseman and manager of the Minnesota Twins
- Vince Lombardi, coach of the Green Bay Packers (The Vincent T. Lombardi Council, No. 6552, Knights of Columbus, in Middletown, New Jersey, is named for him.)
- Connie Mack, Hall of Fame baseball manager, player and team owner
- John McGraw, Hall of Fame baseball manager and player
- Cal Murphy, Canadian Football League coach and manager
- Danny Murtaugh, MLB player and Pittsburgh Pirates manager
- Bob O'Neil, Pittsburgh Steelers, New York Titans, Calgary Stampeders, and Montreal Alouettes professional football player
- Floyd Patterson, heavyweight boxing champion
- Andy Rozdilsky, clown for the Chicago White Sox
- Babe Ruth, Hall of Fame baseball player
- Serge Savard, player and manager for the NHL's Montreal Canadiens
- Vin Scully, Baseball Hall of Fame sportscaster for the Brooklyn Dodgers and the Los Angeles Dodgers
- Jim Sorgi, Indianapolis Colts quarterback
- Mike Sweeney, MLB first baseman and DH
- Jim Thorpe, American athlete and Olympian
- Shane Victorino, baseball player
- Ed Walsh, Chicago White Sox pitcher and manager
- Lenny Wilkens, National Basketball Association's second winningest coach
- Trevor Williams, baseball player

== Military ==
- Andrija Artuković, government minister in the Independent State of Croatia who sought refuge in the United States and, following his extradition to Yugoslavia, was convicted of war crimes
- Willibald C. Bianchi, an officer in the Philippine Scouts who received the Medal of Honor for actions in Bataan, Philippines during World War II
- Patrick Henry Brady, a medical helicopter pilot and Medal of Honor recipient during the Vietnam War
- Harold Brown Jr., CIA Officer and U.S. Army Reserve Major who was killed during the Camp Chapman attack
- Edward Byers, a United States Navy SEAL and Medal of Honor recipient while deployed to Afghanistan
- Frank Castellano, Commander, US Navy, commanding officer of the USS Bainbridge (DDG-96) during the Maersk Alabama hijacking
- James Phillip Connor, Sergeant, United States Army, Medal of Honor recipient during World War II
- Daniel Daly, Gunnery Sergeant, United States Marine Corps, two-time Medal of Honor recipient once described by the commandant of the Marine Corps as "the most outstanding Marine of all time"
- Roger Donlon, United States Army officer and first Medal of Honor recipient during the Vietnam War
- Ferdinand Foch, French military general, Supreme Allied Commander on the Western Front during World War I
- Henry Gunther, Sergeant, United States Army, Distinguished Service Cross recipient, last casualty of World War I (10:59 AM)
- Gerry H. Kisters, a United States Army soldier and a recipient of the Medal of Honor for his actions in World War II
- Walter Joseph Marm Jr., a United States Army officer and recipient of the Medal of Honor during the Vietnam War
- Gary M. Rose, Captain, United States Army, Medal of Honor recipient, awarded for risking his life to treat 60–70 personnel, despite being wounded multiple times during Operation Tailwind
- Paul J. Wiedorfer, United States Army soldier and Medal of Honor recipient for his actions in World War II

== Arts and media ==
- Myles Connolly, American writer; Hollywood screenwriter and producer
- Steve Doocy, Journalist and anchor for Fox & Friends
- Paul A. Fisher, American author, journalist and U.S. Army veteran
- John Ford, American film director and producer
- Joyce Kilmer, famous journalist and poet
- Jason O'Toole, vocalist, Life's Blood and poet
- Jerry Orbach, American actor
- Jonathan Roumie, American actor
- Ed Sullivan, television host, reporter and newspaper columnist
- Eduardo Verástegui, prominent Mexican actor
- Jim Wahlberg, American film producer and screenwriter
- Lawrence Welk, bandleader

== Others ==
- Nick Bruno, president of University of Louisiana at Monroe
- Capt. Alfredo "Al" Fuentes, retired New York City fire captain and 9/11 hero
- Conrad Hilton, American hotelier
- Peter Kilpatrick, president of The Catholic University of America
- Gene Kranz, former NASA flight director
- Theodore McCarrick, laicized bishop, former Cardinal-Archbishop of Washington, D.C.
- John Edward "Jack" Reagan, father of President Ronald Reagan
- John H. Reddin, Denver attorney, instrumental in the creation of the Order's Fourth Degree
- Paul D. Scully-Power, world-renowned oceanographer and NASA astronaut
- Francisco Becerril Molina, Compositor de la Oración Oficial de la Adoración Nocturna Mexicana en la Diócesis de Azcapotzalco y Compositor del himno de la Asociación Laical Plancartina de Caballeros de María de Guadalupe.

== Works cited ==
- Dodge, William Wallace (1903). The Fraternal and Modern Banquet Orator: An Original Book of Useful Helps at the Social Session and Assembly of Fraternal Orders, College Entertainments, Social Gatherings and All Banquet Occasions. Chicago: Monarch Book Company.
- Kauffman, Christopher J. (1982). Faith and Fraternalism: The History of the Knights of Columbus, 1882–1982. Harper and Row. ISBN 978-0-06-014940-6.
- Walther, Andrew; Walther, Maureen (2020). The Knights of Columbus: An Illustrated History. Square One Publishers. ISBN 978-0-7570-0308-0.
