= History of the Knights of Columbus and Catholic University of America =

The history of the Knights of Columbus and Catholic University of America is one of "a close and supportive relationship" that dates back almost to the founding of the university. David M. O'Connell, then-president of CUA, has said, "It is difficult to speak about the progress of The Catholic University of America throughout its long history without, at the same time and in the same breath, mentioning the Knights of Columbus. So much of what CUA is today is the result of the generosity and support of the Knights of Columbus." The fourth rector of the University, Monsignor Thomas J. Shahan, congratulated the Order for having founded a "Knights of Columbus College" after a particularly large donation saved the University after a rocky financial period.

Supreme Knight Carl A. Anderson has added that "The Knights of Columbus enjoys a long and well-regarded relationship with Catholic University." Anderson formerly served on the Board of CUA's Trustees.

O'Connell wrote a column for the Knights' magazine, Columbia, thanking the Knights for their assistance throughout the years on the 100th anniversary of the 1904 gift of $50,000, saying, "I cannot imagine what The Catholic University of America would have done if it were not for the Knights of Columbus."

== Early years ==
Both the university and the order were founded in the 1880s, and they have been closely aligned ever since. By 1920, Pope Benedict XV praised the Knights for the commitment to the faith, and singled out their contributions to the University as an example of it.

=== Keane Council ===
On June 5, 1898, Keane Council 353 was established at the university, though it later moved off campus. It was instituted with 66 charter members, with Lawrence O. Murray, Comptroller of the Currency, serving as Grand Knight. It "formed its nucleus in the Catholic University," in the words of Philip Garrigan, one of Keane's founders and vice-rector of the university. The council was named for Irish-born Bishop John J. Keane, the first rector of the University (1889–1896) and later Archbishop of Dubuque, Iowa.

The council initially met in the Typographical Temple, moved to Grand Army Hall on October 12, 1898, and then to the Maccabee Temple the following June.

=== Chair of American History ===
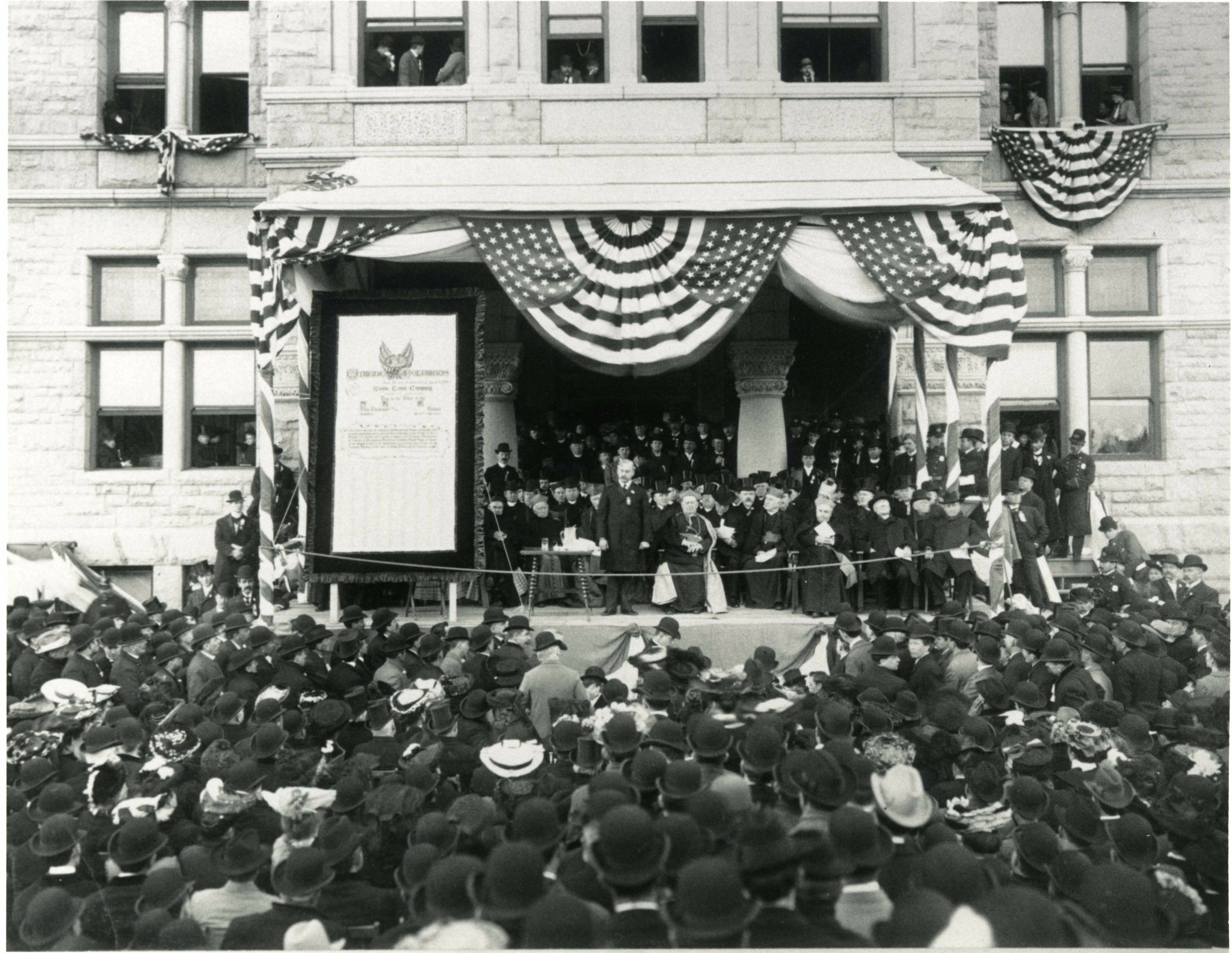
The Knights of Columbus presented a check to Catholic University of America on the steps of the university's McMahon Hall in 1904 to establish a Chair of American History.

On March 7, 1899, Vice Rector and Knight Phillip Garrigan addressed the National Council, as the Supreme Convention was called at the time, asking for establishment of a Knights of Columbus Chair of American History at the University, to counter the somewhat anti-Catholic bias of history-writing at the time. He said that "we are attacked by anti-Catholic spokesmen on every side, partly because we have no historian among us." He added that while Protestant historians "do not mean to be unfair... they cannot take Catholic facts and analyze them and give them the mainspring of the action and estimate fairly the character of the men."

Garrison told the assembled convention that his vision was for the historian who took the chair to be of such high stature that "the defamer of Catholic truth will be silenced" in his presence. He also mentioned to the Knights, the vast majority of whom were either born in Ireland or were of Irish descent, that the Ancient Order of Hibernians had recently donated $50,000 to establish a chair in Celtic Language and Literature.

The convention enthusiastically accepted the proposal. By March 5, 1901, Supreme Knight Edward L. Hearn reported unhappily to the national convention that only $10,000 has been collected of the $50,000 commitment made two years earlier. It would take an additional three years to collect the total amount.

Over 10,000 Knights were on hand on April 13, 1904, to present a $55,633.79 check ($1,858,710.73 in 2022 dollars) to endow the Knights of Columbus Chair of American History to Cardinal James Gibbons, Chancellor of the University and a strong supporter of the Knights. The outdoor ceremony was held on the steps of the University's McMahon Hall. The gigantic check was ten feet high and four feet wide, and was beautifully executed on vellum in the style of an illuminated manuscript. It was later hang in the dining hall of the University Center West through the end of the century, and then in the newly renovated McGivney Hall after that.

Supreme Knight Hearn, who viewed the Order as a sort of Catholic anti-defamation league, said at the presentation that "non-Catholic historians... find no room in their histories to laud the magnificent work done in the early days of the nation by the Catholic missionaries and Catholic pioneers... These are the evils we seek to remedy by founding this Chair of American History."

The check represented "the Order's first response to a call from the American Church," which demonstrated to any doubters, and the early Knights did encounter opposition within the Church, that the Order was thoroughly Catholic. A number of bishops were on hand for the presentation as well, which was the first time the American hierarchy gave such an ovation to the Order. The establishment of the Knights of Columbus Chair inaugurated the department of history of the University, but it was another five years before the new history program added other fields, with undergraduate courses in "general history" in 1909, and medieval history in 1914.

The first occupant of the chair was Dr. Charles Hallan McCarthy. McCarthy, who studied at the University of Pennsylvania, was teaching in a high school and was not a Knight, and thus was a controversial selection. Some thought the position should go to John H. Ewing, a professor at the University of Notre Dame and the first state deputy of Indiana. McCarthy performed admiralty in the position however, and directed several graduate students who went on to great things, including Matthew J. Walsh.

=== Scholarships ===
In December 1904, Cardinal Gibbons appealed to the Knights for more financial aid to help meet operating costs after some investments went sour, and the Order gave nearly $25,000. In his letter, he referred to the Knights' "princely munificence" and added that "I know that your bounty is limited only by your means."

By 1907 the financial situation of Catholic University had improved but was still shaky. Archbishop John J. Glennon of St. Louis, chairman of a committee to plan for a $500,000 endowment, appealed to the Knights as the committee believed the Order was the only organization which could raise such a large sum. On August 8 he addressed the national convention in Norfolk, urging the Order to "fuse the activities of your Society into one grand movement that would stand out at the head of all Catholic National and Charitable movements in the United States." He added that doing so would "give you the position your friends believe you are entitled to, namely the leading Catholic Society of the leading Catholic people of the United States."

Hearn did not endorse the proposal, and by at least one account seemed cool to the idea, but left it to the "serious and careful thoughts of the delegates." The National Council accepted the idea in principle, although several proposals to raise the funds could not find enough support to pass. Eventually, Hearn was instructed to appoint a committee to settle the matter.

After some delay, a committee was assembled in January 1908 and finally in December devised a plan that won the support of the Board of Directors in April 1909. Every Knight was mailed a letter and was asked to voluntarily contribute $1 a year for a five-year period. On December 6, 1913, the goal was realized.

At Cardinal Gibbons's residence in Baltimore on January 6, 1914, a party headed by new Supreme Knight James A. Flaherty presented $500,000 in securities, the results of the fund drive for Catholic University. The University and the Order agreed that rather than an endowment as originally planned, the funds would be used to establish fellowships for M.A. or Ph.D. studies with the hope of producing teachers for both Catholic and secular colleges and universities. Originally there was to be one fellowship for every $10,000, with preference going to Knights or their families.

By 1922, 146 K. of C. Fellowships had been awarded. In later years the funds permitted far fewer fellowships, which, in the words of the University's centennial history in 1990 "have remained the most attractive fellowships under the control of the university despite drastic reductions in their number due to the effects of inflation upon university charges for tuition, board, and room."

The fellowships established by the Order, and the active interest shown by some members of the faculty in the Knights, made the University a good place to look for members. In February 1925, Washington Council arranged for a smoker at the University for faculty and students. As a result, a Knights of Columbus Club was organized which in turn resulted in the initiation of about fifty students into the Council annually during the next few years. Some became officers.

=== Sun Bowl ===
After the 1940 Sun Bowl, Knights of Columbus in El Paso took the Cardinal football players over the border for lunch in the "squalid but colorful Mexican town" of Ciudad Juárez.

== Columbus School of Law ==
With the success of its vocational courses in camps to prepare World War I veterans for civilian life, the Supreme Council established an Education Committee in June 1919. This Committee later established a national tuition-free evening school program for veterans. By November, when the War Department took over the camp vocational courses from volunteer agencies, the Knights had nearly seven thousand students in twenty-five camps. Washington Council Grand Knight Frank O'Hara, head of the economics department at the University, taught with other Knights teach in the Washington program, which focused on high school subjects. He later become dean of the school, and liberal arts and professional courses were added.

In 1921 Catholic University "affiliated" with the Knights of Columbus evening school for its college courses, and three years later also recognized its secondary school courses. This allowed "a large group of Catholic students who otherwise would go elsewhere to continue their studies" to instead attend CUA, as the annual report of the rector stated. The school was located at St. John's College on Vermont Avenue, with 1,500 students registered, and a faculty of 24, of whom twenty were from the CUA. A committee of University trustees saw it as "practically under University control, though not officially so."

The evening school had developed into Columbus University and obtained a charter in 1922. It was reported that the Order's Board of Directors was disassociating itself from the institution. Though there was appreciation among ecclesiastical officials of the service provided to those who couldn't regularly attend a university, there was also concern in Catholic University administration about the confusion that could result from the close relationship between CUA and Columbus University. During this time there was a lessening of the role of the CUA teachers. O'Hara resigned as president of Columbus University and from its board, though he continued to teach, and there was a reduction of the course offerings to accounting and law. Sometime in the years 1923–25, the five councils of Washington D.C. voted on whether to keep the school open, with three favoring and two against.

Three decades later, in 1954, Columbus University would merge with the law program of CUA to become the Columbus School of Law at Catholic University of America after the American Bar Association in 1951 challenged law schools not affiliated with a university. The CUA law school was the first professional school of the University, and occupied the remodeled downtown building of the former Columbus University for over two decades, until 1966, when it moved to a new building on the campus.

== Buildings ==
The chairman of the committee that handled the fund-raising for the 1914 fellowships, Edward H. Doyle, expressed at the time of the presentation the hope that the Order would donate another $100,000 to pay for a dormitory for the 50 fellows. The University did complete its second dormitory building just in time to house them, and it became known as Graduate Hall, but it would be renamed several times (including University Center, then Cardinal Hall) in later years and is now known as O'Connell Hall. In the 20th century this building housed the $50,000 check from 1904, and on its upper floors Catholic University Council No. 9542 held its meetings and had an office.

In 1920, the Order contributed $60,000 toward Catholic University's gymnasium and drill hall, which later became the Crough Building housing the School of Architecture. On October 1, 1994, the Columbus School of Law dedicated its new building on campus. The Knights of Columbus are listed among the seven donors of "Leadership Gifts" of $500,000 or more and a plaque in the courtyard especially honors the Knights.

At the 2006 American Cardinals Dinner, Supreme Knight Carl Anderson announced an $8,000,000 gift to the university to renovate Keane Hall and rename it McGivney Hall, after the Knights' founder, Michael J. McGivney. The building, which was vacant, now houses the Washington session of the Pontifical John Paul II Institute for Studies on Marriage and Family.

== 20th century ==
The Order participated in the Civil Rights Movement. In 1963, the Order organized and funded a large number of African Americans who traveled to Washington DC for the March on Washington. Because they were unable to find hotels or other housing accommodations in the city, they stayed in the University's gymnasium.

A $1,000,000 trust was established in August 1965 to fund the Pro Deo and Pro Patria Scholarship, providing twelve undergraduate scholarships annually to sons and daughters of Knights who earned the highest scores on a competitive examination.

On April 7, 1988, Catholic University Council No. 9542 presented a special plaque to new Supreme Chaplain, Bishop Thomas V. Daily, a member of the University's Board, in a gala event attended by the Supreme Knight and Knights from DC and the neighboring jurisdictions. The 10-foot-high check the Knights gave the University in 1904 was temporarily moved from its permanent location and set up in the Caldwell Hall where the event took place, to be seen by most present for the first time.

The North American Campus of the Pope John Paul II Institute on Marriage and the Family, funded by the Knights and established at the Dominican House of Studies, adjacent to the CUA campus, opens its first academic year on September 8, 1988. At the 1989 Supreme Convention in Baltimore, the Order voted a $2,000,000 birthday gift to the U.S. bishops on their bicentennial, to be given to Catholic University and used to fund special projects jointly chosen by the University and the Order. Proceeds from this fund helped to finance the construction of the Columbus School of Law building.

Supreme Knight Luke E. Hart was granted a Doctor of Laws degree in 1957, and Supreme Knight John W. McDevitt was awarded a Doctor of Humane Letters in 1967.

== 21st century ==
In 2008, Carl Anderson and his wife, Dorian, were awarded honorary Doctor of Theology degrees. Their daughter had graduated from the university several years before. Anderson and his immediate predecessor, Virgil Dechant, had both served on the CUA board. Anderson's successor, Patrick E. Kelly, serves on the board as of 2025.

In 2010s, the Knights made a gift of $158,400 to the University to establish the Pope Benedict XVI Chair in Theology. An additional gift of $328,600 in 2015 was for the support of educational conferences and the Benedict XVI "chair in theology fund."

At the 143rd annual Supreme Convention, which was held in Washington D.C., Rev. Frank S. Donio was awarded the McGivney Medal, the highest honor given annually to a Knights of Columbus chaplain. Donio was a charter member of the CUA Council when he was a student at the university, and as of the time of his award in 2025 he had served as the council chaplain for over 20 years. Donio also served as the DC state chaplain and the chaplain of his 4th degree assembly.

== Sources ==
- Kauffman, Christopher J. (1982). Faith and Fraternalism. Harper and Row. ISBN 978-0-06-014940-6.
