= Supreme Knight of the Knights of Columbus =

Head of the Knights of Columbus

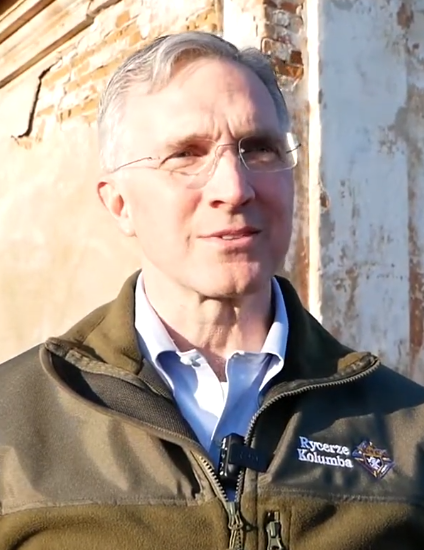
- Incumbent; Patrick E. Kelly since March 1, 2021
- Style: Supreme Knight
- Status: Chief executive officer; Chairman of the board
- Abbreviation: SK
- Member of: Knights of Columbus
- Residence: United States
- Term length: At their discretion; mandatory retirement at age 70
- Formation: February 2, 1882; 144 years ago
- First holder: James T. Mullen
- Website: kofc.org/en/who-we-are/our-supreme-officers/supreme-knight.html

The supreme knight of the Knights of Columbus (more simply referred to as the supreme knight) is the title of the chairman of the board and chief executive officer of the Knights of Columbus. The organization comprises approximately 1.9 million members in more than 15,000 councils and operates an insurance company with over $109 billion of life insurance in force, as of 2020.

Since its founding in 1882, there have been 14 supreme knights. Patrick E. Kelly is the supreme knight incumbent, holding this position since March 1, 2021.

| Supreme Knight | | | | | Deputy Supreme Knight | | Supreme Chaplain | |
| # | Office holder | Portrait | Term began | Term ended | Office holder | Term | Office holder | Term |
|---|---|---|---|---|---|---|---|---|
| 1 | James T. Mullen | | March 29, 1882 | May 17, 1886 | John T. Kerrigan | 1882–1884 | Rev. Patrick P. Lawlor | 1882–1884 |
| 1 | James T. Mullen | | March 29, 1882 | May 17, 1886 | John F. Dowling | 1884–1886 | Rev. Michael J. McGivney | 1884–1890 |
| 2 | John J. Phelan | | May 17, 1886 | March 2, 1897 | William Hassett | 1886–1887 | Rev. Michael J. McGivney | 1884–1890 |
| 2 | John J. Phelan | | May 17, 1886 | March 2, 1897 | James C. Roach | 1887–1895 | Rev. Michael J. McGivney | 1884–1890 |
| 2 | John J. Phelan | | May 17, 1886 | March 2, 1897 | James C. Roach | 1887–1895 | Rev. Hugh Treanor | 1891–1899 |
| 2 | John J. Phelan | | May 17, 1886 | March 2, 1897 | James E. Hayes | 1895–1897 | Rev. Hugh Treanor | 1891–1899 |
| 3 | James E. Hayes | | March 2, 1897 | February 8, 1898 | John J. Cone | 1897–1898 | Rev. Hugh Treanor | 1891–1899 |
| 4 | John J. Cone | | March 2, 1898 | March 31, 1899 | Vacant | | Rev. Hugh Treanor | 1891–1899 |
| 5 | Edward L. Hearn | | April 1, 1899 | August 31, 1909 | John W. Hogan | April 1, 1899–June 3, 1903 | Rev. Garrett J. Barry | 1899–1901 |
| 5 | Edward L. Hearn | | April 1, 1899 | August 31, 1909 | John W. Hogan | April 1, 1899–June 3, 1903 | Rev. Patrick J. McGivney | 1901–1928 |
| 5 | Edward L. Hearn | | April 1, 1899 | August 31, 1909 | Patrick L. McArdle | June 3, 1903–1905 | Rev. Patrick J. McGivney | 1901–1928 |
| 5 | Edward L. Hearn | | April 1, 1899 | August 31, 1909 | James A. Flaherty | 1905–1909 | Rev. Patrick J. McGivney | 1901–1928 |
| 6 | James A. Flaherty | | September 1, 1909 | August 31, 1927 | Martin H. Carmody | 1909–1927 | Rev. Patrick J. McGivney | 1901–1928 |
| 7 | Martin H. Carmody | | September 1, 1927 | August 31, 1939 | John F. Martin | 1927–1933 | Rev. Patrick J. McGivney | 1901–1928 |
| 7 | Martin H. Carmody | | September 1, 1927 | August 31, 1939 | John F. Martin | 1927–1933 | Rev. John J. McGivney | 1928–1939 |
| 7 | Martin H. Carmody | | September 1, 1927 | August 31, 1939 | Francis P. Matthews | 1933–1939 | Rev. John J. McGivney | 1928–1939 |
| 8 | Francis P. Matthews | | September 2, 1939 | October 14, 1945 | John E. Swift | 1939–1945 | Rev. Leo M. Finn | 1939–1960 |
| 9 | John E. Swift | | October 24, 1945 | August 31, 1953 | Timothy P. Galvin | 1945–1949 | Rev. Leo M. Finn | 1939–1960 |
| 9 | John E. Swift | | October 24, 1945 | August 31, 1953 | William J. Mulligan | 1949–1960 | Rev. Leo M. Finn | 1939–1960 |
| 10 | Luke E. Hart | | September 1, 1953 | February 19, 1964 | William J. Mulligan | 1949–1960 | Rev. Leo M. Finn | 1939–1960 |
| 10 | Luke E. Hart | | September 1, 1953 | February 19, 1964 | John W. McDevitt | 1960–1964 | Bishop Charles P. Greco | 1961–January 20, 1987 |
| 11 | John W. McDevitt | | February 22, 1964 | January 21, 1977 | John H. Griffin, MD | 1964–1966 | Bishop Charles P. Greco | 1961–January 20, 1987 |
| 11 | John W. McDevitt | | February 22, 1964 | January 21, 1977 | Charles J. Ducey | 1966–April 1976 | Bishop Charles P. Greco | 1961–January 20, 1987 |
| 11 | John W. McDevitt | | February 22, 1964 | January 21, 1977 | Ernest J. Wolff | 1976–1977 | Bishop Charles P. Greco | 1961–January 20, 1987 |
| 12 | Virgil C. Dechant | | January 21, 1977 | September 30, 2000 | Frederick H. Pelletier | 1977–1981 | Bishop Charles P. Greco | 1961–January 20, 1987 |
| 12 | Virgil C. Dechant | | January 21, 1977 | September 30, 2000 | John M. Murphy | 1981–1984 | Bishop Charles P. Greco | 1961–January 20, 1987 |
| 12 | Virgil C. Dechant | | January 21, 1977 | September 30, 2000 | Ellis D. Flinn | 1984–February 1, 1997 | Bishop Charles P. Greco | 1961–January 20, 1987 |
| 12 | Virgil C. Dechant | | January 21, 1977 | September 30, 2000 | Ellis D. Flinn | 1984–February 1, 1997 | Bishop Thomas V. Daily | February 13, 1987–April 1, 2005 |
| 12 | Virgil C. Dechant | | January 21, 1977 | September 30, 2000 | Robert F. Wade | April 1, 1997–September 30, 2000 | Bishop Thomas V. Daily | February 13, 1987–April 1, 2005 |
| 13 | Carl A. Anderson | | October 1, 2000 | February 28, 2021 | Jean B. Migneault | October 1, 2000–October 27, 2006 | Bishop Thomas V. Daily | February 13, 1987–April 1, 2005 |
| 13 | Carl A. Anderson | | October 1, 2000 | February 28, 2021 | Jean B. Migneault | October 1, 2000–October 27, 2006 | Archbishop William E. Lori | April 2, 2005–present |
| 13 | Carl A. Anderson | | October 1, 2000 | February 28, 2021 | Dennis A. Savoie | October 27, 2006–December 2013 | Archbishop William E. Lori | April 2, 2005–present |
| 13 | Carl A. Anderson | | October 1, 2000 | February 28, 2021 | Logan T. Ludwig | December 12, 2013–December 16, 2016 | Archbishop William E. Lori | April 2, 2005–present |
| 13 | Carl A. Anderson | | October 1, 2000 | February 28, 2021 | Patrick E. Kelly | January 1, 2017–February 28, 2021 | Archbishop William E. Lori | April 2, 2005–present |
| 14 | Patrick E. Kelly | | March 1, 2021 | present | Paul O'Sullivan | June 9, 2021–July 1, 2023 | Archbishop William E. Lori | April 2, 2005–present |
| 14 | Patrick E. Kelly | | March 1, 2021 | present | Arthur L. Peters | July 1, 2023-present | Archbishop William E. Lori | April 2, 2005–present |

== Bibliography ==
- Dodge, William Wallace (1903). The Fraternal and Modern Banquet Orator: An Original Book of Useful Helps at the Social Session and Assembly of Fraternal Orders, College Entertainments, Social Gatherings and All Banquet Occasions. Chicago: Monarch Book Company.
- Kauffman, Christopher J. (1982). Faith and Fraternalism: The History of the Knights of Columbus, 1882–1982. Harper and Row. ISBN 978-0-06-014940-6.
