= Patronal Medal =

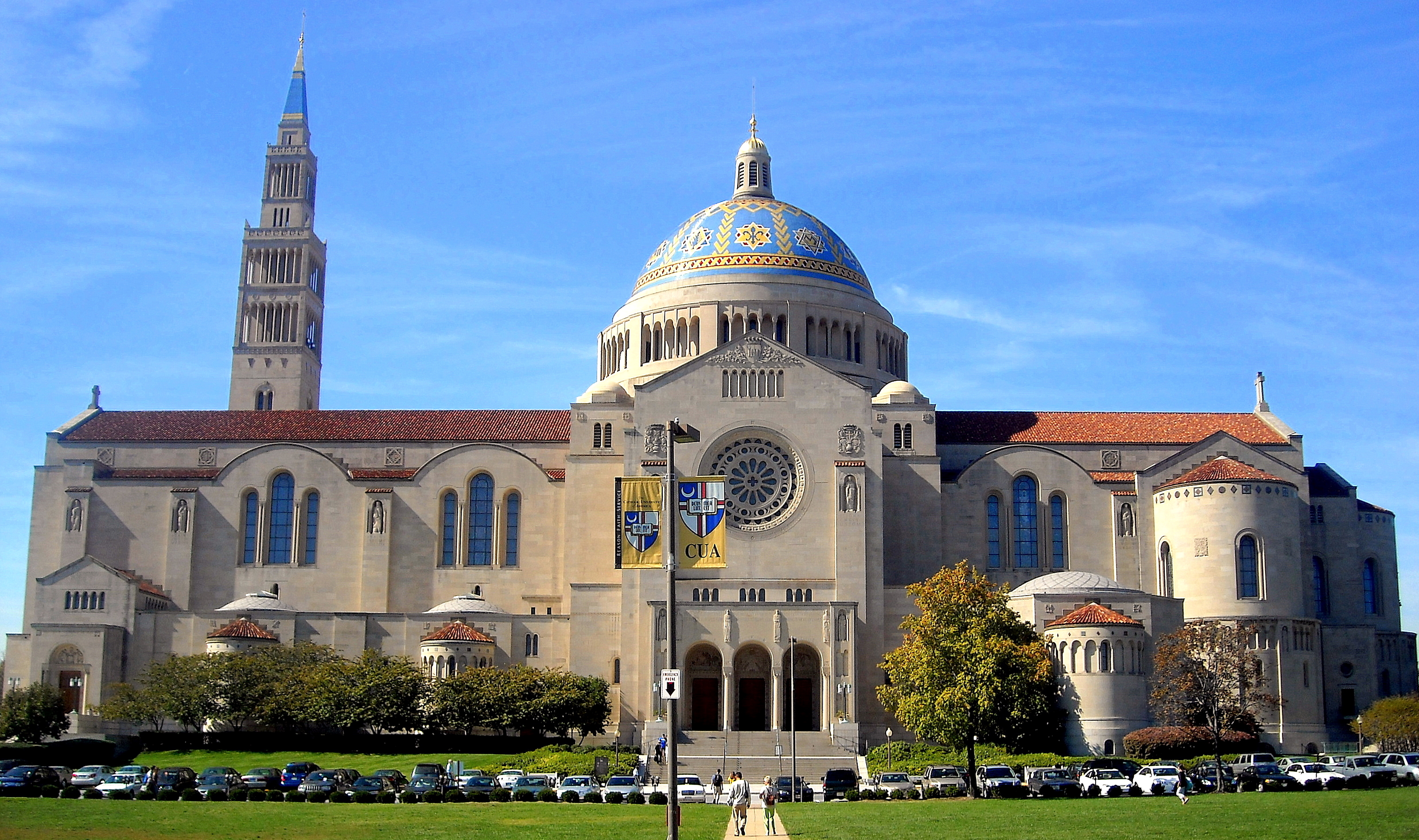
- View of the east side of the Basilica of the National Shrine of the Immaculate Conception
- Awarded for: Distinguished service in the advancement of Marian devotion
- Sponsored by: The Catholic University of America and the Basilica of the National Shrine of the Immaculate Conception
- Location: Washington, DC
- Country: USA
- Reward: Medal
- First award: 1974
- Final award: 2016

The Patronal Medal is awarded jointly by The Catholic University of America and the Basilica of the National Shrine of the Immaculate Conception. It is awarded someone who has "rendered distinguished service in the advancement of Marian devotion, theology, or general appreciation of the place of Mary in the life of the Catholic Church."

It is awarded on an occasional basis around December 8, the Feast of the Immaculate Conception, the Patronal feast of Catholic University and the Basilica. It was awarded 25 times between its establishment in 1974 and 2010.

== Winners ==
Year	Winner	Position	Citation
2016	Sandra Andreas McMurtrie	Catholic volunteer	
2016	Robert F. Comstock	Attorney	
2013	Carl A. Anderson	Supreme Knight of the Knights of Columbus	"He embodies the qualities for which the Patronal Medal is awarded because his strong faith and devotion to Mary underpin all that he does."
2009	Msgr. Paul Lenz	Vice-postulator of the cause for canonization of Saint Kateri Tekakwitha	"With great admiration and affection for him and in recognition of his life's work, the Basilica of the National Shrine of the Immaculate Conception and The Catholic University of America together, this day, proudly confer upon Reverend Monsignor Paul A. Lenz their highest honor, the Patronal Medal."
1998	Cardinal Edmund Szoka	President of the Pontifical Commission for Vatican City State and of the Governatorate of Vatican City State	
1995	Joseph and Bertha Braddock		
1990	Mother Angelica	Founder of the Eternal Word Television Network	
1989	Rev. Eamon R. Carroll	Past president of the Catholic Theological Society of America and the Mariological Society of America	
1987	Thomas J. Grady	Bishop of Orlando	
1986	Cardinal John Krol	Archbishop of Philadelphia	
1985	Joseph A. Fitzmyer, S.J.	Professor at The Catholic University of America	
1984	Cardinal William Baum	Former Archbishop of Washington, Prefect of the Congregation for Catholic Education and Major Penitentiary;	
1979	Saint Teresa of Calcutta	Founder of the Missionaries of Charity	
1974	Archbishop Fulton Sheen	Bishop of Rochester	
	Michael J. Bransfield	Bishop of Wheeling-Charleston and former rector of the Basilica	
	Cardinal John Carberry	Archbishop of St. Louis	
	Virgil Dechant	Supreme Knight of the Knights of Columbus	
	Cardinal James Hickey	Archbishop of Washington	
	Dolores Hope	Wife of entertainer Bob Hope	
	Fr. Frederick Jelly	President of the Mariologist Society of America and the Ecumenical Society of the Blessed Virgin Mary	
	Bishop James T. McHugh	Bishop of Rockville Centre	
	Cardinal Patrick O'Boyle	Archbishop of Washington	
	Fr. Patrick Peyton	Founder of the Family Rosary Crusade	

== See also ==
- List of religion-related awards
- List of ecclesiastical decorations
