= Timothy Galvin =

14th Deputy Supreme Knight of the Knights of Columbus

- Born: August 7, 1894; Pierceton, Indiana
- Died: January 27, 1993 (aged 98)
- Years active: 1945-1949
- Title: 14th Deputy Supreme Knight of the Knights of Columbus
- Predecessor: John E. Swift
- Successor: William J. Mulligan
- Spouse: Mary Graziella Chevigny
- Children: 3

Timothy Patrick Galvin (August 7, 1894 – January 27, 1993) was a lawyer and Deputy Supreme Knight of the Knights of Columbus.

== Personal life ==
Galvin was born in Pierceton, Indiana on August 7, 1894. He later settled in Hammond, Indiana after beginning his law career. He enlisted in the United States Army on March 2, 1918, and became a ordnance sergeant. During World War I, after serving as a Knights of Columbus secretary at Camp Greene in North Carolina, he joined the American Expeditionary Forces in July 1918, and returned a year later.

Galvin married Mary Graziella Chevigny, who predeceased him in 1947, and together they had a daughter and two sons, Mary Anne, Timothy P. Jr., and Patrick Joseph. Both sons attended Notre Dame. He had a brother, Francis Joseph Galvin Sr., with whom he had a law practice, another brother, Edward, and two sisters, Nell and Catherine.

== Early career ==
=== Notre Dame ===
Galvin was a member of the Class of 1916 at the University of Notre Dame. As a student, he was an editor of the Notre Dame Dome and was on the debate team.

In the 1930s, Galvin was president of the Notre Dame Alumni Association. Beginning in 1946, he served as a university lay trustee.

=== Career ===
Galvin began his law career in the office of the Daniel E. Celly in Valparaiso in September 1916 before moving his practice to Hammond in 1923. There he was a partner in the firm of Tinkam and Galvin. He was a senior partner at the law firm of Galvin, Galvin and Leeney (established 1934) with his brother, Francis, and Edmond J. Leeney. Prior to this, he was a member of the firm of Tinkham & Galvin. As an attorney, Galvin was admitted to the Supreme Court of the United States bar on November 18, 1943.

Galvin was a president of the Hammond Chamber of Commerce, a director of the Mercantile National Bank of Hammond, and of the Citizens Federal Savings and Loan Association of Hammond.

== Later career ==
=== Knights of Columbus ===
He joined the Knights when he turned 18, and became grand knight of Valparaiso Council before becoming a district deputy in the area. Galvin was state deputy of Indiana from 1925 to 1928. Galvin was first elected to the Supreme Board in 1933 and served as Supreme Master of the Fourth Degree of the Knights from 1941 to 1945. In 1945 he was elected Deputy Supreme Knight and resigned from that post and from the Board of Directors in 1949.

Galvin was elected Deputy Supreme Knight during a power struggle for control of the Order between his close personal friend and future Supreme Knight, Luke E. Hart, and the then-Supreme Knight, Francis P. Matthews. Over several years, Supreme Advocate Hart had orchestrated the election of directors who had a different vision for the future of the Order than Matthews.

Matthews opposed having a convention in 1945 to preserve hotel space for returning WWII soldiers, but a convention was called anyway in the expectation that something could be worked out. The convention assembled in Montreal but, upon determining that a convention there would not be feasible, they adjourned to Plattsburgh, New York. Matthews felt such an action was illegal, declared himself not a candidate, and Hart's slate of officers were all elected, including Galvin and Supreme Knight John E. Swift.

In recognition of his service to the church, he was made a Knight of the Pontifical Equestrian Order of St. Gregory the Great, one of the five Orders of Knighthood of the Holy See, by Pope Pius XII in 1942. The Timothy P. Galvin K.S.G. Outstanding Catholic Layman Award is awarded each year by the Indiana State Council in his honor.

As Deputy Supreme Knight during World War II, he argued that the United States was "fighting to uphold the doctrine at all men are created equal in the sight of God."

== Volunteer work ==
Galvin also served on the board of the Gibault School for Boys, an institution established by the Indiana Knights, for several decades, and as a trustee of Our Sunday Visitor. He was also on the Lay Advisory Board of St. Joseph's College, Calumet Center, and served as a Trustee of All Saints Parish, Hammond.

Galvin was the first commander of the Charles Pratt Post of the American Legion in Valparaiso. During the Second World War, Galvin was a member of Lake County's Selective Service Board No. 4. He also was a member of the Benevolent and Protective Order of Elks was active with the American Legion.

In 1957, B'nai B'rith of Hammond honored Galvin as the outstanding citizen of that city.
