= Joseph Flaherty =

Joseph Flaherty may refer to:

- Joseph A. Flaherty Jr. (1930–2018), American inventor and vice president at CBS
- Joseph A. Flaherty (1916–1993), American priest and president of Villanova University
- Joe Flaherty (1941–2024), American actor

== See also ==
- Joe Flaherty (politician) (born 1969/1970), Irish politician
