= John Paul II Institute =

Catholic research institute at the Catholic University of America, U.S.

Pontifical John Paul II Institute for Studies on Marriage and Family
- Latin: Pontificium Institutum Joannes Paulus II Studiorum Matrimonii ac Familiae Vashintoniae
- Type: Private, Pontifical, Graduate School
- Established: 1988
- Affiliations: Catholic Church
- Chancellor: Cardinal Baldassare Reina
- President: Rev. Msgr. Philippe Bordeyne
- Vice-president: Rev. Antonio López F.S.C.B.
- Vice-Chancellor: Wilton Cardinal Gregory
- Provost: Rev. Antonio López F.S.C.B.
- Academic staff: 23
- Location: Washington, D.C.
- Campus: Urban
- Website: http://www.johnpaulii.edu

The Pontifical John Paul II Institute for Studies on Marriage and Family is a Catholic research institution located at the Catholic University of America in Washington, D.C. The school offers graduate-level theology degrees, Continuing education programs, and graduate courses in theology and philosophy. The institute is devoted to the study of the truth about the human person in all of its dimensions: theological, philosophical, anthropological, and cosmological-scientific. The institute views that it centers its study of the person in the community that is the original cell of human society: marriage and family.

== History ==
At the conclusion of the 1980 Synod of Bishops devoted to the family, the Synod Fathers called for the creation of theological centers devoted to the study of the Church's teaching on marriage and the family. Accordingly, Pope John Paul II responded to the Synod with the establishment of the Pontifical Institute for Studies on Marriage and Family and the Pontifical Council for the Family. The institute's establishment was to be announced at the Holy Father's Wednesday audience on May 13, 1981. Because of the attempted assassination, the institute's Apostolic Constitution, Magnum Matrimonii Sacramentum, was instead given on October 7, 1982, the Feast of Our Lady of the Rosary. On that occasion the institute was entrusted in a special way to the care of the most Blessed Virgin Mary under her title Our Lady of Fatima.

The Washington session was founded in 1988 at the request of then-Archbishop of Washington Cardinal James Hickey and Virgil C. Dechant, who was then Supreme Knight of the Knights of Columbus.

== Location ==
The institute is located in McGivney Hall on the campus of Catholic University in the Brookland section of Washington, DC. It was previously housed at the nearby Dominican House of Studies, and later at McCormick Pavilion.

== Governance ==
Despite its name and location, the institute is juridically separate from Catholic University. It falls under the authority of the Grand Chancellor and president at the Roman session of the institute, Cardinal Baldassare Reina and Monsignor Philippe Bordeyne, respectively. Locally, it is governed by a Vice-Chancellor, who is always the archbishop of Washington, and a vice-president, currently Rev. Antonio López, F.S.C.B..

== Academics ==
The Washington session offers programs leading to the pontifical degrees of Doctor and Licentiate of Sacred Theology with special emphasis in marriage and family studies. It also confers the degrees of Ph.D. in Theology and Master of Theological Studies, both also specialized in marriage and family.

In 2007, the institute began offering an additional track for the M.T.S. degree focusing on biotechnology and ethics.

== Nature and Purpose ==
Cultural issues are central for the work of the institute. The institute considers the study of culture, in particular the culture of modernity as developed in America, to be an integral part of the clarification of fundamental theological concepts. The institute engages this cultural study in light of the history of the Church and Christian thought, with special attention to the writings of the Second Vatican Council and Pope John Paul II.

The aim of such study is to generate a “culture of life”: a culture whose members “see life in its deeper meaning, its beauty and its invitation to freedom and responsibility”; “who do not presume to take possession of reality, but instead accept it as a gift, discovering in all things the reflection of the Creator and seeing in every person his living image” (Evangelium vitae, 83).

== Publishing ==
The institute is home to the North American edition of the theological journal Communio. The institute's former dean and provost, David L. Schindler (1943-2022), served as editor-in-chief of the journal, and many other faculty members serve on its editorial board and are frequent contributors.

The faculty also joined that of the worldwide Institute to contribute to a 2006 collection of essays entitled The Way of Love reflecting on Pope Benedict XVI's first encyclical, Deus caritas est.

== Notable alumni ==
- Emilio Biosca Agüero
- John S. Bonnici
- Patrick E. Kelly
- D. C. Schindler
- Christopher West
