= Saint John Paul II National Shrine =

National shrine in Washington, D.C.

Coordinates: 38.9377°N 77.0047°W

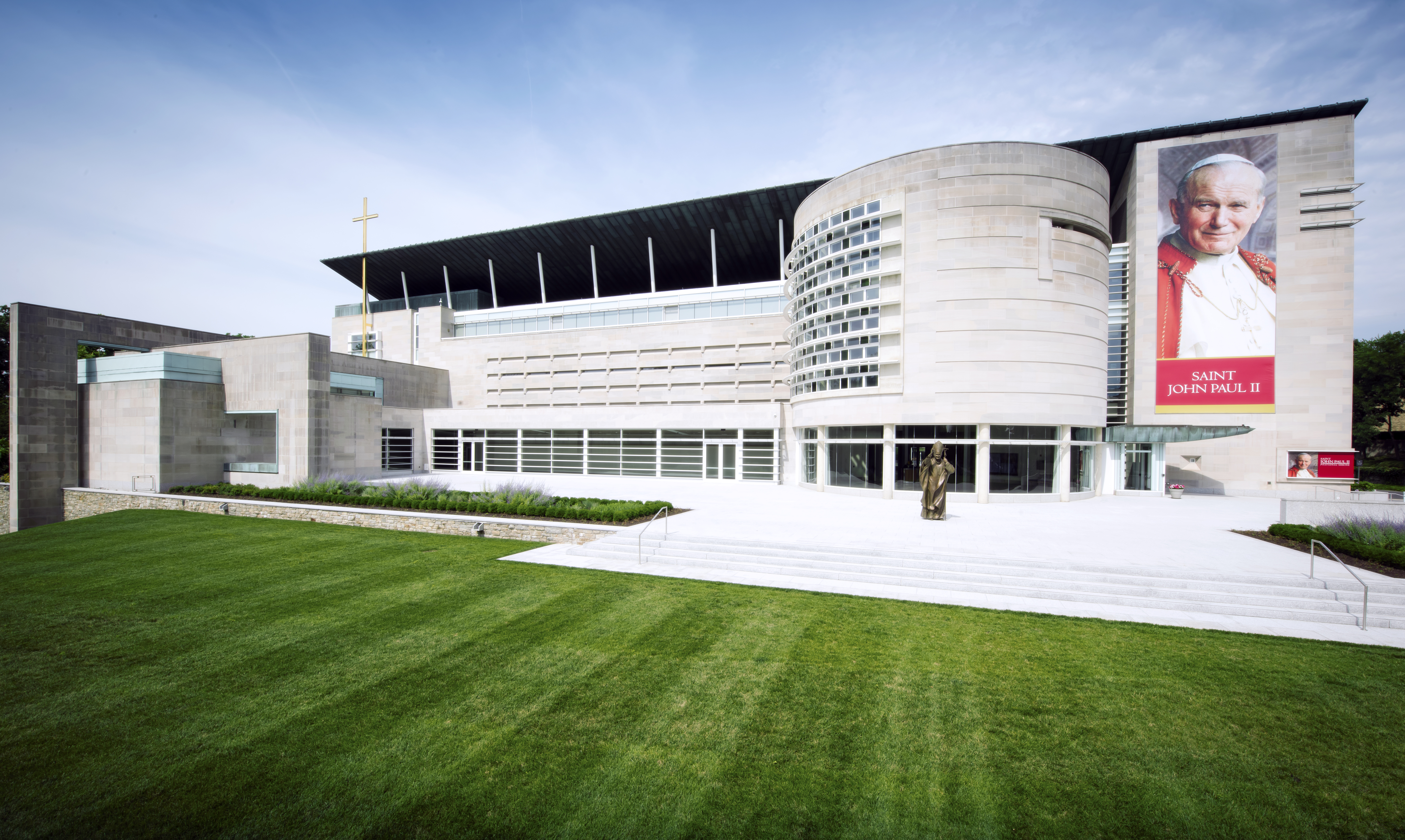
- East front of the Saint John Paul II National Shrine (2017)
- Established: 2014 (as Saint John Paul II National Shrine), 2011 (as Blessed John Paul II Shrine), 2001 (as Pope John Paul II Cultural Center)
- Location: 3900 Harewood Road NE; Washington, D.C. 20017 - 4471
- Type: Religious shrine
- Public transit access: Brookland–CUA
- Website: www.JP2Shrine.org

The Saint John Paul II National Shrine is a national shrine in Washington, D.C., sponsored by the Knights of Columbus. It is a place of prayer for Catholics and welcomes people of all faiths. The Shrine houses a permanent exhibit called A Gift of Love: the Life of Saint John Paul II and is home to the Redemptor Hominis Church and Luminous Mysteries Chapel. Mass is celebrated daily in the Redemptor Hominis Church, and the Luminous Mysteries Chapel houses a first-class relic of John Paul II.

The 130,000-square-foot (12,000 m^{2}) building is built on 12 acres (4.9 ha) adjacent to The Catholic University of America and the Basilica of the National Shrine of the Immaculate Conception in the Brookland neighborhood of Northeast Washington.

== History ==
Although they are two separate projects, the building which is now the Saint John Paul II National Shrine historically housed the Pope John Paul II Cultural Center. The idea for the center originated at a meeting in 1989 between Pope John Paul II and the then Bishop Adam Maida, the Bishop of Green Bay. Maida had proposed an institution similar to a U.S. presidential library be built in honor of the pope; the pope instead suggested a center for exploring interfaith issues. The cultural center was envisioned as a museum and Catholic think tank which would explore the intersection of faith and culture through interactive displays, academic discussion and research, and museum exhibits.

In 1990 Maida was appointed Archbishop of Detroit, and he set to work raising funds. About $50 million was raised from several thousand donors. The Archdiocese lent $17 million directly to the center and also guaranteed its $23 million mortgage. Construction of the complex cost $75 million. The center was opened to the public in a ceremony in March 2001, attended by President George W. Bush, several cardinals, members of Congress and other dignitaries.

In 2025, the Knights of Columbus purchased the Washington Retreat House, which was next door to the Shrine, making it part of the campus. The building was renamed as the Saint John Paul II Retreat House.

=== The Knights of Columbus management ===
On August 2, 2011, Carl Anderson, Supreme Knight of the Knights of Columbus, announced that the Catholic lay family organization would purchase the Cultural Center with the intention of transforming it into a religious shrine dedicated to the memory of the then Blessed John Paul II. Cardinal Donald Wuerl, the Archbishop of Washington, immediately declared the facility a diocesan shrine. The Knights paid $22.7 million, of which $2.7 million went to the Catholic University of America and $20 million to the Archdiocese of Detroit.

From the beginning of the Knights of Columbus’ sponsorship of the Shrine, Mass was celebrated on a nearly daily basis at the Shrine and a simple temporary exhibit on John Paul II was made available to the public.

Over the next five years, the Knights of Columbus undertook massive renovations to the facility including the construction of a 16,000 sq. ft. exhibit on the life and legacy of John Paul II and the development of two liturgical spaces on the main floor of the Shrine.

On April 14, 2014, the day of John Paul II’s canonization by Pope Francis, the shrine was elevated to the status of a national shrine pursuant to a vote of the Administrative Committee of the U.S. Conference of Catholic Bishops and renamed the Saint John Paul II National Shrine.

In 2022, allegations of sexual and spiritual abuse were made against Fr. Marko Rupnik. Following these allegations, there have been calls to remove Rupnik's art from the shrine. The Knights of Columbus responded to these calls stating, "We are carefully considering the best course of action concerning the art that was installed by the Centro Aletti community here at the shrine." In July 2024 it was announced that Rupnik's mosaics would be covered in the two chapels at the shrine, but a final decision about the fate of Rupnik's art is yet to come.
