= Dolores Hope =

American singer, entertainer and philanthropist (1909–2011)

Dolores Hope DC*SG
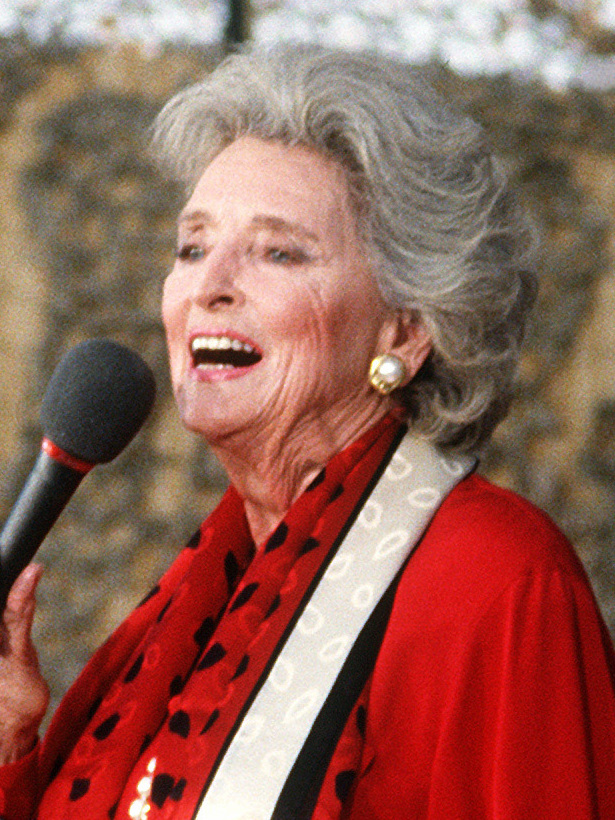
- Hope in 1990
- Born: Dolores L. DeFina; May 27, 1909; New York City, U.S.
- Died: September 19, 2011 (aged 102); Los Angeles, California, U.S.
- Resting place: Bob Hope Memorial Garden, Mission San Fernando Rey de España
- Other name: Dolores Reade
- Occupations: Singer, philanthropist
- Years active: 1929–2011
- Spouse: Bob Hope (m. 1934; died 2003)
- Children: 4

Dolores Hope, DC*SG (née DeFina; May 27, 1909 – September 19, 2011) was an American singer, entertainer and philanthropist, who was the wife of American actor and comedian Bob Hope.

== Early life and career ==
Dolores L. DeFina was born on May 27, 1909, in Manhattan's Harlem neighborhood of Italian and Irish descent, and was raised in the Bronx. After the death of her bartender father, Jack DeFina, in 1925, her younger sister Mildred (1911–2014) and she were raised in the Bronx by their mother, Theresa DeFina (1890–1977), who worked as a saleslady in a drygoods store.

During the 1930s, after working as a model, DeFina began her professional singing career, adopting the name Dolores Reade on the advice of her agent. On October 26, 1933, she appeared as vocalist on two Joe Venuti and His Orchestra recordings of 'Heat Wave" and "Easter Parade". (It was issued on Banner 32879, Melotone M-12828, Canadian Melotone 91649, Oriole 2783, Perfect 15838, Romeo 2156, and "Heat Wave" was also issued on British Decca F-5202.)

In 1933, after appearing at the Vogue Club, a Manhattan nightclub, Reade was introduced to Bob Hope. The couple reportedly were married on February 19, 1934, in Erie, Pennsylvania. They later adopted four children from The Cradle in Evanston, Illinois: Eleanora, Linda, William (Kelly), and Anthony (d. 2004). "She was a woman of her words and a fine singer. Bob and Dolores were the talk of many people back in those holy days," says a friend, Malory Thorn. Bob and she celebrated their birthdays on May 28 every year—splitting the difference between their respective real birthdays.

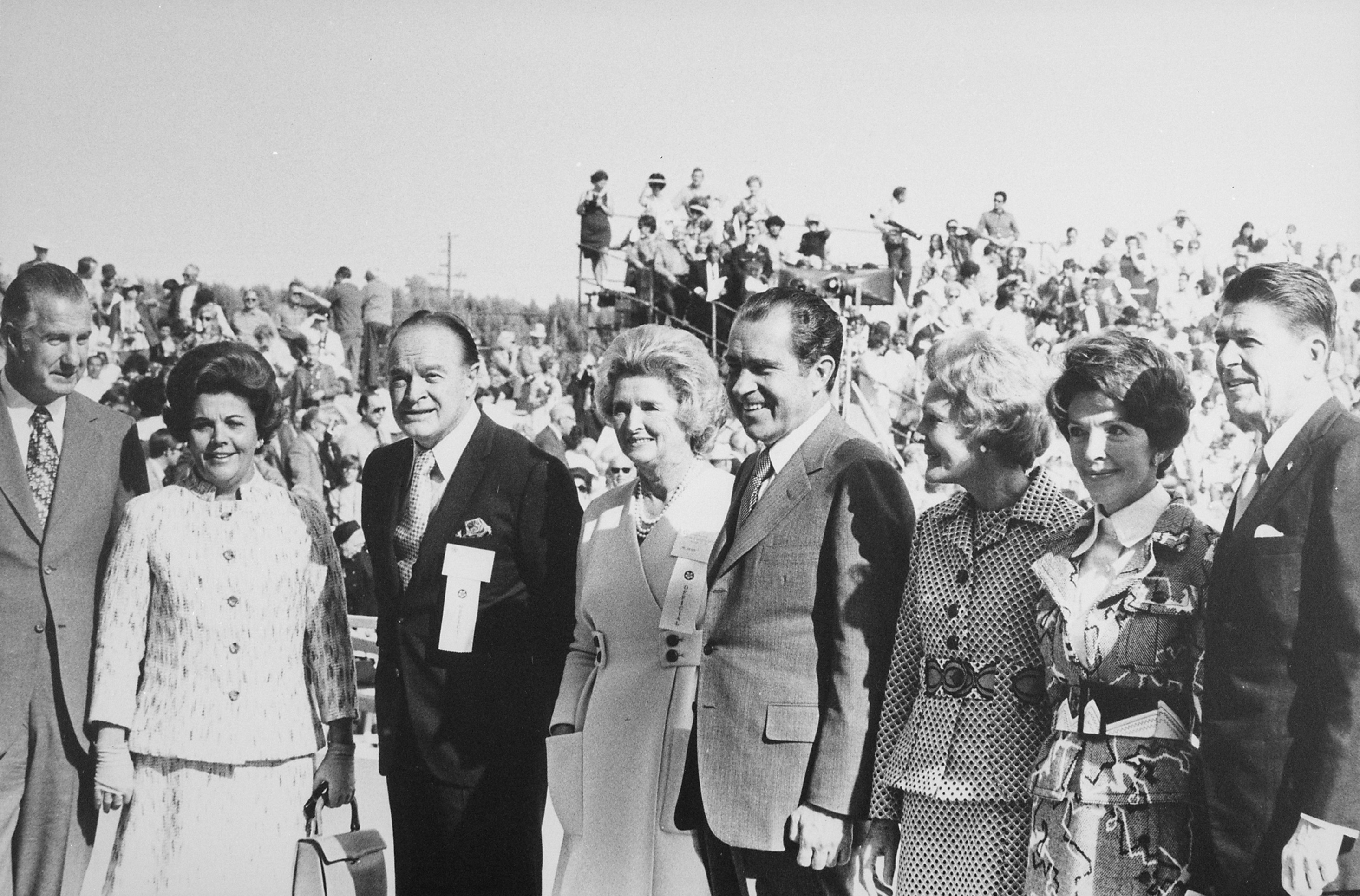
From left to right: Spiro and Judy Agnew, Bob and Dolores Hope, Richard and Pat Nixon, Nancy and Ronald Reagan during a campaign stop for the Nixon-Agnew ticket in California, 1971

In the 1940s, Dolores began helping her husband on his tours entertaining US troops overseas, and she continued to do so for over 50 years. In 1990, she was the only female entertainer allowed to perform in Saudi Arabia.

At age 83, she recorded her first Compact Disc, Dolores Hope: Now and Then. She followed this with three additional albums and also recorded a Christmas CD with Bob titled Hopes for the Holidays.

== Later years ==
Hope was an honorary board member of the humanitarian organization Wings of Hope. On May 29, 2003, Dolores was at her husband's side as he celebrated his 100th birthday; he died two months later on July 27, 2003. They had been married for 69 years, which at the time was the longest Hollywood marriage on record. The following year, Bob and Dolores' younger son, Anthony Hope, died at the age of 63. He was father to two of the Hope grandchildren, Miranda of Washington and Zachary of Santa Monica.

On October 21, 2008, at 99, she was rushed to St. Joseph's Hospital in Burbank, California, after suffering a suspected stroke. Her publicist released a statement indicating that she spent less than four hours at the hospital, where she underwent routine testing.

In 2009, Dolores Hope became a centenarian; her birthday was featured on The Today Show, with her elder son saying in an ABC interview, "I think of her as love."

On May 29, 2010, she was quoted as saying to local press, of her 101st birthday, "I'm still recovering from my 100th birthday bash, so I'm going to keep this year's celebration much quieter." On May 27, 2011, she celebrated her 102nd birthday at her California residence.

== Death ==
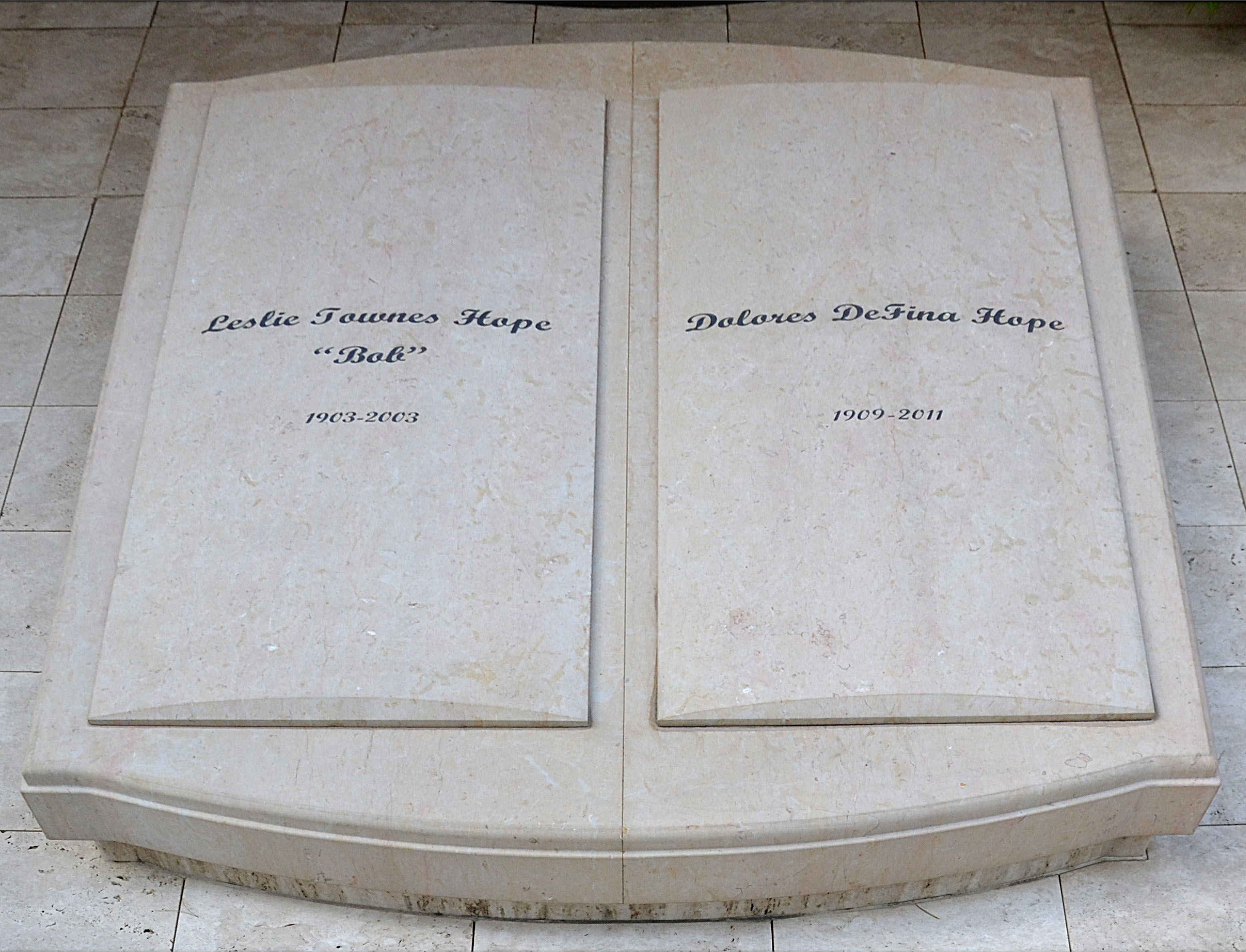
Bob and Dolores Hope's graves at the Bob Hope Memorial Garden at the San Fernando Mission

Hope died of natural causes at her home in Toluca Lake, California, on September 19, 2011, at the age of 102.

== Honors ==
Dolores received numerous honors during her lifetime.

Religious

- Dame of St. Gregory with Star (one of a very select few women named Dame of St. Gregory with Star)
- The President's Medal from Loyola College in Baltimore
- The Outstanding Catholic Laywoman Award from St. Louis University
- The Elizabeth Seton Medal Award from Seton Hill University
- Terence Cardinal Cooke Humanitarian Award from Our Lady of Mercy Medical Center
- Patronal Medal from the Basilica of the National Shrine of the Immaculate Conception and the Catholic University of America

Secular

- Hollywood Walk of Fame star for her contributions to live theatre
- A street named after her in the Bronx (her hometown)
- A permanent installation of the Tree Peony Collection bearing her name
- Chancellor Medal from the University of California, Riverside
- Winnie Palmer Humanitarian Award (from the Metropolitan Golf Writers Association)
- Patty Berg Award (2008) for contributions to women's golf
- In 1997, a Golden Palm Star on the Palm Springs, California, Walk of Stars was dedicated to her.
