= James A. Flaherty =

American lawyer (1853–1937)

James Augustine Flaherty

6th Supreme Knight of the Knights of Columbus
- In office September 1, 1909 – August 31, 1927
- Preceded by: Edward L. Hearn
- Succeeded by: Martin H. Carmody

9th Deputy Supreme Knight of the Knights of Columbus
- In office 1905 – 1909

Personal details
- Born: July 3, 1853 Philadelphia, Pennsylvania, U.S.
- Died: January 2, 1937 (aged 83) Philadelphia, Pennsylvania, U.S.
- Children: 3, including Joseph A. Flaherty
- Education: University of Pennsylvania (LLB)

James Augustine Flaherty (July 3, 1853 – January 2, 1937) was an American lawyer who served as the sixth Supreme Knight of the Knights of Columbus from September 1, 1909, to August 31, 1927.

== Early life ==
Flaherty was born on July 3, 1853, in Philadelphia, Pennsylvania, to Irish immigrants. He graduated from the University of Pennsylvania Law School in the 1870s. Flaherty practiced law for sixty-two years in Philadelphia as a lawyer specializing in settlement cases in the Orphan Court.

== Knights of Columbus ==
In 1909 Flaherty was elected Supreme Knight of the Knights of Columbus and served in the position until he retired on August 31, 1927. During his term in office, the Knights of Columbus engaged in significant work helping U.S. servicemen during World War I and civilians in the aftermath of the war. He received many honors for his work and that of the Knights, including the Croix de Guerre from the government of France. He was also awarded the Distinguished Service Medal by Secretary of War Newton D. Baker.

== Death ==
Flaherty died from pneumonia at his home on the evening of January 2, 1937. He left three children. A son, Joseph A. Flaherty O.S.A., was president of Villanova University from 1965 to 1967.

== Gallery ==
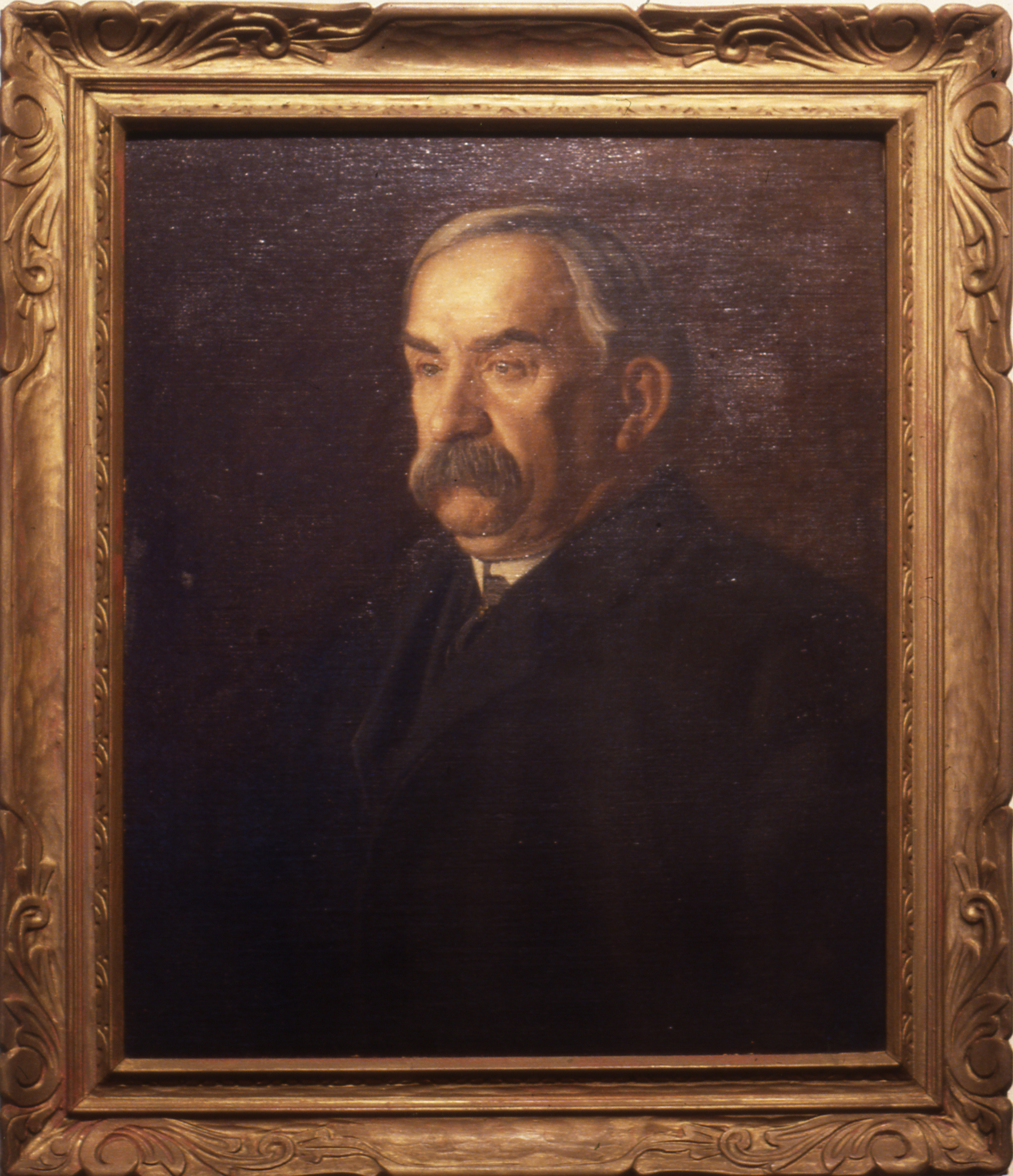
Portrait of James A. Flaherty (1903) by Thomas Eakins, St. Charles Borromeo Seminary, Philadelphia.

Religious titles
Preceded by Edward L. Hearn	Supreme Knight of the Knights of Columbus; 1909-1927	Succeeded by Martin H. Carmody
