= Martin H. Carmody =

7th Supreme Knight of the Knights of Columbus

Martin Henry Carmody
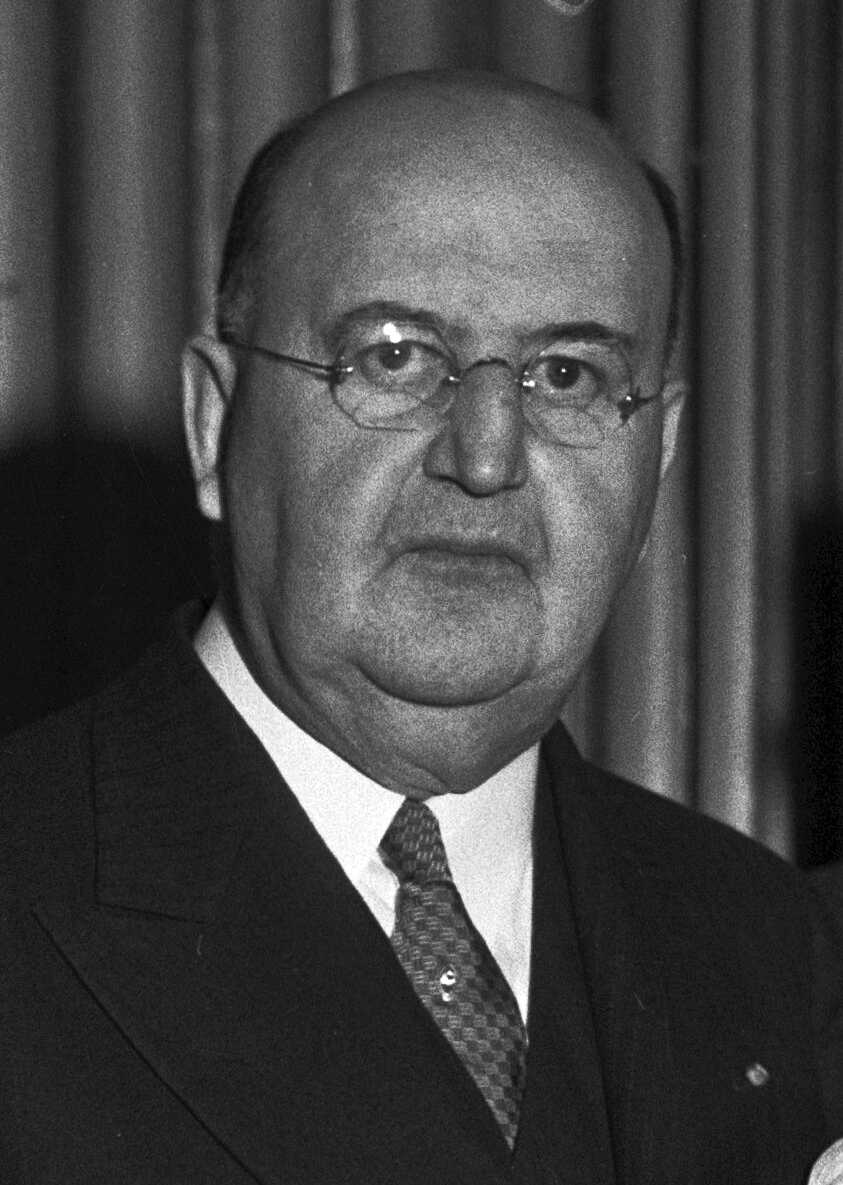

7th Supreme Knight of the Knights of Columbus
- In office September 1, 1927 – August 31, 1939
- Preceded by: James A. Flaherty
- Succeeded by: Francis P. Matthews

10th Deputy Supreme Knight of the Knights of Columbus
- In office 1909 – 1927

Personal details
- Born: January 26, 1872 Grand Rapids, Michigan, U.S.
- Died: December 9, 1950 (aged 77–78) Grand Rapids, Michigan, U.S.
- Spouse: Frances Brady (m. 1911; died 1950)
- Children: 1
- Education: University of Michigan (LLB)

Martin Henry Carmody (January 26, 1872 – December 9, 1950) was the seventh Supreme Knight of the Knights of Columbus, serving from September 1, 1927, to August 31, 1939.

== Career ==
=== Knights of Columbus ===
In 1902, Carmody joined the Knights of Columbus and later became the Grand Knight of the Grand Rapids Council as well as the District Deputy, State Deputy, and Deputy Supreme Knight of the international order for 18 years. In 1927 Carmody was elected the seventh Supreme Knight of the Knights of Columbus and was in that position until August 31, 1939. Carmody was a Chamberlain to Pope Pius XI.

For his war work during World War I he was made a chevalier of the French Legion of Honor. The rank of commander of the Order of the Star of Morocco was conferred on him by Marshal Lyautey, the French president general of Morocco. Carmody held two ranks in the Order of Saint Gregory the Great, awarded to him by Popes Benedict XV and Pius XI.

When President Herbert Hoover established the President's Organization for Unemployment Relief in 1931, Carmody wrote to Hoover pledging the services of the Order. Carmody had already encouraged the 2,600 councils to have "strong and active employment committees." By the end of July 1931, a total of 43,128 unemployed people had been placed into jobs, in addition to those placements made by local councils who were working under the auspices of other organizations. In less than two years, the Order would provide more than 100,000 jobs. In October of that year, Hoover appointed Carmody to the Organization.

== Personal life ==
Carmody was born in Grand Rapids, Michigan to Martin and Anastasia Carmody. He attended Valparaiso Normal College and graduated in 1899 from the University of Michigan Law School. While attending law school, he played football as a guard on the 1899 Michigan Wolverines football team.

Carmody married Frances Brady in Grand Rapids in 1911. On December 9, 1950, Martin Carmody died at his home, aged 78, following a long illness. He was survived by his wife, daughter and three grandchildren.

== Bibliography ==
- Kauffman, Christopher J. (1982). Faith and Fraternalism: The History of the Knights of Columbus, 1882–1982. Harper and Row. ISBN 978-0-06-014940-6.

Religious titles
Preceded by James A. Flaherty	Supreme Knight of the Knights of Columbus; 1927-1939	Succeeded by Francis P. Matthews
