= List of presidents of Villanova University =

This article contains a list of presidents of Villanova University:

1. Rev. John P. O'Dwyer, OSA (1843–1847)
2. Rev. William Harnett, OSA (1847–1848)
3. Rev. John P. O'Dwyer, OSA (1848–1850)
4. Rev. William Harnett, OSA (1850–1851)
5. Rev. Patrick E. Moriarty, OSA (1851–1855)
6. Rev. William Harnett, OSA (1855–1857)
7. Rev. Ambrose A. Mullen, OSA (1865–1869)
8. Rev. Patrick A. Stanton, OSA (1869–1872)
9. Rev. Thomas Galberry, OSA (1872–1876)
10. Rev. Thomas C. Middleton, OSA (1876–1878)
11. Rev. John J. Fedigan, OSA (1878–1880)
12. Rev. Joseph A. Coleman, OSA (1880–1886)
13. Rev. Francis M. Sheeran, OSA (1886–1890)
14. Rev. Christopher A. McEvoy, OSA (1890–1894)
15. Rev. Francis J. McShane, OSA (1894–1895)
16. Rev. Lawrence A. Delurey, OSA (1895–1910)
17. Rev. Edward G. Dohan, OSA (1910–1917)
18. Rev. James J. Dean, OSA (1917–1920)
19. Rev. Francis A. Driscoll, OSA (1920–1924)
20. Rev. Joseph A. Hickey, OSA (1924–1925)
21. Rev. Mortimer A. Sullivan, OSA (1925–1926)
22. Rev. James H. Griffin, OSA (1926–1932)
23. Rev. Edward V. Stanford, OSA (1932–1944)
24. Rev. Francis X. N. McGuire, OSA (1944–1954)
25. Rev. James A. Donnellon, OSA (1954–1959)
26. Rev. John A. Klekotka, OSA (1959–1965)
27. Rev. Joseph A. Flaherty, OSA (1965–1967)
28. Rev. Robert J. Welsh, OSA (1967–1971)
29. Rev. Edward J. McCarthy, OSA (1971–1975)
30. Rev. John M. Driscoll, OSA (1975–1988)
31. Rev. Edmund J. Dobbin, OSA (1988–2006)
32. Rev. Peter M. Donohue, OSA, PhD (2006–present)
