= John H. Griffin =

Dr. John H. Griffin (May 19, 1914 – October 18, 1988) was the Deputy Supreme Knight of the Knights of Columbus from February 1964 to October 21, 1966.

== Personal life ==
Griffin was born in the Commonwealth of Massachusetts and earned a bachelor's degree from Boston College in 1935. He earned a medical degree from Tufts University in 1939. With his wife, Mary Louise (née McDonagh), he had eight children (daughters Clare, Mary Louise, and Kathryn, and sons John, Paul, Gerald, James, Peter, and Christopher) and ten grandchildren.

He served in the United States Navy for six years, resigning with the rank of commander. Griffin died at Connecticut Hospice in Branford, Connecticut. His funeral Mass was said at St. Mary's Church in New Haven, the birthplace of the Knights.

== Knights of Columbus ==
He served as State Deputy of Maryland and was elected to the Supreme Board of Directors in 1960. From 1966 until 1984, he served as the Supreme Physician. He also served as president of the Fraternal Congress of America in 1975.
