= John W. Hogan =

American judge

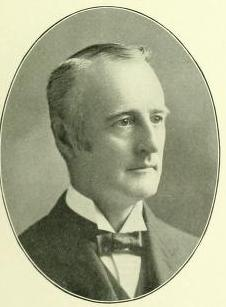
John W. Hogan (1903)

John W. Hogan (November 10, 1853 in Troy, Rensselaer County, New York – January 30, 1926 in Boston, Massachusetts) was an American lawyer and politician from New York. He also served as Deputy Supreme Knight of the Knights of Columbus.

== Life ==
In early life, he moved to Watertown, New York and began to practice law there. When Denis O'Brien, also of Watertown, was elected New York State Attorney General in 1883, Hogan went with him to Albany, New York, as his Deputy. For 12 years, Hogan served under successive administrations. In 1896, he resumed the practice of law at Syracuse, New York in the firm of Hancock, Hogan, Beach & Devine (predecessor to Hancock and Estabrook). In 1906, he became a member of the New York State Board of Charities.

In 1912, he was elected on the Democratic ticket to the New York Court of Appeals, and remained on the bench until the end of 1923 when he reached the constitutional age limit of 70 years.

He died on January 30, 1926, at the Copley Plaza Hotel in Boston, of a heart attack.

== Sources ==
- Bio at New York State Courts History
- EX-JUDGE HOGAN DIES IN BOSTON in NYT on January 31, 1926 (subscription required)
- Kauffman, Christopher J. (1982). Faith and Fraternalism. Harper and Row. ISBN 978-0-06-014940-6.
