= Joseph A. Flaherty =

The Reverend Joseph A. Flaherty, OSA

President of Villanova University
- In office 1965–1967
- Preceded by: John A. Klekotka, OSA
- Succeeded by: Robert J. Welsh, OSA

Personal details
- Born: June 13, 1916
- Died: August 8, 1993 (aged 77)
- Parent: James A. Flaherty
- Education: Saint Joseph's University (BA); Villanova University (MA); Harvard University (PhD)

Joseph A. Flaherty, O.S.A. (June 13, 1916 – August 8, 1993) was a priest of the Order of Saint Augustine and 27th president of Villanova University from 1965 to 1967. He was the son of James A. Flaherty, the sixth Supreme Knight of the Knights of Columbus.
