= William Hassett =

William Hassett was the 3rd Deputy Supreme Knight of the Knights of Columbus. He was from Wallingford, Connecticut. Previously he had served as Supreme Lecturer.

== Sources ==
- Kauffman, Christopher J. (1982). Faith and Fraternalism. Harper and Row. ISBN 978-0-06-014940-6.
