= William J. Mulligan =

15th Deputy Supreme Knight of the Knights of Columbus

William J. Mulligan was the 15th Deputy Supreme Knight of the Knights of Columbus, serving from 1949 to 1960. Previously, he was Supreme Master of the Fourth Degree from 1945 to 1949. He served under two Supreme Knights, John E. Swift and Luke E. Hart.
