= Patrick E. Kelly =

14th Supreme Knight of the Knights of Columbus

- Kelly in 2021

14th Supreme Knight of the Knights of Columbus
- Incumbent
- Assumed office March 1, 2021
- Preceded by: Carl A. Anderson

Personal details
- Born: Michigan
- Education: Marquette University; John Paul II Institute; Marquette University Law School

Patrick E. Kelly is the fourteenth and current Supreme Knight of the Knights of Columbus. He was the founding executive director of the Saint John Paul II National Shrine in Washington, D.C. In February 2021, he was elected by the board of directors to succeed Carl A. Anderson as the Supreme Knight of the Knights of Columbus. His term started on March 1, 2021, and he was formally installed on June 11, 2021.

== Early career ==
Kelly was a captain in the U.S. Navy Judge Advocate General's (JAG) Corps Reserve. He specialized in international and operational law, and retired in 2016 after 24 years of service. He also served as the Commanding Officer of the international law unit at the United States Naval War College. He serves on the Council of Advisers at the Center for the Study of Statesmanship at Catholic University.

In other roles, Kelly worked as Legislative Counsel to the Permanent Select Committee on Intelligence in the U.S. House of Representatives, and the Department of Justice. He was also the Senior Advisor to the Ambassador-at-Large for International Religious Freedom at the State Department. In this position, he was the State Department's primary contact with the Holy See and other nations on matters of religious freedom.

As of 2012, he was the chairman of the March for Life Education & Defense Fund.

== Leadership of the Knights of Columbus ==
Kelly is a Past State Deputy of the District of Columbia and was elected to the board of directors in 2013. He became Deputy Supreme Knight on January 1, 2017. In 2006 he became the Order's vice president for Public Policy, and served as the executive director of the Saint John Paul II National Shrine in Washington, D.C., which is owned and operated by the Knights, from 2011 to 2020. He has been a Knight since 1983.

Kelly was formally installed as the 14th Supreme Knight of the Knights of Columbus on June 11, 2021.

Pope Leo XIV met in person with Kelly at the Vatican in October 2025. Pope Leo thanked the Knights for funding the restoration of St. Peter's Baldachin, also saying that the Knights “seek to bring the compassion and love of the Lord into your local communities, including through your efforts to uphold the sanctity of human life in all of its stages, to assist victims of war and natural disasters, and also to support priestly vocations.”

=== Dobbs decision overturning Roe ===
In the wake of the Dobbs v. Jackson Women's Health Organization decision in 2022, Kelly said, "In a post-Roe world, the Knights will continue to be there for mothers and their children, and we will continue to proclaim the dignity of every human life.”"

Kelly also said, "Roe v. Wade is finally gone. We now have a chance to win the fight for life...by ending Roe, the court has empowered us to end one of the worst injustices in American history. Roe is overturned, but we have more work to do. We will continue to march for life until abortion is unthinkable." He added, "Each state has a choice to make. At least half will protect life to some degree. But others will keep the abortion status quo. And some states will even expand abortion, putting mothers and children in greater danger."

Kelly expressed support for a program started by the Knights in 2009 to donate ultrasound machines to pregnancy centers. The program was expanded and renamed Aid and Support After Pregnancy (ASAP) in 2022. 2,100 ultrasound machines have been installed through the end of 2025 due to the ASAP program. The national council pays half of the cost of each machine, while local chapters pay the other half. Altogether through 2025, the Knights have donated more than $22 million to more than 2,700 pregnancy centers and maternity homes.

=== Evangelization ===
In his first speech to the Knights' annual gathering after becoming its Supreme Knight, Kelly said that evangelization will be a top priority in his leadership: "When I look back on the order's history, I see evangelization in virtually everything we've done. Yet today, there is a special urgency."

Kelly launched a program called Cor in 2022, his first full year as the order's Supreme Knight. Cor is intended as a cornerstone of his evangelization efforts. According to Kelly, it is based on "prayer, formation and fraternity". The program includes a variety of elements, including a Bible study for Catholic men and a video series on "marriage, family and fatherhood".

Kelly emphasized the importance of the Knights reaching out to young men at a conference in November 2025, saying, "“Many young men are lost and disconnected. Many come from broken families with fathers who are not a real part of their life. Many are drowning in the depths of the internet and social media.”

Supporting the National Eucharistic Revival—a project of the United States Conference of Catholic Bishops launched in 2020—is one way the Knights under Kelly are supporting evangelization. Bishop Andrew Cozzens, who led the three-year Eucharistic Revival on behalf of the U.S. bishops, credited Kelly with inspiring the National Eucharistic Pilgrimage's four-route cross-country approach, instead of the single route initially envisioned.

Under Kelly's leadership, the Knights produced Mother Teresa: No Greater Love, an American documentary film about the life of Mother Teresa.

On 25 August 2026, Pope Leo XIV appointed Kelly as a member of the Dicastery for the Laity, Family and Life.

=== Membership growth ===
Membership in the Knights has increased during Supreme Knight Kelly's tenure. The organization has 2.2 million members as of 2026. It added 105,000 new members in 2025 which, according to the organization's annual report, is the largest number of new members in a year in over a century.

=== Recognition ===
Patrick Kelly accepting the Cardinal O'Connor Award from Sisters of Life, June 2026

The Path to Peace Award was conferred on Supreme Knight Kelly in May 2026 by the Path to Peace Foundation in recognition of the humanitarian work of the Knights of Columbus in countries hit by war. The award was presented by Archbishop Gabriele Giordano Caccia, the apostolic nuncio to the United States and the Holy See’s permanent observer to the U.N.

The Sisters of Life, in June 2026, gave Supreme Knight Patrick Kelly the John Cardinal O’Connor Award. These awards are presented to people who according to the order, have "made extraordinary contributions to building a culture of life".

Kelly was named an Honorary Patron of the Pope John XXIII Foundation in October 2025.

== Personal life ==
Kelly and his wife, Vanessa, are the parents of three daughters. He received a bachelor's degree in economics from Marquette University, a master's in theology from the John Paul II Institute located at The Catholic University of America, and a law degree from Marquette University Law School in 1993. Kelly grew up as one of seven siblings in Michigan.

Religious titles
Preceded by Carl A. Anderson	Supreme Knight of the Knights of Columbus; 2021–present	Incumbent
