= Logan T. Ludwig =

26th Deputy Supreme Knight of the Knights of Columbus

Logan T. Ludwig (1945 or 1946) was the 26th Deputy Supreme Knight of the Knights of Columbus from 2013 to 2016. He was first elected to the Supreme Board of Directors in 2007, and served for two years as Supreme Treasurer. Prior to joining the Supreme Council, he was state deputy of Illinois.
