= John E. Swift =

9th Supreme Knight of the Knights of Columbus

John Edward Swift

9th Supreme Knight of the Knights of Columbus
- In office October 24, 1945 – August 31, 1953
- Preceded by: Francis P. Matthews
- Succeeded by: Luke E. Hart

13th Deputy Supreme Knight of the Knights of Columbus
- In office 1939 – 1945

Personal details
- Born: December 7, 1879 Milford, Massachusetts, U.S.
- Died: August 19, 1967 (aged 87) Osterville, Massachusetts, U.S.
- Spouse: Emily Swift
- Education: Boston College (AB); Boston University (LLB)

John Edward Swift (December 7, 1879 – August 19, 1967) was an American judge who served as the ninth Supreme Knight of the Knights of Columbus from October 24, 1945, to August 31, 1953.

== Early life ==
Swift was born in Milford, Massachusetts, in 1879 to Irish immigrants. He received a bachelor's degree from Boston College in 1899 and a law degree from Boston University in 1902. As a lawyer, he worked for Senator David I. Walsh and then with his brother Thomas in private practice.

== Career ==
=== United States federal work ===
Swift was a delegate to the Democratic National Conventions in 1916 and 1920 and was admitted to the Supreme Court Bar Association in 1917. On May 17, 1933, he was appointed a Superior Court judge in Massachusetts to succeed Webster Thayer.

=== Knights of Columbus ===
Swift joined the Knights of Columbus and was a member of Valencia Council 80 in Milford. He served as grand knight, district deputy, state secretary, and finally was elected State Deputy of Massachusetts on May 10, 1927. He became a Supreme Director in 1927 and then Deputy Supreme Knight in 1939. He was elected Supreme Knight in 1945 and declined renomination in 1953.

A staunch anti-communist, his denunciations of Soviet expansion led the USSR to veto Boston as the home of the United Nations.

As Supreme Knight, he began a nationwide crusade against Communism. President Harry Truman endorsed the effort and mentioned in a letter to Swift that he hoped the entire membership "will join the crusade with zeal and enthusiasm." Truman further stated, "[O]ur goal must be to drive out of our American life every movement which aims to promote within our borders any form of totalitarianism or any subversive movement." Swift also convinced Truman to treat Spain fairly, and the Iberian country awarded him the Grand Cross of the Order of St. Raymond of Peñafort in recognition.

In 1950, after a Special Audience with Pope Pius XII, Swift instituted a fund for the purchase and construction of the last playground in Rome. Primavalle, a newly populated district, was chosen for the site. This playground was named Pius XII and dedicated and blessed by Cardinal Francis Spellman, Archbishop of New York, on June 7, 1952.

== Personal life ==
Swift was named a Massachusetts Superior Court Justice in 1947. His wife Emily died, aged 59, at their home in Milford on November 9, 1947, from a coronary thrombosis following a long illness. Swift died at his summer home in Osterville, Massachusetts, on August 19, 1967.

== Awards and honors ==
Swift was the recipient of three honorary degrees, the 1953 Catholic Action Medal, and the 1961 Lantern Award. Pope Pius XII gave him at least three honors, including Order of Cape and Sword, which was reaffirmed by Popes John XXIII and Paul VI.

Party political offices
Preceded by Michael L. Sullivan	Democratic nominee for Attorney General of Massachusetts; 1922, 1924, 1926	Succeeded by Edward P. Barry
Preceded by Strabo V. Claggett	Democratic nominee for Lieutenant Governor of Massachusetts; 1932	Succeeded by Joseph L. Hurley
Religious titles
Preceded by Francis P. Matthews	Supreme Knight of the Knights of Columbus; 1945–1953	Succeeded by Luke E. Hart
