= Carl A. Anderson =

13th Supreme Knight of the Knights of Columbus

Carl Anderson GCSG GCSS KGCHS
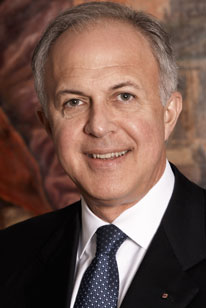
- Anderson in October 2009

13th Supreme Knight of the Knights of Columbus
- In office October 1, 2000 – February 28, 2021
- Preceded by: Virgil C. Dechant
- Succeeded by: Patrick E. Kelly

Personal details
- Born: February 27, 1951 (age 75) Torrington, Connecticut, U.S.
- Spouse: Dorian Jean Lounsbury Anderson (m. 1972)
- Children: 5
- Education: Seattle University (BPhil); University of Denver (JD)

Carl Albert Anderson GCSG GCSS KGCHS (born February 27, 1951) is an American lawyer who served as the thirteenth Supreme Knight of the Knights of Columbus from October 2000 until his retirement in February 2021.

Anderson is the vice president of the Washington session of the Pontifical John Paul II Institute for Studies on Marriage and Family. He serves as a member of the board of the Basilica of the National Shrine of the Immaculate Conception. He formerly served as a member of the Board of Trustees of The Catholic University of America and the National Catholic Educational Association.

== Education ==
Anderson holds degrees in philosophy from Seattle University (1972) and in law from the University of Denver (1975). He is a member of the bar of the District of Columbia and is admitted to practice law before the U.S. Supreme Court.

Anderson has received honorary doctorates from The Catholic University of America (his wife also received an honorary degree at the same ceremony), The Pontifical Theology Academy of Kraków, Sacred Heart University, Albertus Magnus College, Ave Maria University, St. Vincent’s Seminary, St. Charles Borromeo Seminary and Ave Maria School of Law.

== Leadership of the Knights of Columbus ==
As Supreme Knight, Anderson was the chief executive officer and chairman of the board of the world’s largest Catholic family fraternal service organization, which has more than 1.9 million members. Before his election in 2000, Anderson served as assistant supreme secretary and supreme secretary for the Knights of Columbus. Prior to that, he served for 10 years as the vice president for public policy in the Washington, D.C., office of the Knights of Columbus.

=== Support for Middle Eastern Christian refugees ===
In August 2015, Anderson announced that the Knights of Columbus had created a Christian Refugee Relief Fund to help raise money for Christians persecuted by ISIS. The Knights also led an effort to document persecution against Christians in order to establish that ISIS was perpetrating genocide, as a declaration of genocide would help secure government aid and more private donations for the persecuted communities. This effort culminated in a 278-page report released in March 2016, which prompted then-Secretary of State John Kerry to declare that atrocities committed by ISIS against Yezidis, Christians, Shiite Muslims, and other minorities constituted genocide. This declaration of genocide ultimately facilitated the unanimous passage of the Iraq and Syria Genocide Relief and Accountability Act of 2018. Rep. Chris Smith, who sponsored the bill, said that Anderson's House testimony "was the blueprint for the legislation". In addition to facilitating this legislation, the Knights donated more than $20 million in support of religious minorities in the Middle East between 2014 and 2018.

=== Ultrasound initiative ===
Under Anderson's leadership, the Knights in 2009 launched their "ultrasound initiative", with the stated goal of donating 1,000 ultrasound machines to pregnancy resource centers during the following decade. The Knights met this 10-year goal. In 2019, Anderson said "Our ultrasound initiative is now the greatest humanitarian achievement in the history of the Knights of Columbus. ... We can, and I am confident that we will, save millions of unborn lives."

=== Disaster relief ===
The Knights of Columbus provide donations and volunteer labor in response to natural disasters, such as donating wheelchairs after the 2010 Haiti earthquake and other similar disasters. In 2020, they committed $1 million in response to COVID-19, primarily in donations to food banks, as well as encouraging extra volunteer work.

== Career in public policy and academia ==
During the administration of Ronald Reagan, Anderson served in various positions of the Executive Office of the President of the United States, including special assistant to the President and acting director of the White House Office of Public Liaison.

Following his service at the White House, Anderson served for nearly a decade as a member of the U.S. Commission on Civil Rights. From 1976-81 he was a legislative assistant to Senator Jesse Helms (R-N.C.). From 1981 to 1983 he served as counselor to the Under Secretary of Health and Human Services at the U.S. Department of Health and Human Services for Secretaries Richard Schweiker and Margaret Heckler.

From 1983 to 1998 Anderson taught as a visiting professor of family law at the Pontifical John Paul II Institute for Studies on Marriage and Family located at the Pontifical Lateran University. Anderson became the founding vice president and first dean of the Washington, D.C., session of the Pontifical John Paul II Institute for Studies in Marriage and Family in 1988.

== Recognition ==
=== Pontifical honors ===
Anderson is a Knight Grand Cross of St. Gregory the Great, a Knight Grand Cross of St. Sylvester, and a Knight Grand Cross of the Holy Sepulchre.

=== Awards ===
Anderson was named one of the "100 Most Influential in Business Ethics" in 2014 and 2015 by Ethisphere. He was awarded the Order of Merit from the government of Poland and the Evangelium Vitae Medal from the University of Notre Dame in 2015. He has received the Patronal Medal of the Basilica of the National Shrine of the Immaculate Conception for his "distinguished service in the advancement of Marian devotion;" the Archdiocese of Denver's Imago Dei Award; the Becket Fund for Religious Liberty's Canterbury Medal; the Path to Peace Foundation's Servant of Peace Award; the Pontifical North American College's Rector's Award; the Sisters of Life John Cardinal O'Connor Award, the Gold Palm of the Equestrian Order of the Holy Sepulchre, and March for Life's Pro-Life Legacy Award.

=== Collaboration with the Vatican ===
In 1998, Pope John Paul II appointed Anderson to the Pontifical Academy for Life and in 2002 to the Pontifical Council for the Laity. In 2003 he was named a consultor to the Pontifical Council for Justice and Peace. In 2007, Pope Benedict XVI named Anderson as a member of the Pontifical Council for the Family and as a consultor to the Pontifical Council for Social Communications. In 2009, Pope Benedict appointed Anderson to a five-year term on the board of supervisors of the Institute for Works of Religion, also known as the Vatican Bank.

In 1994, he was a member of the Vatican delegation for the Fifteenth Meeting of the International Catholic Jewish Liaison Committee held in Jerusalem.

== Personal life ==
Anderson and his wife, Dorian, are the parents of five children.

== Writings ==
Anderson's 2008 New York Times bestseller, A Civilization of Love: What Every Catholic Can Do to Transform the World, was published by HarperOne. Beyond a House Divided: The Moral Consensus Ignored by Washington, Wall Street and the Media was published by Doubleday in 2010. He is the co-author, with Father José Granados, of Called to Love: Approaching John Paul II's Theology of the Body (Doubleday, 2009) and Our Lady of Guadalupe: Mother of the Civilization of Love (DoubleDay 2009) with Eduardo Chávez Sánchez, and is the co-editor with Livio Melina of The Way of Love: Reflections on Pope Benedict XVI's Encyclical Deus Caritas Est (Ignatius Press, 2006). His book, These Liberties We Hold Sacred: Essays on Faith and Citizenship in the 21st Century was published in 2021 by Square One Publishers. His books have been published in French, Spanish, Italian, German, Polish, Portuguese, Korean, and Ukrainian.

Religious titles
Preceded by Virgil Dechant	Supreme Knight of the Knights of Columbus; 2000–2021	Succeeded by Patrick E. Kelly
