= Dennis Savoie =

Ambassador of Canada to the Holy See
- In office 2014–2024
- Preceded by: Anne Leahy
- Succeeded by: Joyce Napier

Deputy Supreme Knight of the Knights of Columbus
- In office October 2006 – 2014
- Succeeded by: Logan Ludwig

Supreme Treasurer of the Knights of Columbus
- In office April 2006 – October 2006

Assistant Supreme Treasurer of the Knights of Columbus
- In office 2004–2006

Supreme Director of the Knights of Columbus
- In office 1995–2004

State Deputy of New Brunswick
- In office 1992–1994

Personal details
- Spouse: Claudette Surette
- Children: Marc and Brigitte

Dennis Savoie is a former Canada ambassador to the Holy See. He previously served as Deputy Supreme Knight of the Knights of Columbus from 2006–2013. In 1995, he was elected a Supreme Director, and became Assistant Supreme Treasurer and assistant to the Supreme Knight for Canadian affairs in 2004, and then Supreme Treasurer in 2006.

== Early career ==
Mr. Savoie graduated with a Bachelor of Arts degree from the Université de Moncton in New Brunswick in 1968, where he majored in sociology. He also studied business there at the graduate level.

He went on to a successful career with the New Brunswick Electric Power Corp., where he worked for 27 years before retiring as a vice president in 1996. From 2000 to 2004, he served as executive director of the New Brunswick Association of Nursing Homes.

For three years, Mr. Savoie served on the Federal Advisory Committee on Judicial Appointments for New Brunswick. He also serves on the board of directors for the Catholic Organization for Life and Family co-sponsored by the Canadian Conference of Catholic Bishops and the Knights of Columbus. He held positions of several New Brunswick school boards and served on the boards of governors of Université de Moncton and St. Thomas University.

== Knights of Columbus ==
Mr. Savoie joined the Knights of Columbus in 1973 at Msgr. Solyme Azzie Council 2331 in Grand Falls, N.B., rising to the office of grand knight, a position he also held at Père Levasseur Council 5619 in Tracadie. He was charter grand knight of Sainte-Anne-des-Pays-Bas Council 8409 in Fredericton. He is a Fourth Degree member of Père Levasseur Assembly in Tracadie.

Savoie was the New Brunswick State Deputy from 1992 to 1994. In 1995, he was elected a supreme director, and became assistant supreme treasurer and assistant to the supreme knight for Canadian affairs in 2004, and then supreme treasurer in 2006. He was elected deputy supreme knight and assistant to the supreme knight for Canadian affairs in October 2006, positions he held until December 2013.

== Ambassador to the Holy See ==
On February 11, 2013, the day Pope Benedict resigned, Savoie was first approached about becoming ambassador. He turned down the appointment, saying his work with the Knights was too important. He was approached again in the spring of 2014, shortly after he resigned from the Knights and returned to New Brunswick.

On August 1, 2014 he was appointed as ambassador and Savoie presented his credentials to Pope Francis on December 15, 2013. The new ambassador gave the pope a five-volume history of Notre-Dame de Quebec as a gift after a private conversation. The ceremony whereby he presented his credentials was part of a solemn and formal day.

== Personal life ==
Savoie has a wife, Claudette, and two children, Marc and Brigitte. He has five grandchildren.
