= Charles J. Ducey =

Deputy Supreme Knight of the Knights of Columbus

- Born: April 7, 1906; New York City, New York, US
- Died: July 5, 1985 (aged 79); New Haven, Connecticut, US
- Occupation: Deputy Supreme Knight of the Knights of Columbus
- Years active: 1966-1976

Charles J. Ducey (April 7, 1906 – July 5, 1985) was Deputy Supreme Knight of the Knights of Columbus.

== Personal life ==
Ducey was the son of Mr. and Mrs. Joseph Ducey in Orleans County, New York. He received a bachelor's degree from St. Bonaventure University. He then received a master's degree in the Boy Guidance program at the University of Notre Dame in 1928. He won the Charles Carroll of Carrollton Medal in 1950 from the Commodore John Barry Assembly of the Knights of Columbus.

Ducey was married and had a single daughter. He was made a member of the Order of St. Gregory the Great in 1967.

== Knight of Columbus ==
After graduating from Notre Dame, Ducey went to work for the Knights of Columbus. While there, he was the director of the Boy Life Bureau and ran the Columbian Squires program. Under his leadership, the Squires program saw a revival after declining during the Great Depression. In the 1930s, he established the Service Department at the Supreme office.

In 1964 he became Assistant Supreme Secretary, and in that role a year later he chaired the Ceremonials Commission to devise new ceremonies "consistent with the modern day philosophy of social justice and religious practice." From 1966 to April 1976, Ducey served as Deputy Supreme Knight. He was a member of the San Salvador Council and the John Barry General Assembly.

== Charitable work ==
Ducey was president of the Community Chest of New Haven, was organizer and first president of the Holy Name Society of St. Kita's Parish in Hamden, Connecticut, and an instructor in the New Haven Diocesan Labor Schools for two years. He was also the first president of the Travelers' Aid Society of New Haven and a board member of the Visiting Nurse Association of New Haven. Duccey served as chairman of the Hamden Library Board, was a member of the Governor's Committee on Libraries, and was a member of the American Library Association.

Ducey was also a member of the Quinnipiac Council of the Boy Scouts of America, a director of war bond campaigns, and was active with Serra International, Catholic Family Services of New Haven, and the USO. He also served as a delegate to the White House Conference on International Cooperation.

== Works cited ==
- Kauffman, Christopher J. (1982). Faith and Fraternalism: The History of the Knights of Columbus, 1882–1982. Harper and Row. ISBN 978-0-06-014940-6.
