= Jean Migneault =

Jean Migneault was a former Deputy Supreme Knight of the Knights of Columbus, a position he held from 2000 to 2006. Before that Migneault was Assistant Supreme Treasurer and Supreme Treasurer.

He is a native of Quebec, Canada and holds a degree in management and administration from the University of Quebec in Montreal. In 1985, the citizens of St-Basile le Grand named him Citizen of the Year in honor of his many civic contributions. In 1989, he received l'Ordre du Merite Colombien (the Order of Merit in Columbianism), the highest decoration of the province of Quebec for the Knights of Columbus.

In 2000, Pope John Paul II named Migneault a Knight of the Order of St. Gregory the Great. He has been a Grand Officer of the Order of St. Francis since 2002 and was promoted to the office of Grand Croix in 2004. He became a Knight of the Holy Sepulcher in 2004. He died in 2008.
