= Virgil C. Dechant =

12th Supreme Knight of the Knights of Columbus (1930–2020)

Virgil Dechant GCPO GCSG KHS

12th Supreme Knight of the Knights of Columbus
- In office January 21, 1977 – September 30, 2000
- Preceded by: John W. McDevitt
- Succeeded by: Carl A. Anderson

Personal details
- Born: September 24, 1930 Antonino, Kansas, U.S.
- Died: February 15, 2020 (aged 89) Leawood, Kansas, U.S.
- Spouse: Ann L. Dechant
- Children: 4

Virgil C. Dechant GCPO GCSG KHS (September 24, 1930 – February 15, 2020) was the twelfth Supreme Knight of the Knights of Columbus, a position he held from January 21, 1977, to September 30, 2000.

== Biography ==
Dechant was born September 24, 1930, in Antonino, Ellis County, Kansas, and lived in Leawood, Kansas. His ancestors were German-Russians from the Mariental region. He and his wife Ann L. Dechant had four children and 12 grandchildren.

Prior to joining the Knights of Columbus in 1967 in the role of Supreme Secretary, Dechant worked as a farmer and a farm equipment salesperson. He also owned a car dealership.

Dechant served as the vice president of the Vatican Bank, a Gentleman of His Holiness, and a Councillor on the State Council for Vatican City.

He had the honor of escorting President George W. Bush to the funeral of Pope John Paul II.

Dechant stepped down as Supreme Knight of the Knights of Columbus on September 30, 2000, at the age of seventy after serving the longest term ever by a Supreme Knight. He was succeeded by Carl A. Anderson.

Dechant died on February 15, 2020, at the age of 89.

== Distinctions ==
- Knight Grand Cross of the Order of Pope Pius IX
- Knight Grand Cross of the Order of St. Gregory the Great
- Knight of Magistral Grace of the Sovereign Military Order of Malta
- Knight of the Equestrian Order of the Holy Sepulchre of Jerusalem
- Cross of Merit with Gold Star of the Equestrian Order of the Holy Sepulchre of Jerusalem
- National Right to Life award along with Senator Jesse Helms (1998)
- Gaudium and Spes Medal of the Knights of Columbus

Religious titles
Preceded by John W. McDevitt	Supreme Knight of the Knights of Columbus; 1977-2000	Succeeded by Carl A. Anderson
