= North Atlantic Council Fifth Session =

The Fifth Session of the North Atlantic Council was a historic meeting of the North Atlantic Council that took place at the Waldorf Astoria hotel in New York City from September 15 to September 18, 1950, and included representatives from all founding NATO countries. At the meeting, the United States put forth that it was committed to the defense of Western Europe by increasing U.S. forces on the contingent that (West) Germany would also make a substantial armed contribution to the defense. Secretary of State Dean Acheson outlined the U.S. position on the defense of Western Europe in a series of initiatives that embodied the “One Package” proposal submitted to President Truman on September 5, 1950. The proposal met strong resistance from the French who were committed to a neutral, demilitarized Germany called for in the Potsdam and Yalta agreements. The proposal received support from Britain, Canada, Italy, the Netherlands and Norway; however, the rest of the founding NATO countries remained uncommitted in order to measure French reaction.

== Background ==
Beginning in late 1947 the U.S. Defense Department and the Central Intelligence Agency maintained that the defense of Europe could not be met without the willing and active participation of (West) Germany and control of the Ruhr. This view was also shared in early 1950 by several officials on the continent of Europe such as Field Marshal Viscount Montgomery, General Omar Bradley, General Lucius D. Clay and Konrad Adenauer. However, until the invasion of South Korea by North Korea in Jun of 1950, the U.S. State Department’s policy was to continue with German demilitarization. The start of the Korean War brought stronger support for West German participation in European defense.

Specifically, The High Commissioner for Occupied Germany John J. McCloy stated to Secretary of State Dean Acheson that if Germany was lost militarily there would be no hope of getting it back and General George C. Marshall also stated directly to Acheson that the invasion by North Korea showed the Soviet Union was prepared to use force (initially, through satellite countries) to achieve political ends. As a result of this strong support, Acheson declared that, “my conversion to German participation in European defense was quick,” and subsequently on July 31, 1950, discussed with President Truman different methods of merging West Germany’s military contribution into a European Army or North Atlantic Army with an integrated command and supply system. Influenced by Acheson’s strong advocation for (West) German military participation in the defense of Western Europe, President Truman on August 27, 1950, gave Acheson and Secretary of Defense Louis Johnson a list of questions on how to specifically strengthen the defense of Europe and (West) Germany’s participation in it.

== The “One Package” Proposal ==
The U.S. Defense Department believed that the defense of Europe needed to be augmented by increased allied forces, increased American troops, increased military aid, inclusion of armed German units and to integrate the entire effort under one command. However, the Department was steadfast that all of the elements needed to be in, “one package.” The Defense Department said it would not recommend more forces in Europe, or the responsibility of the United States assuming the unified command of a combined European force, unless there was also armed (West) German participation. The Defense Department and State Department agreed to the “One Package Proposal” and delivered it to President Truman on September 5, 1950, as an encapsulation of the list of questions he had given them on how to strengthen the defense of Europe. The proposal specifically stated that:

1. There should be an increase in U.S. ground forces in Europe of four to six divisions.
2. That an armed German division should be added without a German general staff.
3. There should be substantial increase in French and British forces in Europe.
4. That all allied forces, including the U.S., should be combined in to a European (NATO) Defense Force with an international staff and a Supreme Commander.
5. That an executive group should be established in the NATO Military Production and Supply Board to coordinate and increase European military production and supply.
6. That the U.S. would accept the responsibility of supreme command:
  - Only if the U.S. allies request it.
  - Only if the U.S. allies undertook the obligations previously outlined in the proposal.
  - Only long enough to discover whether the U.S. allies could perform the obligations outlined in the proposal.

== French reaction ==
From the outset, according to Secretary of State Acheson, the French took the proposal very hard. Prime Minister Robert Schuman said that he embraced every aspect of the proposal except German military participation. On October 5, after the 5th session of the North Atlantic Council was adjourned, the French countered the U.S. proposal with the Pleven Plan. The Pleven Plan stated that:

1. European allies would pledge forces for the defense of Europe under the command of a Supreme Commander in a time of war.
2. In addition, a standing, special European army would be created under a European Minister of defense, also under the Supreme Commander, with its own command and staff structure. The army would be composed of contributions from the allies and a German contingent at the battalion level. The force would be composed of about 100,000 men.

To the French, the Pleven Plan had the attraction of a German contribution to the defense of Europe (though a small one )without “rearmament of Germany”. That is, without the creation of a German Ministry of Defense, armament industry, or general staff. The American’s, however, felt that the German contribution was too limited and subsequently countered with the Spofford Plan (also known as the Spofford Compromise) which the French accepted. The Spofford Plan was finalized at the December, 1950 6th Session of the North Atlantic Council in Brussels where the integrated defense of NATO was finalized and General Dwight D. Eisenhower was designated the first Supreme Allied Commander Europe(SACEUR) and included a German contribution to the defense of Western Europe.
