= Herbert F. Geisler =

American politician

Member of the Illinois House of Representatives

Personal details
- Born: Herbert Frederick Geisler; November 15, 1904 Chicago, Illinois
- Died: July 13, 1983 (aged 78) Bensenville, Illinois
- Party: Republican

Herbert Frederick Geisler (November 15, 1904 – July 13, 1983) was an American attorney and politician who served as a member of the Illinois House of Representatives. He was the first person to use a Seeing Eye dog in the city of Chicago.

== Biography ==
Geisler was born in Chicago to Otto Geisler, a German-American confectioner, and his wife, Caroline Friederike Marie Lange, who emigrated from Mecklenburg-Strelitz as a baby. An accident left Geisler completely blind at age 7. He nevertheless graduated at the top of his class at Marshall Metropolitan High School in 1923 and at his pre-law class at the University of Chicago. In 1929, he graduated from the University of Chicago Law School, where he was class president. Unable to get a job, he worked pro bono as a public defender until he opened his own firm.

Geisler served as a city alderman from 1947–59. In 1948, he was the Republican congressional candidate for Illinois's 8th congressional district but was defeated in the general election by incumbent Thomas S. Gordon. In 1954, he unsuccessfully ran for U.S. Senate. He served in the Illinois General Assembly from 1965–71.

== Seeing Eye dog ==
Geisler was among the earliest Americans using Seeing Eye dogs, which were introduced to the United States from Switzerland in 1929. In 1934, he became the first person to use a guide dog in Chicago. In the 1930s, he successfully lobbied the city of Chicago to prohibit public buildings and transportation from denying access to guide dogs. His guide dogs were part of his public life and campaigning events.
