= Julius Klein =

American journalist, spy, business executive and US Army general (1901–1984)

- Born: September 5, 1901; Chicago, Illinois, U.S.
- Died: April 6, 1984 (aged 82); Great Lakes, Illinois, U.S.
- Occupations: journalist, spy, business executive and United States Army general.

Julius Klein (September 5, 1901 – April 6, 1984) was an American journalist, spy, business executive and United States Army general.

== Early life ==
Klein was born in Chicago in 1901. His parents were Austrian Jewish immigrants to the U.S. who relocated to Berlin during Klein's childhood. He was interned by German authorities during World War I, but escaped to France and joined the U.S. Army as a spy.

== Civilian career ==
After serving as a spy in Germany in World War I, Klein began his civilian career in the 1920s as a criminal reporter for The State Herald, a Hearst Corporation newspaper in Chicago, and initiated the first German language radio broadcasts in the United States. Klein also originated the South Pacific edition of The Stars and Stripes military newspaper, unsuccessfully ran for Congressman at Large as Republican in 1932, and for the United States Senate in 1954. He wrote the screenplay, Black Cargo, during a Hollywood stint (1934–39) when Klein tried unsuccessfully to produce films on the life of General John Pershing.

== World War II ==
In 1933 Klein joined the Illinois National Guard, becoming a lieutenant colonel in 1941. He formulated the Combat Public Relations plan dealing with psychological warfare and propaganda and was also stationed in the Philippines. During this time Klein also worked as a journalist for the Chicago Herald-Examiner, published his own periodical (The National Free Press) with his nephew Joseph Roos, and conducted domestic intelligence gathering and spy operations authorized by both Illinois governor Henry Horner and Colonel (later General) George C. Marshall. Over the years, Klein had built a positive relationship with German Consul Georg Gyssling, which continued up until the time that Gyssling was recalled to Germany in 1941. After the war, Klein's letter of commendation for Gyssling was one of the factors that saved Gyssling from being convicted as a Nazi war criminal.

== Public service ==
In 1947, Julius Klein was elected the National Commander of the Jewish War Veterans of the United States of America. On April 4, 1948, as National Commander of the Jewish War Veterans, Klein organized an enormous show of strength for the establishment of the State of Israel in the form of a JWV parade down New York's Fifth Avenue. The parade influenced the United States to vote for the partition of Palestine and the State of Israel was born in May, 1948.
