= Edward A. Hayes =

American lawyer

16th national commander of The American Legion
- In office 1933–1934
- Preceded by: Louis A. Johnson
- Succeeded by: Frank N. Belgrano

Personal details
- Born: Edward Arthur Hayes; January 5, 1893 Morrisonville, Illinois, U.S.
- Died: April 1, 1955 (aged 62) Chicago, Illinois, U.S.
- Resting place: Calvary Cemetery, Decatur, Illinois, U.S. 39°50′41.0″N 88°58′35.0″W
- Education: Saint Louis University
- Occupation: Lawyer

Military service
- Allegiance: United States
- Branch/service: United States Navy Reserve
- Rank: Captain
- Battles/wars: World War I; World War II

Edward Arthur Hayes (January 5, 1893 – April 1, 1955) served as the 16th national commander of The American Legion, from 1933 to 1934.

== Early life and career ==
Edward Hayes was born on January 5, 1893, in Morrisonville, Illinois. After his birth his family moved to Decatur, Illinois. He attended St. Louis University where he studied law. He served as an ensign in the United States Navy during World War I.

He was a practicing lawyer for 35 years and worked as assistant attorney general in Illinois from 1928 to 1933, resigning his state position upon being elected to the office of the national commander of The American Legion.

== American Legion ==
Hayes joined The American Legion shortly after World War I and quickly climbed the ranks. By 1929 he was department commander of The American Legion in Illinois and by 1933 he was national commander.

The Department of Illinois was known as a conservative branch of The American Legion. When Hayes became national commander, he carried these conservative views with him. The Legion demanded patriotic education for the children of United States, with Hayes saying to the National Education Association that the Legion, "has the right to demand that education be constructive for the country's welfare and that it be patriotic in character". Throughout this period, the Legion fought unsuccessfully to obtain passage of a law requiring a loyalty oath for teachers. When the campaign failed the Legion began a "vigorous campaign of Americanism". This campaign was not solely focused on communism, fascism was also considered a threat to the American way of life, thus the Legion advocated the removal of both from the classroom.

Since its creation The American Legion has been a strong advocate of anti-communist ideology. Hayes was an especially fervently anti-communist, when he was told Communist protestors were stepping on American flags during a protest Hayes was quoted as saying, "If we catch them doing that, I think there is enough virility in The American Legion personnel to adequately take care of that type of person". In response to his uncompromising attitude towards communism He was referred to as the "semi-fascist leader" of the Legion by author John Gunther .

Hayes spent much of his time in Washington, DC lobbying for the restoration of benefits to disabled veterans that had been cut due to the Great Depression. When he was not campaigning in the Capitol he traveled the nation, taking the message to as many Americans as possible to increase the lobbying pressure for the restoration of disabled veterans compensation. Hayes's lobbying, in addition to Senator Bennett Clark, were responsible for the passage of Public Law No. 141 which restored disability compensation rates to pre-Depression levels and expanded services for veterans despite opposition from the Roosevelt Administration.

== Later life ==
Hayes served several political positions after his time in the Legion. He managed Frank Knox's vice presidential campaign when Knox ran on the Republican ticket with Alf Landon in 1936. He was one of the organizers of the grass roots Republican Illinois State conference in 1935. He served as platform and program committee chairman on both Illinois and National levels in the Republican party on several occasions, and first sought public office as candidate for nomination as attorney general on the Republican ticket in 1940. During the Second World War, he served in Washington as a special assistant to Secretary of the Navy Frank Knox. In 1954, he was a candidate for the Republican Illinois senatorial nomination. In the primary, he was second, being defeated by Joseph Meek. He entered a Chicago hospital 21 March 1955 for a bladder operation and was believed to be recovering when he suffered a heart attack and died.

Non-profit organization positions
Preceded by Louis A. Johnson	National commander of The American Legion; 1933 - 1934	Succeeded by Frank N. Belgrano
