= Revolt of the Admirals =

US Navy funding and policy dispute (1949)

The "Revolt of the Admirals" was a policy and funding dispute within the United States government during the Cold War in 1949, involving a number of retired and active duty United States Navy admirals. These included serving officers Admiral Louis E. Denfeld, Chief of Naval Operations, and Vice Admiral Gerald F. Bogan, as well as Fleet Admirals Chester Nimitz and William Halsey, senior officers during World War II.

The episode occurred at a time when President Harry S. Truman and Secretary of Defense Louis A. Johnson were seeking to reduce military expenditures in the aftermath of World War II so Truman could redirect funding to his domestic priorities. This policy involved deep cuts to the U.S. Navy and U.S. Marine Corps, while making the United States Air Force and strategic nuclear bombing the primary means of defending American interests. The Navy sought to carve out a role for itself in strategic bombing with naval aviation, which the Air Force saw as one of its primary roles.

Partly driven by interservice rivalry, the debate escalated from differences over strategy to the question of civilian control over the military. The cancellation of the aircraft carrier USS United States and accusations of impropriety by Johnson in regard to the purchase of the Convair B-36 Peacemaker bomber for the Air Force led to an investigation by the House Committee on Armed Services chaired by Congressman Carl Vinson.

While the dispute was settled in favor of the Truman administration, the outbreak of the Korean War in June 1950 demonstrated the shortcomings of a defense policy primarily reliant on nuclear weapons, and many of the proposed cuts to conventional forces were ultimately reversed.

== Background ==
=== Armed forces unification ===
During World War II, the War Powers Act of 1941 allowed the President broad power to reorganize the armed forces, but this authority was to expire six months after the end of the war. In April 1944, the United States Congress began considering legislation for post-war organization. In response, the Joint Chiefs of Staff (JCS), the wartime body consisting of the most senior uniformed leaders prepared to make its own recommendations, as the organization of the JCS and its various advisory committees were themselves ad hoc wartime creations. On 9 May 1944, the JCS appointed a Special Committee for Reorganization of National Defense under the chairmanship of Admiral James O. Richardson, a former Commander in Chief, United States Fleet, consisting of Major General William F. Tompkins from the War Department General Staff, Major General Harold L. George from the USAAF, Rear Admiral Malcolm F. Schoeffel and Colonel F. Trubee Davison, a former Assistant Secretary of War for Air.

The committee reported to the JCS on 11 April 1945. It endorsed the unification of the War and Navy Departments into a single department of armed forces headed by a civilian secretary, with three equal services through the creation of an independent U.S. Air Force. During the war, the United States Army Air Forces (USAAF) had achieved a degree of de facto independence from the United States Army and was eager to become a fully-fledged armed service on an equal footing with the Army and the United States Navy. Richardson dissented, favoring the status quo over the creation of a new department, but he accepted the proposal to perpetuate the organization of the JCS by statute.

Senior Navy officers including Fleet Admirals William D. Leahy (the Chief of Staff to the Commander in Chief), Ernest J. King (the Commander in Chief, United States Fleet) and Chester W. Nimitz (the Commander in Chief, US Pacific Fleet) regarded the committee's recommendations as radical. They opposed the idea of a single secretary of National Defense, which they felt was too much responsibility for one man, and it interposed a civilian head between the JCS and the President of the United States, which might diminish the Navy's power and influence. They also feared the possible loss of the Navy's air arm, as had happened to the Royal Navy when the Royal Naval Air Service was absorbed into the Royal Air Force upon the creation of the latter in 1918.

The Senate Committee on Military Affairs formed a subcommittee to draft legislation, with Major General Lauris Norstad, the Assistant Chief of the Air Staff for Plans, and Rear Admiral Arthur W. Radford, the Deputy Chief of Naval Operations (DCNO) for Air, as its advisors. Radford was considered a hard liner in his opposition to unification even within the Navy, and in July 1946, James Forrestal, the Secretary of the Navy and Nimitz, now the Chief of Naval Operations (CNO), replaced him with the DCNO for Operations, Rear Admiral Forrest Sherman. Although also a naval aviator, Sherman did not oppose unification. He and Norstad drew up an agreement that was endorsed by the JCS and forwarded to President Harry S. Truman, for approval on 12 December 1946.

This became the basis for the National Security Act of 1947, which created the National Security Council (NSC), Central Intelligence Agency (CIA), an independent United States Air Force (USAF), three civilian military department heads and the National Military Establishment, a unified command with a cabinet-level Secretary of Defense to oversee the service departments and the JCS. The Act left the Navy with the autonomy it sought, and control of its own Naval and Marine Corps Aviation, effectively legitimizing four military air forces. The act appeared to end the debate, although none of the services was completely happy with it.

Forrestal, a former naval aviator who had led the fight against unification, was appointed the first Secretary of Defense; John L. Sullivan, formerly the Assistant Secretary of the Navy (AIR) succeeded him as Secretary of the Navy; Kenneth C. Royall, the Under Secretary of War, became the Secretary of the Army; and Stuart Symington, who had been the Assistant Secretary of War for Air, became the first Secretary of the Air Force. As the Navy had wanted, the Secretary of Defense had a coordination role and lacked the authority and resources to exercise effective control over service departments and their chiefs. Forrestal hoped that with unification accomplished, the services would set aside their parochial differences.

=== Budgets and strategy ===
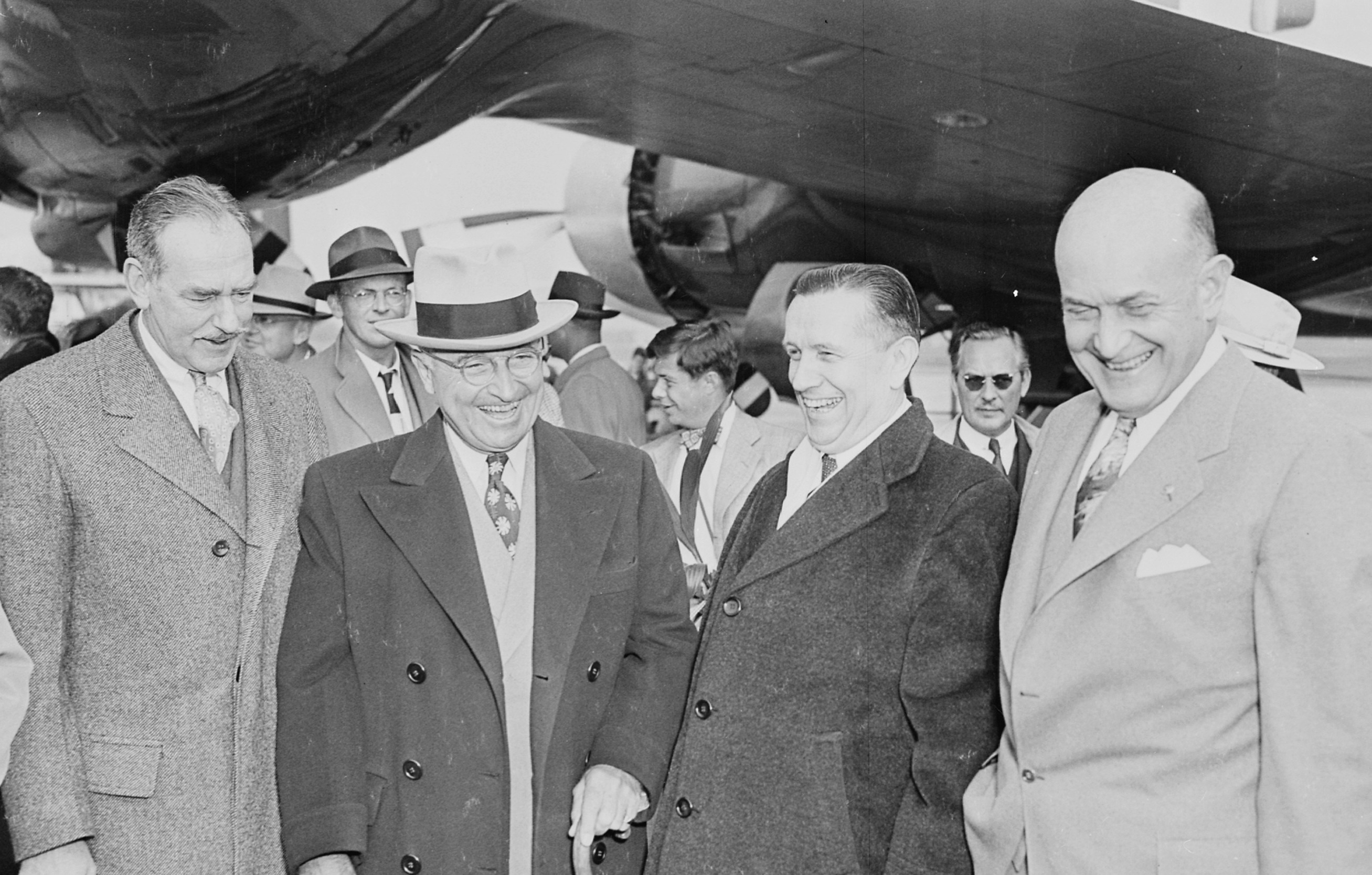
President Truman with Secretary of State Dean Acheson (left) and Secretary of Defense Louis A. Johnson (far right)

Following the end of World War II, the United States Government was concerned about the large deficit spending that had been necessary for the war effort, which reached 119 percent of the gross domestic product (GDP) in 1946. Deficit spending had lifted the United States out of the Great Depression, but now Truman and his economic advisors were concerned about the prospect of inflation, which rose to 14.4 percent in 1947 after wartime price controls were removed, and embraced austerity. To reduce expenditures, the armed services had to quickly demobilize and return to a peacetime military. Defense budgets declined from $81 billion in fiscal year 1945 (equivalent to $1116 billion in 2024) to $9 billion in fiscal year 1948 (equivalent to $94 billion in 2024), representing a decline from 37.5 percent of GDP to 3.5 percent. The services were reduced from 89 Army and Marine divisions to 12; from 213 Air Force air groups to 63 (only 11 of which were operational, with some existing only on paper); and from 1,166 Navy warships to 343. Meanwhile, $13 billion went into the Marshall Plan, from 1948 to 1952.

US war plans were drafted for a potential conflict with the Soviet Union. It was considered unlikely that the Soviet Union wanted to start a war, but the plans were prepared for the possibility that one might break out as a result of a miscalculation. The Soviet Union had fifty divisions in Germany and Austria to the U.S. Army's one, enough to quickly overrun Europe east of the Rhine. This was a major barrier, but it was not considered that it could be held for long, forcing a retreat to the Pyrenees. In view of the Soviet Union's overwhelming superiority in conventional forces, the planners felt that the United States had no alternative means of striking back other than a strategic air offensive employing both conventional and nuclear weapons.

Admiral Louis E. Denfeld, who had succeeded Nimitz as CNO on 15 December 1947, was critical of the war plan, which he regarded as deeply flawed. He noted that abandoning Western Europe without a struggle ran counter to the US Government policy of building up the democracies there, and it meant accepting the loss of the Mediterranean Sea as well. The plan called for using the Karachi area as a base for the strategic air campaign, but this would involve an enormous logistical effort to sustain, and it would not support other elements of the war plan. Moreover, there was no fallback in case the strategic bombing campaign failed. He was willing to sign off on the plan only as a temporary one for short-range planning and advocated a more aggressive strategy in which the Rhine and Middle East were held. None of the three services had the resources to implement the short-term war plan, much less the more ambitious one.

=== Strategic bombing ===
In the years leading up to World War II, the United States Army Air Corps had developed a doctrine of strategic bombing, which was promulgated by the Air Corps Tactical School. The experience of strategic bombing during World War II revealed major flaws in the Air Corps', later Army Air Forces', precision bombing doctrine. Unescorted bombers were found to be highly vulnerable to enemy fighter aircraft and took high losses. Improvements in anti-aircraft guns drove the bombers to higher altitudes, from which accurate bombing was difficult. None of the principal targets of the bombing offensive in Europe was destroyed or even suffered severe disruption and only the oil campaign was ultimately regarded as successful. Air raids on Japan encountered weather and flying conditions that made daylight precision bombing from high altitude even more difficult than in Europe, resulting in a switch of tactics to low-level area bombing of cities with incendiaries. The wartime Chief of the USAAF, General of the Army Henry H. Arnold, contended that the conventional bombing had destroyed Japan's ability to wage war, and the atomic bombing of Hiroshima and Nagasaki had given the Emperor of Japan an excuse to end the war.

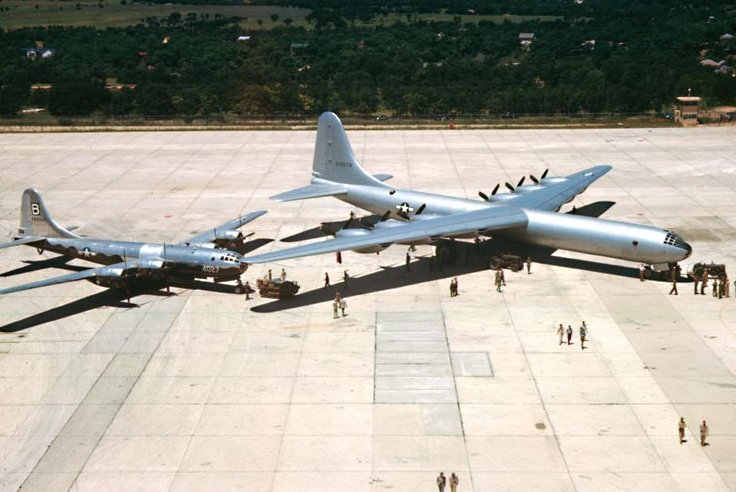
The Convair XB-36 Peacemaker bomber prototype dwarfs a Boeing B-29 Superfortress bomber, the largest bomber of World War II.

The advent of nuclear weapons gave the strategic bombardment theorists encouragement that the factors that had limited the effectiveness of strategic bombing during the war could be overcome. Colonel Dale O. Smith, USAF, wrote that:

[T]he most effective air siege will result by concurrently attacking every critical element of the enemy's economy at the same time. This will result in a general disintegration of all industry that will, in turn, prevent reconstruction. Oil, transportation, power, vital end products, and weapon factories, if destroyed concurrently, would leave a nation in such a devastated state as to preclude repair, since the capability for repair would have been lost as well. When our bombs were constructed of puny TNT this concept was questionable because we did not have sufficient power and we were forced to look for panacea targets, Achilles' heels, and short cuts ... If all the critical industrial systems could be destroyed at one blow, so that recuperation were impossible within any foreseeable time, there seems little question but that a nation would die just as surely as a man will die if a bullet pierces his heart and his circulatory system is stopped.

The bombing campaign called for in the war plans was both nuclear and conventional. By June 1948, components for about fifty Fat Man and two Little Boy bombs were on hand. These had to be assembled by specially trained Armed Forces Special Weapons Project assembly teams. Only Silverplate Boeing B-29 Superfortress bombers were capable of delivering nuclear weapons, and of the 65 that had been made, only 32 were operational at the start of 1948, all of which were assigned to the 509th Bombardment Group, which was based at Walker Air Force Base, formerly Roswell Army Airfield, in New Mexico. Trained crews were also in short supply; at the beginning of 1948 only six crews were qualified to fly atomic bombing missions, although enough personnel had been trained to assemble an additional fourteen in an emergency. But up to 20 percent of the target cities in the war plan were beyond the 3,000-nautical-mile (5,600 km) range of the B-29, requiring a one-way mission, which would expend the crew, bomb and aircraft. There were also doubts about the ability of the B-29 to penetrate Soviet air space; as a propeller-driven bomber, it was highly vulnerable to the new Soviet jet fighters, even at night.

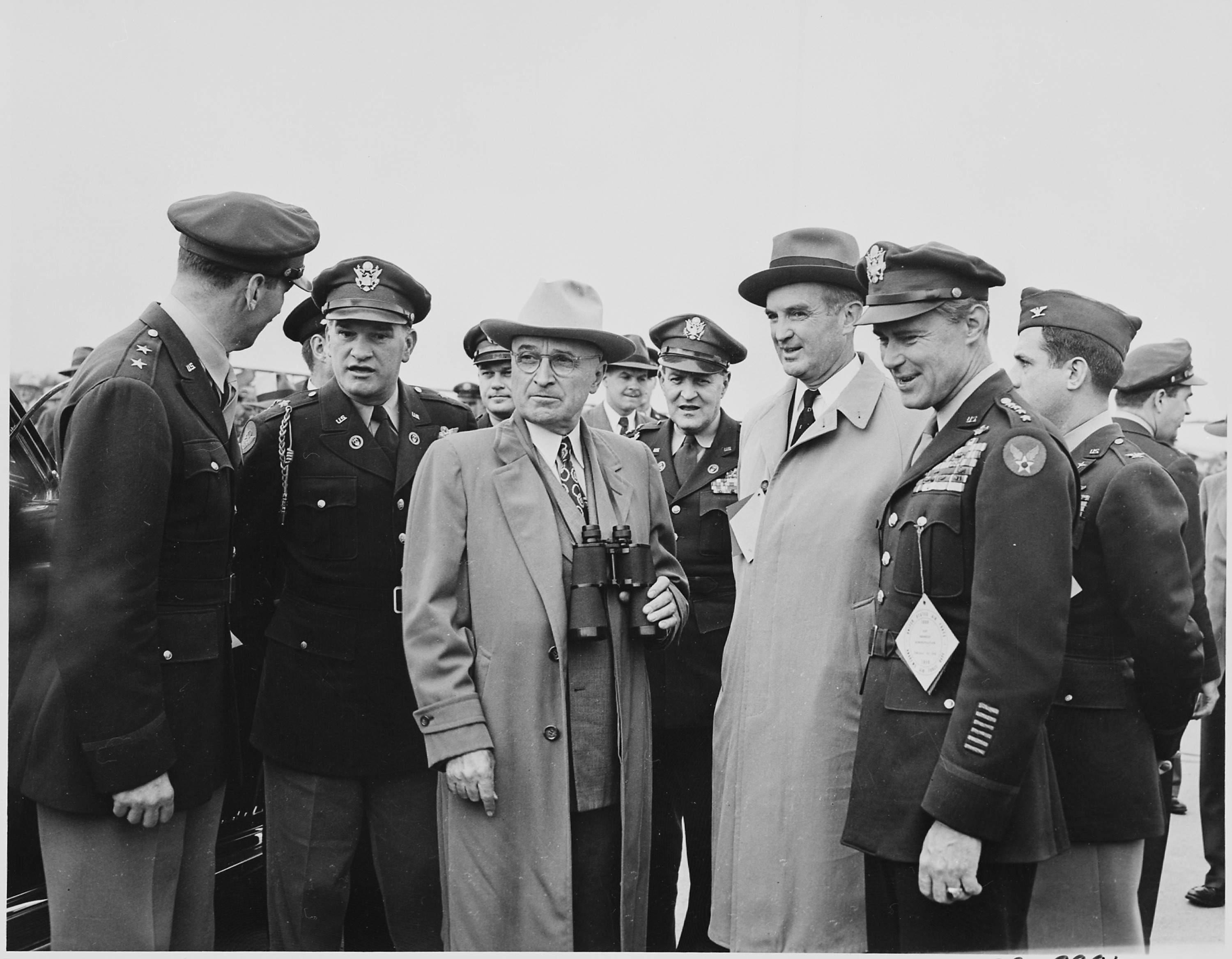
President Harry S. Truman with Secretary of the Air Force Stuart Symington and Chief of Staff of the Air Force Hoyt Vandenberg

The B-29 was the mainstay of the bomber fleet in 1948, but that year the Convair B-36 Peacemaker was introduced into service. During World War II, early German victories had led to apprehension that the United Kingdom might be overrun. The Air Corps therefore invited design proposals for an intercontinental bomber that could reach Germany from bases in the United States. These proposals resulted in the B-36 aircraft, which pushed the state of the art, but soon ran into development and schedule problems, and lost priority to the B-29. It was not canceled, and in 1943 when it looked like bases in China—the only ones in Allied hands at the time within B-29 range of Japan—might be overrun, an order was placed for 100 B-36s. Most aircraft orders were cut back or canceled in 1945, but the B-36 order was left untouched.

Many Air Force officers were skeptical of the value of the B-36, but in tests conducted between April and June 1948, the B-36 outperformed the Boeing B-50 Superfortress, the improved model of the B-29, in long-range cruising speed, load capacity and combat radius. The commencement of the Berlin Blockade in June 1948 led to increased concerns about the aggressive stance taken by the Soviet Union, and demands for an intercontinental bomber. The B-36 was not yet atomic capable; deliveries of atomic-capable B-36s commenced in 1949. In service, it suffered from a host of problems, as was usual for new aircraft. An intrinsic one was that it was a piston-engine aircraft in the era of jets. It was therefore accepted as an interim aircraft, pending the introduction of the jet Boeing B-52 Stratofortress, but this was not expected to occur before 1952.

The 80th Congress adjourned in August 1948 without passing a bill authorizing a 70-group peacetime air force, but the Chief of Staff of the Air Force, General Hoyt Vandenberg, took the provision of a first increment of funds for the purpose as a mandate and commenced the acquisition process for the 2,201 aircraft required with the funds on hand. This included the remaining 95 B-36s from the original contract, along with 10 of the new Boeing B-47 Stratojet bombers, 132 B-50s, 1,457 jet fighters and 147 transport planes. In 1948, the services began preparing their budget submissions for fiscal year 1950. The Air Staff requested $8 billion, which would cover the 70-group program. But after word got around that budgets would be cut proportionately, Symington arbitrarily increased the submission to $11 billion. The resulting service requests, when tallied in July, came to $29 billion.

There was no reason to believe that this would be available. The Bureau of the Budget had originally forecast a $5 billion surplus in fiscal year 1950, but the recession of 1949, resulted in a drop in revenue and a revised forecast of a $2 billion deficit. Forrestal cut the defense request to $23.6 billion in October 1948, but the Bureau of the Budget convinced Truman to set a $14.4 billion ceiling on defense expenditure in fiscal year 1950. The Joint Chiefs estimated that in the event of a war, this would reduce the United States reaction to a strategic bombing offensive from the United Kingdom. The Joint Chiefs of Staff divided the $14.4 billion between the three services, giving $4.834 billion to the Army, $4.624 billion to the Navy, and $5.025 billion to the Air Force.

This meant that the Air Force would have to cut back to just 48 groups. Vandenberg convened a senior officers' board chaired by General Joseph T. McNarney to determine an appropriate structure. It decided to reduce the Strategic Air Command to 14 bombardment groups. Its commander Lieutenant General Curtis LeMay, stated that the atomic mission required four groups of bombers, which he said should be equipped with B-36s. The B-36 could cover 97 percent of targets in the Soviet Union from bases in North America, and in the conventional role it could carry 43 short tons (39 t) of bombs over medium distances. He endorsed a proposal to improve the performance of the B-36 by adding twin jet pods (B-47 jet engines). Of the remaining ten bombardment groups, five would be equipped with B-50s, two with the new B-47s, and three with B-29s. The B-36 program actually benefited from the cutbacks, because $269,761,000 was recouped from the cancellation of orders for other aircraft. LeMay also recommended that the Boeing B-54, an improved version of the B-50, be canceled and the funds used to purchase 36 more B-36s and five more B-47s. Forrestal signed off on this recertification of funds in March 1949. That month the board also recommended that B-36 acquisition be limited to what was required for four groups, after which production would be switched over to the B-52.

=== Aircraft carriers ===
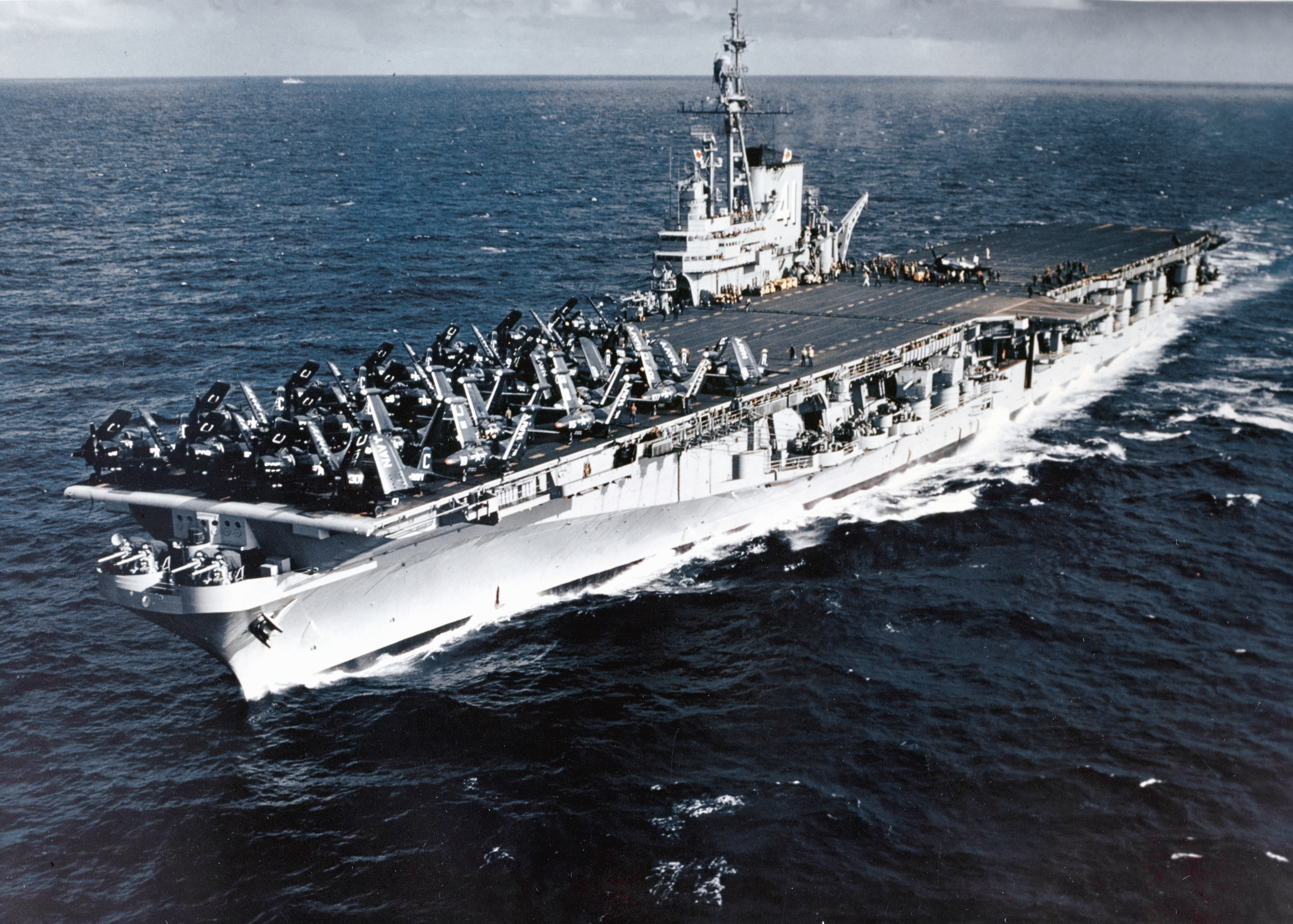
USS Midway in 1952

The Navy had no theoretical framework with which to develop a post-war strategy. Between 1890 and 1945 its doctrine had been based on the teachings of Alfred Thayer Mahan, who stressed the importance of control of the seas in securing the lines of communication through which maritime commerce traveled and argued that the main objective of a Navy was the destruction of the enemy's battle fleet. But the Soviet Union had only a small navy, and as a Eurasian power, it was not dependent on maritime trade, and thus was immune to the effects of a naval blockade. Being in third place for funding behind the Army and Air Force represented a major loss of status for the Navy, which had traditionally seen itself as the nation's first line of defense. The Navy's budget had exceeded the Army's for every year but one between 1922 and 1939. It enjoyed the support of President Franklin D. Roosevelt, and had its own secretary who reported directly to him. The Navy had cultivated political patronage in Congress by dispersing construction and maintenance of its vessels around the nation, and the House Committee on Naval Affairs and the Senate Committee on Naval Affairs had supported the acquisition of expensive capital ships and the development of naval aviation.

The Navy had acquired its first aircraft carriers in 1922, when it commissioned a converted collier as the USS Langley. Carriers accompanied the fleet, and the aircraft had the roles of scouting, observation and attacking enemy vessels. Between 1910 and 1930, around twenty percent of all naval officers went into naval aviation. These included Forrest Sherman, Arthur Radford, Gerald F. Bogan and Daniel V. Gallery, all of whom rose to flag rank in the wartime Navy. Crucially, and in contrast to the Army, where corps loyalty was paramount, the Navy inculcated the attitude that every officer was a naval officer first and a specialist second. This was bolstered by a long-standing ethos of creating a "balanced fleet", in which all of the Navy's specialists played a part. While some naval aviators became zealous advocates of naval air power, they expressed no desire to separate from the Navy.

To operate from carriers, aircraft needed tailhooks and strengthened undercarriages, which made them heavier and less maneuverable than similar land-based aircraft, but fears that they could not compete against land-based fighters proved ultimately groundless; between 1 September 1944 and 15 August 1945, US Navy Grumman F6F Hellcat and Vought F4U Corsair fighters downed 2,948 Japanese fighters against a loss of 191 of their own. However, like strategic bombing, the record of aircraft carriers was not as clear cut as the enthusiasts suggested. Only two battleships were sunk by US carrier aircraft alone: the giant Yamato and Musashi. US carrier aircraft accounted for 4 of the 18 Japanese heavy cruisers that were sunk, 6 of the 25 light cruisers and 27 of the 127 destroyers. What they were particularly lethal against was other aircraft carriers, sinking 11 of the 19 Japanese carriers sunk in the war. In the post-war drawdown, the aircraft carrier fleet was reduced to the three Midway-class and eight Essex-class.

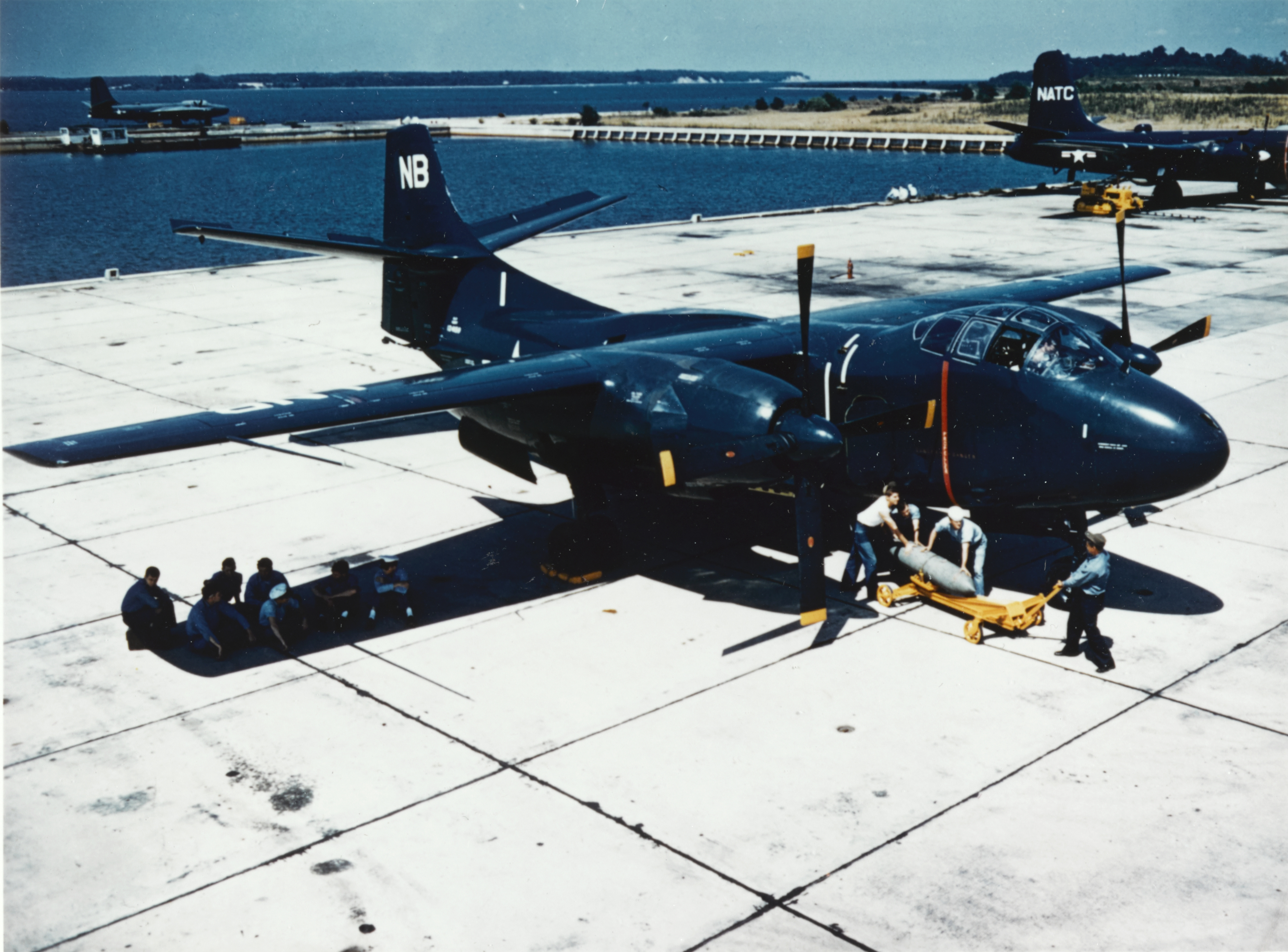
A North American AJ Savage bomber, designed to carry nuclear weapons from aircraft carriers

One role the Navy could play in a conflict with the Soviet Union was participation in strategic bombing. In December 1947, Gallery wrote a top secret memorandum on the subject. The idea was that instead of building a bomber with a range of 5,000 nautical miles (9,300 km; 5,800 mi), Gallery argued that it was a better idea to build one with lesser range that could be launched from an aircraft carrier. Radford noted that any target in the world was within 1,500 nautical miles (2,800 km; 1,700 mi) of the sea. A carrier could be deployed quickly in a crisis, and did not require the establishment of expensive overseas bases. Gallery even went further than most Navy officers in arguing that strategic bombing with nuclear weapons should be the primary mission of the Navy. In forwarding the memo to Sullivan, Denfeld wrote: "I not only consider Rear Admiral Gallery's initiative in preparing the paper was commendable and proper, but that the paper itself demonstrates the type of constructive thinking that the Navy tries at all times to encourage." The memo was leaked to a syndicated newspaper columnist, Drew Pearson, who published it in The Philadelphia Inquirer and the Philadelphia Bulletin. Denfeld gave Gallery a private reprimand for making "an extensive and somewhat uncontrolled distribution of a classified document."

This concept had severe practical limitations in 1948. The characteristics of nuclear weapons were not widely known at the time, but the Navy did have some expertise in officers who had served with the wartime Manhattan Project, principally Deak Parsons, John T. "Chick" Hayward and Frederick L. Ashworth. Twelve Lockheed P2V Neptunes were configured for the atomic mission, and a squadron of them, VC-5, was formed under Hayward's command. A Fat Man atomic bomb was 60 inches (1,500 mm) wide and weighed 10,000 pounds (4,500 kg), and there was no aircraft in the Navy's inventory that could carry a bomb that wide, but the P2V could carry the slimmer 28-inch (710 mm) Little Boy bomb, (although they were in limited supply, with most US nuclear production being of the Fat Man). It was demonstrated that the P2V could take off from the three large Midway-class aircraft carriers with the aid of jet-assisted take-off JATO rockets. The ability to land on one was less certain and never attempted. This meant a one-way mission expending bomb, aircraft and crew (like the 1918 Tondern raid). On 7 March 1949, Hayward flew a simulated atomic bombing mission against California in a P2V launched from the carrier USS Coral Sea off the East Coast. He dropped a pumpkin bomb on the Salton Sea test site near El Centro, California, and then flew back across the country to land at NAS Patuxent River in Maryland. A more suitable aircraft, the North American AJ Savage, was under development.

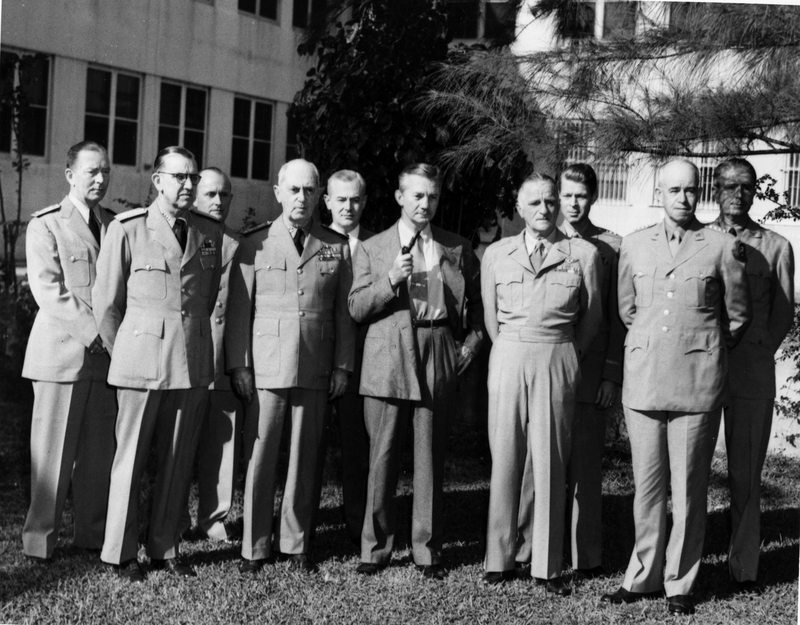
Top officials of the National Military Establishment met in March 1948 for the conference that would result in the Key West Agreement. Participants included admirals Denfeld and Leahy, the secretary of defense James Forrestal, and generals Spaatz and Bradley (pictured in the front row from left to right).

Forrestal considered the notion of a single service having a monopoly on nuclear weapons to be misguided. He convened a conference at Key West from 11 to 14 March 1948 that was attended by the JCS and one deputy each to discuss the roles of the different services. The resulting Key West Agreement assigned primary responsibility for strategic bombing to the Air Force, but the Navy was not prohibited from participating. Forrestal laid down that the Navy would be utilised when it had capacities for delivery. Navy leadership doubted that wars could be won by strategic bombing alone, and some naval officers had a moral objection to relying upon the widespread use of nuclear weapons to destroy the major population centers. Most felt that atomic bombs were best used against targets like submarine pens and logistical hubs rather than cities and industrial facilities. The Gallery memorandum led some senior leaders in the Air Force to fear that the Navy wanted to take over the strategic bombing mission, but the real agenda for naval aviators was to justify their own existence.

== Cancellation of USS United States ==
Since 1945, the Navy had been working on the design of a new class of aircraft carrier. Its principal proponent was Admiral Marc Mitscher, Radford's predecessor as the DCNO for Air and the skipper of the USS Hornet during the 1942 Doolittle Raid, when USAAF North American B-25 Mitchell bombers were launched from that aircraft carrier. Mitscher proposed the construction of an aircraft carrier that would have been ideal for that mission. He wanted a flush deck so that it could operate 16 to 24 large bombers weighing up to 100,000 pounds (45,000 kg), and carry enough fuel and bombs for 100 sorties to be flown without rearming or refueling. Another advantage of the flush deck was highlighted by the 1946 Operation Crossroads nuclear tests: it was less susceptible to the shock waves produced by a nearby nuclear explosion.

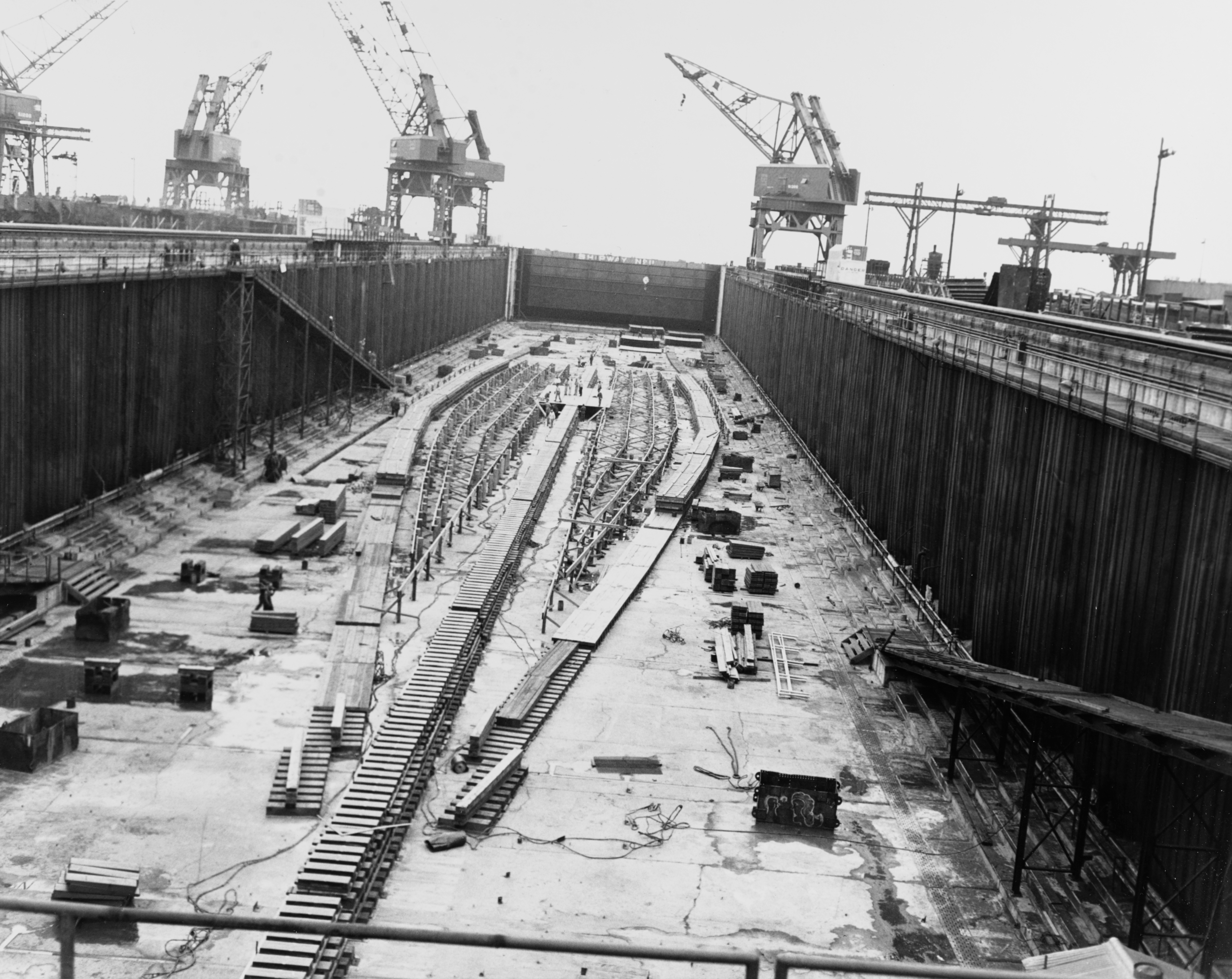
USS United States, pictured in drydock with her keel laid. The cancellation of United States and her sister ships was a major factor in the "Revolt of the Admirals"

The flush deck carrier was given the designation SCB Project 6A. Since the bombers would be too large to fit in a hangar, Mitscher suggested that it be dispensed with, but the designers added a 28-foot (8.5 m) high one so it could also carry 80 McDonnell F2H Banshee jet fighters. They calculated that 24 Douglas A3D Skywarrior bombers would require a flight deck 1,125 feet (343 m) long and 132 feet (40 m) wide; this was reduced to 1,050 by 113 feet (320 by 34 m) so it would fit into the Navy's largest dry docks. It was estimated that a carrier of this size would have a full load displacement of up to 80,000 long tons (81,000 t). Although the proposed 6A carrier was only 100 feet (30 m) longer than the Midways, its size and radical appearance led the media to refer to it as a "supercarrier". The plan was that the Navy's aircraft carriers would operate in four carrier strike groups, each with a 6A, a Midway-class and two Essex-class aircraft carriers (since there were only three Midways, one group would have a third Essex in lieu). Four 6A carriers were therefore slated to be built, with one laid down each year from 1949 to 1952, with all four operational by 1955. The ship's characteristics were approved by Nimitz as CNO on 2 September 1947, and by the acting Secretary of the Navy, W. John Kenney, the following day.

The first 6A represented a $189 million line item (equivalent to $1.97 billion in 2024) in a $14 billion defense budget (equivalent to $146 billion in 2024), and that was inevitably going to attract the attention of the Bureau of the Budget. On 16 December 1947, its director, James E. Webb, stated that he was opposed to the 1949 shipbuilding program due to its cost. Sullivan offered to cancel the battleship USS Kentucky and Large Cruiser USS Hawaii to assure funds for the 6A carrier, and Webb informed Sullivan that he and Truman had accepted the shipbuilding program on that basis on 19 December. The Joint Chiefs' approval was not sought in 1947, because the new unification law had not yet been enacted. In testimony before Congress in May 1948, Sullivan and Denfeld said that the 6A carrier had the approval of the Joint Chiefs, the Secretary of Defense and the President. General Carl Spaatz, the retired Chief of Staff of the Air Force, objected; the Joint Chiefs had never approved it. Forrestal then submitted it to the Joint Chiefs for their approval on 26 May 1948. Leahy, Denfeld and the Chief of Staff of the Army, General Omar N. Bradley, approved it; Vandenberg refused to do so. Congress funded the 6A carrier as part of the shipbuilding program on 24 June 1948, and Forrestal gave his approval on 22 July, giving the first 6A carrier the designation CVA-58, and Truman authorized the shipbuilding program the following day. The keel of the ship, which was named the USS United States, was laid at Newport News, Virginia, on 23 April 1949.

Forrestal did not support Truman's 1948 Presidential campaign; instead, he met with Truman's opponent, Thomas E. Dewey, with whom he discussed the possibility of remaining in cabinet in a Republican administration. Truman was angered by this, and on 2 March 1949, after he won the election, he announced that Forrestal was being replaced by Louis A. Johnson, who had raised $1.5 million for Truman's re-election campaign. On 22 May, Forrestal committed suicide by self-defenestration. Johnson had no qualms over supporting Truman's military budget reductions and fiscally preferred the Air Force's argument. His idea of an executive was someone who gave orders, and those orders were to be carried out immediately and without question. When the naval officers questioned his decisions on weapons and strategy (such as the cancellation of the United States), he took that as a sign of insubordination. When attacks appeared against his character, he wanted those responsible severely punished.

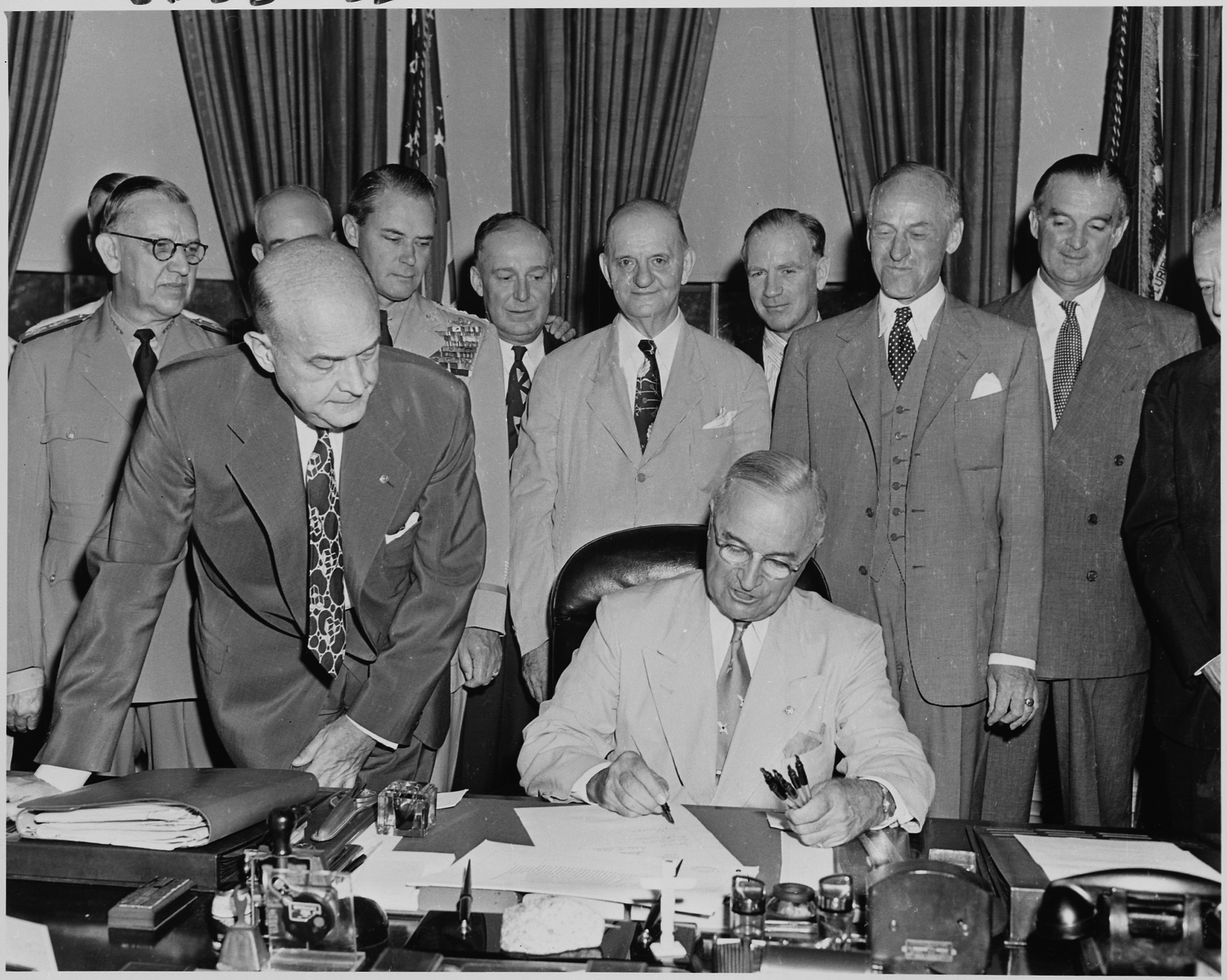
President Truman signs the National Security Act Amendment of 1949, which created the United States Department of Defense. Secretary of Defense Louis A. Johnson leans over the desk. Behind him is Admiral Louis Denfeld, General Omar N. Bradley, and General Hoyt Vandenberg.

Johnson sought the opinions of General of the Army Dwight Eisenhower, the three service secretaries and the Joint Chiefs on the advisability of continuing the construction of the United States. Bradley and Vandenberg urged its cancellation, although Bradley had been in favor of the carrier the previous year. On 23 April 1949 Johnson canceled the United States; Truman concurred with the decision. This vessel was the symbol and hope for the Navy's future, and its cancellation greatly demoralized the service. Sullivan met with Truman on 25 April and submitted his resignation to Johnson the following day. Johnson did not seem disturbed. His decision to cancel United States provided him with economy in the military budget needed to meet his budgetary goals, while demonstrating that he was in firm control of the military and able to make difficult decisions.

To replace Sullivan, Johnson recommended Francis P. Matthews for the position of Secretary of the Navy. A lawyer from Omaha, Nebraska, he had served as a director of the United Service Organizations (USO), a service organization that entertained the troops. He came to the attention of Johnson by assisting him with political fund raising for the 1948 Truman campaign. Matthews admitted the nearest he had come to naval experience was rowing a boat on a lake. He was sworn in on 25 May 1949. Another change that month was the departure of Radford, who became Commander in Chief Pacific (CINCPAC), and was replaced as VCNO by Vice Admiral John D. Price. On 10 August, Truman signed amendments to the National Security Act, which created the new position of Chairman of the Joint Chiefs of Staff, and he appointed Bradley to the position.

A research group, OP-23, a naval intelligence unit formed in December 1948 by Denfeld to advise him on unification and later headed by Captain Arleigh Burke, had been gathering information to help defend the Navy's position, including material critical of the B-36's performance and capabilities. In April 1949 what became known as the Anonymous Document appeared. It pointed out that prior to his posting as Secretary of Defense Johnson had been on the board of directors of Convair, the manufacturer of the B-36 bomber, and was the head of Convair's law firm. The document highlighted his apparent conflict of interest in representing the government with this manufacturer. It went on to claim that the B-36 was a "billion-dollar blunder" and alleged "fraud" on the part of B-36 contractors regarding costs, capabilities and test results. The document was sent to Glenn L. Martin, the chairman of the Glenn L. Martin Company, and several members of Congress.

== Congressional hearings ==
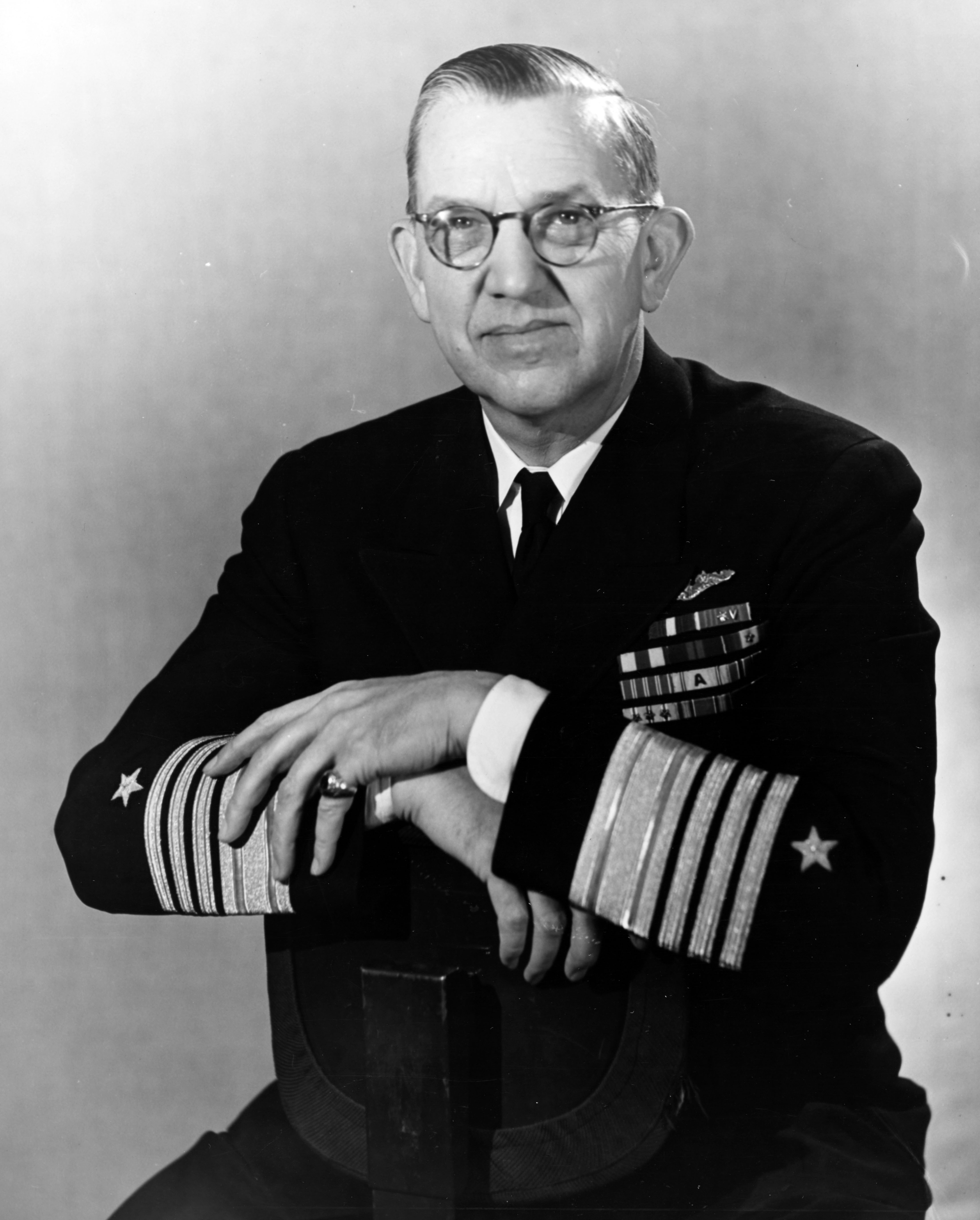
Chief of Naval Operations Admiral Louis Denfeld

At first there was little sign that Congress would conduct an investigation of the Anonymous Document. Senator Millard Tydings, the Chairman of the Senate Armed Service Committee, was a close friend of Martin's, but was wary of the contents of the Anonymous Document. Carl Vinson, the Chairman of the House Armed Services Committee had concerns about the ongoing publicity campaigns of the Navy and Air Force, particularly the leaking of classified information. This included the publication by a United Press reporter, Charles W. Corddry, that the United States was targeting 70 Soviet cities for strategic bombardment. With the influential Tydings unwilling to act, Congressman James Van Zandt introduced a resolution in the House of Representatives on 25 May 1949 calling for an investigation of contract awards and cancellations. Vinson saw this as a challenge to his authority, and on 1 June submitted his own resolution that the House Armed Services Committee be authorized to conduct an investigation into the procurement of the B-36. The House adopted Vinson's resolution on 8 June.

The first phase of the House Armed Services Committee hearing and investigation on "Unification and Strategy" was held from 9 to 25 August 1949. The focus was on the allegations of fraud and corruption emanating from the Anonymous Document. The author of the "anonymous document" was determined to be Cedric R. Worth, a former Navy commander serving as a civilian assistant to Under Secretary of the Navy Dan A. Kimball. Worth was called as a witness and testified before the House Investigating Committee. The committee found no substance to charges of improper interest in aircraft procurement on the part of Johnson or Symington. The Air Force was exonerated of all charges of wrongdoing. At the conclusion, the committee recommended that Worth be fired. Following a naval court of inquiry, Worth was dismissed. The apparent vindication of Secretary Johnson and inappropriate work by Worth was an embarrassment to the Navy.

On hearing word of proposed cuts to the Navy budget, a naval aviator serving on the Joint Staff, Captain John G. Crommelin, called an impromptu press conference in which he claimed that unification had been a mistake, and that Johnson was out to destroy the Navy. Denfeld did not respond directly to Crommelin's remarks, taking the position that naval officers were free to express their personal opinions. Matthews felt differently; he issued a statement to the effect that Crommelin's actions rendered him unfit to continue serving on the Joint Staff. Accordingly, he was transferred to a billet on Denfeld's staff normally held by a rear admiral. Matthews was furious, and Denfeld quickly moved Crommelin to a more junior post. Matthews and Denfeld then issued a guidance memorandum that stated that speeches and articles for public release had to be cleared through the Office of the Secretary of the Navy.

Matthews had requested advice from senior personnel on issues facing the Navy that might come up in hearings, so Bogan, now the Commander of the First Task Fleet in the Pacific, wrote to Matthews on 20 September to inform him of the state of morale in the Navy, which he described as "lower today than at any time since I entered the commissioned ranks in 1916", and he expressed support for Crommelin's views. The letter was confidential, but Radford, as CINCPAC, and Denfeld, as CNO, reviewed the letter as it was routed through official channels to Matthews's office. In his endorsement, Denfeld concurred with the sentiments that Bogan expressed.

A second hearing convened in October focused upon the proposed reduction in the Navy and the cancellation of the United States and the soundness of the proposed expansion of the strategic bomber forces. They were given added urgency by Truman's announcement on 23 September that the Soviet Union had tested its first nuclear device. Matthews announced that no Navy man would be censored or penalized for the testimony he offered at the hearing. This should have been unnecessary, since it was illegal to threaten witnesses testifying before Congress or to take action against them afterwards. Nonetheless, when Vinson opened the hearings on 6 October he declared:

It is the intent of the Committee that all testimony given shall be frankly and freely given and be given without reprisals in the Department of Defense against any individual presenting testimony during the course of these hearings. The committee will not permit nor tolerate any reprisal against any witness in these hearings nor will it permit or tolerate any shepherding of the testimony being presented. We want these witnesses to speak what is in their minds, to put their cards on the table, and to do so without hesitation or personal concern. We are going to the bottom of this unrest and concern in the Navy. And the committee expects full cooperation in this from the Department of Defense.

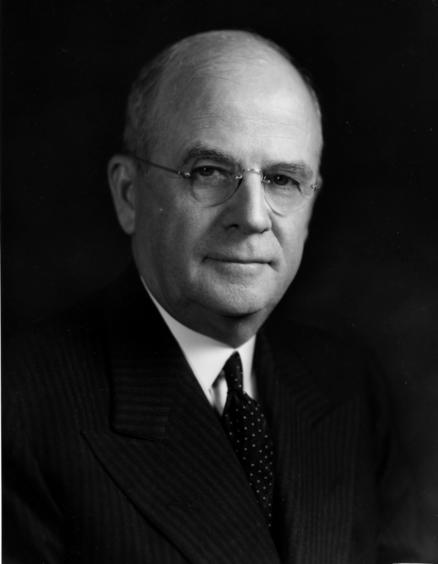
Secretary of the Navy Francis P. Matthews

The naval officers called to testify were expected to support Secretary Matthews, but instead officer after officer arose to testify that the Air Force reliance on the B-36 was inadequate, and that the entire strategy of atomic bombing was immoral and misguided. Among the officers testifying from 6 to 17 October, were the naval leaders of World War II: Fleet Admirals Ernest King, Chester Nimitz and William Halsey, Admirals Raymond Spruance and Thomas Kinkaid, and General Alexander Vandegrift, the former Commandant of the Marine Corps. Burke had run tests which showed the Navy was already in possession of a fighter aircraft, the F2H Banshee, that could reach high enough altitudes to intercept bombers like the B-36, and he knew it would be unreasonable to assume that an opposing major world power would not also have developed such an aircraft. In that case, the B-36 would need to be accompanied with long-range fighter escorts with the requisite range and ceiling to complete its mission, and the Air Force had no such fighter available in their inventory. In his testimony, Denfeld broadly supported the Navy officers who had testified before him.

Symington and Vandenberg rebutted the admirals' testimony, point by point, on 18 and 19 October. Regarding the United States, Vandenberg commented: "I accept the military capability of this ship as stated by the Chief of Naval Operations. My opposition to building it comes from the fact that I can see no necessity for a ship with those capabilities in any strategic plan against the one possible enemy." Symington denied that the Air Force favored the bombing of civilians or that it believed that an atomic blitz offered a "quick, easy and painless war". Vandenberg testified that "Veterans of the Eighth, the Fifteenth, the Twentieth and other historic Air Forces know very well that there are no cheap and easy ways to win great wars." He said that during World War II bombers had always managed to get through to their targets, and that technological improvements since then made it still more likely. He was optimistic in his testimony, although he had reason for concern, having received a memo from Major General Gordon P. Saville that only one B-36 had so far attempted a radar-controlled bombing run from 40,000 feet (12,000 m).

The remainder of the testimony before the House Armed Services Committee was from former President Herbert Hoover, Johnson, and Generals of the Army George C. Marshall, Dwight Eisenhower and Omar Bradley on the merits of unification. Bradley noted that he had participated in the two largest amphibious operations in history, namely the invasions of Sicily and Normandy, and confidently predicted that "large-scale amphibious operations, such as those in Sicily and Normandy, will never occur again". Bradley made no attempt to hide his contempt for the Navy's methods during the case, and he accused senior naval officers of poor leadership and disloyalty:

Our military forces are one team – in the game to win regardless of who carries the ball. This is no time for "fancy dans" who won't hit the line with all they have on every play, unless they can call the signals. Each player on this team – whether he shines in the spotlight of the backfield or eats dirt on the line – must be an all-American.

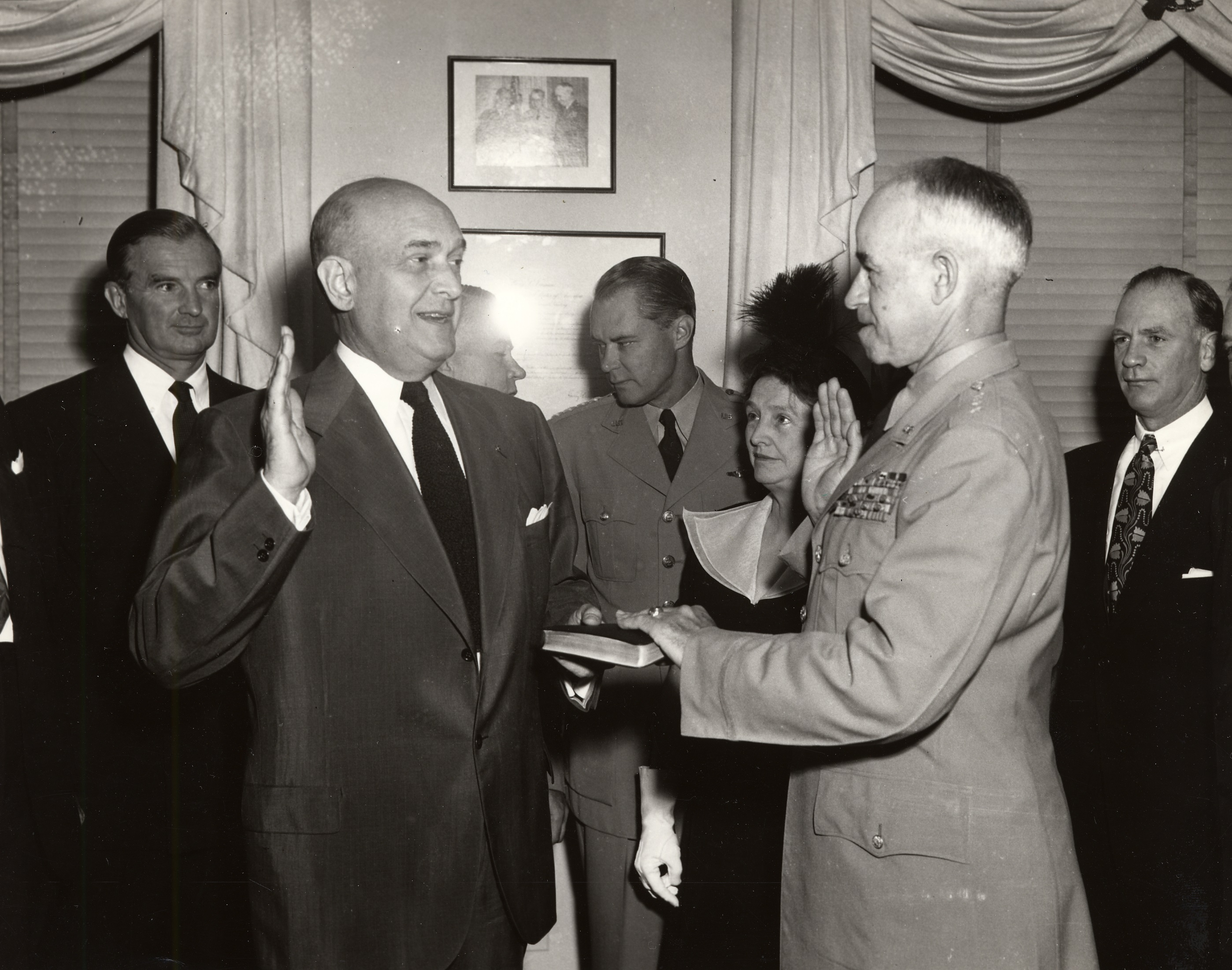
Secretary of Defense Louis A. Johnson swears in General Omar N. Bradley as the first Chairman of the Joint Chiefs of Staff on 16 August 1949

The House Armed Services Committee found a number of actions taken by the administration and by the services involved to be overstepping. It held that evaluation of the B-36's worth was the responsibility of the Weapons Systems Evaluation Group, and that the services jointly should not pass judgment on weapons proposed by one service. On cancellation of the supercarrier, the committee questioned the qualifications of the Army and Air Force chiefs of staff, who had testified in support of Johnson's decision, to determine vessels appropriate for the Navy. In disapproving of Johnson's "summary manner" of terminating the carrier and his failure to consult congressional committees before acting, the committee stated that "national defense is not strictly an executive department undertaking; it involves not only the Congress but the American people as a whole speaking through their Congress. The committee can in no way condone this manner of deciding public questions." The committee expressed solid support for effective unification, but stated that, "there is such a thing as seeking too much unification too fast..." and observed that "...there has been a Navy reluctance in the inter-service marriage, an over-ardent Army, a somewhat exuberant Air Force ... It may well be stated that the committee finds no unification Puritans in [ the Pentagon ]."

During the hearings public opinion shifted strongly against the Navy. Time magazine noted: "Even so staunch a friend of the Navy as the New York Times Annapolis-trained military analyst Hanson Baldwin wrote that he himself did not consider the cutbacks in the Navy program disastrous. Baldwin added dryly: 'Some of the Navy's interest in morality as applied to strategic bombing seems new-found." The whole episode became known as the "Revolt of the Admirals".

== Outcome ==
=== Command changes ===
After the hearings, Secretary Matthews set about punishing those officers who had testified and were still actively serving in the Navy, in defiance of his own public promise not to do so. Denfeld was first to go; he was summarily relieved by Truman on what had been Navy Day, 27 October 1949. Matthews explained that he and Denfeld disagreed widely on strategic policy and unification. Denfeld retained his rank, and was offered the post of Commander in Chief of the Naval Forces in the Eastern Atlantic and Mediterranean, but he declined and elected to retire instead. Matthews selected Sherman as his new CNO. Bogan was given command of Fleet Air at Naval Air Station Jacksonville, a billet normally filled by a rear admiral. He too elected to retire rather than face assignment to a position of lesser authority. Crommelin continued to openly speak out and was forced into retirement by Sherman.

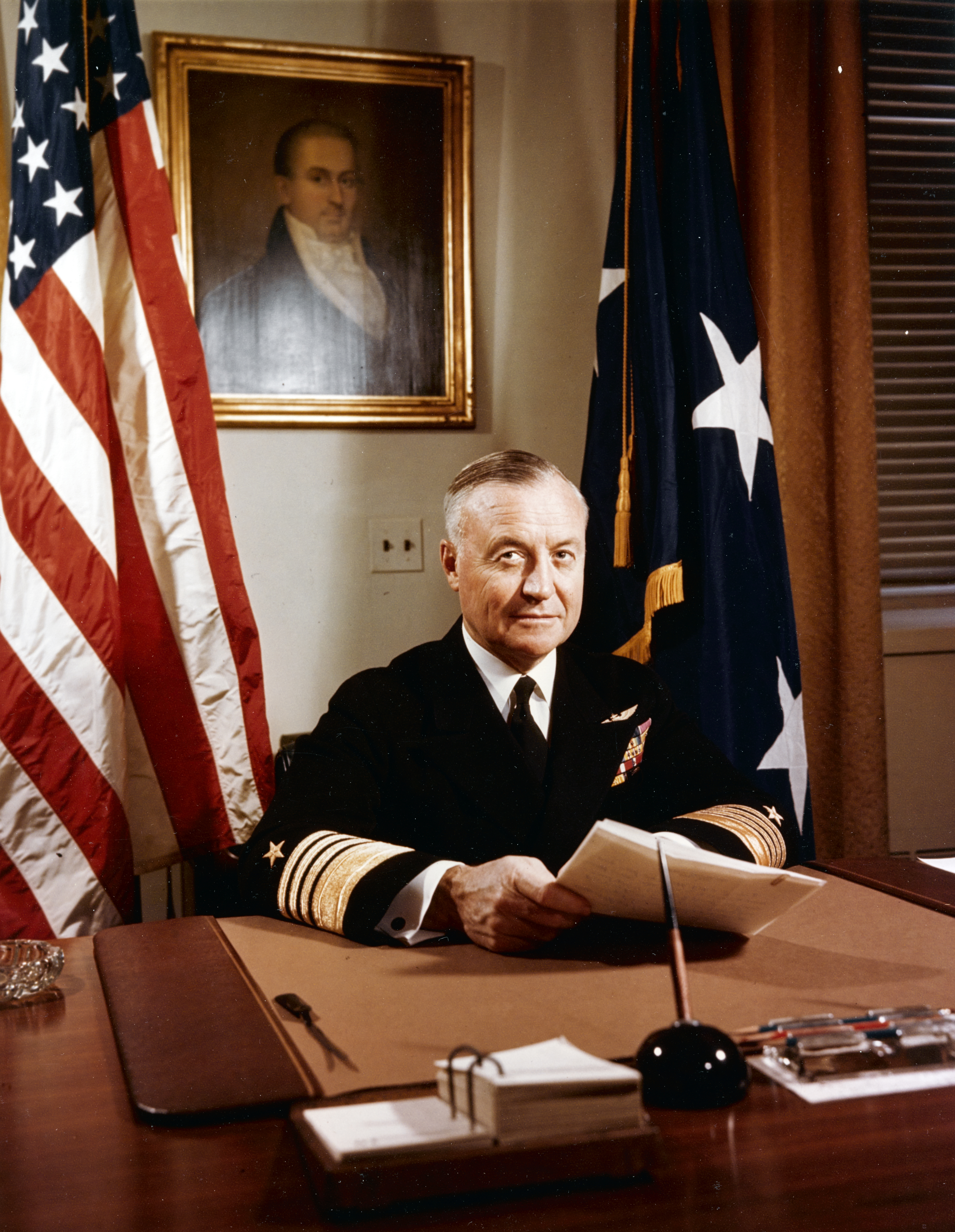
Admiral Forrest Sherman replaced Denfeld as Chief of Naval Operations

One of Sherman's first actions as CNO was to disband OP-23, but not before the Naval Inspector General's office seized all documents in search of evidence tying it to Crommelin's disclosures or breaches of security. Matthews and Johnson attempted to block the promotion of Burke by crossing out his name on the promotion list, but this was seen and reversed by Truman. The House Armed Services Committee condemned Denfeld's dismissal, concluding that:

The removal of Admiral Denfeld was a reprisal against him for giving testimony to the House Armed Services Committee. This act is a blow against effective representative government in that it tends to intimidate witnesses and hence discourages the rendering of free and honest testimony to the Congress; it violated promises made to the witnesses by the Committee, the Secretary of the Navy, and the Secretary of Defense; and it violated the Unification Act, into which a provision was written to specifically prevent actions of this nature against the Nation's highest military and naval officers.

The Truman administration won the conflict with the Navy, and civilian control over the military was reaffirmed. Military budgets following the hearings prioritized the development of Air Force heavy bomber designs. These were deployed across the country and at dozens of overseas bases. Frank Pace, who as Director of the Bureau of the Budget had been a driving force behind defense cuts, was appointed Secretary of the Army, and Leon Keyserling, a Keynesian economist, replaced Edwin Nourse as the chairman of the Council of Economic Advisers when the latter quit over the administration's failure to cut spending.

Johnson authorized the modernisation of two Essex-class aircraft carriers, increasing the Navy's projected aircraft carrier strength in fiscal year 1951 to seven, but a committee he established to look for further economies suggested another $929 million in cuts to the fiscal year 1950 budget, mainly at the expense of the Army and Navy budgets, which were cut by another $357 million and $376 million respectively. While most of Johnson's cuts came at the expense of the Navy, it was the Army that was affected the most. After a year with Johnson at the helm, the Army had lost 100,000 men and only one of its ten divisions was at full strength. Truman still talked about cutting the defense budget to $9 billion. Unwilling to support further cuts that now targeted the tactical arm of the Air Force, Symington submitted his resignation in April 1950.

=== Korean War ===
On 25 June 1950, the Korean War broke out and the administration was forced to confront the crisis with the forces it had on hand. The Truman administration immediately decided not to use the nuclear arsenal, and sought to check the North Korean advance with conventional forces. The war discredited the proponents of austerity and vindicated the hawks that had called for increased defense spending. As an initial response, Truman called for a naval blockade of North Korea, and was shocked to learn that such a blockade could only be imposed "on paper" since, as a result of the budget and force structure cuts he had imposed on the Navy via Johnson and Matthews, the Navy no longer had the warships with which to carry out his request.

Faced with public criticism of his handling of the Korean War, which opened with a series of setbacks and defeats, and wishing to deflect blame from the peacetime defense economy measures he had previously espoused, Truman decided to ask for Johnson's resignation as Secretary of Defense on 19 September 1950. Truman decided he needed a Secretary of Defense that had the confidence of all three services, preferably one with significant military experience, and nominated retired General of the Army George C. Marshall. Matthews resigned as Secretary of the Navy on 31 July 1951 and became the United States Ambassador to Ireland.

The Korean War compelled a reluctant Truman to loosen the purse strings for military funding. The administration did not decide between military and civilian spending; it found that it could afford both. No solution for interservice rivalry or any process for the resolution of competing budgetary claims emerged. Rivalry between the services was not ended; what ended was competition over a zero-sum budget. Defense outlays quadrupled between 1950 and 1953. In fiscal year 1951, the Army had double the manpower called for in Johnson's budget; the Navy increased its carrier force from 15 to 27; and Air Force grew from 48 wings to 87. Fears of inflation proved unfounded; although it increased to 7.9 percent in 1951, it dropped back to below 1 percent the following year. Between 1954 and 2002, annual defense outlays averaged $317.7 billion in 2002 dollars, about 1.5 times the average between 1947 and 1950. Between 1948 and 1986, the Air Force's share of the defense budget was 35 percent, the Navy's 31 percent, and the Army's 28 percent.

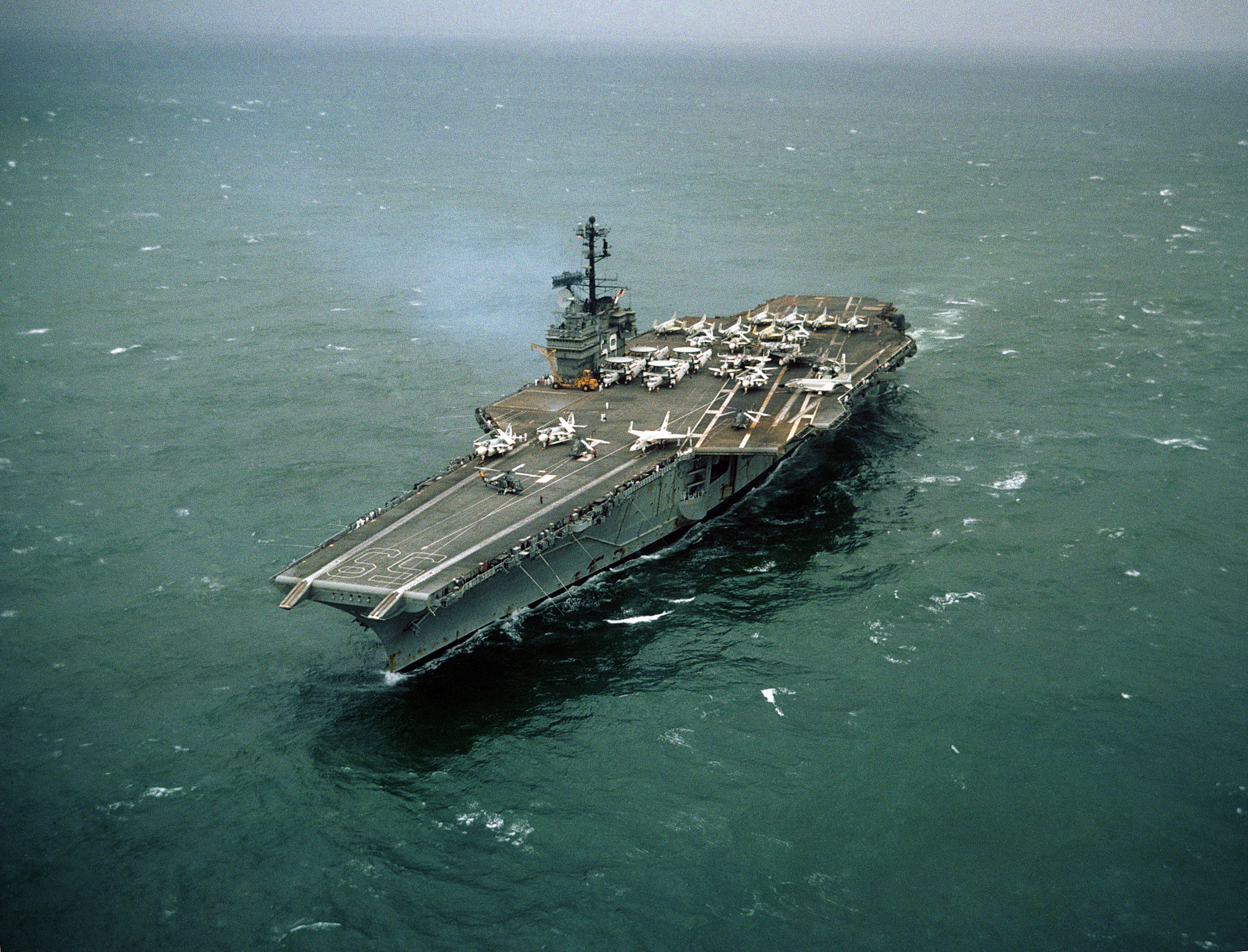
The USS Forrestal, the first of a new class of supercarriers authorized as the Korean War was about to begin

The Navy did get a supercarrier; Johnson approved its construction on 22 June 1950. Launched in October 1955, the USS Forrestal, at 60,000 long tons (61,000 t) was 1.5 times the size of the Midway-class aircraft carriers. She featured an armoured flight deck just large enough and sturdy enough to land a heavy bomber carrying a small nuclear bomb. The ship was also equipped with steam catapults to assist the heavier nuclear bombers in getting airborne. The flight deck was angled, allowing the new carrier to launch and recover aircraft at the same time, while still retaining an island configuration. The AJ Savages were mostly based ashore, as their successors, the carrier-based all-jet A3D Skywarriors came on line. With the development of smaller and lighter nuclear weapons in the late 1950s, it also became possible for them to be carried by other standard Navy attack planes such as the A4D Skyhawk.

== See also ==
- Civilian control of the military
- Thomas F. Connolly § Role in F-14 development for a similar case in which a naval officer gave testimony to Congress in contradiction to administration demands
