= 1954 United States Senate election in Illinois =

- November 2, 1954
- Turnout: 63.69%

| Nominee | Paul Douglas | Joseph T. Meek |
| Party | Democratic | Republican |
| Popular vote | 1,804,338 | 1,563,683 |
| Percentage | 53.57% | 46.43% |
- County results Douglas: 50–60% 60–70% Meeks: 50–60% 60–70% 70–80%
U.S. senator before election
Paul Douglas
Democratic
Elected U.S. Senator
Paul Douglas
Democratic

The United States Senate election in Illinois of 1954 took place on November 2, 1954. Incumbent Democratic United States Senator Paul Douglas was reelected to a second term.

== Background ==
The primary (held on April 13) and general election coincided with those for House and those for state elections.

Turnout in the primaries was 27.07%, with a total of 1,431,554 votes cast. Despite a crowded field for the Republican nomination, the primaries experienced what The New York Times reporter Richard J. H. Johnston referred to as, "one of the lightest primary votes of recent years," in Illinois.

Turnout during the general election was 63.69%, with 3,368,021 votes cast. This election saw fewer votes cast than were cast in either of the two coinciding races for statewide executive offices in Illinois.

== Democratic primary ==
Incumbent Paul Douglas was renominated, running unopposed.

=== Candidates ===
- Paul Douglas, incumbent U.S. Senator

=== Results ===
Democratic primary results
| Party | Candidate | Votes | % |
|---|---|---|---|
| Democratic | Paul H. Douglas (incumbent) | 587,084 | 100 |
| Write-in | | 5 | 0.00 |
| Total votes | | 587,089 | 100 |

== Republican primary ==
Joseph T. Meek won a crowded Republican primary.

=== Candidates ===
- John B. Crane
- Edgar M. Elbert, businessman and President of Lions Club International
- Lawrence Daly, perennial candidate
- Herbert F. Geisler, Chicago alderman
- Edward A. Hayes, former Commander of The American Legion
- Julius Klein, business executive, journalist, former spy and former United States Army general
- Park Livingston, Trustee of University of Illinois and 1952 Illinois gubernatorial candidate
- Joseph T. Meek, President of the Illinois Federation of Retail Associations
- Deneen A. Watson
- Austin L. Wyman, attorney

=== Results ===
Republican primary results
| Party | Candidate | Votes | % |
|---|---|---|---|
| Republican | Joseph T. Meek | 283,843 | 33.61 |
| Republican | Edward A. Hayes | 181,490 | 21.49 |
| Republican | Austin L. Wyman | 103,202 | 12.22 |
| Republican | Park Livingston | 74,965 | 8.48 |
| Republican | John B. Crane | 56,086 | 6.64 |
| Republican | Julius Klein | 48,764 | 5.78 |
| Republican | Edgar M. Elbert | 31,420 | 3.72 |
| Republican | Herbert F. Geisler | 27,563 | 3.26 |
| Republican | Lar "America First" Daly | 18,585 | 2.20 |
| Republican | Deenen A. Watson | 18,496 | 2.19 |
| Write-in | | 51 | 0.01 |
| Total votes | | 844,465 | 100 |

== General election ==
=== Results ===
United States Senate election in Illinois, 1966
| Party | Candidate | Votes | % |
|---|---|---|---|
| Democratic | Paul H. Douglas (incumbent) | 1,804,338 | 53.57 |
| Republican | Joseph T. Meek | 1,563,683 | 46.43 |
| Total votes | | 3,368,021 | 100 |

== See also ==
- United States Senate elections, 1954
