= Louis A. Johnson =

American politician (1891–1966)

Louis Johnson
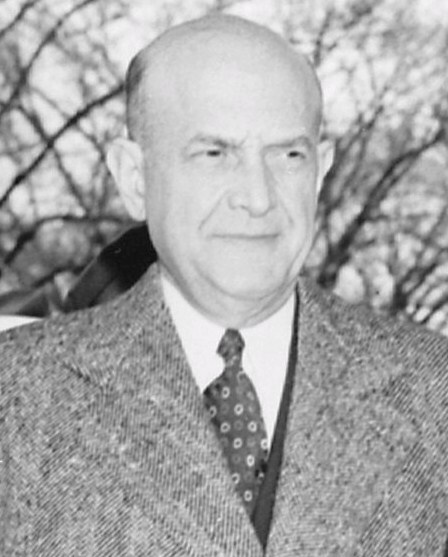
- Johnson in 1949

2nd United States Secretary of Defense
- In office March 28, 1949 – September 19, 1950
- President: Harry S. Truman
- Preceded by: James Forrestal
- Succeeded by: George C. Marshall

United States Assistant Secretary of War
- In office 28 June 1937 – 25 July 1940
- President: Franklin D. Roosevelt
- Preceded by: Harry Hines Woodring
- Succeeded by: Robert P. Patterson

Personal details
- Born: Louis Arthur Johnson; January 10, 1891 Roanoke, Virginia, U.S.
- Died: April 24, 1966 (aged 75) Washington, D.C., U.S.
- Party: Democratic
- Spouse: Ruth Maxwell (m. 1920)
- Children: 2
- Education: University of Virginia (LLB)
- Civilian awards: Medal for Merit

Military service
- Branch: United States Army
- Years of service: 1917–1919
- Rank: Lieutenant Colonel
- Unit: 305th Ammunition Train, 80th Division; 397th Infantry, 95th Division
- Battles: World War I; Meuse-Argonne; Defensive Sector
- Military awards: Legion of Honour; World War I Victory Medal

Louis Arthur Johnson (January 10, 1891 – April 24, 1966) was an American politician and attorney who served as the second United States secretary of defense from 1949 to 1950. He was the assistant secretary of war from 1937 to 1940 and the 15th national commander of the American Legion from 1932 to 1933.

== Early life ==
Johnson was born on January 10, 1891, in Roanoke, Virginia, to Marcellus and Catherine (née Arthur) Johnson. He earned a law degree from the University of Virginia. After graduation, he practiced law in Clarksburg, West Virginia; his firm, Steptoe & Johnson eventually opened offices in Charleston, West Virginia, and Washington, DC Elected to the West Virginia House of Delegates in 1916, he served as majority floor leader and chairman of the Judiciary Committee. During World War I, Johnson saw action as an Army captain in France, where he compiled a long report to the War Department on Army management and materiel requisition practices. After the war, he resumed his law practice, was active in veterans' affairs, and served as National Commander of the American Legion.

== Assistant Secretary of War, 1937–40 ==
As Assistant Secretary of War from 1937 to 1940, Johnson advocated universal military education and training, rearmament, and expansion of military aviation. He feuded with the isolationist Secretary of War Harry Hines Woodring over military aid to Britain. In mid-1940, after Woodring had resigned and the fall of France had revealed the precarious state of the nation's defenses, Franklin D. Roosevelt bypassed Johnson for the position of Secretary of War, instead choosing Henry Stimson.

Having aspired to the position of Secretary, which he felt he had earned, Johnson felt betrayed by Roosevelt. During the war, Johnson had no major responsibilities within the government involving military matters, but he agreed to participate in the Roosevelt administration's war mobilization of US industry. Later, he served as Alien Property custodian for the American operations of the German chemical giant I. G. Farben. In 1942, Johnson briefly served as the president's personal representative in India, until an intestinal illness caused him to resign his post and return to the United States.

== Secretary of Defense ==
In the 1948 presidential campaign, Johnson was chief fundraiser for President Harry S. Truman's election campaign; the money raised by Johnson proved crucial to Truman's come-from-behind victory in the November elections. As a regular visitor to the White House, Johnson not only continued to express an interest in defense matters, but actively campaigned for the post of secretary of defense. He was also a staunch supporter of Truman's desire to 'hold the line' on defense spending. After a series of conflicts with Defense Secretary James V. Forrestal over defense budget cutbacks, Truman asked for Forrestal's resignation, replacing him with Johnson early in 1949.

=== Defense budget reductions ===
Secretary Johnson entered office sharing the president's commitment to achieve further military unification and to drastically reduce budget expenditures on defense in favor of other government programs. As one of Truman's staunchest political supporters, Johnson was viewed by Truman as the ideal candidate to push Truman's defense budget economization policy in the face of continued resistance by the Department of Defense and the armed forces.

According to historian Walter LaFeber, Truman was known to approach defense budgetary requests in the abstract, without regard to defense response requirements in the event of conflicts with potential enemies. Truman would begin by subtracting from total receipts the amount needed for domestic needs and recurrent operating costs, with any surplus going to the defense budget for that year. From the beginning, Johnson and Truman assumed that the United States' monopoly on the atomic bomb was adequate protection against any and all external threats. Johnson's unwillingness to budget conventional readiness needs for the Army, Navy or Marine Corps soon caused fierce controversies within the upper ranks of the armed forces. From fiscal year 1948 onwards, the defense department budget was capped at the amount set in FY 1947 ($14.4 billion), and was progressively reduced in succeeding fiscal years until January 1950, when it was reduced yet again to $13.5 billion.

Johnson was also an advocate of defense unification, which he saw as a means to further reduce defense spending requirements. At a press conference the day after he took office, Johnson promised a drastic cut in the number of National Military Establishment boards, committees, and commissions, and added, "To the limit the present law allows, I promise you there will be unification as rapidly as the efficiency of the service permits it." Later, in one of his frequent speeches on unification, Johnson stated that "this nation can no longer tolerate the autonomous conduct of any single service ... a waste of the resources of America in spendthrift defense is an invitation to disaster for America."

To ensure congressional approval of proposed DOD budget requests, both Truman and Johnson demanded public acquiescence, if not outright support, from the Joint Chiefs of Staff (JCS) and other military department commanders when making public statements or testifying before Congress. In 1948, then-Army Chief of Staff General Omar Bradley stated that "the Army of 1948 could not fight its way out of a paper bag." Yet the following year, after becoming Chairman of the JCS under Johnson, Bradley reversed course and publicly supported Johnson's decisions, telling Congress that he would be doing a "disservice to the nation" if he asked for a larger military force. General J. Lawton Collins went even further when testifying before a House Appropriations committee, stating that Truman administration reductions in Army force levels made it more effective.

Johnson promptly began proposing mothballing or scrapping much of the Navy's conventional surface fleet and amphibious forces. Shortly after his appointment, Johnson had a conversation with Admiral Richard L. Conolly that revealed his attitudes towards the US Navy and US Marine Corps and any need for non-nuclear forces:

Admiral, the Navy is on its way out. There's no reason for having a Navy and a Marine Corps. General Bradley tells me amphibious operations are a thing of the past. We'll never have any more amphibious operations. That does away with the Marine Corps. And the Air Force can do anything the Navy can do, so that does away with the Navy.

Both Truman and Johnson extended their opposition to the Navy in their treatment of the US Marine Corps. Truman had a well-known dislike of the Marines from his Army service in World War I and would say in August 1950, "The Marine Corps is the Navy's police force and as long as I am President that is what it will remain. They have a propaganda machine that is almost equal to Stalin's." Johnson exploited this ill feeling of Truman's to reduce or eliminate many Marine Corps' budget requests. Johnson attempted to eliminate Marine Corps aviation by transferring its air assets to other services and proposed to progressively eliminate the Marine Corps altogether in a series of budget cutbacks and decommissioning of forces. Johnson ordered that the highest-ranking Marine officer, the Commandant of the Marine Corps, be deleted from the official roll of chiefs of service branches authorized a driver and limousine, and for whom a special gun salute was prescribed on ceremonial occasions. He further specified that there would be no future official recognition or celebration of the Marine Corps birthday. More ominously, Johnson barred the Commandant of the Marine Corps from attending JCS meetings in his role of chief of service (including meetings involving Marine readiness or deployments).

Johnson welcomed the passage of the 1949 amendments to the National Security Act of 1947, telling an American Legion convention that he was "happy to report ... that 80 percent of the problems that beset unification immediately disappeared when the President signed the bill increasing the authority and the responsibility of the Secretary of Defense." Believing that the amendments would help him achieve additional budget cuts, Johnson estimated that one year after their passage the Defense Department would be achieving savings at the rate of $1 billion per year (he later claimed that he had attained this goal). One of his slogans was that the taxpayer was going to get "a dollar's worth of defense for every dollar spent" by the Pentagon, an approach that Truman approved.

Johnson did not limit his budget-cutting campaign to the Navy or Marine Corps. Johnson ordered nearly all of the Army inventories of surplus World War II tanks, communications equipment, personnel carriers and small arms be scrapped or sold off to other countries instead of being shipped to ordnance and storage depots for reconditioning and storage. Johnson even resisted budget requests for reserve stockpiles of small arms and anti-tank ammunition, anti-tank weapons, or amphibious infantry training for the Army's newly acquired ex-Navy landing craft, which promptly began to deteriorate from lack of proper maintenance. Though the United States Air Force (USAF) faced fewer program cancellations and cuts, Johnson refused USAF requests for a doubling of active air groups until the invasion of Korea and favored reduction of tactical air force readiness in favor of the strategic nuclear bomber forces.

=== Revolt of the Admirals ===
Johnson's defense cuts, which began on April 23, 1949, were accelerated after he announced the cancellation of the 65,000-ton flushdeck aircraft carrier USS United States. The Navy had been planning the ship for several years and construction had already begun. Johnson, supported by a slim majority of the JCS and by Truman, stressed the need to cut costs. At least by implication, Johnson had scuttled the Navy's hope to participate in strategic nuclear air operations through use of the carrier. Neither the Department of the Navy nor Congress had been consulted in the termination of United States. Abruptly resigning, Secretary of the Navy John L. Sullivan expressed concern about the future of the US Marine Corps and both Marine and Navy aviation and Johnson's determination to eliminate those services through progressive program cuts.

Faced with such large-scale budgetary reductions, competition between the service branches for remaining defense funds grew increasingly acrimonious. The cancelation of the supercarrier precipitated a bitter controversy between the Navy and the USAF, the so-called "Revolt of the Admirals." In congressional hearings and other public arenas, the Navy reacted angrily to Johnson's action by openly questioning the ability of the Air Force's latest strategic bomber, the Convair B-36, to penetrate Soviet airspace. The USAF countered with data supporting the B-36 and minimized the importance of a naval role for surface ships in future major conflicts.

Subsequently, declassified material proved the USAF to be technically correct in its immediate assessment of the capabilities of the B-36 at the time of the Revolt of the Admirals. At the time, it was indeed virtually invulnerable to interception due to the great height at which it flew. However, the B-36 was a pre-World War II design and by the time it was actually operational and fully deployed to Air Force active duty bombardment wings and bombardment squadrons, the B-36 was hopelessly vulnerable to modern Soviet MiG-15 jet interceptors, aircraft that would greatly surprise US officials when they later appeared over North Korea. Once engaged in the conflict in Korea that would evolve into the Korean War, the role of USAF heavy bombers evolved into an extension of their role during World War II, support of in-theater tactical ground forces. The USAF heavy bomber aircraft employed was the B-29 Superfortress of the Second World War, and the B-36 would see no combat in Korea.

In the long run, Navy arguments for the supercarrier prevailed, though not for the reasons originally cited. A relative failure as a strategic nuclear deterrent, the large aircraft carrier would prove invaluable as an element of conventional rapid deployment tactical air forces, requiring neither overflight permissions or overseas basing rights with host nations. The successors to the canceled supercarrier, the new Forrestal-class aircraft carriers, and later designs, continue in service with the US Navy into the 21st century, forming the core of its offensive striking power.

However, a more ominous (if less publicized) development than the supercarrier debate was Johnson's steady reduction of force in Navy ships, landing craft, and equipment needed for conventional force readiness. Ship after ship was mothballed from the fleet for lack of operating funds. The US Navy and Marine Corps, which had been the world's preeminent amphibious force just a few years earlier, lost most of its amphibious capabilities and landing craft which were scrapped or sold as surplus (the remaining craft were reserved solely for Army use in amphibious operations exercises, which did not utilize them in that role). To cheaply rectify the issue, Johnson oversaw the unpopular seizure of the ocean liner SS United States to convert her to a troop transport. The move further alienated naval-related elements of the US Government, including the shipyard, naval designers, Maritime Commission, and the press. This was the second time Johnson intervened with the shipyard, as the cancelation of the aircraft carrier United States allowed the ocean liner of the same name to begin construction in the same drydock.

=== House investigation ===
In June 1949, the House Committee on Armed Services launched an investigation into charges, emanating unofficially from Navy sources, of malfeasance in office against Johnson and Secretary of the Air Force W. Stuart Symington. The hearings also looked into the capability of the B-36, the cancellation of the supercarrier United States and JCS procedures on weapons development, and ultimately examined the whole course of unification. In addition to disparaging the B-36, Navy representatives questioned the current US military plan for immediate use of atomic weapons against large urban areas when a war started. The Navy argued that such an approach would not harm military targets, and that tactical air power, ground troops and sea power were the elements necessary to defend the United States and Europe against attack. The USAF countered that atomic weapons and long-range strategic bombers would deter war, but that if war nevertheless broke out, an immediate atomic offensive against the enemy would contribute to the success of surface actions and reduce US casualties. Strategic bombing, the USAF contended, provided the major counterbalance to the Soviet Union's vastly superior ground forces.

In its final report, the House Armed Services Committee found no substance to the charges relating to Johnson's and Symington's roles in aircraft procurement. It held that evaluation of the B-36's worth was the responsibility of the Weapons Systems Evaluation Group and that the services jointly should not pass judgment on weapons proposed by one service. On the cancelation of the supercarrier, the committee questioned the qualifications of the Army and Air Force chiefs of staff, who had testified in support of Johnson's decision, to determine vessels appropriate for the Navy. The committee, disapproving of Johnson's "summary manner" of terminating the carrier and failure to consult congressional committees before acting, stated that "national defense is not strictly an executive department undertaking; it involves not only the Congress but the American people as a whole speaking through their Congress. The committee can in no way condone this manner of deciding public questions."

The committee expressed solid support for effective unification, but stated that "there is such a thing as seeking too much unification too fast" and observed that "there has been a Navy reluctance in the interservice marriage, an over-ardent Army, a somewhat exuberant Air Force.... It may well be stated that the committee finds no unification Puritans in the Pentagon."

Finally, the committee condemned the dismissal of Admiral Louis E. Denfeld, the Chief of Naval Operations, who accepted cancellation of the supercarrier but testified critically on defense planning and administration of unification. Secretary of the Navy Francis P. Matthews fired Denfeld on October 27, 1949, explaining that he and Denfeld disagreed widely on strategic policy and unification. The House Armed Services Committee concluded that Denfeld's removal by Matthews was a reprisal because of Denfield's testimony and a challenge to effective representative government. Matthews's perceived vindictiveness towards much of the Navy's uniformed senior leadership during his tenure led to a perception by both the public and the Congress of the Navy's civilian leadership woes, a perception that also did not go totally unnoticed by the news media of the period. As The Washington Daily News reported at the time, "Secretary of the Navy Matthews does not have the confidence of the Navy and can not win it.... Moreover, Mr. Matthews has forfeited the confidence of Congress by firing Admiral Denfeld."

Less than two years after the congressional hearings, and under pressure from the Truman administration to resign as SECNAV due to a radically changed national defense and budgetary environment in view of the onset of the Korean War, Matthews resigned as Secretary of the Navy in July 1951 to become Ambassador to Ireland.

Although Johnson emerged from the Revolt of the Admirals with his reputation intact, the controversy weakened his position with the services and probably with the President. Notwithstanding Johnson's emphasis on unification, it was debatable how far it had really progressed, given the bitter recriminations exchanged by the Air Force and the Navy during the controversy, which went far beyond the initial question of the supercarrier to more fundamental issues of strategic doctrine, service roles and missions, and the authority of the secretary of defense. Moreover, Johnson's ill-conceived budget cutbacks on force readiness would soon bear bitter fruit with the coming of the Korean War. Most historians attribute Johnson's efforts to significantly reduce, if not eliminate, US naval aviation in both the Navy and Marine Corps as one of the important factors in bringing about the invasion of South Korea, supported by both China and the Soviet Union. After the initial onslaught on to the Korean peninsula by North Korean forces, no air bases on the Korean peninsula were available for the USAF to fight back from. As a result, all air support during those disastrous months came from USS Valley Forge, the only aircraft carrier left in the Western Pacific when South Korea was invaded. Valley Forge was soon joined by the other two aircraft carriers remaining in the Pacific.

=== Cold War ===
Momentous international events that demanded difficult national security decisions also marked Johnson's term. The Berlin Crisis ended in May 1949, when the Soviets lifted the blockade. Johnson pointed to the Berlin Airlift as a technological triumph important to the future of air cargo transportation and as an example of the fruits of unification. A week after Johnson took office, the United States and 11 other nations signed the North Atlantic Treaty, creating a regional organization that became the heart of a comprehensive collective security system. After initial reservations, Johnson supported the new alliance and the program of military assistance for NATO and other US allies, which was instituted by the Mutual Defense Assistance Act (1949).

=== NSC 68 ===
In August 1949, earlier than US intelligence analysts had expected, the Soviet Union tested its first atomic device. That event and the almost-concurrent retreat of the Kuomintang regime from Mainland China hastened debate within the administration as to whether the United States should develop a hydrogen bomb. Initially, Johnson suspected, despite confirming air sample, that the Soviets had not really tested an atomic device at all. He theorized that perhaps an accidental laboratory explosion had occurred and that no reassessments of US defense capabilities were needed.

Concluding that the hydrogen bomb was now required as deterrent as well as an offensive weapon, on January 31, 1950, Truman decided to proceed with development, which was supported by Johnson. Meanwhile, Truman directed the Secretaries of State and Defense to review and to reassess US national security policy in the light of the Soviet atomic explosion, the Chinese Communist victory in the Chinese Civil War, and the acquisition of the hydrogen bomb and to produce a paper based on their new analysis. Johnson went about that task reluctantly, as he had promised Truman that he would hold the line on increased defense spending. Johnson was also upset that the State Department had first taken the lead on the policy assessment and had heavily influenced the contents of the resultant report NSC 68.

Truman was less than enthusiastic about the large defense cost projections for NSC 68 and its implications for existing domestic budgetary spending priorities, and initially sent it back without comment to its authors for further analysis. Although Truman took no immediate formal action on NSC 68, the paper gained considerable support when North Korea invaded South Korea. Johnson's obstinate attitude toward the State Department's role in the preparation of the paper adversely affected his relations with both Secretary of State Dean Acheson and Truman. Johnson publicly professed belief that "the advance guard in the campaign for peace that America wages today must be the State Department," but his disagreements with Acheson and his restrictions on Defense Department contacts with the State Department persisted until the realities of the Korean War caused his fall from favor with the White House.

=== Failure in Korea ===
By 1950, Johnson had established a policy of faithfully following Truman's defense economization policy and had aggressively attempted to implement it even in the face of steadily increasing external threats posed by the Soviet Union and its allied Communist regimes. He consequently received much of the blame for the initial setbacks in Korea and the widespread reports of ill-equipped and inadequately trained US military forces. Johnson's failure to plan adequately for US conventional force commitments, to train and equip current forces adequately, or even to budget funds for storage of surplus Army and Navy war materiel for future use in the event of conflict would prove fateful after the Korean War had started.

Ironically, only the US Marine Corps, whose commanders had stored and maintained their World War II surplus inventories of equipment and weapons, proved ready for deployment though they still were woefully under-strength and in need of suitable landing craft to practice amphibious operations (Johnson had transferred most of the remaining craft from the Navy and reserved them for use in training Army units). As US and South Korean forces lacked sufficient armor and artillery to repel the North Korean forces, Army and Marine Corps ground troops were instead committed to a series of costly rearguard actions as the enemy steadily progressed down the Korean Peninsula and eventually encircled Busan.

The impact of the Korean War on Johnson's defense planning was glaringly evident in the Defense Department's original and supplemental budgetary requests for fiscal year 1951 in which Johnson had at first supported Truman's recommendation of a $13.3 billion defense budget. However, a month after the Korean War had started, the secretary hastily proposed a supplemental appropriation request of $10.5 billion (an increase of 79%), which brought the total requested to $23.8 billion. In making the additional request, Johnson informed a House appropriations subcommittee that "in light of the actual fighting that is now in progress, we have reached the point where the military considerations clearly outweigh the fiscal considerations."

The US reverses in Korea and the continued priority accorded to European security resulted in rapid, substantive changes in US defense policies, including a long-term expansion of the armed forces and increased emphasis on military assistance to US allies. In addition, Truman recoiled from Johnson's "inordinate egotistical desire to run the whole government." Truman later noted how Johnson had "offended every member of the cabinet... He never missed an opportunity to say mean things about my personal staff." Finally, concerned about public criticism of his handling of the Korean War, Truman decided to ask for Johnson's resignation. On September 19, 1950, Johnson resigned as Secretary of Defense, and Truman quickly replaced him with General of the Army George C. Marshall.

== Later years ==
His political career at an end, Johnson returned to his law practice, which he pursued until his death from a stroke in 1966 in Washington, DC, at the age of 75. He is buried at the Elkview Masonic Cemetery in Clarksburg, West Virginia. He was survived by his wife, Ruth Frances Maxwell Johnson and daughters Lillian and Katherine.

In his last speech as Secretary of Defense, the day before he left office, Johnson made a reference to William Shakespeare's Macbeth: "When the hurly burly's done and the battle is won, I trust the historian will find my record of performance creditable, my services honest and faithful commensurate with the trust that was placed in me and in the best interests of peace and our national defense."

On December 7, 1950, The Louis A. Johnson VA Medical Center was dedicated in honor of Johnson. The medical center rests on a 16-acre site adjacent to the Veterans Memorial Park and the West Virginia State Nursing Home in the city of Clarksburg, West Virginia. This medical center has been an active teaching facility since 1960 by participating in residency and academic affiliations with West Virginia University, Fairmont State University, Alderson-Broaddus College, and other nearby institutions of higher education.

== See also ==
- List of members of the American Legion
- List of United States secretaries of defense

Non-profit organization positions
Preceded by Henry Stevens	National Commander of the American Legion; 1932–1933	Succeeded by Edward A. Hayes
Political offices
Preceded by James V. Forrestal	United States Secretary of Defense; 1949–1950	Succeeded by George C. Marshall
