= Political activity of the Knights of Columbus =

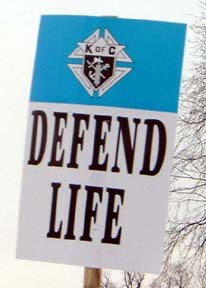
One of the placards handed out by the Knights of Columbus placards at the March For Life in Washington D.C.

The political activity of the Knights of Columbus deals with the involvement of the fraternal order in efforts to influence public policy.

The Knights of Columbus has played an active role in politics ever since its formation. In the years following the Second Vatican Council in the 1960s, the earlier focus on protesting discrimination against Catholics shifted to more activity to promote social issues.

During much of the 20th century and particularly during the era of the Cold War, the Order was politically active in opposing anarchism, communism and socialism, especially within the United States. It was also supportive of trade unionism, the protection of civil rights, and efforts to address racism.

More recently, it has taken an active stance on social issues and causes, supporting religious freedom and opposing efforts to introduce or promote same-sex marriage, abortion, and mandates that require employers to pay for artificial birth control, even if they violate their religious beliefs. The Order has also taken an interest in the rights of immigrants and refugees, especially those immigrants and refugees who come from Catholic-majority countries.

== Background ==
The Knights of Columbus were politically active from an early date. In the years following the Second Vatican Council, however, according to Christopher Kauffman, the Catholic anti-defamation character of the order began to diminish as Catholics became more accepted, and the leadership of the order attempted to stimulate the order's membership to become more aware of the religious and moral issues which the Church was confronting. That led to the creation of a "variety of new programs which reflected the proliferation of the new social ministries of the church."

The Knights of Columbus is classified as a 501(c)(8) fraternal benefit society by the IRS. Unlike the more common 501(c)(3) nonprofits, 501(c)(8)s are allowed to engage in limited direct political activities without jeopardizing their tax exempt status. However, Supreme Knight Carl A. Anderson has said "One of our most important traditions throughout our 125-year history is that we do not, as an organization, become involved in partisan politics."

=== Political philosophy ===
As a non-profit charitable organization, the order is legally prohibited from endorsing political candidates in the United States, but it is permitted to engage in issue-specific political campaigns. Its political activities are therefore limited to such campaigns, the campaigns typically deal with issues that touch upon Catholic social teaching or insurance issues. Kauffman has described the Knights as "progressive on social issues but conservative on cultural issues," positions that are "a reflection of those expressed by the papacy and the majority of the American hierarchy."

At the 1968 Supreme Convention, Supreme Knight John W. McDevitt posed the question of whether the Knights were conservative or liberal. He answered by saying that the order was "both progressive and conservative and we are neither." The Knights' progressive credentials were rooted in their "efforts to shake the country free from any prejudice ... to create conditions which will give every American a chance to obtain decent money ... to eliminate poverty ... [and to foster] interreligious dialogue and interracial understanding." Their conservative efforts consisted of their promotion of a Judeo-Christian morality, anti-secularism, patriotism, and their loyalty to the pope and the bishops.

=== Leadership ===
At times, the leadership of the order has been both liberal and conservative. Martin H. Carmody and Luke E. Hart were both political conservatives, but John J. Phelan was a Democratic politician prior to becoming Supreme Knight, John Swift's "strong support for economic democracy and social-welfare legislation marks him as a fairly representative New Deal anti-communist," and Francis P. Matthews was a civil rights official and a member of Harry Truman's cabinet. Anderson previously served in the Office of Public Liaison under Ronald Reagan.

== Military and war ==
=== Spanish–American War and American imperialism ===
The Order supported the entrance of the United States into the Spanish–American War. They were critical of the era of American imperialism that followed.

=== First World War ===
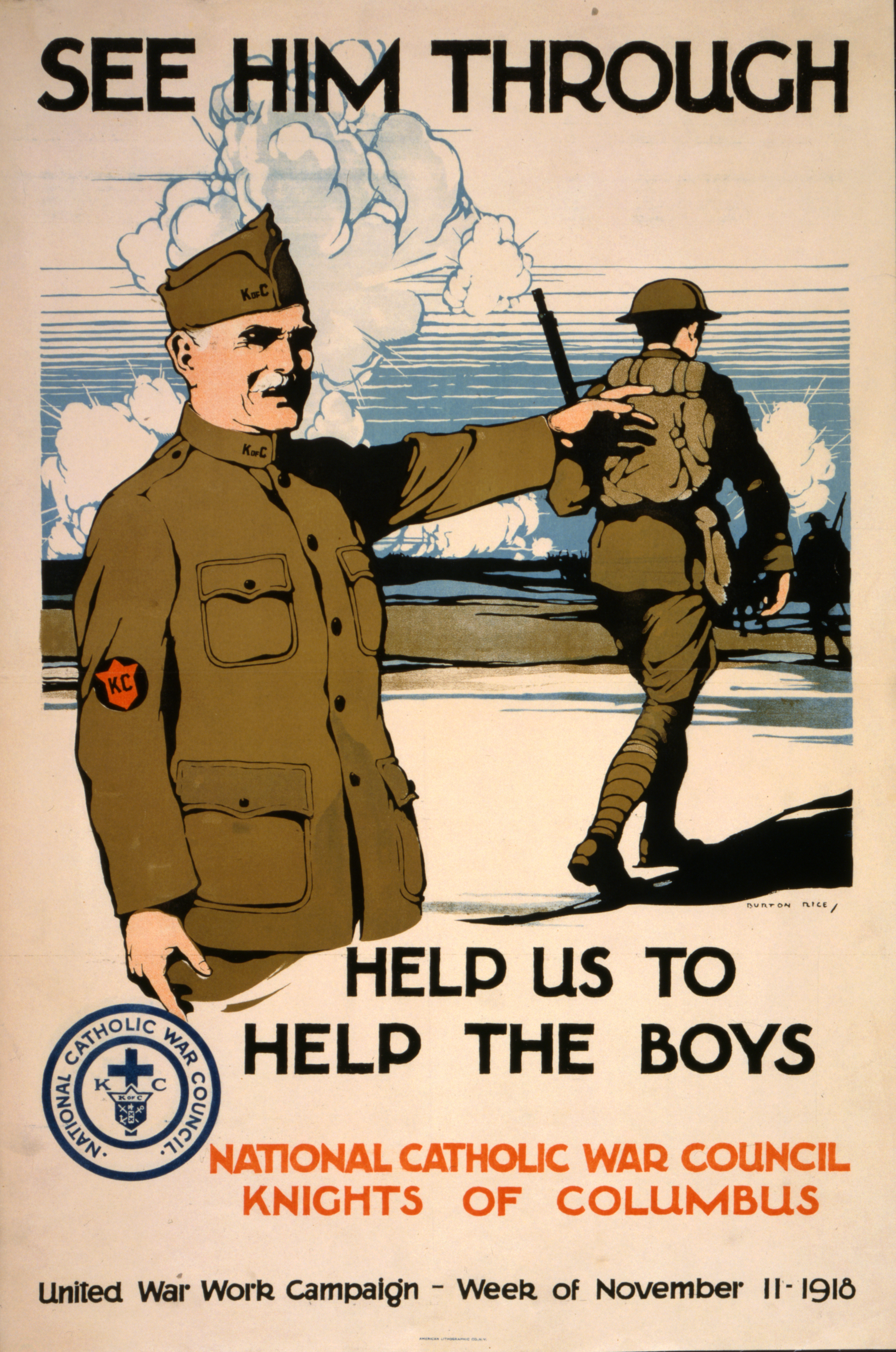
A Knights of Columbus poster from WWI

On 14 April 1917, soon after the United States entered World War I, the board of directors of the Knights passed a resolution which called "for the active cooperation and patriotic zeal" of its members as part of the US war effort. The Order subsequently instituted a per capita tax on the membership to raise $1 million to provide for the welfare of troops fighting in Europe. Local councils also undertook their own fundraising drives which resulted in an additional $14 million. Canadian knights took up the cause even earlier, reflecting their closer links to Britain.

In 1918, just before the war ended, the Knights joined other organizations which were raising funds to support the welfare of the troops, both in the US and overseas, which along with the contribution by the National Catholic War Council, totaled $30 million. Staff and Catholic chaplains were sent to all Army camps and cantonments.

A total of 260 buildings were erected and 1,134 secretaries (of which 1,075 were overseas), staffed them. In Europe, the headquarters of the Order were established in London and Paris under the motto "Everyone welcome, everything free." This continued until November 1919, at which point the federal government took over. The remaining $19 million were used to establish educational programs for returning servicemen.

According to Supreme Knight Flaherty, the war provided an opportunity to present the Order "in a most favorable light," and to show that Catholics could also be good patriots - avoiding the suspicion that their loyalty lay with the Holy See in Rome.

=== Cristero War ===
Following the Mexican Revolution, the new government started to persecute the Catholic Church. Statutes were inserted into the national Constitution, triggering a 10-year-long struggle with Catholic leaders. During this period, thousands of people died, including several priests who were later canonized. The leaders of the Order began to speak out against the Mexican government. Columbia, the official magazine of the Knights, published articles critical of the regime. After the November 1926 cover showed some knights carrying a banner of liberty and warning of "The Red Peril of Mexico," the Mexican legislature banned both the Order and the magazine.

In 1926, both the Supreme Council and the Massachusetts State Council passed resolutions opposing the Mexican government and in defense of human rights. Ten days later, State Deputy Edmund J. Brandon sent a telegram to President Calvin Coolidge and Secretary of State Frank B. Kellogg opposing the deportation of a Mexican archbishop. That same year, a delegation of Supreme Council officers met with President Coolidge to share with him their concerns about the persecution of Catholics in Mexico. (Note: The delegation included Supreme Knight James A. Flaherty, Deputy Supreme Knight Martin H. Carmody, Supreme Secretary William J. McGinley, Supreme Advocate Luke E. Hart, Supreme Director William C. Prout, and assistant Supreme Secretary John S. Conway.) The delegation did not ask for a military involvement in Mexico, but did express their concerns that the present situation was a result of actions taken by previous American administrations, including the provision of arms to Mexican president Plutarco Elías Calles. As a result, the delegation said, the United States government had a responsibility to aid oppressed Mexicans.

The order subsequently smuggled into Mexico pamphlets in English and Spanish denouncing the anti-clerical Mexican government and its policies, provoking efforts at the border to stop the flow. So much printed material was smuggled into Mexico that the government directed border guards be aware of women bringing Catholic propaganda into the country hidden in their clothes. Twenty-five martyrs from the conflict would eventually be canonized, including six knights. Supreme Treasurer Daniel J. Callahan persuaded Senator William E. Borah to launch an investigation in 1935 into Mexican human rights violations. Pope Pius XI in his encyclical Iniquis afflictisque praised the efforts of the Knights in their resistance. The Knights opposed the Good Neighbor Policy of President Franklin Roosevelt due to the continued suppression of the Catholic Church in Mexico.

=== Spanish Civil War ===
During the Spanish Civil War, the Catholic Church in the United States supported General Francisco Franco and the other rebels. The Knights, and other Catholic groups, took the same stance. When a group of American intellectuals formed the Board of Guardians for Basque Refugee Children and proposed shipping children from Spain to the United States, the Knights with others opposed the plan. They appealed to President Franklin D. Roosevelt to keep the children with their families in France, though they were ready to assist those coming to the United States.

The Knights supported the embargo on all arms into Spain, and appealed to Will H. Hays, chairman of the Motion Picture Producers and Distributors of America, to ban or label as propaganda (pro-Marxist and anti-Catholic) loyalist films.

=== World War II ===
Shortly after entering the Second World War, the Order established a War Activities Committee to keep track of all activities undertaken during the war. They also, in January 1943, established a Peace Program Committee to develop a "program for shaping and educating public opinion to the end that Catholic principles and Catholic philosophy will be properly represented at the peace table at the conclusion of the present war." The committee conferred with scholars, theologians, philosophers, and sociologists and proposed a program adopted at the 1943 Supreme Convention.

=== Middle East ===
During the Syrian and Iraqi Civil Wars, the Knights lobbied Congress to provide humanitarian relief to persecuted Christians and victims of genocide under the Islamic State of Iraq and the Levant, and to declare the atrocities a genocide.

Testimony provided by Supreme Knight Anderson before Congress in 2016 formed the "blueprint" for the Iraq and Syria Genocide Relief and Accountability Act of 2018.

Between 2014 and 2017, the Knights' Refugee Relief Fund gave over $20 million for humanitarian relief work in the area. That includes $2 million to rebuild the primarily Christian town of Karamles in Iraq. Such efforts of the Knights have been recognized by church and civil leaders.

=== Exhibits and media ===
Shortly after the 2003 invasion of Iraq, the Knights' museum showcased Vatican artifacts highlighting the efforts of Pope John Paul II for world peace. The Order also produced the 2018 film, John Paul II in Ireland: A Plea for Peace.

== Social justice issues ==
=== Trade unionism ===
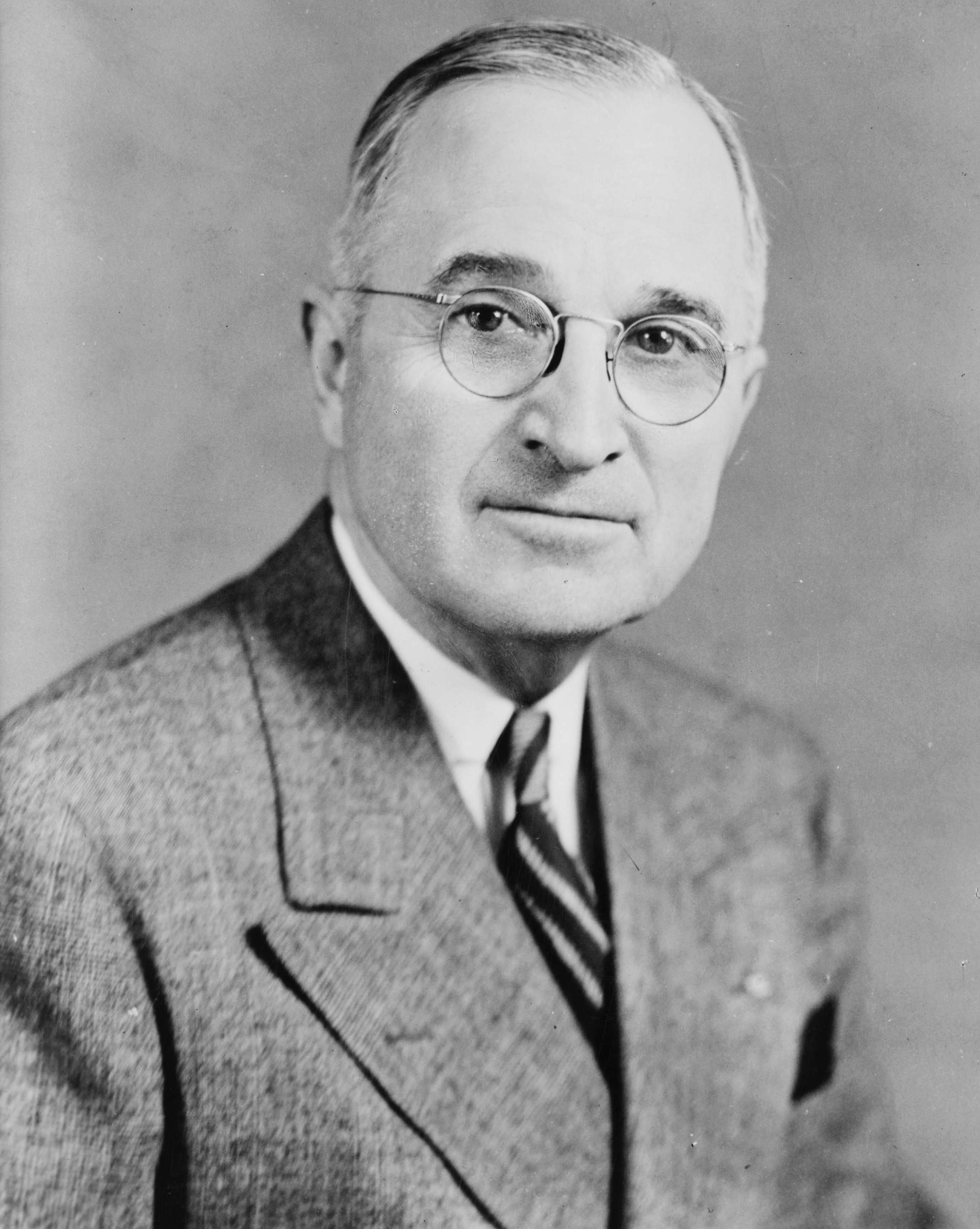
US President Harry S. Truman supported the Crusade for the Preservation and Promotion of American Ideals

In 1914, the order paid the salaries of David Goldstein, who was born Jewish but converted to Catholicism after reading the pro-labor papal encyclical Rerum novarum, and Peter W. Collins, the general secretary of the Brotherhood of Electrical Workers, to lecture around North America. The pair traveled more than 27,000 miles. Local councils were instructed to open up the lectures to the public free of charge. More than 2,000,000 people attended the lectures, and more than 800,000 questions were answered.

In 1946, in his first address to the Supreme Convention as Supreme Knight, Swift proposed a new program eventually called The Knights of Columbus Crusade for the Preservation and Promotion of American Ideals. It was similar to the 1943 Peace Program, except it highlighted Catholic philosophy and Catholic social teaching regarding the working man. This was one part of a larger Catholic anti-communist effort.

The crusade listed the workingman's rights as including the right "to a job, to a family living wage, to collective bargaining and to strike, to Joint-Management, enroute to Joint Ownership of Industry." Until joint ownership happened, workers were also entitled to all forms of social security, including unemployment, disability, and old-age insurance, according to the crusade. The crusade's plan also listed 10 "Abuses of Unrestrained Capitalism."

The crusade officially launched in December 1946 and was endorsed by Harry Truman. By August 1948, over 1,300 local councils had established discussion groups based on the topics. As part of the crusade, several hundred radio stations played segments produced by the order on the alleged evils of communism and the harshness of life in Russia. It also took out advertisements in newspapers and distributed copies of Fulton Sheen's Communism and the Conscience of the West.

=== Social justice ===
In the early 1920s, Supreme Knight James Flaherty gave speeches in which he "lashed out at the social irresponsibility of the moneyed classes." During the Great Depression, when Herbert Hoover established a Commission on Employment, Supreme Knight Martin Carmody wrote to him pledging the services of the Knights. Carmody had already encouraged the 2,600 councils to have "strong and active employment committees." By the end of July 1931, a total of 43,128 unemployed people had been placed into jobs, in addition to those placements made by local councils who were working under the auspices of other organizations. In October of that year, Hoover appointed Carmody to the President's Organization for Unemployment Relief.

The order launched a Crusade for Social Justice in 1938 as an outgrowth of their anti-communist efforts. It was declared that "the public must be aroused to realize that only by the application of Christian principles, in private and public affairs, will there be eliminated, so far as humanly possible, the distress and suffering upon which these forces thrive." Among the social justice issues the Supreme Council recommended local councils take on were a living wage, credit unions, and the cooperative and social responsibilities of employers, bankers, and property owners. The Supreme Council also supplied local councils with a great deal of material to encourage members to study the social encyclicals.

In 1965, the order co-sponsored a conference on human rights with the Archdiocese of Hartford at Yale University. In collaboration with the John LaFarge Institute, the Knights worked on programs to promote social justice and ecumenical outreach in the 1960s. Through the collaboration, they held high level conferences and then passed the findings down to local council to hold their own study groups. At the end of the decade, in 1969, the Knights donated $75,000 to the US Conference of Catholic Bishops' Task Force on Urban Problems. The task force was founded to provide a Catholic response to issues of racism and poverty in America's large cities.

=== Anti-communism ===
In the early 1950s, the Supreme Convention adopted several anti-communist resolutions. However, Columbia magazine also published thinly veiled critiques of McCarthyism and the techniques of Senator Joseph McCarthy. The Order also ran a publicicity campaign and organized a speakers bureau to oppose communism.

== Support of immigrants and refugees ==
=== Early efforts ===
From the founding of the order to roughly the time of the First World War, "the Order's goals were most visibly expressed in its assertion of the social legitimacy and patriotic loyalty of Catholic immigrants." This opposition to immigration restrictionists would continue through the middle of the 20th century

In the years prior to World War I, Canadian Knights established an immigrant aid bureau. After the war, and with the Catholic Women's League, they promoted a "Canadianization of the Newcomer" program. The Knights have also promoted the idea that being a good Catholic can be reconciled with being a good Canadian, and have helped Catholic immigrants assimilate into wider society.

In 1921, Edward F. McSweeney, a former Assistant Commissioner of Immigration at Ellis Island and pro-immigrant activist and author, set up the Knights of Columbus Historical Commission to more clearly present the role of Catholic immigrants in particular in the founding and history of the United States. The Commission published the works of intellectuals including George Schuster, Samuel Flagg Bemis, Allan Nevins, and W. E. B. Du Bois.

The Knights called the tendency to set up a caste system based on when your ancestors arrived in the country "a travesty of democracy." James Malone, then-Kansas State Deputy, argued that those who claimed that immigrants and Catholics were inferior to native-born Americans and protestants were "bigots."

At the request of the Jewish War Veterans of the United States of America, Supreme Knight Martin Carmody wrote to Franklin D. Roosevelt in 1938 to support Jewish refugees seeking refuge in Palestine.

=== 21st century ===
On 9 April 2006 the board of directors commented on the "U.S. immigration policy [which] has become an intensely debated and divisive issue on both sides of the border between the U.S. and Mexico." They called

upon the President and the U.S. Congress to agree upon immigration legislation that not only gains control over the process of immigration, but also rejects any effort to criminalize those who provide humanitarian assistance to illegal immigrants, and provides these immigrants an avenue by which they can emerge from the shadows of society and seek legal residency and citizenship in the U.S.

During the 2008 International Eucharistic Congress, a donation was made by the Order in Canada to Marc Ouellet's foundation to support long-term programs to aid immigrants and refugees.

At the Supreme Convention in 2011, Los Angeles Archbishop José Gómez criticized the United States' immigration policy as not being "worthy of our national character," and told the delegates to approach the immigration issue as Catholics, not through political affiliation. "Our perspective on this issue will change if you begin to see these 'illegals' for who they really are—mothers and fathers, sons and daughters—not much different from yourselves," Gomez said.

In 2013, at the 131st Supreme Convention, Archbishop Gustavo Garcia-Siller of San Antonio, Texas, the site of the convention, quoted Anderson in saying that the city was special because the city's history of "evangelization, immigration, and the quest for freedom." He called on the Knights to bring the light of the Gospel to the "desolate places" such as immigrant detention centers.

Also at the 2013 convention, Supreme Chaplain William Lori said that the Knights' mission in regards to immigration is "definitely growing." He cited their involvement in Ecclesia en America, a summit held in the Vatican in 2012, as a way they protect, love and help immigrants. The Knights see the issue, according to Lori, as "a partnership of the North and South Church." He said the order was working to enact "immigration laws that are truly just, and truly merciful."

In 2016, the Knights provided funding to the dioceses of Ciudad Juárez and El Paso to facilitate Pope Francis' visit to the US-Mexican border which highlighted the plight of migrants from majority-Catholic Mexico, and the need therefore to work for "just immigration laws."

At the 2017 convention, Cardinal Daniel DiNardo of Galveston-Houston, president of the U.S. bishops’ conference, said that Christ teaches that "there is no more boundary when it comes to 'who are you neighbor to?'" DiNardo added that the Knights live this teaching by helping anyone in need, including immigrants, refugees, and Christians displaced from their homes.

At the 136th Supreme Convention in 2018, the Order adopted a resolution criticizing the Trump administration family separation policy. The Supreme Council called on the administration to "equitably balance the legitimate rights of persons to emigrate in order to seek better lives for themselves and their children, with the duty of governments to control migration into their countries so that immigration policy serves the common good."

The Order has also supported the creation of by the Melkite Greek Catholic Church of an Arab Christian Council within Canada as adding "new meaning to the international fraternal organization’s outreach and support of immigrant communities." The council is largely made up of first-generation Canadians from Palestine, Syria, Jordan, Lebanon, Egypt, and Iraq.

== Protection of civil rights ==
Up until the First World War, the Order were active to reassure that Catholic immigrants to the US could nevertheless be loyal to their new home, and would opposed restrictions to immigration throughout the middle of the 20th century

During the nadir of American race relations in the 1920s, the state councils initiated letter-writing campaigns and established lobbyists in state capitals and in Washington, D.C., to protect the civil rights of all Catholics within the United States.

=== Religious and racial discrimination ===
From 1914 until the United States' entrance into the First World War, the Order sponsored the Knights of Columbus Commission on Religious Prejudice. A similar organization, the Knights of Columbus Historical Commission, was created in 1921 to counter racial discrimination and nativism. The Commission published one pamphlet a month for two years to explain historical events that had not, in the view of the Commission, been treated fairly. The "Knights of Columbus Racial Contributions Series" of books included three titles: The Gift of Black Folk, by W. E. B. Du Bois, The Jews in the Making of America by George Cohen, and The Germans in the Making of America by Frederick Schrader.

During the First World War, the order established a series of "huts" to offer rest and recreational facilities for Allied servicemen under the banner of "Everyone Welcome, Everything Free." Civil rights activist and author Emmett Jay Scott praised the Order, saying that "to its credit," and "unlike the other social welfare organizations operating in the war, it never drew the color line. ... The Negro soldier needs no other countersign than his khaki uniform to gain for him every advantage offered by the Knights service."

In the 1950s, though the Order officially did not discriminate on race, most knights and most councils were white. Given the history of slavery and early development in the U.S., most African-Americans were Protestant, but Church officials and organizations encouraged integration and criticized the segregationist practices within the Order. As membership questions were handled at the local level, black candidates were routinely denied membership in the Order. At the 1964 Supreme Convention, membership rules were overhauled after the blackballing of a black applicant led to national news coverage the previous year. Six council officers resigned in protest, and rules were changed to require a third of members to vote to deny membership, instead of just five or more.

That convention was scheduled to be held at the Roosevelt Hotel in New Orleans. A few days before the Convention, new Supreme Knight John W. McDevitt learned the hotel admitted only white guests. After he threatened to move the Convention to another venue, the hotel changed its policy.

The Order participated in the Civil Rights Movement. In the spring of 1963, Hart attended a conference at the White House led by Knight and President John F. Kennedy to discuss civil rights. That same year, the Order organized and funded a large number of African Americans who traveled to Washington DC for the March on Washington. Because they were unable to find hotels or other housing accommodations in the city, they stayed in the gymnasium at The Catholic University of America.

In 2017, at a time of rising racial tensions in the United States, Anderson, Rev. Eugene Rivers, and others began calling on Americans to adopt Martin Luther King's principles of non-violence. Anderson and Rivers co-authored a piece in Time, and the Knights and Rivers' Seymour Institute for Black Church and Policy Studies sent out letters to religious leaders around the country promoting non-violence. The pair also asked them "to help lead our country away from the precipice of violence and toward a future of honest and open civil discourse and respect for the dignity of each person." The two also spoke at a Knights-sponsored gathering of Christian leaders at the Martin Luther King Jr. Memorial on the need for racial harmony. That same year, the Knights began funding the United States Conference of Catholic Bishops' Ad Hoc Committee Against Racism, and continued to do so during its second three year term. (Note: The other funders were the Black and Indian Missions Office and the Catholic Campaign for Human Development.)

=== Pierce v. Society of Sisters ===
The ACLU joined with the Knights to oppose the Oregon Compulsory Education Act

After the First World War, many American organizations (including, influentially, the Ku Klux Klan) expressed fears of immigrants and their differences from mainstream America; they wanted public schools to teach children their specific way of being American. Numerous states drafted laws designed to use schools to promote a selected American culture, and in 1922, the voters of Oregon passed the Oregon Compulsory Education Act. The law was primarily aimed at eliminating parochial schools, including Catholic schools. It was promoted by groups such as the Knights of Pythias, the Federation of Patriotic Societies, the Oregon Good Government League, the Orange Order, and the Ku Klux Klan.

The Oregon Compulsory Education Act required almost all children in Oregon between eight and sixteen years of age to attend public school by 1926. Roger Nash Baldwin, an associate director of the American Civil Liberties Union and a personal friend of then–Supreme Advocate and future Supreme Knight Luke E. Hart, offered to join forces with the order to challenge the law. The Knights of Columbus pledged an immediate $10,000 to fight the law and any additional funds necessary to defeat it.

The case became known as Pierce v. Society of Sisters, a seminal United States Supreme Court decision that significantly expanded coverage of the Due Process Clause in the Fourteenth Amendment. In a unanimous decision, the court held that the act was unconstitutional and that parents, not the state, had the authority to educate children as they thought best. It upheld the right of parents to send their children to religious schools.

== Social issues ==
=== Marriage and family life ===
The Knights of Columbus "promotes the dignity and the irreplaceable value of the family founded on the Church's understanding of marriage as the faithful, exclusive, and lifelong union of one man and one woman joined in an intimate partnership of life and love." Since 2005, the Knights have given at least $14 million to legally retain this definition in the United States. In 2008, they were the largest single donor in support of California's Proposition 8.

In 2012, the Knights and its local councils contributed $1 million to support similar ballot campaigns to effectively block same-sex marriage in Maine, Maryland, Minnesota, and Washington. In Massachusetts, it led the drive to collect the 170,000 petition signatures to amend the Massachusetts Constitution to include this definition. Likewise in Canada, in 2005, it attempted to stop the Canadian parliament from legalizing same-sex marriage with the Civil Marriage Act, the Order funded a campaign that included 800,000 postcards encouraging members of parliament to reject the measure.

The Order also supports the church's teaching on divorce, and the Supreme Council gave their "strong support" to a 1976 address by Bishop Daniel A. Cronin in which he denounced the "increasing practice" of divorce. The Order has a number of initiatives to support and strengthen families as part of their Building the Domestic Church program. The promotion of fatherhood and marital harmony dates back to the founding era of the Order.

=== Culture of Life ===
The Order has been active in promoting a culture of life and opposing any government action or legislation that promotes the destruction of human life at any stage, including abortion and euthanasia. (Note: "More than a rhetorical flourish," the phrase "culture of life" refers the belief that human life at all stages from conception through natural death is sacred, and in practice has emphasized birth and death issues. It encompasses opposition to a number of bio-ethical practices that are destructive of human life, including physician assisted suicide, embryonic stem cell research, and abortion, and the promotion of policies that "lift up the human spirit with compassion and love." The term was made popular by Pope John Paul II.) Those "who do not support the legal protection of unborn children" cannot be invited to events, or have honors bestowed upon them.

Additionally the Order has donated significant funds to help women in crisis pregnancies either keep their children or put them up for adoption. For example, as part of their Ultrasound Initiative in the US and Canada, 1,000 ultrasound machines were donated to pregnancy centers between 2009 and 2018. This was done on the basis of research that suggested women would subsequently be less willing to go through with an abortion if they had seen ultrasound images, particularly as part of fetal development.

In the wake of killings of two men, Alton Sterling and Philando Castile, by police officers in Louisiana and Minnesota, and the subsequent shooting of Dallas police officers, the Order has campaigned for peace. After multiple mass shootings in 2019, the Knights were among a group of Catholic leaders who decried the shootings and urged policy changes.

The Order also upholds Catholic teaching on the death penalty, where it is allowed only when society has no other way to protect itself. "Such cases," the Knights quote Evangelium Vitae, "are very rare if not practically nonexistent." In a modern society, with jails that can separate those who pose a threat from the public, imposing the death penalty "when it is not necessary would transgress Catholic teaching."

== United States domestic policy ==
During the early part of the 20th century, both the Supreme and local councils found themselves in agreement with the principles of the Progressive movement. Senator Albert J. Beveridge, an intellectual leader of the Progressive movement, was the featured speaker at "a grand patriotic demonstration" at Carnegie Hall in 1906, and James C. Monaghan, the Supreme Lecturer, frequently spoke out in favor of progressive causes in Columbiad and elsewhere. The Massachusetts State Council was supportive of New Deal policies in 1933.

In the 1980s, the Knights supported an amendment to the United States Constitution permitting prayer in public school. When president Ronald Reagan attempted to tax fraternal insurance companies such as the Knights of Columbus, then–Supreme Knight Virgil Dechant used White House connections to scuttle the effort. In addition, local councils set up phone banks and letter writing campaigns to oppose the measure, which would have diminished the Knights' ability to make charitable contributions. They also ran anti-pornography campaigns and promoted tax breaks for families that sent their children to private schools.

=== Pledge of Allegiance ===
The Order played a role in the early stages of the movement that eventually led to the decision by the US Congress to add the phrase "under God" to the Pledge of Allegiance in 1954. Louis Albert Bowman, an attorney from Illinois, was actually the first to suggest this addition and it was used in the 1940s at meetings of the Illinois Society of the Sons of the American Revolution However, the Knights also adopted the practice following the Fourth Degree Assemblies in April 1951. Though the words had not yet officially been added nationally, the Order added the phrase to their recitations, the first group to voluntarily do so on a regular basis. Doing so, the Order believed, would acknowledge "the dependence of our Nation and its people upon the Creator of the Universe." The Knights forwarded a resolution advocating for the addition to New York Congressman Edmund Radwan, and Radwan entered it into the Congressional Record on 25 March 1953.

Rep. Charles Oakman (R-Mich.), introduced a bill into Congress adding the words in 1954. After signing the change into law, President Dwight Eisenhower wrote to Supreme Knight Luke E. Hart thanking the Knights for their part. In 2014, when the American Humanist Association sued to reverse the decision, lawyers from the Knights and other organizations successfully supported schools that used the phrase in the pledge.

=== Promotion of Christopher Columbus ===
At the behest of the Knights, the US Congress appropriated $100,000 to construct the Columbus Fountain in front of Union Station in Washington, D.C., in 1912. Similar lobbying convinced many state legislatures to adopt 12 October as Columbus Day, confirmed by President F. D. Roosevelt as a federal holiday in 1937.

=== US Senate confirmations ===
In December 2018, during the confirmation process of nominee Brian C. Buescher to the U.S. District Court, Senator Mazie K. Hirono characterized the position the Knights of Columbus have taken on social issues as "extreme" and asked Buescher, "If confirmed, do you intend to end your membership with this organization to avoid any appearance of bias?" Senator Kamala Harris also asked about opinions held by the organization and asked Buescher if he was aware these views when he joined the Knights of Columbus. Buescher replied that he was eighteen years old when he joined and did not recall if the Knights had at that time taken any position on those issues with which the Senator now disagreed.

Writing in the Los Angeles Times, Rabbi Mitchell Rocklin said that the senators approach amounted to a "religious test" such as is precluded by Article VI of the Constitution. Rabbi Rocklin said: "The line of questioning Buescher faced about his affiliation with the Knights of Columbus sets a troubling precedent of intolerance—one that is unconscionable in principle and terrible in practice for people of all faiths who seek a role in public service. ...For centuries, many Jews have suffered a similar 'dual loyalty' smear: the anti-Semitic lie that, faced with a choice between country and religion, a Jewish public official will put his faith before his country." Micklin noted the anti-Semitism experienced by Justices Louis Brandeis and Benjamin N. Cardozo, and further state, "It is even more absurd for senators to imply that a judge, who cannot propose or enact legislation, would be incapable of setting aside his religious beliefs when interpreting our written laws. ...If sitting lawmakers are allowed to make such assumptions of Catholic nominees, religious minorities could very well be next."

== Foreign policy ==
During the Cold War, the foreign policy of the United States and the Knights' promotion of Catholic Social Teaching frequently intersected. The Knights urged the UN to restrain the Soviet Union during the Hungarian Revolution of 1956.

In the 1950s, the Knights successfully lobbied President Eisenhower to not invite Josip Broz Tito, leader of Yugoslavia, to visit the United States in view of his jailing of Cardinal Aloysius Stepinac.

At the 1953 Supreme Convention, the delegates adopted a resolution calling for a united Ireland. The Supreme Council adopted a resolution in 1969 endorsing the aims and justice of the Vietnam War, but as the war progressed Columbia magazine began to question the effectiveness of the United States' military effort. In Massachusetts, the State Council passed resolutions in the early 1960s calling on the Catholic Church to prevent the spread of communism in Latin America and opposing communist China from joining the United Nations.

== Other countries ==
In Canada, by 1910 the Knights were seen as "those laymen who could successfully defend the Church from external opposition when required and, more importantly, could voice the opinions and teachings of the Church, bringing them to bear of the problems of Canadian society." Toronto Council 1388 established a public affairs committee in 1912 that was mandated to increase the interest of Catholics in public affairs and to promote their participation in political life. In the Philippines, local Knights campaigned against government sponsored birth control and condom advocacy.

== See also ==
- Confirmation hearings of judge Brian C. Buescher

== Bibliography ==
- Alley, Robert S. (1999). The Constitution & Religion: Leading Supreme Court Cases on Church and State. Amherst, New York: Prometheus Books. ISBN 978-1-57392-703-1.
- Bauernschub, John P. (2008). Fifty Years of Columbianism in Maryland. Wildside Press. ISBN 978-1-4344-7427-8.
- Ceplair, Larry (2011). Anti-Communism in Twentieth-Century America: A Critical History. Santa Barbara, California: Praeger. ISBN 978-1-4408-0048-1.
- Crosby, Donald F. (1971). "Boston's Catholics and the Spanish Civil War: 1936-1939". The New England Quarterly. 44 (1): 82–100. doi:10.2307/364944. JSTOR 364944.
- Dumenil, Lynn (Fall 1991). "The tribal Twenties: "Assimilated" Catholics' response to Anti-Catholicism in the 1920s". Journal of American Ethnic History. 11 (1): 21–49. JSTOR 27500903.
- Kauffman, Christopher J. (1982). Faith and Fraternalism: The History of the Knights of Columbus, 1882–1982. Harper and Row. ISBN 978-0-06-014940-6.
- Kazin, Michael (1998). The Populist Persuasion: An American History. Ithaca, New York: Cornell University Press. ISBN 978-0-8014-8558-9.
- Koehlinger, Amy (2004). "'Let Us Live for Those Who Love Us': Faith, Family, and the Contours of Manhood among the Knights of Columbus in Late Nineteenth-Century Connecticut". Journal of Social History. 38 (2): 455–469. doi:10.1353/jsh.2004.0126. ISSN 1527-1897. JSTOR 3790447. S2CID 144647069.
- Lapomarda, Vincent A. (1992). The Knights of Columbus in Massachusetts (second ed.). Norwood, Massachusetts: Knights of Columbus Massachusetts State Council.
- McGowan, Mark G. (1999). Waning of the Green: Catholics, the Irish, and Identity in Toronto, 1887-1922. McGill-Queen's Press - MQUP. ISBN 978-0-7735-1789-9.
- Meyer, Jean (1976). The Cristero Rebellion: The Mexican People between Church and State, 1926–1929. Cambridge, England: Cambridge University Press.
- Robé, Christopher (2010). "The Good Fight: The Spanish Civil War and U.S. Left Film Criticism". Framework: The Journal of Cinema and Media. 51 (1): 79–107. doi:10.1353/frm.0.0057. JSTOR 41552568. S2CID 159438369.
- Sale, Kirkpatrick (1992). The Conquest of Paradise: Christopher Columbus and the Columbian Legacy. Papermac. ISBN 978-0-333-57479-9.
- Scott, Emmett J. (1919). Scott's Official History of the American Negro in the World War. Chicago: Homewood Press.
- Sweany, Mark J. (1923). Educational Work of the Knights of Columbus. Bureau of Education Bulletin. Vol. 22. Washington: Government Printing Office. hdl:2346/60378.
- Young, Julia G. (2015a). Mexican Exodus: Emigrants, Exiles, and Refugees of the Cristero War. New York: Oxford University Press. doi:10.1093/acprof:oso/9780190205003.001.0001. ISBN 978-0-19-020500-3.
- Young, Julia G. (23 July 2015b). "Smuggling for Christ the King". OUPblog. New York: Oxford University Press.
