= Charitable activities of the Knights of Columbus =

Fraternal year	Money donated	Volunteer hours
2026	$200 million	48 million
2024	$190 million	47 million
2023	$185 million	49 million
2022	$154 million	47+ million
2019	$185 million	76 million
2015	$175+ million	73.5+ million
2013	$167.5+ million	70+ million
1982 (Note: The totals for the previous 12 years were $238 million donated and 65 million hours of service.)	$41.7 million	10.4 million

The charitable activities of the Knights of Columbus include the time and money which are donated to charitable causes by the Supreme, state, and local councils of the Order of the Knights of Columbus. Charity is the foremost principle of the Knights of Columbus. At its 2026 convention, the supreme knight reported the Knights had donated over $200 million and 48 million volunteer hours to charitable projects the previous year.

United in Charity, a general, unrestricted endowment fund, was introduced at the 2004 Supreme Council meeting to support and ensure the overall long-term charitable and philanthropic goals of the order. The fund is wholly managed, maintained, and operated by Knights of Columbus Charities, Inc., a 501(c)(8) charitable organization. Before United in Charity was formed, all requests for funds were met with the general funds of the order or in combination with specific appeals.

The reach and ability to give large sums of money has caused some to worry that it can influence the ecclesiology and governance of the church itself.

== Employment ==
At its 1897 convention, Supreme Knight John J. Phelan spoke of the need to assist fellow knights who were in distress as a result of the economic depression in the United States. This led to the establishment of charitable funds within local councils. During the early 20th century, local councils often functioned as agencies for social welfare to support Catholics. Councils occasionally established unemployment bureaus to find jobs for Catholics (including non-members).

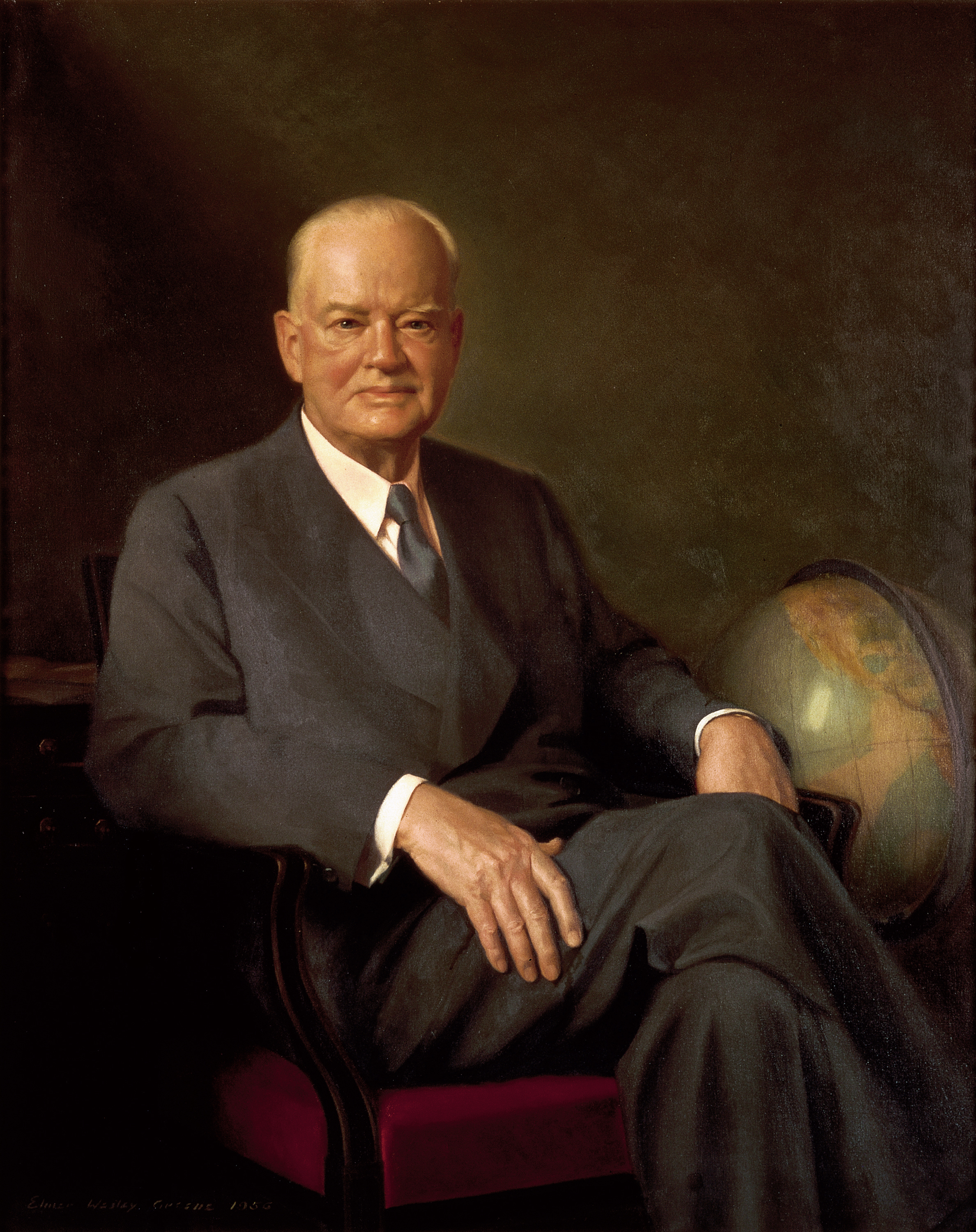
Herbert Hoover appointed Supreme Knight Martin Carmody to the President's Organization for Unemployment Relief.

When Supreme Knight Martin Carmody assumed office in 1927, on the eve of the Great Depression in the United States, he urged knights to cherish the virtue of charity. When President Herbert Hoover established the President's Organization for Unemployment Relief in 1931, Carmody wrote to him pledging the services of the Order. Carmody had already encouraged the 2,600 councils to have "strong and active employment committees." Some, such as the 20 councils in Saint Louis, joined together to establish full-time employment agencies throughout the 1920s.

The Order also established a Bureau of Employment at their headquarters in New Haven to coordinate efforts among councils. Peter Collins, who ran the effort for returning servicemen after World War I, ran the new Bureau. By the end of July 1931, a total a 43,128 unemployed people had been placed into jobs. In less than two years, the Order would provide more than 100,000 jobs. In October of that year, Hoover appointed Carmody to the Organization.

== People with disabilities ==
The Knights have a tradition of supporting those with physical and developmental disabilities. Charles P. Greco was largely responsible for engagement of the Order in this area. One of the largest recipients has been the Special Olympics. The Order's support goes back to the first games in 1968.

== Disaster relief ==
Giving to those in need of natural disasters dates back to the earliest days of the Order. After a flood in Kansas in 1903, the Order raised US$5,000 to be distributed to parishes and local councils, and it collected over US$100,000 after the 1906 San Francisco earthquake. In 1927, the order gave US$50,000 for flood relief.

The Knights of Columbus also gave significant charitable contributions to the people of Haiti in the aftermath of the earthquake in 2010. The order also donated 1,000 wheelchairs to the people of Haiti in partnership with the Global Wheelchair Mission. The Knights also partnered with Project Medishare for an initiative entitled, "Healing Haiti's Children." The initiative, backed by a more than US$2.5 million commitment from the Knights of Columbus provided free prosthetic limbs and a minimum of two years of rehab to every child.

In 2015, the order donated hundreds of thousands of dollars to victims of typhoons and other natural disasters.

== Housing ==
In 1967, the Massachusetts State Council voted to establish a non-profit corporation to construct affordable housing. The Boston Redevelopment Authority selected the Knights to develop a parcel, but the Supreme Council did not like the idea. The Massachusetts State Council constructed Christopher Columbus Waterfront Park in Boston's North End instead.

The Order donates money and volunteer hours to Habitat for Humanity.

== Coats for Kids ==
In 2009, the Order began giving winter jackets to needy children through its Coats for Kids program. As of 2023, they had donated more than 1 million coats. Baseball pitcher Ty Blach supports the program and participated along with Patrick Kelly at a ceremony in Denver, Colorado to mark the 1 millionth donation; in this ceremony, they also made $10,000 donations to five local Catholic schools.

== Health initiatives ==
The Order set up its first national blood drive in 1938.

The Knights believe that showing pregnant women ultrasound images of their fetuses will make them less likely to go through with an abortion; by 2019, they had donated over 1,000 machines to centers throughout the United States and Canada.

Following the United States Supreme Court decision in Dobbs v. Jackson Women's Health Organization, Supreme Knight Patrick Kelly called on the order to increase their support for women facing unplanned and crisis pregnancies with the Aid and Support After Pregnancy (ASAP) initiative. Whenever a local council donates to a pregnancy center or maternity home, the Supreme Council will make a matching donation of 20%. They set an initial goal of $5 million for the first year of the program.

== Refugees ==
=== Middle East ===
Between 2014 and 2018, the Knights gave more than $20 million to provide food, shelter, clothing, and medical care to persecuted Christians and other religious minorities in the Middle East.

At a Solidarity Dinner for the Washington-based group In Defense of Christians, Vice President Mike Pence singled out the order for their "extraordinary work caring for the persecuted around the world." Between 2014 and 2017, the Knights of Columbus Christian Refugee Relief Fund gave over $17 million for humanitarian relief work in the area. That includes $2 million to rebuild the primarily Christian town of Karamles in Iraq.

At the end of 2017, the Knights and the United States Conference of Catholic Bishops recognized a "Week of Awareness" for persecuted Christians. In 2018, a national awareness campaign was launched by the Knights to bring greater public awareness to the plight of Christians in the Middle East. In 2017, the Knights praised the decision of the US government to provide direct US aid to persecuted Christians in the Middle East who were suffering at the hands of the Islamic State. They also led the effort to get the United States Department of State to declare the atrocities a genocide.

=== Latin Americans ===
The Knights donated $250,000 in 2018 to help refugees crossing over the Mexico–United States border who were seeking asylum in the United States. At the Supreme Convention, Anderson announced that they were prepared to expand the program to aid those in refugee camps in every state along the border.

=== Ukraine ===
In the aftermath of the 2022 Russian invasion of Ukraine, the 2,000 Knights of Columbus in the country worked to help those impacted. Within days of the invasion, leaders of the Knights met with Mieczysław Mokrzycki, the Latin-rite archbishop of Lviv, and Sviatoslav Shevchuk, the Major Archbishop of the Ukrainian Greek Catholic Church, and created the Anti-Crisis Committee to better coordinate relief efforts. They began by providing food and clothing to those at train and bus stations in Lviv who were fleeing into Poland. They then began organizing busses to take people the Polish border.

Once in Poland, knights in that country established a Mercy Center to welcome refugees and provide additional aid. In the first three months of the war, the Knights in Poland helped more than 300,000 people, or 10% of those who fled to that country. Polish knights also organized relief boxes of supplies, donated by knights from around the world, to ship back into Ukraine to help those who remained. Convoys of supplies cross the border into war zones once or twice a week.

Aid is provided according to need and without regard to the religion of the recipients. The name of the Knights work in Ukraine is the Ukraine Solidarity Fund, which had raised $20 million as of early 2023. By the end of 2023, the Order had served over 1.4 million Ukrainians. More than 7.3 million pounds of humanitarian supplies had been donated, along with 250,000 care packages and 400 wheelchairs.

State Deputy Youriy Maletskiy was awarded the St. Michael Award at the 2022 Supreme Convention for the work he had done and was doing to help civilian refugees and others in the country. The award is given to those who provide exemplary service to the Order and the Church. The Knights released a film, "In Solidarity with Ukraine", in February 2023. The 60-minute documentary details the humanitarian crisis in Ukraine primarily through interviews with many Ukrainians.

In December 2023, Russia banned the Knights of Columbus, along with the Ukrainian Greek Catholic Church and other Catholic organizations in occupied areas of Ukraine's Zaporizhzhia region. Russia claimed the Knights were "associated with the intelligence services of the United States and the Vatican."

== Vatican initiatives ==
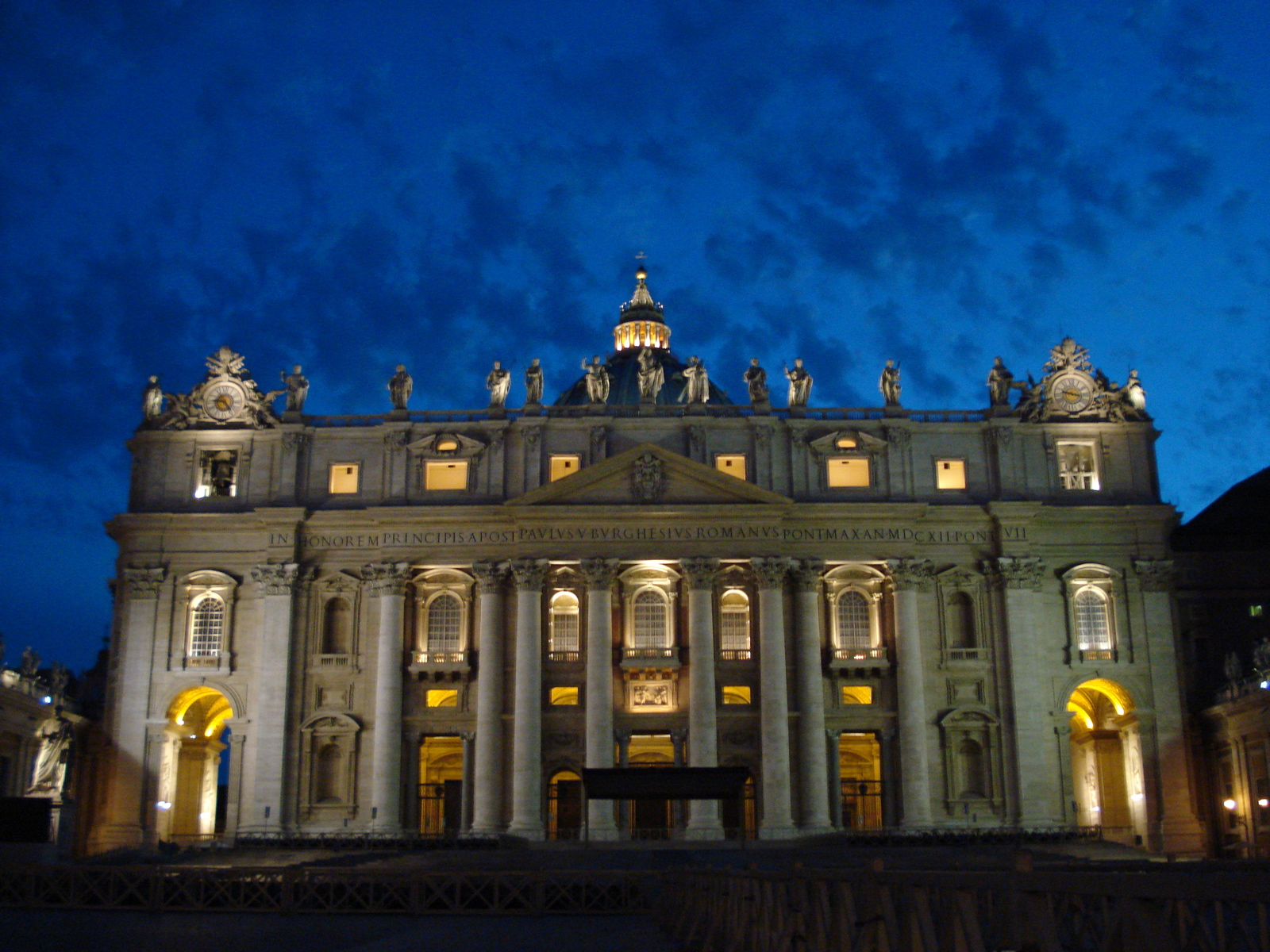
The order contributed towards the renovation of the façade of St. Peter's Basilica.

In 1965, the Knights donated the land in Rome for the building of the Paul VI Audience Hall. The Vicarius Christi Fund has an endowment of US$20 million. Since its establishment in 1981, the fund has generated over $57 million for the Pope's personal charities. The funds are invested in loans to churches.

The Vox Clara Committee received $100,000 in support of its efforts to translate liturgical texts.

== Bishops' conferences and church facilities ==
The Knights give to individual churches and diocese, but is also a major donor to the United States Conference of Catholic Bishops. They have spent more than $1.4 million between 2010 and 2014 to provide workshops for the bishops coordinated by the National Catholic Bioethics Center. Since 1977, the order has provided funding to the Canadian Conference of Catholic Bishops.

In 1979, a US$500,000 memorial fund was set up to support the Basilica of the National Shrine of the Immaculate Conception in Washington. The Order also operates the Saint John Paul II National Shrine. A further $20 million went to church facilities and $7.4 million to Catholic schools from state and local councils.

== Education initiatives ==
=== Catholic University of America ===
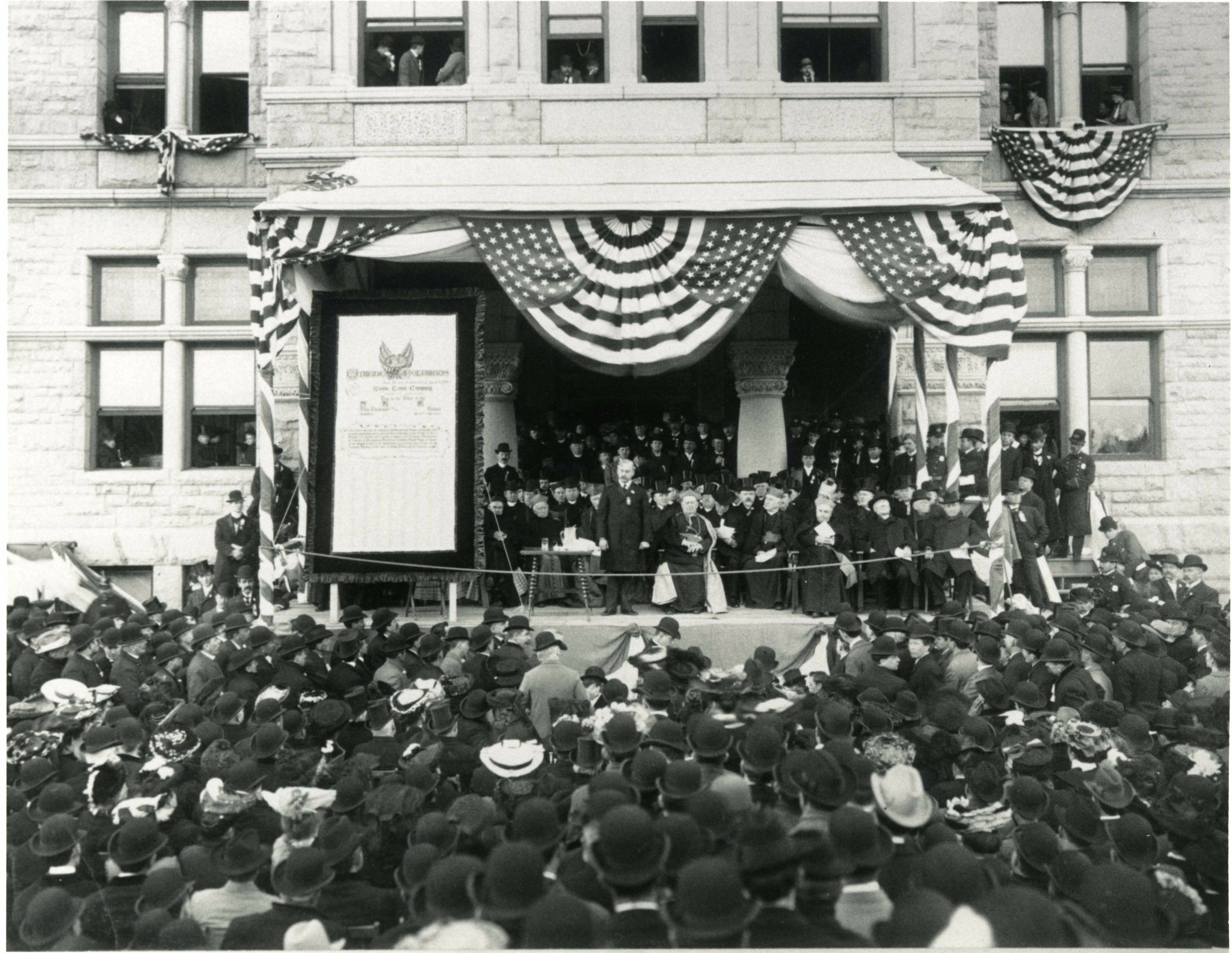
The Knights of Columbus presented a check to Catholic University of America on the steps of the university's McMahon Hall in 1904 to establish a Chair of American History

In the early years of the Order, educational activities were limited to things like establishing scholarships to local institutions, placing books in libraries, holding public lectures, and similar activities. In 1904, in the first national response to a call from the American Church, the Order presented a check for over $50,000 to The Catholic University of America to establish a chair of American history. In the years following this initial gift, an additional $500,000 was raised to establish 50 scholarships at the university. Originally there was to be one fellowship for every $10,000, with preference going to Knights or their families.By 1922, 146 K. of C. Fellowships had been awarded.

=== Post–World War I efforts ===
Following efforts to support servicemen during World War I, the order established an educational system for returning veterans. It included evening schools, scholarships, and a correspondence school, all of which were free for men who fought in the war. The system was run by Mark J. Sweany. Within four years, over 200,000 men would take courses in one of the order's schools, 400 would receive college scholarships, and over 10,000 would take correspondence courses.

Year	Schools	Students
1919–20	45	31,163
1920-21	87	79,843
1921-22	75	67,196
1922-23		

In June 1919, the Knights established a school a school for servicemen at Camp Devens in Massachusetts. By November, when the government took over and the Knights left military facilities, classes were being taught on 25 army camps and naval bases with 5,884 students.

The brief experience showed both the need and the desire of servicemen to continue their education, however, and so the Knights became the first organization to establish free evening schools for able-bodied veterans. Courses were taught in academic, commercial, trade, and technical topics to prepare the ex-servicemen for post-war employment. The first such school opened in Boston, Massachusetts, on July 7, 1919. By the end of the year, 31,163 students were taking courses in 45 schools around the country. An insubstantial number of those students were not veterans, but instead paid tuition to attend.

=== Council schools ===
Year	Schools	Students
1919–1920	21	>7,000
1920–1921	38	19,467
1921–1922	31	22,735
1922–1923		

The Supreme Council established a committee of education on August 7, 1919, to administer a series of night schools run by councils, and appropriated $50,000 for administrative costs. Occupational courses were offered to members and the general public for a fee. Courses were taught not only to improve the students' career prospects, but also to promote patriotism in the hopes that the greater good of the community would also benefit from the knowledge being imparted. Veterans were allowed to attend these schools at no cost.

=== Scholarships ===
The Knights of Columbus was the first organization to provide college scholarships to veterans returning home from World War I. The War Activities Committee first announced in August 1919 that 50 scholarships would be awarded, including tuition, fees, books, equipment, and room and board. Originally intending to limit the number of scholarships to 100, the Committee instead decided to award a scholarship to every man who was accepted to one of several designated schools by September 30, 1919. There were 2,291 applicants, and 1,002 were deemed eligible. Of those, 440 were deemed eligible for entrance by the colleges and universities, and 403 scholarships were awarded.

=== Correspondence courses ===
A correspondence school was established by the Knights in February 1922 to serve veterans in areas outside of cities. By the end of that year, more than 10,000 students had enrolled from every state in the union. The goal was to extend to veterans "in the smaller communities and in the rural districts of the advantages of free educational opportunities through correspondence courses." Students were permitted to take one course at a time.

The courses were established for the benefit of those men and women who had served in the militaries of the United States or her allies during World War I, but not civilians. The order partnered with several universities to prepare the courses, and several provided materials at low or no cost.

Students paid their own postage, and put down refundable deposits on some books, but there were no other costs for most courses. When equipment was needed, students could either furnish their own or purchase it at "the lowest possible price" from the Knights' Educational Bureau. Students could take up to one year to complete the courses.

=== Seminarians ===
In 2012, $1.8 million was given by state and local councils to seminaries, with an additional $5.9 million in direct assistance to seminarians. In 2017, more than $3.8 million was given to 6,348 seminarians and postulants. The order also has eleven separate funds totaling $18 million to assist men and women who are discerning religious vocations pay tuition and other expenses.

=== Other efforts ===
After World War II, the order established scholarships for children on Knights who were killed or wounded in war. In 1970 this scholarship was extended to the children of police officers.

The order funded a message from the Pope to the delegates of the 1979 National Catholic Education Association convention in which the pontiff stressed the importance of Catholic education. The same year, the Supreme Board voted to fund the Conference's Advisory Committee on Public Policy and Catholic Schools.

In 1979, the Supreme Board voted to fund the Conference's Advisory Committee on Public Policy and Catholic Schools. In 1980, each member in the United States and Canada was assessed $1.00 to raise $1 million for the newly established Father Michael J. McGivney Memorial Fund for New Initiatives in Catholic Education. The fund was designed to support the National Catholic Education Association's research efforts. The association expressed their appreciation for this and other efforts to promote Catholic education by awarding the order the C. ALbert Koob Merit Award in 1981.

== Catholic media ==
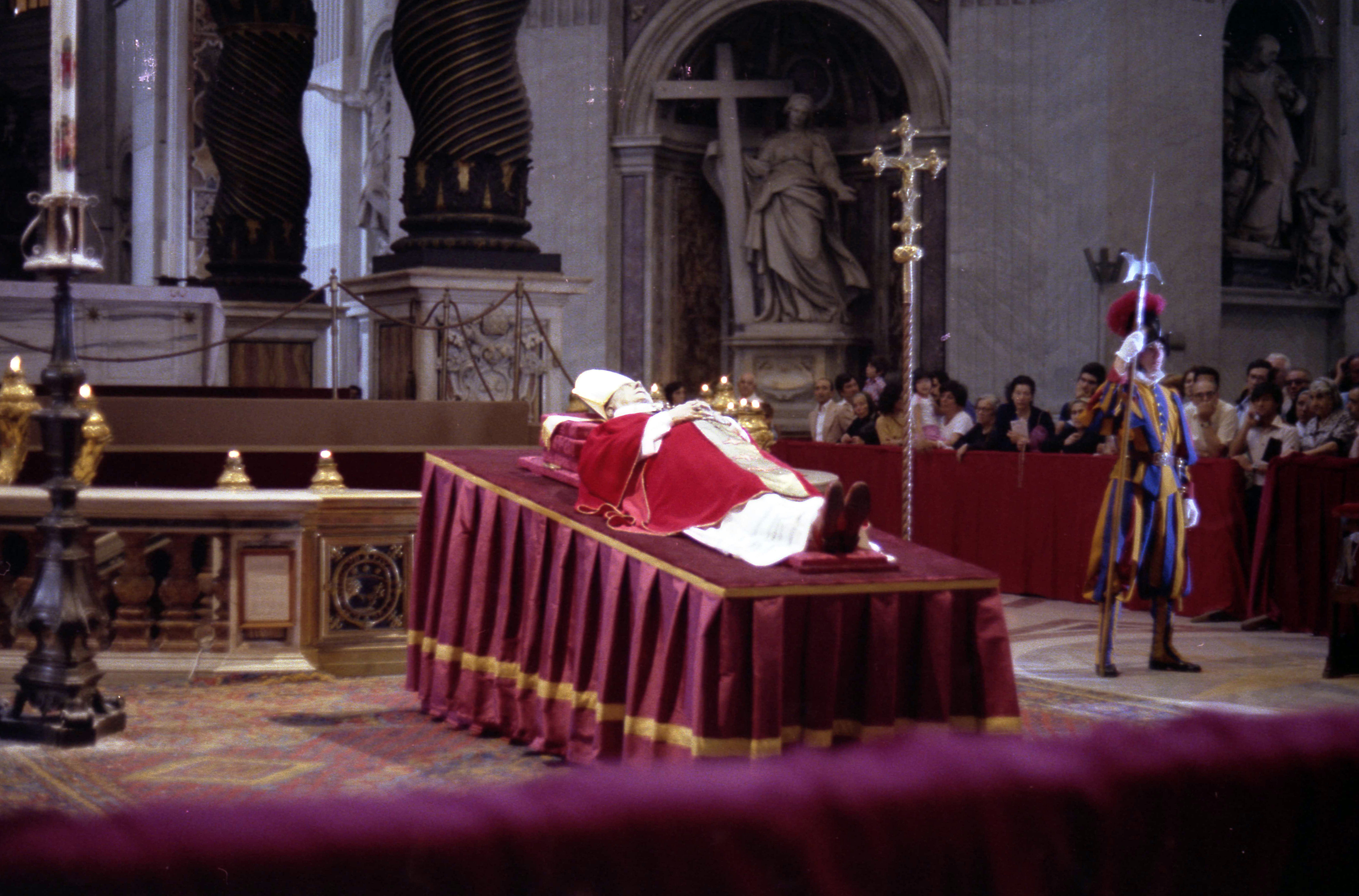
The Knights paid for the funeral of Pope Paul VI to be televised around the world.

Since the 1960s, the Knights' Satellite Uplink Program has provided funding to broadcast a number of papal events, including the annual Easter and Christmas Masses, as well as the World Day of Peace in Assisi, World Youth Days, the opening of the Holy Door at St. Peter's Basilica for the Millennial Jubilee, Pope John Paul II's visit to Nazareth, and several other events. In missionary territories the order also pays for the satellite downlink.

The Satellite Uplink project was originally planned to telecast three papal events each year. However, the program expanded when, upon the death of Pope Paul VI, Bishop Andrew-Maria Deskur, president of the Pontifical Commission for Social Communications, telegrammed Supreme Knight Dechant asking if the order would pay to broadcast the funeral and following conclave and investiture of the next pope. The same request was made shortly thereafter following the death of Pope John Paul I. It is estimated that each telecast was seen by more than 800 million people.

In recent years a contribution of $100,000 was made to support the Holy See's strategic communications office. It also purchased "a mobile unit with recording and transmitting equipment to enable Vatican television to broadcast in high definition."

In 1977, Deskur asked the order for funding for two additional projects, the Vatican Film Library and Radio Veritas, both of which were approved. The film library was designed to collect all the known video footage of popes for use by journalists, scholars, and others. This resulted in the creation of the Knights of Columbus Vatican Film Library at Saint Louis University.

Following Pope John Paul II's trip to Mexico in 1978, the Knights produced an English-language video documenting the visit. The following year the pontiff returned to Poland. Bishop Paul Marcinkus, President of the Institute for the Works of Religion, later told the order that raw footage of the trip existed, but there were no funds available to edit it into a usable format. The Knights provided the money, and the videos were shown on Polish television and in movie theaters. During his visit to the United States in October of the same year, the order once again provided funding to video record it at the request of the National Conference of Catholic Bishops.

The order donated one of two new radio transmitters to the Vatican in 1966; the other was donated by Cardinal Francis Spellman. In 1977, Bishop Andrew-Maria Deskur, president of the Pontifical Commission for Social Communications, requested funding for Radio Veritas, a program to broadcast religious programming to the one-quarter of the world's population living behind the Bamboo Curtain in atheistic communist countries.

The Knights have continued to support the Vatican's news operation for decades.

The Knights are major sponsors of the Eternal Word Television Network, the Association for Catholic Information, the Catholic News Agency, and Crux. According to John L. Allen Jr., Crux's editor, while the Knights sponsor a major portion of their budget, the order has no control over content.

== Military and veterans ==
Each year, the Knights bring veterans to Lourdes, France, as part of the International Military Pilgrimage to Our Lady's Shrine. In 2017, the order brought over 200 veterans through their Warriors to Lourdes program.

As part of the order's efforts to support seminarians, they partner with the Archdiocese for the Military Services to educate priests who will serve as military chaplains. The Knights have given over $2 million to the effort since its inception.

=== World War I ===
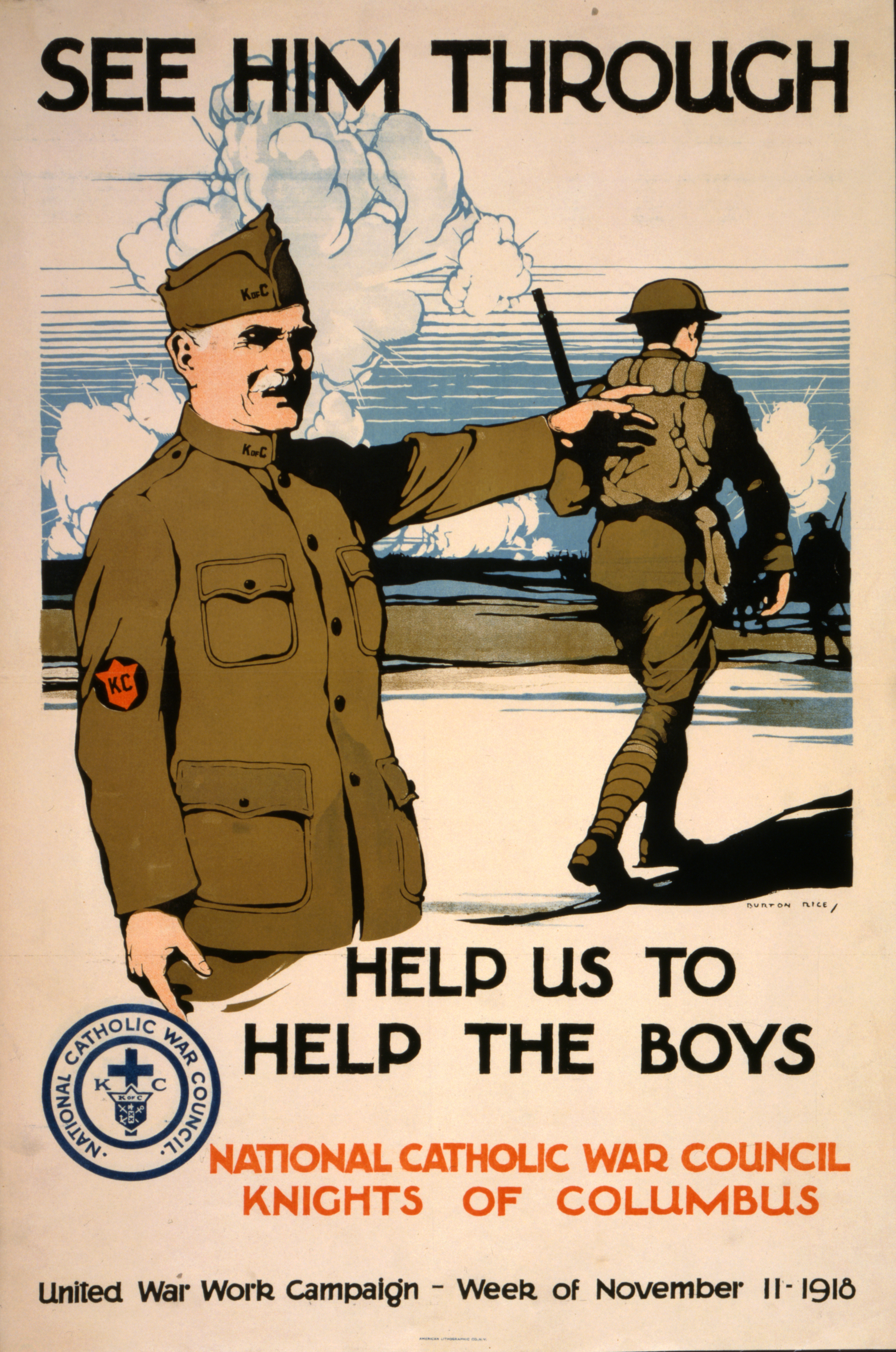
A Knights of Columbus poster from WWI

After the United States entered World War I, Supreme Knight James A. Flaherty proposed to U.S. President Woodrow Wilson that the Order establish soldiers' welfare centers in the U.S. and abroad. The organization already had experience, having provided similar services to troops encamped on the Mexican border during Pershing's expedition of 1916. Staff and chaplains were sent to every Army camp and cantonment.

With the slogan "Everyone Welcome, Everything Free," the "huts" became recreation/service centers for doughboys regardless of race or religion. They were staffed by "secretaries," commonly referred to as "Caseys" (for K of C) who were generally men above the age of military service. The centers provided basic amenities not readily available, such as stationery, hot baths, and religious services. One well-known "Casey" was major league baseball player Johnny Evers of ""Tinker-to-Evers-to-Chance," who traveled to France as a member of the Knights of Columbus to organize baseball games for the troops. A total of 260 buildings were erected and 1,134 secretaries, of which 1,075 were overseas, staffed them. In Europe, headquarters were established in London and Paris. The order continued this work until November 1919, at which point the effort was taken over by the federal government.

To pay for these huts and their staff, the order instituted a per capita tax on the membership to raise $1 million. Local councils undertook their own fundraising drives which resulted in an additional $14 million to support the effort. In 1918, just before the war ended, the Knights and other organizations undertook another effort to raise funds to support the welfare of the men fighting abroad. The amount apportioned to the order and the National Catholic War Council totaled $30 million which, when combined with earlier efforts, funded efforts to support troops both in the United States and overseas. After the war, the Knights became involved in education, occupational training, and employment programs for the returning troops.

=== World War II ===
Less than two weeks after the outbreak of World War II, on September 13, 1939, Canadian Supreme Director Claude Brown wired each Canadian state deputy to inform them of his plans to establish a welfare program comparable to the "huts" sponsored by the order during World War I. The Canadian government accepted his proposal by the end of October, and formed a unified organization including the Knights, the YMCA, the Salvation Army, and the Canadian Legion. Between December 1939 and April 1940, the Canadian Knights raised almost $230,000, "an extraordinary amount considering the fact that there were relatively few Knights in Canada."

In large cities, recreation centers were established, and morale programs were run in a number of training camps. Hostels were established for servicemen on furloughs first in Canada, then England, and eventually across Europe. Sporting events were organized, musical and comedy shows were produced, and even academic courses and a library were provided.

Recognizing the danger the volunteers who staffed these camps were undertaking, the Canadian government gave them a stipend equal to that of a captain in the Canadian Army and made them eligible for retirement and disability pay. F. O'Neil, who ran the Knights' recreation center in Hong Kong, was captured by the Japanese and was made a prisoner of war. Six volunteers, including Brown, died during the war.

Canadian Knights, and not the government, provided supplies for Catholic chaplains.

=== Armed with the Faith ===
Since 2004, the Knights have produced Armed with the Faith, a "virtually indestructible, waterproof, flip-top prayer [book], designed for use in the most rugged conditions, including hard battle." The books include prayers, information about the sacraments and holy days of obligation, and a primer on just war theory. It also includes reference material on the Church's teachings on the works of mercy and virtues. It closes with a number of classic hymns, a list of patron saints for the military, and the new Mass responses adopted in the United States in 2011.

== Growth and impact ==
There is, according to the National Catholic Reporter "hardly a corner of the Catholic world where the resources of this international force have not left an impression." The Order has donated funds to such varied causes as restoring Roman antiquities, purchasing the Pope John Paul II Cultural Center, and providing communications equipment to the Vatican to spread their message around the globe, in addition to numerous local charities and parishes.

This has allowed the Knights and its high-ranking officers to "become powerful and influential in ways unimaginable [at the Order's founding] in 1882 ... and no other lay group can match the Knights' ability to leave its mark on the church." According to Massimo Faggioli, the scope of the Knights' of philanthropy of can "create influence through money, especially in important places like Rome or Washington, D.C." The church has given honors and appointments to high ranking officials of the Knights, making their voices more prominent than other, poorer, Catholic organizations.

== Bibliography ==
- Kauffman, Christopher J. (1982). Faith and Fraternalism: The History of the Knights of Columbus, 1882–1982. Harper and Row. ISBN 978-0-06-014940-6.
- Sweany, Mark J. (1923). Educational Work of the Knights of Columbus. Bureau of Education Bulletin. Vol. 22. Washington: Government Printing Office. hdl:2346/60378.
- Lapomarda, Vincent A. (1992). The Knights of Columbus in Massachusetts (second ed.). Norwood, Massachusetts: Knights of Columbus Massachusetts State Council.
