= Francis X. Morrissey =

American judge

Judge of the Boston Municipal Court
- In office July 31, 1958 – May 21, 1980
- Preceded by: Frank W. Tomasello
- Succeeded by: Robert A. Mulligan

Personal details
- Born: Francis Xavier Morrissey; May 21, 1910 Boston, Massachusetts, US
- Died: December 27, 2007 (aged 97) Boston, Massachusetts, US
- Resting place: Holyhood Cemetery, Brookline, Massachusetts
- Party: Democratic
- Spouse: Frances (Kelley) Morrissey
- Children: 10
- Parents: Thomas Edward Morrissey (father); Johanna Nora (Powers) Morrissey (mother)
- Education: Suffolk University
- Profession: Attorney, judge
- Known for: Unsuccessful nomination to federal judgeship

Francis Xavier Morrissey (May 21, 1910 – December 27, 2007) was a Massachusetts attorney who served as a judge on the Boston Municipal Court from 1958 to 1980. Morrissey was John F. Kennedy's secretary when Kennedy served as a congressman and senator.

Because of his connection to Kennedy, President Lyndon B. Johnson in 1965 nominated Morrissey to be a judge on the United States District Court for the District of Massachusetts. The American Bar Association rated Morrissey unqualified for the Federal judgeship. Questions were raised about Morrissey's honesty with the Senate about his resume and his legal education, which included a Georgia diploma mill law degree. After strong criticism from the bar and the press, Morrissey asked President Johnson to withdraw the nomination. The Boston Globe in 1966 won the Pulitzer Prize for Public Service for its articles on Morrissey and his nomination to the Federal bench.

== Early life ==
Morrissey was born in Boston, Massachusetts, on May 21, 1910. He was one of twelve children of a stevedore, Thomas Edward Morrissey, and his wife, Johanna Nora Powers. Morrissey graduated from Charlestown High School in Boston. From 1927 to 1928, he was a clerk for the Employers Liability Assurance Company in Boston. He began attending the Suffolk University Law School as a part-time student in 1927. After he failed four core classes, he left Suffolk in January 1932 without receiving a degree. Morrissey sat for the bar examination in Massachusetts in 1932 but did not pass. Morrissey was a clerk and teller at the Atlantic National Bank in Boston from 1928 to 1932.

Morrissey went to Georgia in the summer of 1933 and received a law degree from a diploma mill, the Southern Law School in Athens, Georgia. The school required no study to graduate, Morrissey told the Senate Judiciary Committee. At that time, Georgia admitted attorneys without taking a bar examination and attorneys could be licensed on diploma privilege. Morrissey was admitted to practice in the Clarke County circuit court on September 7, 1933, the day he received his diploma. The next day he was admitted to practice by the Supreme Court of Georgia and the day after that in the United States District Court for the Northern District of Georgia. The Georgia law allowing for the diploma privilege was repealed in 1933.

During his Senate nomination hearing, Morrissey was questioned about how long he had spent in Georgia practicing law and whether he had been truthful in his application to the bar in stating he was a resident of that state. This was an issue in part because in 1934 Morrissey had unsuccessfully run for the Massachusetts legislature, a candidacy that required residency in the state as of January 1, 1934. Yet Morrissey testified to the Senate Judiciary Committee that he had lived in Georgia for at least six months after his graduation from the Southern Law School in September 1933. Morrissey finished twelfth of sixteen candidates in the September 20, 1934, primary for the Suffolk County Ward 2 seat in the Massachusetts House of Representatives, receiving 420 votes. Morrissey appeared in the 1933 and 1934 Boston city directories as living at 15 Prospect Street and working as a bank teller.

Morrissey was a social worker for the City of Boston from 1935 to 1938 when he joined the Massachusetts Department of Corrections in the same role. In June 1945, he was promoted to deputy commissioner of the Department of Corrections, serving until January 1947. During this same time, he was secretary to Governor Maurice J. Tobin.

While working for Governor Tobin, Morrissey met John F. Kennedy and his father, Ambassador Joseph P. Kennedy, at party for General George S. Patton. Morrissey said he encouraged Kennedy to run for the 11th District seat in the U.S. House of Representatives and Morrissey worked on his successful 1946 election campaign. Kennedy hired Morrissey as his secretary in to run his congressional district office in Boston. When Kennedy was elected to the United States Senate in 1952, Morrissey continued to work for him in the Senate.

Morrissey left Kennedy's Senate office when he became judge of the Boston Municipal Court in July 1958. Governor Foster Furcolo appointed Morrissey a judge on the recommendation of Senator Kennedy. He took the place of Frank W. Tomasello, who Governor Furcolo had appointed to the Massachusetts Superior Court.

Morrissey was appointed chairman of the board of the Federal Home Loan Bank of Boston in 1963 by Joseph P. McMurray, chairman of the Federal Home Loan Bank Board. He was reappointed in 1964 and 1965.

== Considered for Federal judgeship ==
Senator Kennedy was elected president in 1960. On May 16, 1961, President Kennedy signed a law creating a seventy-three new Federal judgeships, including a district court judgeship in Massachusetts.

Morrissey said of President Kennedy's father Joseph: "My association with him has been as intimate as any two men can conceivably have. Contrary to a popular misconception, Mr. Kennedy demanded–above everything else–loyalty and truth. He gave you equally as much in return. My admiration for him, for his keen intellect and for his brilliant mind knows no bounds." Ambassador Kennedy pressed for his son to nominate Morrissey to the new seat. Martin P. Nolan of The Boston Globe said Morrissey was “a very faithful retainer for Ambassador Kennedy.” William Chapman wrote in The Washington Post when the nomination was announced that it was “a cherished victory” for Ambassador Kennedy. The same article quoted an associate of President Kennedy saying that Morrissey “never let Joe Kennedy's coat hit the ground.” Reporter J. Anthony Lukas in his book on the Boston busing crisis, Common Ground, called Morrissey a “crony” of Ambassador Kennedy and “a ruddy-faced operator who knew his way around the seamy side of Boston politics” who was “Joe Kennedy's agent in his son's camp.” Morrissey “was a constant companion to” the elder Kennedy, “before and after his paralyzing stroke.”

Stories appeared in the press in 1961 stating President Kennedy was considering nominating Morrissey to be a federal judge. Robert F. Kennedy, the United States Attorney General, asked the American Bar Association for an informal review of Morrissey's qualifications for the Federal bench and was advised that the A.B.A. thought he was unqualified. When a formal report was requested on Morrissey, the A.B.A. came to the same conclusion. Albert Jenner, the chairman of the A.B.A.’s Committee on the Judiciary, in 1965 summed up the findings of the 1961 report: "Judge Morrissey was lacking in intellectual capacity to become an efficient judge of the U.S. District Court . . . . He was lacking in scholarship and legal knowledge; he lacked . . . legal experience, trial practice, and general practice of the law.". President Kennedy did not nominate Morrissey. As a consolation to Morrissey, Ambassador Kennedy offered to set up a substantial trust fund to benefit Morrissey's children.

Edward and Joan Kennedy vacationed on Capri with Morrissey and his wife in the summer of 1961. Morrissey accompanied Kennedy throughout Massachusetts in 1962 as part of his successful campaign for election to the Senate that year. Morrissey was one of only two people not members of the Kennedy family present at the August 1963 funeral of President Kennedy's son Patrick, the other being Cardinal Francis Spellman.

== Nominated to the Federal bench ==
Morrissey told friends that just before his assassination President Kennedy had promised to nominate him to the Federal bench after the 1964 election. President Kennedy's brother Senator Edward M. Kennedy successfully lobbied President Johnson to make the nomination. Senator Kennedy told Burton Hersh that “Frank had a great desire to go on the federal court” and that Morrissey's wife “was very insistent” on the nomination. President Johnson nominated Morrissey on September 28, 1965. Senator Kennedy fought hard for Morrissey:

Edward Kennedy wanted the nomination for Morrissey with all his heart, whatever the reasons. Morrissey had served the Kennedys, father, John, and Edward, long and well. Whether out of personal gratitude, respect for his father, sincere admiration and respect for Morrissey, or what is more likely, a combination of all these elements, Senator Edward Kennedy fought prodigiously for Judge Morrissey's appointment.

Robert F. Kennedy, elected a Senator from New York in 1964, also supported the nomination of Morrissey, who journalist and Kennedy friend Jack Newfield called “an unqualified family crony.” As attorney general, Robert Kennedy had asked Johnson to nominate Morrissey. Arthur M. Schlesinger wrote in his biography of Robert Kennedy that Johnson nominated Morrissey as a trap to embarrass both Edward and Robert Kennedy. Other observers doubted that. Schlesinger quoted Johnson as telling J. Edgar Hoover, the director of the Federal Bureau of Investigation, that he wanted a thorough investigation of Morrissey because “I don't want him to get that judgeship.” (Note: For this quotation, Schlesinger cited a 1976 interview with William C. Sullivan, deputy director of the F.B.I. from 1961 to 1971, when J. Edgar Hoover fired him. Johnson had died in 1973, Hoover in 1972, and Sullivan in 1977, the year before Schlesinger's book was published.)

The New York Times editorialized that Morrissey "has no visible qualifications except for a long, close friendship" with Ambassador Kennedy. "He has never had any private practice worth mentioning, having always made his living off minor political jobs. When he was appointed to a municipal judgeship in Boston several years ago, his legal qualifications for even that judicial post were questioned." A second Times editorial called him “preposterously unqualified” whose nomination advanced only because of the “familial arrogance” of the Kennedy family. Morrissey's nomination was “unconscionable,” said The New Republic, as “absolutely nothing is publicly known of Mr. Morrissey that remotely fits him for the federal bench.” The Christian Science Monitor editorialized against Morrissey, stating “his experience is far too limited.”The New York Herald-Tribune editorialized that the nomination was “nauseous.” Baltimore's The Sun asked in an editorial if the word for Morrissey was “liar” or “fibber.” Tom Wicker, writing in the Times, said “no one could seriously contend that he had any professional qualifications for a judgeship.” Morrissey did not even “r[i]se to the level of mediocrity,” wrote James Reston. Fellow columnist Marquis Childs said Morrissey was “obviously unqualified.”

The Senate Judiciary Committee held a hearing in October 1965. Morrissey's nomination was endorsed by John McCormack, speaker of the United States House of Representatives; Jacob J. Spiegel, a justice of the Massachusetts Supreme Judicial Court; and Cardinal Richard Cushing, Archbishop of Boston. Columnists Rowland Evans and Bob Novak wrote that Speaker McCormack offered his support not from enthusiasm over Morrissey but to get Ted Kennedy's support for McCormack's nephew Edward in his race to be elected governor of Massachusetts. Judge Charles Edward Wyzanski, who sat on the U.S. District Court in Massachusetts, wrote the Judiciary Committee in opposition to Morrissey, saying he “has neither the familiarity with the law nor the industry to learn it.” The American Bar Association again found Morrissey unqualified to be a Federal judge. The Massachusetts Bar Association had twice found Morrissey to be unqualified before doing an about-face.

The A.B.A.’s Albert Jenner testified that an investigation of Morrissey could find almost no evidence that he had tried cases in state or Federal court or that he had briefed or argued appeals in Massachusetts. Under questioning from Senator Everett M. Dirksen, the Republican leader in the Senate, Morrissey admitted that his docket as municipal court judge was largely misdemeanor cases such as driving under the influence and small civil cases. His court also had no jurisdiction to hear jury cases. Morrissey was questioned about his 1933 Georgia diploma and law license. Morrissey also testified that he had attended an evening law school program at Boston College that was found not to have existed.

The Senate Judiciary Committee issued a favorable report on Morrissey. The vote was nine to three in favor of Morrissey, with Senators James O. Eastland, Quentin Burdick, Thomas J. Dodd, Philip Hart, and Edward Kennedy voting for Morrissey and Senators Dirksen, Hugh Scott, and Sam Ervin voting against. Not voting were Senators John L. McClellan, Jacob Javits, Hiram Fong, Edward V. Long, Birch Bayh, and Joseph Tydings.

Because of questions about Morrissey's whereabouts in Georgia in 1933, Attorney General Nicholas Katzenbach had the F.B.I. quickly investigate and wrote to Senator Eastland, chairman of the Judiciary Committee that Morrissey had spent months in Georgia at the time. Leverett Saltonstall, the other United States Senator from Massachusetts, withdrew his support from Morrissey because of the questions about the nominee's background raised at the hearing and asked for further investigation. The Boston Globe found that Morrissey had registered to vote in Boston in July 1933, which was at a time he testified he was studying law in Georgia.

Senator Kennedy on October 21 passionately defended Morrissey on the Senate floor stating that the American Bar Association opposed Morrissey out of snobbery because he could not afford to attend law school full-time during the Great Depression. “He was young and he was poor, one of twelve children, his father a dock worker, the family living in a home without gas, electricity or heat in the bedroom. Their shoes held together with wooden pegs their father made. As a child of this family, Judge Morrissey could not afford to study law full-time.” But Kennedy surprised the Senate by then ending the fight for his confirmation by sending the nomination back to the Judiciary Committee. While Kennedy may have been able to force Morrissey's confirmation through the Senate, it would have hurt him politically to do so.

President Johnson then withdrew the nomination at Morrissey's request, writing Johnson that he wanted to withdraw “to prevent further anguish to my family and further harassment to you and to those who supported me so loyally.” Columnist Drew Pearson said Senator Kennedy “snafued his reputation by putting family cronies ahead of public trust.”

President Johnson in 1966 nominated W. Arthur Garrity, U.S. Attorney for the District of Massachusetts, to the judgeship Morrissey had been nominated for. Garrity was confirmed. For its reporting on the Morrissey nomination, The Boston Globe in 1966 won the Pulitzer Prize for Public Service.

== Later life ==
Despite the failed nomination, Morrissey remained close to the Kennedy family. In May 1967, he went with them to Newport News, Virginia, for Jacqueline Kennedy and Caroline Kennedy to christen the aircraft carrier John F. Kennedy. The day after Robert Kennedy was shot, Morrissey drove with Archbishop Cushing from Boston to Hyannisport to visit Joseph and Rose Kennedy.

Morrissey was censured in 1974 by the Supreme Judicial Court of Massachusetts. Morrissey in 1967 had accepted $4,000 from Massachusetts businessman Edward Krock, who was being investigated by the U.S. Securities and Exchange Commission at the time of the payment. Morrissey then contacted the United States Attorney's Office to inquire about Krock's securities case. The payment from Krock, a large contributor to Kennedy political campaigns, was revealed by The Boston Globe’s Spotlight investigative reporting team in May 1973. The prior month Krock had been indicted for Federal income tax evasion; he never went to trial as he lived the rest of his life in the Bahamas, from which he could not be extradited. The Supreme Judicial Court said Morrissey had “a careless disregard of the requirement that a judge's conduct be such as to avoid even the appearance of impropriety.”

Morrissey retired from the Boston Municipal Court in May 1980 when he reached the mandatory retirement age of seventy. Governor Edward J. King in July 1980 nominated Robert A. Mulligan to replace Morrissey.

== Personal life ==
Morrissey and his wife, Frances Kelly, had ten children, three of whom died in infancy.

Morrissey's oldest son, Francis X. Morrissey, Jr., was an attorney. Francis Jr. was suspended from the bar in 1995 over his conduct in an admiralty case and disbarred in 2009 after being convicted of felonies involving the will of philanthropist Brooke Astor.

President Kennedy was the godfather of Morrissey's son Joseph P. Morrissey's youngest son Richard Cushing Morrissey, named for the Archbishop of Boston, was the first child to be baptized live on television. Cardinal Cushing performed the baptism. Morrissey's other children were Maryann (Morrissey) Curtin, Thomas Morrissey, Clare (Morrissey) Ahern, and Catherine Morrissey.

Morrisey was a Roman Catholic and active in the church. He was made a knight of the Order of the Holy Sepulchre in 1959 and a knight of the Order of St. Gregory the Great in 1963. He was a trustee of the Joseph P. Kennedy, Jr. Memorial Hospital (now known as Franciscan Hospital for Children), the John F. Kennedy Library, and the Lahey Clinic.

Morrissey died at Massachusetts General Hospital in Boston on December 27, 2007. He was buried in Holyhood Cemetery in Brookline, Massachusetts.

== Notes ==
Legal offices
Preceded by Frank W. Tomasello	Justice of the Boston Municipal Court; 1958-1980	Succeeded by Robert A. Mulligan
