= Frank W. Tomasello =

American judge

Frank W. Tomasello (March 7, 1900 – March 12, 1986) was an American judge.

== Personal life ==
Tomasello was born to Italian immigrants Antonio Tomasello and Rosaria (born: Bonnano). His father started a successful contracting firm and Tomasello was the only son not to follow his father into the construction business, which was taken over by his brother Joseph A. Tomasello. He graduated from The English High School in 1917 and then studied Latin at Boston College. He earned a Bachelor of Laws degree from Boston University in 1921. Tomasello served in the United States Army during World War I.

A veteran, he spoke out against the abuse of servicemen, and was a supporter of the Legion of Decency.

== Career ==
Tomasello was admitted to the bar in 1921 and began his career in the office of Francis J. W. Ford. In 1923 he was admitted to the federal bar. In 1925 he opened his own office on Tremont Street. He served as defense counsel during the 1934 Berrett-Molway murder trial and was an attorney for the Home Owners' Loan Corporation. In 1935, Ford, then serving as United States Attorney for the District of Massachusetts, made Tomasello an assistant U.S. attorney. He also worked as an aide to Governor Charles F. Hurley who later appointed him as a judge on the Boston Municipal Court in 1937. In 1958 he was appointed a judge of the Massachusetts Superior Court by Foster Furcolo. He was considered for a position on the federal bench by President John F. Kennedy but asked the president not to appoint him lest it appear too political.

In 1970, during the Vietnam War, he ordered a 17-year-old girl to carry the American flag from Harvard Square to the Middlesex Courthouse and back instead of going to jail for burning the flag. He also served on the Massachusetts State Board of Education with fellow State Deputy and future Supreme Knight of the Knights of Columbus John W. McDevitt.

== Knights of Columbus ==
As a Knight of Columbus, he rose through the ranks of North Quincy Council and served one term as their grand knight. He then rose through the state council chairs and was elected the first Italian State Deputy in 1942. As State Deputy, he organized a war bond drive during World War II. It raised enough money for the Army to buy eight bombers, including one which was named "Massachusetts State Council, Knights of Columbus."

Tomasello also help stop the legalization of birth control in Massachusetts during the 1942 election. He stepped down as State Deputy in 1944.

== Death ==
Tomasello died on March 12, 1986, and is buried in Holyhood Cemetery in Brookline, Massachusetts.

Legal offices
| Preceded by Michael J. Murray | Justice of the Boston Municipal Court; 1937-1958 | Succeeded by Francis X. Morrissey |
