= Iraq and Syria Genocide Relief and Accountability Act of 2018 =

Law to provide humanitarian relief to victims of the genocide perpetrated by ISIS

- Long title: An act to provide relief for victims of genocide, crimes against humanity, and war crimes who are members of religious and ethnic minority groups in Iraq and Syria, for accountability for perpetrators of these crimes, and for other purposes.
- Announced in: the 115th United States Congress
- Sponsored by: Chris Smith, Anna Eshoo
- Number of co-sponsors: 47

Citations
- Public law: Pub. L. 115–300 (text) (PDF)

Legislative history
- Introduced in the -House as H.R. 390 by Chris Smith (R–NJ) and Anna Eshoo (D–CA) on January 10, 2017; Signed into law by President Donald Trump on December 11, 2018

The Iraq and Syria Genocide Relief and Accountability Act of 2018 (Pub. L. 115–300 (text) (PDF)) is a law to provide humanitarian relief to victims of the genocide perpetrated by the Islamic State of Iraq and the Levant (ISIS) during the Syrian and Iraqi Civil Wars. It also holds ISIS accountable as perpetrators of genocide.

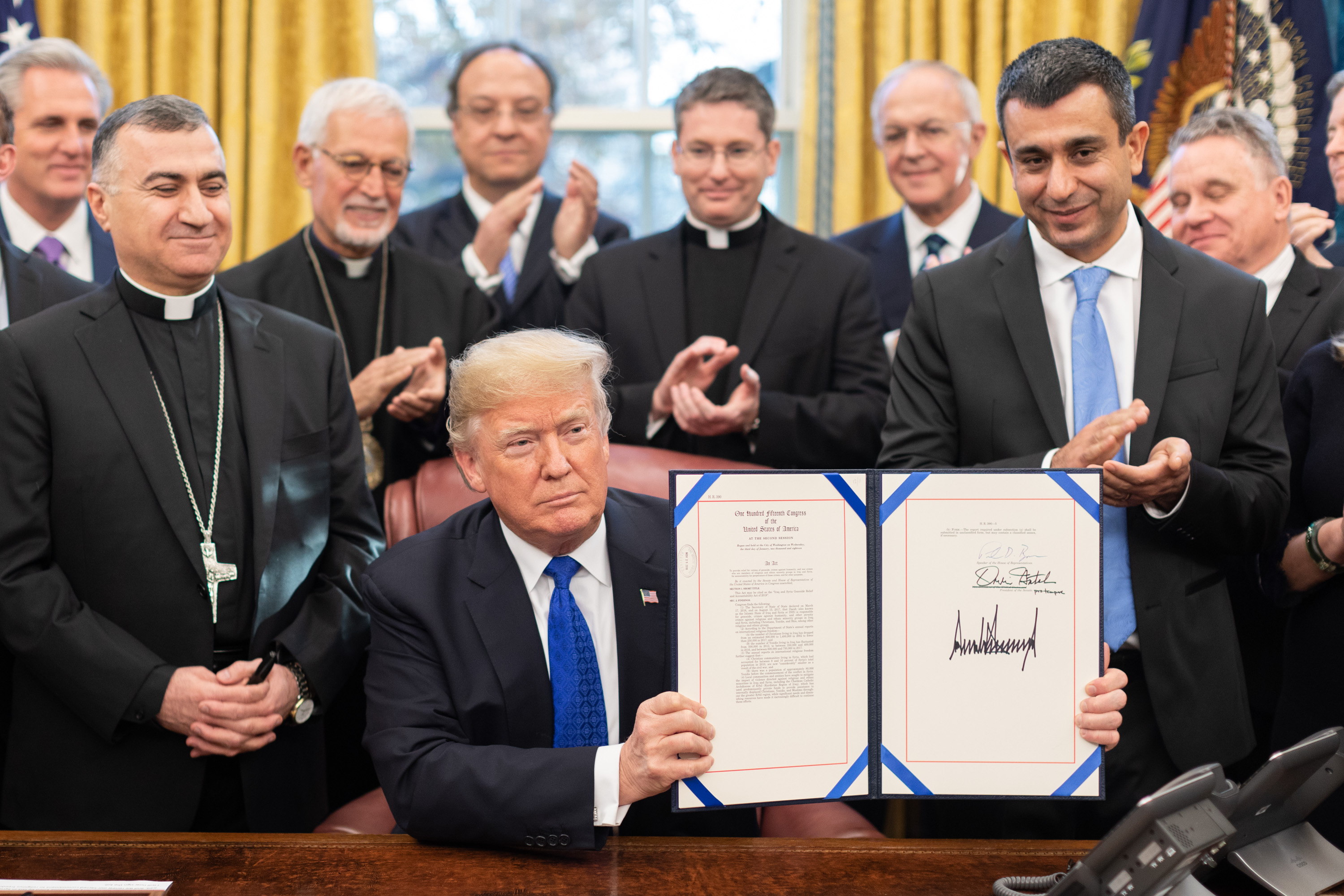
President Trump signs the Iraq and Syria Genocide Relief and Accountability Act into law.

According to Representative Chris Smith, who introduced the bill with Representative Anna Eshoo, the "blueprint for the legislation" was testimony provided by Supreme Knight of the Knights of Columbus Carl A. Anderson before Congress in 2016. Smith praised the Knights as "unflagging supporters of the bill."

== See also ==
- Political activity of the Knights of Columbus
