= Maloy, Iowa =

- City
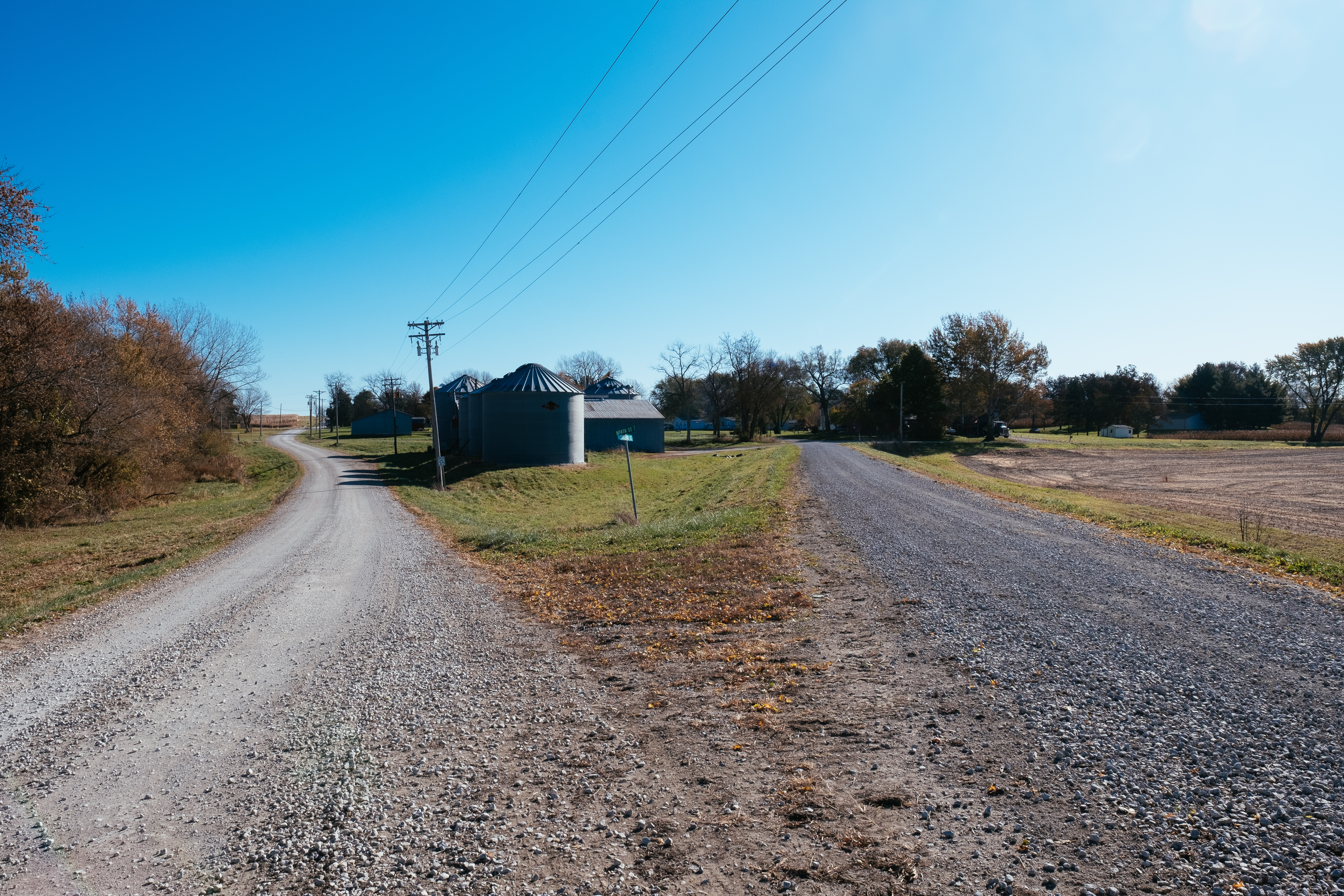
- View from the west

- Location of Maloy, Iowa
- Coordinates: 40°40′23″N 94°24′43″W
- Country: USA
- State: Iowa
- County: Ringgold

Area
  - Total: 0.63 sq mi (1.62 km^{2})
  - Land: 0.62 sq mi (1.61 km^{2})
  - Water: 0.0039 sq mi (0.01 km^{2})
- Elevation: 1,119 ft (341 m)

Population (2020)
  - Total: 22
  - Density: 35.4/sq mi (13.68/km^{2})
- Time zone: UTC-6 (Central (CST))
  - Summer (DST): UTC-5 (CDT)
- ZIP code: 50836
- Area code: 641
- FIPS code: 19-48675
- GNIS feature ID: 2395824

Maloy is a city in southwest Ringgold County, Iowa, United States, along the Little Platte River. The population was 22 at the time of the 2020 census.

== History ==
Settlement of the western part of Ringgold County began in the 1850s. Maloy was platted in 1887, in the same year as the railroad arrived. Maloy was incorporated as a city in 1901. In 1917, the two-story brick Maloy High School was built; after serving from 1920 to 1952, it became an elementary school in the Mount Ayr Community School District.

A major fire on June 17, 1931, razed the Catholic Church, five businesses, a house, and a barn. The school closed in 1972 and was torn down in 1987. The railroad, which once offered both freight and passenger service, was dismantled in 1985.

== Geography ==
Maloy is on Iowa County Road J43 approximately ten miles west-southwest of Mount Ayr. The Little Platte River flows past the west side of the community.

According to the United States Census Bureau, the city has a total area of 0.62 square miles (1.61 km^{2}), all land.

== Demographics ==
Historical populations
Year	Pop.	±%
1910	127	—
1920	121	−4.7%
1930	112	−7.4%
1940	95	−15.2%
1950	90	−5.3%
1960	68	−24.4%
1970	45	−33.8%
1980	38	−15.6%
1990	36	−5.3%
2000	28	−22.2%
2010	29	+3.6%
2020	22	−24.1%
Source:"U.S. Census website". United States Census Bureau. and Iowa Data Center; Source: U.S. Decennial Census

=== 2020 census ===
As of the census of 2020, there were 22 people, 13 households, and 11 families residing in the city. The population density was 35.4 inhabitants per square mile (13.7/km^{2}). There were 14 housing units at an average density of 22.5 per square mile (8.7/km^{2}). The racial makeup of the city was 100.0% White, 0.0% Black or African American, 0.0% Native American, 0.0% Asian, 0.0% Pacific Islander, 0.0% from other races and 0.0% from two or more races. Hispanic or Latino persons of any race comprised 0.0% of the population.

Of the 13 households, 46.2% of which had children under the age of 18 living with them, 46.2% were married couples living together, 15.4% were cohabiting couples, 23.1% had a female householder with no spouse or partner present and 15.4% had a male householder with no spouse or partner present. 15.4% of all households were non-families. 15.4% of all households were made up of individuals, 7.7% had someone living alone who was 65 years old or older.

The median age in the city was 49.5 years. 13.6% of the residents were under the age of 20; 0.0% were between the ages of 20 and 24; 27.3% were from 25 and 44; 36.4% were from 45 and 64; and 22.7% were 65 years of age or older. The gender makeup of the city was 59.1% male and 40.9% female.

=== 2010 census ===
As of the census of 2010, there were 29 people in 12 households, including 10 families, in the city. The population density was 46.8 inhabitants per square mile (18.1/km^{2}). There were 15 housing units at an average density of 24.2 per square mile (9.3/km^{2}). The racial makup of the city was 100.0% White.

Of the 12 households 33.3% had children under the age of 18 living with them, 75.0% were married couples living together, 8.3% had a male householder with no wife present, and 16.7% were non-families. 16.7% of households were one person and 8.3% were one person aged 65 or older. The average household size was 2.42 and the average family size was 2.60.

The median age was 42.5 years. 20.7% of residents were under the age of 18; 13.7% were between the ages of 18 and 24; 24% were from 25 to 44; 20.5% were from 45 to 64; and 20.7% were 65 or older. The gender makeup of the city was 62.1% male and 37.9% female.

=== 2000 census ===
As of the census of 2000, there were 28 people in 10 households, including 7 families, in the city. The population density was 45.1 inhabitants per square mile (17.4/km^{2}). There were 11 housing units at an average density of 17.7 per square mile (6.9/km^{2}). The racial makup of the city was 100.00% White.

Of the 10 households 50.0% had children under the age of 18 living with them, 50.0% were married couples living together, 10.0% had a female householder with no husband present, and 30.0% were non-families. 20.0% of households were one person and 10.0% were one person aged 65 or older. The average household size was 2.80 and the average family size was 3.29.

The age distribution was 32.1% under the age of 18, 7.1% from 18 to 24, 28.6% from 25 to 44, 14.3% from 45 to 64, and 17.9% 65 or older. The median age was 36 years. For every 100 females, there were 86.7 males. For every 100 females age 18 and over, there were 90.0 males.

The median income for a household in the city is $36,250, and the median family income was $13,750. Males had a median income of $16,250 versus $11,875 for females. The per capita income for the city was $10,386. There were 50.0% of families and 42.9% of the population living below the poverty line, including 55.6% of under eighteens and none of those over 64.

== Education ==
Mount Ayr Community School District operates public schools serving the community.

== Notable person ==
- Luke E. Hart, tenth Supreme Knight of the Knights of Columbus
