= William Chapman (journalist) =

American journalist (1930–2019)

William T. Chapman (December 12, 1930 – March 29, 2019) was an American journalist. He began as a reporter in 1956, and joined The Washington Post in 1960. He was assigned by the Post to Tokyo as their bureau chief in 1977, and is the author of Inside the Philippine Revolution (1988) and Inventing Japan: The Making of a Postwar Civilization (1991).

Chapman obtained a BA from DePauw University and an MA in political science from New York University.

Chapman died at his home in Weston, Vermont, on March 29, 2019, at the age of 88.
