= Luke E. Hart =

10th Supreme Knight of the Knights of Columbus

Luke Edward Hart GCSG
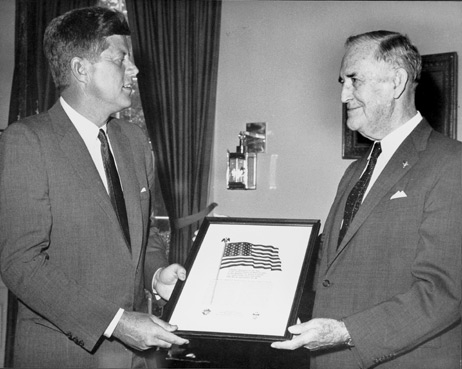
- President John F. Kennedy and Luke E. Hart in 1961

10th Supreme Knight of the Knights of Columbus
- In office September 1, 1953 – February 19, 1964
- Preceded by: John E. Swift
- Succeeded by: John W. McDevitt

Personal details
- Born: July 31, 1880 Maloy, Iowa, U.S.
- Died: February 19, 1964 (aged 83) New Haven, Connecticut, U.S.
- Spouse: Catherine J. Hart (née O'Connor)
- Children: 6
- Education: Drake University (AB); University of Missouri (LLB)

Luke Edward Hart GCSG (July 31, 1880 – February 19, 1964) was the tenth Supreme Knight of the Knights of Columbus, serving from September 1, 1953, until his death on February 19, 1964.

== Personal life ==
Hart was born in 1880 in Maloy, Iowa. He set up his office in St. Louis where he practiced law and later was an alderman. He received an undergraduate degree from Drake University and a law degree from the University of Missouri. In 1905, he married Catherine J. O'Connor, who predeceased him; they had six children, two of whom predeceased him. From 1934-38, he was the president and general counsel of the Hamilton-Brown Shoe Company.

== Career ==
=== National leader ===
Hart was a delegate to Republican National Convention from Missouri in 1940. During World War I, he was a member of the executive committee of the United War Work campaign. He helped to found the United Service Organizations and the Boys Club of St. Louis. Hart was also a member of the board of the St. Louis Catholic Orphan Board.

=== Knights of Columbus ===
Hart was elected Supreme Advocate of the Knights of Columbus in 1922 and was Supreme Knight of the Knights of Columbus from 1954-63. He was awarded the Star of Morocco in 1920 after leading a delegation of Knights who presented a statue of Lafayette to the French people. He was made a Knight Grand Cross of the Order of St. Gregory the Great in 1927, and a knight commander in 1939. He was awarded entry into the Order of St. Raymond of Peñafort in Spain and made a Secret Chamberlain of Cape and Sword in 1951.

He attended the coronation of Pope John XXIII. In 1951, Hart was elected president of the National Fraternal Congress. By the end of the 1950s Supreme Knight Hart was actively encouraging councils to accept black candidates. It was during Hart's tenure in 1954 that the Knights petitioned to get "under God" inserted into the Pledge of Allegiance.

== Death ==
Hart died on February 19, 1964, at St. Raphael's Hospital in New Haven, Connecticut.

Religious titles
Preceded by John E. Swift	Supreme Knight of the Knights of Columbus; 1953 – 1964	Succeeded by John W. McDevitt
Preceded by Joseph C. Pelletier	Supreme Advocate of the Knights of Columbus; 1922 – 1953	Succeeded by Harold J. Lamboley
