= John W. McDevitt =

11th Supreme Knight of the Knights of Columbus

Doctor John McDevitt GCPO KCSG

11th Supreme Knight of the Knights of Columbus
- In office February 22, 1964 – January 21, 1977
- Preceded by: Luke E. Hart
- Succeeded by: Virgil C. Dechant

16th Deputy Supreme Knight of the Knights of Columbus
- In office 1960 – 1964

Personal details
- Born: December 27, 1906 Malden, Massachusetts, U.S.
- Died: December 6, 1994 (aged 87) New Haven, Connecticut, U.S.
- Spouse: Mary Cecilia McDevitt (née Kelley)
- Children: John Kelley McDevitt; William Paul McDevitt
- Education: Boston College (AB, MA)

John W. McDevitt GCPO KCSG (December 28, 1906 – December 6, 1994) was the eleventh Supreme Knight of the Knights of Columbus from 1964 to 1977.

== Early life and education ==
Born in Malden, Massachusetts on December 27, 1906, McDevitt was the son of James F. McDevitt and Margaret Agnes (née Sullivan). He attended Immaculate Conception School and then Boston College High School. He earned both a bachelor's and a master's degree from Boston College in 1928 and 1929, respectively.

== Career ==
=== Educator ===
McDevitt taught history at Lincoln Junior High School in Malden, and was then made principal on December 17, 1935. Shortly thereafter, elections were held and a new School Committee was elected. The new Committee rescinded his appointment on January 26, 1936. McDevitt sued, and the case was dismissed by the Supreme Judicial Court in 1937.

On August 22, 1942, he was made superintendent of Waltham Public Schools. He served in this position until December 7, 1961, when he resigned to focus on his work as Deputy Supreme Knight of the Knights of Columbus. The School Street Middle School was named after him in Waltham. He was nominated to the state Board of Education in 1951 and served for nine years. He served on that board with fellow State Deputy Frank W. Tomasello.

=== Knights of Columbus ===
In 1932, McDevitt joined the Santa Maria Council of the Knights of Columbus in Malden. He held several positions, including serving as grand knight twice. He then rose through the chairs of the state council and was made State Deputy of Massachusetts on May 11, 1948.

McDevitt was largely responsible for getting a law passed by the Great and General Court of Massachusetts allowing fraternal societies such as the Knights of Columbus to sell insurance in the Commonwealth. It was signed by Governor Paul A. Dever, a past grand knight from the Mt. Pleasant Council in West Roxbury. McDevitt also played a role in the defeat of the legalization of birth control in the 1948 referendum.

He was made Master of the Fourth Degree in Massachusetts in 1952 and a Supreme Director in 1955. On October 21, 1960, he was elected Deputy Supreme Knight and on February 22, 1964, he became the 11th Supreme Knight. As Supreme Knight, he ended discrimination against black people in 1964 and asked the Supreme Council to consider admitting women in 1969.

By 1970, some states had legalized abortion. McDevitt responded to this trend at the 1970 convention, defining the Knights as an anti-abortion organization. He said, "We, the knights of today, likewise must serve in the role of protectors...we must be the knights who hold up the banner of life. We must be for life." In 1973, after the Roe v. Wade ruling, the Supreme Convention passed a resolution supporting an anti-abortion constitutional amendment. McDevitt denounced Roe v. Wade as "shocking and unfortunate", and urged councils to take local action to "offset the harmful effects of this lamentable decision." In 1975, the Knights donated $50,000 to the US bishops in support of anti-abortion efforts.

== Honors ==
In 1971, McDevitt was honored by Pope Paul VI with the Order of Pius IX, the highest papal honor which can be conferred on a Catholic layman who is not a head of state. Pope Paul also placed McDevitt on the advisory board for Vatican City and gave him several other honors. He also won the 1966 Brotherhood Award from B'Nai B'rith.

McDevitt held honorary degrees from Saint Michael's College, The Catholic University of America, and Boston College.

== Personal life ==
With his wife Mary Cecilia Kelley McDevitt, he had two sons, John Kelley McDevitt and William Paul McDevitt. John Kelley became assistant Supreme Advocate in 1975.

In 1998, after his death, the delegates at the Supreme Council meeting established a scholarship fund in his name.

== Works cited ==
- Lapomarda, Vincent A. (1992). The Knights of Columbus in Massachusetts (second ed.). Norwood, Massachusetts: Knights of Columbus Massachusetts State Council.

Religious titles
Preceded by Luke E. Hart	Supreme Knight of the Knights of Columbus; 1964-1977	Succeeded by Virgil C. Dechant
