= President's Organization for Unemployment Relief =

The President's Organization for Unemployment Relief (originally known as the President's Emergency Committee for Employment) was a government organization created on August 19, 1931, by United States President Herbert Hoover. Its commission was to help U.S. citizens who lost their jobs due to the Great Depression. Its purpose was to coordinate local welfare agencies, without spending government money. The program ended on June 30, 1932. Its ending was because the government was not willing to help the agencies through the aid of money and this therefore led to them becoming simply overwhelmed by the magnitude of the problem of the Great Depression.

Following its creation, Martin Carmody, the Supreme Knight of the Knights of Columbus, wrote to Hoover pledging the services of the Order. Carmody had already encouraged the 2,600 councils to have "strong and active employment committees." By the end of July 1931, a total a 43,128 unemployed people had been placed into jobs, in addition to those placements made by local councils who were working under the auspices of other organizations. In less than two years, the Order would provide more than 100,000 jobs. In October of that year, Hoover appointed Carmody to the Organization for Unemployment Relief.

== Bibliography ==
- Kauffman, Christopher J. (1982). Faith and Fraternalism: The History of the Knights of Columbus, 1882–1982. Harper and Row. ISBN 978-0-06-014940-6.
