= History of the Knights of Columbus =

The history of the Knights of Columbus begins with its founding in 1882 by Father Michael J. McGivney at St. Mary's Parish in New Haven, Connecticut, United States. The Knights of Columbus was initially a mutual benefit society for a membership of practicing male Catholics. Today, it advocates for Catholic causes and provides a range of philanthropic and support services to Catholic institutions worldwide. It is also one of the world's largest insurance companies and operates the shrine to Pope John Paul II in Washington, D.C.

The order was designed to foster members' pride in both their Catholic and American heritages and to establish standards of behavior for Catholic gentlemen. It expanded beyond Connecticut and the United States to establish its first international councils by 1905. The organization provided relief to soldiers in wars throughout the 20th century and fought anti-Catholic and racial prejudice. Its substantial membership and financial resources have enabled it to exercise considerable influence within the Catholic church and to promote Catholic views in social and political discourse.

== Early history ==
=== Founding ===
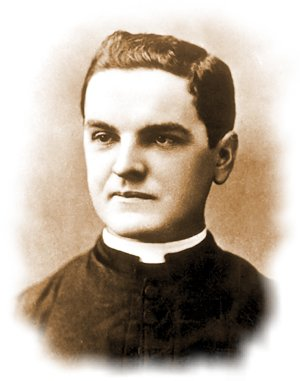
Michael J. McGivney, founder of the Knights of Columbus

Michael J. McGivney, an American Catholic priest, founded the Knights of Columbus in New Haven, Connecticut. He gathered a group of men from St. Mary's Parish for an organizational meeting on October 2, 1881. It was incorporated on March 29, 1882. McGivney had originally conceived of the name "Sons of Columbus". James T. Mullen, who later led the organization, coined the name "Knights of Columbus", which expressed the ritualistic nature of the new organization and drew from positive historical associations.

The Order was intended to be a mutual benefit society. As a parish priest in an immigrant community, McGivney saw what could happen to a family when the main income earner died. This was before most government support programs were established. He wanted to provide insurance to care for the widows and orphans left behind. In his own life, he temporarily had to suspend his seminary studies to care for his family after his father died.

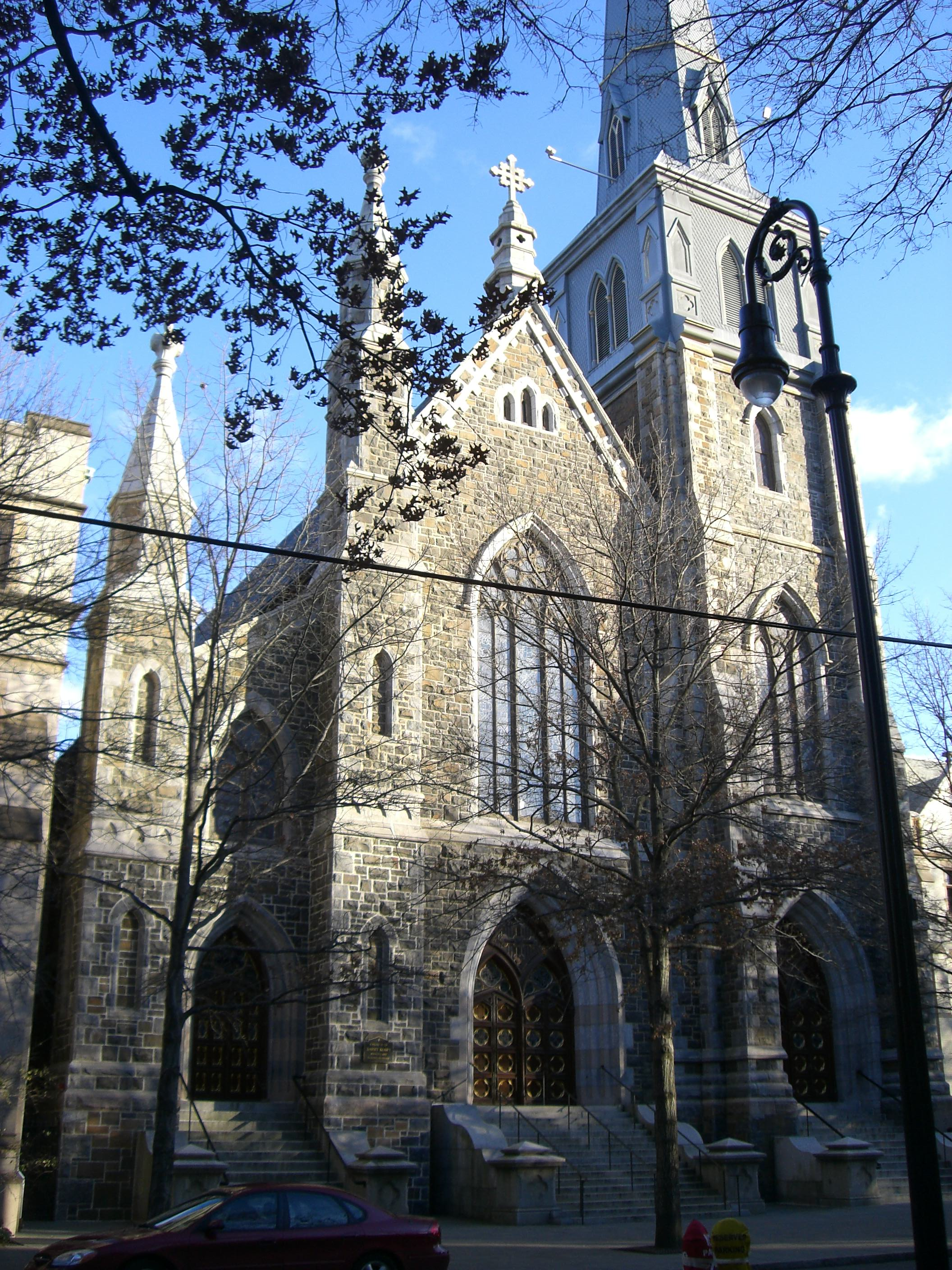
St. Mary's Church

Because of religious and ethnic discrimination, Roman Catholics in the late 19th century were regularly excluded from labor unions, popular fraternal organizations, and other organized groups that provided such social services. Papal encyclicals issued by the Holy See also prohibited Catholics from participating as lodge members within Freemasonry. McGivney intended to create an alternative organization. He also believed that Catholicism and fraternalism were compatible and wanted to found a society to encourage men to be proud of their American–Catholic heritage.

Fraternal organizations, which combined social aspects and ritual, were especially flourishing during the latter third of the nineteenth century, the so-called "Golden Age of Fraternalism. New Haven's Irish Catholic men of the era could have joined one of many other organizations, (Note: For example, the Knights of St. Patrick, the Ancient Order of Hibernians, the Friendly Sons of St. Patrick, the Sons of Erin, the Catholic Order of Foresters, the Red Knights, the Irish Catholic Benevolent Union, the Hibernian Society, the Catholic Benevolent League, the Ancient Order of Foresters, the St. Vincent's Death Benefit League, any number of local parish total abstinence societies.) and Catholics of other ethnicities had additional options.

McGivney traveled to Boston to examine the Massachusetts Catholic Order of Foresters and to Brooklyn, New York to learn about the recently established Catholic Benevolent League, both of which offered insurance benefits. He found the latter to be lacking the excitement he thought was needed if his organization were to compete with the secret societies of the day. He explored establishing a New Haven Court of the Foresters, but the group's charter in Massachusetts limited them to operating within that Commonwealth. McGivney's committee of St. Mary's parishioners decided to form a new club.

=== Catholic and American ===
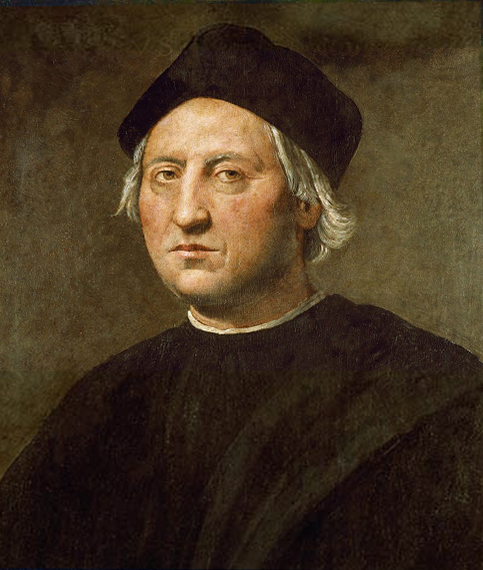
Christopher Columbus is the patron and namesake of the Knights.

Taking the name of Columbus was partially intended as a mild rebuke to Anglo-Saxon Protestant leaders, who upheld the explorer (a Genovese Italian Catholic who had worked for Catholic Spain) as an American hero, yet simultaneously sought to marginalize recent Catholic immigrants. In taking Columbus as their patron, the founders expressed their belief that not only could Catholics be full members of American society, they were instrumental in its foundation.

Of the first 28 members of the first council, 16 were born in Ireland. A majority of the first generation of Knights across the Order were immigrants. Joining the Knights gave the recent immigrants a mantle of "middle-class American respectability without forfeiting their preexisting ethnic and religious identities", and gave them "a rhetorical foundation for claims to full American citizenship".

Unlike many other Catholic organizations of the time, though, the Knights placed a greater emphasis on loyalty to their new world republics than they did on old ethnic divisions of the old world. McGivney envisioned an organization that would imbue members "with a zealous pride in one's American–Catholic heritage". In Canada, a similar sentiment held among early members.

The model of Christian knighthood promoted by the Order "provided Catholic men with a positive interpretation of the separation they would have experienced relative to the Protestant-dominated social and political context in New Haven." The Order effused a sense that as Catholic gentlemen and Knights of Columbus they should be regarded as exemplars of virtue, not aberrations from the dominant Protestant model of manhood.

=== High standards for members ===
Membership was limited to "practical" Catholic men or "Catholics in good standing" at the time of their application. Only "worthy" men were permitted to join. As Catholics in parishes that were predominately Irish and Irish-American, the demands placed on them by the church would be well known to them.

Perhaps to counteract the perception of the Irish as drunks or lower class, sobriety was demanded of members. The Order was the only fraternal organization in America at the time whose constitution did not exclude African American members, but "liquor dealers" were expressly prohibited from joining. Newspapers at the time published "sensationalized accounts of inebriated soirees" held by other organizations for Irishmen, but the "Knights' social functions—formal dinners, balls, and cotillions—also reflected members' aspirations toward middle-class refinement."

At the Board of Government convention in 1887, a proposal was made to admit non-Catholics, but was strongly opposed by Supreme Knight John J. Phelan: "The Order cannot stultify itself or allow itself to masquerade in the garb of sanctity it wittingly desecrates. Our laws design us to be Catholics pure and simple."

=== Growth ===
Although its first councils were all in Connecticut, the Order spread throughout New England and the United States in subsequent years. The Order experienced "unparalleled success" in the late nineteenth and early twentieth centuries. It outpaced all other Catholic fraternities of the era. By 1904, only five states had no council.

By the time of the first annual convention in 1884, the Order was prospering. The five councils throughout Connecticut had a total of 459 members. Groups from other states were requesting information. By 1889, there were 300 councils comprising 40,000 knights. Twenty years later, in 1909, there were 230,000 knights in 1,300 councils. The one millionth member, Ferdinand Foch, joined the order in 1921.

As the order expanded outside of Connecticut, structural changes in the late 1880s and 1890s were instituted to give the Knights a federalist system with local, state, and national branches of government. This allowed them to coordinate activities across states and localities.

The Charter of 1899 included four statements of purpose, including: "To promote such social and intellectual intercourse among its members as shall be desirable and proper, and by such lawful means as to them shall seem best." The new charter showed members' desire to expand the organization beyond a simple mutual benefit insurance society. Associate members who did not purchase life insurance were permitted to join in 1892.

On September 22, 1934, William Cardinal O'Connell was the first American to be made an honorary member of the Supreme Council. In 1937, Massachusetts State Deputy Patrick J. Moynihan stunned delegates by nominating Deputy Supreme Knight Francis P. Matthews for Supreme Knight, but Matthews declined the nomination.

==== Outside the United States ====
The Knights of Columbus have councils in many countries, including Canada, the Philippines, Mexico, Poland, the Dominican Republic, Puerto Rico, Panama, the Bahamas, the Virgin Islands, Cuba, Guatemala, Guam, Saipan, Lithuania, Ukraine, and South Korea. The first councils in Mexico and the Philippines were founded in 1905. Cuba's first council was established in 1909.

==== Canada ====
Canada Council number 284 was established in 1897 in Montreal. It was largely anglophone with only six French Canadian members. Its first Grand Knight, however, was J.J. Guerin, a member of the Quebec Legislature. Archbishop Paul Bruchesi of Montreal and several other bishops initially opposed the Knights' expansion into Canada. Private negotiations with Cardinal James Gibbons assuaged the fears of most.

In Toronto, however, Archbishop Denis T. O'Connor blocked efforts to expand into his archdiocese on the grounds that there were already too many Catholic societies in existence. Upon his retirement in 1908, new archbishop Fergus McEvay allowed a council to be formed on the condition that he be allowed to appoint the council's chaplain. The 131 charter members swelled to more than 600 in just eight years, and it became the largest council in Ontario with nearly 10% of all knights in the province.

The Knights grew rapidly in Canada, and by 1904 there was a state council in Quebec and one for Ontario and the Maritimes. Six years later, in 1910, the 60 Canadian councils had 9,000 members. While there were other Catholic fraternal societies in Canada in the 19th century, "none recruited as vigorously, grew as rapidly, or captured the public attention and imagination as did the caped and plumed Knights of Columbus." By then, the Knights were seen as "those laymen who could successfully defend the Church from external opposition when required and, more importantly, could voice the opinions and teachings of the Church, bringing them to bear of the problems of Canadian society."

Forty years after its founding, the Knights of Columbus had spread into Canada and had become a powerful enough presence there to generate a backlash from the nationalist francophone community. French Canadians created a competing society, the Ordre de Jacques Cartier, in 1926.

=== Columbian manhood ===
In contrast to most of the other fraternal societies of the era, which provided an escape from the extreme gender bifurcation of the Victorian era, "literature produced by the Knights of Columbus valorized affectionate bonds between men and their mothers, and idealized the relationship between men and their wives and children." The early records of the Order did not display concern about the purported feminization of men that arises from a commitment to family and faith.

Instead, Columbian manhood in the early documents equated manhood with the performance of one's duties as a Catholic and father. It emphasized being chivalrous, a loving husband, a good Catholic, and a solidarity with one's fellow man. Knights were seen as fathers and parishioners first. This sense of duty to faith and family was also reflected in the public events the Order conducted during its first two decades of existence.

The Columbiad, "a monthly paper devoted to the interests of the Knights of Columbus", published an article in November 1903 comparing Knights of Columbus to chivalrous medieval Christian knights, extolling their shared traits of vigorous, virtuous, manly faith. "The Christian Knight," according to The Columbiad, "was the knight of spotless life, of Christian faith, of dauntless courage, of unblemished honor, faithful to his word, loyal and true, like the knights of King Arthur." Both had "manly virtue, valor, humanity, courtesy, justice and honor" and both were called to "rescue the helpless from captivity, to protect the orphans and widows, and assist the sick and poor." Knighthood, in the Columbian model, "valorized individual self-sacrifice for greater social welfare". It gave members "an aristocracy of character".

Columbian men were also expected to take an active role in fatherhood and child rearing. The Columbiad affirmed the role and duty of the father, encouraging men to show affection and to "assist their children intelligently and sympathetically to overcome" faults and character flaws. Men were also expected to have close and supportive relationships with their wives and mothers.

== Fourth Degree ==
From the earliest days of the Order, members wanted to create a form of hierarchy and recognition for senior members; this issue was discussed at the National Meeting of 1899. As early as 1886, Supreme Knight James T. Mullen had proposed a patriotic degree with its own symbolic dress. From these discussions, the Fourth Degree was created, joining the three previous degrees on charity, unity, and fraternity.

About 1,400 members attended the first exemplification of the Fourth Degree at the Lenox Lyceum in New York on February 22, 1900. The event was infused with Catholic and patriotic symbols, imagery that "celebrated American Catholic heritage". The two knights leading the ceremony, for example, were the Expositor of the Constitution and the Defender of the Faith. The ritual soon spread to other cities. The new Fourth Degree members returned to their councils, forming assemblies composed of members from several councils. Those assemblies chose the new members.

In 1903, the Board of Directors officially approved a new degree exemplifying patriotism Order-wide, using the New York City model. The Order had a "desire to receive within its ranks only the best" and intended the men should be practicing Catholics. As one measure, each candidate was required to submit a certificate from his parish priest attesting that he had received Holy Communion within the past two weeks.

Fourth degree members belong to one of 3,109 assemblies, including 75 created in 2012. The first assembly in Europe was established in 2012, and in 2013 a new assembly for Boston-area college councils was created at Harvard University. As of 2013 there were 335,132 Fourth Degree members, including 15,709 who joined the ranks of the Patriotic Degree the year before.

In its early days, it worked to counter the bias that good Catholics could not be good Americans. The early Fourth Degree ceremony stressed the contributions Catholics from many countries had made to the United States and had Catholic citizenship as its theme.

=== Color guards ===
Assemblies may form color guards, which are often the most visible arm of the Knights. They often attend important civic and church events.

The first Fourth Degree uniform, adopted in 1900, consisted of white ties, top hats and tails. In 1940, the uniform was changed to a plumed chapeau, a tuxedo, a cape and a ceremonial sword. With the 1940 uniform, the Supreme Master wore a dark blue cape and chapeau, a vice supreme master wore a light blue cape and chapeau, a master wore a gold cape and chapeau, a district marshal wore a green cape and chapeau, a faithful navigator wore a white cape and chapeau, an assembly commander wore a purple cape and chapeau, and color corps members wore red capes and white chapeaus.

In 2017, the uniform was modernized to consist of a blue blazer, an official Knights of Columbus tie, and a beret, all of which are embossed with the fourth-degree emblem. Members also wear a white shirt and dark gray slacks. The ceremonial sword was retained.

== War efforts ==
=== Cristero War ===
Following the Mexican Revolution, the new government began persecuting the church. To destroy the church's influence over the Mexican people, anti-clerical statutes were inserted into the Constitution, beginning a ten-year persecution of Catholics that resulted in the deaths of thousands, including several priests who were also knights of Columbus. Leaders of the order began speaking out against the Mexican government. Columbia, the official magazine of the Knights, published articles critical of the regime. After the November 1926 cover of Columbia portrayed Knights carrying a banner of liberty and warning of "The Red Peril of Mexico", the Mexican legislature banned both the order and the magazine throughout the country.

In 1926, a delegation of Supreme Council officers met with President Calvin Coolidge to share with him their concerns about the persecution of Catholics in Mexico. The order subsequently launched a $1 million campaign to educate Americans about the attacks on Catholics and the church in the Cristero War. The organization produced pamphlets in English and Spanish denouncing the anticlerical Mexican government and its policies. So much printed material was smuggled into Mexico that the government directed border guards be aware of women bringing Catholic propaganda into the country hidden in their clothes. Twenty-five martyrs from the conflict would eventually be canonized, including six knights.

Supreme Treasurer Daniel J. Callahan, a well known civic leader in Washington, convinced Senator William E. Borah to launch an investigation in 1935 into human rights violations in Mexico. The order was praised for their efforts by Pope Pius XI in his encyclical, Iniquis afflictisque.

=== World War I ===
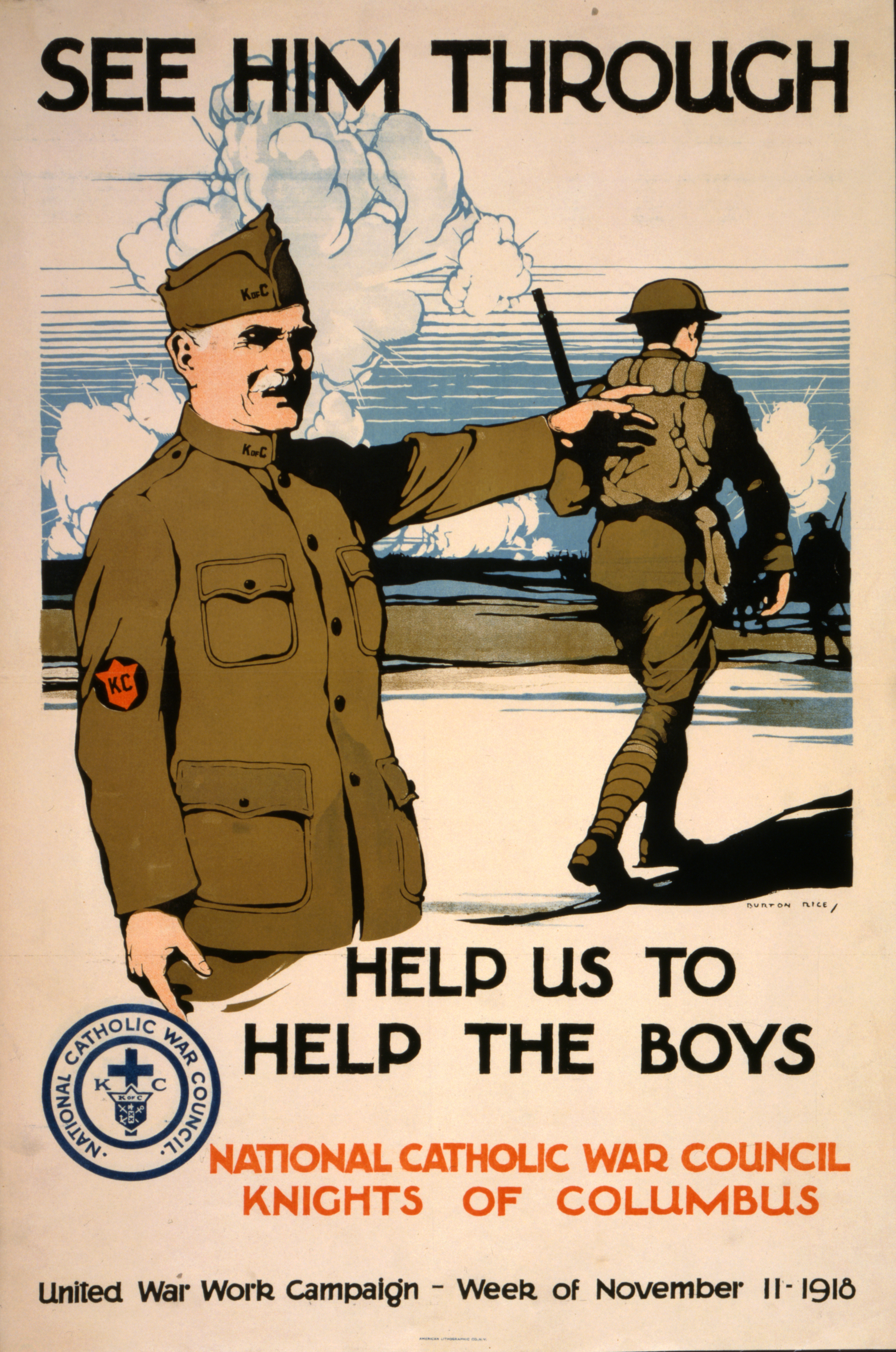

To prove that good Catholics could also be good Americans, and to mitigate some of the American Anti-Catholicism prevalent in the United States at the time, the Knights supported both the war effort and the troops during World War I. Thousands of knights served in the American Expeditionary Forces, including William T. Fitzsimons, considered the first American officer killed in the war. On April 14, 1917, soon after the United States entered the war, the board of directors passed a resolution calling for

the active cooperation and patriotic zeal of 400,000 members of the order in this country to our Republic and its law, pledge their continued and unconditional support to the President and Congress of the Nation, in their determination to protect its honor and its ideals of humanity and right.

Supreme Knight James A. Flaherty proposed to U.S. President Woodrow Wilson that the Order establish soldiers' welfare centers in the U.S. and abroad. The organization already had experience, having provided similar services to troops encamped on the Mexican border during Pershing's expedition of 1916. Staff and chaplains were sent to every Army camp and cantonment.

With the slogan "Everyone Welcome, Everything Free", the "huts" became recreation/service centers for doughboys regardless of race or religion. They were staffed by "secretaries", commonly referred to as "Caseys" (for K of C) who were generally men above the age of military service. The centers provided basic amenities not readily available, such as stationery, hot baths, and religious services. One well-known "Casey" was major league baseball player Johnny Evers of "Tinker-to-Evers-to-Chance", who traveled to France as a member of the Knights of Columbus to organize baseball games for the troops. A total of 260 buildings were erected and 1,134 secretaries, of which 1,075 were overseas, staffed them. In Europe, headquarters were established in London and Paris. The order continued this work until November 1919, at which point the effort was taken over by the federal government.

To pay for these huts and their staff, the order instituted a per capita tax on the membership to raise $1 million. Local councils undertook their own fundraising drives which resulted in an additional $14 million to support the effort. In 1918, just before the war ended, the Knights and other organizations undertook another effort to raise funds to support the welfare of the men fighting abroad. The amount apportioned to the order and the National Catholic War Council totaled $30 million which, when combined with earlier efforts, funded efforts to support troops both in the United States and overseas. After the war, the Knights became involved in education, occupational training, and employment programs for the returning troops.

As a result of their efforts during the war, "the Order was infused with the self-confidence that it could respond with organizational skill and with social and political power to any need of Church and society. In this sense, the K. of C. reflected the passage of American Catholicism from an immigrant Church to a well-established and respected religious denomination which had proven its patriotic loyalty in the acid test of the Great War." The Knights used the legitimacy their war efforts and government partnership provided them to attract millions of new members.

In Canada, the order's charity work a "fusion of Catholicism and Canadian identity among Catholic laymen but [which also] signaled significant changes in Protestant Toronto's acceptance of English-speaking Catholics as loyal citizens." According to Supreme Knight Flaherty, "The war provided us with an opportunity to put ourselves before the public in a most favorable light." Since this time they have been "a leading American association". In fact, the Knights' efforts attracted so much positive publicity that anti-Catholics and opponents of the order began to complain.

After the war, the Knights built a series of playgrounds in Rome for the children of that city, overseen by past Supreme Knight Edward L. Hearn. The work was eventually put to a halt by Benito Mussolini as he wanted the allegiance of the Italian youth for the fascist party.

=== World War II ===
Shortly after the United States entered World War II, the order established a War Activities Committee to keep track of all activities undertaken during the war. They also, in January 1943, established a Peace Program Committee to develop a "program for shaping and educating public opinion to the end that Catholic principles and Catholic philosophy will be properly represented at the peace table at the conclusion of the present war." The committee conferred with scholars, theologians, philosophers, and sociologists and proposed a program adopted at the 1943 Supreme Convention.

==== Canadian Knights ====
Less than two weeks after the outbreak of World War II, on September 13, 1939, Canadian Supreme Director Claude Brown wired each Canadian state deputy to inform them of his plans to establish a welfare program comparable to the "huts" sponsored by the order during World War I. The Canadian government accepted his proposal by the end of October, and formed a unified organization including the Knights, the YMCA, the Salvation Army, and the Canadian Legion. Between December 1939 and April 1940, the Canadian Knights raised almost $230,000, "an extraordinary amount considering the fact that there were relatively few Knights in Canada."

In large cities, recreation centers were established, and morale programs were run in a number of training camps. Hostels were established for servicemen on furloughs first in Canada, then England, and eventually across Europe. Sporting events were organized, musical and comedy shows were produced, and even academic courses and a library were provided.

Recognizing the danger the volunteers who staffed these camps were undertaking, the Canadian government gave them a stipend equal to that of a captain in the Canadian Army and made them eligible for retirement and disability pay. F. O'Neil, who ran the Knights' recreation center in Hong Kong, was captured by the Japanese and was made a prisoner of war. Six volunteers, including Brown, died during the war.

Canadian Knights, and not the government, provided supplies for Catholic chaplains. Bishop Charles Leo Nelligan of the Military Ordinariate of Canada wrote that

In Canada the Knights of Columbus Canadian Army Huts stretch like a golden chain from coast to coast, connecting up all out military camps and a large number of our newly established training centers. In each and every one of them is to be found a genial and capable staff, always ready and anxious to serve the troops.

Supreme Knight Francis Matthews "expressed a feeling of pride" on behalf of the entire order at the Canadian Knights' efforts, and membership in Canada more than doubled between 1939 and 1947.

== Conflict with the Ku Klux Klan ==
Since its earliest days, the Knights of Columbus has been a "Catholic anti-defamation society". These efforts increased during the 1920s as the Knights, the "pre-eminent Catholic fraternal organization", sought to correct misconceptions about Catholicism.

Not long after the establishment of the Fourth Degree, during the nadir of American race relations, a bogus oath was circulated claiming that Fourth Degree Knights swore to exterminate Freemasons and Protestants. In addition, they purportedly were prepared to flay, burn alive, boil, kill, and otherwise torture anyone, including women and children, when called upon to do so by church authorities. "It is a strange paradox," according to some commentators, that the degree devoted to patriotism should be accused of anti-Americanism.

The "bogus oath" was based on a previous oath falsely attributed to the Jesuits more than three centuries earlier. The Ku Klux Klan, which was growing into a newly powerful force through the 1920s, spread the bogus oath far and wide as part of their contemporary campaign against Catholics (which was part of a campaign against immigrants from southern and eastern Europe, of whom many were Catholic). During the 1928 Presidential election, the Klan printed and distributed a million copies of the oath in an effort to defeat Catholic Democratic candidate Al Smith. Thomas S. Butler (R), U.S. Representative from Pennsylvania, read it into the Congressional Record. The bogus oath was refuted by the Committee of Public Information, a propaganda agency of the U.S. Government established during World War I.

Misunderstanding Catholicism, the Klan alleged that Knights were only loyal to the Pope and that they advocated the overthrow of the United States government. Across the country, local, state, and the Supreme Councils offered rewards to anyone who could prove that the widely circulated oath was authentic. No one could, but that did not stop the Klan from continuing to publish and distribute copies. Numerous state councils and the Supreme Council believed that this "violent wave of religious prejudice was actuated by mercenary motives". They believed publication would stop if the KKK were assessed fines or punished by jail time assessed. They began suing distributors for libel. The KKK ended its publication of the false oath. As the Order did not wish to appear motivated by a "vengeful spirit", it asked for leniency from judges when sentencing offenders.

To help combat this misconception, the K of C submitted the actual oath of Fourth Degree members for examination by various groups of prominent non-Catholic men around the country. Many made public declarations attesting to the loyalty and patriotism of the Knights. After examining the true oath, a committee of high-ranking California Freemasons, a group identified as a target in the bogus oath, declared in 1914:

The ceremonial of the Order [of the Knights of Columbus] teaches a high and noble patriotism, instills a love of country, inculcates a reverence of civic duty and holds up the Constitution of our Country as the richest and most precious possession of a Knight of the Order.

In Muncie, Indiana, a local council organized a march of 750 people to protest the KKK.

== Pierce v. Society of Sisters ==
After World War I, many native-born Americans had a revival of concerns about assimilation of immigrants and worries about "foreign" values; they wanted public schools to teach children to be American. Numerous states drafted laws designed to use schools to promote a common American culture, and in 1922, the voters of Oregon passed the Oregon Compulsory Education Act. The law was primarily aimed at eliminating parochial schools, including Catholic schools. It was promoted by groups such as the Knights of Pythias, the Federation of Patriotic Societies, the Oregon Good Government League, the Orange Order, and the Ku Klux Klan.

The Compulsory Education Act required almost all children in Oregon between eight and sixteen years of age to attend public school by 1926. Roger Nash Baldwin, an associate director of the ACLU and a personal friend of then-Supreme Advocate and future Supreme Knight Luke E. Hart, offered to join forces with the Order to challenge the law. The Knights of Columbus pledged an immediate $10,000 to fight the law and any additional funds necessary to defeat it.

The case became known as Pierce v. Society of Sisters, a seminal United States Supreme Court decision that significantly expanded coverage of the Due Process Clause in the Fourteenth Amendment. In a unanimous decision, the Court held that the act was unconstitutional and that parents, not the state, had the authority to educate children as they thought best. It upheld the religious freedom of parents to educate their children in religious schools.

== Racial integration in the U.S. ==
To combat the animus targeted at racial and religious minorities, including Catholics, the Order formed a historical commission which published a series of books in the 1920s on their contributions, among other activities. The "Knights of Columbus Racial Contributions Series" of books included three titles: The Gift of Black Folk: The Negroes in the Making of America, by W. E. B. Du Bois, The Jews in the Making of America by George Cohen, and The Germans in the Making of America by Frederick Schrader.

The Knights of Columbus "was the only American fraternal society which did not, by its constitution, prohibit Negro [sic] membership", according to historian Christopher Kauffman. During World War I, the Knights were designated as the official agency for supporting Catholic troops, and its support facilities were the only racially integrated facilities open to troops. Emmett Jay Scott wrote, "Unlike the other social welfare organizations operating in the war, it never drew the color line."

As the Knights grew and expanded, some councils in the United States were integrated, and others were not. An example of an integrated council was Sheridan Council 119 in Southborough, Massachusetts. Samuel F. Williams, a Black man, was a member and among other activities, spoke on the stage of the 1896 Knights of Columbus Massachusetts State Convention to an audience that included two future Supreme Knights. The path to individual membership in a local Knights council did not explicitly exclude African Americans. Each local council voted in new members, and as few as four or five negative votes against a prospective candidate (no matter the size of the council) was enough to deny someone entry. Joseph Bertrand, who graduated from the University of Notre Dame in 1954, was blackballed from joining a Chicago-area Knights council in 1963 after being nominated by Gene Liner. Liner said that as the vote was announced, "I just watched his face. There were five black balls." Liner then resigned his office in the Knights chapter along with five other council leaders.

Meanwhile, Church officials and organizations increasingly encouraged integration. By the end of the 1950s, KoC Supreme Knight Luke E. Hart was actively encouraging councils to accept Black candidates. In 1963, Hart attended a special meeting at the White House hosted by President John F. Kennedy to discuss civil rights with other religious leaders. After the rejection of Joseph Bertrand's membership application in Chicago, Hart declared that the process for membership would be revised at the next Supreme Convention, but died before he could see it take place.

The 1964 Supreme Convention was scheduled to be held at the Roosevelt Hotel in New Orleans. A few days before the Convention, new Supreme Knight John W. McDevitt learned the hotel admitted only white guests, under the state's racial segregation policy. He threatened to move the Convention to another venue. The hotel changed its policy and so did the Order. The Convention amended the admissions rule to require that a new applicant could not be rejected by less than one-third of those voting. In 1972 the Supreme Convention amended its rules again, requiring a majority of members voting to reject a candidate.

The Knights of Columbus provided $25,000 in lodging scholarships for clergy to attend Martin Luther King Jr.'s I Have a Dream speech in 1963.

== Recent history ==
=== Heads of state ===
In 1959, Fidel Castro sent an aide to represent him at a Fourth Degree banquet in honor of the Golden Jubilee of the Order's entry into Cuba. Supreme Knight Luke E. Hart attended a banquet in the Cuban Prime Minister's honor in April of that year sponsored by the Overseas Press Club. He later sent him a letter expressing regret that they were not able to meet in person.

Hart visited President and fellow Knight John F. Kennedy at the White House on Columbus Day, 1961. (Note: Kennedy, the only Catholic to be elected President of the United States, was a Fourth Degree member of Bunker Hill Council No. 62 and Bishop Cheverus General Assembly. At the meeting, the president told Hart that his younger brother, Ted Kennedy, had received "his Third Degree in our Order three weeks before".) Hart presented Kennedy with a poster of the American flag with the story of how the Order got the words "under God" inserted in the Pledge of Allegiance.

=== New building ===
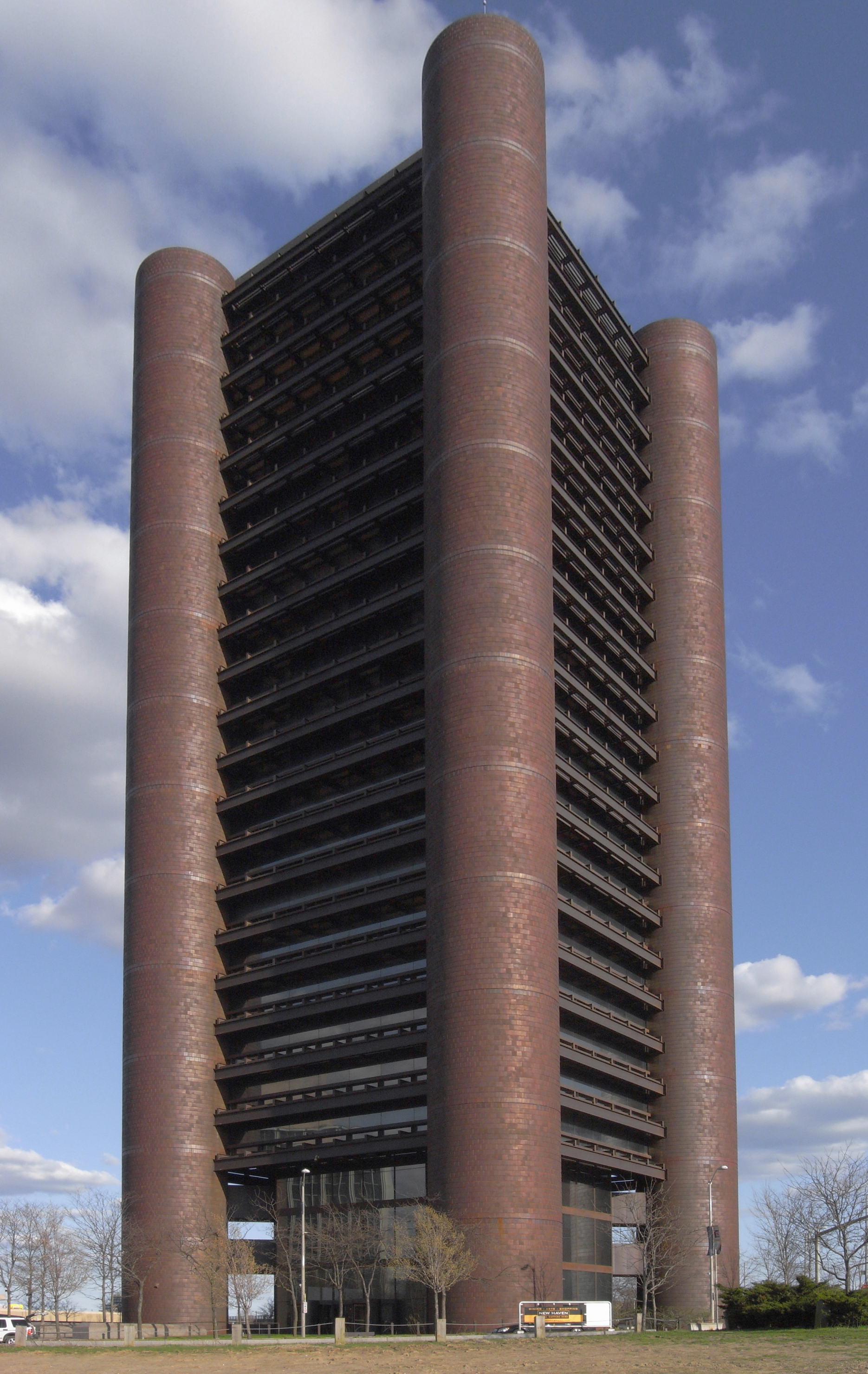
Knights of Columbus headquarters

The Order opened a new headquarters in New Haven in 1969. The 321', 23 story building took two years to construct, including 40 days to pour the concrete for the elevator well. Construction cost less than $10 million. At the time it was the tallest building in the city, but as of 2018 it was the third tallest.

The ribbon cutting took place during the 87th Supreme Convention where Governor John N. Dempsey and Hartford Archbishop John F. Whealon each spoke and Apostolic Delegate Luigi Raimondi gave a blessing. The architect for the building, which broke ground in 1967, was Kevin Roche. Inside the building is a chapel that includes mosaics by Marko Rupnik, a priest accused of sexual assault. The Order covered up the mosaics in a sign of solidarity with victims of abuse, and is considering permanently removing them depending on the outcome of a Vatican investigation.

The order's headquarters had been housed, at various times, in five other buildings. The first was in the law offices of Driscol and Asher next to city hall across from New Haven Green.

=== Popes ===
As the Order and its charitable works grew, so did its prominence within the Church. The Supreme Board of Directors was invited to hold their April meeting at the Vatican in 1978, and the Board and their wives were received by Pope Paul VI. Pope John Paul I's first audience with a layman was with Supreme Knight Dechant, and Pope John Paul II met with Dechant three days after his installation.

Pope John Paul II traveled to the Dominican Republic and Mexico in 1978, and Dechant was invited to attend and welcome the Pope to the Americas. It was also while there that Dechant was invited to establish the Order in the Dominican Republic. During the pope's 1979 visit to the United States, the Supreme Officers and Board were the only lay organization to receive an audience.

In 1997, the cause for McGivney's canonization was opened in the Archdiocese of Hartford. It was placed before the Congregation for the Causes of Saints in 2000. The Father Michael J. McGivney Guild was formed in 1997 to promote his cause, and it currently has more than 140,000 members. Membership in the Knights of Columbus does not automatically make one a member of the guild, nor is membership restricted to Knights; members must elect to join. On March 15, 2008, Pope Benedict XVI approved a decree recognizing McGivney's "heroic virtue", significantly advancing the priest's process toward sainthood. McGivney may now be referred to as the "Venerable Servant of God". If the cause is successful, he would be the first priest born in the United States to be canonized as a saint.

The Knights of Columbus were among the groups that welcomed Pope Benedict XVI on the South Lawn of the White House on April 16, 2008, the pontiff's 81st birthday, during his visit to the U.S. In March 2016 the Knights of Columbus delivered to Secretary of State John Kerry a 280-page report entitled Genocide Against Christians in the Middle East, which led to the State Department's declaration that "ISIS's systematic massacre of Christians in the Middle East had reached genocidal proportions."

=== Military and college councils ===
In each autumn since 1966, the Supreme Council has hosted a College Council Conference at their headquarters in New Haven, Connecticut. The first convention was held at Boston College. As of 2018, there are more than 300 college councils.

A new Military Overseas Europe Special District for the Fourth Degree was established in 2013. More than a hundred Department of Defense civilian employees and active duty personnel based in Germany, Italy, and Britain took part in a special Fourth Degree Exemplification Ceremony at Ramstein Air Force Base in Germany in 2013. In that year exemplifications were also held in Camp Zama, Japan, and Yongsan Garrison in Seoul, Korea, where there are existing assemblies.

=== Supreme Conventions ===
President Richard Nixon addressed the Supreme Convention in 1971. President Ronald Reagan spoke in 1982 and 1986 and George W. Bush spoke in 2004. George H. W. Bush spoke as vice president in 1984 and then again as president in 1992. President Bill Clinton sent a videotaped message to the 111th Supreme Convention saying the Order's "contributions to the Catholic Church and to your communities merit our applause".

=== Other ===
In August 1955, 300 office workers at the Knights' headquarters went on strike for four days. The unionized employees, mostly women, won a pay increase of 3% or $2 a week, whichever was greater, as well as improved sick and vacation time. A five-member panel was also established to review pay scales. Henry O'Brien, the local archbishop, sided with the workers during the walkout and described it as a "serious embarrassment" for the church." On November 1, 1959 the members of the Office Employees International Union struck again, this time for 92 days. The 350 workers bargained for a $3.75 a week immediate salary increase and an additional raise of $2.75 per week beginning on October 31, 1960. The complete package was $1.50 more than what the Order had been offering during most of the strike.

In 2017, an IT contractor sued the Knights of Columbus and accused them of breaching a verbal contract. On September 12, 2019, a jury found the Knights had indeed breached its verbal contract with List Interactive and awarded $500,000 in damages. A report on this situation in The Tablet cited Pope Francis' teaching on "a poor Church for the poor", and contrasted this teaching to the high salaries given to members of the Knights' Board of Directors, the use of a Washington lobbyist employing the son of the Supreme Knight, and vigorous encouragement of insurance policy sales by the Knights' chief insurance officer.

== Insurance program ==
Year	Reserve Fund Assets
1896	$12,000

The original insurance system devised by McGivney gave a deceased Knight's widow a $1,000 death benefit. Each member was assessed $1 upon a death, and when the number of Knights grew beyond 1,000, the assessment decreased according to the rate of increase. Each member, regardless of age, was assessed equally. As a result, younger, healthier members could expect to pay more over the course of their lifetimes than those men who joined when they were older. There was also a Sick Benefit Deposit for members who fell ill and could not work. Each sick Knight was entitled to draw up to $5 a week for 13 weeks (roughly equivalent to $125.75 in 2009 dollars). If he remained sick after that, the council to which he belonged determined the sum of money given to him.

The need for a reserve fund for times of epidemic was seen from the earliest days, but it was rejected several times before finally being established in 1892.

Since its first loan to St. Rose Church in Meriden, Connecticut in the late 1890s, the Knights of Columbus have made loans to parishes, dioceses, and other Catholic institutions. By 1954, over $300 million had been loaned and the program "never lost one cent of principal or interest".

In the post-World War II era, the interest rates on long-term bonds dipped below levels at which the Order's insurance program could sustain itself, and Supreme Knight Hart moved the order into a more aggressive program of investing in real estate. Under his leadership, the Order established a lease-back investment program in which the Order would buy a piece of property and then lease it back to the original owner "upon terms generally that would bring to our Order a net rental equal to the normal mortgage interest rate".

Late in 1953 it was learned that the land upon which Yankee Stadium was built was for sale. On December 17, 1953, the Order purchased the property for $2.5 million and then leased it back for 28 years at $182,000 a year with the option to renew the lease for three additional terms of 15 years at $125,000 a year. In 1971 the City of New York took the land by eminent domain.

Between 1952 and 1962, 18 pieces of land were purchased as part of the lease-back program for a total of $29 million. During this time, the amount of money invested in common stock also increased. In 1969, a requirement that all members between 18 and 26 take out insurance was abolished.

=== Modern program ===
Year	Insurance in force (billions)	Assets (billions)
2024	$123	
2023	$121	
2021	$114	$26
2020	$110+	$20+
2019	$109+	$26+
2018	$109	$26
2015	$99	
2014	$100	$24
2013	$90	$19.8
2012	$88.4	$19.4
2011	$83.5	$18.0
2010	$79.0	$16.9
2009	$74.3	$15.5
2008	$70.0	$14
2007	$66.0	$13
2006	$61.9	$12.2
2005	$57.7	
2004	$53.3	
2003	$49.1	
2002	$45.6	
2001	$42.9	
2000	$40.4	
1999	$38	
1997	$30	
1992	$20	
1990	$14	$3.6
1981	$6.4	$1
1976	$3.6	$656 million
1975	$3	
1971	$2	
1964	$1+	
1960	$1	

The order offers a modern, professional insurance operation with more than $123 billion of life insurance policies in force and $29 billion in assets as of October 2025.

Over $286 million in death benefits were paid in 2012 and $1.7 billion were paid between 2000 and 2010. This is large enough to rank 49th on the A. M. Best list of all life insurance companies in North America. Since the founding of the Order, $3.5 billion in death benefits have been paid. Premiums in 2012 were nearly $1.2 billion, and dividends paid out totaled more than $274 million. Over the same time period, annuity deposits rose 4.2%, compared to an 8% loss for the industry as a whole.

Every day in 2012 more than $10 million was invested, for a total of $2.7 billion on the year, and an annual income of $905 million. The Order maintains a two prong investment strategy. A company must first be a sound investment before stock in it is purchased, and secondly the company's activities must not conflict with Catholic social teaching. Citing the awards they have won, the Order calls themselves "champions of ethical investing".

The order also provides mortgages to dioceses, parishes, schools, hospitals, seminaries, and religious orders at "very competitive rates" through its ChurchLoan program. (Note: The first loan was to St. Rose Church in Meriden, Connecticut in 1896.) The profits are used to pay life insurance claims. An average of $20 million in loans are made each year, with an average loan totally $1.8 million. By 1954, over $300 million had been loaned and the program "never lost one cent of principal or interest". Over $500 million had been loaned by 2008.

Products include permanent and term life insurance, as well as annuities, long term care insurance, and disability insurance. The insurance program is not a separate business offered by the Order to others but is exclusively for the benefit of members and their families. According to the Fortune 1000 list, the Knights of Columbus ranked 880 in total revenue in 2017 and, with more than 1,500 agents, was 925th in size in 2015. All agents are members of the Order.

The Order's insurance program is the most highly rated program in North America. For 40 consecutive years, the Order has received A. M. Best's highest rating, A++. Additionally, the Order is certified by the Insurance Marketplace Standards Association for ethical sales practices. Standard & Poor's downgraded the insurance program's financial strength/credit rating from AAA to AA+ in August 2011 not due to the Order's financial strength, but due to its lowering of the long-term sovereign credit rating of the United States to AA+. (Note: Other US insurance groups also downgraded by S&P from AAA to AA+ were New York Life, Northwestern Mutual, TIAA, and USAA as, like the Knights of Columbus, their assets are highly concentrated in the U.S. and they have significant holdings in U.S. Treasury and agency securities.) Additionally, the insurance program has a low 3.5% lapse rate of the 1.9 million members and their families who are insured. Forbes publishes an annual list of what it refers to as "America's Best Insurance Companies", and it has included the Knights of Columbus insurance program on this list since 2022.

== Awards ==
The order sponsors a number of international awards. The first, the Gaudium et Spes Award, is named after the document from the Second Vatican Council, and is the highest honor bestowed by the order. It "is awarded only in special circumstances and only to individuals of exceptional merit" and comes with an honorarium of $100,000. Since its institution in 1992, it has been awarded only twelve times.

The second highest international award, also given only "when merited", is the Caritas Award. Named for the theological virtue alternatively translated as either charity or love, it recognizes "extraordinary works of charity and service". The order established the Grand Cross of the Knights of Columbus, but awarded it only to Cristobal Colón y de La Cerda, Duke of Veragua and descendant of Columbus, when he visited the U.S. in 1893.

Gaudium et Spes Award winners:

- Mother Teresa of Calcutta, 1992
- Cardinal John J. O'Connor, 1994
- Cardinal James A. Hickey, 2000
- Cardinal William Baum, 2001
- Latin Patriarch Michel Sabbah, 2002
- Jean Vanier, 2005
- Cardinal Tarcisio Bertone, 2012
- Cardinal Jaime Ortega
- Cardinal Stanisław Dziwisz
- Virgil Dechant
- Cardinal Francis George
- Fr Gerard Hammond, M.M., 2017

== Supreme Conventions ==
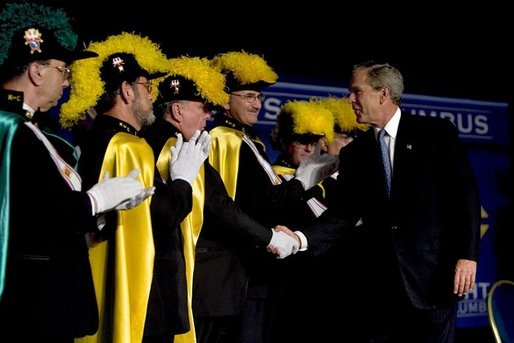
George W. Bush greets Fourth Degree Knights at the 122nd Annual Convention

The Knights of Columbus invites the head of state of every country in which they operate to the annual Supreme Convention. In 1971, President Richard Nixon gave the keynote address at the States Dinner; Secretary of Transportation and Knight John Volpe had arranged this first appearance of a U.S. president at a Supreme Council gathering.

President Ronald Reagan spoke at the Centennial Convention in 1982. Reagan presented the order with a President's Volunteer Action Award at the White House in 1984. President George H. W. Bush appeared in 1992. President Bill Clinton sent a written message while he was in office, and President George W. Bush sent videotaped messages before he attended in person at the 2004 convention. President Barack Obama also sent written messages during his term in office.

== Sources ==
- Alley, Robert S., ed. (1999). The Constitution & Religion: Leading Supreme Court Cases on Church and State. Amherst, New York: Prometheus Books. ISBN 978-1-57392-703-1.
- Bauernschub, John P. (1949). Fifty Years of Columbianism in Maryland. Baltimore, Maryland: Maryland State Council.
- ——— (1965). Columbianism in Maryland, 1897–1965. Baltimore, Maryland: Maryland State Council.
- Brinkley, Douglas; Fenster, Julie M. (2006). Parish Priest: Father Michael McGivney and American Catholicism. New York: William Morrow. ISBN 978-0-06-077684-8.
- Dodge, William Wallace (1903). The Fraternal and Modern Banquet Orator: An Original Book of Useful Helps at the Social Session and Assembly of Fraternal Orders, College Entertainments, Social Gatherings and All Banquet Occasions. Chicago: Monarch Book Company.
- Dumenil, Lynn (Fall 1991). "The tribal Twenties: "Assimilated" Catholics' response to Anti-Catholicism in the 1920s". Journal of American Ethnic History. 11 (1): 21–49. JSTOR 27500903.
- Egan, Maurice Francis; Kennedy, John James Bright (1920). The Knights of Columbus in Peace and War. Vol. 1. BiblioBazaar. ISBN 978-1-142-78398-3.
- Fry, Henry Peck (1922). The Modern Ku Klux Klan. Boston: Small, Maynard & Company.
- Hearn, Edward (1913). "Knights of Columbus" . In Herbermann, Charles G.; Pace, Edward A.; Pallen, Condé B.; Shahan, Thomas J.; Wynne, John J. (eds.). Catholic Encyclopedia. Vol. 8. New York: Encyclopedia Press. pp. 670–671.
- Hubbard, Robert; Hubbard, Kathleen (2019). Hidden History of New Haven. Arcadia Publishing. ISBN 978-1-4671-4082-9.
- Kauffman, Christopher J. (1982). Faith and Fraternalism: The History of the Knights of Columbus, 1882–1982. Harper and Row. ISBN 978-0-06-014940-6.
- ——— (2013). "Knights of Columbus". In Venzon, Anne Cipriano; Miles, Paul L. (eds.). The United States in the First World War: An Encyclopedia. New York: Garland Publishing. pp. 321–322. ISBN 978-1-135-68453-2.
- ——— (2001). Patriotism and Fraternalism in the Knights of Columbus. New York: Crossroad Publishing Company. ISBN 978-0-8245-1885-1.
- Kaufmann, Eric P. (2007). The Orange Order: A Contemporary Northern Irish History. Oxford: Oxford University Press. ISBN 978-0-19-920848-7.
- Koehlinger, Amy (Winter 2004). ""Let Us Live for Those Who Love Us": Faith, Family, and the Contours of Manhood among the Knights of Columbus in Late Nineteenth-Century Connecticut". Journal of Social History. 38 (2): 455–469. doi:10.1353/jsh.2004.0126. JSTOR 3790447. S2CID 144647069.
- Lapomarda, Vincent A. (1992). The Knights of Columbus in Massachusetts (second ed.). Norwood, Massachusetts: Knights of Columbus Massachusetts State Council.
- Marchildon, Gregory P. (2009). "Introduction". In Marchildon, Gregory P. (ed.). Immigration and Settlement, 1870–1939. History of the Prairie West. Vol. 2. Regina, Saskatchewan: University of Regina Press. pp. 1–9. ISBN 978-0-88977-230-4.
- McGowan, Mark G. (1999). Waning of the Green: Catholics, the Irish, and Identity in Toronto, 1887–1922. McGill–Queen's Press—MQUP. ISBN 978-0-7735-1789-9.
- Mecklin, John (2013) [1924]. The Ku Klux Klan: A Study of the American Mind. Read Books. ISBN 978-1-4733-8675-4.
- Salvaterra, David L. (2002). "Review of Patriotism and Fraternalism in the Knights of Columbus: A History of the Fourth Degree by Christopher J. Kauffman". The Catholic Historical Review. 88 (1): 157–158. doi:10.1353/cat.2002.0048. ISSN 1534-0708. JSTOR 25026129. S2CID 162342037.
- Scott, Emmett J. (1919). Scott's Official History of the American Negro in the World War. Chicago: Homewood Press.
- Singular, Stephen (2005). By Their Works: Profiles of Men of Faith Who Made a Difference. New York: HarperCollins. ISBN 978-0-06-116145-2.
- Skocpol, Theda; Ganz, Marshall; Munson, Ziad (2000). "A Nation of Organizers: The Institutional Origins of Civic Voluntarism in the United States" (PDF). The American Political Science Review. 94 (3): 527–546. doi:10.2307/2585829. JSTOR 2585829. S2CID 145598414.
- Skocpol, Theda (May 13, 2004). Skocpol, Theda; Fiorina, Morris P. (eds.). Civic Engagement in American Democracy. Brookings Institution Press. ISBN 978-0-8157-9893-4.
- Sullivan, Neil (2001). The Diamond in the Bronx: Yankee Stadium and the Politics of New York. New York: Oxford University Press. ISBN 978-0-19-535253-5.
- Sweany, Mark J. (1923). Educational Work of the Knights of Columbus. Bureau of Education Bulletin. Vol. 22. Washington: Government Printing Office. hdl:2346/60378.
- Trepanier, James Daniel Joseph (2007). Battling a Trojan horse: The Ordre de Jacques Cartier and the Knights of Columbus, 1917–1965 (Thesis). University of Ottawa.
