= James E. Hayes =

3rd Supreme Knight of the Knights of Columbus

3rd Supreme Knight of the Knights of Columbus
- In office March 2, 1897 – February 8, 1898
- Preceded by: John J. Phelan
- Succeeded by: John J. Cone

5th Deputy Supreme Knight of the Knights of Columbus
- In office 1895 – 1897

Personal details
- Born: August 10, 1865 Charlestown, Massachusetts, U.S.
- Died: February 8, 1898 (aged 32) Boston City Hospital, Massachusetts, U.S.
- Education: Boston College (AB)

James E. Hayes (August 10, 1865 – February 8, 1898) was an American politician and the third Supreme Knight of the Knights of Columbus from March 2, 1897, to February 8, 1898.

== Early life ==
Hayes was born August 10, 1865, in Charlestown, Massachusetts, to Peter and Theresa (née Hendrick) Hayes, Irish immigrants. He had four brothers and three sisters. (Note: His siblings were named Thomas, Peter, John, William, Theresa, Katie, and Mrs. William Cunningham.)

Hayes attended Prescott Grammar School and Boston College, graduating with highest honors in 1885. When Boston College's Alumni Association was formed in 1886, he was a founding member of the executive committee. He was a teacher first at the truant school on Deer Island, and then at the Frothingham Grammar School for six years, before passing the bar exam and becoming a lawyer.

== Political career ==
He was a Democratic Representative in the Massachusetts House of Representatives from 1892 to 1896, representing Suffolk County's District 3. He lost an election to the Massachusetts Senate in 1894, but was elected in 1896. During this time he was the chairman of the House Democratic Caucus. After his ticket was declared the winner of an 1897 election for the local Ward Three Democratic Committee, his supporters hoisted him upon their shoulders at 3 a.m. and marched him through the streets, being led by a fife and drum corps. He was a candidate for president of the city committee, but lost.

Hayes also served as president of the Father Matthew Total Abstinence Society and Urban Associates, and was a member of the Young Men's Catholic Association at Boston College, the Catholic Literary Union of Charleston, the Massachusetts Catholic Order of Foresters, and several other organizations.

== Knights of Columbus ==
Hayes joined the Knights in Massachusetts in 1892 as the charter Deputy Grand Knight of the Bunker Hill Council Number 62, the first council in Massachusetts. He also served as the first state deputy of Massachusetts, winning by unanimous vote on April 24, 1893, and then winning reelection in 1895 and 1896.

During his time as a district deputy and state deputy, he presided over the institution of 75 councils. One council, founded at Boston College in 1895, was later renamed in his honor. He was also present at the institutions of the first councils in New Hampshire in 1893 and New York. He announced his desire to step down as state deputy in advance of the 1897 state convention, and was succeeded by Edward L. Hearn.

By the time he was elected Supreme Knight in 1897, Massachusetts had one-third of all the councils in the Order and one half of the members. Hayes defeated John J. Phelan by a vote of 17–13 with one abstention to become Supreme Knight However, having died so shortly after taking office, he presided only over three meetings of the National Board of Directors, and never wielded the gavel at a meeting of the National Council. As of 2019, he is the youngest Supreme Knight ever.

At the centennial of the order, the official historian of the Massachusetts Knights of Columbus, Rev. Vincent A. Lapomarda, S.J., wrote that "the contribution of Mr. James E. Hayes to the start of the Knights of Columbus in Massachusetts can not be exaggerated." At his death, the Board of Directors passed a resolution lamenting his passing and extolling "his boundless zeal, matchless mind, and devoted heart" and sent the balance of his remaining salary for the term to his mother.

== Death ==
Hayes was brought to Boston City Hospital on February 3, 1898, after an accident caused a rupture. His condition was severe and an operation was needed. On February 8, 1898, Hayes died from complications caused from peritonitis. His funeral was held Friday, February 10, 1898, at St. Francis de Sales in Charlestown, and was attended by 1,500 Knights. A large number of clergy, nearly every member of the Senate, delegations from the Massachusetts House of Representatives and Massachusetts Governor's Council, and numerous other political figures attended. Thousands of people stood outside the church, unable to find space inside.

A memorial service was held on March 6, 1898, at St. Margaret's Church in Dorchester, Massachusetts. Numerous other services were held around the city of Boston and around the country in his honor. Hayes, a bachelor, was buried in St. Paul's Cemetery in Arlington, Massachusetts.

His death, one history noted, "deprived the Order of a leader whose career had been so admirable that it gave the promise of remarkable fruition." The Knights established a scholarship in his honor at Boston College. The Boston Globe, in a front-page obituary, eulogized him by saying his death "removes from the ranks of political life one of the foremost young orators and leaders of the Democratic Party in Massachusetts, and one of the most promising members of the Massachusetts legislature."

== See also ==
- 119th Massachusetts General Court (1898)

== Works cited ==
- Kauffman, Christopher J. (1982). Faith and Fraternalism: The History of the Knights of Columbus, 1882–1982. Harper and Row. ISBN 978-0-06-014940-6.
- Lapomarda, Vincent A. (1992). The Knights of Columbus in Massachusetts (second ed.). Norwood, Massachusetts: Knights of Columbus Massachusetts State Council.

Religious titles
Preceded by John J. Phelan	Supreme Knight of the Knights of Columbus; 1897-1898	Succeeded by John J. Cone
