= Order of Foresters =

There are a number of inter-related fraternal orders named Order of the Foresters. It may refer to:

- Independent Order of Foresters
- Catholic Orders of Foresters
- Ancient Order of Foresters
- Foresters Friendly Society
- Irish National Foresters
