= Patrick Moynihan =

Patrick Moynihan may refer to:

- Daniel Patrick Moynihan, known as Pat, American politician and sociologist
- Patrick Moynihan, 2nd Baron Moynihan, British Liberal peer
- Patrick J. Moynihan (1891–1969), Irish–American political and social leader in Massachusetts
- P. H. Moynihan, U.S. representative from Illinois
