= John J. Cone =

4th Supreme Knight of the Knights of Columbus

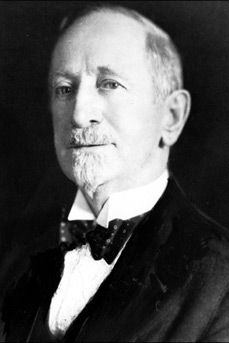

4th Supreme Knight of the Knights of Columbus
- In office March 2, 1898 – March 31, 1899
- Preceded by: James E. Hayes
- Succeeded by: Edward L. Hearn

6th Deputy Supreme Knight of the Knights of Columbus
- In office 1897 – 1898

Personal details
- Born: 1858 New Jersey, U.S.
- Died: January 1937 (aged 78–79) United States

John J. Cone (born 1858 – January 1937) was the fourth Supreme Knight of the Knights of Columbus from 1898 to 1899 and Fire Commissioner of Jersey City, New Jersey.

Cone was a founding member of Jersey City Council #137 of the Knights of Columbus on November 3, 1895. In less than three years he was elected Supreme Knight after Supreme Knight Hayes died suddenly from complications from peritonitis.

== Knights of Columbus ==
During Cone's time in charge, the Knights subscribed to war bonds in order to support the Spanish–American War. He also directed that soldiers and sailors were not to be disqualified from being insurance members. By the end of his time as Supreme Knight the order had reached as far west as the state of Minnesota.

== Death ==
Cone died at his home in January 1937. He was 79 years old.

Religious titles
Preceded by James E. Hayes	Supreme Knight of the Knights of Columbus; 1899-1898	Succeeded by Edward L. Hearn
