= John C. Curtis =

United States Army Medal of Honor recipient

John Calvin Curtis
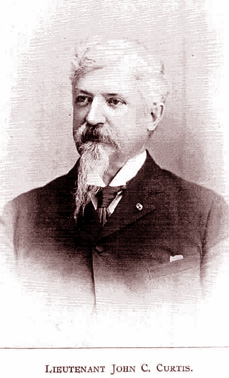
- Born: April 17, 1845; Bridgeport, Connecticut
- Died: January 17, 1917 (aged 71)
- Burial place: Mountain Grove Cemetery, Bridgeport, Connecticut
- Military career
- Allegiance: United States of America; Union
- Branch: United States Army; Union Army
- Service years: 1861-1865
- Rank: First Lieutenant
- Unit: 9th Regiment Connecticut Volunteer Infantry
- Conflicts: American Civil War; *Battle of Baton Rouge (1862)
- Awards: Medal of Honor

John Calvin Curtis (April 17, 1845 – January 17, 1917) was a Lieutenant of the Ninth Regiment Connecticut Volunteer Infantry in the American Civil War, and a Medal of Honor recipient.

Curtis was born on April 17, 1845, in Bridgeport, Connecticut. He enlisted in the Ninth Regiment on August 17, 1861. On August 5, 1862, as a Sergeant-Major at age 17, he became instrumental in repulsing a Confederate attack aimed at recapturing Baton Rouge, Louisiana. During heavy firing, he "voluntarily sought the line of battle and alone and unaided captured 2 prisoners, driving them before him to regimental headquarters at the point of the bayonet." For this act, Curtis received the Medal of Honor on December 16, 1896, the only soldier from the Ninth to be so honored.

Curtis was later promoted to First Lieutenant. He died on January 17, 1917, and was buried at Mountain Grove Cemetery in Bridgeport.

== Medal of Honor citation ==
He voluntarily sought the line of battle and alone and unaided captured 2 prisoners, driving them before him to regimental headquarters at the point of the bayonet.

== See also ==
- List of Medal of Honor recipients
- List of American Civil War Medal of Honor recipients: A–F
