= James T. Mullen =

1st Supreme Knight of the Knights of Columbus

James Terrance Mullen

1st Supreme Knight of the Knights of Columbus
- In office March 29, 1882 – May 17, 1886
- Preceded by: Position established
- Succeeded by: John J. Phelan

Personal details
- Born: August 30, 1843 New Haven, Connecticut, U.S.
- Died: July 6, 1891 (aged 47) New Haven, Connecticut, U.S.
- Spouse: Anne Elizabeth Pigott
- Children: 1

James Terrance Mullen (August 30, 1843 – July 6, 1891) was the first Supreme Knight of the Knights of Columbus from March 29, 1882 to May 17, 1886. He also served in the New Haven, Connecticut police and Fire Departments, and as an alderman. With his service in the Union Army and in several fraternal orders, he has been described as "veteran of fraternity."

== Personal life ==
Mullen was born in New Haven, Connecticut, U.S. on August 30, 1843, and attended the public schools there. He married Anne Elizabeth Pigott, the sister of Congressman James P. Pigott. They had one son. His nephew, William P. Cronan, served as the 19th Naval Governor of Guam.

== Early career ==
=== Knights of Columbus ===
Mullen was one of the original members of the Knights of Columbus. He joined on February 2, 1882. When Father Michael McGivney first conceived of creating the Order, he proposed the name the Sons of Columbus. Mullen instead suggested using Knights instead of Sons to better exemplify the ritualistic nature of the nascent organization.

Mullen credited McGivney's "indomitable will" for the success of the Order. As Supreme Knight, he installed the officers of other councils, including Silver City Council No. 2 on May 16, 1883, in Meriden, Connecticut. On the train ride to Meriden, Mullen assigned Daniel Colwell the responsibility of devising the installation ceremony. As Supreme Knight, Mullen supported the expansion of the Order outside of Connecticut, a contentious issue at the time.

Colwell and Mullen joined McGivney in presenting the ceremonials of the Order to Bishop Lawrence McMahon of the Diocese of Hartford to ensure they were acceptable for a Catholic organization. Enthusiasm for the degree work led to calls to create a fourth degree, and Mullen supported creating a fifth.

With two councils established, Mullen presided over the Supreme Convention on June 15, 1883. At this convention he was appointed to a committee of one to design an emblem for the Order. At a later convention, he was appointed to a committee to draft a resolution honoring Fr. McGivney.

In 1886, Mullen was re-elected Supreme Knight, but declined the appointment on May 17, 1886. He did, however, accept the newly created position of Director General of Ceremonies, a position he held until his death in 1891.

=== Other fraternal activities ===
In 1874, Mullen suggested the creation of a social organization that came to be known as the Red Knights. He served as their Supreme Knight from 1875 to their disbanding in 1880. He was also a Knight of St. Patrick and an amateur actor in local theatrical productions.

== Later career ==
=== Civil War ===
Mullen enlisted in the 9th Connecticut Infantry Regiment on September 11, 1861 and served as a sergeant in the Civil War. He took part in digging Grant's Canal. He became ill, however, and was discharged on December 27, 1862. He later became a leader of the Sarsfield Guards, an Irish Catholic militia organization that later became a part of the Connecticut National Guard.

=== Career and public service ===
Following the Civil War, Mullen became a police lieutenant in New Haven. For 13 years, he was fire commissioner in the New Haven Fire Department and was president of the board for several years. He also served as an Alderman for the City of New Haven.

He became a successful businessman following his apprenticeship painting ornamental signs he became a commercial traveler. He formed a partnership with G.W.M. Reed and assumed full control of the company in 1884. He ran this company until his death.

== Death ==
James Mullen died July 6, 1891. He is buried in New Haven's St. Bernard's Cemetery.

== Bibliography ==
- Kauffman, Christopher J. (1982). Faith and Fraternalism: The History of the Knights of Columbus, 1882–1982. Harper and Row. ISBN 978-0-06-014940-6.
- Koehlinger, Amy (Winter 2004). ""Let Us Live for Those Who Love Us": Faith, Family, and the Contours of Manhood among the Knights of Columbus in Late Nineteenth-Century Connecticut". Journal of Social History. 38 (2): 455–469. doi:10.1353/jsh.2004.0126. JSTOR 3790447. S2CID 144647069.
- O'Neill, Charles S. (1908). "The Story of Columbian Knighthood". Donahoe's Magazine. T.B. Noonan: 53–60.

Religious titles
Preceded by NA	Supreme Knight of the Knights of Columbus; 1882-1886	Succeeded by John J. Phelan
