= 9th Connecticut Infantry Regiment =

9th Connecticut Volunteer Infantry
- Active: September 1861 to August 1865
- Country: United States
- Allegiance: Union
- Branch: United States Army
- Type: Infantry
- Equipment: Springfield rifled muskets
- Engagements: Battle of Baton Rouge; First Battle of Deep Bottom; Battle of Opequon; Battle of Cedar Creek; Battle of Fisher's Hill

The 9th Connecticut Infantry Regiment was a volunteer infantry regiment in the Union Army during the American Civil War. It was established in September 1861 as an Irish regiment, composed mainly of soldiers born in Ireland or first generation Irish Americans. The regiment saw action in number major battles, particularly in the Western Theater.

== Organization and early service ==
The 9th Connecticut Infantry Regiment was formed in September 1861, primarily using recruits whose terms of enlistments in Connecticut's early three-months regiments had expired. Its first field officers were relatively experienced soldiers. Colonel Thomas W. Cahill of New Haven had a number of years experience with the antebellum state militia as captain of the Emmet Guards, while Lieutenant Colonel Richard Fitzgibbons and Major Frederick Frye had both served as captains of three-month companies at the First Battle of Bull Run in July.

Although recruitment at Camp English in New Haven proceeded slowly due to the lack of proper clothing and equipment, the regiment had 845 men when it left New Haven in November by rail for Camp Chase in Lowell, Massachusetts. There, the 9th was part of Brigadier General Benjamin Butler’s "New England Brigade" organized for the capture of New Orleans. The Ninth included James T. Mullen.

== Duty in Mississippi ==
Before the end of the month, they left Boston Harbor as part of more than 3,000 troops on board the steamer Constitution. They arrived at Ship Island, Mississippi, on December 3, where they supplied with arms and some improved clothing. After early action at Biloxi and Pass Christian, the regiment was directed by General Butler to make a public parade through the city to discourage any outbreaks against Federal authorities.

On June 25, 1862, the unit was put to work upriver on a canal opposite Vicksburg along with regiments from Massachusetts, Vermont, Michigan and Wisconsin, all under the direction of General Thomas Williams. The canal was intended to connect a loop in the Mississippi River and allow Union ships to bypass the cannons on the bluffs at Vicksburg and have free access from the north to the Gulf of Mexico. However, lack of drinking water, supplies and medicine, as well as the summer heat and exposure quickly took its toll as heatstroke, malaria, and dysentery spread rapidly. With many dying or incapacitated, slaves from nearby plantations were added to the workforce, but, as the water level fell in the river, the canal attempt was abandoned on July 24 and the troops were moved downriver to Baton Rouge, Louisiana. A boat, the Algerine, with 300 sick on board, was left behind with Surgeon Gallagher of the 9th in charge. In a four-month span from July to October 1862, 150 men from the Ninth Regiment alone died of disease.

== Subsequent service in Louisiana and Virginia ==
At Baton Rouge, Louisiana, Williams was killed under a Confederate charge on August 5. Colonel Cahill took command of all the Union troops and repulsed the attack. The regiment was highly praised after the battle and subsequently assigned to the defenses of New Orleans through the end of 1863.

In the spring of 1864, the regiment arrived home in New Haven on veteran furlough amidst great celebration and parades. The re-enlisted veterans landed at Bermuda Hundred, Virginia, outside Richmond in July and participated in an engagement at Deep Bottom. After a brief trip to the Washington D.C. area, they saw action in the Shenandoah Valley area with battles at Opequon, Cedar Creek, and Fishers Hill. The final veterans were mustered out in August 1865.

A total of 250 men from the regiment died during the war.

John C. Curtis, the regiment's 17-year-old sergeant major, received the Medal of Honor for his actions at Baton Rouge in August 1862.

== See also ==
- List of Connecticut Civil War units
