= Red Knight (disambiguation) =

The Red Knight is the name of several characters in the Arthurian legend.

Red Knight can also refer to:

- An alternative name for the Black knight in chess, where (as is the case in Through the Looking Glass by Lewis Carroll) the white pieces are opposed by red pieces, and not black pieces.
- Red Knights (militant organization), also called the Knights of the Flaming Circle, an anti-Ku Klux Klan organization in the 1920s
- The Red Knights, Manchester United supporters group planning a takeover of the club in 2010
- Red Knight (aircraft), a Canadian aerobatics show
- Red Knight (whisky), a brand of Indian whisky
- Red Knight (Forgotten Realms), a fictional deity in the Dungeons & Dragons campaign setting Forgotten Realms
- A book written by Christian Cameron, the first in the Traitor Son Cycle
- De Rode Ridder, a Belgian comic created by Willy Vandersteen
- Rencontre avec le dragon, a French film of which the English version is titled "The Red Knight"
- The Red Knight, a King Arthur class railway locomotive
- The Red Knight, a BR Standard Class 5 railway locomotive
- The Red Knights (fraternal society), a fraternal organization for Irish Americans in New Haven, Connecticut founded in 1874
- The Red Knight (novel), a 1921 work by British writer Francis Brett Young
- "Red Knight" (Mr Benn), a 1971 television episode
