= Warren-Prescott School =

Coordinates: 42.3780°N 71.0644°W

Location
- 50 School Street; Charlestown, MA; USA

Information
- Type: Public
- Established: 1840
- School district: Boston Public Schools
- Principal: Michele Davis
- Staff: 45
- Faculty: About 65
- Enrollment: 545 (2015-16)
- Campus: Urban
- Website: https://www.warrenprescott.org/

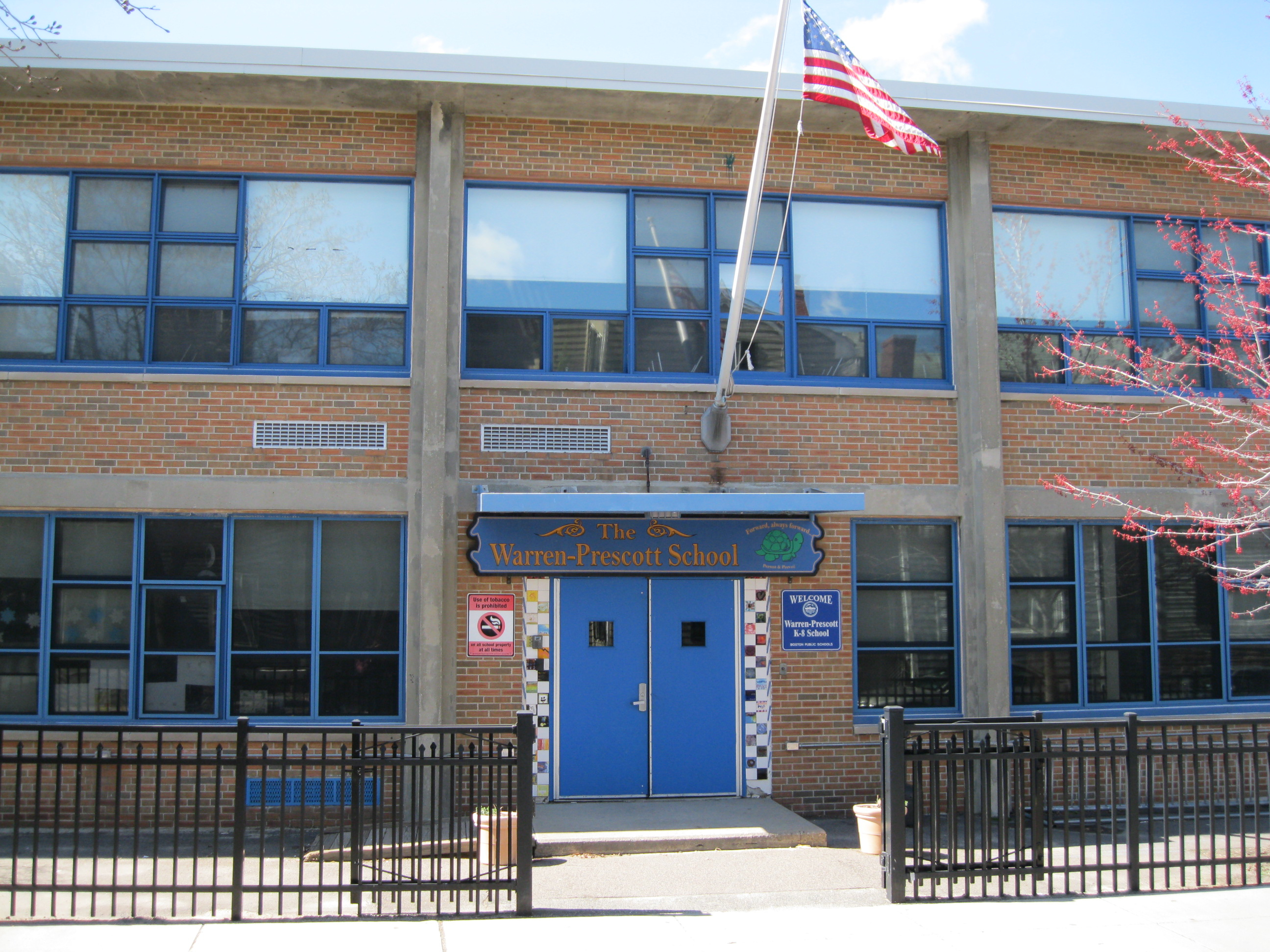
Warren-Prescott K-8 School

Warren-Prescott School is a Boston public school located in Charlestown, Massachusetts with a zip code of 02129. Warren-Prescott School is a K–8 school, but was an elementary school before 2004.

== History ==
This school is named after two historical figures from the American Revolution. Dr. Joseph Warren fought and died at the Battle of Bunker Hill in 1775, a few hundred yards from the school. William Prescott was the commander of the colonial forces at the Battle of Bunker Hill.

On April 21, 1840, the first Warren School was dedicated in Charlestown, Massachusetts near Bunker and Breed's Hills. The current school occupies the former site of the Warren School. On December 15, 1857, the Prescott School was dedicated, located on a portion of the Bunker Hill Burying Ground which is currently the site of Charlestown High School. The Warren and Prescott schools later merged to form the Warren-Prescott School.

== Curriculum ==
The Warren-Prescott School follows the curriculum set by the Boston Public Schools. The school's students' test scores are competitive with other nearby Boston Public Schools, such as the Eliot School and the Josiah Quincy School.

== Programs and after-school activities ==
These activities are available to students after school hours. The kind of activities the students can participate in is sports, such as basketball, football, kickball, baseball, soccer and more. There is also dance practice, performing arts, visual art and crafts, how to write music and play instruments, and singing practice.

== Notable alumni ==
- James E. Hayes, Supreme Knight of the Knights of Columbus
