= Edward L. Hearn =

5th Supreme Knight of the Knights of Columbus

Count Edward Leo Hearn GCPO GCSG GCSS
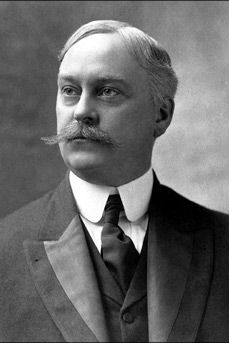
- Hearn in 1899

5th Supreme Knight of the Knights of Columbus
- In office April 1, 1899 – August 31, 1909
- Preceded by: John J. Cone
- Succeeded by: James A. Flaherty

Personal details
- Born: August 2, 1865 Fort Hill, Boston, Massachusetts, U.S.
- Died: July 12, 1946 (aged 81) Mamaroneck, New York, U.S.
- Spouse: Mary Hearn (née Healey)
- Children: 2
- Education: Hopkinton High School

Count Edward Leo Hearn GCPO GCSG GCSS (August 2, 1865 – July 12, 1945) was the fifth Supreme Knight of the Knights of Columbus from April 1, 1899, to August 31, 1909.

== Early life and career ==
Hearn was born in the Fort Hill neighborhood of Roxbury in Boston, Massachusetts, in 1865 to Irish immigrants. His father was a tailor, and he had two brothers and a sister. One brother, Edward, became a Jesuit priest. The family moved to Hopkinton, Massachusetts, and he graduated from Hopkinton High School.

Hearn had private tutors who prepared him for college, but upon graduation instead went to work at a shoe factory. He then became a traveling salesman and opened a shoe store in Laconia, New Hampshire. He eventually became president of the insurance firm the Casualty Company of America. For a time he lived in South Framingham, Massachusetts.

He was friends with Joseph Pelletier and Condé Benoist Pallen.

== Knights of Columbus ==
=== Massachusetts ===
Hearn was the founding grand knight of the Coeur de Leon Council of the Knights of Columbus in Framingham, Massachusetts. He served three terms as grand knight from 1894 to 1896, and from 1895 to 1899 was a supreme director of the order. In 1897 he was elected the second State Deputy of the Massachusetts Knights of Columbus from February 2, 1897, to September 1, 1899. As state deputy, he increased the number of councils to over 100, and to over 10,000 members.

=== Supreme Knight ===
At the 1899 convention, Hearn was in his hotel room when Congressman William S. McNary knocked on his door on the evening following the first session. McNary and several others entered his room and informed him that after a night of caucusing that he was their choice for Supreme Knight. Hearn initially declined, citing the demands of his job as a traveling salesman. He eventually agreed to allow his name to be put forth, and the next morning he was elected the fifth Supreme Knight in 1899 by a vote of 30-26. He would hold that office for ten years.

Following his election, Hearn moved to New Haven, Connecticut. During those years the number of councils grew from around 300 to over 1,300, membership climbed from 40,000 to nearly 230,000, and 40 new jurisdictions were established. The Order also spread further across the country in 31 states and the around globe in Mexico, Cuba, Panama, and the Philippines.

During a visit to Mexico City in September 1905 to oversee the establishment of Guadalupe Council number 1050, the first council south of the Rio Grande, he was greeted by Mexican President Porfirio Díaz at the home of John B. Frisbie. During his second visit the following February to confer the third degree, a banquet was held in his honor and he met with Archbishop Próspero Alarcón.

As Supreme Knight, he was instrumental in raising funds to endow a chair of American history at Catholic University of America. Hearn, who viewed the Order as a sort of Catholic anti-defamation league, said at the presentation of the check that "non-Catholic historians ... find no room in their histories to laud the magnificent work done in the early days of the nation by the Catholic missionaries and Catholic pioneers, ...These are the evils we seek to remedy by founding this Chair of American History." He also raised funds to establish a scholarship fund for graduate students to attend the national university.

As Supreme Knight, Hearn also oversaw the institution of the Fourth Degree of the order and was involved in Catholic anti-deformation efforts.

=== European work ===
Hearn declined another term as Supreme Knight, but retired from the insurance industry in 1910 so that he could work full-time with the Knights of Columbus. During and after the Knights' efforts in World War I, Hearn became the Knights' Overseas Commissioner, overseeing the order's support of the troops and post-war rehabilitation work.

He was also called upon by the Vatican to oversee several charitable works, including the Knights' project to build playgrounds for children in Rome. This request came at the personal request of Pope Benedict XV, who was worried about Protestant churches who were moving into Rome, dedicating churches on the "Anniversary of the Downfall of Papal Power," and setting up athletic facilities with the intent of converting the young people of Rome. Benedict's successor, Pope Pius XI, insisted that the facilities be open to all regardless of religion, a prospect which pleased Hearn, and donated a parcel of land for the project, that he could see from his apartment in the Vatican.

As Hearn was preparing to shut down the Order's work in Europe in the early 1920s, he reported back that Pope Benedict's request came as a surprise to him. Following the request, he proposed that the Knights should establish a headquarters in Rome where English speaking tourists could be received and at least two athletic fields with showering facilities to be overseen by Italians. The Board approved Hearn's requests and awarded him an initial salary of $6,000 a year, which was later increased to $10,000 a year.

Several years later, amid tensions between the Italian government and the Vatican, comments attributed to Hearn in a Paris newspaper caused the Vatican to ask the Knights to recall Hearn back to the United States. Hearn, who had already announced his intention to retire following the completion of a project in Rome, returned to the United States in the early 1930s. Upon his return, the Board authorized a temporary salary of $5,000 a year for Hearn to work as a consultant to the Order.

== Personal life and later years ==
Hearn was honored with the Order of St. Sylvester, Order of St. Gregory the Great, Order of Malta, and the Order of Bl. Pius IX. He was created a Papal count by Pope Pius XI in 1926. France awarded him the Legion of Honor and Belgium decorated him with the Order of Leopold II. He was also a Privy Chamberlain of the Order of the Sword and the Cape.

With his wife, Mary (née Healey), Hearn had one son and one daughter. (Note: His children were Edward L. Hearn, Jr. and Mrs. S.L. Steinwender.) After stepping down as Supreme Knight, he moved to Mamaroneck, New York.

Hearn died July 12, 1945, in Mamaroneck, and is interred at St. Peter's Cemetery in Great Barrington, Massachusetts. The gravesite was restored and a plaque was added in 1990.

== Works cited ==
- Lapomarda, Vincent A. (1992). The Knights of Columbus in Massachusetts (second ed.). Norwood, Massachusetts: Knights of Columbus Massachusetts State Council.
- Kauffman, Christopher J. (1982). Faith and Fraternalism: The History of the Knights of Columbus, 1882–1982. Harper and Row. ISBN 978-0-06-014940-6.

Religious titles
Preceded by John J. Cone	Supreme Knight of the Knights of Columbus; 1899-1909	Succeeded by James A. Flaherty
