= Patrick J. Moynihan =

Irish–American political and social leader (1891-1969)

Chairman of the Massachusetts Commission of Administration and Finance
- In office 1937–1941
- Preceded by: Charles P. Howard
- Succeeded by: Angier Goodwin

Massachusetts State Deputy of the Knights of Columbus
- In office 1936–1938
- Preceded by: Joseph H. Martin
- Succeeded by: John J. Spillane

Personal details
- Born: 1891 Killarney, Ireland
- Died: February 1, 1969 (aged 78) West Roxbury, Boston, Massachusetts, U.S.
- Resting place: Saint Mary's Cemetery; Needham, Massachusetts
- Party: Democratic
- Spouse: Nellie O'Donnell (died 1962)
- Children: 1
- Education: University of Dublin; Pace Institute
- Occupation: Teacher; Accountant; Government official

Patrick J. Moynihan (1891 – 1969) was an Irish–American political and social leader who served as Massachusetts state deputy of the Knights of Columbus from 1936 to 1938 and chairman of the state Commission of Administration and Finance from 1937 to 1941.

== Early life ==
Moynihan was born in Killarney in 1891. He graduated from De La Salle College Waterford and the University of Dublin and worked as a schoolteacher. He immigrated to the United States in 1912. Moynihan settled in New York City and found work as an accountant for Collier's. He graduated from the Pace Institute School of Accountancy and became a Certified Public Accountant. In 1919, he became a U.S. citizen. The following year, he moved to Boston, where he taught at the South Boston Evening High School and ran his own accounting firm.

== Knights of Columbus ==
In 1936, Moynihan was elected state deputy of the Massachusetts State Council of the Knights of Columbus. He was the first person born in Ireland to hold this position. At the 1937 Supreme Convention, Moynihan stunned delegates by nominating Deputy Supreme Knight Francis P. Matthews for Supreme Knight, but Matthews declined the nomination.

At the 1939 Supreme Convention in Seattle, Moynihan alleged that $787,124.04 had been misappropriated from mortuary funds in order to pay the salaries and expenses of supreme officers and supreme directors and called for an investigation into the order's finances. After making the allegations, Moynihan was suspended from the order by Supreme Knight Francis P. Matthews.

== Government service ==
In February 1937, Moynihan was appointed executive director of the city of Boston's welfare department. He removed three unqualified relatives of politically connected people from the city's welfare roles, but despite public pressure, refused to name the officials in order to keep his department's records confidential.

That December, he was appointed chairman of the Commission of Administration and Finance by Governor Charles F. Hurley. In this role, Moynihan and his four fellow commissioners advised the governor on state spending. On June 7, 1938, Moynihan issued an order that granted all state workers the right to organize and engage in collective bargaining, but not strike. Following the 1938 New England hurricane, Moynihan chaired the state emergency relief commission. Hurley's Republican successor, Leverett Saltonstall, chose not to reappoint Moynihan and on December 29, 1941, he was succeeded by Massachusetts Senate President Angier Goodwin.

From 1955 to 1962, Moynihan was the state's chief director of bank examiners.

== Later life ==
In 1945, Moynihan moved from his longtime home in Roslindale to Newtonville. From 1948 to 1955, he was a professor of accounting at Boston College and Merrimack College. His wife, Nellie (O'Donnell) Moynihan, died in 1962.

Moynihan died on February 1, 1969, at a nursing home in West Roxbury. His funeral mass was held at St. Theresa Church in West Roxbury and said by Bishop Jeremiah Francis Minihan. He was buried in Saint Mary's Cemetery in Needham, Massachusetts.
