= John J. Phelan =

2nd Supreme Knight of the Knights of Columbus

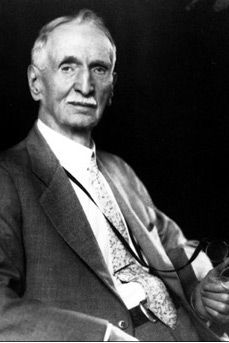
- John J. Phelan

2nd Supreme Knight of the Knights of Columbus
- In office May 17, 1886 – March 2, 1897
- Preceded by: James T. Mullen
- Succeeded by: James E. Hayes

Secretary of the State of Connecticut
- In office 1893–1895
- Preceded by: R. Jay Walsh
- Succeeded by: William C. Mowry

Personal details
- Born: June 24, 1851 County Wexford, Ireland, United Kingdom of Great Britain and Ireland
- Died: November 6, 1936 (aged 85) Bridgeport, Connecticut, U.S.
- Party: Democratic
- Spouse: Annie D. Fitzgerald (1879–1929)
- Education: New York University (LLB)
- Occupation: Lawyer

John Joseph Phelan (June 24, 1851 – November 6, 1936) was an American politician who served Secretary of the State of Connecticut, coroner of Fairfield County, Connecticut, and was a member of the Connecticut House of Representatives. He was also the second Supreme Knight of the Knights of Columbus.

== Early life and education ==
Phelan was born to Michael and Catherine (White) Phelan in County Wexford on June 24, 1851. He graduated from the Wexford Christian Brothers' School in 1865 and worked for his father's granite business. He and his father immigrated to the United States in 1870 and worked as a marble and granite cutter. He began studying law in 1874 and began practicing following his graduation from the New York University School of Law in 1878. On December 25, 1879 he married Annie D. Fitzgerald. They remained married until her death in 1929.

== Political career ==
Phelan began his political career in 1880 as a member of the Bridgeport Board of Aldermen. He was elected to the Connecticut House of Representatives in 1884. In 1896 he was the Democratic nominee for Speaker of the House. He became the Bridgeport city attorney in 1889. He was the Democratic nominee for Secretary of the State in 1890, however electoral challenges and a legislative deadlock prevented him from being seated. He was elected two years later and served from 1893 to 1895.

== Knights of Columbus ==
Phelan was not a founding member of the Knights. He joined the group in 1885. At the beginning of Phelan's leadership in 1886, there were just thirty-eight councils with about 2,700 members. After his time in office ended in 1897, there were 210 councils and nearly 17,000 members located in ten states. Phelan also served as chairman of the Connecticut delegation to the Catholic Congress and president of the Bridgeport chapter of the Irish National Land League. In 1925 he was made a Knight of the Order of St. Gregory the Great by Pope Pius XI.

== Later life ==
From 1909 to 1912 Phelan was a member a member of the Bridgeport board of appointment. In 1912 he was appointed coroner of Fairfield County. He held the office until his death on November 6, 1936.

Religious titles
Preceded by James T. Mullen	Supreme Knight of the Knights of Columbus; 1886-1897	Succeeded by James E. Hayes
