= Red Knights (fraternal society) =

1874 group founded in New Haven, Connecticut

The Red Knights was a group founded in New Haven, Connecticut in 1874 as one of many ethnic mutual benefit societies in the city. Its members were young upwardly mobile Irish who saw the group as a vehicle for social advancement. The group failed for lack of a viable insurance plan, and many of the members went on to found or join the Knights of Columbus.
