= Catholic Order of Foresters =

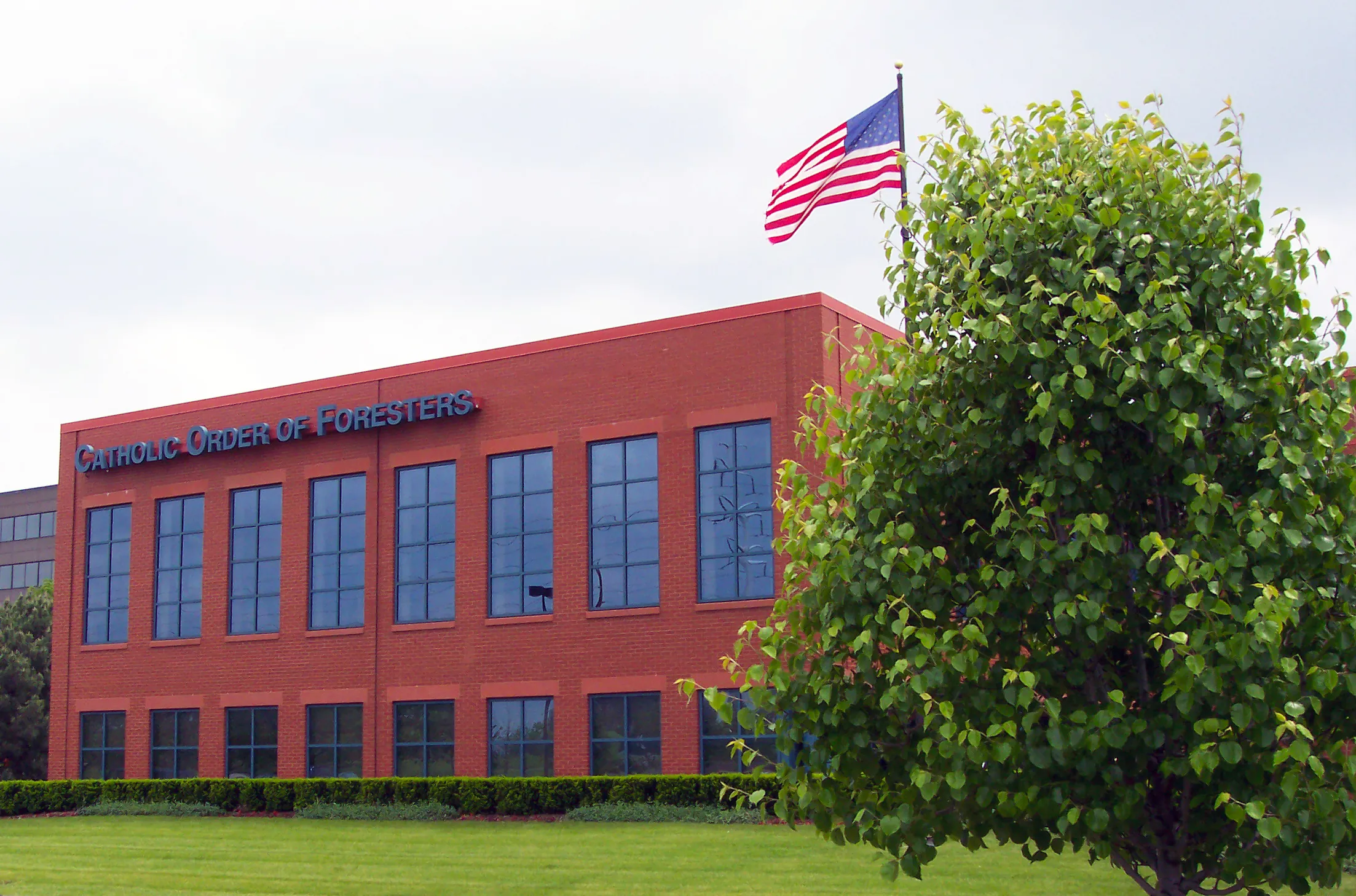
Catholic Order of Foresters' office in Naperville, Illinois

Headquartered in Naperville, Illinois, Catholic Order of Foresters is a fraternal benefit society in the United States that provides life insurance and financial services while promoting community, charity, and fellowship through Catholic principles.

Disgruntled members of the Independent Order of Foresters split off to form two organizations, both named the Catholic Order of Foresters, in Massachusetts in 1879 and in Chicago, Illinois, in 1883.

== Massachusetts ==
The Massachusetts Catholic Order of Foresters (MCOF) was founded by Irish immigrants in 1879 with the purpose of providing life insurance benefits for its members. In 1893, there were 95 local branches throughout Massachusetts, including several catering to German immigrants. Women were admitted beginning in 1894. As of 1930, there were 60,000 members in Massachusetts and at least one branch in Rhode Island. The MCOF was renamed the Catholic Association of Foresters in 1960.

The records of MCOF are held by the University Archives and Special Collections in the Joseph P. Healy Library at the University of Massachusetts Boston.
