= Patrick Henry (packet) =

19th-century square-rigged sailing ship

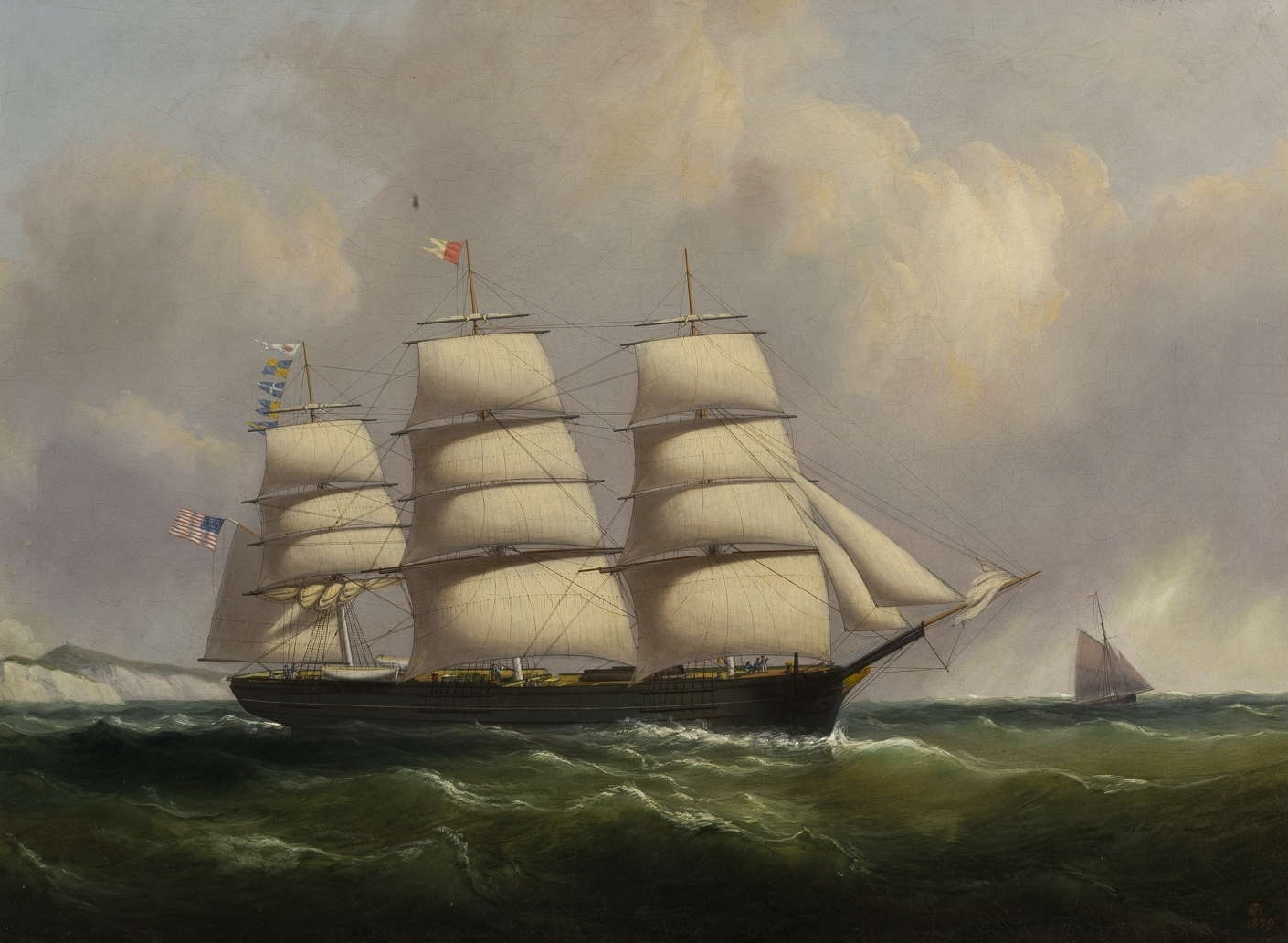
- The American Packet Ship "Patrick Henry" off the Cliffs of Dover, by Philip John Ouless (British, 1817–1885)

History

United States
- Owner: Grinnell, Minturn & Co, New York
- Builder: Brown & Bell of New York
- Cost: $90,000 ($2.58 million today)
- Laid down: 1838
- Launched: October 10, 1839
- In service: 1839
- Out of service: 1864

United Kingdom
- Owner: J.P. Allen & Co., Naval and Military Tailors, Londonderry, Ireland. (1864–68) Pim & Co., Cork, Ireland; James Edwin Pim, Esq., J.P. (1868–1884)
- Acquired: 1864; re-registered as barque
- Out of service: 1883
- Fate: Went aground, Cansh bank, off Lancashire, U.K., 1883; broken up, 1884

General characteristics
- Type: Packet
- Tonnage: 880/905 tons (US) (old/new measurement); 837 tons/854 tons/773 tons as barque (net/gross/under deck)
- Length: 159 ft (48 m) LOD (US)
- Beam: 34 ft 10 in (10.62 m) (US)
- Draft: 18 ft (5.5 m) LOD (US)
- Depth: 21 ft 10 in (6.65 m)(US)
- Notes: US and UK measurements differ as measuring systems had slightly different rules.

The Patrick Henry (packet) was a three-masted, square-rigged, merchant-class, sailing packet ship that transported mail, newspapers, merchandise and thousands of people from 1839 to 1864, during the Golden Age of Sail, primarily between Liverpool and New York City, as well as produce, grains and clothing to aid in humanitarian efforts during an Gorta Mór.

== History ==
The Patrick Henry was designed and constructed between 1838 and 1839 by the shipbuilding firm Brown & Bell, at the foot of Stanton Street and Houston Street on the East River in New York City. The ship was named for American Founding Father Patrick Henry.

Company principal and shipbuilder Jacob Bell hired a young shipwright named Donald McKay, who helped design and build her. McKay became a world-famous naval architect, and was known for the designs of his record-setting extreme clippers.

The Patrick Henry was launched from her construction docks into the East River on Thursday, October 10, 1839.

She was registered on November 6, 1839, at 880/905 tons (old/new measurement) and was 159 feet in length, 34 feet 10 inches in beam, and 21 feet 10 inches in depth of hold, with two decks and a draft of eighteen feet.

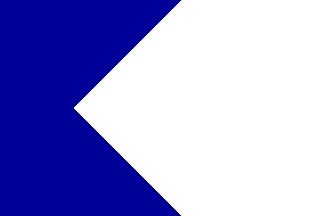
Flag of Grinnell, Minturn & Co.'s Blue Swallowtail Line of Packets, flown on American Packet Ship Patrick Henry, from 1839 to 1852

The ship was named in honor of American attorney, planter, politician, orator and Founding Father best known for his declaration to the Second Virginia Convention: "Give me liberty or give me death!" A new edition of the classic biography Sketches of the Life and Character of Patrick Henry, by William Wirt, was released the following month (December 1839), by Adlard & Saunders, New York, publishers at 46 Broadway. A revised edition was published by Thomas, Cowperthwait & Co., Philadelphia, the same year.

The vessel was built to handle forty first-class passengers, "one thousand tons of merchandise" and featured "the full-length figure of the Virginian for her figurehead." She was said to cost $90,000, more than $2.5 million today, though no contract could be located.

She sailed in the Blue Swallowtail Line (Fourth Line) of Packets, of Grinnell, Minturn & Co., between New York and Liverpool from 1839 until 1852 when she transferred to the Red Swallowtail Line of Packets between New York and London.

Packet ships were named for the "packets" of mail they originally were designed to transport after which they began carrying freight and passengers and engaged in the packet trade. They are the predecessors of the 20th-century ocean liner and were the first to sail between American and European ports on regular schedules. Used extensively in European coastal mail services since the 17th century, they gradually added cramped passenger accommodation. The first scheduled transatlantic packet company, the Black Ball Line "Old Line," began operating January 1, 1818, offering a monthly service between New York and Liverpool with four ships. In 1821, Byrnes, Grimble & Co. inaugurated the Red Star Line of Liverpool Packets, with the four ships Panther, Hercules, Manhattan and Meteor. In 1822, Messrs Fish, Grinnell & Co. began the Swallowtail Line, known as the "Fourth Line of Packets for New York," their first ships being the Silas Richards, Napoleon, George and York, which soon moved to bi-weekly service. By 1825, vessels were advertised as leaving New York on the 8th and leaving Liverpool on the 24th of every month. Their actual schedules eventually varied, sometimes wildly, due to weather and other conditions.

A Yankee captain of an American packet never takes "off his clothes to go to bed, during the whole voyage," according to an early Emigrants' Guide. "The consequence of this great watchfulness is, that, advantage is taken of every puff of wind, while the risk from the squalls and sudden gusts is, in a great measure, obviated." For a "quick and safe passage," American packets were the best. "The Americans sail faster than others, owing to the greater skill and greater vigilance of the captains, and to their great sobriety..."

The Patrick Henry was developed as a "make-weight," or competitive response, to the Rosicus, a 1,030-ton packet ship built the previous year (1838) by the same shipyard that built the PH, Brown & Bell, for the new competitor, the Dramatic Line of Atlantic packets (Collins Line). Twelve years later (1851), Moses H. Grinnell, investor in the Patrick Henry and partner in Grinnell, Minturn & Co. purchased, for $90,000, the Flying Cloud, arguably the greatest clipper ship ever built. It sailed from New York to San Francisco (rounding Cape Horn) in 89 days and eight hours (1854), a record that held for 130 years.

== Performance ==
The Patrick Henry's westward passages averaged 34 days, her shortest passage being 22 days, her longest 46 days. Beginning in 1852 her westbound passages averaged 32 days, her shortest passage being 26 days, her longest 41 days. The vessel's best homeward crossing of 22 days was better than the crossings of either of the grander packets: the Swallowtail's Cornelius Grinnell (built in 1850, 1,100 tons) and the Black Ball Line's Great Western (built in 1851, 1,443 tons). Her longest run in the London-Portsmouth run at 41 days was even better than the Grinnell (48 days) or the New World (built in 1846, 1,400 tons) (42 days), one of the largest Swallowtails. The Patrick Henry was among only four packets of the day—Montezuma, Southampton, St. Andrew, and the prestigious clipper Dreadnought—to make the eastbound passage from New York to Liverpool in fourteen days or less. Only two transatlantic sailing packets showed a better average speed record on the westbound crossing for a period of twenty-five years or more (thirty-three days) and only one equaled her average performance.

By 1843 four lines of packets were advertising sailings on eighteen different ships between Liverpool and New York, every month, on the 1st, 7th, 13th, 19th and 25th. The Patrick Henry, Capt. Delano, was the first advertised.

== Construction ==
The Patrick Henry mirrored her namesake in her radical nature, according to the Mayor of New York Philip Hone, who kept a diary said to be the most extensive and detailed on the first half of the US in the 19th century. "She is the ne plus ultra, or will be, until another ship of her class shall be built," he wrote in October 1839 after touring the "splendid new ship" with Henry Grinnell, one of her owners. For five years, the Patrick Henry was the largest packet ship among New York's eight packet lines.

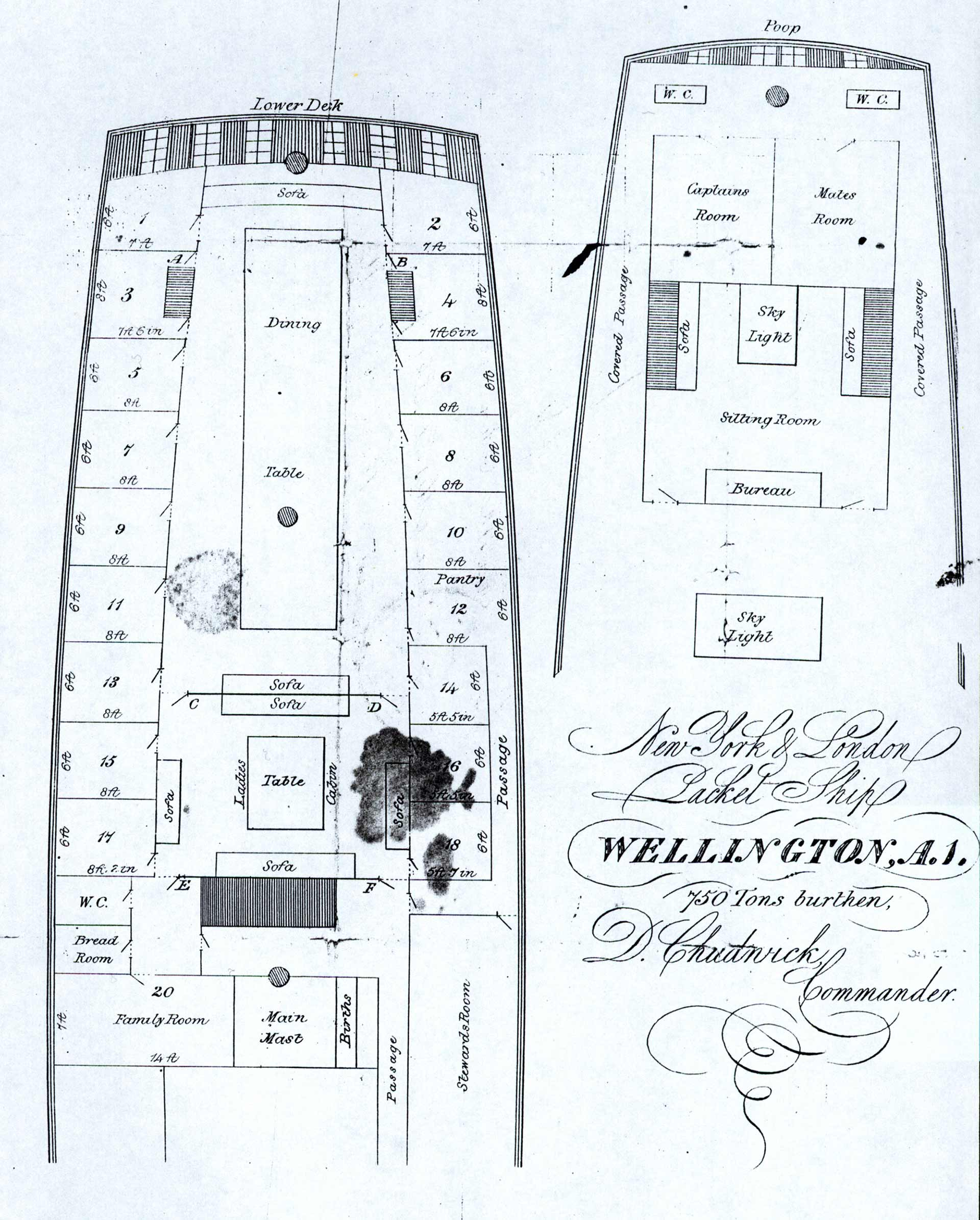
Plan of Packet Ship Wellington (1837, 750 tons), built by Christian Bergh & Co., New York. The vessel served the Red Swallowtail Line between New York and London from 1837 to 1850. Its beam was a foot shorter than the Patrick Henry.

"This fine new ship, which arrived on Monday last, after a smart passage, is now lying at the east side of the Prince's Dock," according to a lengthy review of her construction published in the Liverpool Standard and General Commercial Advertiser after her maiden voyage. "She is of about a thousand tons burden, new measurement; was built for Messrs. Grinnell and Minturn's line of packets, (consigned to Messrs. Wildes, Pickersgill and Co., of this town), by Messrs. Brown and Bell, of New York, and is in every point a first-rate ship. A New York contemporary says, in noticing this vessel—"To speak of new packets is so common an occurrence, that it attracts but little attention. Nautical men, however, are never tired of seeing a new ship. A large number of gentlemen, familiar with the science of ship-building, have visited this extraordinary vessel, and have pronounced her to be, in every respect, one of the finest ships now belonging to this or any other port." Our contemporary will be gratified to learn that many gentlemen, equally versed in naval architecture, on this side the Atlantic, have visited the "Patrick Henry," and express a high opinion, corroborative of that of their Transatlantic brethren. As we feel assured—such is the interest taken in whatever belongs to navigation in this maritime country—that not only nautical, but mercantile men, and Englishmen generally, are never weary of hearing of improvement in naval architecture, we shall notice this new packet-ship more particularly.

"The "Patrick Henry" is built of the very best materials, including live oak, African oak, elm, &c. She is of a fine model for a merchant vessel, has a handsome figure-head and decorated stern, and looks fine and warlike in the water.

"She bears a strong resemblance to the "Roscius," one of the very finest packet-ships on the station; and, like her, has a poop deck (under which is the range of cabins), and a topgallant forecastle, but without a spar deck, the main deck being open, and running (including the cabin sole) fore-and-aft. She is fastened in a superior manner, and is neatly rigged in the usual square style of the large fast vessels, amongst which she takes a conspicuous place. The entrance or smoking cabin, forming a vestibule to the main saloon, is at the extreme stern, lighted by the stern windows; and the floor is a few steps below the quarter-deck, the upper part or roof rising three or four feet above it. In the fore part of this is the wheel, with a window in front; so that the helmsman is completely sheltered from the weather, and has, at the same time, a sufficient view of the sails and the effect of the rudder on the movements of the ship. Two neat staircases, one on each side, lead to the grand cabin or saloon.

=== Saloon and staterooms ===
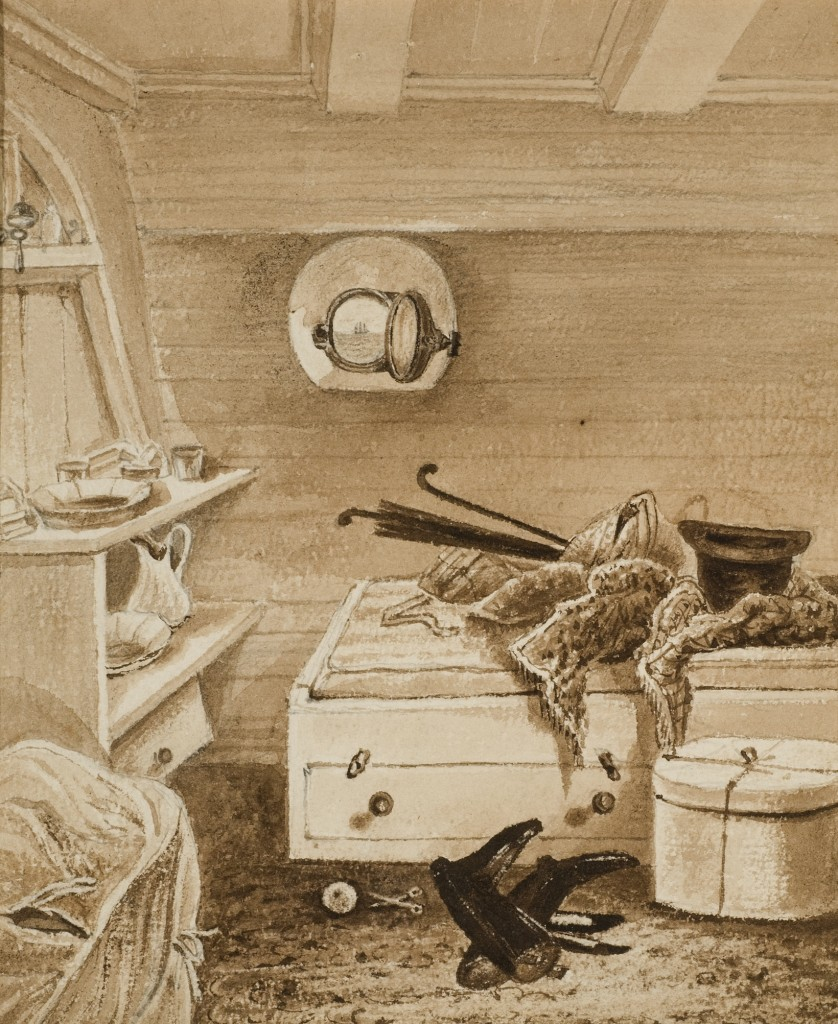
Stateroom on Packet Ship Margaret Evans, 1851

"The saloon is a splendid apartment, of about fifteen yards in length. ["Saloon" refers to shared common space on sailing ships onto which staterooms or cabins opened, often used for dining and drinking.] The sides are beautifully empanelled in the finest choice wood of "every clime," in nearly the same style as the cabin of the "Roscius," forming an exceedingly rich and effective specimen of cabinet work.

"The styles of the doors and intermediate paneling are of satin wood; the centres of the panels of the same, and also (the middle small panels) of the root of the American ash tree—a beautiful feathered white wood. The sunk parts or mouldings of those are of dark rosewood and zebra wood—the latter finely streaked and clouded. In the top panel of each of the state-room doors, which is of satin wood, is an oval Venetian blind, also of satin wood. Between each door and compartment, are convex pilasters—fourteen on each side—of rosewood thrown out on a broad convex ground or back-work of zebra-wood.

"These pilasters are of satin-wood, inlaid with ebony, and with a central ornament. The bases of these are in imitation of dark veined marble: and the capitals are also inlaid, and richly gilded. The cornice is of dark wood and mahogany, with gilded mouldings. The contrast formed by these various coloured woods is striking; yet the whole harmonizes, and has a splendid and gorgeous effect. The ladies' cabin, farther forward, adjoins the saloon, the two forming, by the lowering of a large panel between, hung in the manner of a window, one continuous apartment of great length and elegance. It is finished in the same style as the other, and may be entered from the main deck, with which both cabins are flush.

"Fronting the main deck is a fine stainedglass window. The state, or sleeping rooms, each containing two berths, are finished in front with polished rose, satin, and zebra wood to correspond. They are at once light and airy, each having a large side or port window, and a patent deck light. They are twenty-four in number, in all; and will consequently accommodate forty-eight passengers. The furniture in both cabins is appropriate and neat. The tables are of mahogany. At the upper end of the saloon there is a sofa across the full breadth of the apartment, double the length of ordinary sofas. Over this is fixed a handsome mirror. The subsidiary accommodations are of the first order. The steward's pantry, leading out of the ladies' cabin, and with an entrance from the main deck, is unusually spacious, and is replete with glass, china ware, &c., for the dispensing of "the good things of this life." In fine, the Patrick Henry is a well-built, well-found, and beautiful vessel. She will form a valuable addition to the line ships running between this port and New York, and we wish her every success."

== Maiden voyage ==
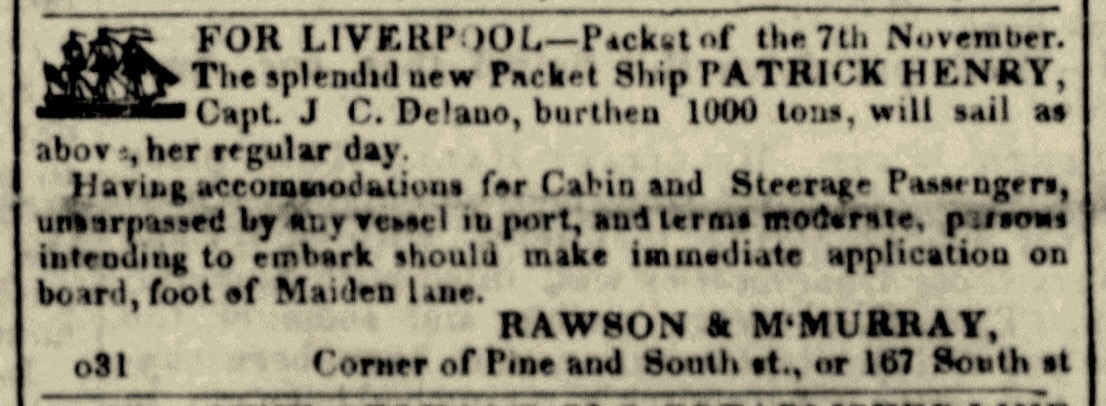
Advertisement for her maiden voyage, published November 6, 1839

Five days before her maiden voyage, on November 2, 1839, the New York Morning Herald published an article titled, "Fête On Board The Patrick Henry," that documented a "neat little ... pic-nic, or collation" given by its widely respected captain, "aboard the splendid new ship," and, "attended by all the elite." The reviewer called the vessel, "a perfect bijou," and wrote that "[h]er cabins are superb, her quarter-deck very convenient, and the new arrangement in the poop is admirable. Captain Delano is filling rapidly up with passengers..."

She sailed on November 7 and arrived in England seventeen days later, on the 25th. The Morning Post (London) announced: “Liverpool, Monday—By the arrival of the splendid new packet-ship Patrick Henry, Captain Delano, which entered the Mersey about one o'clock this day, after an extremely rapid passage of little more than seventeen days, New York papers to the 7th inst., inclusive, have been received.”

The Liverpool Standard and General Commercial Advertiser reported Captain Delano as "a gentleman whose skill as a seaman, and urbanity as a man, are well known and highly appreciated" and listed its first passengers:"...namely:—Mr. Baker, Mrs. Baker and sister, Boston; Mr. Peers, Mrs. Peers and daughter, Liverpool; Mr. Alfred, London; Mr. Davoren, Jamaica; Mr. Short, (King's Own) and Mrs. Short; Mrs. Wilson, New York; Mr. Carlsheim, Frankfort; Mr. Adie, Edinburgh; Mr. Thompson, Glasgow."

== Owners ==
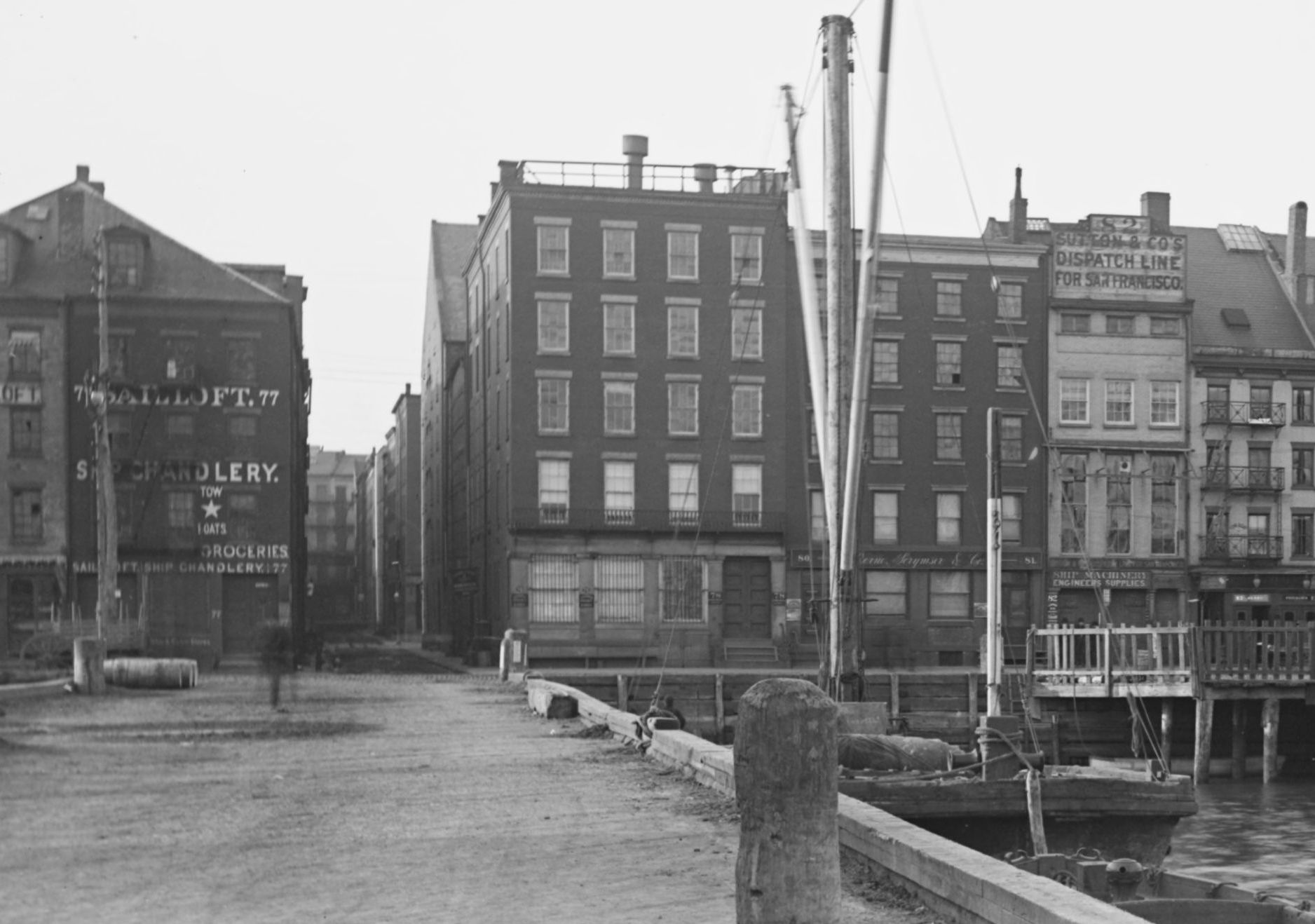
"South Street from Maiden Lane to Burling Slip, New York City, February 23, 1891." Courtesy New-York Historical Society. Depicts (center) the former offices of Grinnell, Minturn & Co. and Burling Slip in the foreground (right)

The Patrick Henry was purchased and owned by the once preeminent New York Shipping House Grinnell, Minturn & Co., a conglomerate of merchant and sailing magnates with New England Quaker roots. In 1851, she was owned by: Henry Grinnell (3/16), Moses H. Grinnell and Robert B. Minturn (8/16), Capt. Sheldon G. Hubbard (1/16), Capt. Joseph Rogers (2/16), and Capt. Joseph C. Delano (2/16). "During the days of sailing vessels, the house of Grinnell, Minturn & Co. was one of the wealthiest and most extensively engaged in business in the United States, and it is still among the most prominent in its line of business in the city," according to an 1881 issue of the New York Times.

Partners Robert B. Minturn, Franklin H. Delano, Moses H. Grinnell and brother Henry Grinnell were among the wealthiest of the merchant-kings of New York in their day, who built one of 19th century America's largest transportation empires with a one-time fleet of more than fifty ships that sailed to every continent. In 1845, before the height of the emigrant trade from which the firm was profiting, Minturn was reported to be worth $200,000; today's equivalent (2020) of more than $2.31 billion in relative output. The Grinnells were worth $250,000, each, or near $5.8 billion combined; and partner Delano, who had married into the Astor family, was valued at what today would be roughly $5.76 billion when measuring what is called "relative output."

Fellow shipping magnate A.A. Low wrote sarcastically about Moses and Robert in a letter to a sibling: "Our friends, Grinnell, Minturn are heartbroken about the famine. They have a house dinner to celebrate the fortune it is bringing them, and dine on terrapin, salmon, peas, asparagus, strawberries—all out of season, of course—then Mr. Grinnell gives the famine fund $360, which he had lost on a bet with Mr. Wetmore William S. Wetmore, founder of rival China trade firm Wetmore & Company]."

Minturn served as a vice president on the relief committee that eventually sent the Macedonian, June 19, 1847, with supplies to Ireland, and was a Commissioner of Emigration and a founder of the Association for Improving the Condition of the Poor. Minturn reportedly once noted that the $5 million spent on ship fares in 1847, "substantially reduced the cost of carrying freight," and helped the economy by lowering the price of American cotton and grain for English buyers. According to the website, An Irish Passenger, An American Family, And Their Time, profit, "rather than humanitarian impulses" drove immigration, "and because government regulatory agencies and private philanthropies were unwilling or unable to exert much control over that business, 19th century emigrants were often literally treated as human freight."

In 1844, Minturn offered Irish Catholic priest and teetotalist reformer Father Mathew free passage in any of their ships to come visit America, which he accepted in 1849, aboard the Ashburton (1842, 1,015 tons), beginning a two-year visit during which he acquired 600,000 followers who took his temperance pledge to treat alcohol abuse, alcohol dependence and alcoholism. Father Mathew befriended Frederick Douglass when Douglass visited Ireland in 1845. The priest wanted to remain singularly focused on helping people stop drinking alcohol and was criticized for not speaking out against slavery and foregoing the abolitionist cause, a complicated issue for the immigrant Irish Catholics who, some historians suggest, were competing with Blacks for jobs in the U.S. at the time.

Minturn, with Quaker forebears, was an abolitionist reported to have purchased a number of slaves for the purpose of setting them free. He was a benefactor of the Freedmen's Association and one of the co-founders of Children's Village. He provided evidence before Parliament in 1848 that teetotalism was encouraged by American shipowners as underwriters offered "a return of 10% off the premium on voyages performed without the consumption of spirits."

Robert Minturn died suddenly at age 60 in 1866. Fifteen years later, his second-born son, John Wendell Minturn, aged 42 and a principal owner of Grinnell, Minturn & Co with his older brother, died of suicide at 78 South Street, the company's headquarters. John was born the year the Patrick Henry was first launched. Donated lands of the family estate in Hastings, New York, were instrumental in the development of an 184-acre retreat, children's home and school in the 1890s that no longer exists. Robert Bowne Minturn's granddaughters were immortalized in an 1899 miniature oil painting held by the New-York Historical Society.

== Captain ==
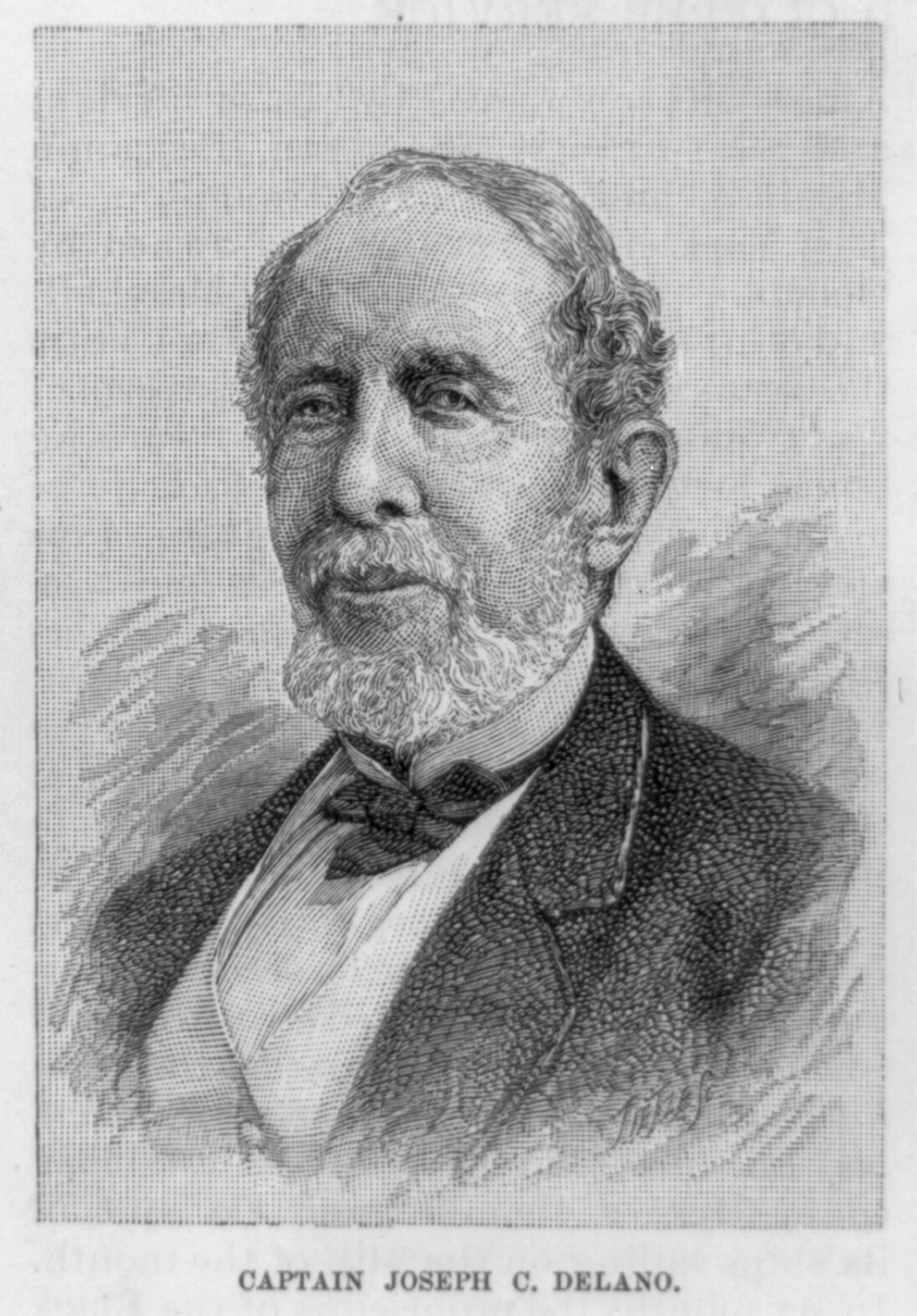
Captain Joseph Clement Delano of the Patrick Henry

Her primary commander was Captain Joseph Clement Delano (1796–1886), New Bedford, Mass., of the famed Delano family with its many prominent mariners, whalers and shipbuilders whose commercial success advanced the family into the Massachusetts aristocracy, sometimes referred to as one of the Boston Brahmins (the "First Families of Boston"). Joseph was first cousin to Franklin Delano Roosevelt's maternal grandfather Warren Delano Jr., the American merchant who made a large fortune smuggling illegal opium into China.

Joseph's first voyage may have been at age fifteen, in January 1812, when he sailed aboard the Arab, a merchantman launched in 1810 from Fairhaven, Mass., and owned by his paternal grandfather Captain Warren Delano, Sr., the great-grandfather of Franklin Delano Roosevelt. The following year, in May, he was aboard the Hampton Roads, and on March 26, 1815, he wrote a letter aboard the Ship Virginia. On Christmas Day, 1818, he was aboard the Lagoda, a merchantman built at New Bedford that plied the Baltic and carried Russian iron.

In 1826, Delano began as commander of the Columbia (built 1821, 492 tons), in what was then Fish, Grinnell & Co.'s London Red Swallowtail Line. In April 1830, he arrived at New York during the night, with a record westbound passage of only 15 days and 18 hours during which her average speed was 8 1/2 knots, a record that stood for 16 years.

Packet ship commanders came to be "regarded as the aristocracy of the seas." In 1831, he hosted the American ornithologist, naturalist, and painter John James Audubon on several voyages during which Audubon, among others, shot two dozen Petrels. On another venture, Audubon recorded sketches of hundreds of Palaropes along a bank of seaweeds and froth, sixty miles off the coast of Nantucket. In 1833, Captain Delano transferred to the Liverpool Blue Swallowtail Line, as master of the Roscoe (1832, 622 tons) and then the Patrick Henry.

After three years of command, the captain was reviewed by Theodore Ledyard Culyer, leading Presbyterian minister and religious writer, who sailed with him in 1842. "As the stormy Atlantic had not yet been carpeted by six-day steamers, I crossed in a fine new packet-ship, the Patrick Henry... Captain Joseph C. Delano was a gentleman of high intelligence and culture who, after he had abandoned salt water, became an active member of the American Association of Science."

In 1847, Captain Delano was consulted by Captain Robert Bennett Forbes regarding the historic and unprecedented U.S. government-sponsored humanitarian voyage of the U.S. Navy's sloop-of-war USS Jamestown, carrying relief supplies from Boston, Mass. to Cork, Ireland, that year. "While preparing for sea, I consulted Captain J. C. Delano, of New Bedford," Forbes wrote. "[Delano] said that on the last days of March we would sail on the very worst day of the year for England, and that if we got to Cork in thirty days we ought to be well satisfied." The ship, leaving on March 28 and arriving on April 12, took just sixteen days.

Captain Delano commanded the Patrick Henry between 1839 and 1845 and again between 1847 and 1849. His younger brother, John Allerton Delano, served as his first mate and later commanded the vessel as well. Delano the elder retired from sea in 1848 but returned to helm an 1851 voyage of his brother's charge, the American Packet Ship Albert Gallatin (built 1849, 1,435 tons), before becoming partner in a cotton mill and a business importing boghead coal.

Though the Patrick Henry served more than ten captains through her quarter century of voyages, Capt. Joseph Delano was "said to have made more money for her tonnage than any other ship in their service."

"Between 1842 and 1847, inclusive, twenty-nine new Western Ocean lines were formed," according to Queens of the Western Ocean: The Story of America's Mail and Passenger Sailing Lines. The busiest years for the Patrick Henry, and its firm, were between 1847 and 1851 when 2,769 passenger ships, mostly packets, sailed from Liverpool, carrying 765,159 passengers. Between 1845 and 1855 more than two million people left Ireland, on primarily packet ships but also steamboats and barks—one of the greatest mass exoduses from a single island in history.

According to a review of passenger manifests across two decades, the Patrick Henry transported more than 12,000 passengers.

== Crew ==
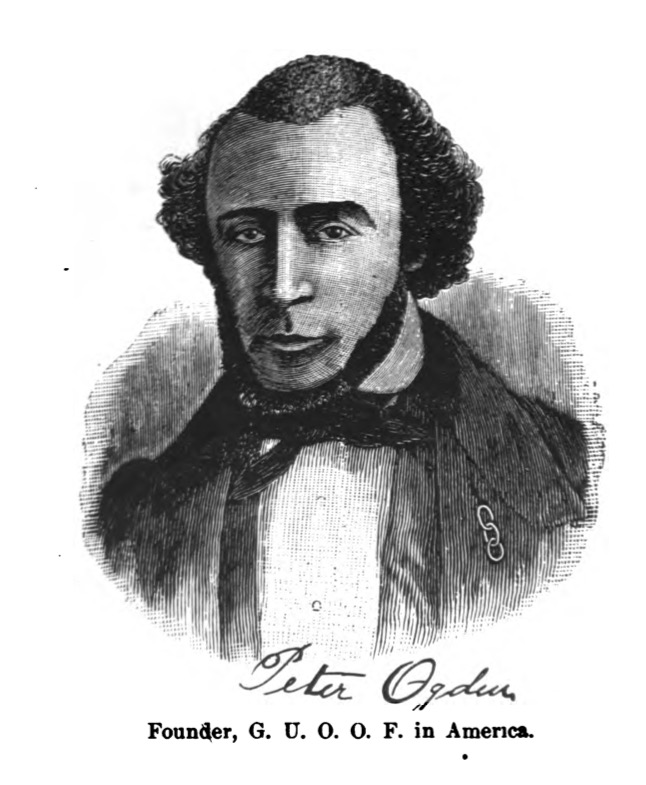
Peter Ogden, Founder of the Grand United Order of Odd Fellows in America

An early notable crew member was Peter Ogden, who served as steward on the Patrick Henry. The steward on packet ships was considered a high-ranking service position. He was generally responsible for feeding and dressing the captain, mates and passengers. An early description of the steward refers to him wearing "a brilliant-coloured morning-gown and red slippers" though this is considered to romanticize the role. Oftentimes, the steward was free, Black and multilingual.

Ogden was a Black man and member of Victoria Lodge, No. 448, of the original British Grand United Order of Odd Fellows. He travelled frequently between Liverpool and New York with Captain Delano and was informed that the Philomathaen Institute had been rejected from the all-white Independent Order of Odd Fellows in America. During a visit to England, Ogden appealed to the Grand United Order, which did not discriminate against skin color and was granted the charter on March 1, 1843. Ogden returned to New York and established the Philomathean Lodge, No. 646 of the Grand United Order of Odd Fellows in America, soon to be the largest national Black fraternal organization in America. Ogden had dissuaded the New York group from applying to the U.S. Order thus:

"[Ogden] thought it folly, a waste of time, if not self-respect, to stand, hat in hand, at the foot-stool of a class of men who, professing benevolence and fraternity, were most narrow and contracted, a class of men who judged another, not by principle and character, but by the shape of the nose, the curl of the hair, and the hue of the skin. He averred that the dispensation could be secured through his Lodge in Liverpool, and that to be connected with England and the Grand United Order was to obtain Odd Fellowship in its pristine purity."

== Notable voyages ==
Between 1839 and 1864, the packet ship Patrick Henry made at least 60 (documented) roundtrip crossings, carrying passengers, specie, a wide range of newspapers, magazines and periodicals, personal letters and packages, business mail, transactions and documents, merchandise, freight and cargo, including large shipments of wheat and flour on commission for the Baring Brothers.

=== Early career ===
The Patrick Henry hosted six of the Twelve Apostles of the Latter Day Saint movement including George A. Smith and Brigham Young on a voyage from New York to Liverpool, where they began their mission in England as prophesied by Joseph Smith. At sea for 28 days in March 1840, Captain Joseph Delano and crew teased the group, calling them "landlubbers." "During our passage over we had two very heavy gales;" wrote Apostle Heber C. Kimball. "The ship's mate said he had not seen such for fifteen years back: the ship's crew was kind to us." Brigham Young was "so sick that he was confined to his berth nearly the entire voyage". The ailing Young was so thankful to set foot on land that he "gave a loud shout of hosanna." In June 1845, the Patrick Henry, commanded by Captain Joseph Delano, hosted Horatio Potter, the educator and the sixth bishop of the Episcopal Diocese of New York, who was offered free passage on the Patrick Henry by one of its owners, Robert Bowne Minturn, after he spoke to his friend about a "slight irritation about the throat" and a need for rest. Potter wrote in a letter dated May 26, 1845, to the vestry of St. Peter's Church, in Albany, where he was rector: "I feel that a sea voyage, removing me from all labor and care, giving me the benefit of sea air and travel in a foreign land, with time and opportunity to refresh my mind as well as my body, would be a great relief and a great benefit, not only to myself personally, but to my spiritual charge."

=== Vs. the William J. Romer ===
On February 9, 1846, hundreds of people gathered at the Battery overlooking the East River to watch the beginning of a notable, singular regatta from New York to Liverpool between what was considered one of the fastest pilot boats, the fifty-ton schooner William J. Romer, and the Patrick Henry, captained by Joseph's younger brother and former first mate, John Allerton Delano (1809–1893). Rumors circulated about the "mysterious" mission of the Romer. Was she to bring Queen Victoria? Did she carry news of the Oregon negotiation? Another was that she took six "heavy brass cannon" and was going "pirating or privateering."

"As 12 o'clock began to draw nigh, the hands on board began to clear up the deck," one newspaper reporter wrote. "[A]nd a few minutes after 12, she rounded the pier and shot out into the river as neat as a courser. As she left the wharf, the assembled crowd sent out nine hearty cheers, which were returned from the boat in the same manner, and by the firing of a gun...About 4 o'clock, the packet ship Patrick Henry came down the river, and as she was passing out by Governor's Island, the pilot boat took a sudden start and shot across the bows of the packet, and soon left her far behind.

The Romer carried a member of the Associated Press and a British attache and indeed brought communications from then Secretary of State James Buchanan, attracting much press, but it hit heavy gales, with thunder and lightning, and went to port at Cork. The Patrick Henry won the race.

=== Fare and conditions ===
The "real price" in today's currency for what would have been a single, first-class (cabin or stateroom) passage on the Patrick Henry in January 1846 is $3037.92, or £25 in 1846; the price for one adult steerage ticket is between $500 and $750 today, or £4 and £6 in 1846. Steerage refers to the cargo hold. The gross receipts from passengers (at full capacity) on a single crossing of the PH across the Atlantic, from Liverpool to New York, would amount to as much as $225,000 today.

In April 1846, with 383 primarily Irish passengers aboard the Patrick Henry, one steerage passenger wrote, "Of all the ships I have ever seen, this beat them all for disorder. There was neither rule, order, nor any kind of cleanliness observed." The writer suggested government inspectors shirked their duty because of "patronage" in the "chain of the aristocracy."

"The way in which passengers are stowed away in these ships is shameful. Sometimes the Irish steamers don't bring their quota of passengers till the ship is on the point of sailing; then they are all huddled together, old and young, male and female, in the same berth; often four in one berth. For instance, in this ship, there were in one berth, three young girls going to their friends, about 16, 17, and 18 years of age, and an old man, 64 years, and the whole four entire strangers to each other till they met in the ship. There were a great many more cases equally bad. Several of the passengers expostulated with the captain on this strange usage, but the only answer he would give was, that he had nothing to do with it, as they had paid their money to agents."

The writer suggested that two deaths occurred (which the manifest bears out), including five-year-old Thomas Healy, due to neglect from the crew and the captain. The writer accuses the crew of robbing passengers "of money, spirits, tea, coffee, and sugar," breaking into lockers and stealing, and going unpunished, as well as "prowling about the ship to find some simple females who will hearken to them." Joseph's brother John Delano was captain on the voyage. "The captain of this ship was a most inhuman man," the passenger wrote. "He did not seem to think the life of a passenger worthy of notice, particularly an Irish one; although, as his name would indicate, of Irish extraction himself. I am told that his real name was Delaney."

=== Black '47 ===
In arguably the worst year of the Great Famine, on May 6 and again on September 7, 1847, the Patrick Henry, under Captain Joseph Delano, left the Burling Slip on South Street in New York and transported relief from societies in Brooklyn (primarily May 6 run), Albany, Rochester, New York, the State of Ohio, and Burlington, New Jersey, that included clothing, Indian corn, cornmeal, rye, wheat, peas, beans, flour, meal, barley, buckwheat, bread and pork, to Liverpool, valued at the time at $4,636.22 (May: $1,166.07; Sept: $3,470.15), today worth about $150,000, to be distributed by the Committee of Society of Friends in Dublin to the people of Ireland. The Patrick Henry under Captain Delano may have made her first humanitarian voyage in February 1846, when she was reported to carry "a very large cargo, principally of breadstuffs" to Cork, Ireland.

The New York Herald reported that the PH arrived at Liverpool in May with the "largest cargo of biscuits yet imported." The HM Treasury, at the time, allowed "biscuits" to be imported duty-free, excepting "fancy biscuit" or "confectionery," but only until September 1." The September shipment is listed as containing the following: 2,143 bushels of corn; 25 bushels of rye; 290 barrels of meal; 96 barrels of flour; 34 barrels of meal; 5 boxes barley; 7 barrels of wheat; 51 barrels of rye flour; 3 barrels of beans; 1 barrel of peas; 14 packages of clothing; 192 barrels of corn; 2 barrels of pork; 8 barrels of sundries; and four packages of clothing.

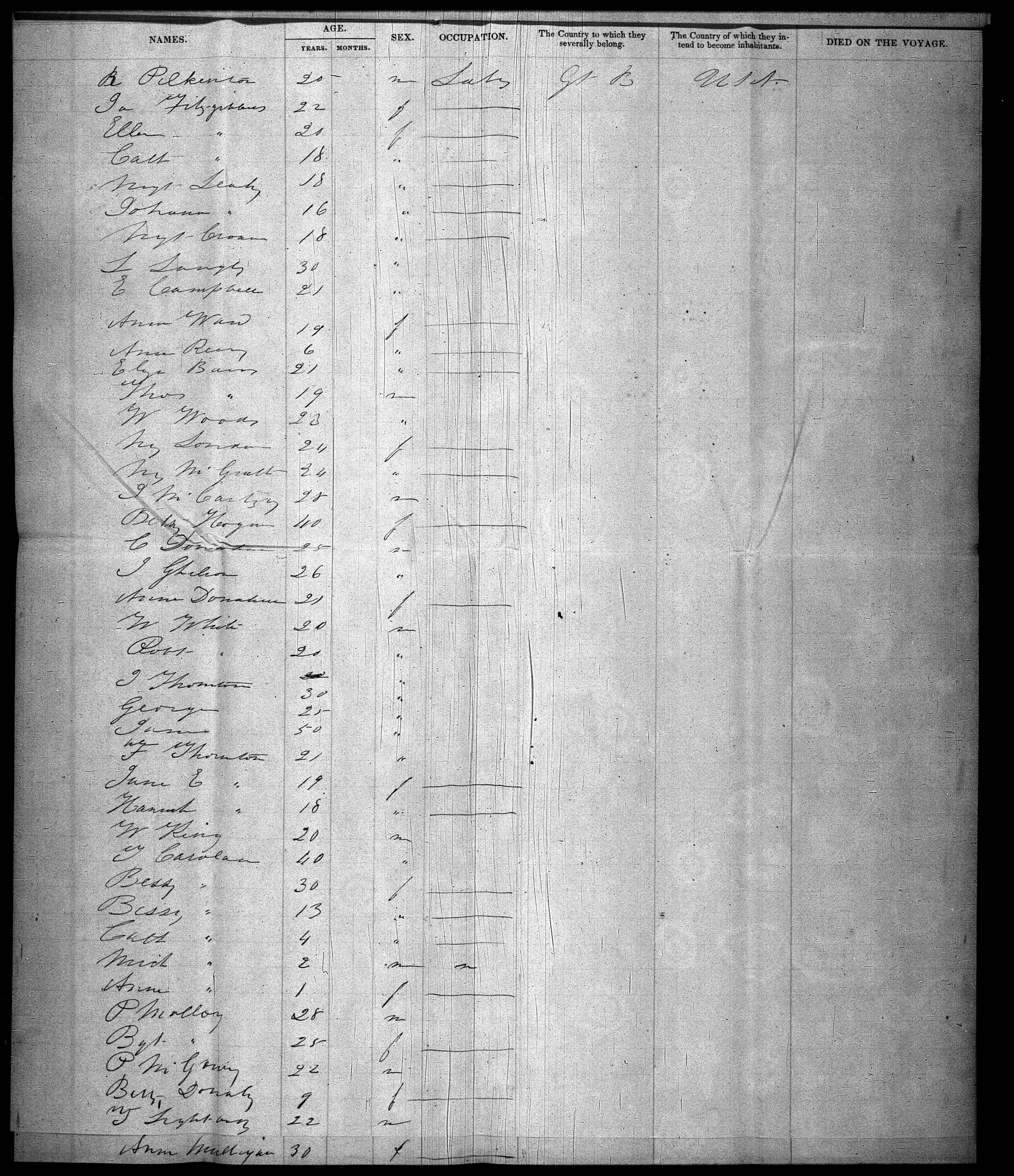
Manifest, page 7, "Patrick Henry," arrived New York City, Burling Slip, Grinnell, Minturn & Co., 78 South Street, July 27, 1847, as attested to by J.C. Delano, Capt. Image depicts "T. (Thomas) Carolan family

On July 27, 1847, the Patrick Henry commanded by Captain Joseph Delano arrived in New York with eighteen cabin passengers and 300 steerage passengers (no documented deaths) that included Michael Carolan (1844–1906), his father Thomas (1806–1870) and mother Elizabeth (1817–1875), and sisters Elizabeth, Catherine Bennett (1842-1908) and Annie (infant; died shortly after arrival). A 2021 essay on New England Public Media commemorated the crossing. The Carolans left their ancestral home in Light Town, parts of which are in the townlands of Drumbaragh and Balrath Demesne, on the border with Springville/Dandlestown, Civil Parish of Burry, which is three miles southwest of Kells. The population in Drumbaragh during an Gorta Mór plummeted 67 percent; in Springville, 54 percent, where there were fifty houses in 1841 and only eleven left in 1871. The family settled in Willow Grove, outside of Philadelphia, where six more children were born including Julia Ann Carolan Haughey (1849-1905), Thomas Spencer Carolan (1852–1915), Martha W. Carolan Guppy (1852-1929), Anna Elizabeth Carolan (1858-1930), Lydia Tyson Carolan Magargal (1862-1896) and Mary Emma Carolan Winder (1865-1927). The eldest son Michael moved to Fitzwatertown, Rowlandville and Franklinville.

According to IrishCentral, a namesake and descendant from the U.S. returned to the ancestral home in 2020.

=== Owner passage ===
The following May (1848), Captain Joseph Delano hosted shipowner Robert Minturn, his wife, sister-in-law, six children and servants on a voyage to England. "[The Patrick Henry] was one of the vessels which had so often before carried invalids, or tired clergymen, or young men broken down by study, sent by Mr. Minturn to recruit their strength by a voyage," a family member wrote in an hagiography published privately after his death. "He had so frequently done these kindnesses, that the application for them at last became incessant. Sometimes it was for an individual, sometimes for a family of foreigners, who had come to America in search of what they did not find — a living — and were most thankful to be sent back to their homes across the Atlantic." The Minturns took an eighteen-month tour of England, France, Italy, Switzerland, Germany, Jerusalem and Egypt that was said to have inspired plans that led to the creation of New York's Central Park.

In England, Minturn met the poet William Wordsworth and Lord Palmerston, who is remembered, among other endeavors, for evicting 2,000 tenants on his County Sligo estate and financing the cheapest passages possible on coffin ships to Canada on which many died or became sick and died later. Minturn went also to Scotland, from where he took the shortest route to Portrush in Northern Ireland, the country whose refugees of an Gorta Mór had made him, in today's currency, a billionaire. He visited the Giant's Causeway, which "excited his imagination." He promptly went on to France.

That fall, Captain John Delano (brother of Joseph) sailed the Patrick Henry from Liverpool to New York with twenty expelled Catholic priests from Rome, including Pietro Angelo Secchi (1818–1878), the Italian Jesuit priest and astrophysicist who made the first survey of the spectra of stars and suggested that stars be classified according to their spectral type.

=== At quarantine ===
On August 8, 1849, the Patrick Henry landed at New York and reported seven cabin passengers and 278 steerage passengers. The New York papers did not mention that seven people died on the 46-day passage nor that fever had broken out nor that the ship may have quarantined at the New York Marine Hospital on Staten Island, site of the later Staten Island Quarantine War. Minister and publisher Joseph Barker and a reporter, aboard the ship Hartford, which landed in New York after a 53-day passage, reported that 17 passengers aboard the Patrick Henry had died on the journey and the ship "had, in consequence, to remain some time in quarantine." He wrote that many of the passengers aboard the Hartford, including himself, had "regretted" not sailing on the Patrick Henry.

"It is not unlikely that several of those who regretted so much that they had not gone by the Patrick Henry, would have fallen victims to the disease that prevailed on board, if they had gone by her. How true it is, as I have said, that men often covet things which, if they obtained them, would prove their death, and repine at things which, if they understood them properly, they would see to be their life and salvation."

The dead reported on the ship manifest include Mr. & Mrs. Hackett, age 30, with their children Mary, 6, Glen, 4, Patrick, 3, and Mick, infant, as surviving; Ann Corcoran, wife of Peter, mother of Francis, both drapers; Elizabeth Peet, age 50; Corus McGillicuddy, age 9, son of Corus and Elizabeth; Francis Orme, 23, carpenter; and James Kelly, 35, no occupation. It was Capt. Joseph Delano's final voyage on the Patrick Henry.

=== Rough crossings ===
By 1851, J.E. Mulland was listed captain and on November 3, he arrived in New York (from London) with 374 passengers, 14 first-class and 360 steerage, with seven dead. It was his last voyage commanding the PH.

In early 1853, the Patrick Henry's Seaman Matthew Barnabb and Seamen Louis Barroch were drowned on January 18, during an unseasonably harsh Atlantic winter that had begun the previous fall. The ship, on its London to New York run, was hove to and "struck by a sea which carried away the bowsprit and the knight heads and all the rigging attached." Barnabb was swept off the ship, and a few hours later, Barroch was clearing away the wrecked bowsprit when he fell overboard and drowned. A third crewmember, William Wallace, fell from the fore yard and was injured severely. "It was blowing a gale at the time," reported Captain John Hurlbut, who brought her to port February 4, after a 40-day passage. "And impossible to save them."

That same month, January, the famous British steamer City of Glasgow, headed from Liverpool to Philadelphia, disappeared at sea with 480 passengers and crew. The packet-ship Rosicus was 51 days making the crossing; the Mary Annah 88 days, and the Celestial Empire took 60 days, with the loss of a seaman and ten passengers. A few months later (April), the American packet Powhattan ran aground off Harvey Cedars on Long Beach Island, New Jersey—today remembered as one of the State's shipwrecks with the greatest loss of life—between 200 and 365. The losses of the season were kicked off the previous September (1853), when the notable British steamer SS Arctic went down after a wreck in the fog, taking 315 lives. Then in December, the American clipper Staffordshire was on the return leg of a stormy transatlantic crossing and ran aground and sank off Nova Scotia, taking 170 of her 214 passengers and crew with her.

On another run of the Patrick Henry later that year (October), Capt. Hurlbut disembarked at New York after possibly transporting the most passengers the packet-ship ever saw on a single voyage: 403. He was in violation of the immigration law of one passenger per three tons of weight. Eleven passengers died at sea.

== Commerce and journalism ==
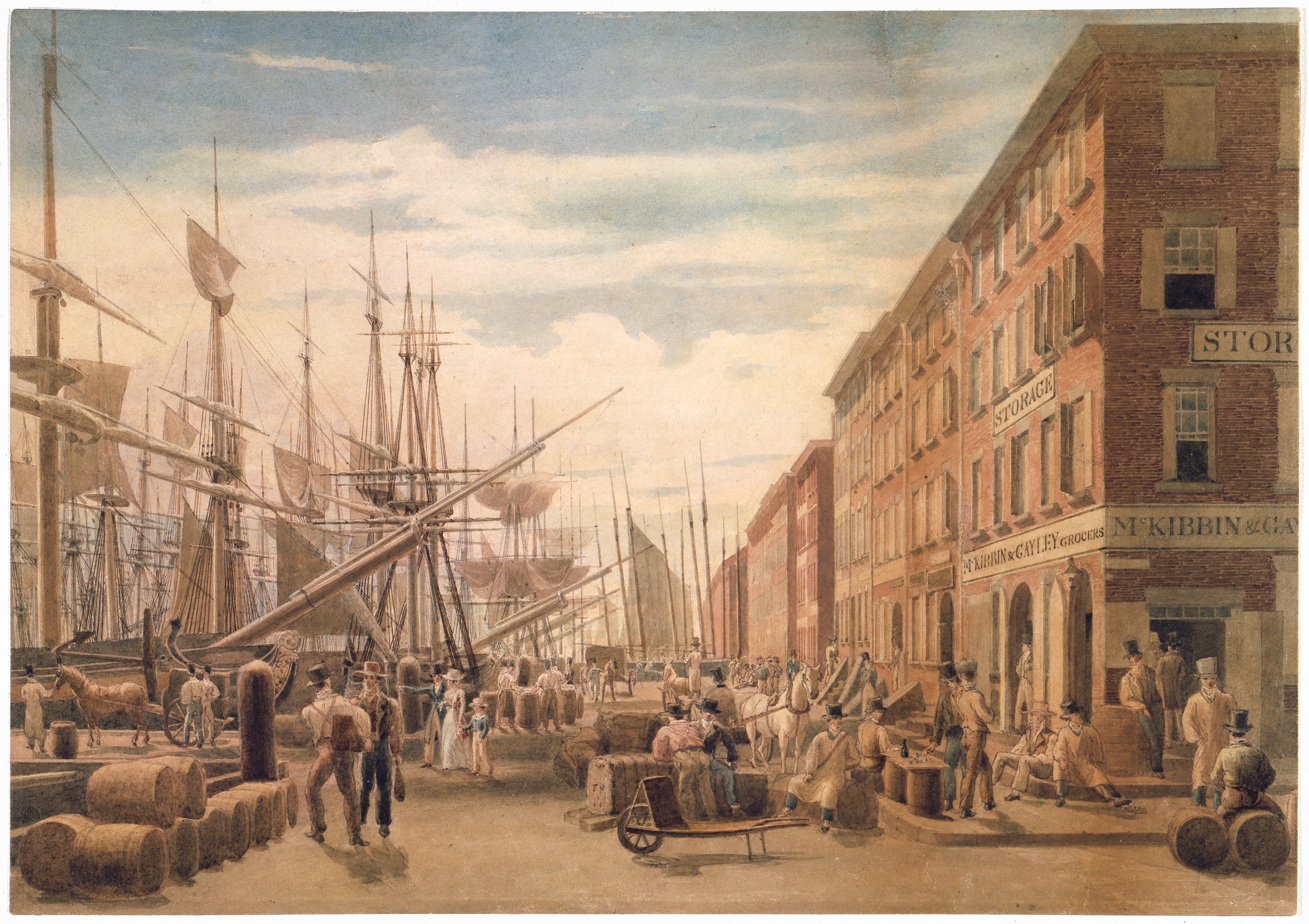
View of South Street, from Maiden Lane, where Patrick Henry (packet) docked

Receiving information as quickly as possible—whether regarding particulars about trade, foreign markets, decision-making, professional partnerships, business documents, legal contracts, personal letters and political, government and military news—was of urgent importance to 19th-century commerce. Industry and business made special arrangements to beat their competitors so that sailing ships, especially packet ships involved in the packet trade, emerged as the central information superhighway of the era, and for the development of journalism as well.

For instance, in late January 1840, the Patrick Henry arrived ahead of schedule and beat the competition to deliver the news from the continent for eager American readers. The Morning Herald (New York), February 1, on the front page, reported: "The foreign news given today is highly important. Yesterday afternoon, about half past three, we received it at this office being a full hour before any of the Wall street papers had their's — and by five oclock we issued an Extra, to gratify the immense crowd that surrounded our office. One of our clippers left town at 10 o'clock, and boarded the PH outside the bar at about one o'clock." The news was advertised as "Ten Days Later From England—-Highly Important" and included articles about war preparations by Russia, Queen Victoria's marriage that month, meeting of Parliament and the French Chamber, and the French King's speech.

"By the arrival of the Patrick Henry, Captain Delano, we have received immense files of English papers and periodicals, due to the 25th London, 26th from Liverpool and 23rd from Paris...Neither the Cambridge nor the Independence had arrived out on the 26th of Dec. The Patrick Henry had a fine run of nine days to the long(itude) of 38, where she took, on the 4th inst, strong westerly gales, which prevailed since that time without change."

Improvements in the speed of that communication was crucial for many commercial, financial and shipping business activities—speedier information made capital move faster, directly affecting world trade. In 1840, the Patrick Henry was among twenty sailing packet ships on the New York-Liverpool run, and notably among the speediest. The short round trips, however, did not depend on speed, but rather changes in the schedule. Efficiency may have been improved by tightening schedules, but this may have exacerbated delays and errors of judgment. For westbound sailings, there was a high risk of disaster. Nearly one packet in six was totally lost in service. This means that out of 6,000 crossings, about 22 ended in such wrecks. More than 600 British ships, of all types, were lost each year in between 1833 and 1835 and 1841 and 1842. The loss of lives varied between 1,450 and 1,560.

By the time of the maiden voyage of the Patrick Henry, in 1839, packet captains had begun taking more risks against their competitors as steamships were coming into service. Indeed, most shipwrecks took place during the period when the competition between sail and steam was hardest. From a mail, business and journalism transmission point of view, the trend was most alarming.

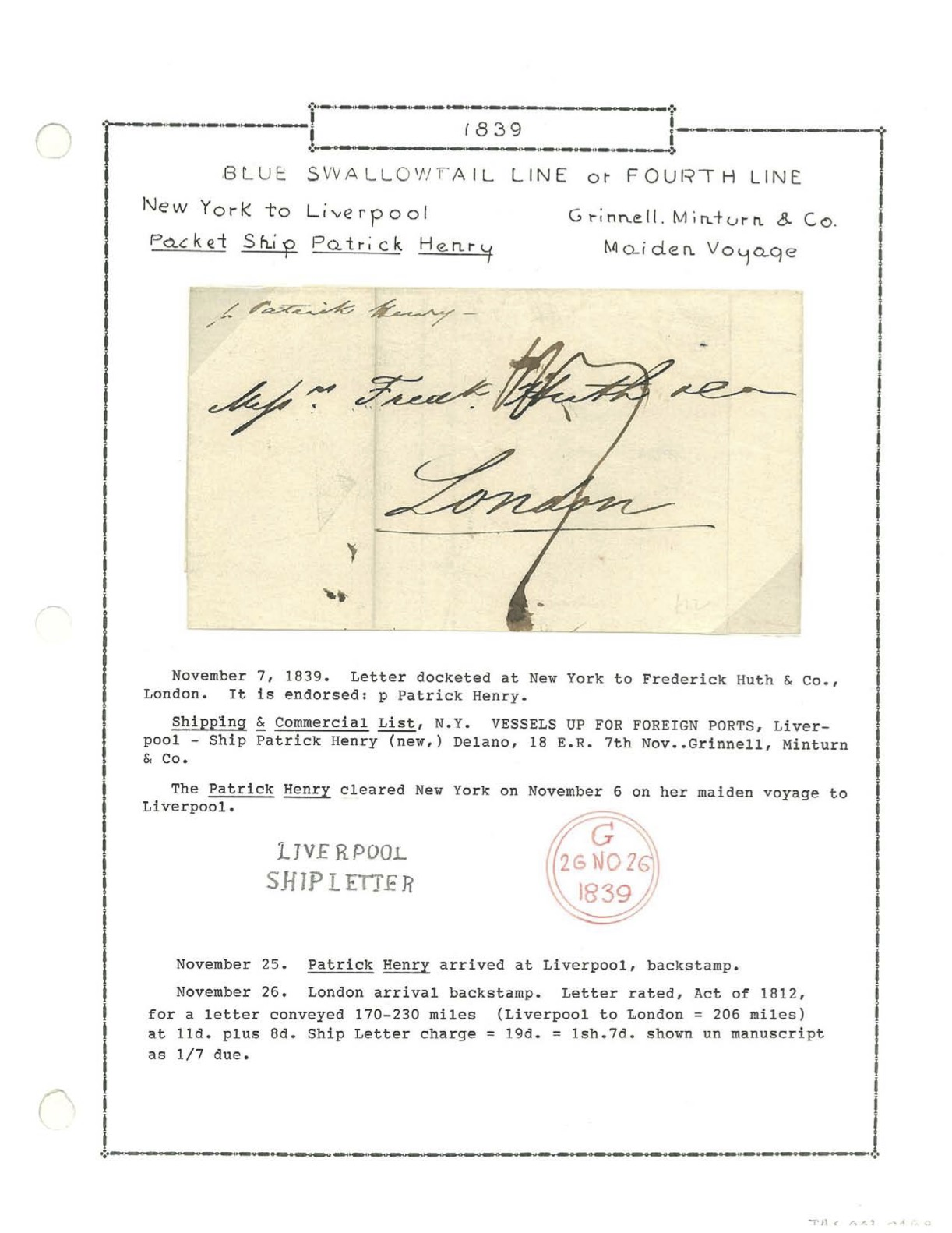
Display of letter on board her maiden voyage to England

"Between 1838 and 1847 no less than 21 mail-carrying ships were lost on the North Atlantic route – two each year on average. Two of the ships were Falmouth packets and two were steamers, while 17 were American sailing packets. Eight were on the New York–Liverpool route, two on the Boston–Liverpool route, two on the New York–London route, and five on the New York–Havre route. Six of the ships just disappeared, and were lost with all hands. It is notable that two out of every three wrecks took place in November–February, indicating that the packet captains took too heavy risks, especially during the rough winter sailings. The only precautionary measure to ensure solid business information transmission across the Atlantic was to send duplicates. This was very typical during the shift period. The duplicates also ensured the fastest possible dispatch of information."

Most mail – especially eastwards – was still carried by sailing ships during the first decade after the advent of the transatlantic steamship service. Even if the size of the sailing packets grew markedly, their service speed did not follow the trend after the introduction of steamships on the route in the late 1830s. After 1835, there seems to be no signs of speed improvements.

"Another phenomenon which indicates that the sailing packets were losing their hold on the first class business – mail, fine freight and cabin passengers – was that they no longer cared about the punctuality of the sailing dates as much as they did in the 1830s. If the reliability of a mail ship service is measured by the regularity of sailings and the safety records, the performance of the American sailing packets in the mid-1840s was noticeably below such expectations."

== Final days ==
In 1860, Captain William B. Moore is listed master, and in 1864, after a quarter century of service, the Patrick Henry was "sold British" at Londonderry, due to the Civil War, to J.P. Allen & Co., Naval and Military Tailors, Londonderry. Her final voyage, with passengers, may have begun on June 26, 1871, when she left port at Pensacola, Florida, and sailed to Liverpool, arriving August 19.

Lloyd's Register of Shipping for 1868/69 lists her as registered at Cork with measurements: 837/854/773 tons (net/gross/under deck); 159.3 × 35.8 × 21.6 ft; forecastle 21 ft, poop 41 ft. Originally rigged as a ship, in 1869–70 she was re-rigged as a bark and likely put into service as a timber transport between England and Canada—similar to the Flying Cloud, which became "just one of many prosaic vessels that tramped around the world looking for freight." The Patrick Henry was twelve years older than the Flying Cloud and lasted nearly a decade beyond her. In June 1875, townspeople bearing torches burned the broken-backed Cloud in the harbor of Saint John, New Brunswick, Canada. The Patrick Henry herself was surveyed the following year, at Quebec, in June 1876. Between 1876 and 1882, T.E. Sargent was her captain. Her final survey was in March 1877. The 1881/82 volume of Lloyd's Register lists her but her rating had expired.

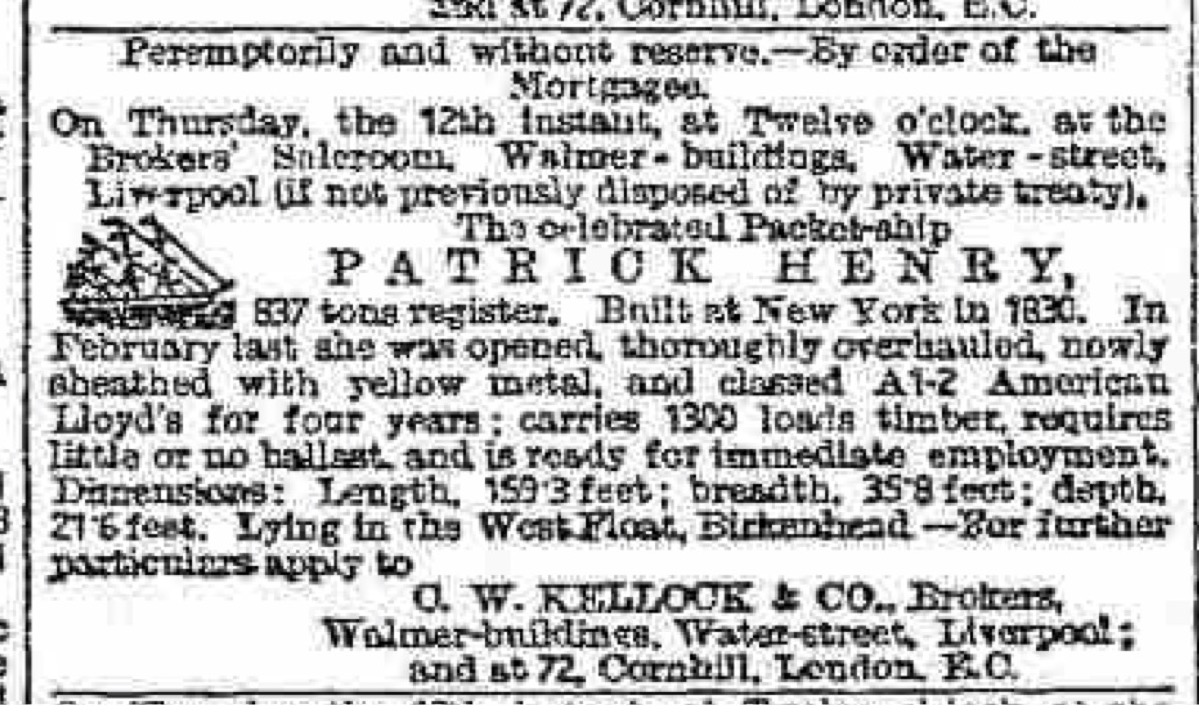
Patrick Henry (packet) advertised for purchase in the July 3, 1884, issue of the Liverpool Mercury. She was broken up the following year.

On September 12, 1882, the Patrick Henry was moving into the Fleetwood harbor, off the Lancashire coast of England. There were two other vessels that had run aground and the channel was very narrow, kept open by dredging the natural course of the River Wyre.

By the time she dropped anchor, she had run ashore on the Cansh bank. The Liverpool tug, Fury from Holyhead, was unable to pull her off. She "broke her back and sustained such injuries that the cost of repairing her would be greater than she was worth." A lawsuit ensued against the harbormaster for the loss of the Patrick Henry after he gave the order to drop anchor, but a jury found in the harbormaster's favor in February 1883.

A few months later, she was lying in the port where, 44 years earlier, at Waterloo Dock, she began transporting thousands of people to New York. She had been "thoroughly overhauled" for "1,300 loads of timber," and was for sale, with dimensions 169.3 feet length x 35.8 feet breadth x 21.6 feet depth. According to The American Neptune: A Quarterly Journal of Maritime History and Arts, she was broken up the following year (1884).

Her final owner, James Edwin Pim, was a timber merchant & shipowner and purchased the Patrick Henry in 1868. J.E. was son of one of the original Pim Brothers, a large Dublin Quaker family of business entrepreneurs, merchants, Irish poplin manufacturers and drapers. His cousin Jonathan Pim was a Member of Parliament (MP) for Dublin and served as secretary for the Quaker Relief fund during the an Gorta Mór and bought an estate in the west of Ireland for the purpose of benefiting the tenants. The Quakers (Society of Friends) are recognized as saving thousands of lives in Ireland by establishing the first soup kitchens and tirelessly working to distribute and donate food during the Great Hunger. Fittingly, Jonathan Pim corresponded directly with the New York relief committee concerning the 1847 shipments of food aboard the very Patrick Henry that his cousin, James Edwin, later purchased.

== In art ==
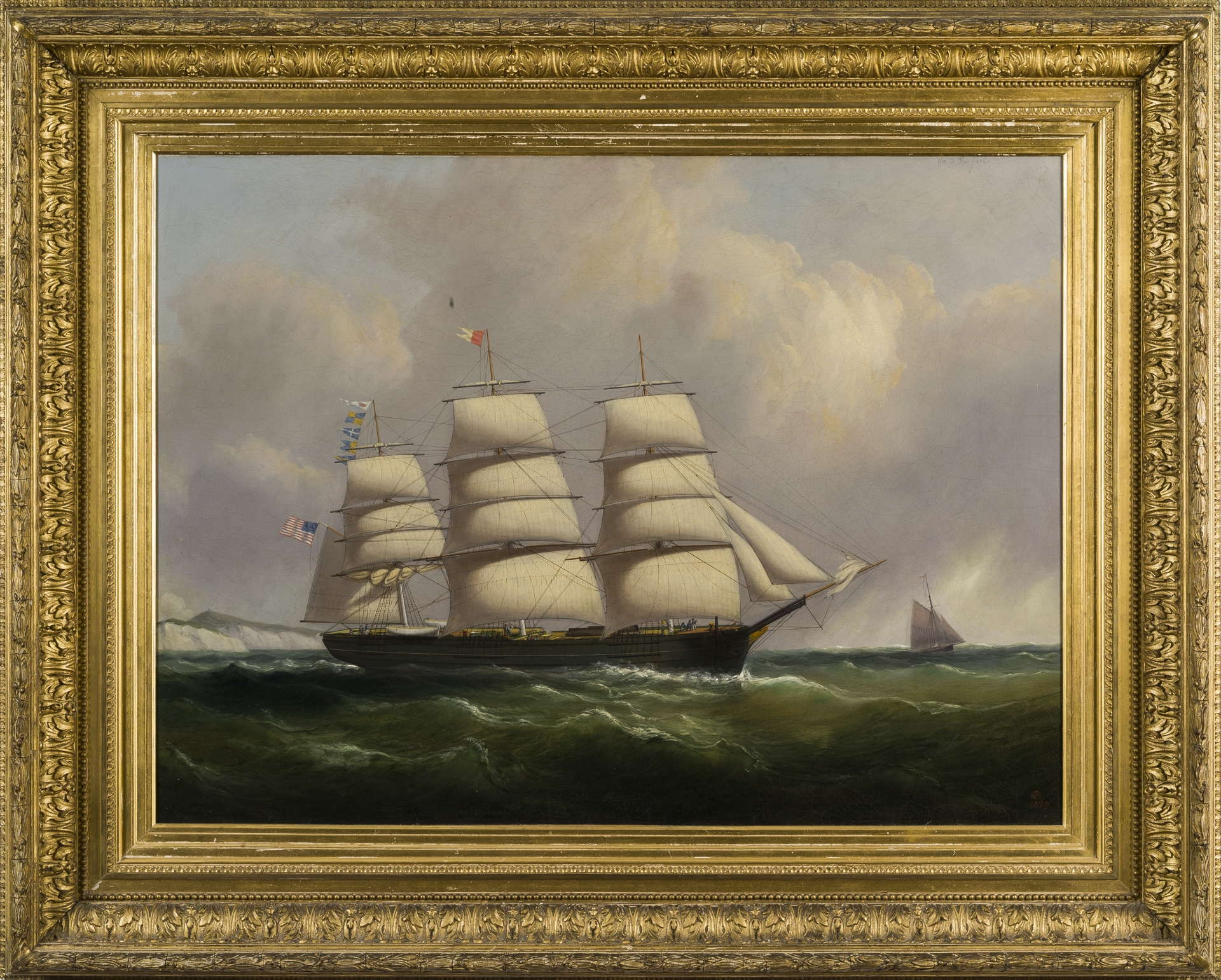
American Packet Ship "Patrick Henry" off the Cliffs of Dover, Philip John Ouless (British, 1817–1885), 1859, private collection

In 1858, Philip John Ouless (British, 1817–1885), a successful workmanlike painter of marine subjects, made preliminary sketches of the Patrick Henry and in 1859 completed, "The American Packet Ship "Patrick Henry" Off the Cliffs of Dover." Oil on canvas, 26 3/4 × 37 1/2 inches. Signed with the artist's monogram "PJO" and dated 1859, l.r. In a gilt period frame. In a private collection.

== In literature ==
The American packet ships of the early to mid-nineteenth century played a large role in the making of a nation, according to The Western Ocean Packets; by their "sheer virility and heroic energy," "superb strength of brain and muscle,” the "gallant, hard-sailed packets with their 'tween decks crowded with emigrants," became "one of the most, if not the most, important factor in this world's development along the lines of steady progress, whether moral or physical."

"The greatest days of the New York ships followed quickly upon the closing of the second war with England. Its shrewd, farsighted Quaker element saw the possibilities of packet service to Europe. Sailing on advertised dates, the ships grew in tonnage from year to year and made their owners rich. The usual method of division in New York was by partial ownership. An agent owned an eighth, a builder, to ensure his getting the repair work, which amounted to about five hundred dollars a round trip, owned another eighth. The captain might own an equal share and perhaps a sixteenth each was held by the block maker and the sailmaker. The rest of course was vested in the owner."

"The times required brave sailing. Sails were set at the piers. Crowds stood by and cheered the departures. The whole city became interested. Ships were even sailed right up to their berths and the seaman had every opportunity to satisfy his pride and exhibit his skill. The local delight in packet performance was well founded, for the whole country displayed interest. Competition was keen and yet the Dreadnought of New York was able to make a record and leave it standing untouched. Sailors called her "the wild boat of the Atlantic "and she had a song written about her and used it as a shanty. She once overhauled the Cunard steamer Canada which had left a day before her and was only able to dock in Boston at the same time that the Dreadnought reached New York. The Patrick Henry of one thousand tons was also a remarkably fine sailor, a favorite packet, and one that made more money for Grinnell, Minturn and Company than any other ship they owned...Shipping was coming into its own in the new days of peace and New York was booming."

=== Additional mentions in print ===
Albion, Robert Greenhalgh. Square-riggers on Schedule: The New York Sailing Packets to England, France, and the Cotton Ports. Princeton: Princeton University Press, 1938.

Bradlee, Francis Boardman Crowninshield. The Dreadnought of Newburyport, Massachusetts: And Some Account of the Old Transatlantic Packet-ships. United States, Essex Institute, 1920, p. 16. OCLC 14251210

Clark, Arthur H. The clipper ship era: An epitome of famous American and British clipper ships, their owners, builders, commanders, and crews, 1843–1869. New York: G.P. Putnam's sons, 1910.

Cutler Carl C. Queens Of The Western Ocean, The Story Of American's Mail And Passenger Sailing Lines Published by U.S. Naval Institute, 1961. ISBN 0-87021-531-0

Fairburn, William Armstrong. Merchant Sail. Volume 2. United States, Fairburn Marine Educational Foundation, 1945, p. 1164. 001350074

Ships and Shipping of Old New York: A Brief Account of the Interesting Phases of the Commerce of New York from the Foundation of the City to the Beginning of the Civil War. United States, Bank of Manhattan Company, 1915, p. 42. Internet archive.

Schroeder, Gustavus W.. Articles about Vessels of All Descriptions, Ancient and Modern. United States, n.p, 1850, p. 218, 221.

Staff, Frank. The Transatlantic Mail. United Kingdom, J. DeGraff, 1956, p. 123, 125.

Stonehouse, James. Pictorial Liverpool: Its Annals; Commerce; Shipping; Institutions; Public Buildings; Sights; Excursions; &c., &c: A New and Complete Hand-book for Resident, Visitor, and Tourist. United Kingdom, H. Lacey, 1844, p. 27
