= Odd Fellows (disambiguation) =

Odd Fellows or Oddfellows is an international fraternity and its members.

Odd Fellows may also refer to:

== Organisations ==
=== United Kingdom ===
- Order of Patriotic Oddfellows, formed in the mid-18th century in the south of England, favouring William III of England
- Ancient Order of Oddfellows, formed in the mid-18th century in northern England, favouring the House of Stuart
  - Grand United Order of Oddfellows, founded in 1798 by neutral amalgamation of Order of Patriotic Oddfellows and Ancient Order of Oddfellows
    - Independent Order of Oddfellows Manchester Unity, founded in 1810 in a break from the Grand United Order of Oddfellows

=== International ===
- Independent Order of Odd Fellows, originally chartered in 1819 in Baltimore, United States, by the Manchester Unity of Odd Fellows, independent since 1842
- Grand United Order of Odd Fellows in America, founded in 1843, principally including members of Afro-Americans and others of colour

== Cemeteries ==
- Odd Fellows Cemetery, in Burlington, NJ
- Odd Fellows Lawn Cemetery and Mausoleum, in Sacramento, CA
- IOOF Cemetery, in Hamilton, Texas
- Odd Fellows Cemetery, in Centralia, Pennsylvania

== Other uses ==
- Insignia Financial, formerly IOOF, originated as the Victoria Grand Lodge of the Independent Order of Odd Fellows, Australia
- Memorial to Pioneer Odd Fellows, a California Historical Landmark located near Carson Pass in Alpine County, California, United States
- Oddfellows (2013), an album by American rock group Tomahawk
- Oddfellows Cafe and Bar, a restaurant in Seattle, Washington, United States
