= Patrick H. Reason =

American engraver, lithographer and abolitionist

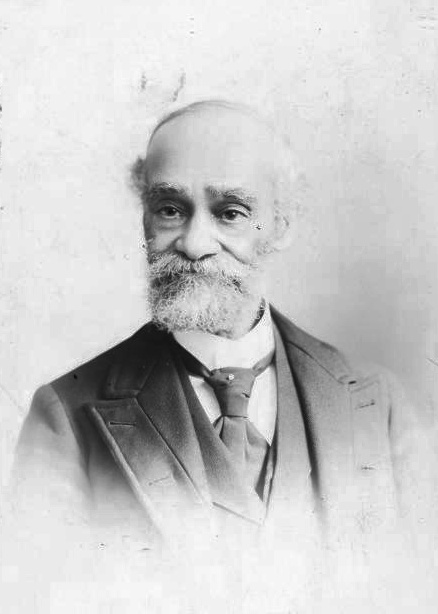
Studio portrait of Patrick H. Reason, c. 1890s

Patrick Henry Reason, first named Patrice Rison (March 17, 1816 – August 12, 1898), was one of the earliest African-American engravers and lithographers in the United States. He was active as an abolitionist (along with his brother Charles Lewis Reason). He was a leader in a fraternal order, gaining recognition for Hamilton Lodge No. 710, New York, as part of the Grand United Order of Odd Fellows in America.

== Early life and education ==
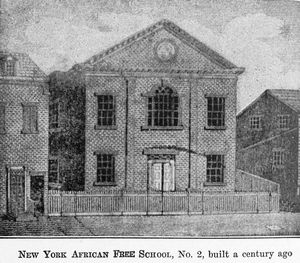
Reprint of Reason's drawing of African Free School No. 2

Reason was born in 1816 in New York City as one of four children. His father, Michel Rison, was native to St. Anne Island, Guadeloupe, and his mother, Elizabeth Melville, was native to Saint-Domingue, the former French colony that achieved independence as Haiti. He was baptized Patrice Rison in April 1816 at St. Peter's Catholic Church. His sister Policarpe died at age four in 1818.

With his two brothers Elver and Charles L. Reason, Patrick attended New York's African Free School. At the age of 13, his drawing of the school building was engraved for the frontispiece of Charles C. Andrews's history of the school published in 1830. He was apprenticed to Stephen Henry Gimber (1806–1862), an English engraver and lithographer in the city.

== Career ==
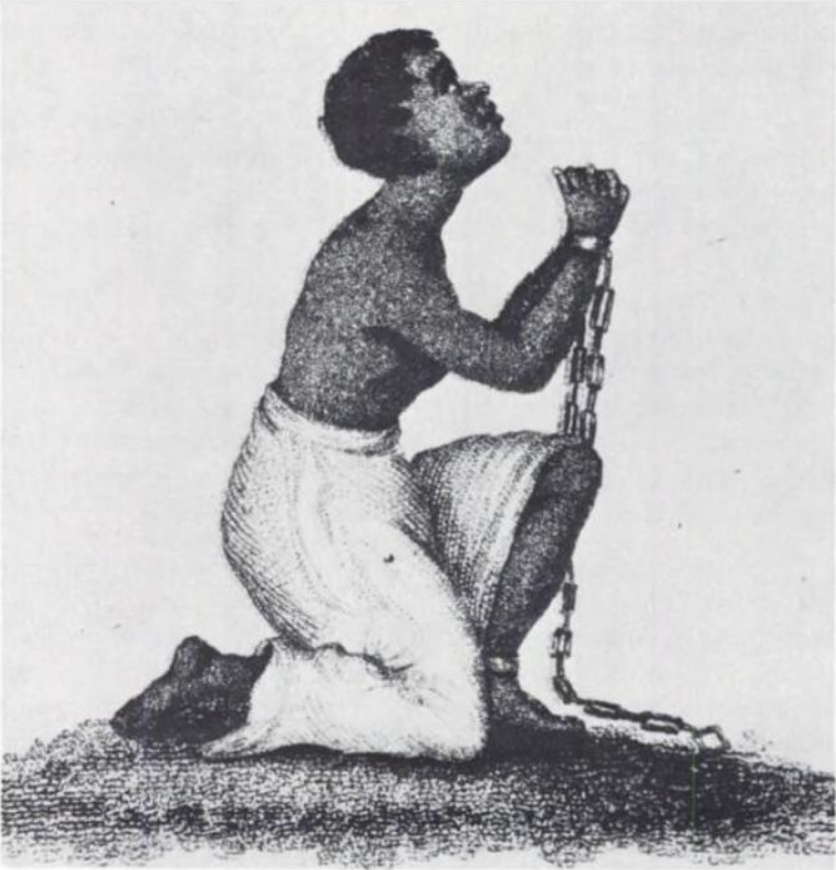
Engraving of a kneeling slave, 1835, Patrick H. Reason

Reason set up his own shop, where he engraved portraits and other images for anti-slavery and other books and journals, as well as for individuals. His engravings include an 1835 version of the kneeling female slave; an 1840 portrait of United States Senator Benjamin Tappan (R-Ohio); the frontispiece portrait for the 1849 autobiography of Henry Bibb, a fugitive from slavery who became an abolitionist lecturer; and the coffin plate of Daniel Webster. An 1840 lithograph portrait of Bibb has also been attributed to Reason.

As a member of the New York Philomathean Society, Reason and others petitioned but were refused inclusion in an American fraternal organization, the Independent Order of Odd Fellows. They were granted recognition from the British-based, Grand United Order of Oddfellows, and formed the Grand United Order of Odd Fellows in America. The first lodge was Philomathean Lodge, No. 646, soon followed by Hamilton Lodge, No. 710, also in New York. Reason designed the membership certificate, at one point served as the lodge's grand master, and in 1858 composed the Ruth degree, the first to be conferred upon female members and became the Household of Ruth.

In 1869, Reason moved with his family to Cleveland, Ohio. There he joined the firm of Sylvester Hogan, where he created jewelry and made plate engravings until his death in 1898.

== Marriage and family ==
In 1862, Reason married Esther Cunningham (1835–1920) of Leeds, England. Their son, Charles Lewis Reason (named for Patrick's brother), was born in 1867. He became a doctor and practiced medicine in Cleveland, Ohio. Charles Reason died a widower in Elyria, southwest of Cleveland. He had no descendants.

== Bibliography ==
- Note: Many biographical sketches include factual errors about Reason's life and work. The most reliable one was written by the archivist and collector Dorothy B. Porter:
- Porter, Dorothy B., "Patrick H. Reason", Dictionary of American Negro Biography, edited by Rayford W. Logan and Michael R. Winston, 1982.
