= Odd Fellows =

Fraternal service movement

- Triple links, a recurring symbol among Odd Fellows internationally
- Founded: 1730; 296 years ago London, England
- Type: Fraternal order
- Affiliation: Independent
- Status: Active
- Scope: International
- Motto: Amicitia Amor et Veritas "Friendship, Love & Truth"
- Headquarters: United Kingdom and United States

Odd Fellows (or Oddfellows when referencing the Grand United Order of Oddfellows or some British-based fraternities; also Odd Fellowship or Oddfellowship) is an international fraternity consisting of lodges first documented in 1730 in London. Odd Fellows promote philanthropy, the ethic of reciprocity, and charity; some grand lodges imply a Judeo-Christian affiliation. The American-based Independent Order of Odd Fellows enrolls some 600,000 members divided into approximately 10,000 lodges in thirty countries, and is interfraternally recognised by the British-based Independent Order of Oddfellows Manchester Unity. In total, members of all international branches combined are estimated in the millions worldwide.

The first known lodge was called Loyal Aristarcus Lodge No. 9, suggesting there were earlier ones in the 18th century. Notwithstanding, convivial meetings were held "in much revelry and, often as not, the calling of the Watch to restore order." Names of several British pubs today suggest past Odd Fellows affiliations. In the mid-18th century, following the Jacobite risings, the fraternity split into the rivaling Order of Patriotic Oddfellows in southern England, favouring William III of England, and the Ancient Order of Oddfellows in northern England and Scotland, favouring the House of Stuart.

Odd Fellows from that time include John Wilkes (1725–1797) and Sir George Savile, 8th Baronet of Thornton (1726–1784), advocating civil liberties and reliefs, including Catholic emancipation. Political repressions, such as the Unlawful Oaths Act (1797) and the Unlawful Societies Act (1799), resulted in neutral amalgamation of the Grand United Order of Oddfellows in 1798. Since then, the fraternity has remained religiously and politically independent. George IV of the United Kingdom, admitted in 1780 while he was Prince of Wales, was the first documented of many Odd Fellows to also attend freemasonry, although the societies remain mutually independent.

In 1810, further instigations led to the establishment of the Independent Order of Oddfellows Manchester Unity in England. Odd Fellows spread overseas, including formally chartering the fraternity in the United States in 1819. In 1842, due to British authorities intervening in the customs and ceremonies of British Odd Fellows and in light of post-colonial American sovereignty, the American Odd Fellows became independent as the Independent Order of Odd Fellows (always written as Odd Fellows, not Oddfellows like other orders) under British-American Thomas Wildey (1782–1861), soon constituting the largest sovereign grand lodge. The Daughters of Rebekah, now known as the International Association of Rebekah Assemblies, was established in 1851 as a women's auxiliary organization to the Independent Order of Odd Fellows. Likewise, by the mid-19th century, the Independent Order of Oddfellows Manchester Unity had become the largest and richest fraternal organisation in the United Kingdom.

In 1843, rejected from the Independent Order of Odd Fellows due to race, Peter Ogden petitioned the Grand United Order of Oddfellows for a charter and was granted it forming the Philomathean Lodge, No. 646, in New York City. The women's auxiliary organization, Household of Ruth, was established in 1858.

== Name ==
Several theories aim to explain the etymological background of the name "Odd Fellows," often rendered "Oddfellows" in British English. In 18th-century United Kingdom, major trades were organised in guilds or other forms of syndicates, but smaller trades did not have equivalent social or financial security. One theory has it that "odd fellows", people who exercised unusual, miscellaneous "odd trades", eventually joined together to form a larger group of "odd fellows."

Another theory suggests that in the beginning of odd fellowship in the 18th century, at the time of the early era of industrialisation, it was rather odd to find people who followed noble values such as fraternalism, benevolence, and charity. The name was supposedly adopted at a time when the severance into sects and classes was so wide that persons aiming at social union and mutual help were a marked exception to the general rule. Possibly, it met a mixed reaction from the upper classes, who may have seen them as a source of revenue by taxes, but also as a threat to their authority.

Any suggestion of history before the 18th century is considered mere speculation.

== History ==
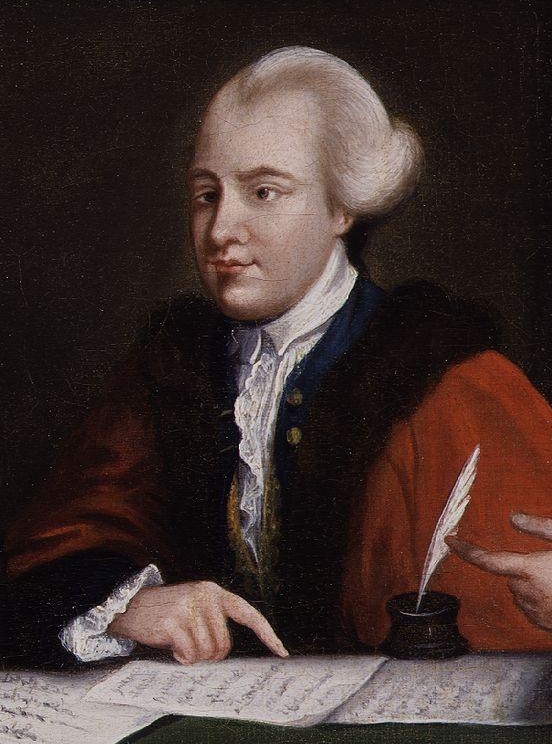
John Wilkes (1725–1797), initially a young radical journalist, then gradually more conservative; one of the first documented Odd Fellows.

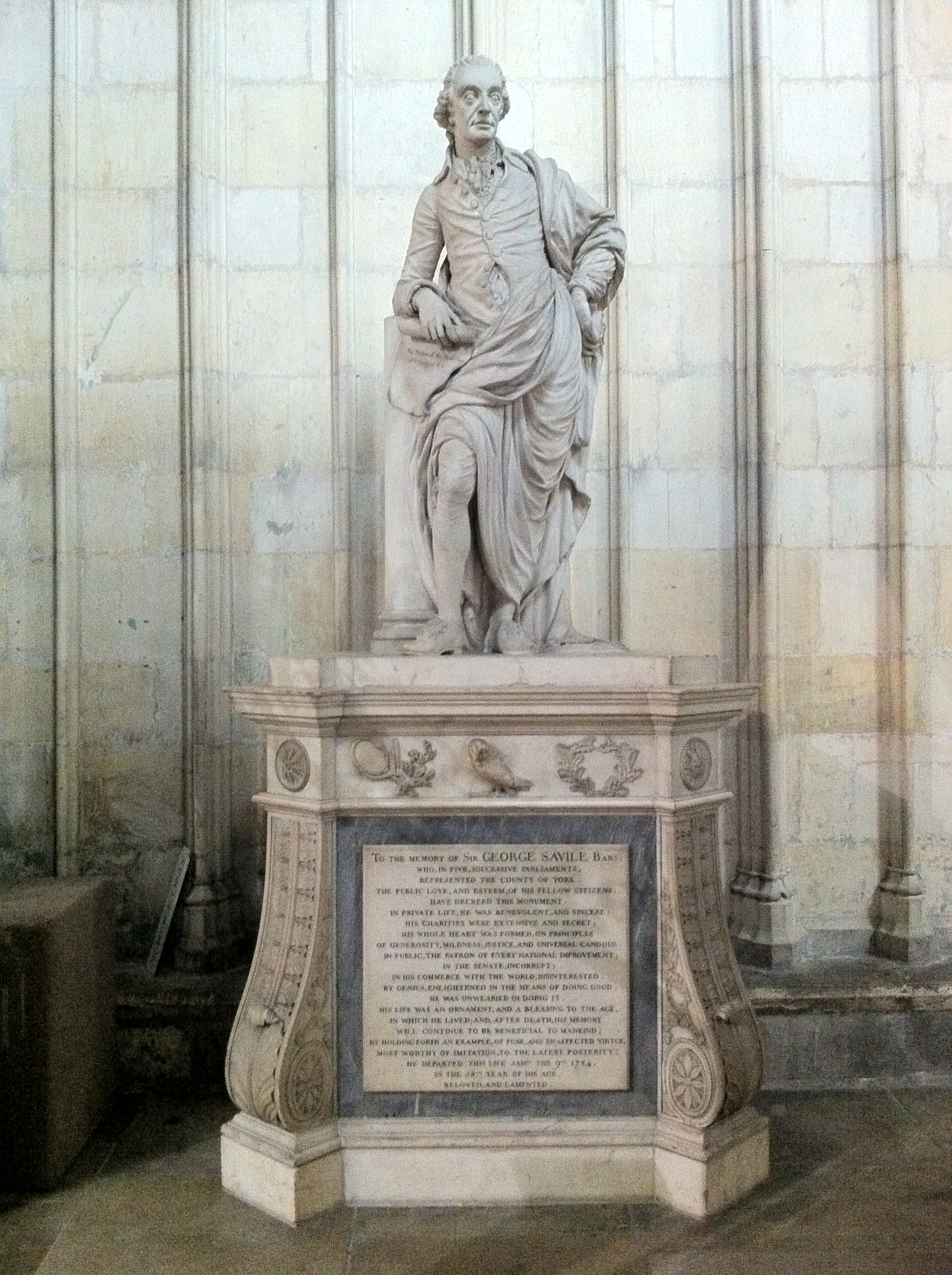
Sir George Savile, 8th Baronet (1726–1784), an Odd Fellow who famously advocated civil liberties and reliefs in the United Kingdom, including Catholic emancipation. Subsequently, the Odd Fellows became religiously and politically independent.

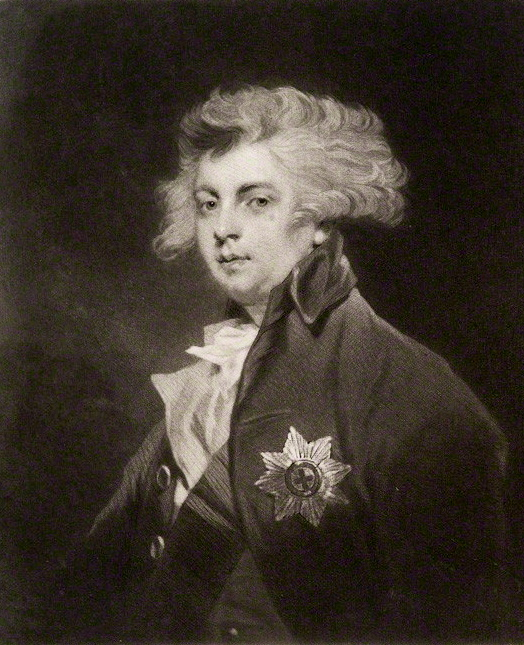
Prince George the Prince of Wales, later King George IV of the United Kingdom (1762–1830), admitted in 1780, was the first documented of many odd fellows to also adhere to freemasonry; both societies remained mutually independent.

=== Background ===
The Odd Fellows are one of the earliest and oldest fraternal societies, but their early history is obscure and largely undocumented.

Traditions tracing the fraternity's origins back to Roman emperors Nero and Titus are considered dubious. The evolution of the society from medieval guilds, however, is more reliably documented. (Note: Both History of the Oddfellows and The Oddfellows Over the Years describe the evolution of the Guilds, and Oddfellow terminology derived from the guilds. For example, each Guild was headed by a Grand Master, the name that the Odd Fellows use to refer to their annually elected Head.)

By the 13th century, tradesmen's guilds had become established and prosperous. During the 14th century, guild masters moved to protect their power and wealth by restricting access to the guilds. In response, the less experienced and less wealthy fellows established their rival guilds. (Note: History of the Oddfellows: The "Master" required that guild members wear expensive uniforms and jewellery to meetings; as the less wealthy "Fellows" could not afford these, they were thus precluded from membership. Lodge "collars" and "jewels" have their origins in this guild-masters' "restrictive trade practice".)^{,}^{,}

When Henry VIII broke with the Roman Catholic Church, he viewed the guilds as supporting the pope, and in 1545 he confiscated all material property of the guilds. Elizabeth I stripped the guilds of the responsibility for training apprentices, and by the end of her reign, most guilds had been suppressed.

The exact origin of Oddfellowship is involved in obscurity. It must have had a beginning, but just when and where, no historian has ever been able to ascertain. All of its history before the introduction of the Order into England is merely conjecture founded upon proofless, and, in most cases, absurd traditions.

— "History" page of the Grand United Order of Odd Fellows in America

Great antiquity has been claimed for the order ... Oddfellows themselves, however, now generally admit that the institution cannot be traced back beyond the first half of the 18th century.

— Encyclopædia Britannica (1911)

=== Foundation ===
There were numerous Oddfellow organizations in England in the 1700s. One Edwardian Oddfellow history argued that in 1710 there was a 'Loyal Lintot of Oddfellows' in London. The first Oddfellows group in South Yorkshire, England, dates from 1730. The earliest surviving documented evidence of an “Oddfellows” lodge is the minutes of Loyal Aristarchus Oddfellow Lodge no. 9 in England, dated 12 March 1748. By it being lodge number 9, this connotes that there were older Oddfellows lodges that existed before this date.

After the failure of Bonnie Prince Charlie's uprising in 1745, in 1789, these two Orders formed a partial amalgamation as the Grand United Order of Oddfellows. These days they are more commonly known as "The Grand United Order of Oddfellows Friendly Society" (GUOOFS), abandoning all political and religious disputes and committing itself to promoting the harmony and welfare of its members. Some books mention that there was a lodge of the 'Union Order of Oddfellows' in London in 1750, and one in Derby in 1775.

The Oddfellows Magazine of 1888 included a picture of a medal presented to the secretary of a lodge of the Grand Independent Order of Oddfellows in 1796. In a magazine review of a 1798 sermon preached in the Sheffield Parish Church, the "Oddfellows appear to be very numerous with about thirty-nine lodges of them in London and its vicinity, two at Sheffield, and one at each of the following places: Wolverhampton, Birmingham, Shrewsbury, Windsor, Wandsworth, Canterbury, Liverpool, Richmond in Surrey and Lewes". This suggested that the "Original United Order of Oddfellows" consisted of a total of 50 lodges at that time.

In 1810, various lodges of the Union or United Order in the Manchester area declared themselves as an "Independent Order", and organized the "Manchester Unity of Oddfellows", which chartered the Odd Fellows in North America in 1819.

=== International evolution ===
==== United Kingdom ====
- 1748: Earliest surviving records of an oddfellows lodge is the manuscript of the rules, dated 1748, of the Loyal Aristarcus Lodge No. 9 which met in the Oakley Arms in Southwark, the Globe Tavern in Hatton Garden and the Boar's Head in Smithfield, London.
- mid-18th century: Order of Patriotic Oddfellows
- mid-18th century: Ancient Order of Oddfellows
- 1798: Grand United Order of Oddfellows (Note: The Grand United Order of Oddfellows are now more commonly referred to as The Grand United Order of Oddfellows Friendly Society (GUOOFS)) (Note: The Grand United Order of Oddfellows, established in England in 1798, should not be confused with the Grand United Order of Odd Fellows, established in the USA in 1843.)
- 1810: The Independent Order – Manchester Unity (Note: The Manchester Unity of Oddfellows is also known as The Independent Order of Oddfellows Manchester Unity Friendly Society)
- 1810: Nottingham Ancient Imperial Order of Oddfellows
- 1820: Improved Independent Order of Oddfellows (South London)
- 1827: Caledonian Lodge of Oddfellows, based in Newburgh, Fife, is the only lodge of Oddfellows left in Scotland
- 1832: Ancient and Noble (Bolton Unity) split from the Grand United Order in 1832, dissolved in 1962
- 1832: Ancient National Order of Oddfellows (Bolton)
- 1832: Nottingham Odd Fellows, split from the Manchester Unity in 1832.
- 1834: Leeds United Order of Oddfellows
- 1840: Independent Order of Oddfellows (Kingston)
- 1845: National Independent Order of Oddfellows
- 1849: Independent Order of Oddfellows (Norfolk & Norwich Unity)
- 1850: Independent Order of Oddfellows Manchester Unity Friendly Society
- 1853: Improved Independent Order of Oddfellows (London)
- 1858: Free and Independent Order of Oddfellows
- 1861: Ancient Independent Order of Oddfellows (Kent)
- 1867: British United Order of Oddfellows
- 1883: Scottish Order of Oddfellows
- 1900: National Independent Order of Oddfellows
- 1910: Caledonian Order of United Oddfellows

===== Other =====
- Ancient and Noble Order of United Oddfellows
- Independent Order of Oddfellows Bolton Unity Friendly Society
- Independent Order of Oddfellows Kingston Unity Friendly Society
- Independent Order of Oddlittlefellows Madison Unity Friendly Society

==== United States ====
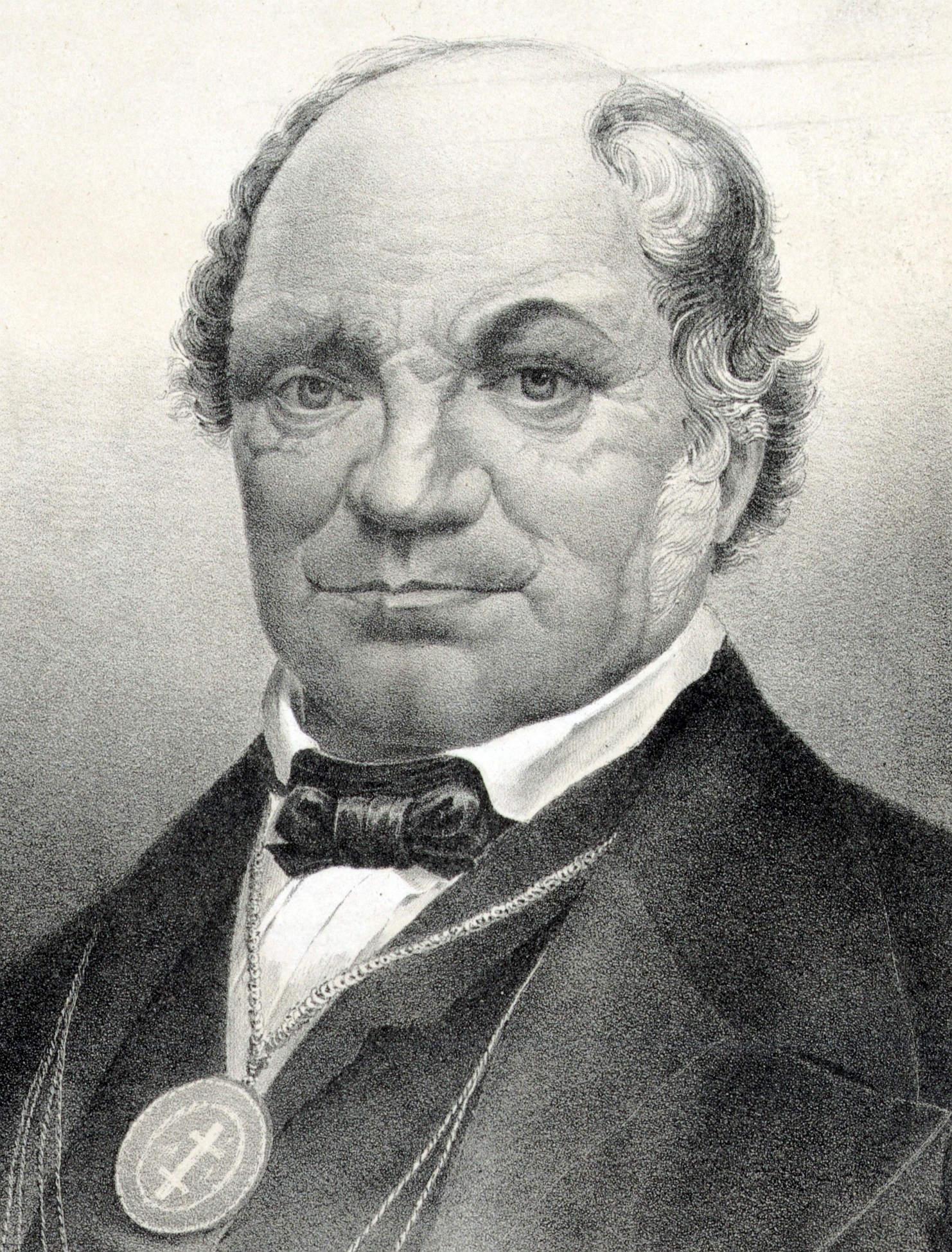
British-American Thomas Wildey (1782–1861) founded the Washington Lodge No 1 in Baltimore in 1819, subsequently the Independent Order of Odd Fellows since 1842.

- 1819: Independent Order of Odd Fellows (IOOF) formed in 1819 in Baltimore by Thomas Wildey, chartered by the British Manchester Unity, separated in 1842, today with lodges in approximately 29 countries.
- 1843: The American Grand United Order of Odd Fellows (GUOOF) formed in 1843, receiving its charter from the British Grand United Order of Oddfellows (rather than the American IOOF).

== Catholic opposition ==
The Catholic Church in the 19th and early 20th centuries condemned secretive societies such as the Freemasons, deemed "pseudo-religious", but also addressed other organisations, including expressing suspicions against the stated religious neutrality and independence of Oddfellows.

In 1907, the Apostolic Delegate to the United States, the Most Rev. Diomede Falconio, in reply to a query from the Rev. Novatus Benzing, OFM, of Phoenix, Arizona, determined that the Daughters of Rebekah, the auxiliary of the Independent Order of Odd Fellows, as well as the female auxiliaries of other condemned secret societies, fell under the same category of condemnation.

However, permission for "passive membership" in female groups affiliated with societies condemned by the church in 1894 (including the Knights of Pythias and Sons of Temperance) could be granted individually under certain conditions, viz. that the person in question had joined the group in good faith before the condemnation, that leaving the group would cause financial hardship due to the loss of sick benefits and insurance, that if permission is granted dues would only be paid by mail, the parishioner would not attend any lodge meetings, and the society would not have anything to do with the person's funeral.

Since 1975, however, several Catholic priests have become members of the Odd Fellows. One of them was Father Titian Anthos Miani, who joined Scio Lodge No. 102 of the Independent Order of Odd Fellows in Linden, California. As soon as the controversy declined and religious leaders began to accept secular organizations, numerous pastors, priests, bishops and rabbis from different religious sects have become members and some even held leadership positions in the Odd Fellows. However, since the new code of Canon Law did not explicitly mention Masonic orders and other secret societies, the Office of the Sacred Congregation for the Doctrine of the Faith issued a declaration on Masonic associations in 1983, stating clearly that the opposition of the Catholic Church stated in the earlier version of the Canon Law had not changed.

== See also ==
- Fraternal order
- Freemasonry
- Secret society

== Bibliography ==
The origins and history of the Oddfellows are not easily verified; some of the possible facts are mixed with unverifiable myth, legend, folklore, and opinion. The following is a far-from-exhaustive list of "histories" of Oddfellows – unfortunately, few of them quote their sources.

- Burn, PPGM, of Glasgow (c. 1846), Historical Sketch of Oddfellowship, Manchester: A. Heywood.
- James, Dr Bob (2010), They Call Each Brother – Secret Societies and the Strange Death of Mateship in Australia, 1788–2010. Self-published.
- James, Dr Bob, Odd Fellows, The Australian Centre for Secret Societies, Fraternalism and Mateship (i.e. Self-published.). Contains numerous articles and, according to its author, "is constantly being updated".
- Moffrey, Past Grand Master Robert (1904), The Rise and Progress of the Manchester Unity of the Independent Order of Oddfellows, 1810–1904, Manchester: The Grand Master & Board of Directors of the Order, Printers John Heywood.
- Spry, J (1867), History of Oddfellowship, Paternoster Row, London: Fred Pitman deals, as set forth on its title page, with "Its origin, tradition, and objects, with a general review of the results arising from its adoption by the branch known as the Manchester Unity from the year 1810 to the present time." The book was published by Fred Pitman, of London, and by the author at Plymouth.
- "History: The history of our society". GUOOFS (The Grand United Order of Oddfellows Friendly Society).
- History of the IOOF in Marin County, archived from the original on 19 January 2013.
- "Odd Fellows Cemetery, Knoxville, TN". knoxvilletn.gov.
- Odd Fellows Rest, the history of an IOOF cemetery in New Orleans.
- Brooks, Charles H. (1902), The Official History and Manual of the Grand United Order of Odd Fellows in America, Odd Fellows' Journal Print, p. 274
