= Peter Ogden =

Peter Ogden may refer to:

- Sir Peter Ogden (businessman) (born 1947), English businessman, one of the founders of Computacenter
- Peter Ogden (Odd Fellows founder) (died 1852), founder of the Grand United Order of Odd Fellows in America
- Peter Skene Ogden (1790–1854), British-Canadian fur trader and explorer
