= Grand United Order of Odd Fellows in America =

American fraternal order

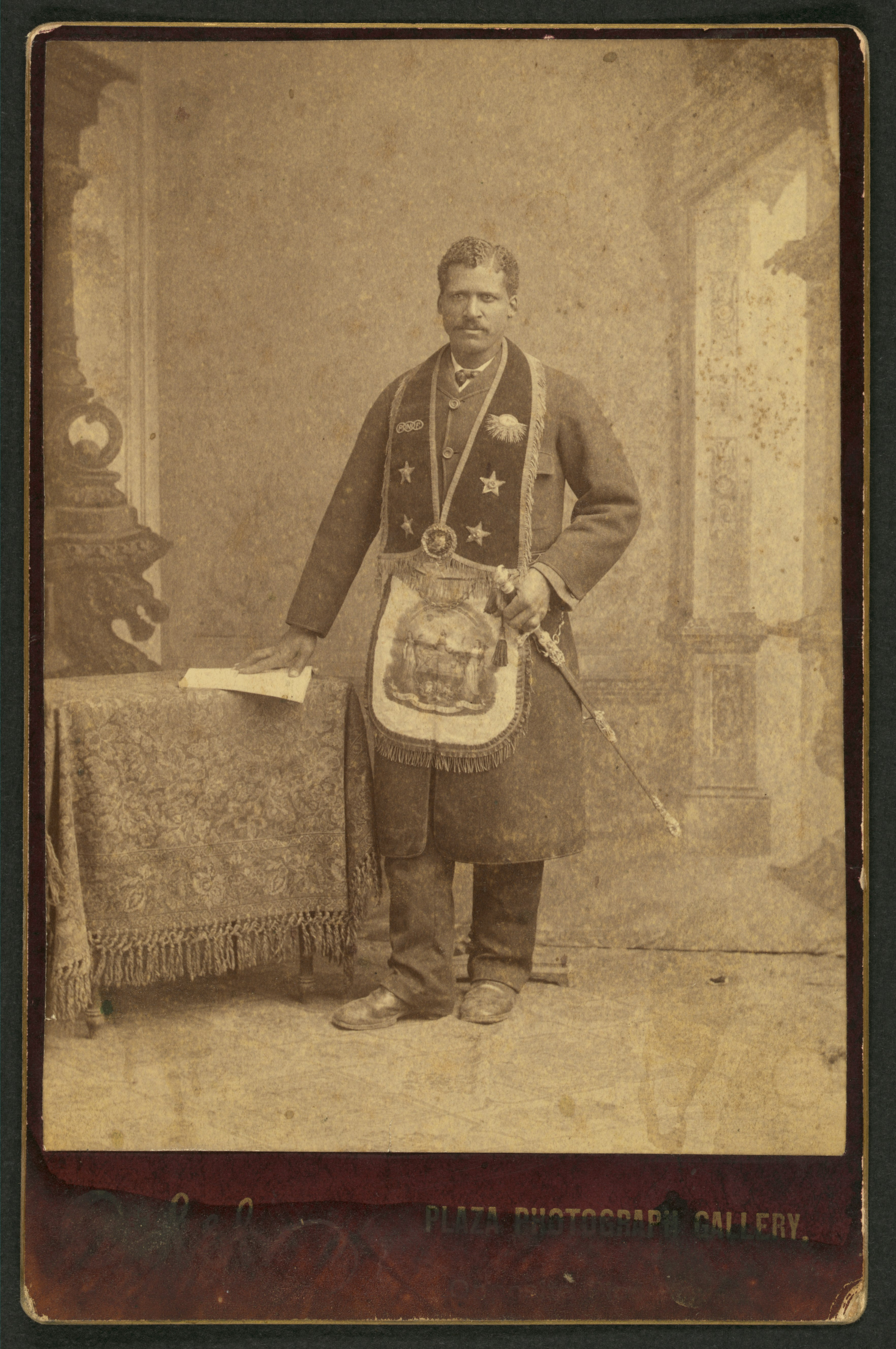

The Grand United Order of Odd Fellows, American Jurisdiction is a jurisdiction of the Grand United Order of Oddfellows in the United States, Jamaica, Canada, South America, and other locations. Since its founding in 1843, its membership has principally included African Americans, due to their being discriminated against in most other fraternal orders in America at the time.

== History ==
The Grand United Order of Odd Fellows in America traces its origin to the original Grand United Order of Oddfellows in England, which was established in 1798. In 1810 a group split from the Order and became the Independent Order of Odd Fellows, Manchester Unity. In 1819 a branch of Oddfellowship was introduced into the United States by Thomas Wildey, and remained an organic party of the Manchester Unity until 1843, when it became a separate organization under the name Independent Order of Odd Fellows. By that time there were only four known lodges of Odd Fellows in the United States owing allegiance to the Grand United Order; they were located near Pottsville, Pennsylvania. note: those four lodges were "self-inducted".

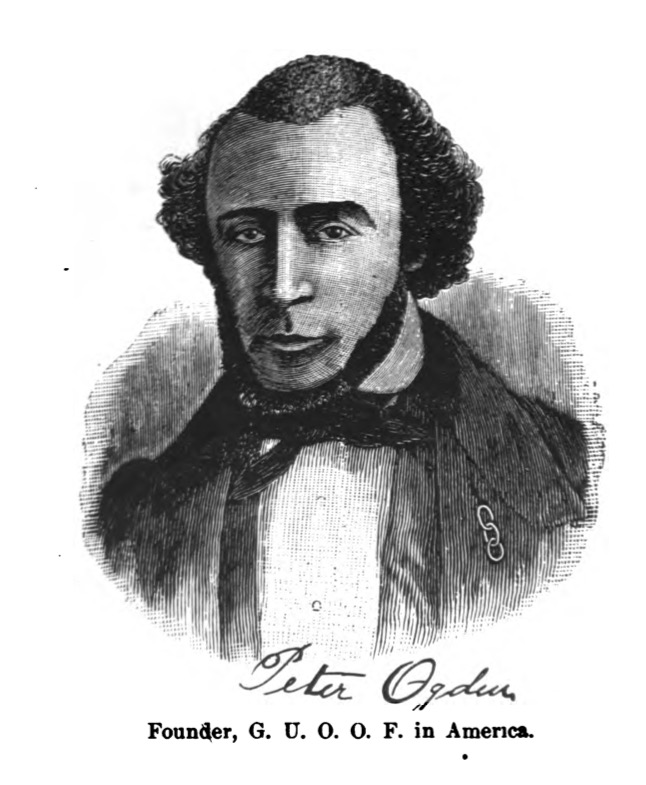

In 1842 members of the Philomathean Institute in New York petitioned the Manchester Unity aligned American Odd Fellows for a dispensation to form their institute into a lodge of Odd Fellows. A Committee of five Grand Masters and a Noble Father was appointed to constitute a Lodge in the City of New York to be known as the Philomathean Lodge No. 646, Grand United Order of Oddfellows. They were denied, because they were black. At this point, Peter Ogden, a black sailor who had been initiated into a Grand United Order affiliated lodge, Victoria Lodge No. 448 in Liverpool, suggested that they try to receive recognition through them. This idea was approved, and Ogden sailed to England, applied to Victoria Lodge No. 448 who communicated with the Grand United Order's governing body at Leeds. Ogden obtained recognition from the Committee of Management for the Philomathean Institute to become Philomathean Lodge, No. 646 in January 1843.

On March 1, 1843, On Elm Street in the City of New York and State of New York, Philomathean Lodge was instituted at 12 noon with 48 members. At the installation of the first offices of the Lodge, Peter Ogden delivered to the Noble Grand all books and paraphernalia belonging to the new lodge.

Past Grand Master Joseph Jones, District Secretary of Liverpool, England, and member of Victoria Lodge No. 448, Grand United Order of Oddfellows, delivered the oration. Brother James B. Field, Noble Grand of Philomathean Lodge No. 646 responded most eloquently, and also called upon his staff of officers to express their gratitude to the delegates from England.

The four existing Grand United Order-affiliated lodges in America refused to recognize Ogden as Deputy, admittedly because they did not wish to associate with black people.

Peter Ogden thought he had found a haven by receiving so much praise. He sent for his sister to come to America where he could have a temporary home. But with the passage of time and the deaths of some of the members, his sweet and gentle voice became unwelcome. He was mocked and jeered openly. He took this performance to heart and discontinued his visits to the lodge. As time went on he became ill and heartbroken and in the solitude of his home he died. He was buried without receiving the last rites of the Order.

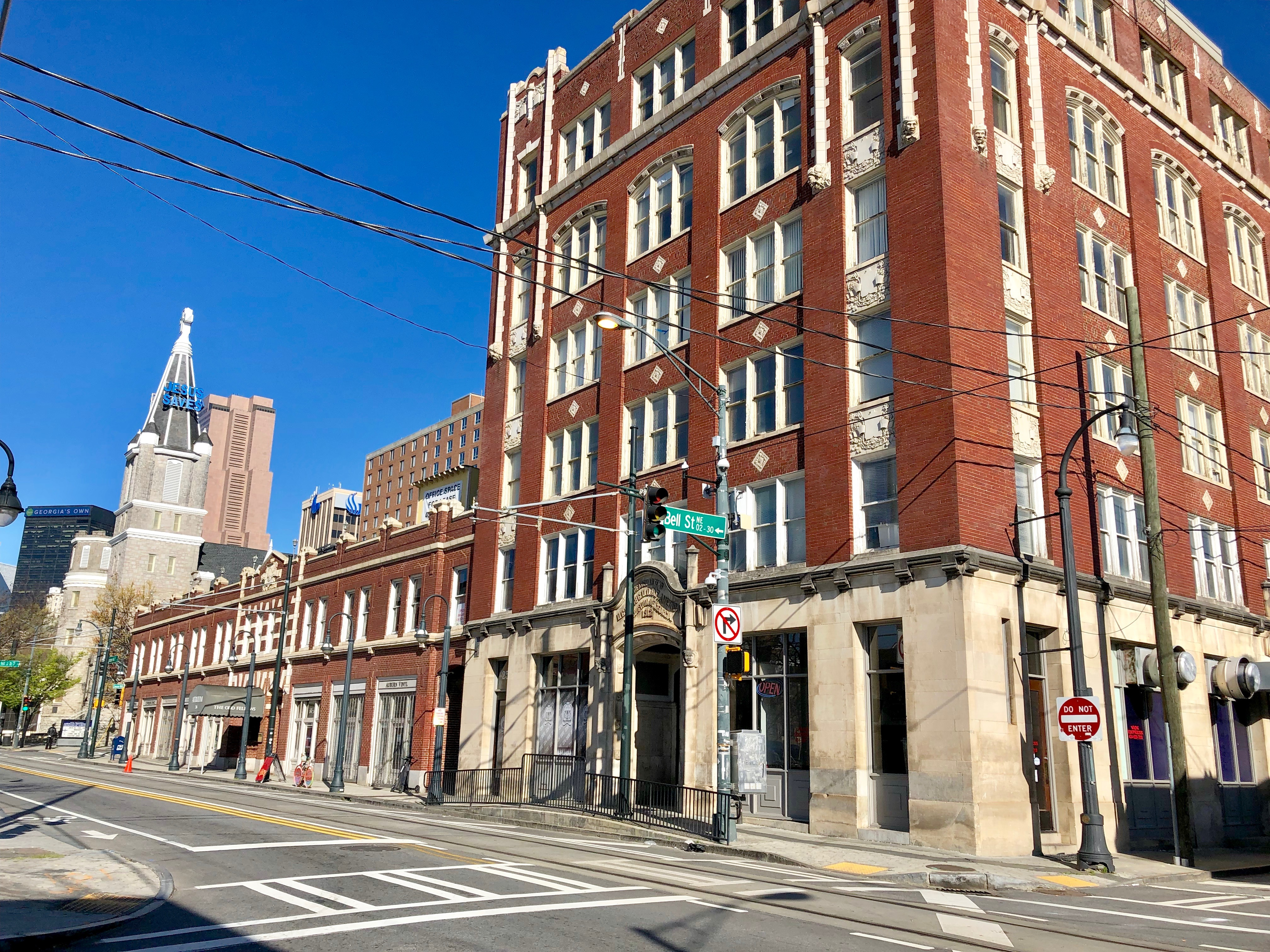
The group's building in Atlanta

Members of the Order heard of his death from overseas and searched until they found his sister, but she refused to give any information. Her reply was, “You killed my brother. I do not want to see any of you.”

After the institution of Philomathean Lodge, there was no provision for women. A motion prevailed that each member who desires to may bring his wife, mother or daughter as a contributing member and be benefited thereby. Hence, from such desires, the Household of Ruth was formed to extend, strengthen and perpetuate the bonds of Friendship, Love and Truth.

A fixed admission fee, monthly contribution and special sick and death benefit were enacted and had long continued after Households were established. Some sisters paid dues in both places. This list was continued until 1928.

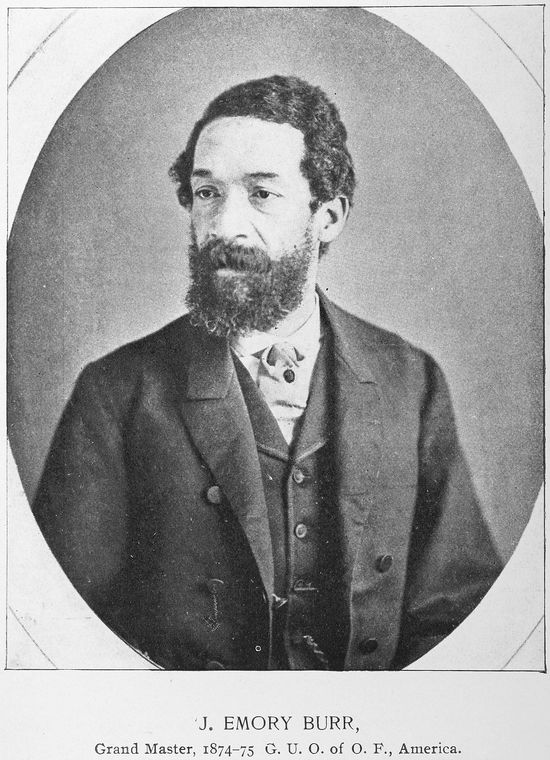
J. Emory Burr

December 19, 1843, Philomathean Lodge No.646, Grand United Order of Oddfellows, received the authority to establish a Sub-Committee of Management of the Grand United Order of Oddfellows of England, subject to the resolutions and under the control of the Committee of Management of the Grand United Order of Oddfellows, England, of eight Past officers if possible, to carry out the extension of the Order in granting dispensations.

By 1847 there were 22 lodges in Ogden's organization and in 1851 lodges from New York, Pennsylvania, Connecticut, Massachusetts, New Jersey, Delaware and Maryland met at a Moveable feast in New Haven.

A distinction between the names of the two organizations is that the Independent Order of Odd Fellows renders Odd Fellows as two words. With the Grand United Order of Oddfellows, it is one word.

== Organization ==
The Lodge has been the basic local unit of the Order since its founding. Councils of Past Grand Masters, also known as the Patriarchal Order of Past Grand Masters in America, were added in 1844 and are composed, as the name suggests, by Past Grand Masters of the Order. Patriarchies, composed of Past Grand Masters who have rendered particularly valuable service to the Order, were created during a reorganization in 1873, and are modeled on a similar British adjunct.

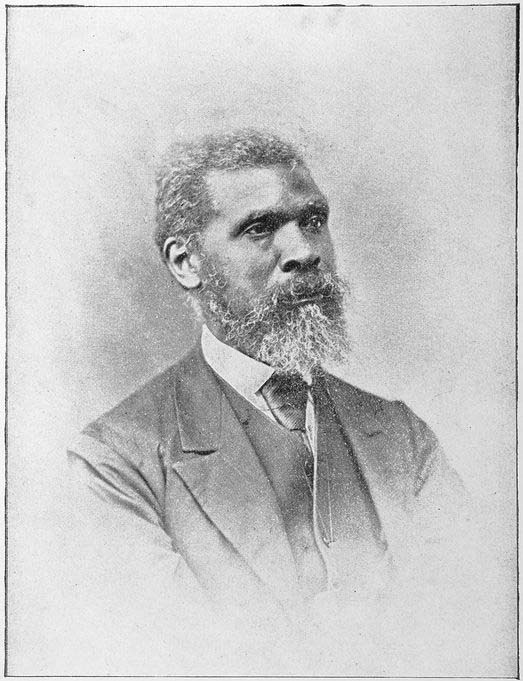
John C. Bowers

The number of lodges and other local units grew steadily during the 19th century. There were 32 in 1850 and 66 in 1860, though 17 of these were inactive. In 1863, at the twentieth anniversary of the Order, it was announced that there were 50 active lodges in the United States, Canada, and Bermuda and in 1867 there were 66 active lodges. During the 1870s the Order spread west and south, establishing lodges in Florida, Texas, Colorado and California. By the time of the Order's 1892 convention it had spread to Cuba. In 1897 there were 2,253 lodges and thirty six Grand Lodges.

By 1979, the structure had apparently changed somewhat, with the national organization called the Grand Lodge, six "regional groups" and local Lodges. National conventions were then held biennially and the headquarters were in Philadelphia The headquarters remain in Philadelphia (as of 2011).

== Lodges and halls ==
Ocean Springs, Mississippi had a hall. Louisville had several lodges.Union Lodge No. 1341 was established in 1867. St. John No. 1364 and St. Luke No. 1371 lodges were established by 1872. Two lodges of the G. U. O. O. F. sister society, the Household of Ruth, were established in Louisville in 1877: No. 24 and No. 60 and No. 4213 was established by 1911. The District Grand Lodge No. 19 was in New Castle, Kentucky.

== Membership ==
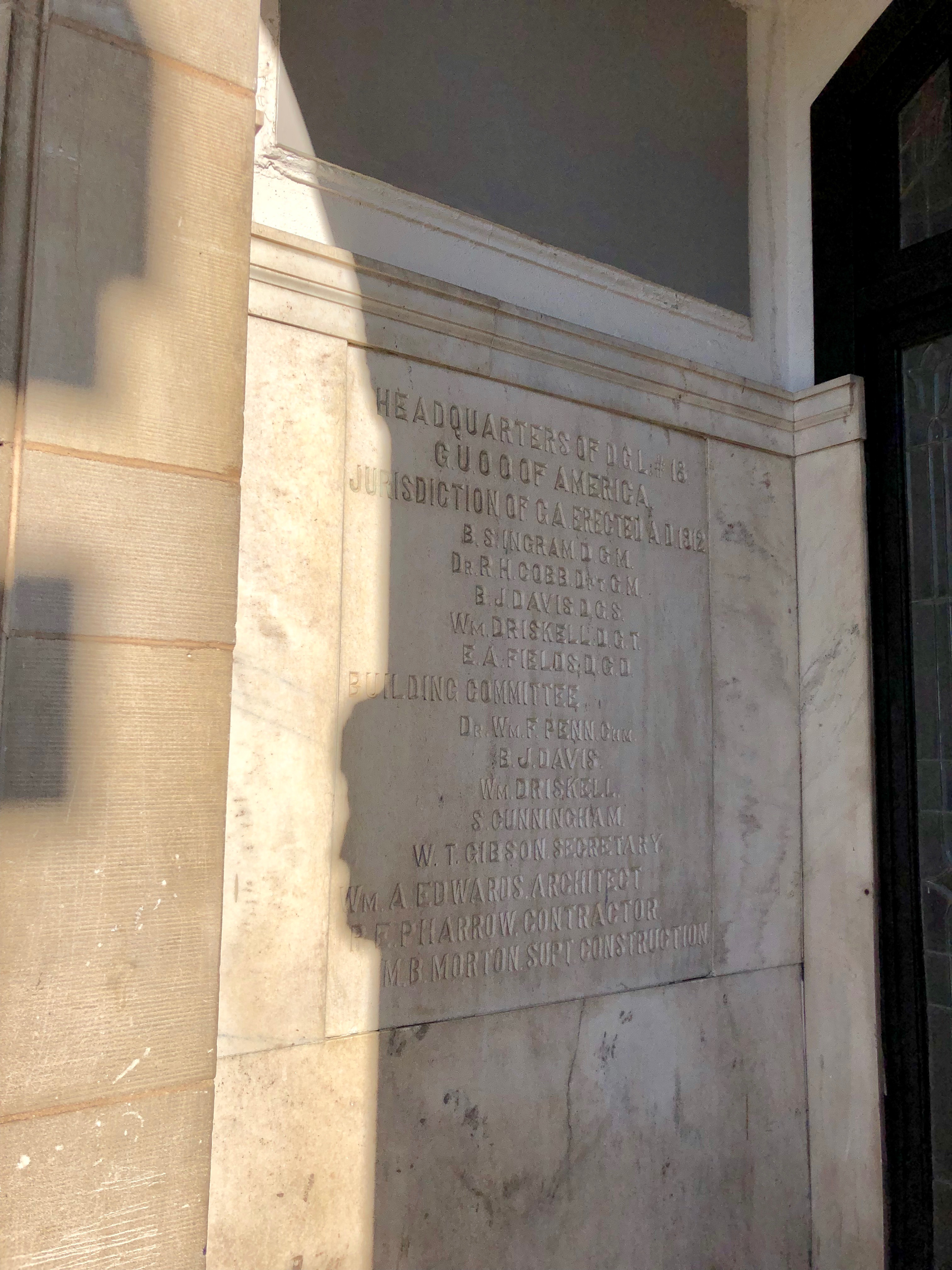
Cornerstone of Atlanta Building with names

Membership has always been open to people of any race, though it has remained a predominantly African American Order. In 1979 there were 108,000 members. Their female auxiliary known as the Household of Ruth flourished during the golden age of fraternalism with nearly 100,000+ members. Unlike the Independent Order, the members of the Household of Ruth maintain their independence from the GUOOF, although the men can attain the Ruth Degree.

== See also ==
- Odd Fellows
- Odd Fellows (disambiguation)
- Prince Hall Freemasonry
- Improved Benevolent and Protective Order of Elks of the World
