= Thomas Wildey =

Founder of the IOOF in North America (1782–1861)

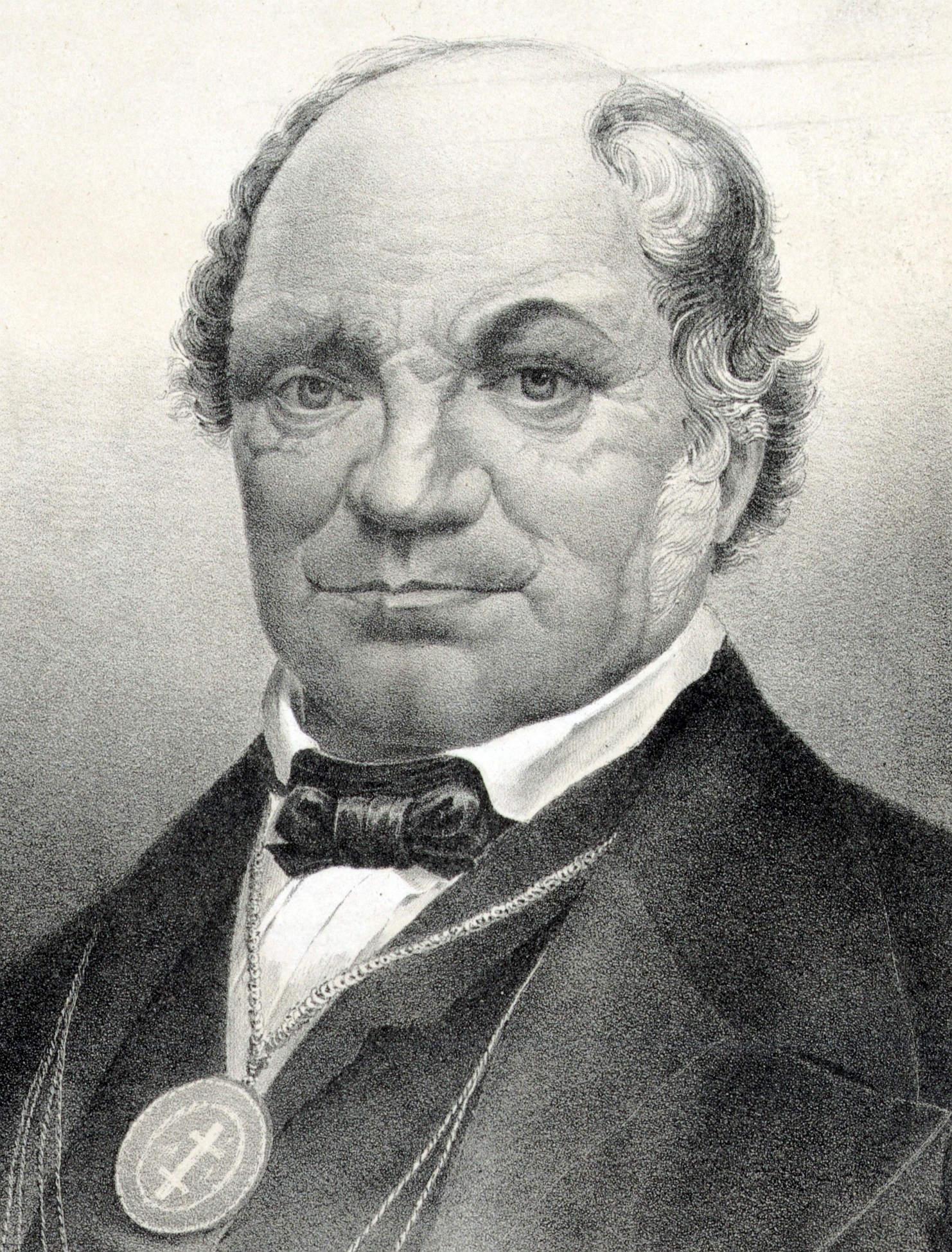
- Born: 1782; London, England, United Kingdom
- Died: 1861 (aged 78–79); United States
- Occupation: Philanthropist

Thomas Wildey (1782–1861) was an English-born American who was the founder of the Independent Order of Odd Fellows (IOOF) in North America.

== Biography ==
Wildey was born in London, England, in 1782. He was left an orphan five years later, and the IOOF pledge to "Educate the Orphan" sprang from his personal childhood experiences. At the age of 14, Wildey went to live with an uncle. After he had 9 years of schooling, he became an apprentice to a maker of coach springs. He joined the British Oddfellows in 1804.

When Wildey emigrated to America in 1817, the British were still unpopular in the States because of the War of 1812. In that year Baltimore was suffering both a yellow fever epidemic and mass unemployment. An outgoing personality, Wildey missed companionship and advertised in the newspaper to determine if there were any other Odd Fellows in Baltimore; he requested them to meet him at the Seven Stars Inn.

On April 26, 1819, Wildey and the four men who responded to the advertisement, John Welch, John Duncan, John Cheatam, and Richard Rushworth, formed the Independent Order of Odd Fellows in North America, dedicating the Order to achieve philanthropic goals. Other Englishmen who were Odd Fellows had grouped in the states along the Eastern Seaboard, and Wildey gathered them all into the newly formed fraternity. He traveled widely to set up lodges in the most recently settled parts of the country.

At the time of his death in 1861, there were more than 200,000 members of the IOOF. In the late 19th century and early 20th century the IOOF became the largest Fraternal Order in North America with more than two million members.

== Baltimore monument ==
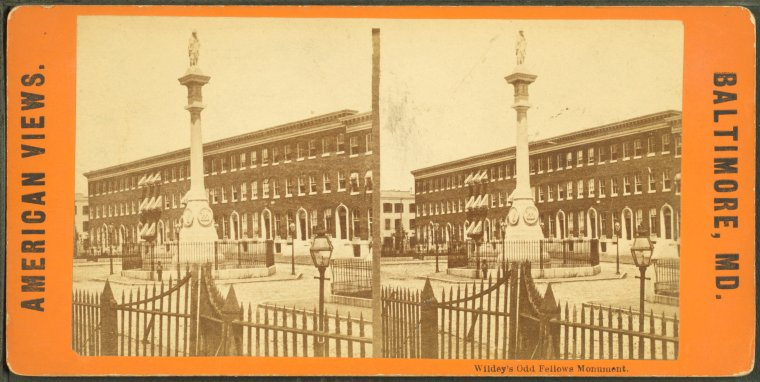
Stereoscopic image of the Wildey monument in Baltimore taken ca. 1875.

In April 1865 a monument was erected to Wildey in Baltimore, consisting of a statue on a Doric column that is 52 feet in height. The monument is located at the intersection of North Broadway and Lamley Street.
