= Household of Ruth =

African American women's fraternal organization

The Household of Ruth is an auxiliary body of the Grand United Order of Odd Fellows in America open to both Odd Fellows and related women. The Grand United Order of Odd Fellows in America is the historically African American organization that was formed in 1843 by Peter Ogden. The Household of Ruth degree was founded by Patrick H. Reason in 1858. There are three degrees based on the story of Ruth in the Bible.

Juvenile Branches are formed under local Household of Ruth bodies. The members of Household of Ruth are called inmates, and the Household provides sick and funeral benefits to its members. Symbolism of the order included a gold sheaf of wheat, gold stars, and a pink rosette with a gold star in the center.

== History ==
The Ruth degree was created by Patrick H. Reason in 1858. Open to both men and women, the first woman to lead the organization was Mary Alice Parker, who succeeded J. W. Grant, Most Worthy Grand Superior, from 1887 to 1908. Parker served as Worthy Grand Recorder under Grant before taking the office of Most Worthy Grand Superior from 1908 to 1927.

During the late nineteenth century, Households were founded in many states including Virginia and Kentucky. In 1893, there were over 800 Households with 40,000 members.

== Famous members ==
- Jane Johnson Endsley
- Elizabeth Harriet Stevens Gray Bowser
