= Grand United Order of Oddfellows =

Oddfellows grand lodge in Manchester, England

Grand United Order of Oddfellows Friendly Society (GUOOFS) is an Odd Fellows grand lodge founded in 1798 and based in Manchester, England.

== History ==
From the early days of Odd fellowship sprang two fraternal orders, the 'Patriotic Order' and the 'Ancient Order'. The existence of the 'Patriotic' Order has been confirmed, as a copy of the rituals revised by a meeting of the Grand Lodge held in London in 1797 has come to hand.

The first constitutional record of the Order's founding is the Bond of Union to establish 'Amicable Lodge' Sheffield. A framed copy of the Bond dated January 6, 1798 and signed by the Grand Master and the Grand Secretary on behalf of the meeting of the Grand Lodge of the United Order of Odd Fellows is held at Head Office on Talbot Road Old Trafford Manchester M16 0PL.

However, it is questionable if this really is the true date of the establishment of the Order as past publications indicate that the 'Amicable Lodge' declared independence in 1813. What records do not dispute, is the claim of the Grand United Order of Oddfellows to be the oldest Branch Friendly Society. During these early days, there were a number of disputes and disagreements between the Grand Lodge and the Branches and this led to a special meeting being held, where a number of branches splintered off to form a new Order in 1810 - now better known as the Independent Order of Odd Fellows (Manchester Unity) Friendly Society.

Subsequent breakaways from the parent Order and from this new Order resulted in the formation of further Orders of Odd Fellows. In the case of the parent Order, various lodges seceded in 1832 to found the Ancient & Noble (Bolton Unity) which subsequently dissolved in 1962, and in the case of the New Order, the Nottingham Odd Fellows.

During the early part of the 19th century there were further disagreements regarding the undemocratic way Rules were made and revised without the approval of Branches, which restricted growth in membership.

Eventually, the differences were resolved and overall government became the prerogative of the biennial delegate General Meeting vested with powers to make or amend rules, and appoint a central committee (Board of Directors) with authority to administer between meetings. The General Meeting is now held annually and is known as the Annual Moveable Conference.

The importance of membership in the early days was to safeguard family interests in times of sickness and adversity, as such protection was not provided by the State at the time. However, between 1912 and 1948 the Order administered State Benefits.

Branch meetings provided the opportunity to practice debating skills and they became a training ground for members with political ambitions. They also offered the security of belonging to a fraternal organisation with Branches throughout England, enabling members to meet other members on their travels.

The Grand United Order of Oddfellows have no restrictions on joining, and any member may attain the office of Grand Master or other principal position in the hierarchy of the Order.

The motto or watch words "Friendship, Love and Truth" spread abroad with travelling members and Branches were established overseas leading to the formation of Sub-Committees of Management in America, by Peter Ogden in 1843 which currently has 50 main lodges and 56 Household of Ruth lodges with nearly 1,000 members in total, and also in Africa and Australia. Links Grand United Order of Oddfellows
