= Peter Ogden (Odd Fellows founder) =

Founder of Odd Fellows in the USA

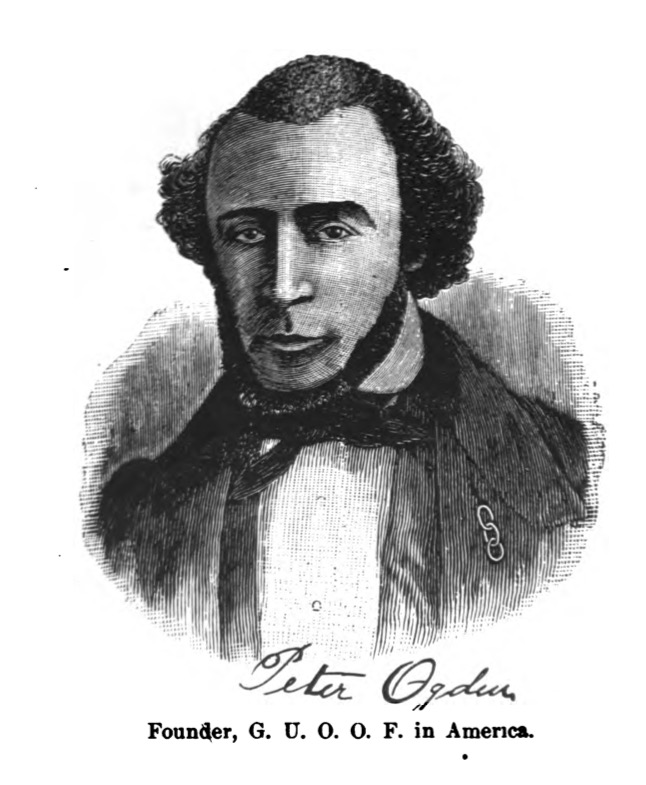
Peter Ogden, Founder of the Grand United Order of Odd Fellows in America

Peter Ogden (died 1852) was the founder of the Grand United Order of Odd Fellows in America. This fraternal order was a Benefit society open to African American men and was heavily involved with the early civil rights movement. Ogden was born in the West Indies and served on the S.S. Patrick Henry as a ship's steward.

== Early life ==
Not much is known about Peter Ogden's early life. The official history of the Grand United Order of Odd Fellows in America notes that he was born in the West Indies, with one source specifying the island of Jamaica. Ogden was a sailor and then steward on the S.S. Patrick Henry that sailed between Liverpool and New York City. While in Liverpool, Ogden was initiated in Odd Fellowship in Victoria Lodge, No. 448.

== The Grand United Order of Odd Fellows in America ==
The Philomathean Institute was formed in New York City in 1842 by educated Black men of that city including Patrick H. Reason and James Fields. The Institute petitioned the Independent Order of Odd Fellows for a charter, but they were denied because of their race. Ogden, informed about the rejection, urged the men to instead seek recognition from the Grand United Order of Oddfellows in England in what he thought was a purer form of Odd Fellowship without American racism. Ogden returned to England and petitioned the Victoria Lodge to grant a charter to the institute. In 1843, the Philomathean Lodge, No. 646, was established in New York City with Peter Ogden as the first Grand Master.

Ogden initiated the other men into Odd Fellowship bringing over the ritual and symbolism from England and oversaw the creation of a second lodge in New York, the Hamilton Lodge, No. 710. Unity Lodge, No. 711, was soon established in Philadelphia. Rising Star, No. 713, established in Hartford, Connecticut was the first lodge in Connecticut. Ogden continued to sail in-between New York and England and often carried correspondence, questions, and reports between the leadership in New York and the leadership in England. By Ogden's death in 1852, there were twenty-five lodges in America with over 1500 members.

== Personal life ==
Peter Ogden was married, though his wife's name is unknown. He died on November 29, 1852, in New York.
