= Sunnyslope, Phoenix =

Sunnyslope, Arizona
- Populated place
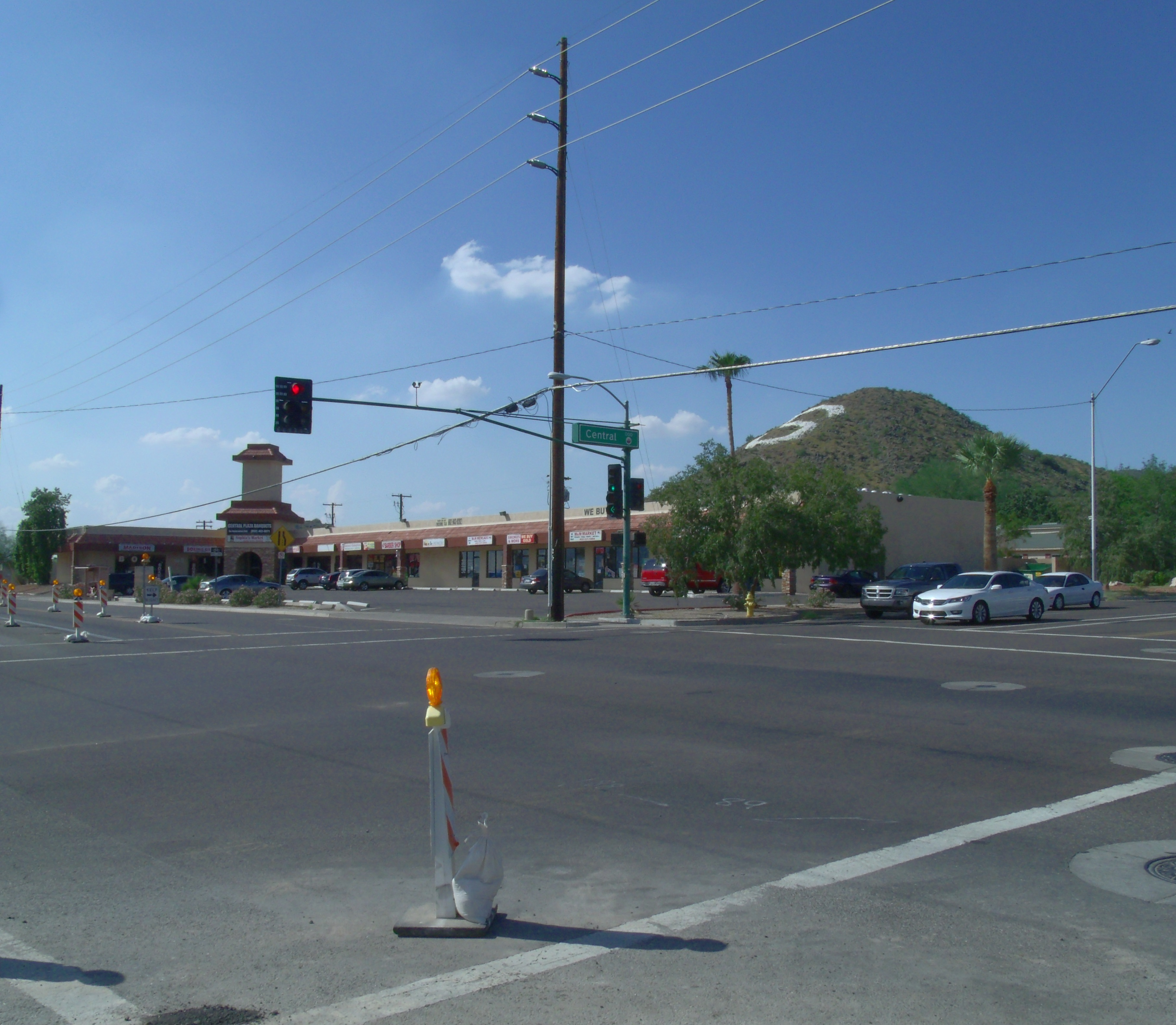
- Intersection of Central Avenue and Hatcher Road

- Location in Maricopa County and the state of Arizona
- Coordinates: 33°33′57″N 112°03′55″W

The Sunnyslope community is an established neighborhood within the borders of the city of Phoenix, Arizona. The geographic boundaries are 19th Avenue to the west, Cactus Road to the north, 16th Street to the east, and Northern Avenue to the south. This area covers approximately nine square miles (23 km^{2}) and is divided into nine census tracts. The Sunnyslope community is included in parts of three zip code areas: 85020, 85021 and 85029.

After four failed attempts to become its own city, Sunnyslope was annexed into the city of Phoenix in 1959. While it exists in the middle of a large metropolitan area, the Sunnyslope community prides itself on a small-town feel and distinct cultural identity.

== "Sunny Slope" founder ==
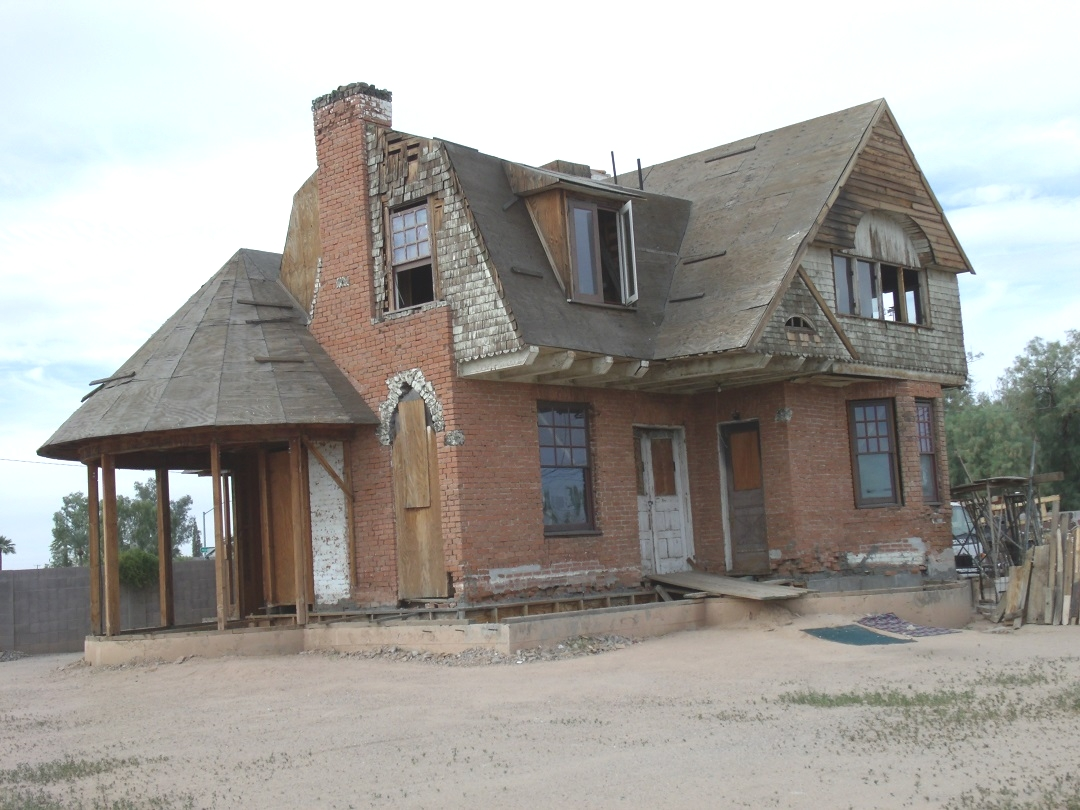
The William R. Norton House', which is in a deteriorating condition, was built in 1895 and is located at 2222 W. Washington St. It is now being restored and listed in the Phoenix Historic Property Register.

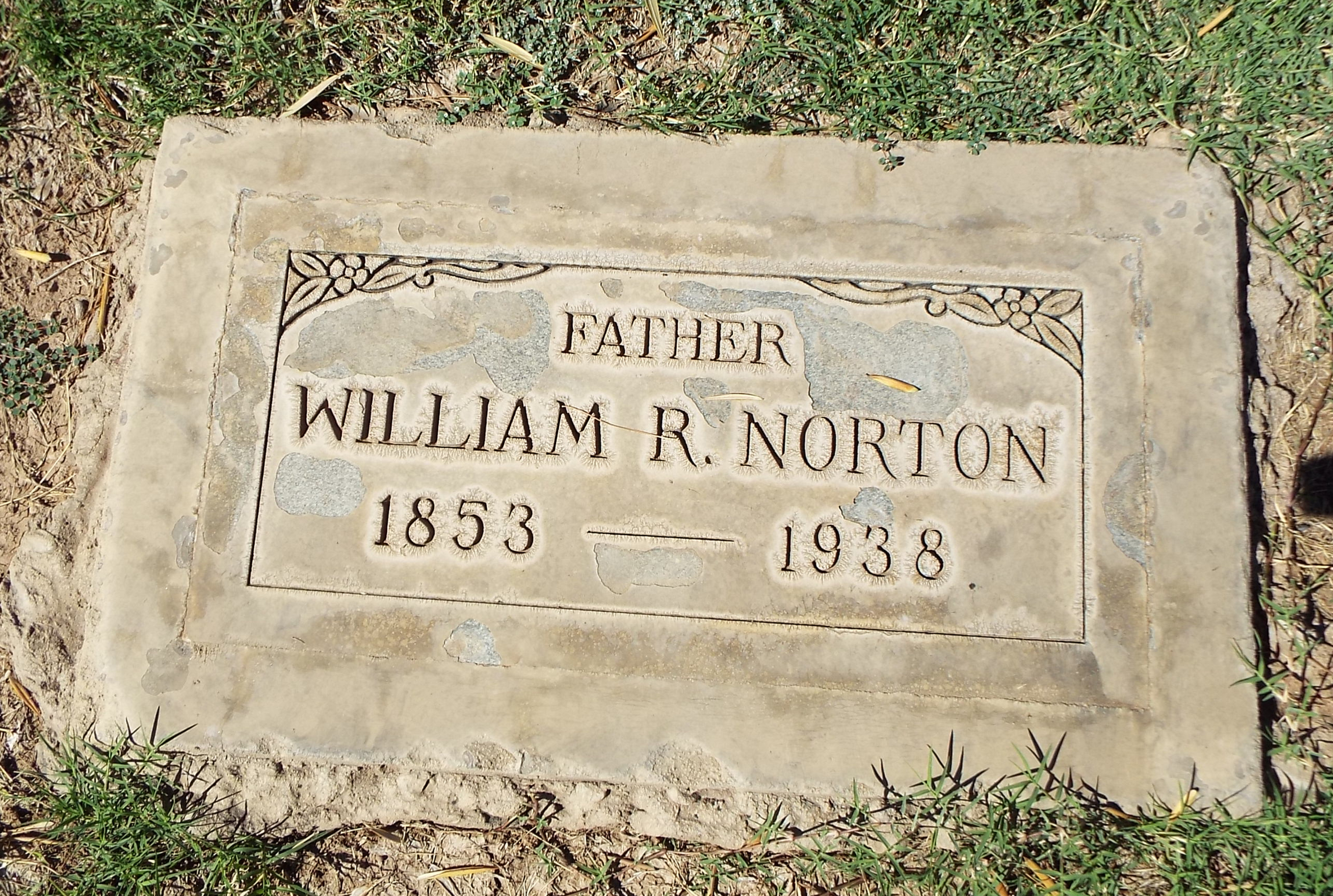
The grave site of William R. Norton, the founder of Sunnyslope

Sunnyslope is known for having been settled by poor tuberculants who spent their last money traveling west for the drier climate and cleaner air, but the subdivision called "Sunny Slope" was first platted by architect William R. Norton in 1911.

Norton was born on October 25, 1853, in the state of Massachusetts. He moved to San Francisco, California where he met and married Mary Emma. There he became a prominent architect. However, while living in California, his health began to deteriorate. In 1891, he moved to Phoenix, Arizona believing that the dry air and sunshine would benefit his health. Norton designed the Carnegie Library, the city's first library, and the Gila County Courthouse in Globe, Arizona. In 1895, he built a house on Washington Street and in 1907 the rest of his family joined him in Phoenix.

Norton began to invest in large open tracts in the desert and platted "Sunny Slope." He and his family eventually moved to the area and built a home there. Reportedly, one of his daughters looked at the sun shining on the area's rolling Phoenix mountains and exclaimed, "What a pretty, sunny slope!" Inspired by the phrase, Mr. Norton named the area Sunny Slope. Norton died in 1938 from the injuries which he received in an auto-pedestrian accident. He was buried in Phoenix's Greenwood/Memory Lawn Mortuary & Cemetery.

== Sunnyslope ==
The name appeared as two words until after World War II when it was combined into one word. The Sunnyslope Subdivision's original boundaries were from Central Avenue on the west, to Dunlap Avenue on the north and from 3rd Street on east to Alice on the south. By 1919, Sunnyslope was a natural desert area with only four or five cottages surrounded by cactus and sagebrush.

With no irrigation north of the Arizona Canal, the Sunnyslope desert was a very dry area and was considered to be a good place to live for people recovering from tuberculosis or asthma. During this period, it was common for people from eastern states, known as "health seekers," to move to Arizona.

Many of these people built tent houses or small cottages, planning to get well and then return to their former homes. Others, having spent their last dimes to move west in search of health, pitched tents or slept on porches. There were no roads or electricity.

== Desert Mission and Angels of the Desert ==
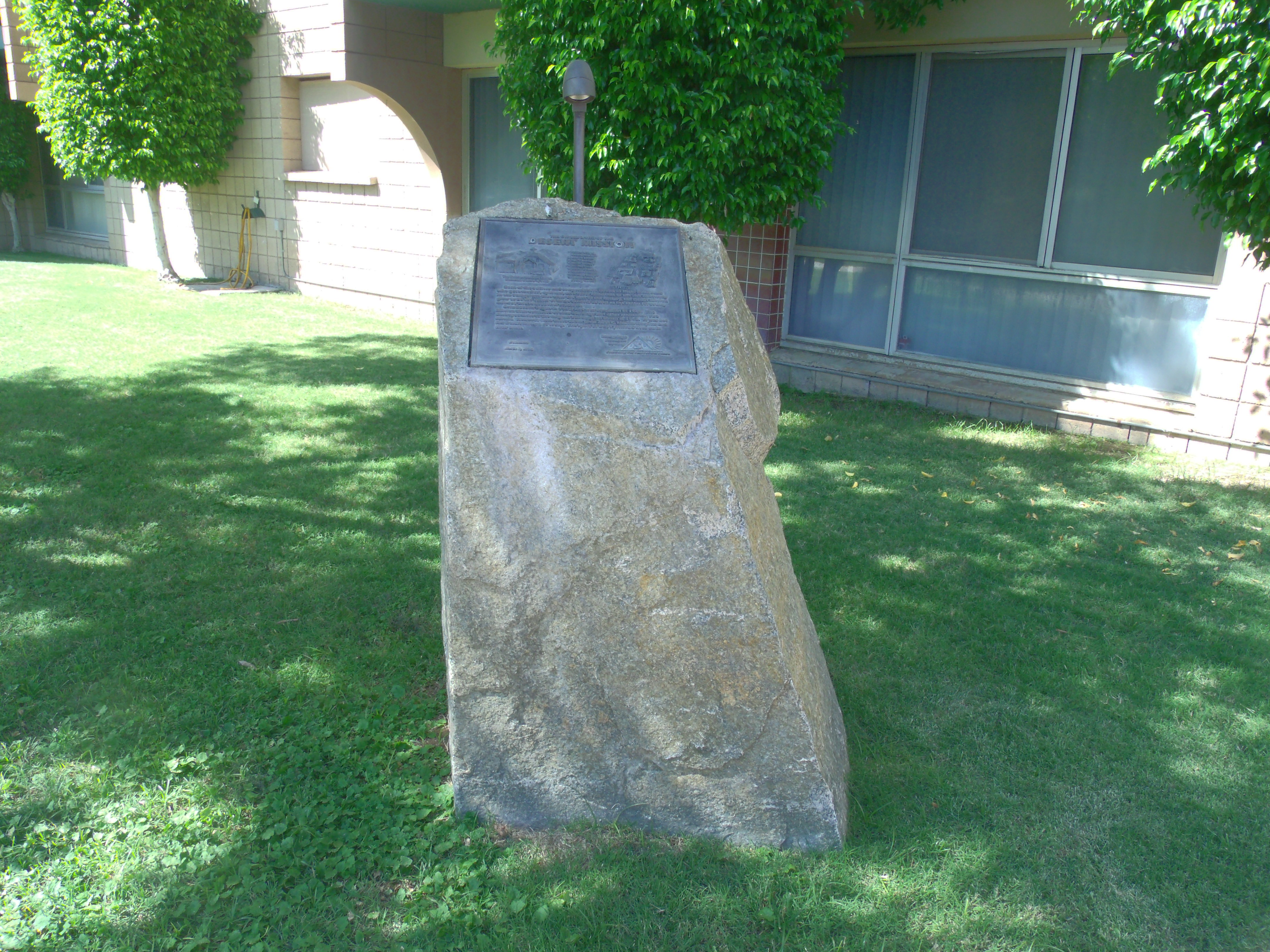
This is where the historic Desert Mission of Sunnyslope was founded. The area in which the Desert Mission was located at 5th Street and Eva Road and its area consisted less than an acre in size. It served the community from 1927 to 1940. A plaque marking the historical site, commissioned by the Sunnyslope Historical Society and the John C. Lincoln Hospital, was placed on this site on March 7, 1992.

Marguerite and William Albert Colley were the second permanent residents of Sunnyslope after purchasing five acres for $100 per acre near 3rd Street and Townley.

They had come to the desert in 1919 for their son's health. Marguerite was a practical nurse and a social worker. She soon began visiting her sick neighbors bringing food and aide to their bedsides. She met Elizabeth Beatty who was also providing help for those suffering from tuberculosis or asthma.

Sunnyslope neighbors looked forward to and welcomed the visits of Elizabeth Beatty and Marguerite Colley and these ladies soon became known as the "Angels of the Desert."

In 1927, the Desert Mission was established. This was a facility – a comprehensive, faith-based community center — that provided for the medical, social, and religious needs of the people living in the community. In 1936, there were approximately 600 residents in Sunny Slope. There was still much vacant land, covered with vegetation and cacti.

In the late 1940s, after World War II, the population of the community expanded tremendously. Many small businesses, churches and schools were established. The first school, Sunnyslope Elementary School, was opened in 1949, Mountain View Elementary School was opened in 1952, and the third elementary school built in Sunnyslope was Desert View which opened in 1956. Sunnyslope High School opened in 1953.

As the neighborhood grew, the medical functions of the Desert Mission became a separate entity by the 1950s, later known as the John C. Lincoln Health Network, and now known as "HonorHealth" (Note: In this case there is no separation between the words "Honor" and "Health") (after a 2013 merger with Scottsdale Healthcare). Its 266-bed Sunnyslope flagship hospital is now one of eight Level I trauma facilities in Arizona. The Desert Mission remains in operation as a subsidiary of this healthcare group. Through its food bank, children's dental clinic, community health center, behavioral health clinic and a licensed and accredited child care facility, the Desert Mission continues to respond to the needs of Sunnyslope and North Phoenix.

John C. Lincoln, an Ohio inventor and industrialist who founded Lincoln Electric, relocated to the Sunnyslope district in 1931 with his wife Helen, to treat her tuberculosis; almost immediately, the Lincolns became major financial supporters of Desert Mission and took on key leadership roles in the organization for most of the remainder of their lives. Helen Lincoln lived to the age of 102, after having been given just two more years to live by doctors.

In 1946, Charles and Lillian Stough founded "Sand" a biweekly newspaper. It was Sunnyslope's first newspaper. In 1950, the newspaper was sold and incorporated into the Sunnyslope Journal. In 1956, The Stough family resumed publishing and named their paper "Sage".

== The King of Sunnyslope ==
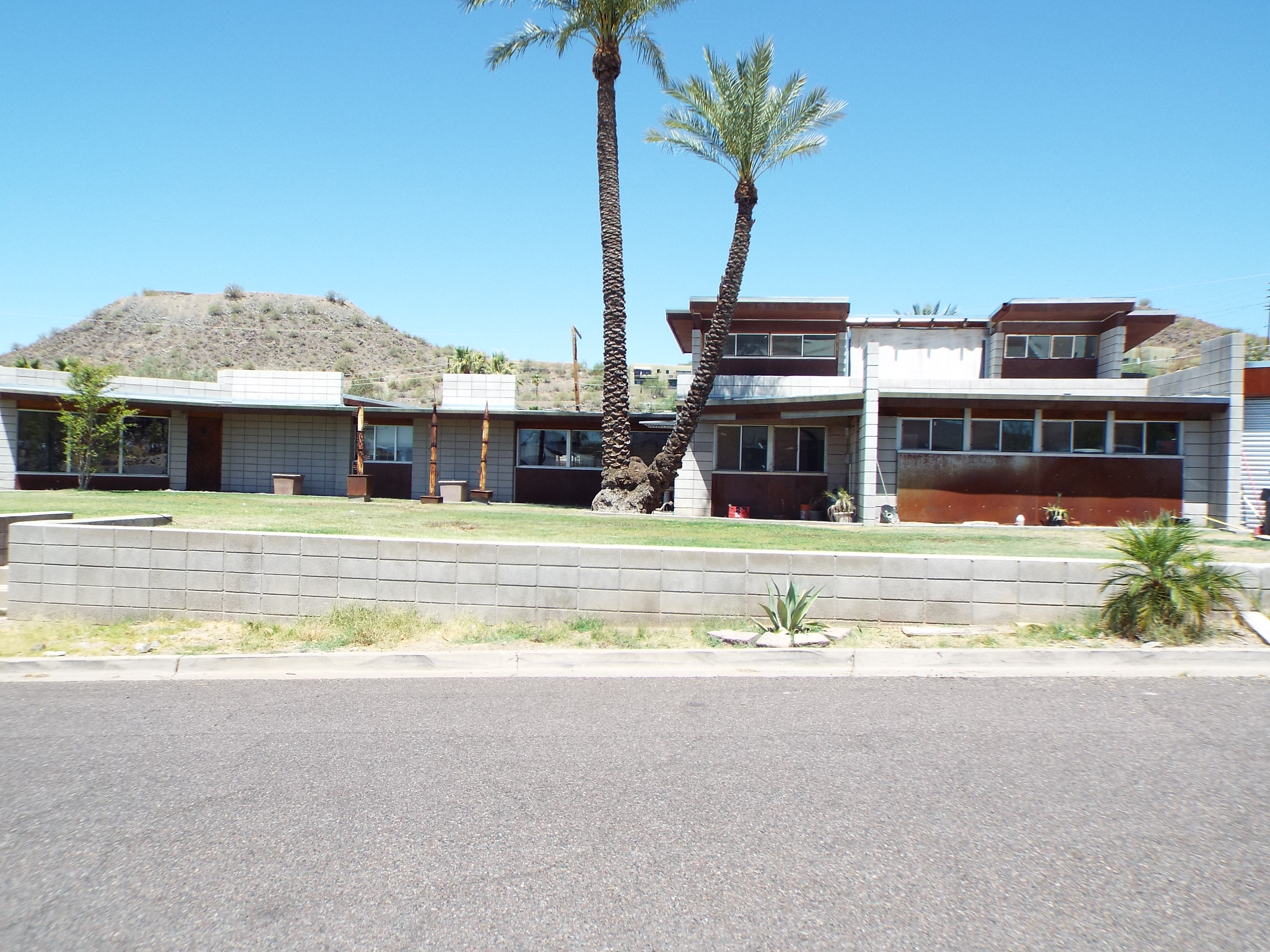
Dr. Hall's residence in Sunnyslope

Dr. Kenneth E. Hall was a native of Oklahoma who lived in Sunnyslope during the 1940s. Hall considered himself the "King of Sunnyslope" and built the biggest house in Sunnyslope. Hall, considered by his peers as controversial, operated the North Mountain Hospital, a 40-bed hospital in Sunnyslope, which he built in 1955. The hospital had a primate zoo located on the hospital grounds. In 1963, he illegally diverted $16,564 in government funds to help in the construction of El Cid Castle, a bowling alley which resembled a Moorish Castle.

Hall had been performing unsanctioned medical operations, and his physician's license was revoked in 1971 after four patients died during gastric bypass surgery. In 1974, he pleaded guilty to diverting thousands of dollars in government funds to help build the castle. Hall was bankrupt, and in 1982, El Cid Castle bowling alley, which took 20 years to build, closed after only one year of operation. Hall lost the building in order to settle a malpractice suit. Hall died in 2001. His son, Walter Eugene Hall, was convicted of child molestation and aggravated sexual assault in 2007.

== The Sunnyslope Rock Garden ==
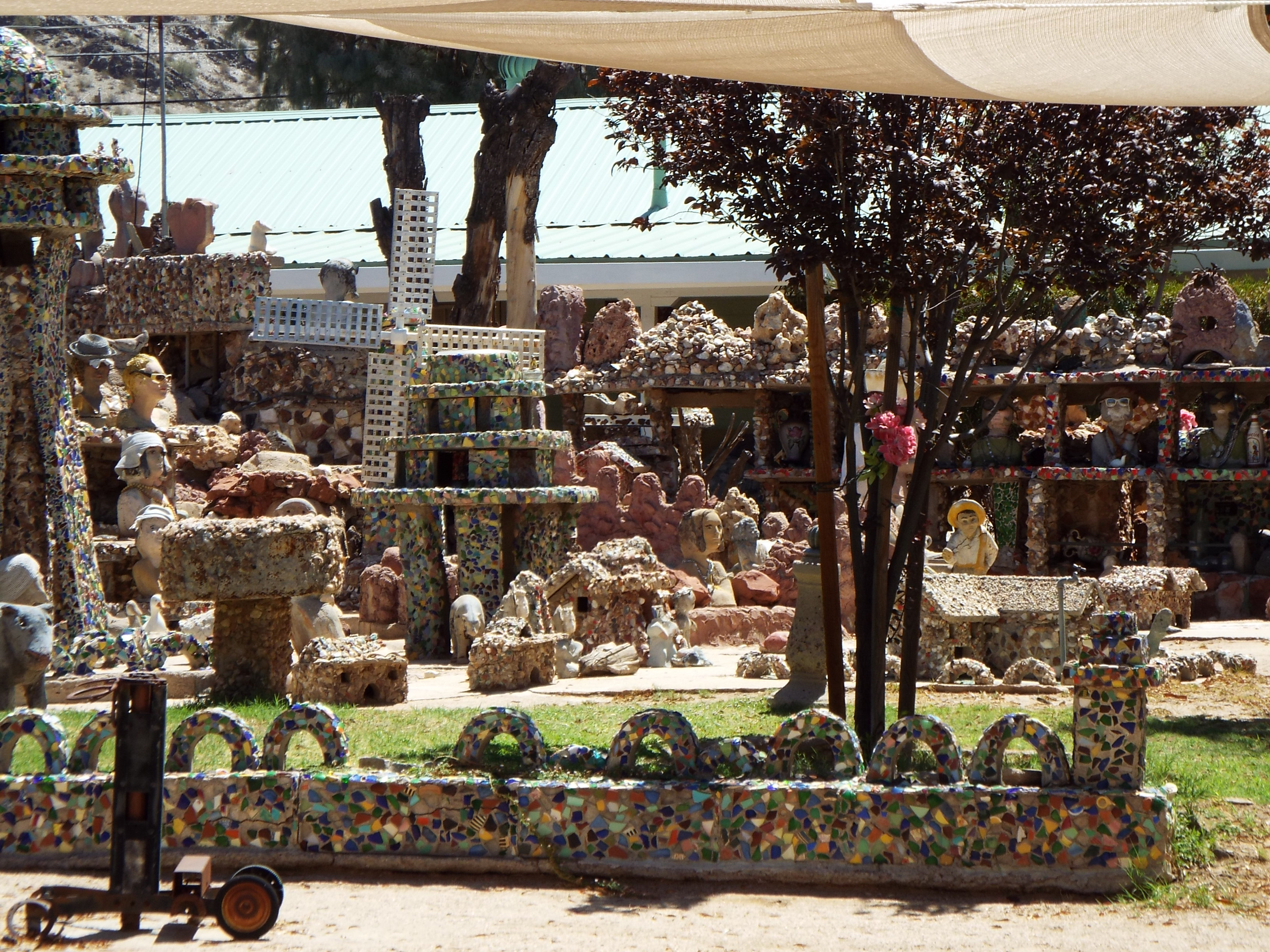
Thompson's art in the rock garden

The Sunnyslope Rock Garden was the creation of Grover Cleveland Thompson, a retired heavy-machinery operator, who moved to Sunnyslope in 1952. He purchased a property and had a house built on 13th Place (now 10023 N. 13th Place). Thompson began making his artistic creations using various objects, such as Halloween masks, as molds. Thompson died in 1976 and his residence and garden abandoned until 1979 when Marion Blake, a local teacher purchased it.

Thompson's creations have been documented and cataloged by the Smithsonian American Art Museum. Upon her retirement, Blake gave the garden to the University of Arizona.

== Microclimate ==
The Sunnyslope area has a known microclimate around the Royal Palm Park area at 15th Ave and Butler, where the temperatures can be 3-4 degrees cooler than other areas within Phoenix.

== Annexation ==
Sunnyslope attempted to be incorporated as its own town on four occasions but failed each time. In 1959, the City of Phoenix annexed the community of Sunnyslope along with many other valley areas. These areas eventually became part of the City of Phoenix, but Sunnyslope has always retained its identity.

== Today ==
The population of Sunnyslope represents the most diverse socio-economic neighborhoods of Phoenix. Many of the wealthiest and most politically active persons (past mayors, councilmembers, and business leaders) in the valley and many of the most financially vulnerable in the Phoenix area live in Sunnyslope. John C. Lincoln Health Network, a two-hospital network of primary, specialty, ambulatory, and emergency care providers, grew out of the Desert Mission community medical center. (A 2013 merger with Scottsdale Healthcare resulted in the combined entity being known as HonorHealth by 2015.) John C. Lincoln Health Network is the largest employer of Sunnyslope and the surrounding neighborhoods. Desert Mission Services continues to meet the basic needs of the community through the Desert Mission Food Bank, the Desert Mission Children's Dental Clinic, Desert Mission's Marley House Behavioral Health Clinic, Lincoln Learning Center, a nationally accredited child development and learning facility, and Desert Mission Neighborhood Renewal (a neighborhood-based Community Development Corporation).

In April 2011, Sunnyslope was the featured community for the Modern Phoenix Home Tour.

== Crime rates ==
In 2011, Sunnyslope zipcode 85021 had above average risks for automotive theft at 473, 211 for burglary, 167 for personal crime risk and 259 for property crime compared to 100 represented as the national average. Zip code 85020 had 358 for automotive theft, burglary 179, personal crime 170, and 222 for property crime.

== Home prices ==
The median home cost in Sunnyslope area zip code 85021 is $172,200 and in 85020 (zip 85020) is $173,900.

== Sunnyslope High School ==
Sunnyslope High School is located at 35 W. Dunlap Avenue, Phoenix 85021. In 1953 it became part of the Glendale Union High School District and enrolls nearly 2,000 students. Sunnsylope is part of the College Board's 2013 National Advanced Placement District of the Year and is regularly listed on U.S. News & World Report's Best High School Ranking list.

== Gallery of historic Sunnyslope ==
Historic Sunnyslope

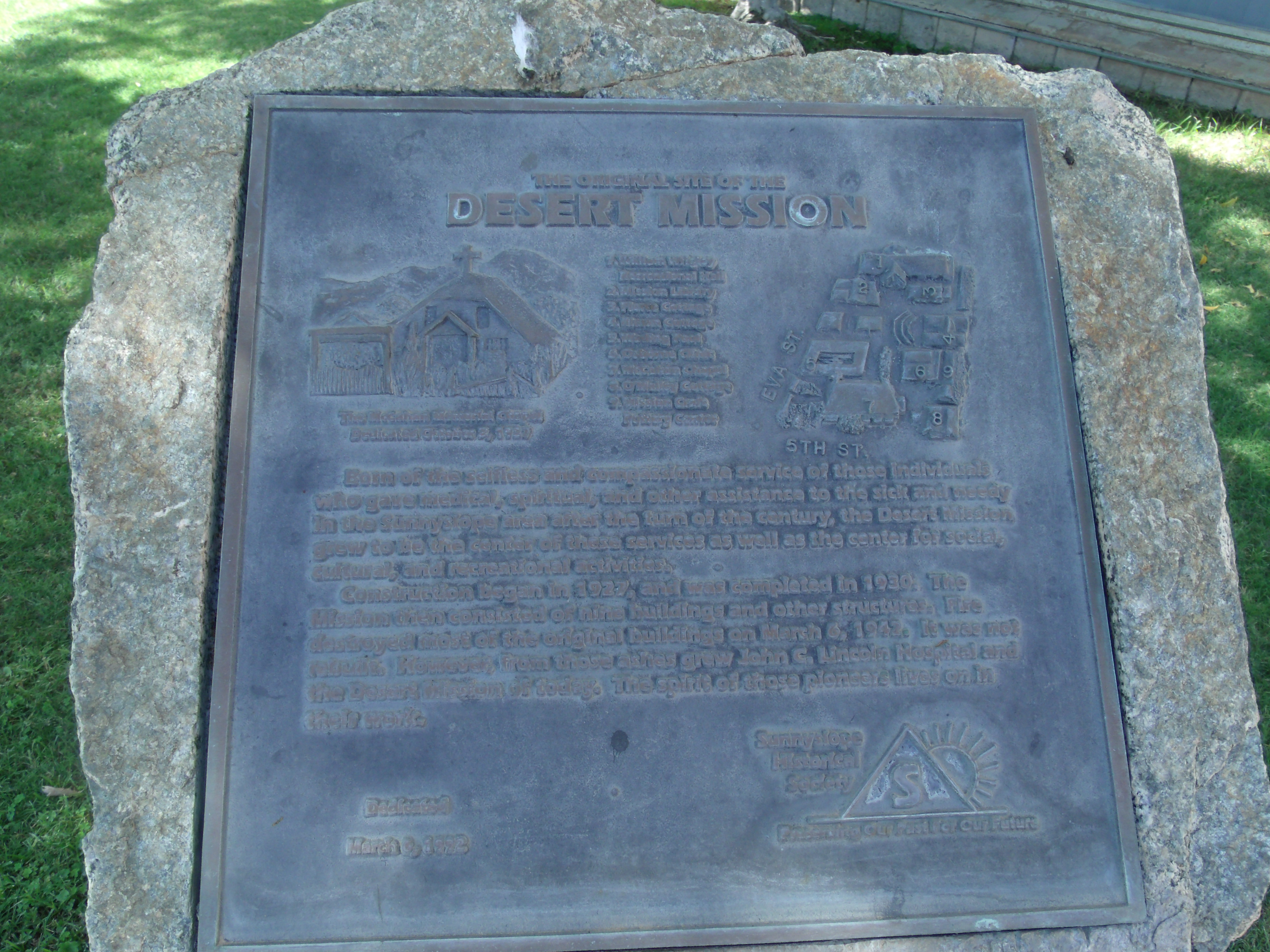
This plaque marks the site where the historic Desert Mission of Sunnyslope was founded in 1927.

(PHPR = Phoenix Historic Property Register)
(Sunnyslope Historical Society and Museum)
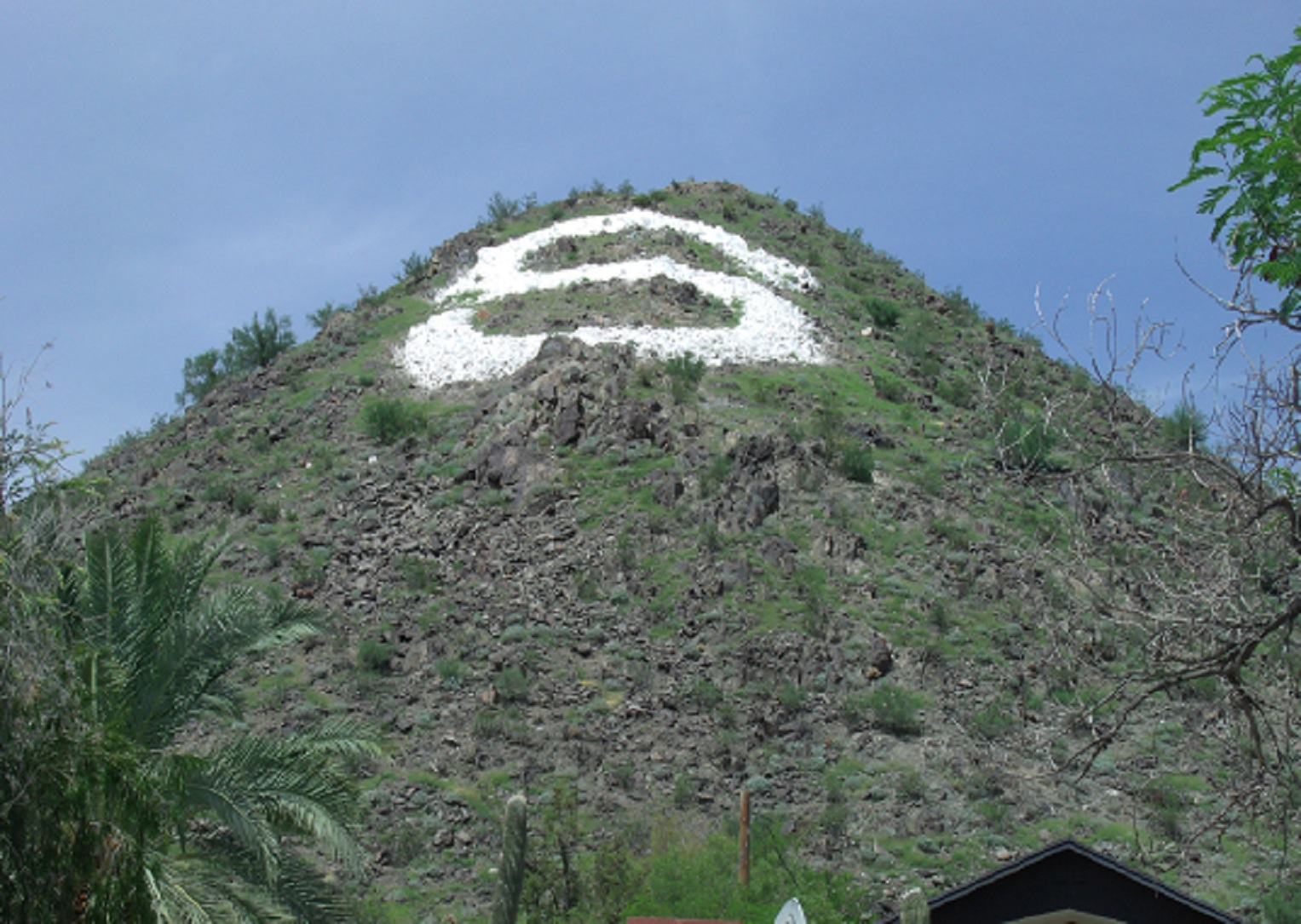
Sunnyslope Mountain, a.k.a. "S" Mountain. In December 1954, numerous students from Sunnyslope High School painted an "S" on the mountain which now is in the Phoenix Historic Property Register. It is located near Central Avenue and Hatcher Street.

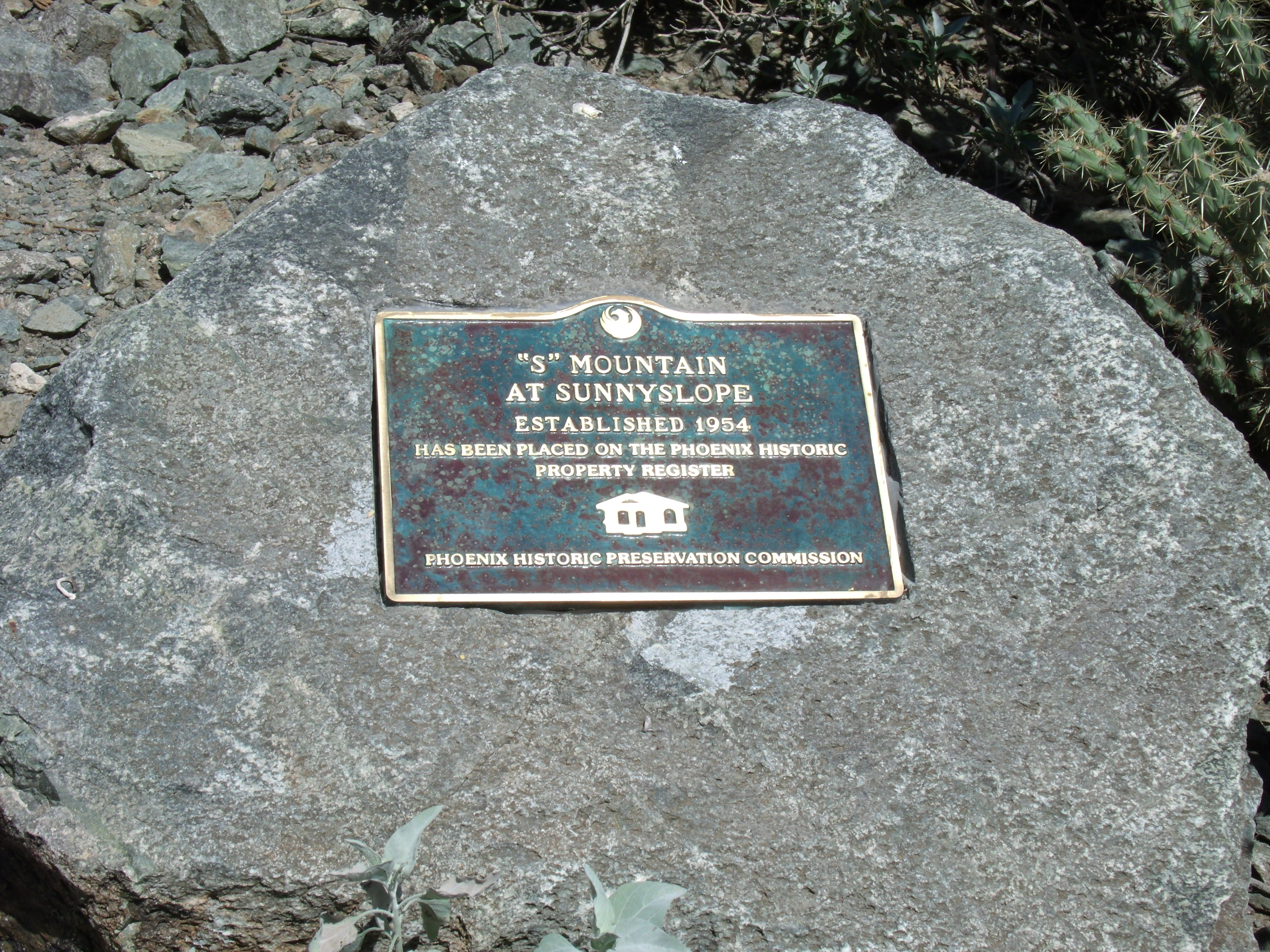
Starting point of the trail which leads to the "S" of the historic Sunnyslope Mountain.

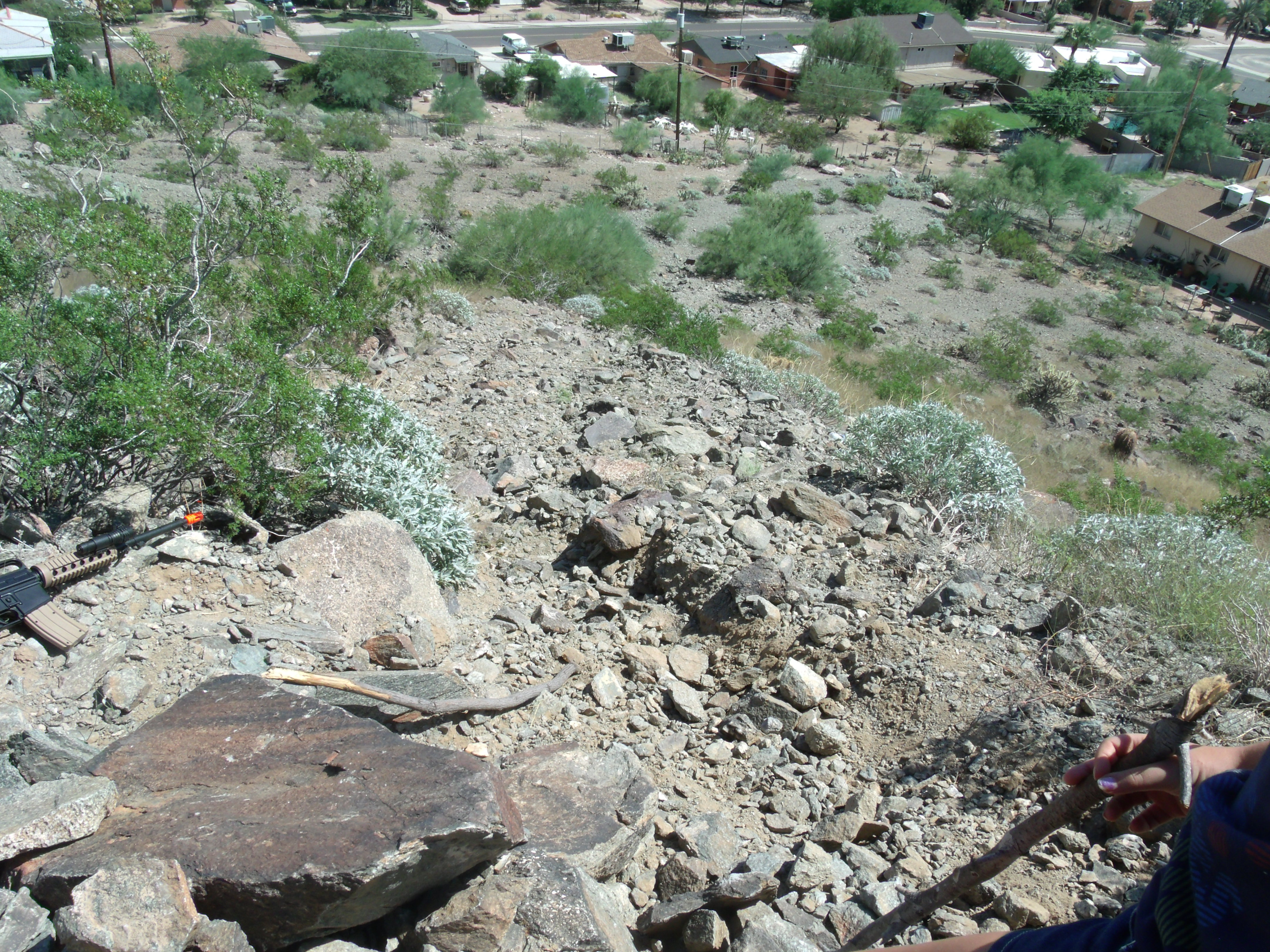
View from the trail that leads to the "S" of Sunnyslope Mountain.

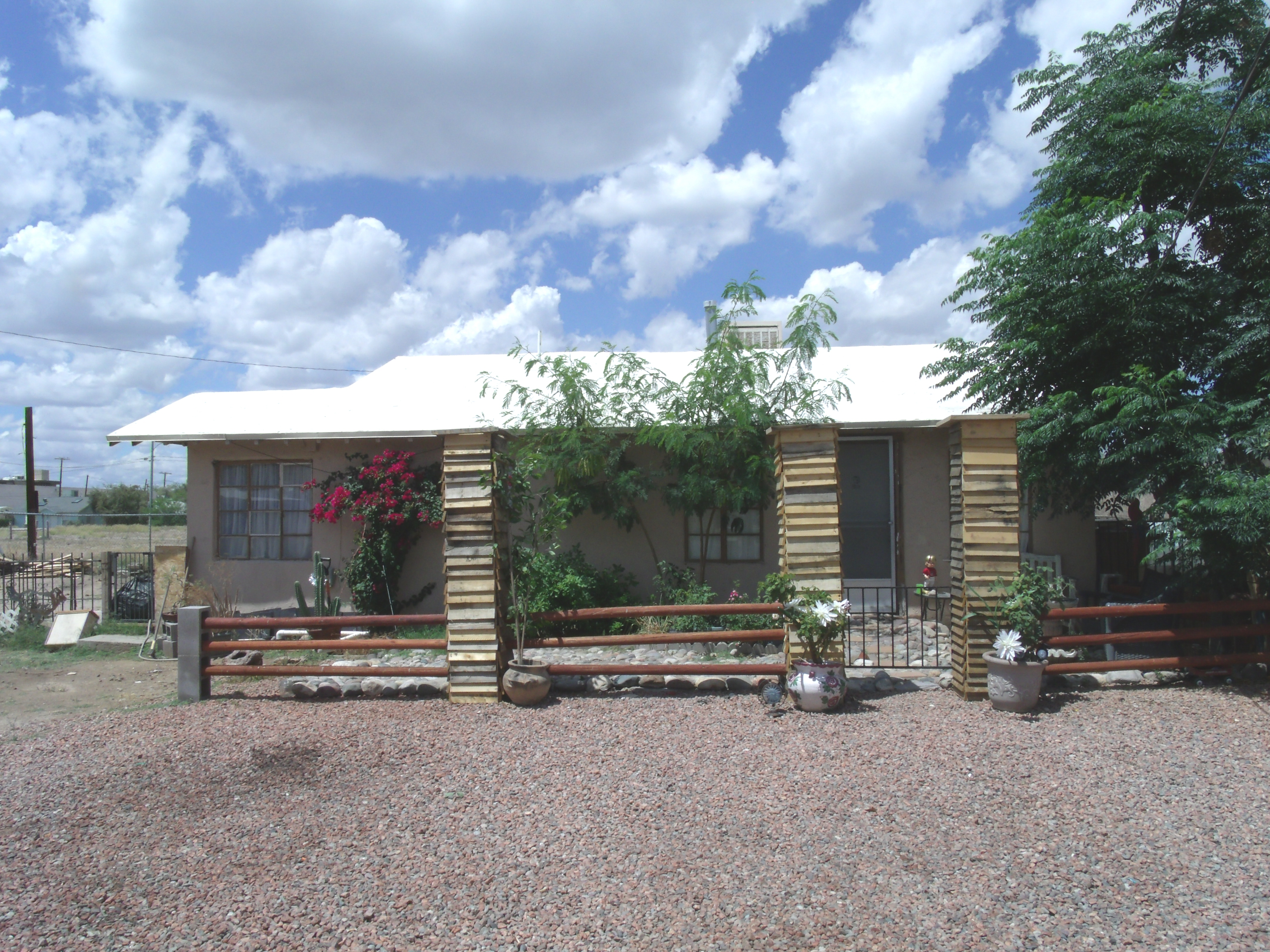
One of the low rent cabins in Beatty's Court on Ruth Street built in the 1930s. Elizabeth Beatty rented the cabins to families suffering from tuberculosis. Beatty was a retired secretary who moved to Sunnyslope in 1918. She inherited land between Ruth St. and Central Ave. where she established the low-rent cabins

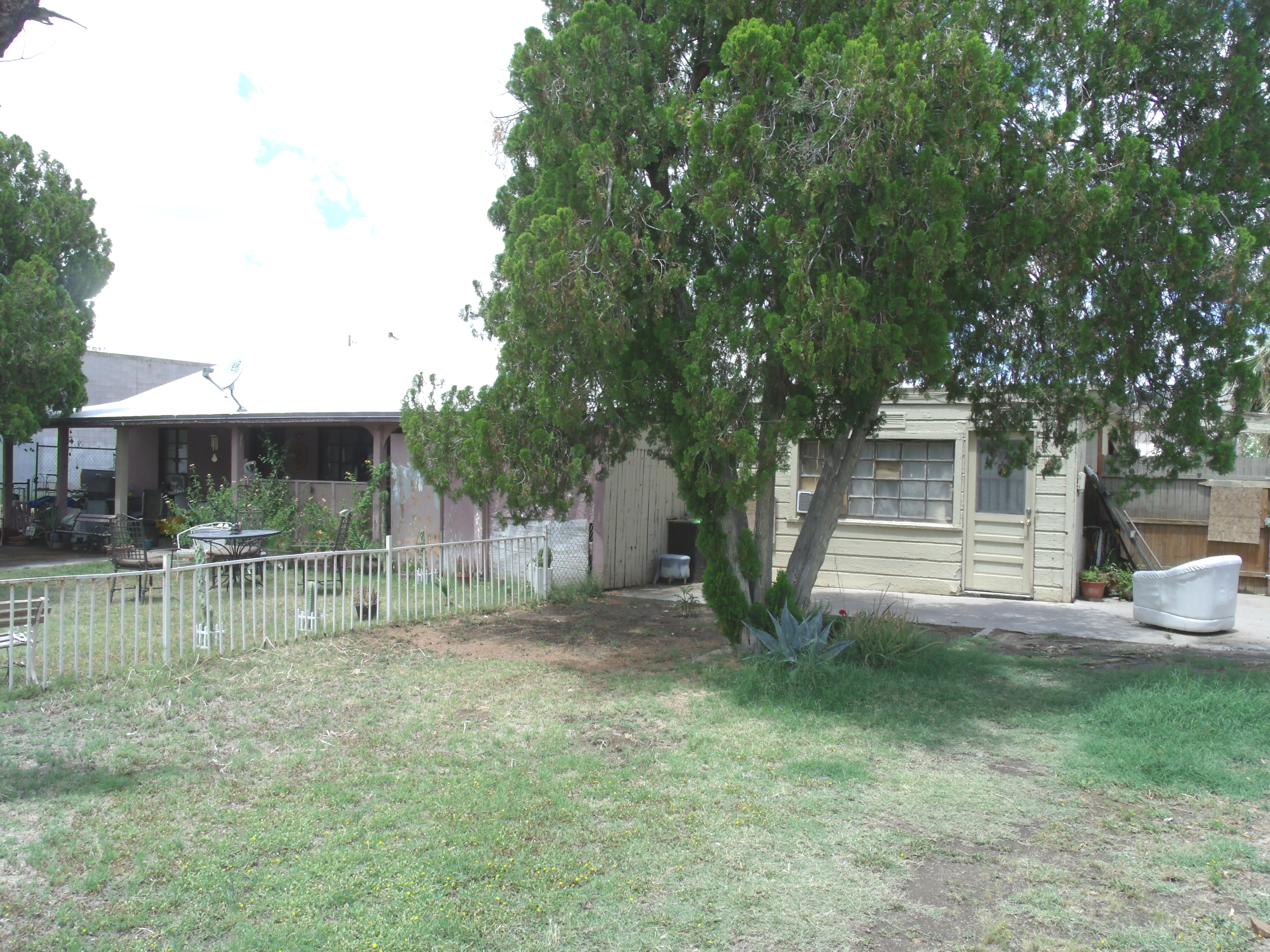
These Beatty's Court Cabins on Ruth Street were built in the 1930s and 40s.

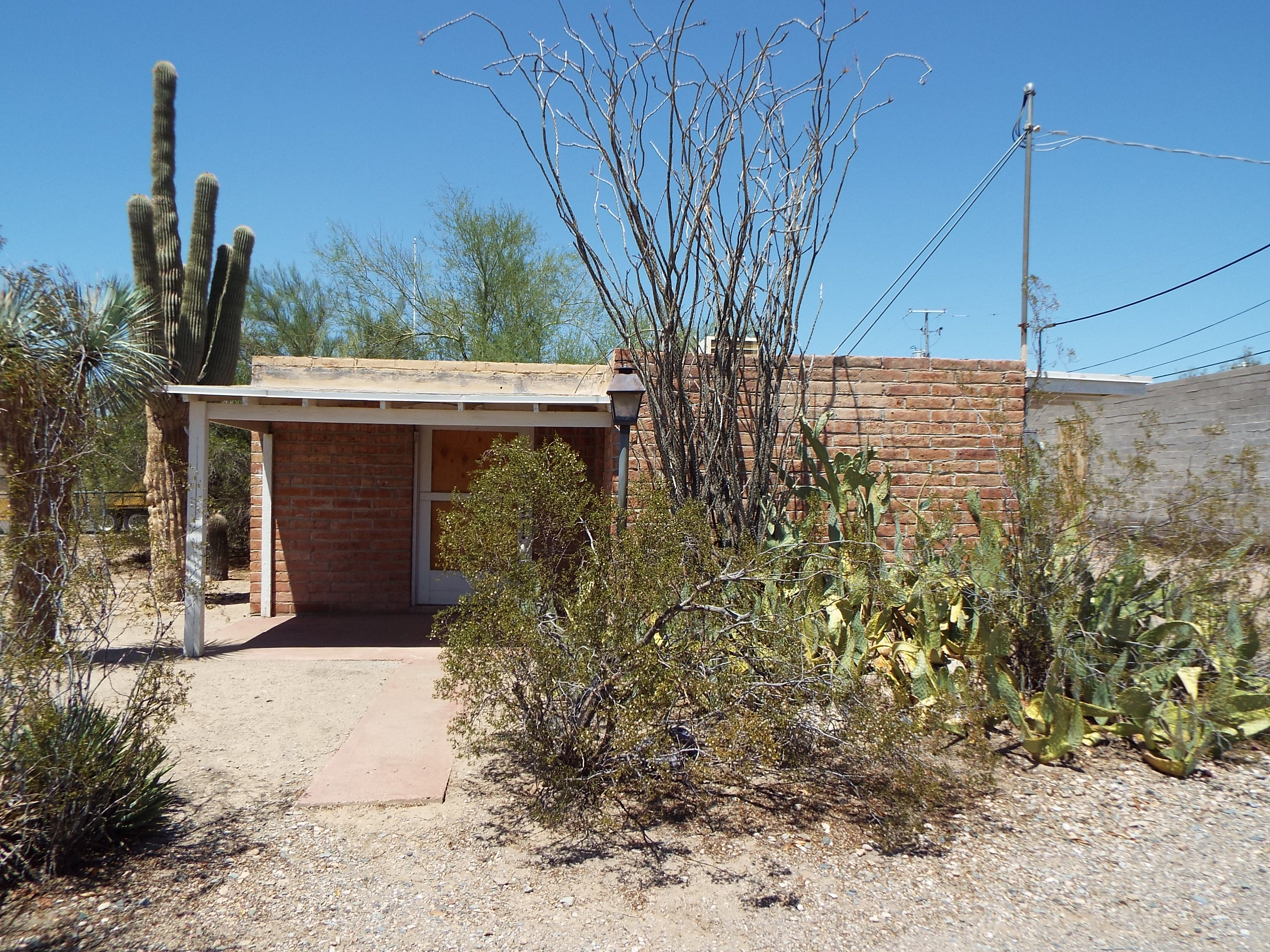
The Sage Press Building was built in 1935 and is located at 1457 E. Peoria Ave. (corner of Cave Creek Road). Sage was Sunnyslope's first newspaper.

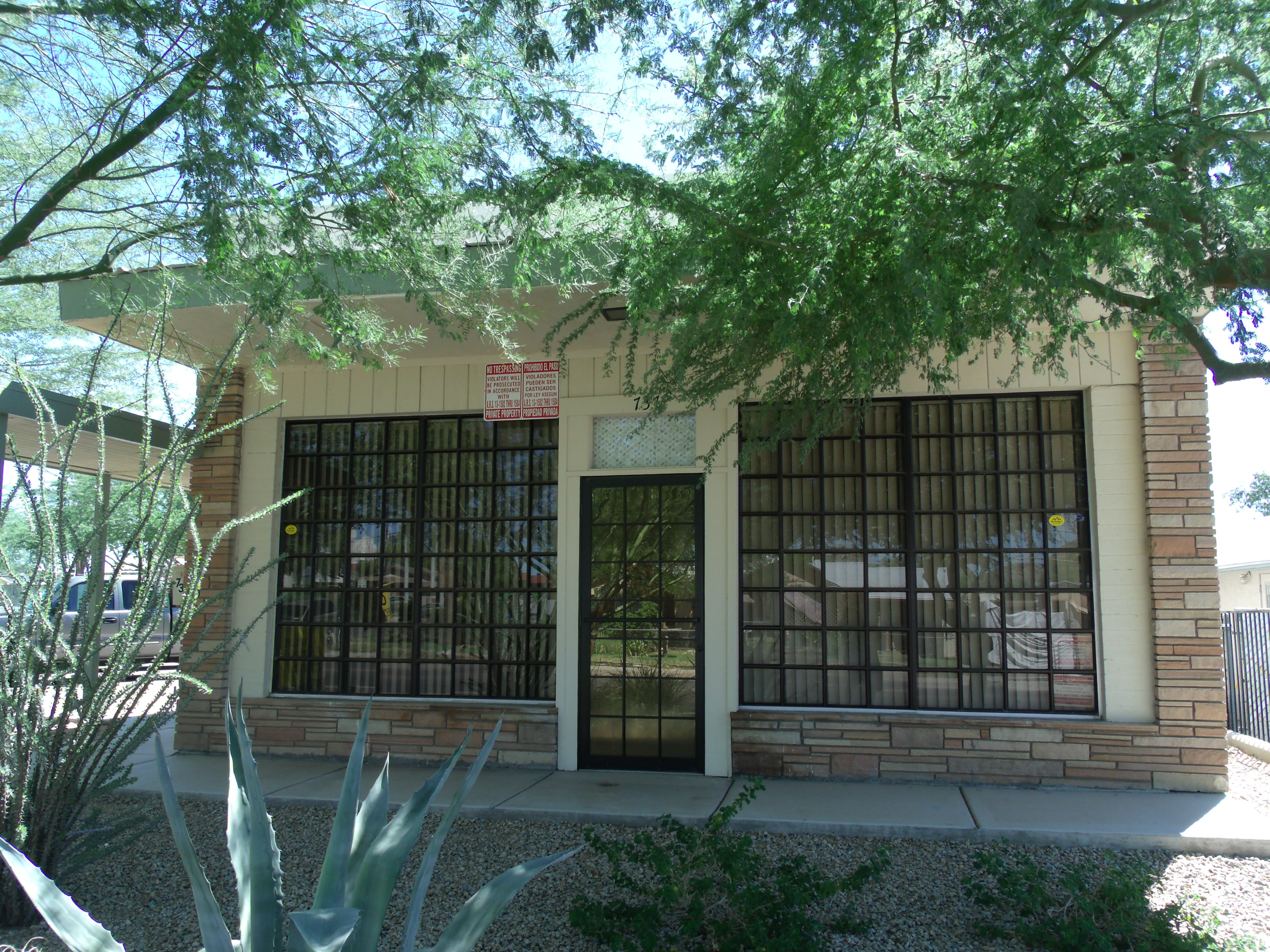
This historic building once housed Peoples Drug Store. This structure was built c. 1940s at 111 East Dunlap Ave. Pharmacist Bob Rice established his pharmacy there and in 1953 installed what was the first pharmacy drive through window in Arizona and the fifth in the United States. The building was moved in 1999 to 737 E. Hatcher Road, its current location, and is the home of the Sunnyslope Historical Society and Museum.

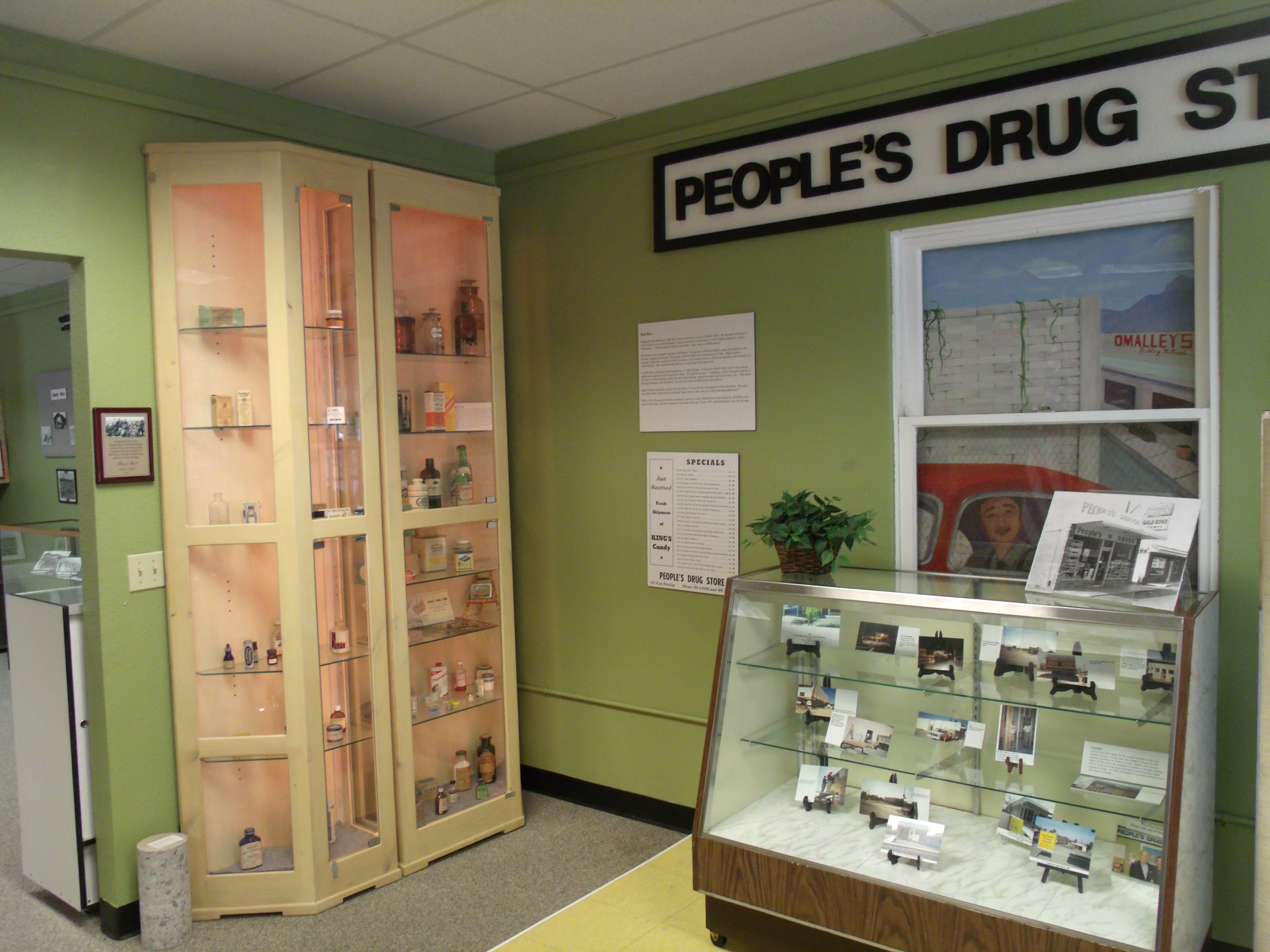
A display of pharmacy equipment is among the many displays in the Sunnyslope Historical Society and Museum. The Sunnyslope Historical Society and Museum are housed in what once was the historic Peoples Drug Store building.

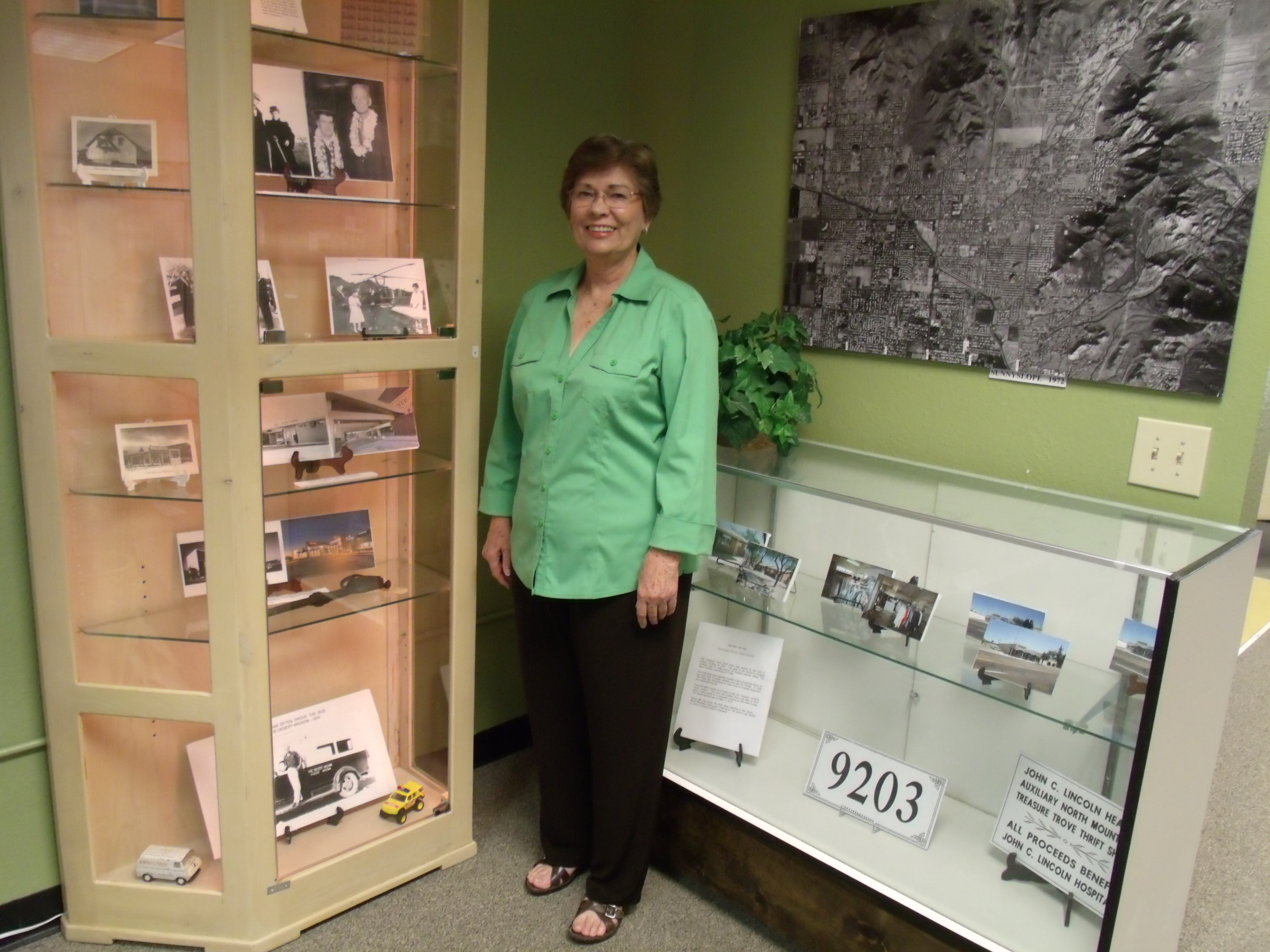
Dorothy Gunderson, of the Sunnyslope Historical Society and Museum, poses in front of the John C. Lincoln display in the historical building which once housed the Peoples Drug Store.

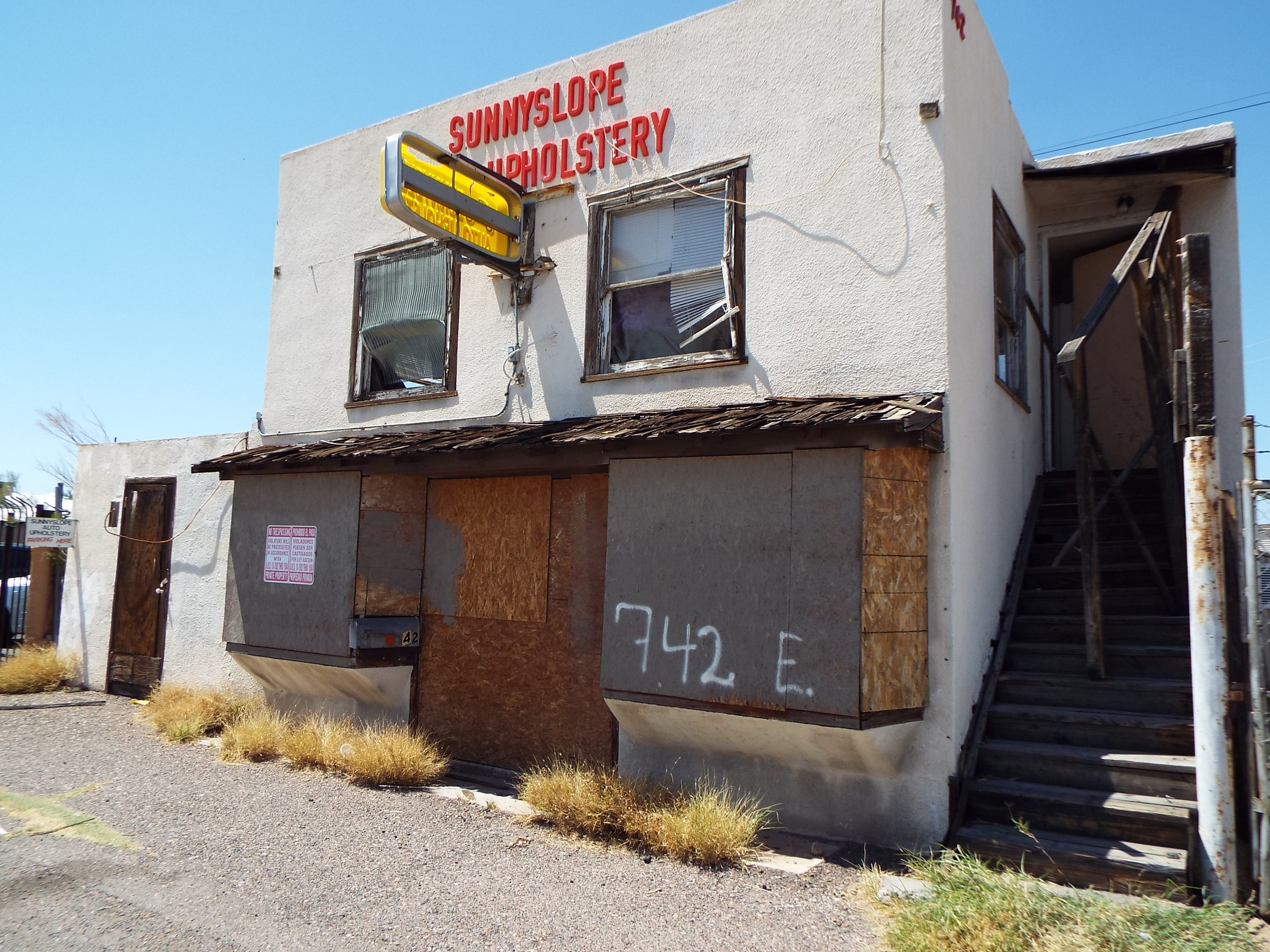
The abandoned Sunnyslope Auto Upholstery Building, located at 742 E. Dunlap Ave., was built in 1940.

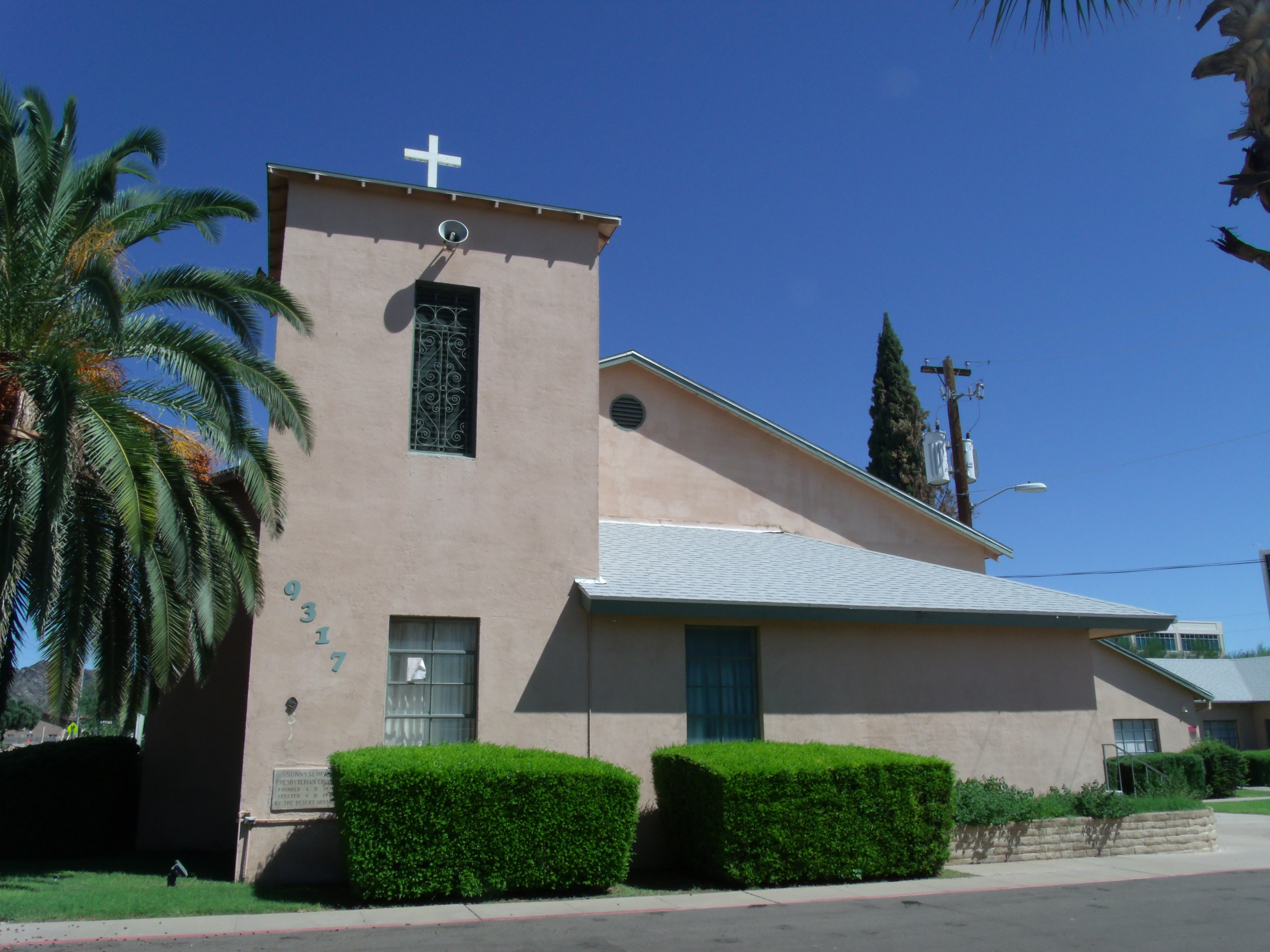
The Sunnyslope Presbyterian Church was founded in 1927 in Sunnyslope. The historic structure was built in 1949. It is located at 9317 N 2nd Street, in Sunnyslope.

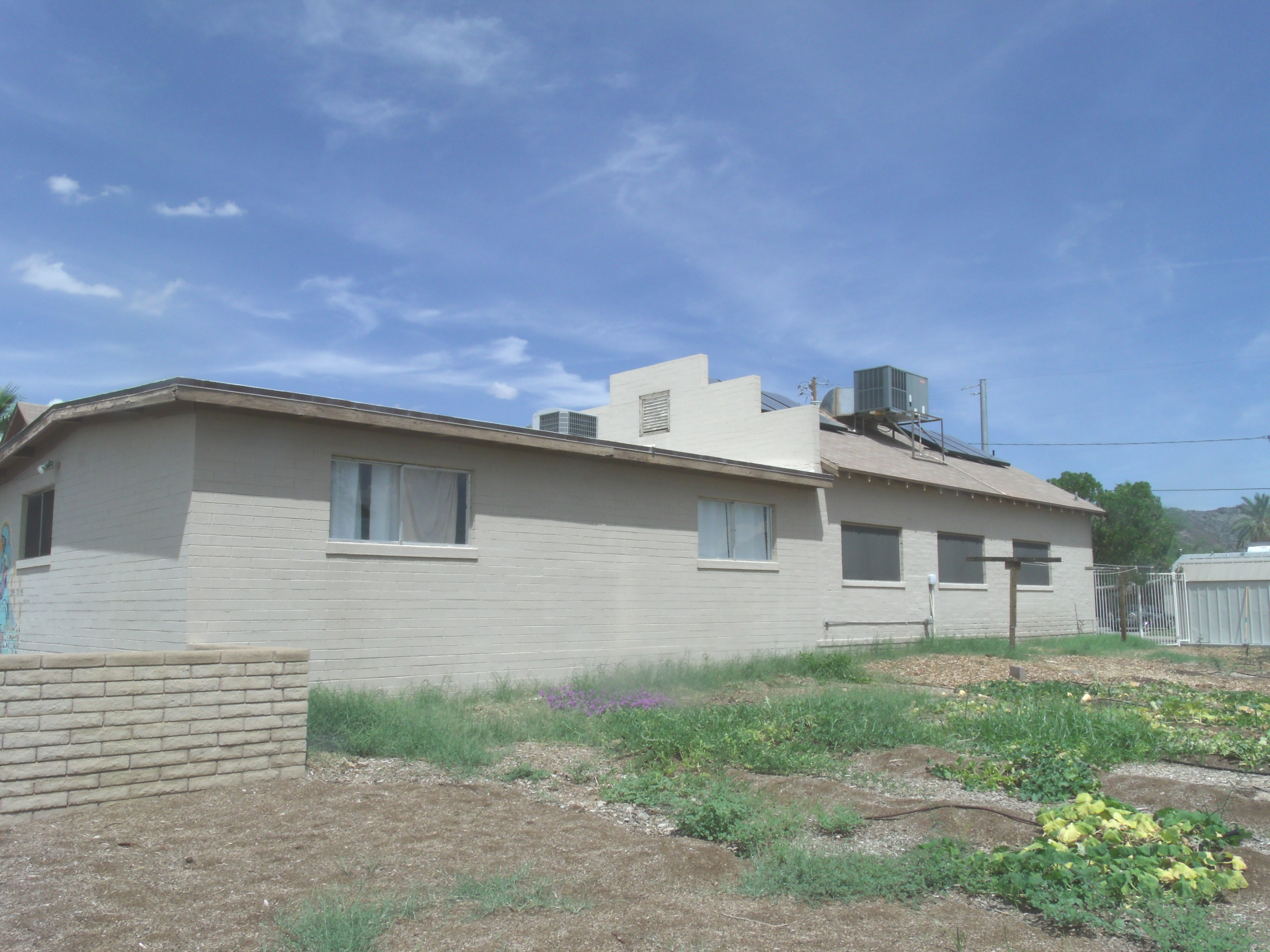
The Mennonite Church Meetinghouse was built in 1946 on 9835 N. 7th Street, Phoenix, in what was then Sunnyslope an area which later became part of Phoenix. In 1949, a new church was erected beside it. The older building was then used as a Christian day school and Sunday school.

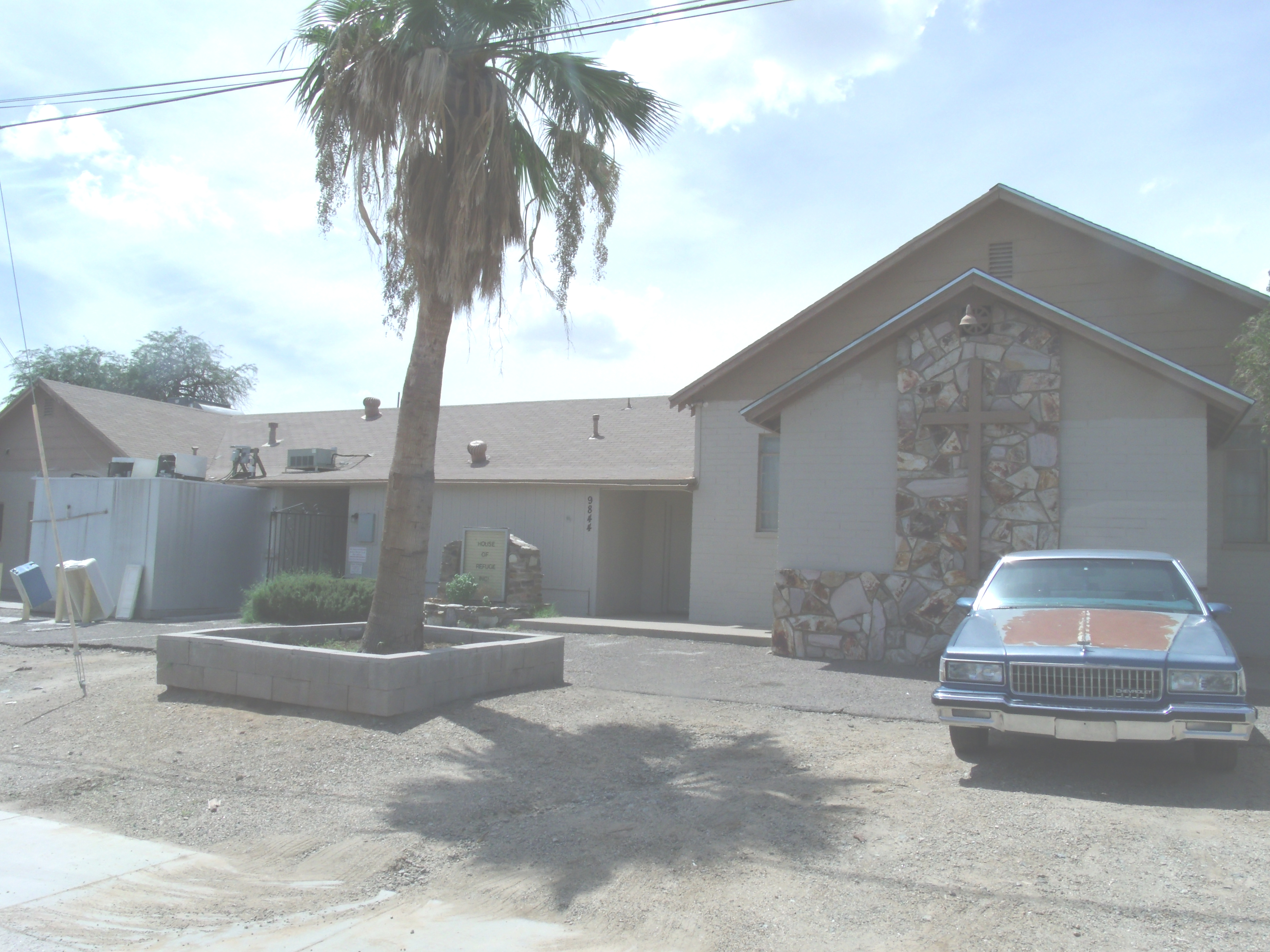
The First Mennonite Church of Sunnyslope was built in 1949 beside the older Mennonite Church Meetinghouse which was built in 1946. It is located at 9835 N. 7th Street, in the Sunnyslope section of Phoenix.

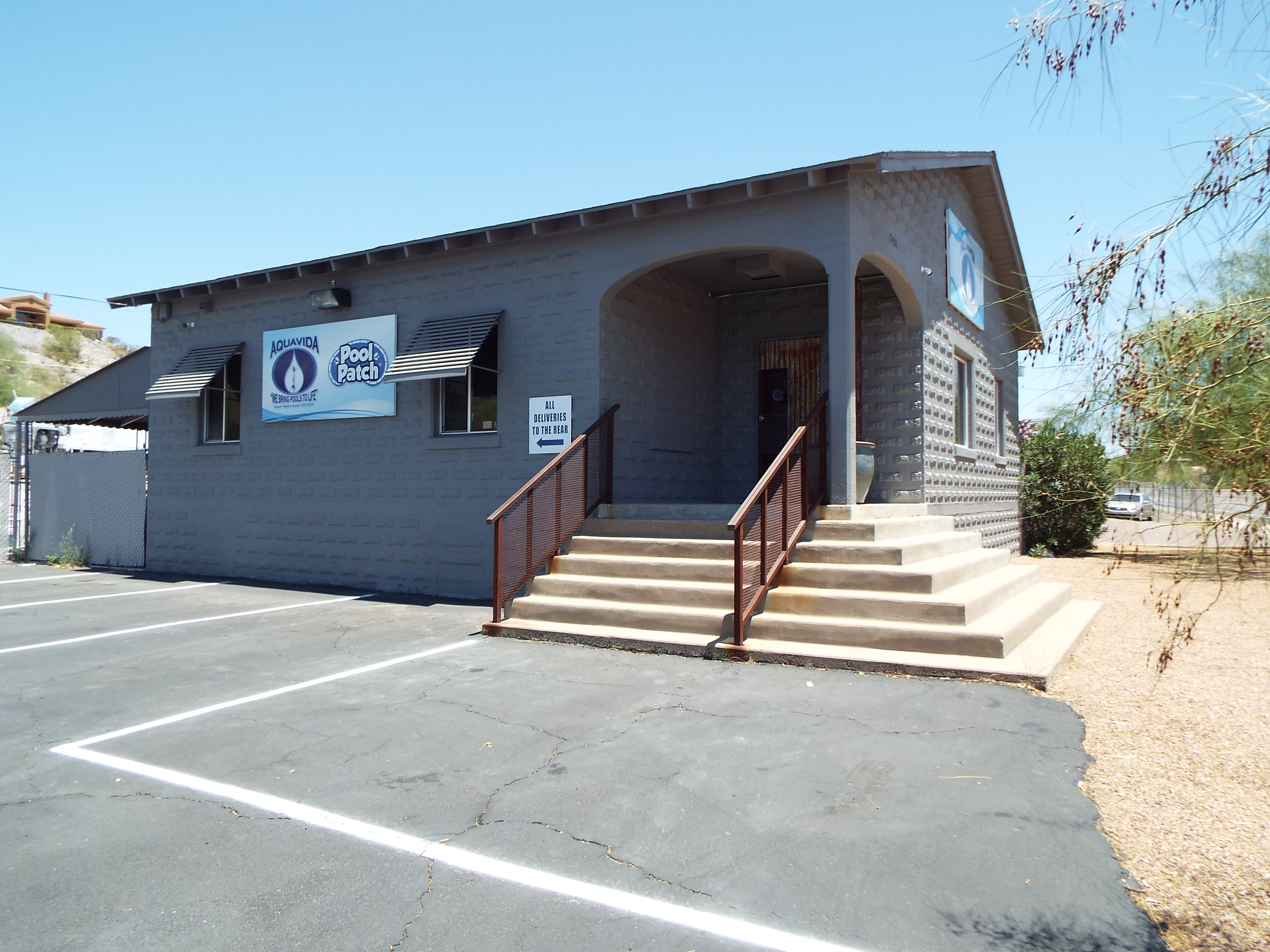
The Charles and Eleanor Abel House was built in 1955 and is located at 11430 Cave Creek Road. It was the first house in Sunnyslope with a bomb shelter which also served as a basement. The residence is now used for commercial purposes.

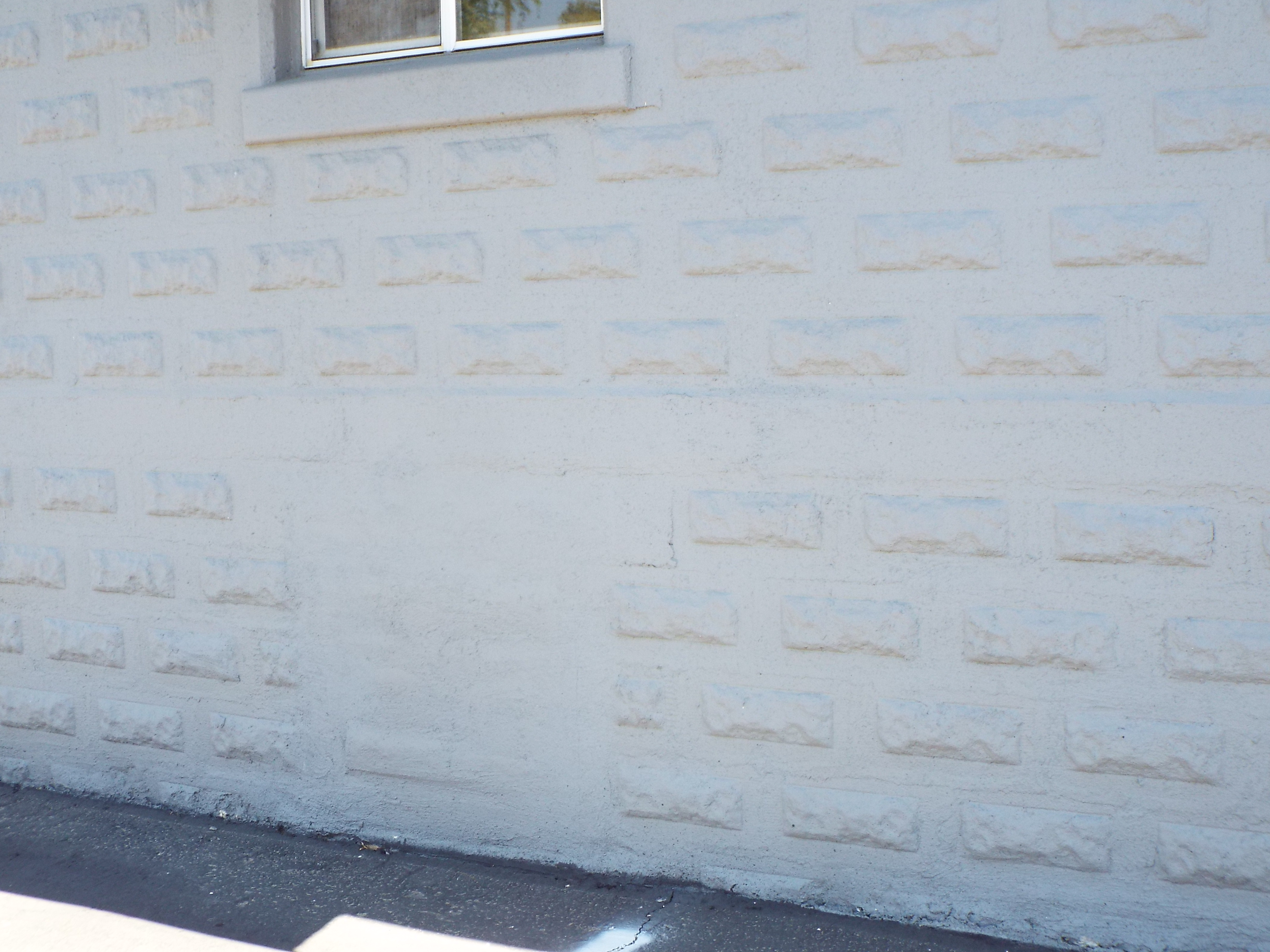
Location of one of the bomb shelter windows of the Charles and Eleanor Abel House which was covered up with cement.

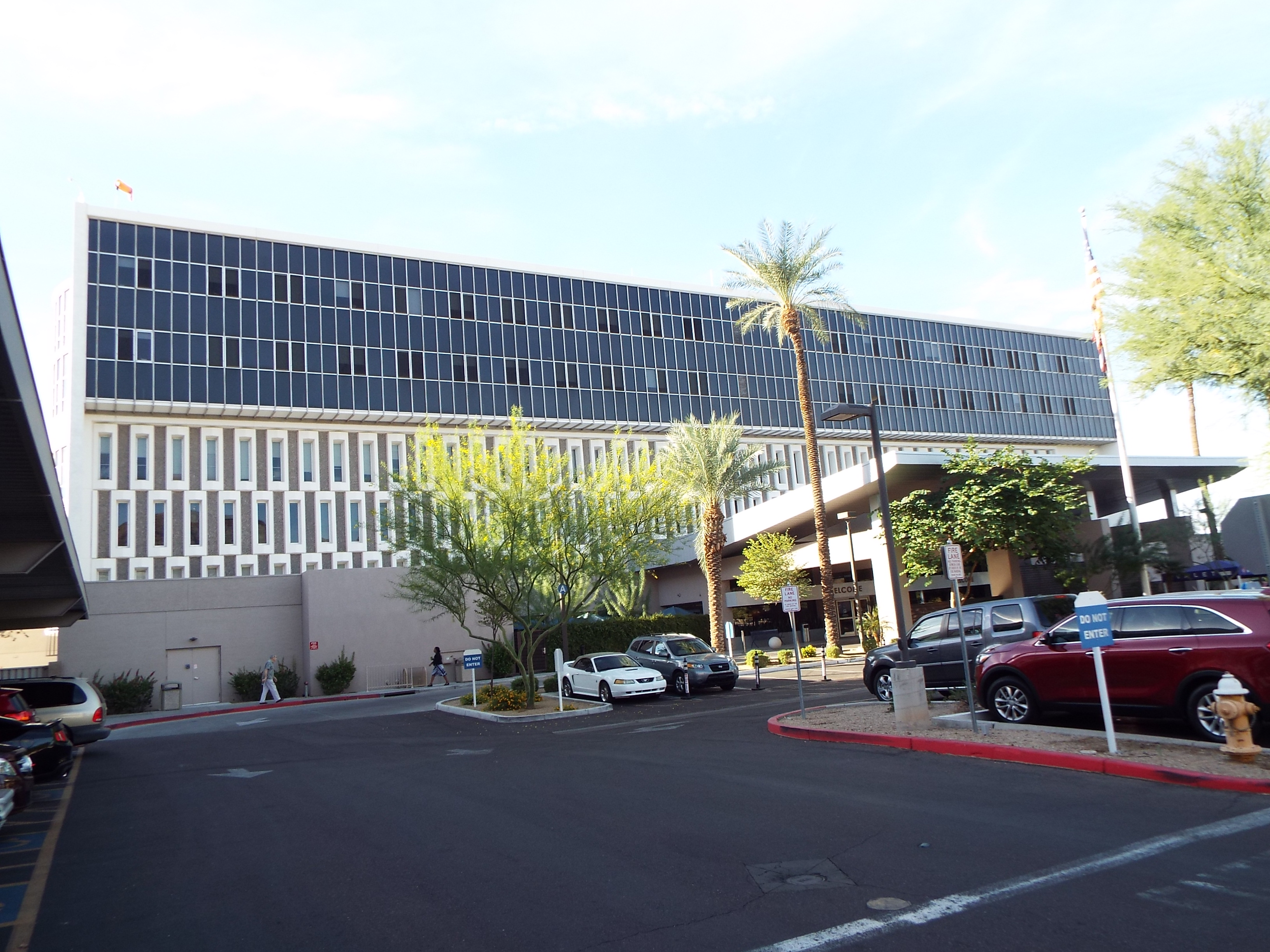
the John C. Lincoln Medical Center in Sunnyslope opened its doors in 1965.

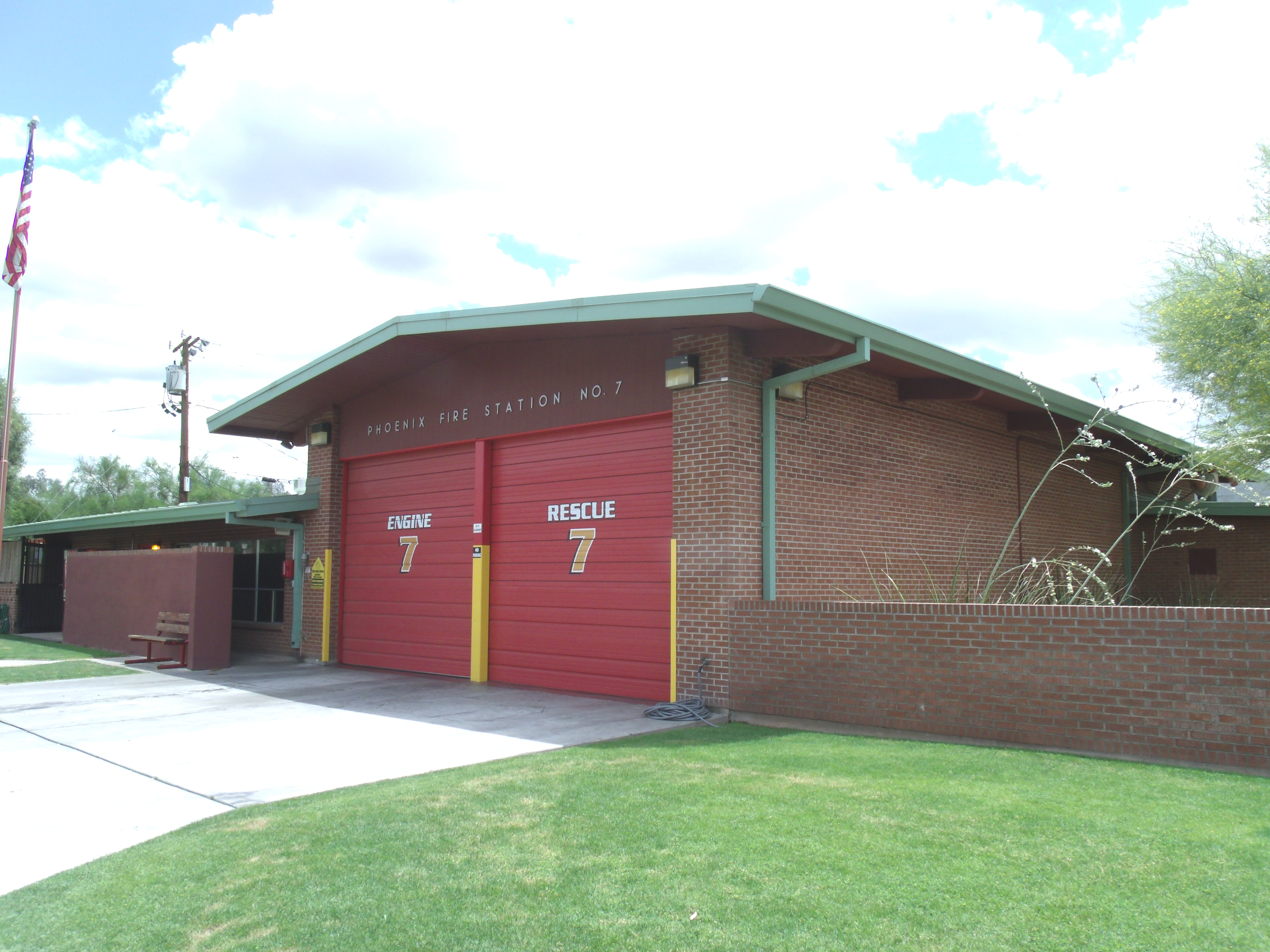
Phoenix Fire Station #7 was built in 1966 and is located at 403 E. Hatcher Rd. in the Sunnyslope District. The fire station is considered historic by the Sunnyslope Historic Society

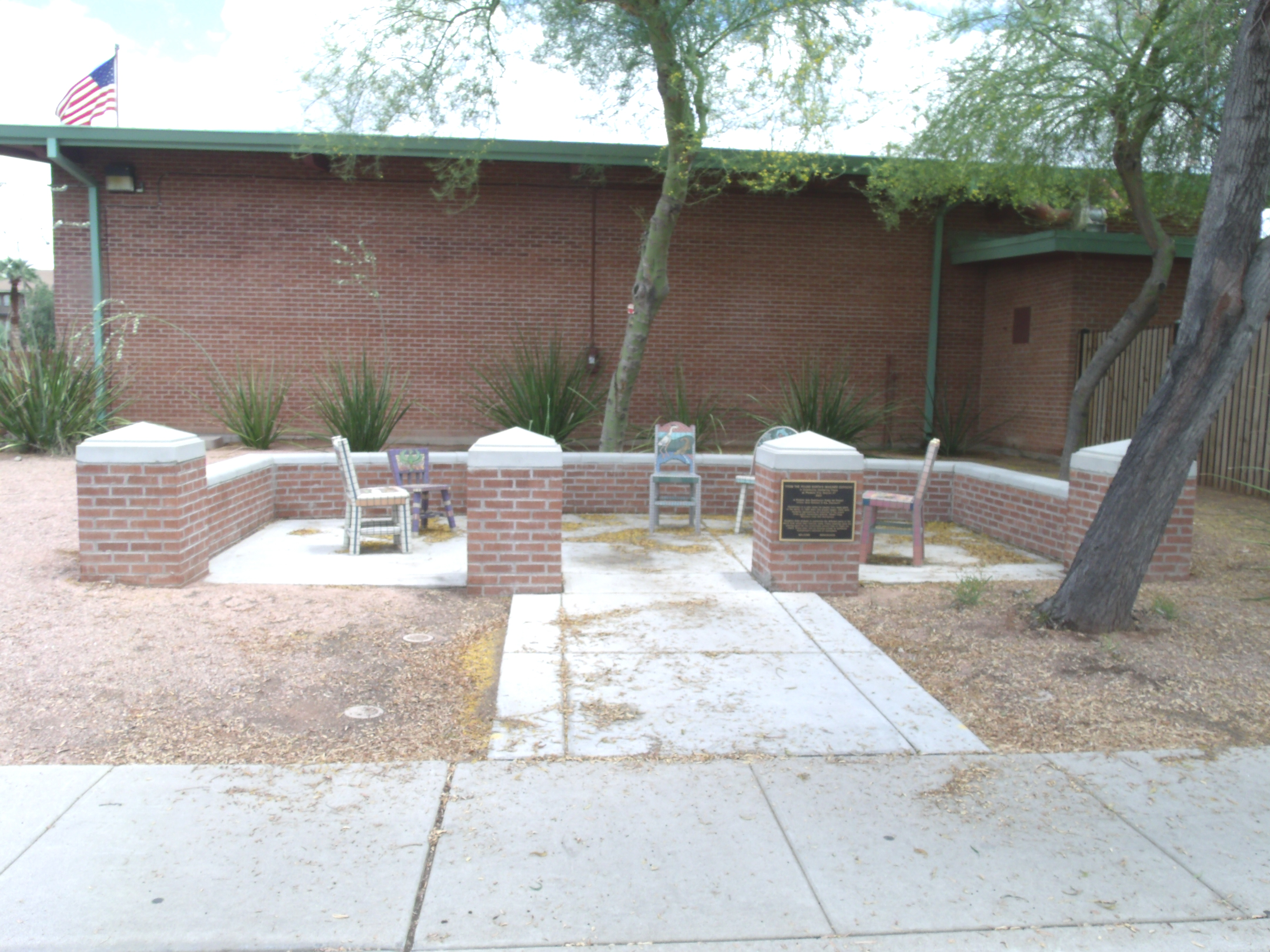
Area of the Phoenix Fire Station #7 located at 403 E. Hatcher Rd. which was dedicated to the people of Sunnyslope who used to gather and discuss issues regarding their community.
Historic Walter Leon Lovinggood House
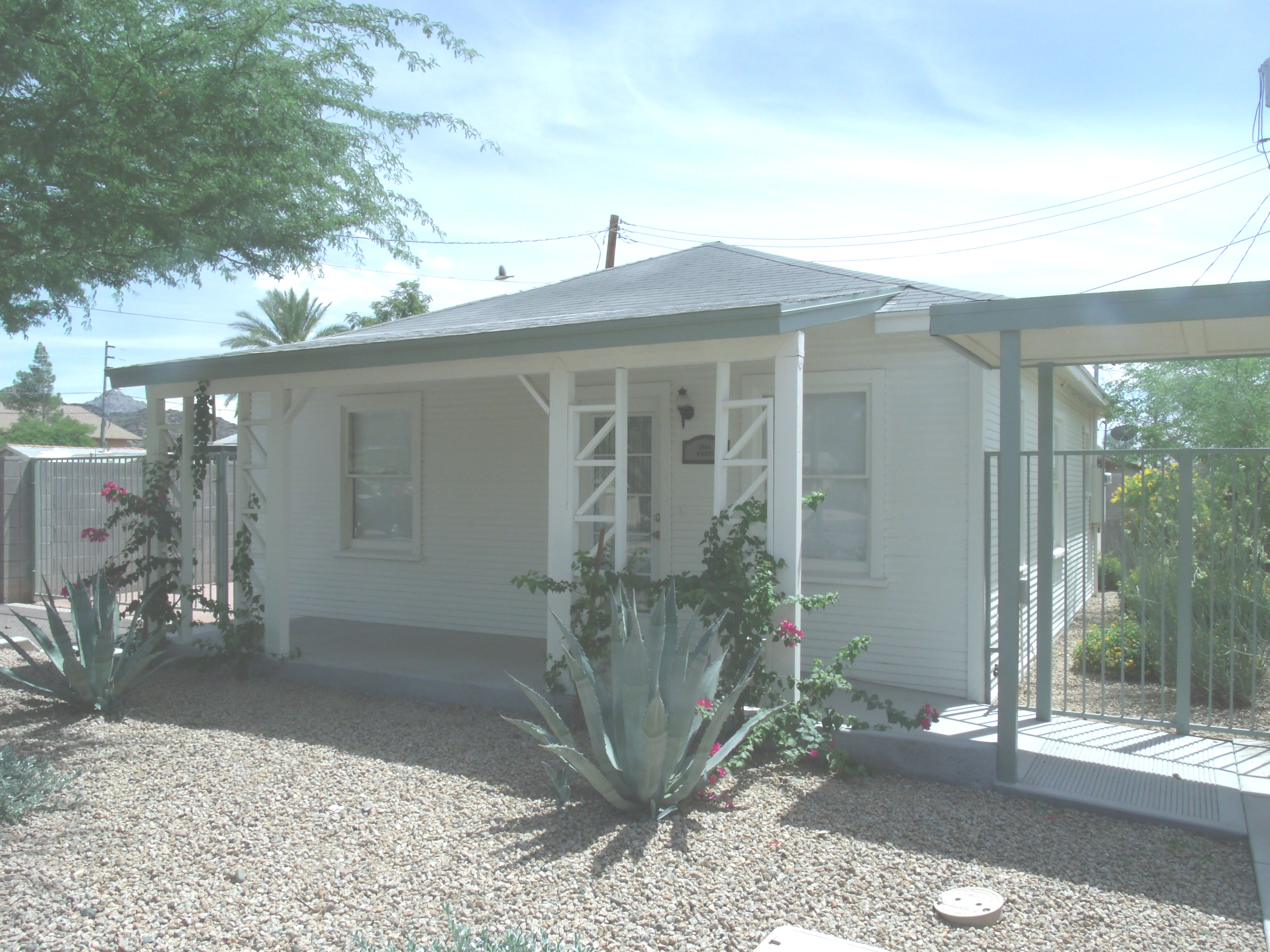
The Lovinggood House was built in 1945, by Walter Leon Lovinggood on a lot on 8924 2nd Street in the Sunnyslope Section of Phoenix. In 1999, the house became property of the Sunnyslope Historical Society which is located at 737 E. Hatcher Street.

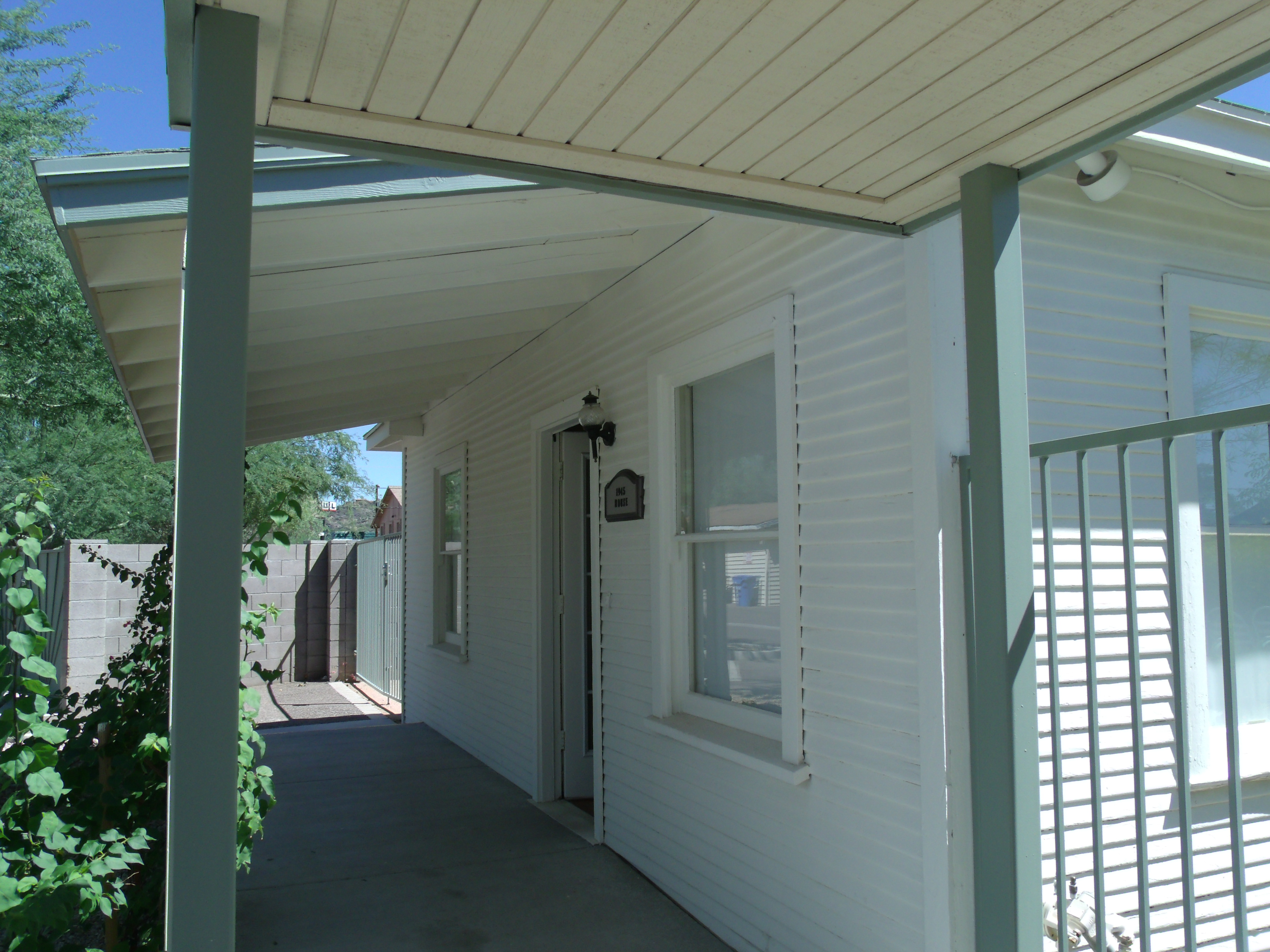
Different view of the 1945 Lovinggood House.

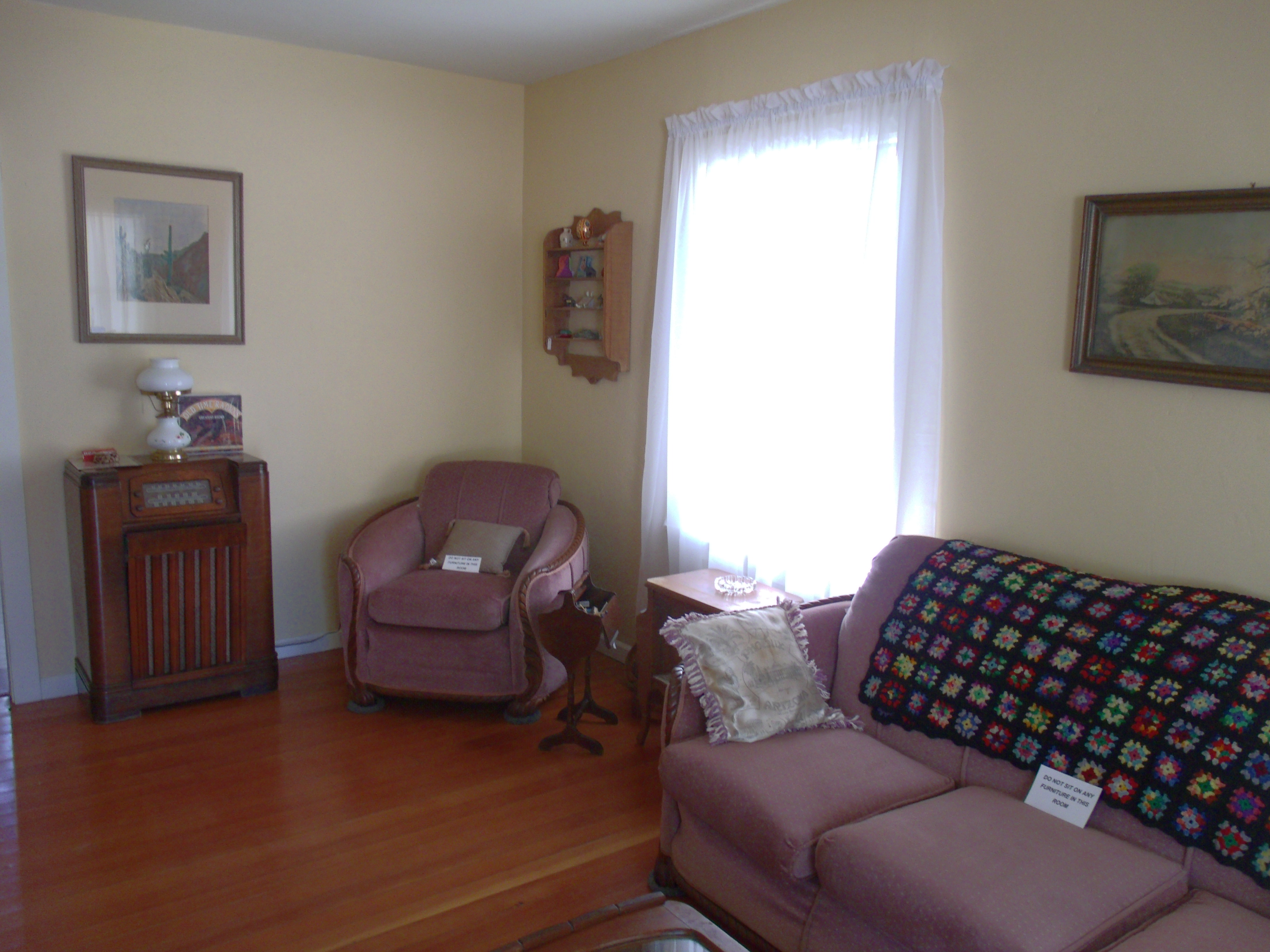
Inside the living room of the Lovinggood House.

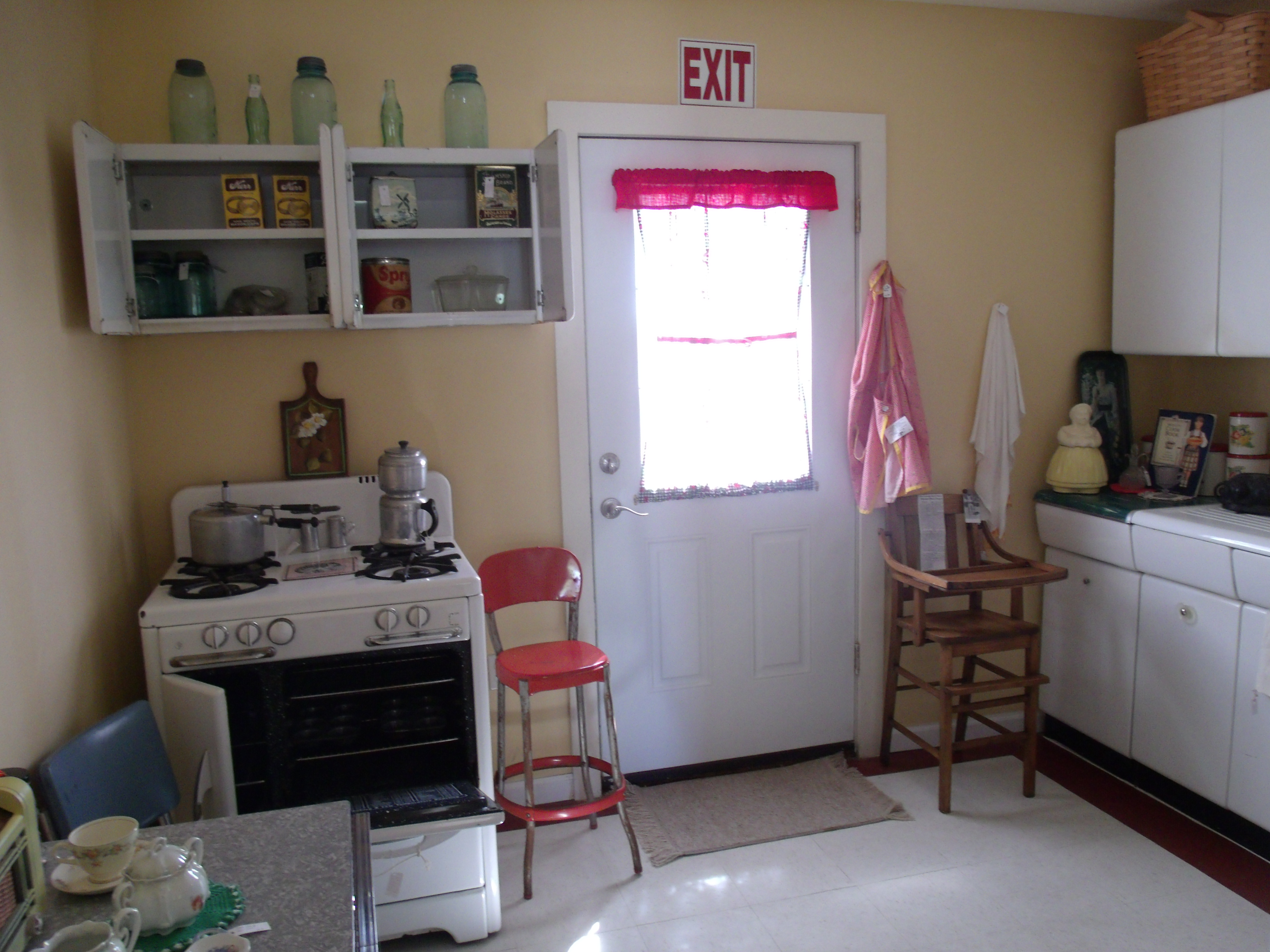
The kitchen of the Lovinggood House.

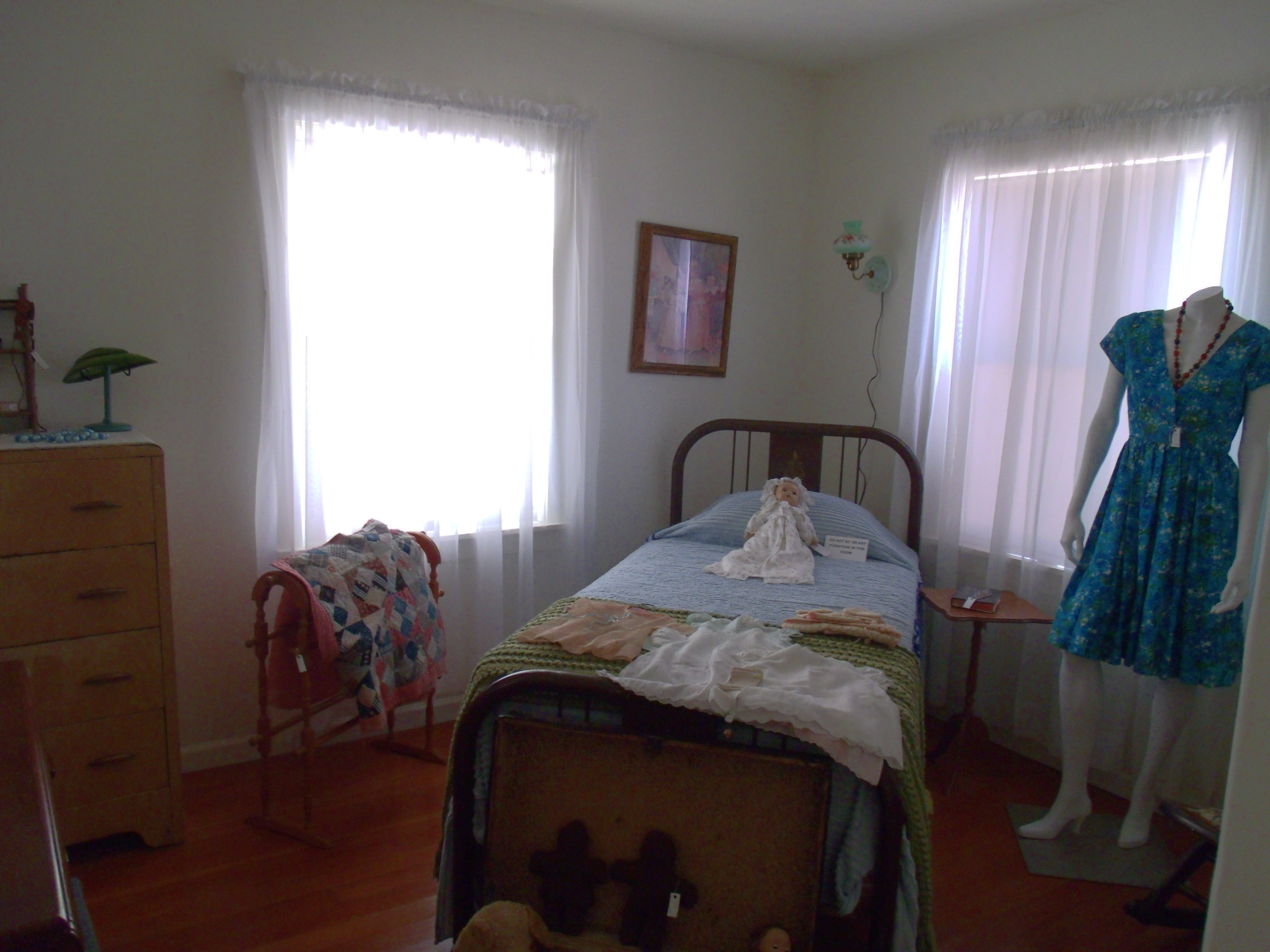
The bedroom of the Lovinggood House.
El Cid Castle
(Located on the opposite side of Sunnyslope's western boundary)
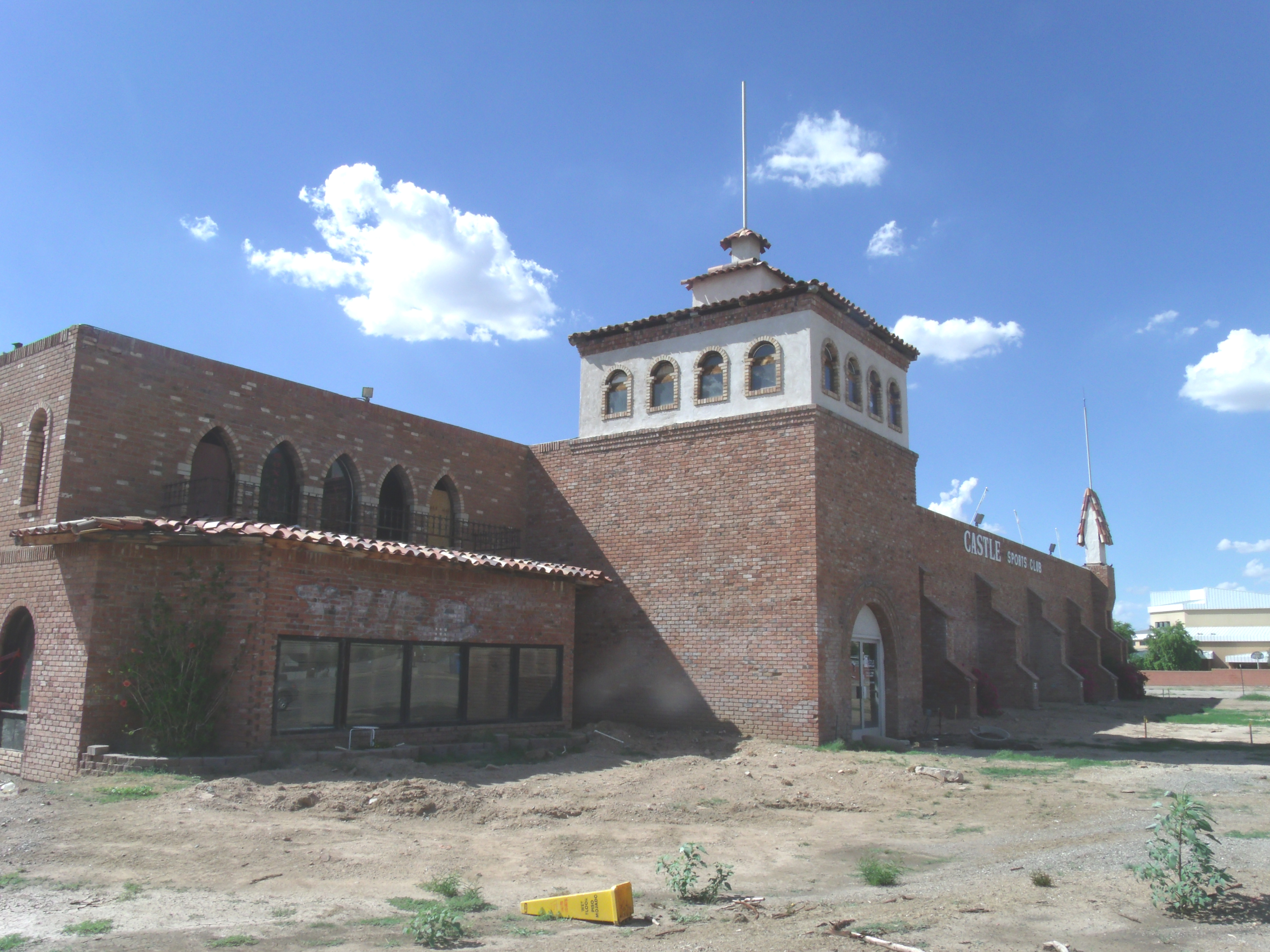
The historic El Cid Castle was a bowling alley which resembled a Moorish Castle. It was built by Dr. Kenneth Hall, a physician who served the community of Sunnyslope in Phoenix. Construction on the structure began in 1963 and was completed in 1980. It was located at the Northwest corner of 19th Ave and West Cholla Drive which is on the opposite side of Sunnyslope's western boundary.

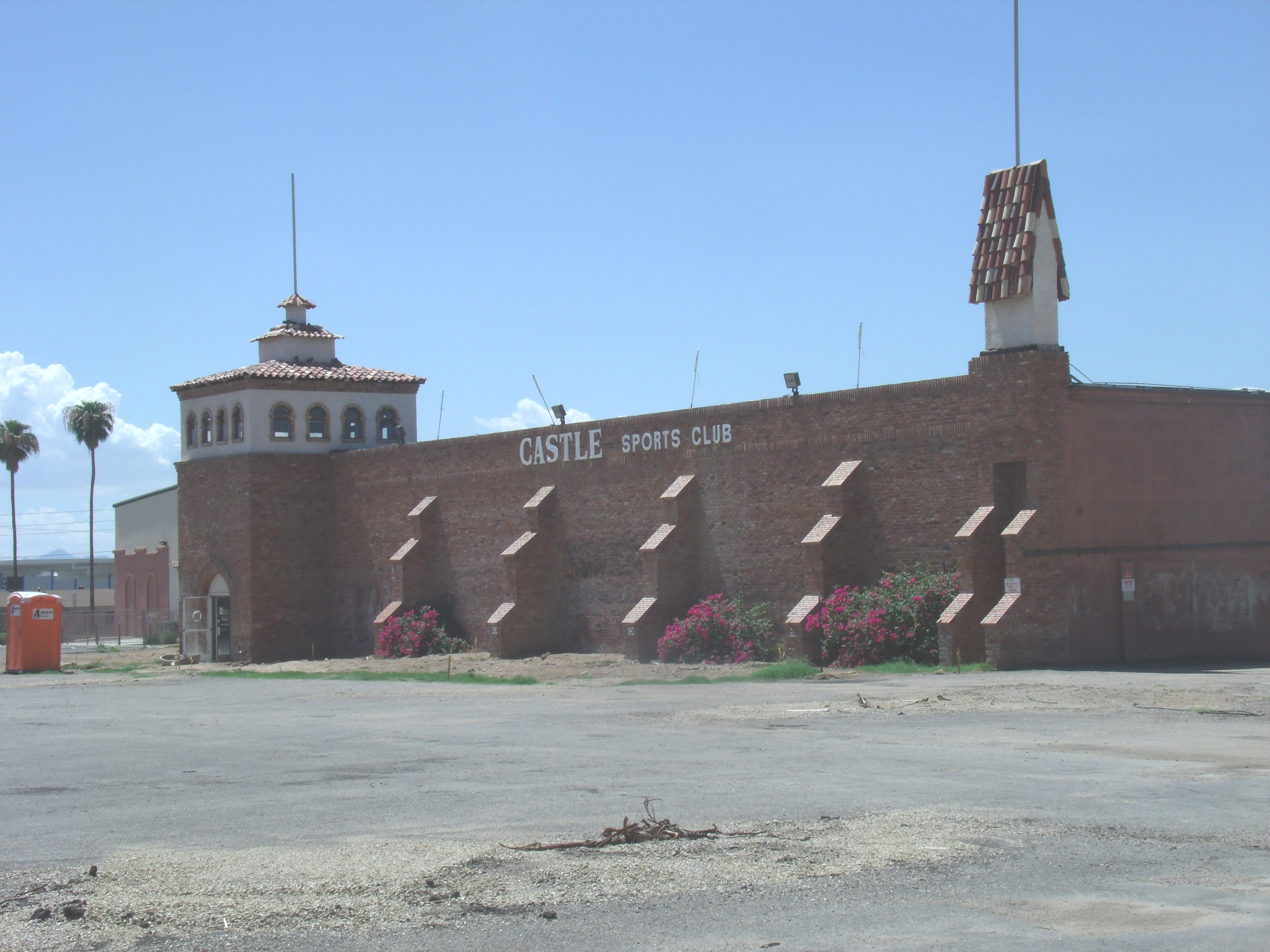
Different view of El Cid Castle.

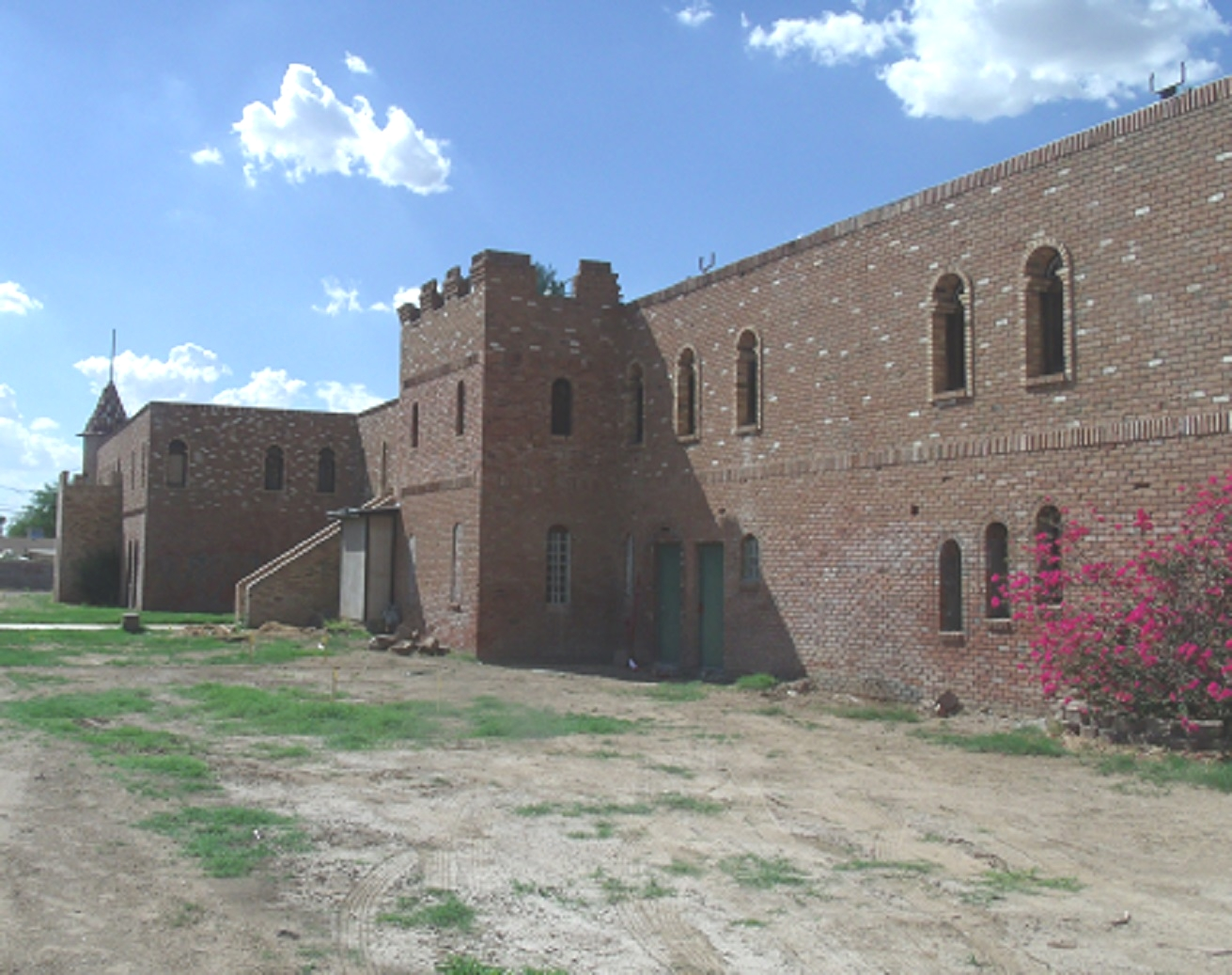
Side view of El Cid Castle. The castle was a bowling alley which resembled a Moorish castle.

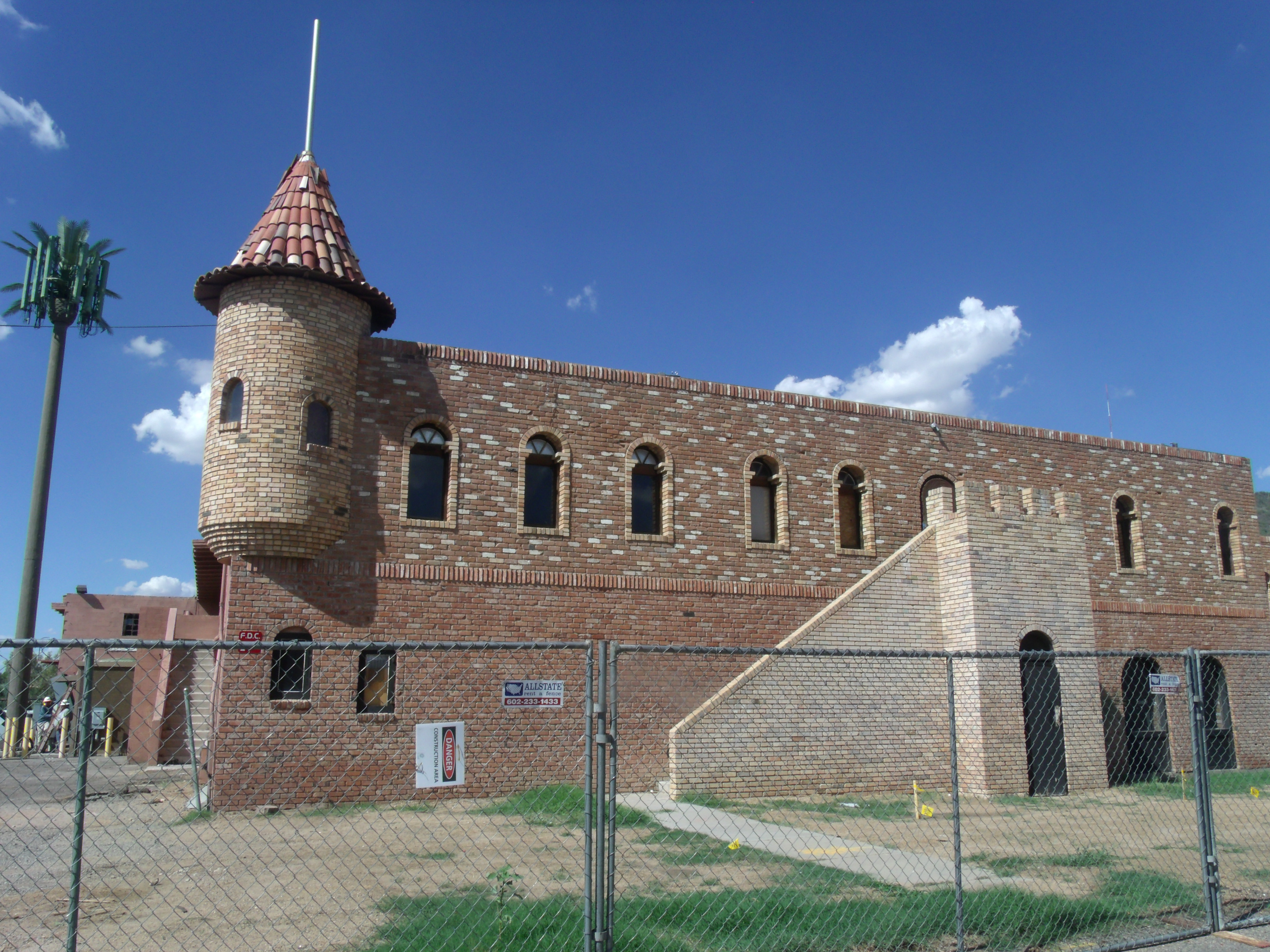
Different side view of El Cid Castle located at the Northwest corner of 19th Ave and West Cholla Drive in Phoenix. Restoration of the building was completed in 2014. In January 2015, it opened as an office of the Arizona Department of Eco nomic Security.
Sunnyslope Rock Garden
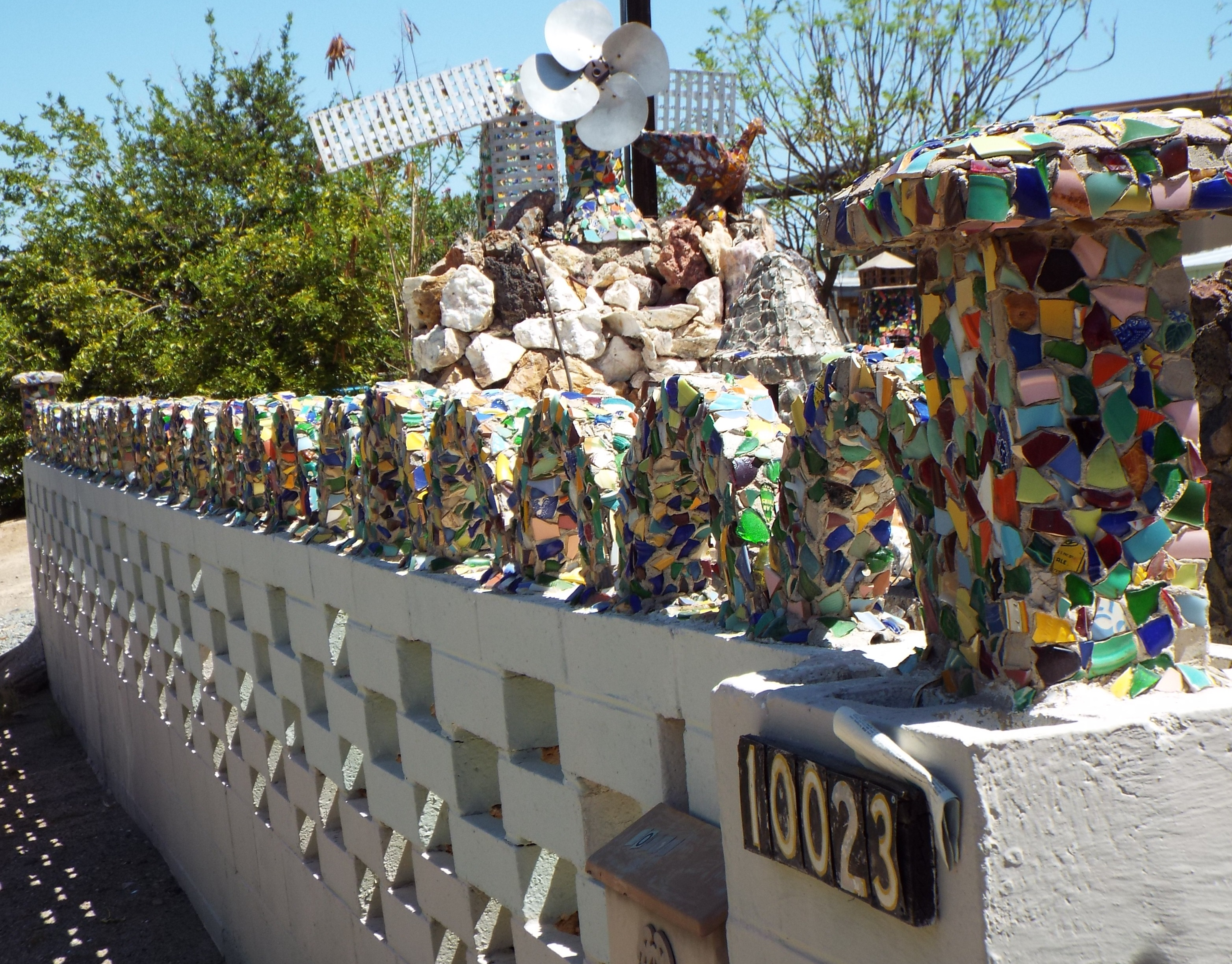
The Snake created by Grover Cleveland Thompson which adorned the entrance of his house.

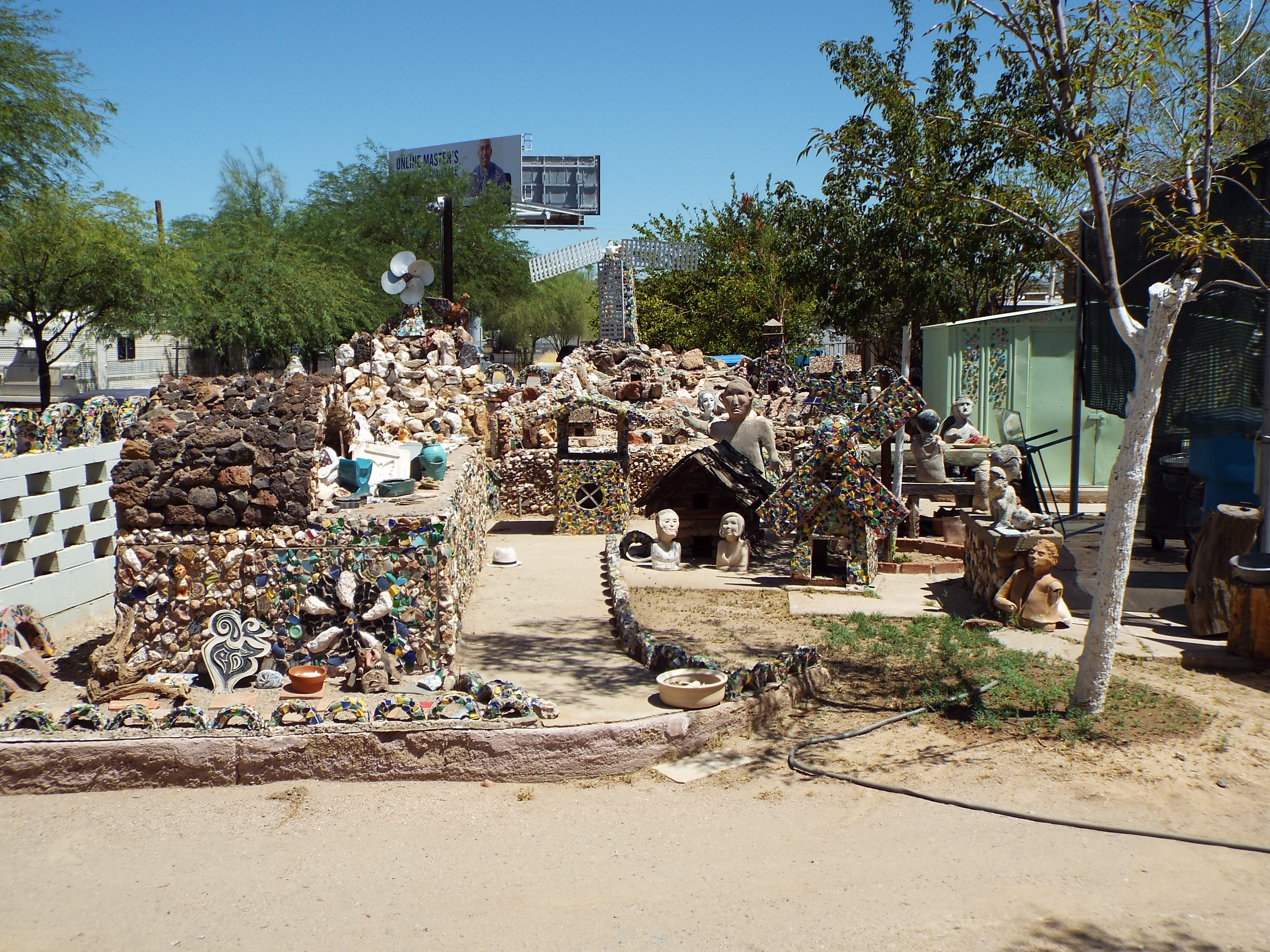
The Sunnyslope Rock Garden was created by Thompson between 1952 and 1972.

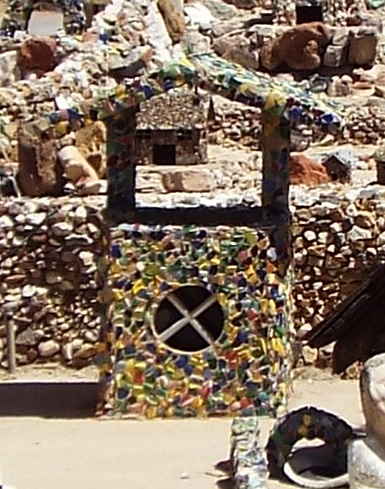
Thompson's art in the rock garden.

== See also ==
- List of historic properties in Casa Grande, Arizona
- List of historic properties in Chandler, Arizona
- List of historic properties in Florence, Arizona
- List of historic properties in Glendale, Arizona
- List of historic properties in Mesa, Arizona
- List of historic properties in Peoria, Arizona
- List of historic properties in Phoenix, Arizona
- List of historic properties in Tempe, Arizona
- El Cid Castle
