= RACV =

RACV can refer to:

- Royal Academy of Valencian Culture (RACV)
- Royal Automobile Club of Victoria
- RACV Royal Pines Resort
- RACV Credit Union
