= Australian Unity =

Mutual company in Australia

- Type: Mutual
- Industry: Health; Wealth; Care
- Predecessors: Manchester Unity Independent Order of Oddfellows (MUIOOF), Australian Natives' Association (ANA)
- Founded: 7 December 1840; 185 years ago in Melbourne, Victoria, Australia
- Founders: Thomas Strode; Augustus Greeves; John Marzagor; John Shepperd; William Johnson Sugden
- Headquarters: Melbourne, Australia
- Area served: Australia
- Products: Aged care; Banking; Financial services; Home care; Life insurance; NDIS provider; Private health insurance; Retirement communities
- Number of employees: 7,500 (2018)
- Website: www.australianunity.com.au

Australian Unity is an Australian mutual company having its origins in the friendly societies movement. In 2012, Big Sky was merged with Australian Unity to become the banking arm of the company.

== History ==
It was formed as the Manchester Unity Independent Order of Oddfellows (MUIOOF) in Melbourne, Victoria, on 7 December 1840 by eight men including Thomas Strode, publisher of the Port Phillip Gazette and Augustus Greeves, inspired by Independent Order of Oddfellows Manchester Unity.

In 1993, Manchester Unity merged with the Australian Natives' Association to form Australian Unity. Later mergers occurred with Grand United Friendly Society in 2005, Lifeplan Australia Friendly Society in 2009, and Big Sky Credit Union in 2012. Australian Unity has about 8,500 employees across healthcare, insurance and banking (in the guise of Big Sky Credit Union) divisions.

In 2012, Big Sky merged with Australian Unity to become the banking arm of Australian Unity. Ownership of Big Sky Credit Union Limited was transferred to Australian Unity Limited's subsidiary Lifeplan Australia Building Society Limited and renamed Big Sky Building Society Limited. Members of Big Sky Credit Union became members of Australian Unity.

== Manchester Unity Building ==
In 1931, the order commissioned the Manchester Unity Building, a neo-Gothic Art Deco skyscraper designed by Marcus Barlow,and construction was completed in 1932. It is one of the most well-known and recognisable buildings in Melbourne.

Another Melbourne building owned by Manchester Unity Oddfellows, at 335–347 Swanston Street, also designed by Marcus Barlow and constructed in 1940-41, was compulsorily acquired by the Commonwealth government in 1947. The building, constructed in 1940–41, sits opposite the State Library of Victoria, adjacent to the Melbourne Central shopping centre.

Australia Unity currently operates out of the Australia Unity building at 271 Spring Street in Melbourne, developed as the new headquarters for the organisation. The 16 level office tower overlooks Carlton Gardens, and combines heritage and modern elements in its design.

== Predecessors and previous incarnations ==
- Manchester Unity Independent Order of Oddfellows (MUIOOF)

- Australian Natives' Association

- Grand United Friendly Society

- Grand United Order of Oddfellows Friendly Society (GUOOFS)

- Lifeplan Australia Friendly Society

- Big Sky Credit Union
