= Manchester Unity Building =

Building in Melbourne, Australia

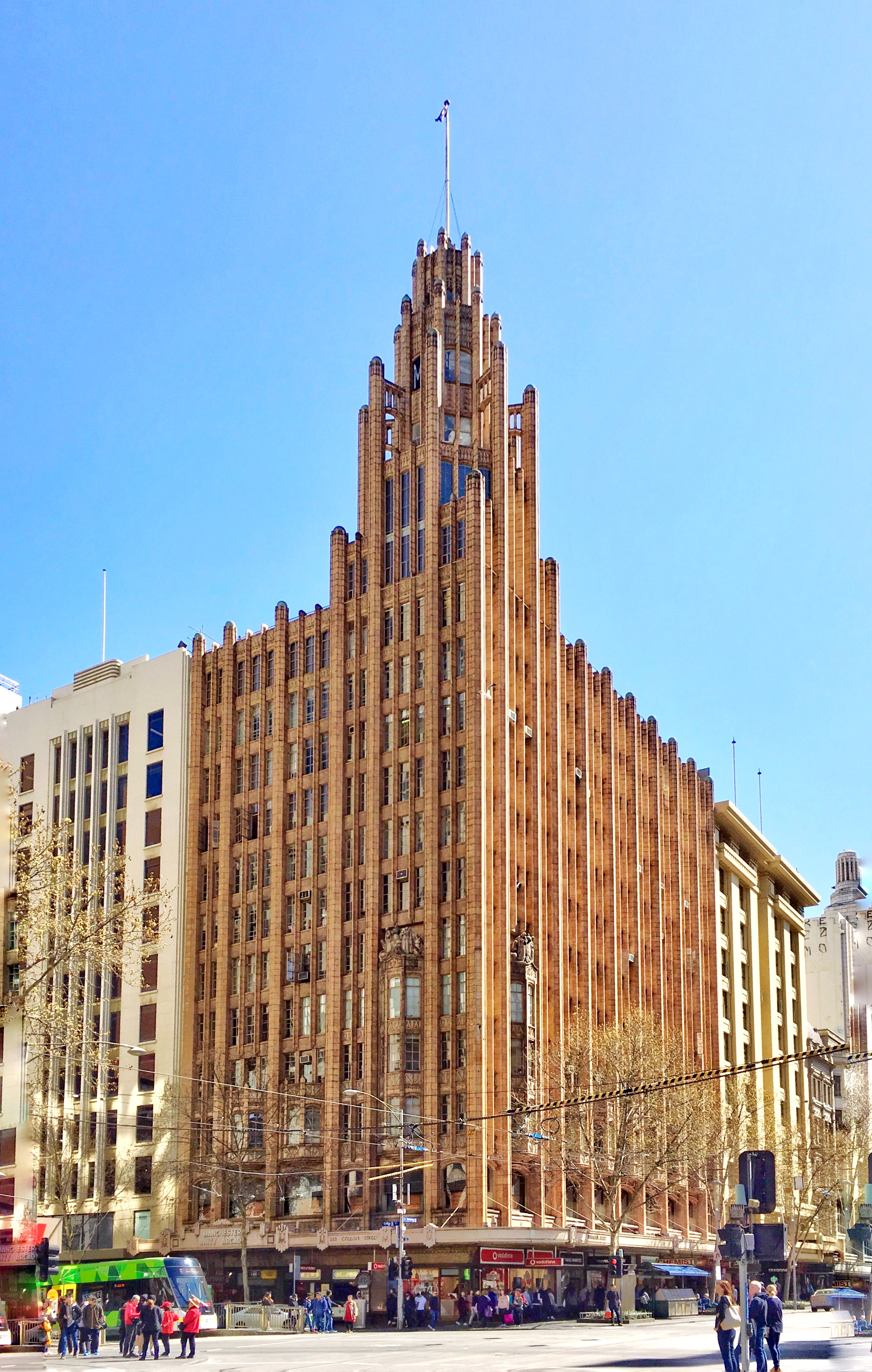
- The building viewed from Swanston Street in 2017
- Interactive map of the Manchester Unity Building area

General information
- Location: Melbourne, Victoria, Australia
- Coordinates: 37.8154°S 144.9664°E
- Completed: 1932
- Opening: 1932-12-13

Height
- Antenna spire: 64 metres (210 ft)
- Roof: 40.2 metres (132 ft)
- Top floor: 12

Technical details
- Floor count: 12
- Lifts/elevators: 3

Design and construction
- Architect: Marcus Barlow
- Main contractor: WE Cooper Pty Ltd

Website
- www.manchesterunitybuilding.com.au

The Manchester Unity Building is an Art Deco Gothic inspired office and retail building in Melbourne, Victoria, Australia, constructed in 1931–32 for the Manchester Unity Independent Order of Oddfellows. The soaring stepped corner tower on a prominent intersection opposite the Melbourne Town Hall makes it one of the most prominent and best known buildings in Melbourne.

== History ==
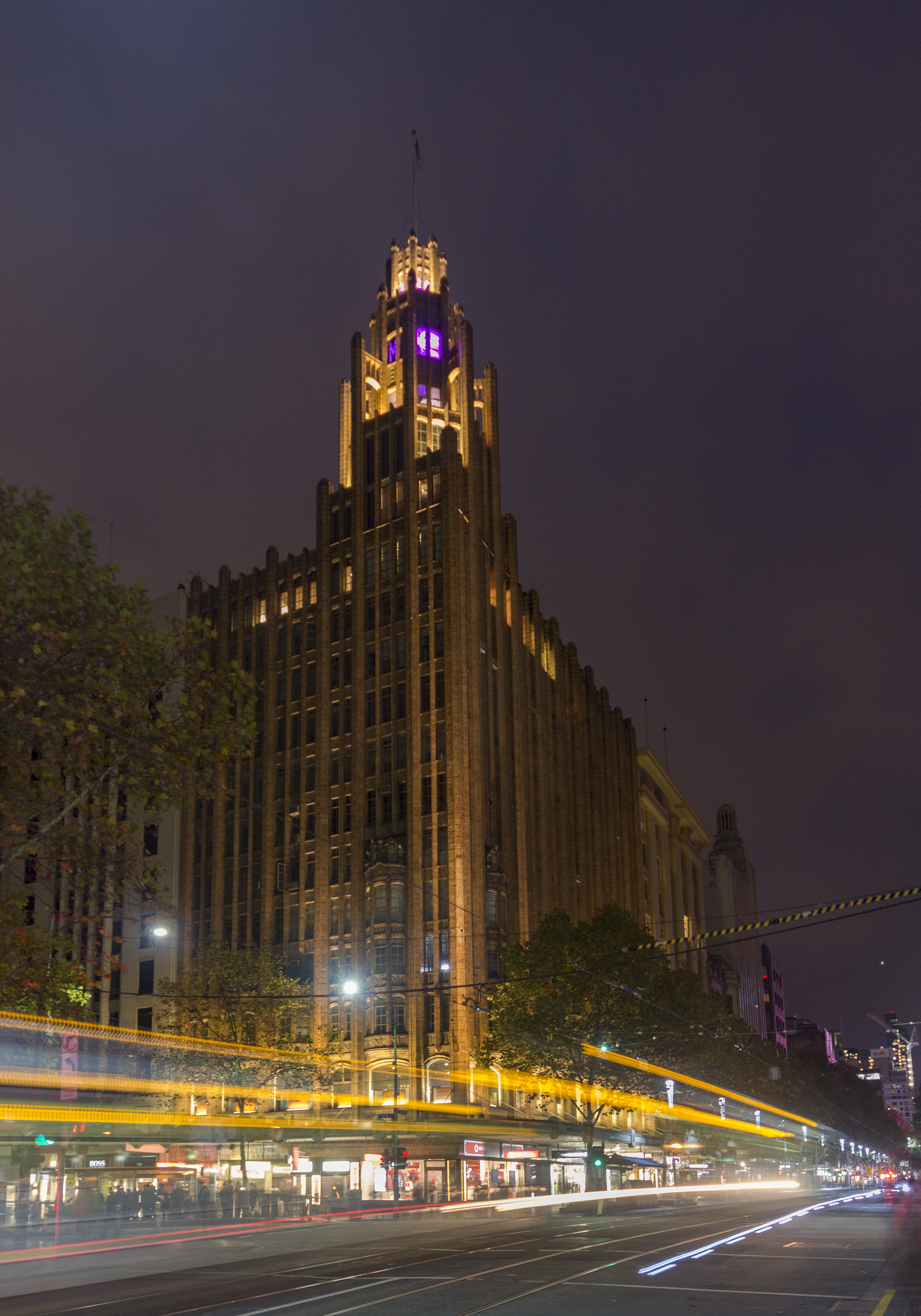
Manchester Unity Building at night

The site, on the north-west corner of the intersection of Collins and Swanston Streets, was purchased by the Manchester Unity Independent Order of Oddfellows (MUIOOF) in 1928, reportedly for the sum of £250,000. Construction could not commence immediately however since the lease of the business in the existing building did not expire until the end of 1931. By that time the full effects of the Great Depression were being felt, but the Directors decided to press ahead because all the preparations had been made, and, being a benevolent society, felt it was important to show confidence that the economy would improve, and also to provide a source of employment. Architect Marcus Barlow designed the building, which was built by W E Cooper Pty Ltd, contracted for the price of £215,000. Construction commenced at midnight on 1 January 1932 with the demolition of the prior buildings on the site, and proceeded around the clock in eight-hour shifts.

For the first time in Australia a construction progress schedule was used to track and manage the construction of the building:

Upon [the schedule graph] is shown the progress of every section of the building as it must go forward... the exact time in which the excavation must be completed, when the escalators will be completed, and when the external painting will be finished... Progress payments to the builders are made upon the architects' certificate that the work is going forward to schedule.

Such was the speed of construction that in May the basement and ground floor arcade were structurally complete and ready to be fitted out, and by the end of July the roof had been laid, floors having been added at the rate of one a week on average. The shopping areas in the ground floor arcade, the basement and on the first floor were opened on 1 September, with a full page spread in The Argus describing the building in glowing terms, and advertising various suppliers, contractors, the shops and the Society.

The design included figures depicting 'Faith. Hope and Charity' above the oriel windows on each facade at the fifth floor, sculpted by Orlando Dutton. The ground level included an L shaped arcade connecting Collins to Swanston Street, and into the rear lane, and opening out to form the lift lobby. The arcade is richly finished in coloured marble, with copper shopfronts, and a larger cornice with panels depicting the activities of the society, as well as view of 'old melbourne', and the building itself. The lifts have elaborate copper doors, and veneered timber interiors with a leadlight dome. The design included the first escalators in Melbourne, connecting the ground level arcade with further shopfronts at the first floor, and with the basement shop, the latter since removed.

A dinner for several hundred guests was held on 12 December 1932 in the building's basement to celebrate its opening, with Sir Stanley Argyle, the Premier of Victoria, giving a speech. On declaring the building open, Argyle pressed a button which turned on, for the first time, the lights illuminating the tower and spire.

As well as numerous shops in the basement, ground and first floor, there was a rooftop restaurant. This was not a successful venture and soon closed.

During World War II, it was used by the Australian Army, Victorian Lines of Communication, Southern Command HQ. Once the war was over, the government moved other departments into the building that had been distributed over Melbourne.

The building was compulsorily acquired by the Commonwealth in 1947. It became the headquarters for Trans Australia Airlines and centralised offices for the Department of Munitions and Department of Aircraft Production.

Alongside Manchester Unity staff, tenants of the building have ranged from Averillite's, a clothing manufacturer, to Rene Henri, a high-society hairstylist, as well as numerous jewellers. Perhaps the most notorious episode in the building's history was the unsolved 1978 murder of three jewellers on the eighth floor. In 1997 the top two floors of the building were bought by a developer and converted into apartments, and a new rooftop residence was constructed, incorporating the tower. These floors and others were purchased by Dentist Kia Pajouhesh starting in 2003, when he first fell in love with the building and installed his practice on the first floor; he has led the revival and restoration of the building since then, including restoring floodlighting to the tower in 2012, and restoring the boardroom, including its (heritage listed) furniture.

Formal one-hour guided tours including a meal are run five times a day. Tours of the tower are amongst the most highly sought after destinations in the annual Melbourne Open House.

== Design ==
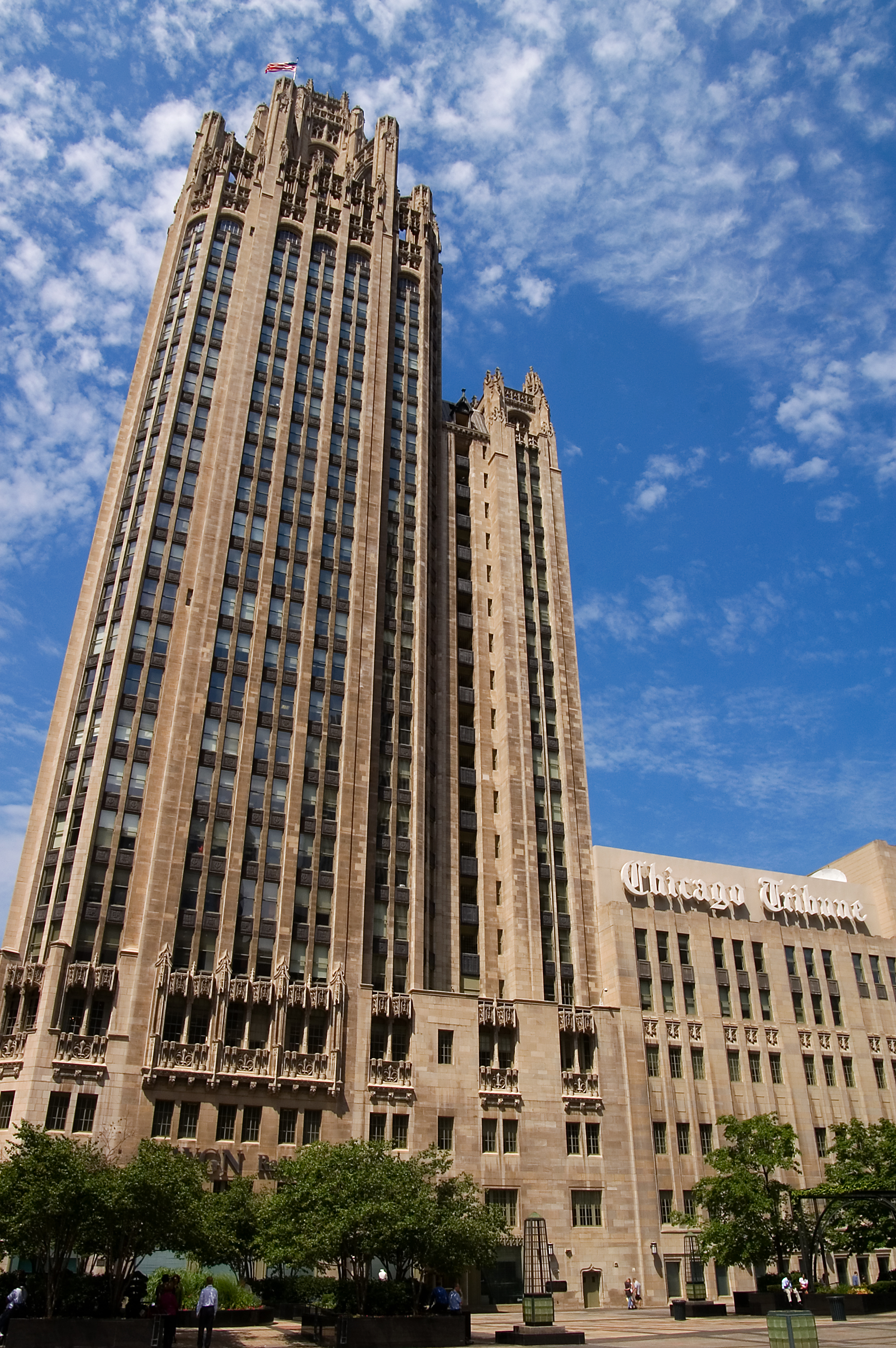
Chicago's Tribune Tower, an influence on the Manchester Unity Building

Barlow's design clearly draws heavily on the Tribune Tower in Chicago, Illinois. This design by Raymond Hood won an international competition in 1922, was completed in 1925, and has very similar vertical ribbing, buff coloured cladding, and a stepped Gothic crown complete with flying buttresses also seen on the Manchester Unity. Another more direct inspiration might have been the very similar but less ornate Grace Building in York Street, Sydney designed by Morrow and Gordon, which was under construction in 1929 when the Manchester Unity was designed, but both are said to have been inspired by the Tribune Tower.

The building is of concrete-encased steel construction, with the exterior cladding consisting of two hundred and fifty tons of terracotta faience tiles. Australian marbles are used extensively on interior walls throughout the building. Two escalators, the first in Melbourne, were installed by Austral Otis to provide access to the basement arcade and first floor from the ground floor arcade (though only one now survives). Three high-speed elevators were installed, capable of speeds of 600 feet per minute (3.0 m/s).

The building's roof reaches 132 feet (40 m), which was the height limit for buildings in Melbourne at the time of its construction, but the ornamental tower and spire extends a further 78 feet (24 m), as was permitted for non-habitable portions of buildings.

The floor size and shape have the ideal dimensions and flexibility for smaller scale businesses or for professional firms that require a smaller operation depth. The distance between façade and the edge of the building allows for smaller rooms along the windows with the regular and narrow mullions enabling flexibility of width.

== Current tenants ==
Smile Solutions dental specialists operate 40 surgical suites spanning across five floors and the multi-level tower of the building. Levels 1 and 10 cater for all general and cosmetic dentistry. Level 11 includes the restored Manchester Unity Building Boardroom, and the original Grand Secretary's office houses the executive offices of Smile Solutions management and patient co-ordinators. Level 12, originally a Wood Marsh Architecture residential penthouse development from the late 1990s has been converted to a dental specialist centre facility. The tower is utilised as the Smile Solutions orthodontic centre. Rob Mills Architects, Andronas Conservation Architects and Paul Bangay landscapers have supervised the restoration of these spaces. Dr Kia Pajouhesh, managing director and principal dentist of Smile Solutions, has been the Chairman of the MUB Owners Corporation since 2003.

The Manchester Unity Building is also home to a number of Melbourne's jewellery traders such as Simon West Fine Jewellery and Ellissi Jewellery Design.

== Gallery ==
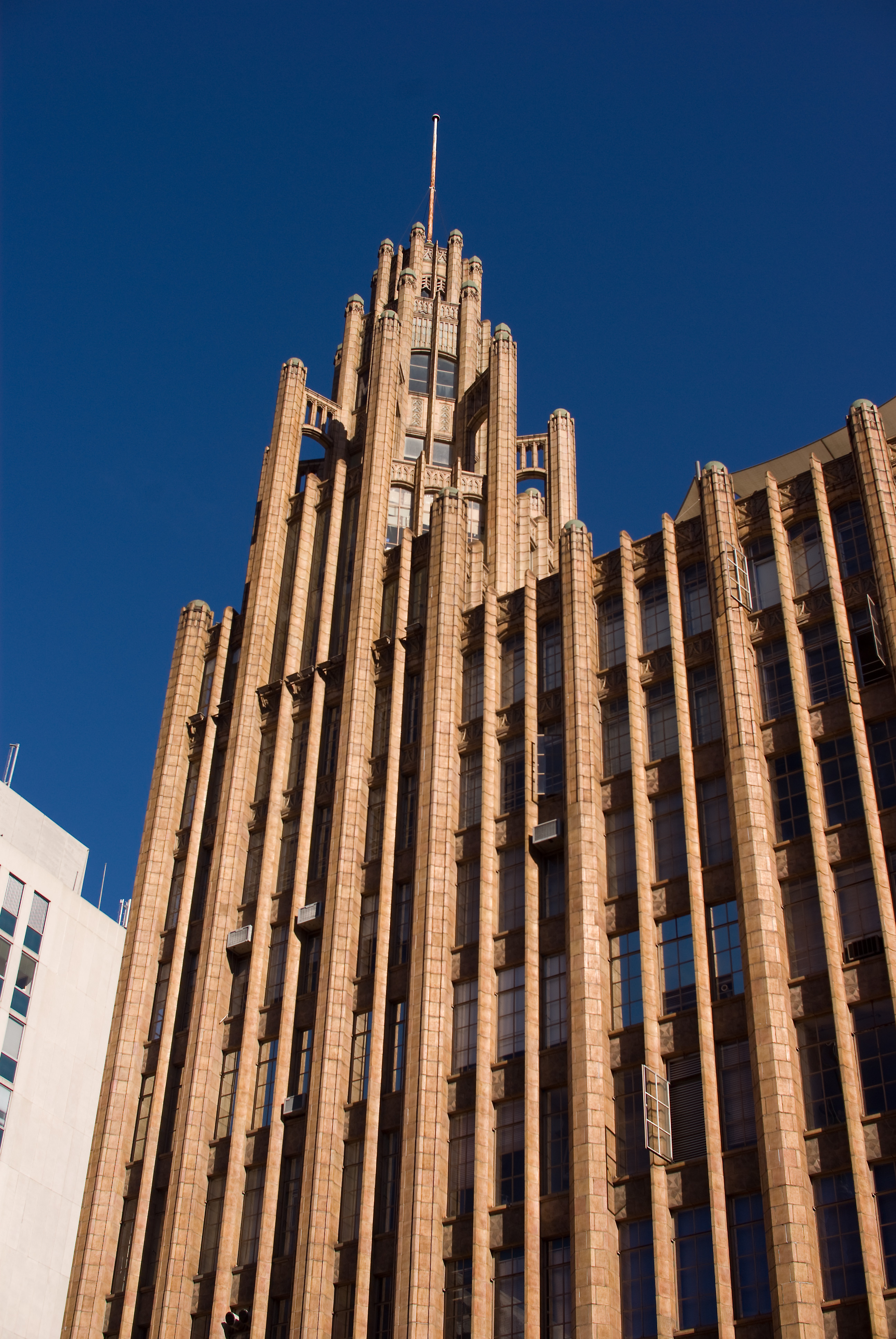
Upper portion of the eastern facade, including the tower and spire.

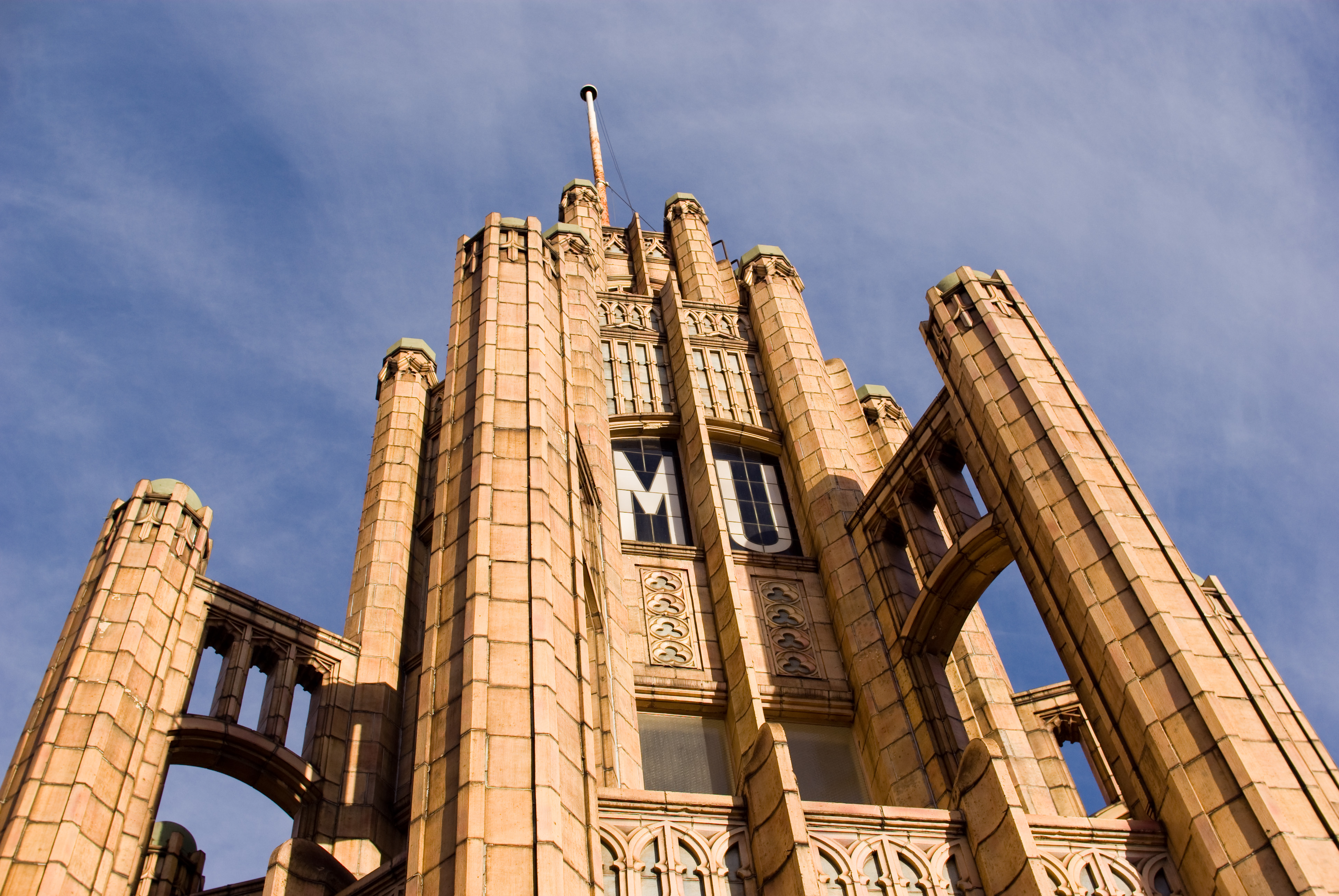
Detail of the tower and spire, as pictured from the roof terrace.

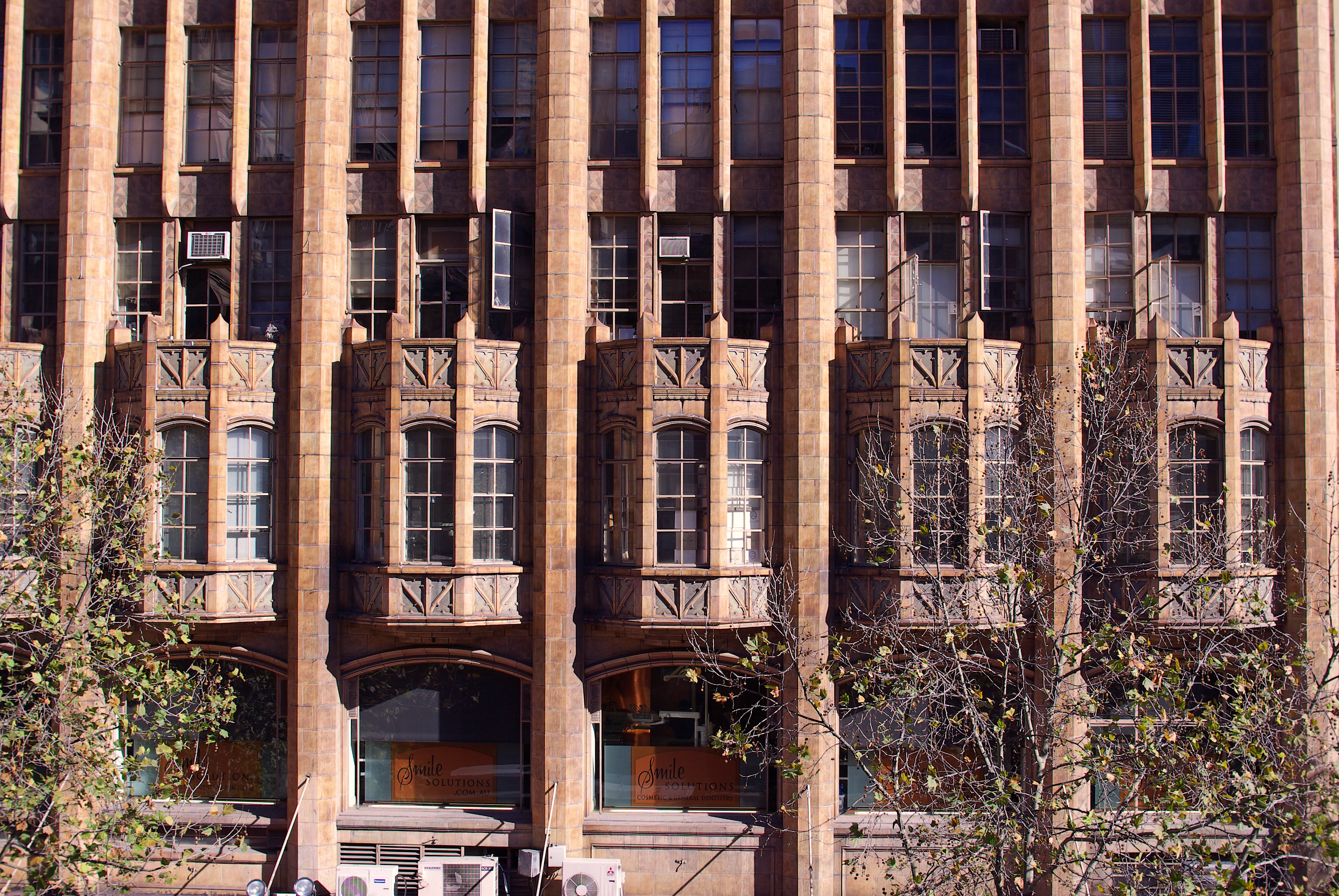
Detail of the eastern facade, showing second-floor bay windows and third-floor balconies.

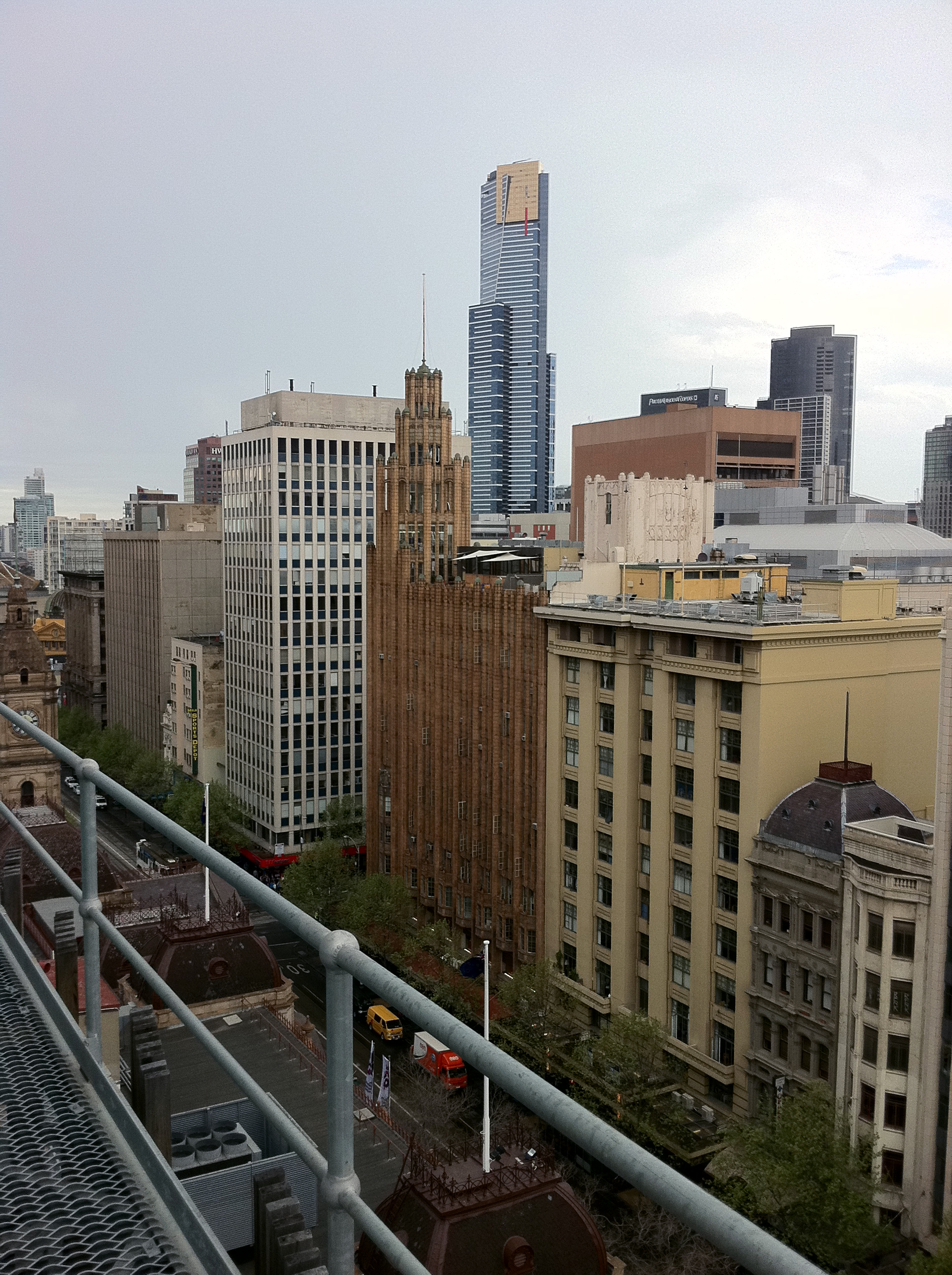
The building viewed towards the south west from the rooftop of Council House 2.

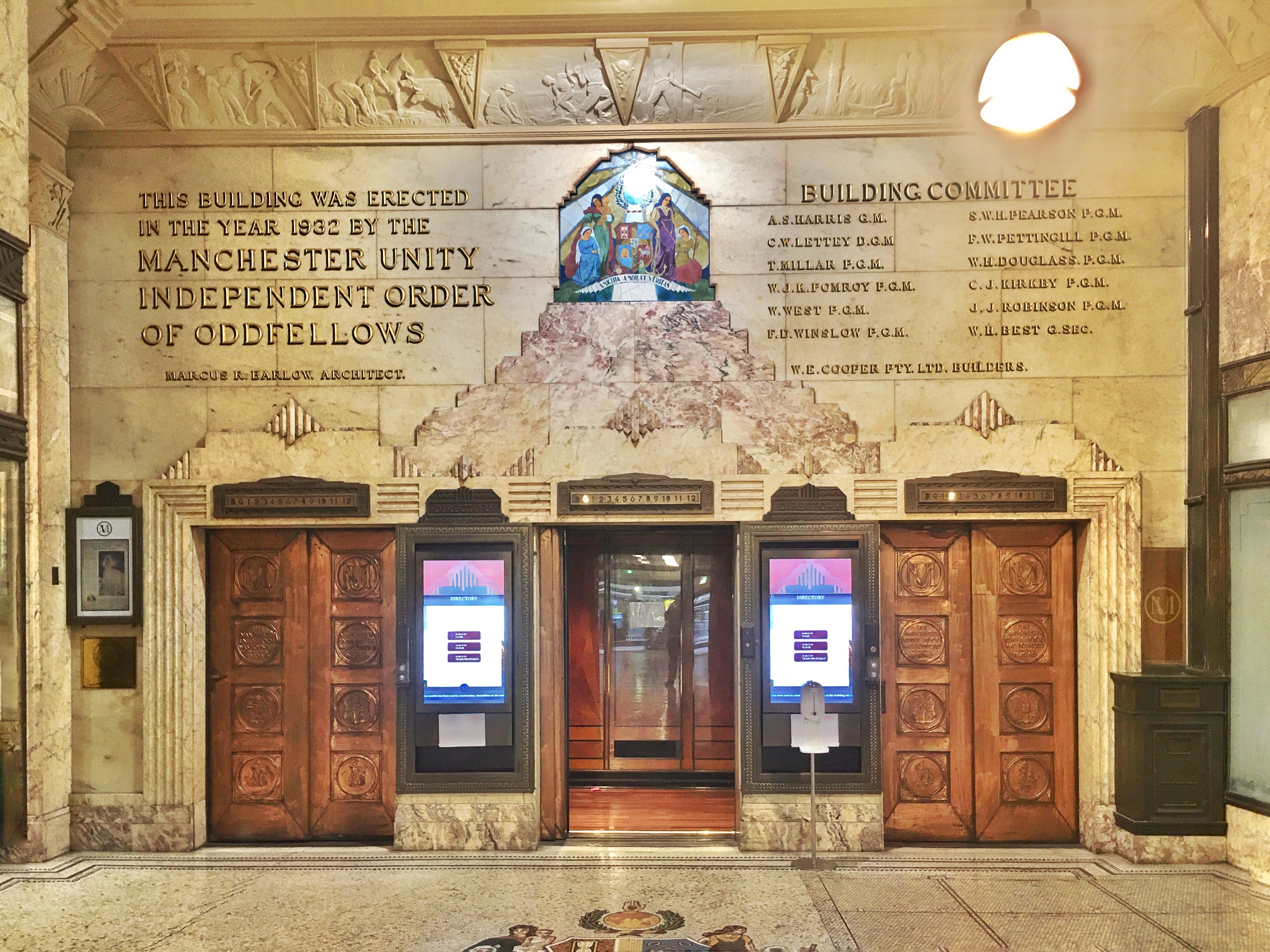
Lift lobby ground level

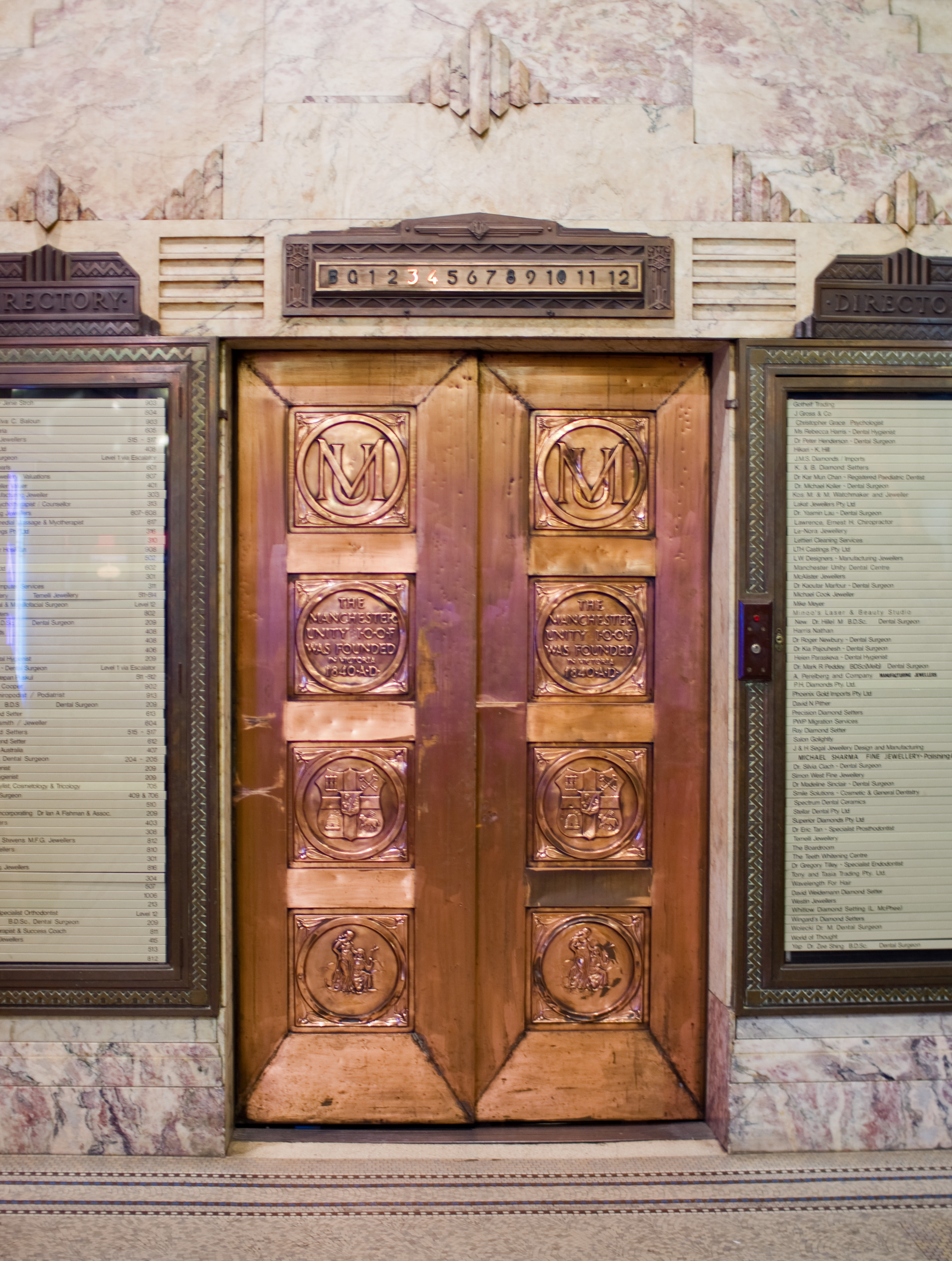
One of the ground floor lift doors.

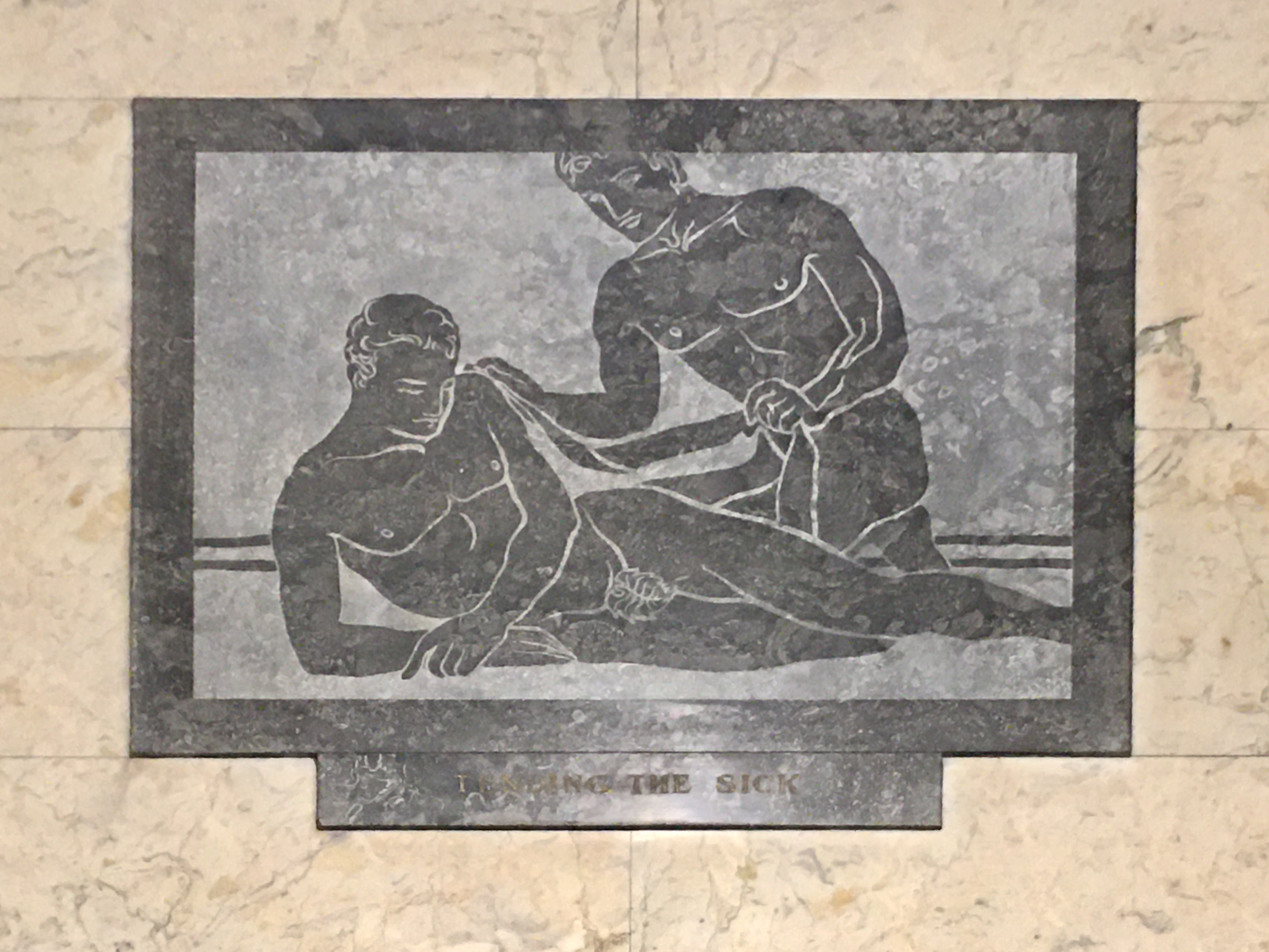
Ground floor arcade cornice panel depicting "healing the sick"

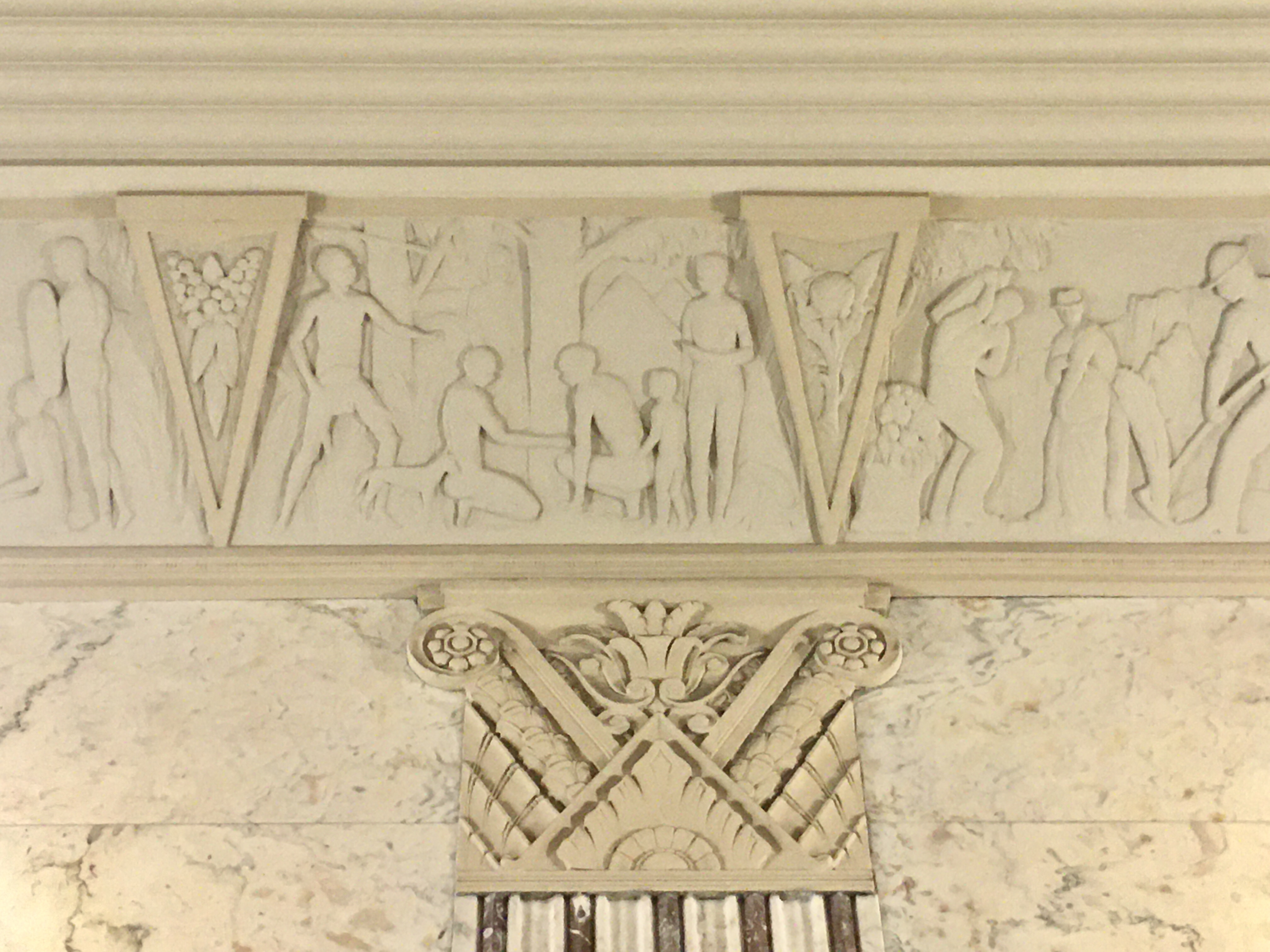
Ground level cornice panel depicting First Nations people

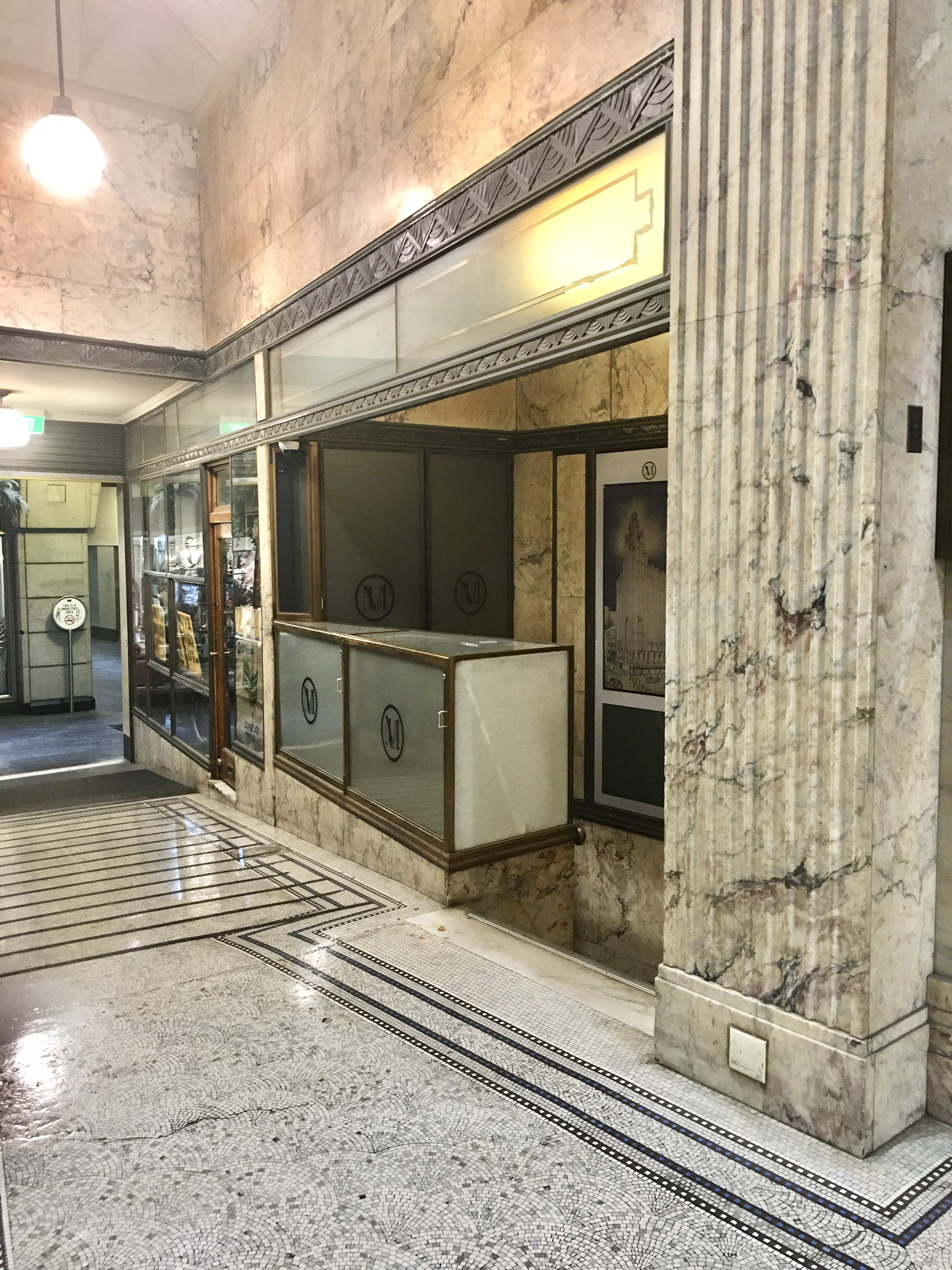
Arcade connection to rear laneway

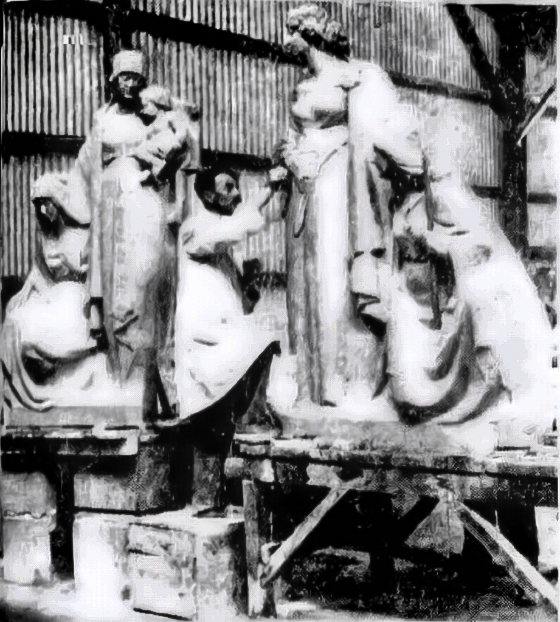
Orlando Dutton sculpting the figures for the 5th floor

== See also ==
- Architecture of Melbourne
