= Independent Order of Oddfellows Manchester Unity =

English fraternal order founded in 1810

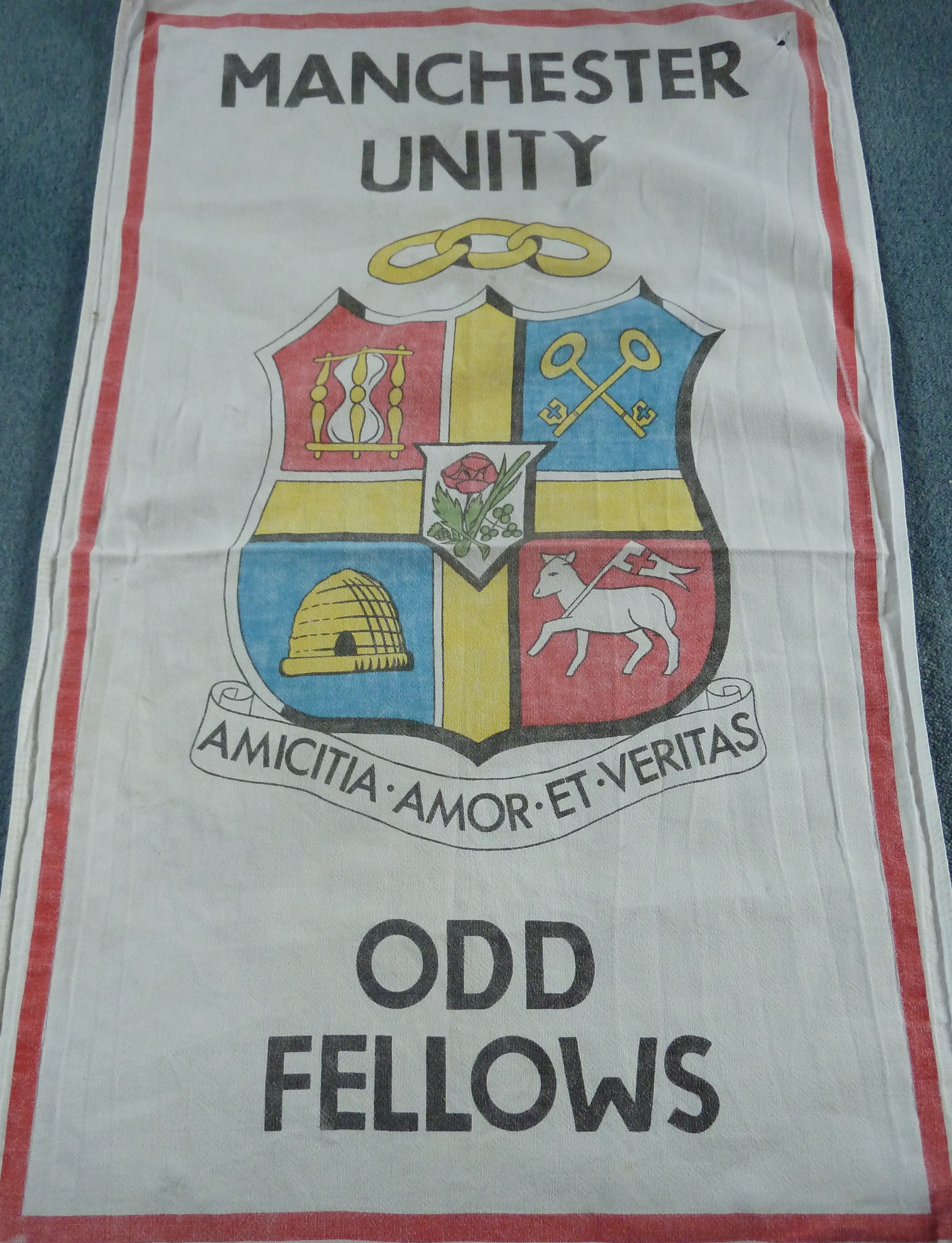
- Coat of arms along with the triple links symbol and the motto.
- Formation: 1810; 216 years ago
- Type: Fraternal order

The Independent Order of Oddfellows Manchester Unity Friendly Society Limited, also called the Manchester Unity of Oddfellows; trading as The Oddfellows, is a fraternal order founded in Manchester in 1810. (Note: There are, and have been, a number of different Orders of Oddfellows in the UK – refer to Societies using the name "Oddfellows" for a list. One of them, The Independent Order of Oddfellows Manchester Unity Friendly Society Limited, uses the trading name "The Oddfellows". Thus, there can be ambiguity when referring to "the Oddfellows".)

Some of its lodges claim histories dating back to the 18th century. (Note: Editors notes: The majority of the original content of this page was sourced from a document on the Manchester Unity website that does not quote its sources (Beresford 2006). That document's URL is no longer available although it can be accessed on the web via the Wayback Machine archive. Also most of its contents has now been distributed across a number of web pages, including: History of the Oddfellows 2012 and The Oddfellows Over the Years 2012. Other references tell a similar story, but they, too, rarely quote their sources.) These various organisations were set up to protect and care for their members and communities at a time when there was no welfare state or National Health Service. The aim was and still is to provide help to members and communities when they need it. The friendly societies are non-profit mutual organisations owned by their members. All income is passed back to the members in the form of services and benefits.

The Oddfellows had spread to America in the late 18th century, and several unofficial lodges existed in New York City; but American Odd Fellowship is regarded as being founded in Baltimore in 1819, by Thomas Wildey, and the following year affiliated with the Manchester Unity. In 1843, the Oddfellows in America declared their independence from the Manchester Unity of Oddfellows and became a self-governing Order – the Independent Order of Odd Fellows – which established lodges across the world (and continues to this day), although inter-fraternally recognised.

The Oddfellows are also fundraisers for local and national charities; lodges raise money for local causes, and the society as a whole raise significant amounts for charities.

== History ==
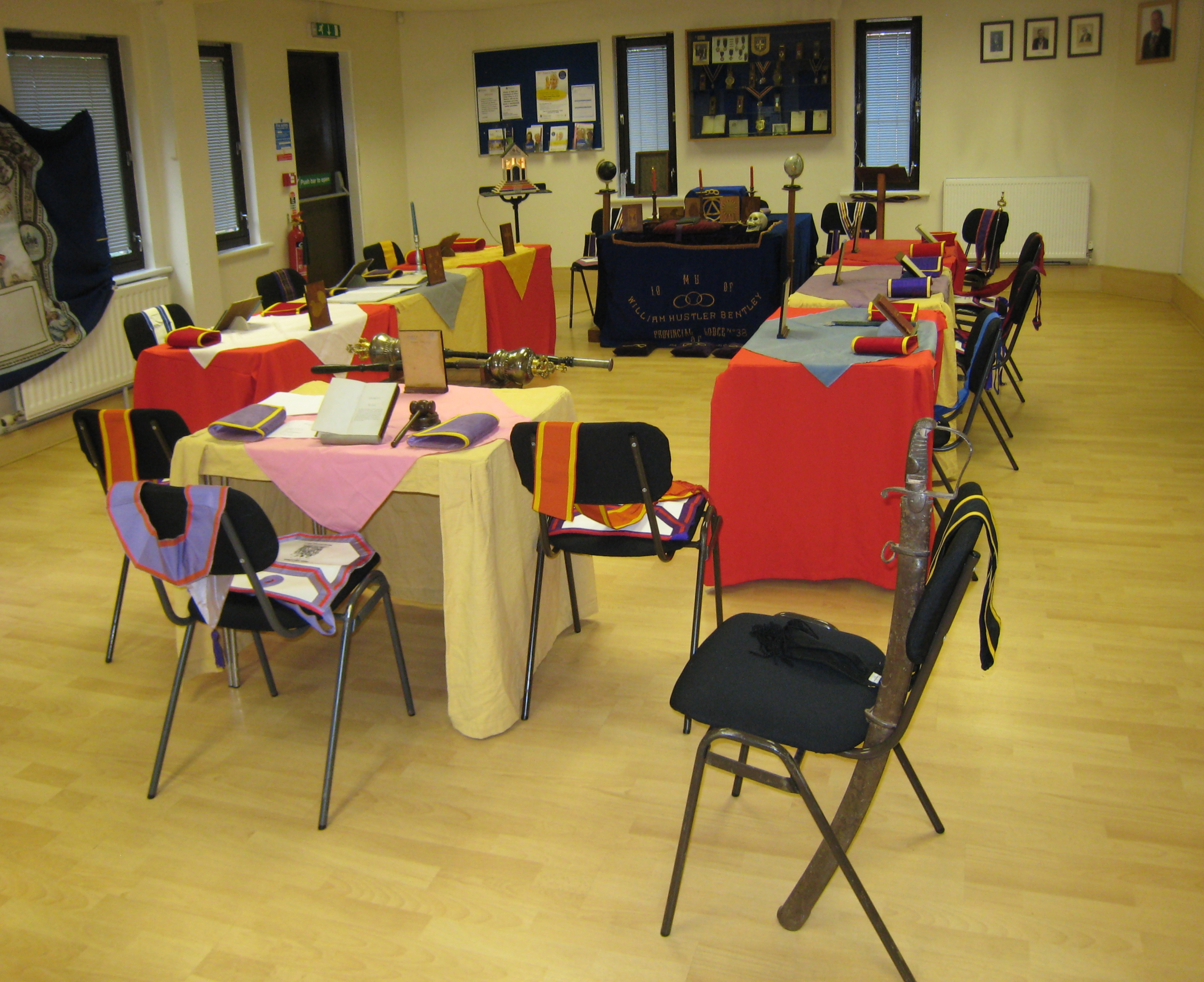
Odd Fellows meeting room set out for formal meeting. There is a sword and chair for the Guardian of the door.

=== Background ===
As a result of the Glorious Revolution of 1688, (when the Protestant William of Orange replaced the Catholic King James II), in the mid-18th century the Oddfellows split into The Order of Patriotic Oddfellows (based in the south of England and supporting William) (Note: The existence of the 'Patriotic' Order has been confirmed by the discovery of a copy of the rituals revised by a meeting of the Grand Lodge held in London in 1797.) and The Ancient Order of Oddfellows (based in the north and favouring the Stuarts).

Subsequent to the failure of Bonnie Prince Charlie's uprising, in 1798 the two Orders formed a partial amalgamation as the Grand United Order of Oddfellows. These days they are more commonly known as the Grand United Order of Oddfellows Friendly Society (GUOOFS). (Note: The Grand United Order of Oddfellows, established in England in 1798, should not be confused with the Grand United Order of Odd Fellows, established in the USA in 1843.)

=== Foundation ===
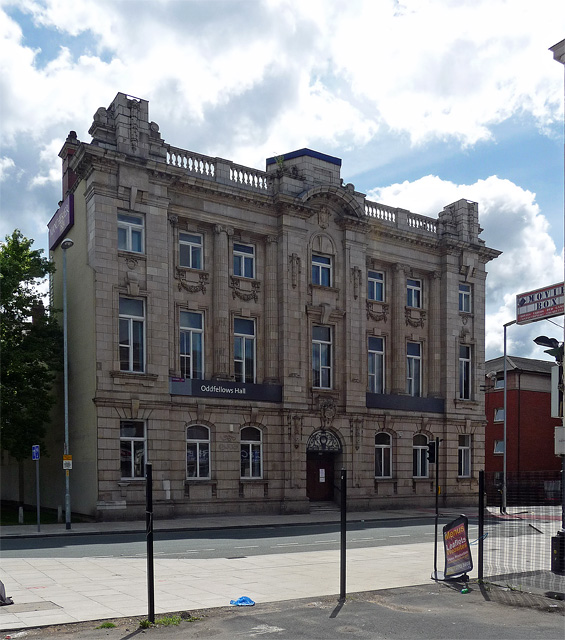
Oddfellows Hall; built in 1900-10

In 1810, members of the Oddfellows in Manchester area became dissatisfied with the way the Grand United Order was being run and formed the Independent Order of Oddfellows Manchester Unity. The order continues in operation using the trading name "The Oddfellows".

According to Manchester Unity literature, "With their improved organisation and rules, they encouraged many other lodges across the country to leave the old Grand United Order and join the Independent Order under the 'Manchester Compliance'.

=== Subsequent breakaways ===
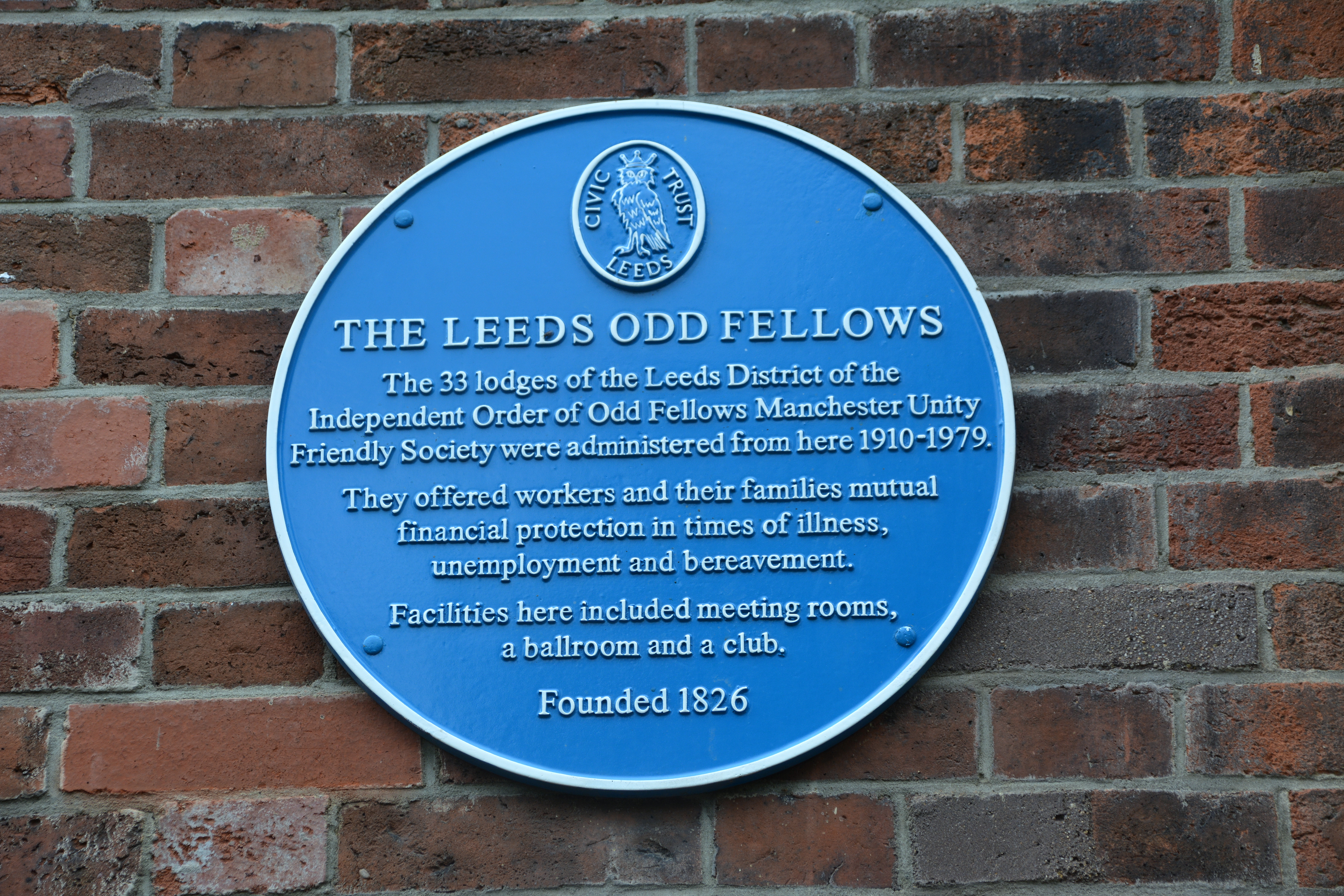
The Leeds Odd Fellows, Queen Square, Leeds

Subsequent breakaways from the parent Grand United Order and from the new Manchester Unity Order resulted in the formation of further Orders of Odd Fellows. In the case of the parent Order, various lodges seceded in 1832 to found the Ancient & Noble (Bolton Unity), which subsequently dissolved in 1962, and in the case of the new Order, the Nottingham Odd Fellows.

The Grand United Order of Oddfellows (Sheffield Unity) was formed in an early breakaway from the Manchester Unity. The Ancient Noble Order of Oddfellows (Bolton Unity) was formed from the Sheffield Unity in 1832. The Nottingham Ancient Imperial Order of Oddfellows was formed from the Sheffield Unity in 1812. The Improved Independent Order of Oddfellows (London Unity) was formed from the Manchester Unity around 1820. The British United Order of Oddfellows was formed from the Imperial Nottingham Order in 1867.

The Albion Order of Oddfellows was formed from the Manchester Unity in 1831. Several other secessions then occurred to form the Nottingham Independent Order, the Derby Midland Order, the Ilkison Unity and the Norfolk and Norwich Unity. The Kent Unity was formed in 1805; its first Lodge, however, was not formed until 1861.

The Kingston Unity of Oddfellows was formed from the Manchester Unity in 1840, and the National Independent Order was formed from the Manchester Unity in 1846. There was an East Anglia Unity; a few items of their regalia and jewels are in the museum at Freemasons' Hall in London.

The Wolverhampton Unity of Oddfellows ceased to exist in 1876 when it merged with the Ancient Order of Shepherds.

==== American separation ====
The Oddfellows had spread to America in the late 18th century, and several unofficial lodges existed in New York City; but American Odd Fellowship is regarded as being founded in Baltimore in 1819, by Thomas Wildey, and the following year affiliated with the Manchester Unity.

In Britain in 1834, the Tolpuddle Martyrs were unexpectedly convicted and transported for "membership of an illegal friendly society". The Oddfellows "board of directors" hastily modified the "constitution" to evade a similar fate. Members of the Oddfellows in the United States were not pleased to see the ancient rituals changed without their agreement, particularly to satisfy a British Government against which they had fought a war of independence. As a result, in 1834 the Oddfellows in America declared their independence from the Manchester Unity of Oddfellows and became a self-governing Order – the Independent Order of Odd Fellows – which established lodges across the world (and continues to this day). Lodges have been set up in Canada, Germany, Iceland, Denmark, Belgium, Finland, the Netherlands and many other European countries, and in Asia.

=== International spread of Oddfellowship ===
The concept of the Oddfellows was taken abroad as members emigrated to the far-flung corners of the Commonwealth and to the New World. Today, the Oddfellows can be found in many countries across the world, including Australia, New Zealand, South Africa and the West Indies.

A revival of the procedures followed by the oldest ascertained Oddfellows' unit, the "Loyal Aristarcus Lodge" in London (1730–40), was started in 2010 by a group of Italian Oddfellows, led by Masonic author Michele Moramarco.

==== Australian Lodge (1849–1993) ====
The first meeting of the Australia Felix Lodge of Manchester Unity Independent Order of Oddfellows (MUIOOF) was held on 7 December 1840 in Melbourne. Its founder, Thomas Strode, printer and proprietor of Melbourne's first legally recognised newspaper the Port Phillip Gazette, advertised in his paper for past members of the Oddfellows Society of Manchester to meet with him to discuss forming a Melbourne lodge. Along with Strode, Manchester Unity's founders in Australia included Dr Augustus Greeves, a surgeon who later became the Mayor of Melbourne; John Marzagor, a carpenter; John Shepperd, a painter and glazier; and William Johnson Sugden, a sheriff's bailiff who four years later became the colony's chief constable.

On 1 January 1932, work began on the Manchester Unity Building in Melbourne. By that time the full effects of the Great Depression were being felt, but the Directors decided to press ahead because, being a benevolent society, they felt it was important to show confidence that the economy would improve, and also to provide a source of employment.

In 1993, Manchester Unity (Victoria) merged with the Australian Natives' Association to form Australian Unity Friendly Society Limited, now known as Australian Unity Limited.

== Organisation ==
=== Oddfellows lodge ===
The elimination of the Trade Guilds removed an important form of social and financial support from ordinary working people. In major cities like London, some Guilds (e.g. the "Free Masons" and the "Odd Fellows") survived by adapting their roles to a social support function. Both of these had their base in London, but had established branches (called 'Lodges') across the country.

The earliest surviving record of an Oddfellows Lodge is the manuscript of the rules, dated 1748, of the "Loyal Aristarcus Lodge No. 9" which met in inns in the Southwark, Hatton Garden and Smithfield areas of London. Many pubs in Britain are named 'The Oddfellows' or 'Oddfellows Arms', probably because they were once meeting places of Lodges.

In the French Revolution, the radicals who seized control were afraid of the Oddfellows, Freemasons and the like. Membership became a criminal offence in France, and such organisations were driven underground and forced to use codes, passwords, special handshakes and similar mechanisms. Fear of revolution was not the sole reason for persecution; Friendly Societies like the Oddfellows were the predecessors of modern-day trade unions and could facilitate effective local strike action by levying all of their members for additional contributions for their benevolent funds, out of which payments could be made to the families of members who were on strike.

The Oddfellows subsequently introduced a number of novel benefits for members. These included the Travel Warrant, which allowed members seeking work to stay overnight in an Oddfellows Hall, anywhere in the country, free of charge. The Oddfellows also introduced standard protection policies, sometimes called "tables" because each type of policy had its own numbered table of premium rates. People could subscribe to protect themselves financially. In the United Kingdom, until 1948, payment was required to see a doctor or to go into hospital. Many people therefore joined friendly societies like the Oddfellows to obtain financial protection to meet these costs.

== Activities ==
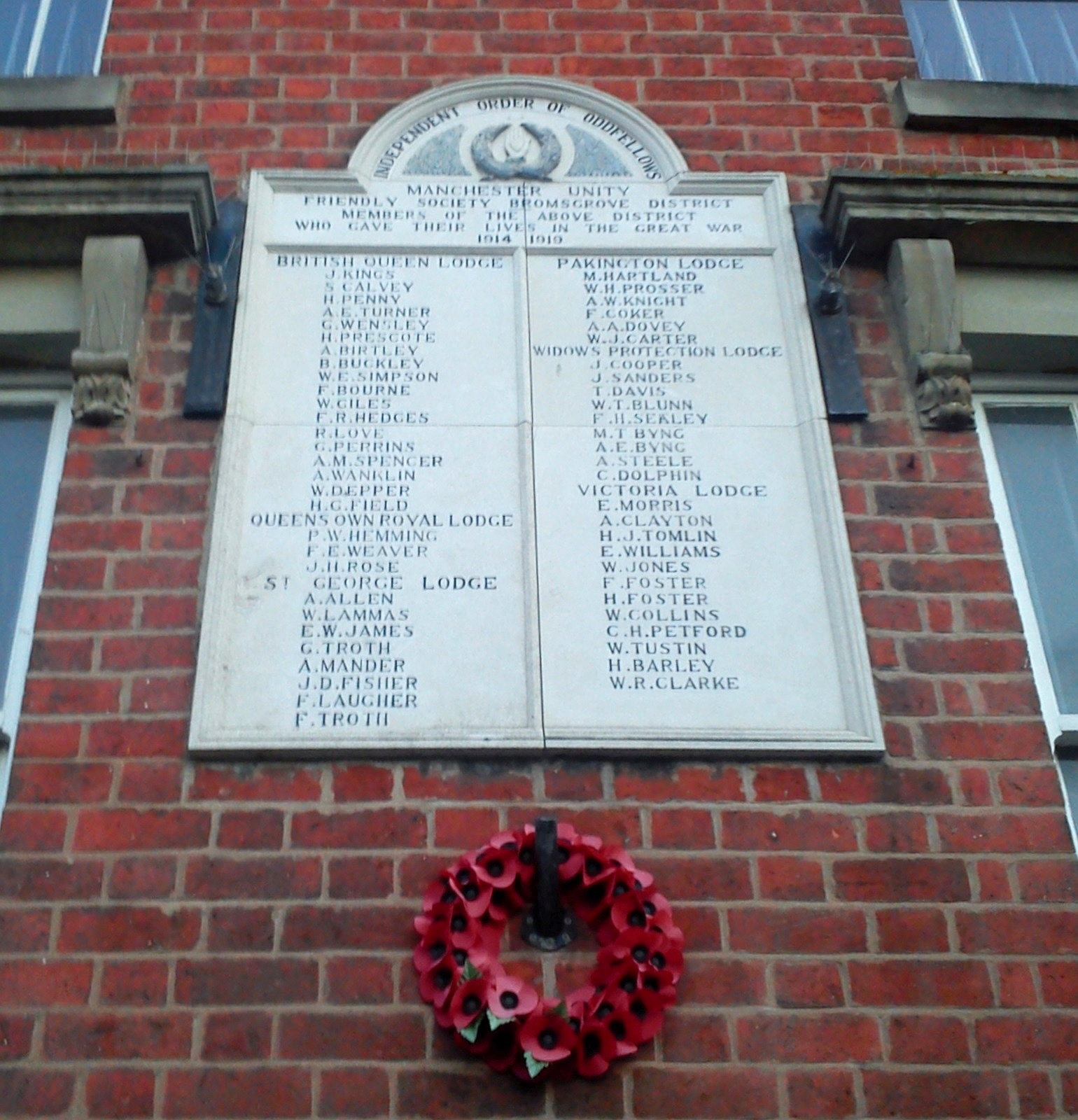
Odd Fellows (Manchester Unity) war memorial on a house in Bromsgrove, Worcestershire.

=== Financial services ===
During the 20th century, the welfare state and the National Health Service took over the significant part of the role of friendly societies, and since 1948 the role of the Oddfellows has evolved in other directions, with a continuing focus on social involvement, care and support, as well as financial benefits. In the second half of the 20th century, the Oddfellows moved into financial products. Thus, in 1991, Independent Order of Oddfellows Manchester Unity founded the Manchester Unity Credit Union Limited, a savings and loans co-operative established for members of the order.

== Legitimacy and controversy ==
=== State authorities ===
The Oddfellows continued to be viewed with suspicion by "the establishment". At various times, right up to 1850, some aspects of the Orders' practices were declared illegal. However, by 1850, the Independent Order of Oddfellows Manchester Unity Friendly Society had become the largest and richest friendly society in Britain. This growth was spurred by the growth caused by the Industrial Revolution, the lack of Trade Unions, and the lack of personal or public insurance; only by joining mutual friendly societies like the Oddfellows could ordinary people protect themselves and their families against illness, injury or death.

In 1911, when Asquith's Liberal government was setting up the National Insurance Act in Britain, the Oddfellows protected so many people that the government used the Oddfellows' actuarial tables to work out the level of contribution and payment required. At that time the Oddfellows was the largest friendly society in the world.

== Notable members ==
Throughout history some members of the fraternities have made no secret of their involvement, while others have not made their membership public. In some cases, membership can only be proven by searching through a fraternity's records. Such records are most often kept at the individual lodge level, and may be lost due to fire, flood, deterioration, or simple carelessness. Grand lodge governance may have shifted or reorganised, resulting in further loss of records on the member or the name, number, location or even existence of the lodge in question. In areas of the world where Odd Fellows have been suppressed by governments, records of entire grand lodges have been destroyed. Because of this, membership can sometimes be difficult to verify.

- King George IV of the United Kingdom
- Stanley Baldwin, Prime Minister of United Kingdom
- Winston Churchill, Prime Minister of United Kingdom
- William Massey, Prime Minister of New Zealand
- Sir George Savile, 8th Baronet, English politician
- John Wilkes, English radical, journalist and politician

== See also ==
- Grand United Order of Oddfellows
- Odd Fellows
- Odd Fellows (disambiguation)
