= Big Sky Credit Union =

Big Sky Credit Union (BSCU) was an Australian based credit union formed by the current or ex-employees, contractors or service providers of BHP, BP and the Royal Automobile Club of Victoria and their subsidiaries, affiliated or divested companies. Big Sky became part of Australian Unity in 2012 and was merged with Australian Unity's subsidiary Lifeplan Australia Building Society which was subsequently renamed Big Sky Building Society. From 2016, Big Sky's operations, services and website were integrated into Australian Unity. In 2018, Big Sky Building Society became Australian Unity Bank.

== History ==
The organisation started at the BHP Employee's Credit Co-operative in the 1970s. As part of a round of consolidation in the Australian Credit Union industry the Big Sky and BP Credit Unions merged on 1 September 2003. The operations of the BP Credit Union were effectively taken over by the management of Big Sky.

In the 2006 financial year, the RACV Credit Union transferred its business to Big Sky, including all 2,364 members, and was wound up. The transfer of engagements contributed $12.1 million to Big Sky's assets and $1.6 million to member equity.

In April 2011 Co-operatives Australia listed Big Sky Credit Union as 69 on the list of Australia's 100 largest cooperatives with revenue of $17.2 million.

In 2012 Big Sky was merged with Australian Unity to become the banking arm of Australian Unity. Ownership of Big Sky Credit Union Limited was transferred to Australian Unity Limited's subsidiary Lifeplan Australia Building Society Limited and renamed Big Sky Building Society Limited. Members of Big Sky Credit Union became members of Australian Unity.

== Services ==
Big Sky were members of the rediATM to provide access to a network ATM machines that do not incur the direct charges introduced by the Reserve Bank of Australia in March 2019.
