= The Money Co-op =

British financial co-operative

- Founded: 1998
- Type: Industrial and provident society
- Headquarters: Manchester, England
- Website: https://www.themoney.coop

The Money Co-op (previously known at The Co-op Credit Union) is a not-for-profit member-owned financial co-operative, based in Manchester and operating throughout the United Kingdom.

Thousands of its members all over the UK have access to affordable loans and savings products as well as member offers and financial wellbeing support. Membership is free. Members must save a minimum of £10/month with the credit union.

Members can participate in the running of the credit union. Members elect the directors, vote on share dividend and can become actively involved as volunteers.

Established in 1998, the credit union is a member of the Association of British Credit Unions. In 2012, it adopted the national co-operative brand and in 2025, it rebranded and changed its name from The Co-op Credit Union to The Money Co-op.

== History ==
In 1997, the Head of Strategy at The Co-operative Group, approached the Manchester Headquarters Staff Council with a proposal that it act as a steering group to oversee the creation of a credit union for employees of the various members of "the co-operative family" in Greater Manchester.

The Co-op Group provided premises at the Old Bank Building (the former office of the bank's chief executive) in Hanover Street, Manchester, and, by 2004, the credit union had lent over £3,500,000 with almost 2,000 members, making it one of the fastest growing credit unions in the UK.

In 2014, the credit union was awarded a grant of £100,000 by the Lloyds Banking Group Credit Union Development Fund to support its reserves and allow it to bring forward plans for growth.

In 2025, The Co-op Credit Union rebranded as The Money Co-op. In June of the same year it announced a proposal to merge with the smaller Manchester-based Unity Credit Union

== Activities ==
Members of the credit union save regularly every month, forming a pool of money which is lent by way of loans at reasonable rates of interest.

Membership of The Money Co-op is restricted by common bond to employees, pensioners and members of a range of organisations promoting and offering credit union membership as a benefit. Family members are also eligible to join provided they are living at the same address.

=== Products ===
The Money Co-op runs a payroll deduction savings and loans scheme in conjunction with The Co-op Group and participating regional societies. The credit union is responsible for the operation of the scheme, with the employer facilitating monthly deductions from salary. Members who are not paid through a co-operative society can make contributions by standing order.

Instead of paying a fixed rate of interest on savings balances, credit unions return any surplus profit to members. Depending on reserves, shares are eligible for an annual dividend. Life savings and loan protection insurance is also offered at no cost to members.

The Money Co-op is registered under the Industrial and Provident Societies Acts as The Co-operative Family Credit Union and is authorised by the Prudential Regulation Authority and regulated by the Financial Conduct Authority and PRA. Ultimately, like the banks and building societies, members' savings are protected against business failure by the Financial Services Compensation Scheme.

The Friends of The Co-operative Credit Union Lottery is a private lottery for members, drawn on the first Tuesday of each month.

== See also ==
- Credit unions in the United Kingdom
- The Co-operative Group
- List of European cooperative banks
