= Unity Credit Union =

Non-profit co-operative organization

- Founded: 2001 (1991)
- Type: Industrial and Provident Society
- Location: Oddfellows House, 184–186 Deansgate, Manchester M3 3WB
- Website: unitycreditunion.co.uk

Unity Credit Union Limited, formerly Manchester Unity Credit Union, is a not-for-profit member-owned financial co-operative, based in Manchester and operating throughout the United Kingdom. The credit union was first established for members of the Independent Order of Oddfellows by Manchester Unity Friendly Society in 1991.

== History ==
The credit union traces its roots to Manchester Unity (No 1) Credit Union, which was founded in the English Midlands in 1991, followed by Manchester Unity (No 2) Credit Union in North London in 1994 and Manchester Unity (No 3) Credit Union in Yorkshire in 1997. In 1999, the Treasury announced that credit unions would be brought within the mainstream regulatory scheme administered by the Financial Services Authority. With little growth and increasing legislation, talks took place between the credit unions and the Board of the Oddfellows bringing all three together in 2001.

In 2022, the common bond was expanded to include members of the Ancient Order of Foresters Friendly Society and Manchester Unity Credit Union became Unity Credit Union.

In June 2025, Manchester-based The Money Co-op announced plans to merge with Unity Credit Union.

== Activities ==
Membership of Unity Credit Union is restricted by a common bond to members of the Oddfellows or the Foresters or a member of the same household who is a relative. New members can join both the Oddfellows and the credit union at the same time, which entitles them to the benefits of both organisations for a single monthly contribution.

A member of the Association of British Credit Unions Limited, Unity Credit Union is authorised by the Prudential Regulation Authority and regulated by the Financial Conduct Authority and the PRA. Ultimately, like the banks and building societies, members' savings are protected against business failure by the Financial Services Compensation Scheme.

== See also ==
- Credit unions in the United Kingdom
- British co-operative movement
- Oddfellows
