= RACV Credit Union =

Union

- Company type: Credit union
- Industry: Financial services
- Founded: 1972
- Defunct: 2005
- Fate: Merged with Big Sky Credit Union
- Successor: Big Sky Credit Union
- Headquarters: Noble Park, Victoria, Australia
- Area served: Victoria
- Services: Credit union services
- Members: 2,364 (2005)

The RACV Credit Union was a credit union based in suburban Victoria, Australia that merged with Big Sky Credit Union in 2005. Membership of the credit union was open to staff and families of current and former employees of the Royal Automobile Club of Victoria and to Club Members of the organisation.

The credit union was formed in 1972 The credit union had cash handling facilities at its head office within the RACV service Headquarters in Noble Park. In 1978, the credit union was part of a training program for Swinburne College. "Under college supervision, students worked as a team to produce a useful programme for the RACV Credit Union."

In 2005 the RACV Credit Union's members voted to transfer their business to the Big Sky Credit Union. At the time it had 2,364 members. The transfer of engagements contributed $12.1 million to Big Sky's assets and $1.6 million to member equity.
