= Marcus Barlow =

Australian architect (1890–1954)

- Born: 1890
- Died: 1954 (aged 63–64)
- Occupation: Architect

Marcus Barlow (1890 – 1954) was an Australian architect in the interwar period, who designed a number of notable central city buildings in his home-town of Melbourne. He is best known for the 1932 Manchester Unity Building, whose neo-Gothic corner spire dominates the major intersection of the city.

== Biography ==
Barlow was born in Melbourne in 1890. It is not known where he trained, and he first appears as a partner in the firm of Grainger Barlow & Little in 1917. Grainger and Little were late-career architects and had a number of substantial designs to their names. They also had wide professional networks, which no doubt helped Barlow in his later career. In 1922, F. G .B. Hawkins became a partner and, in 1924, he and Barlow left to form Barlow & Hawkins. Barlow left in 1927 to head his own firm.

A vital moment of his career was being appointed by the trustees of the Howey Estate, owners of about a quarter of a city block since the first land sales in 1837, to design the 12-storey Howey Court (demolished in about 1989). Barlow went on to design three other buildings in the estate over the next decade: the Manchester Unity, the Presgrave Building and the Century Building. Barlow managed to maintain a thirty-strong team during the economic turmoil of the Great Depression, no doubt largely due to the construction on the estate.

Barlow was an enthusiastic adopter of the latest overseas styles and trends, advocating for instance for car-parking structures in the 1920s, the scrapping of the 132-foot (40 m) height limit to allow for skyscrapers, and the installation of air-conditioning. He was innovative on a domestic level as well, as seen in his Strawbale Home Building, in which straw bales were used as a more economical alternative to brick construction.

He also had a strong social consciousness and public interest, and was part of Oswald Barnett's Slum Study Group (1934), Housing Investigation and Slum Abolition Board (1936). Those endeavours led to him becoming the first consulting architect appointed by the Housing Commission of Victoria, in 1937. He continued to practice after World War II, but "his best days were behind him", and he died in 1954.

== Notable projects ==
The following of his projects are all on the State Government's Victorian Heritage Register.

=== Manchester Unity Building ===
One of the best known and loved buildings in Melbourne, Manchester Unity Building dominates a main intersection in Melbourne, the corner of Swanston and Collins Streets. Barlow's proposal on behalf of the Manchester Unity Independent Order of Oddfellows took full advantage of the allowance for uninhabited elements to be built above the 132 ft height limit, by including a stepped 78 ft corner tower, the topmost point being one of the highest in Melbourne. The Melbourne City Council had only just modified the rules to require a vote on any such structure, this was the first one to come before Council in September 1930, and it was passed unanimously "as an asset to the architecture of the city". It is in a style known locally as 'Commercial Gothic', and drew strongly from the design of the Chicago Tribune Tower (1922) by Raymond Hood. It was also the first building in Melbourne to be constructed with an escalator. Barlow prepared immense amounts of preliminary work to ensure the construction time of his works was kept to a minimum. Believing that speed is beneficial to up to a point where it increases capital cost and stating that "this point must be accurately determined by the architect before the tenders are called for the erection of the building", the Manchester Unity Building was erected in record time with works progressing exactly to the detailed schedule that Barlow had prepared.

=== Century Building ===
Barlow's 1939 design for the Century Building, at the other end of the same block as the Manchester Unity Building, is a vertical Moderne interpretation of his earlier design. The vertical piers and small round tower are clad in off-white glazed faience tiles; Wunderlich Limited, manufacturers of faience, often used the Century Building in their advertisements, claiming that the cladding 'gives a permanent freshness and sparkle to this fine building. Window spandrels are in hand moulded terracotta glazed neutral grey to achieve an arresting architectural contrast'. The Century Building was not only fresh and modern looking, it was also the first building in Melbourne to be air conditioned. The Century Building's most prominent feature is the tower which is positioned at the corner of Swanston and Little Collins streets.

=== Colinton ===
A Tudor Revival style house, Colinton is considered representative of the range of houses in a variety of styles produced by Barlow and Hawkins. Marcus Barlow was a skilled publicist and Colinton was featured in an extensive article in the leading magazine "Australian Home Beautiful" in May 1927 as well as in Barlow and Hawkins's showcase publication "Australian Homes" also published in 1927; the prominence given to the design of Colinton is said to have contributed to the adoption of Tudor style for residential and commercial developments into the 1930s. The house was state heritage listed in 1997.

=== Croydon Baby Health Centre ===
The Croydon Baby Health Centre was built along with many other such centres in response to the changing social attitudes towards maternal and child health during the early twentieth century. Barlow himself held a deep interest in issues surrounding community health and it is thought that he completed the project with no commission. Built in 1930, it was designed, like Colinton, in a particularly delightful version of the Tudor or 'Old English' style. Features include picturesque massing, half timbering, diamond pane windows, a lych gate, and a wrought iron sign. Today the building continues to be used as a children's health centre under the title Croydon Maternal and Child Health Centre.

== List of works ==
- 1923–24 Temple Court 422–428 Collins St (Grainger Little Barlow & Hawkins)
- 1925 Collins Gate 373 Little Collins St (Barlow & Hawkins)
- 1925 Public Benefit Bootery 323–325 Bourke St (Barlow & Hawkins)
- 1926 Colinton 92 Mont Albert Road Canterbury (Barlow & Hawkins)
- 1930 Croydon Baby Health Centre 12 Civic Square Croydon
- 1931 Howey Court 234 Collins St (demolished)
- 1932 Midway Court 256 Collins St
- 1931-32 Manchester Unity Building 91 Swanston St
- 1933 Hardy Brothers two storey shop 338 Collins St
- 1933 Miller House 357–359 Collins St
- 1936 Albany Court 230 Collins St
- 1938 Presgrave Building 273–279 Little Collins St
- 1939 Strawbale Home Building Maidstone St Altona
- 1938–1940 Century Building 125–133 Swanston St
- 1940-41 IOOF Building (later Jensen House) 335-347 Swanston St
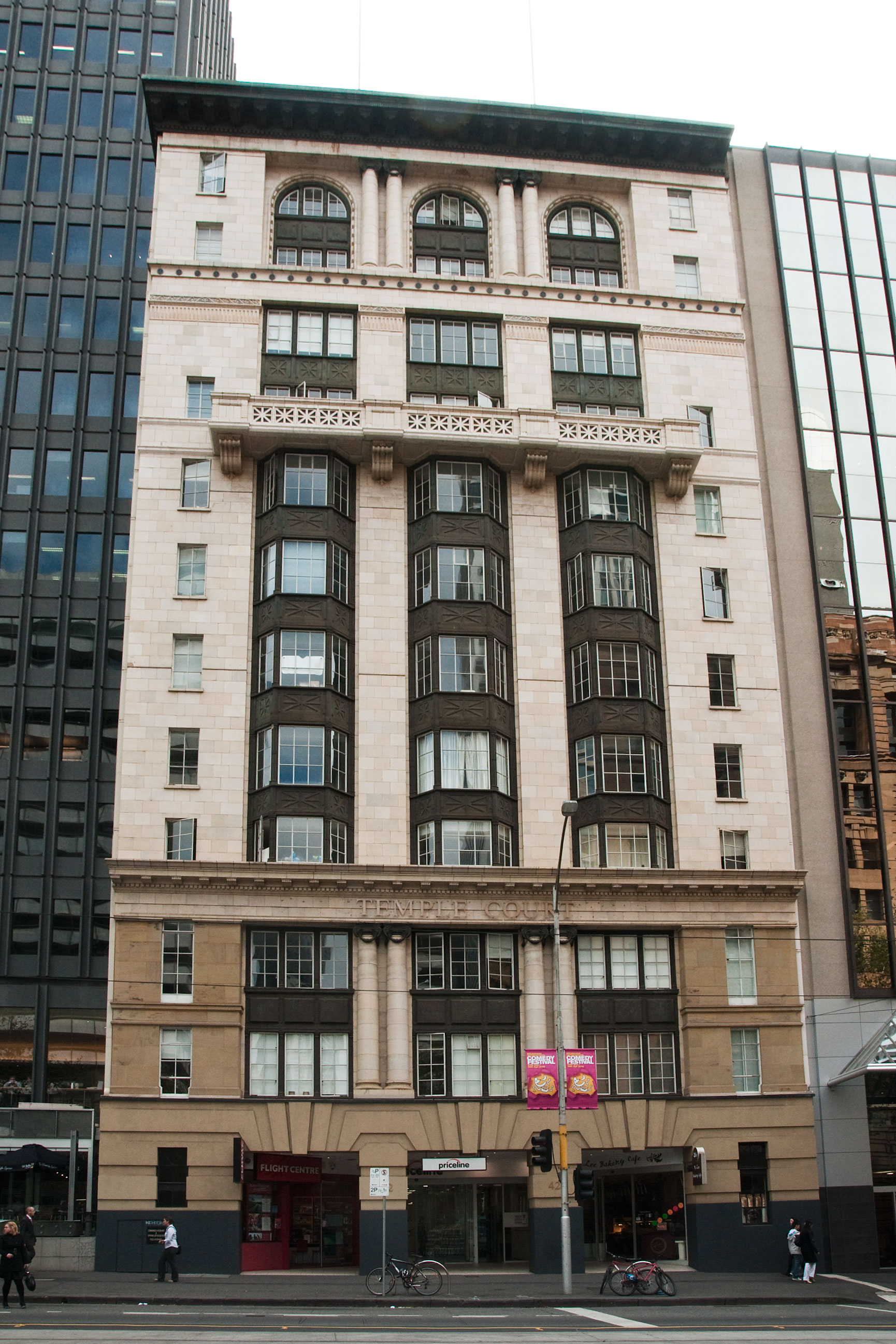
1923–24 Temple Court

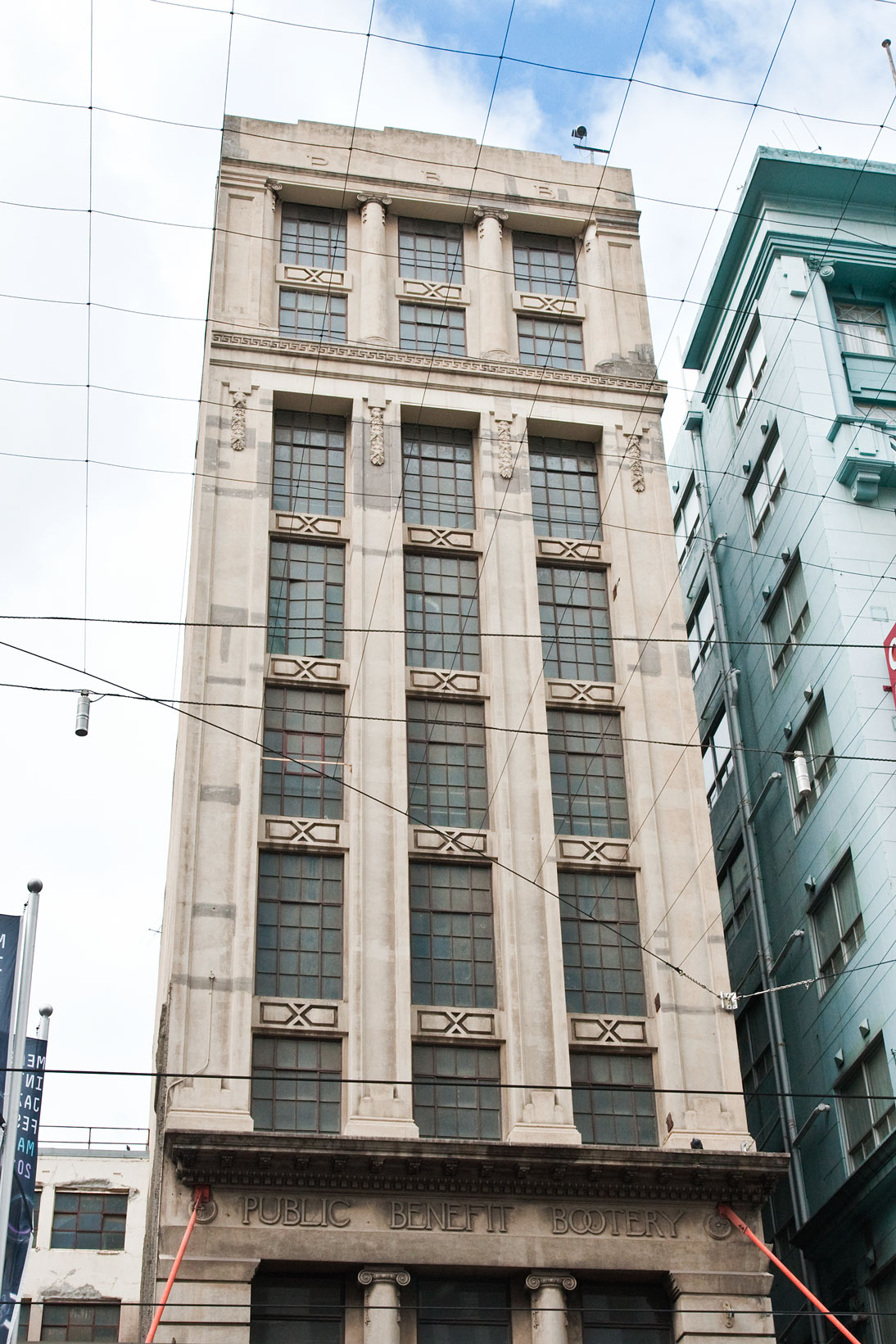
1925 Public Benefit Bootery

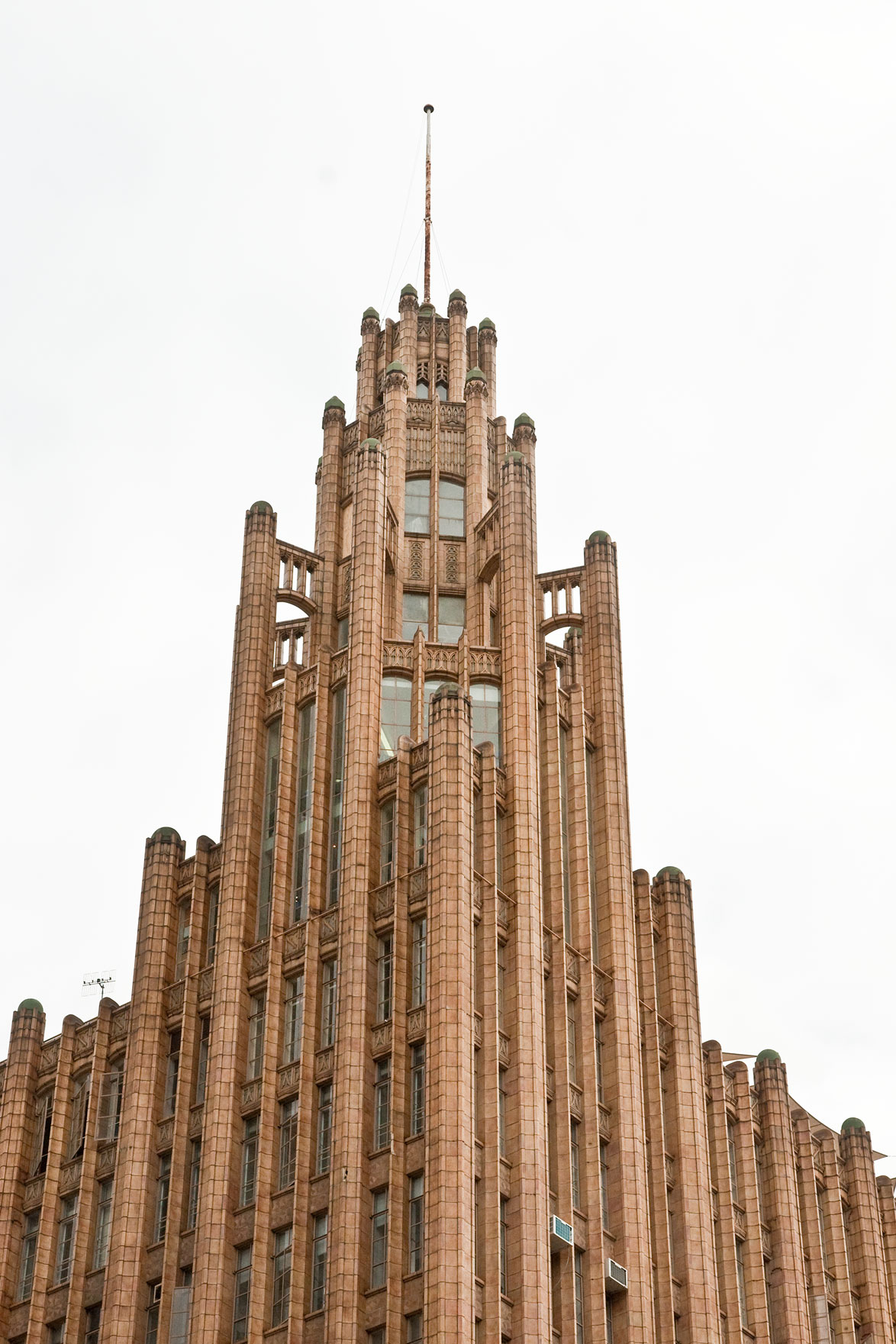
1929–32 Manchester Unity Building, Tower

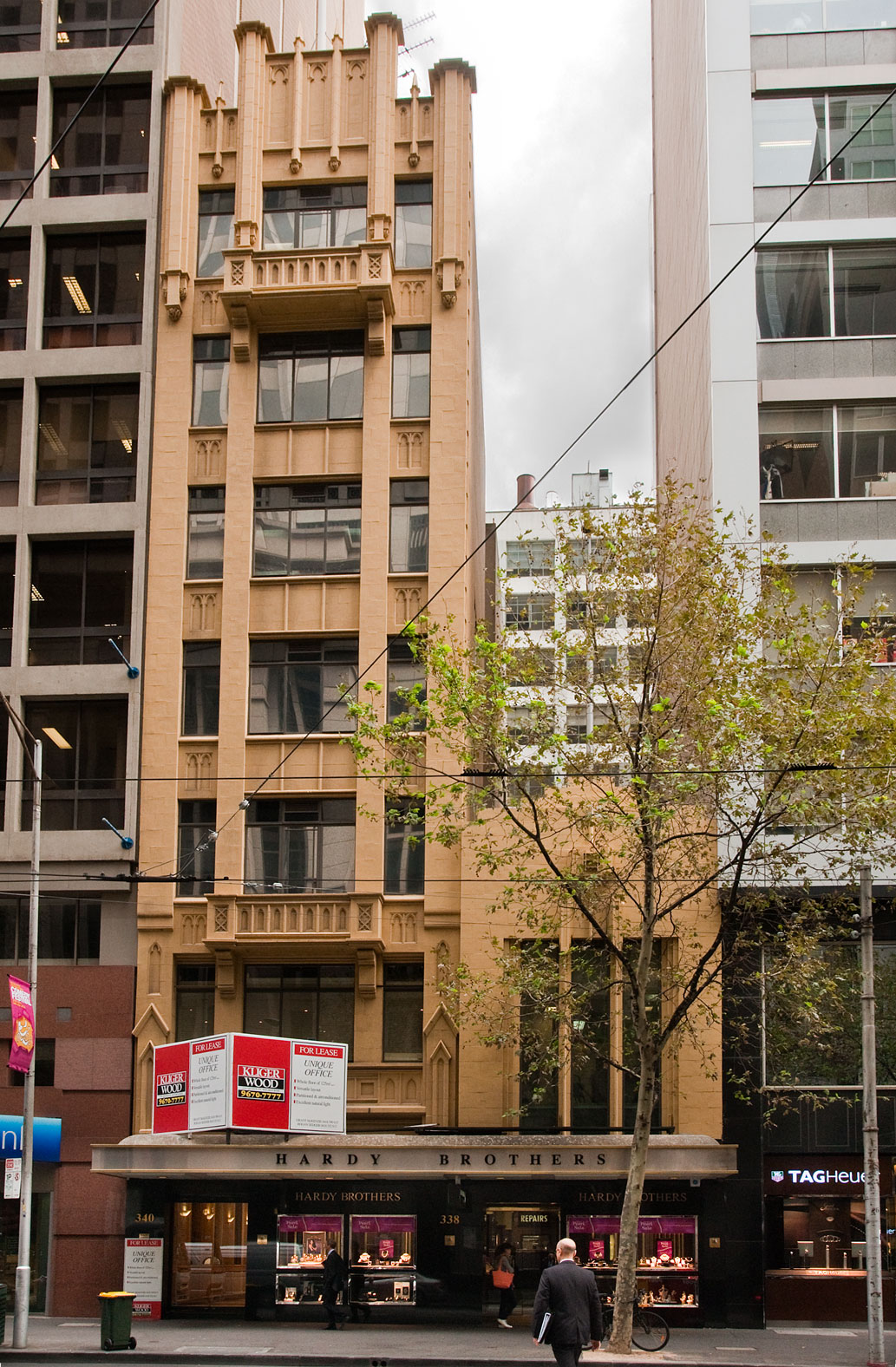
1933 Hardy Brothers

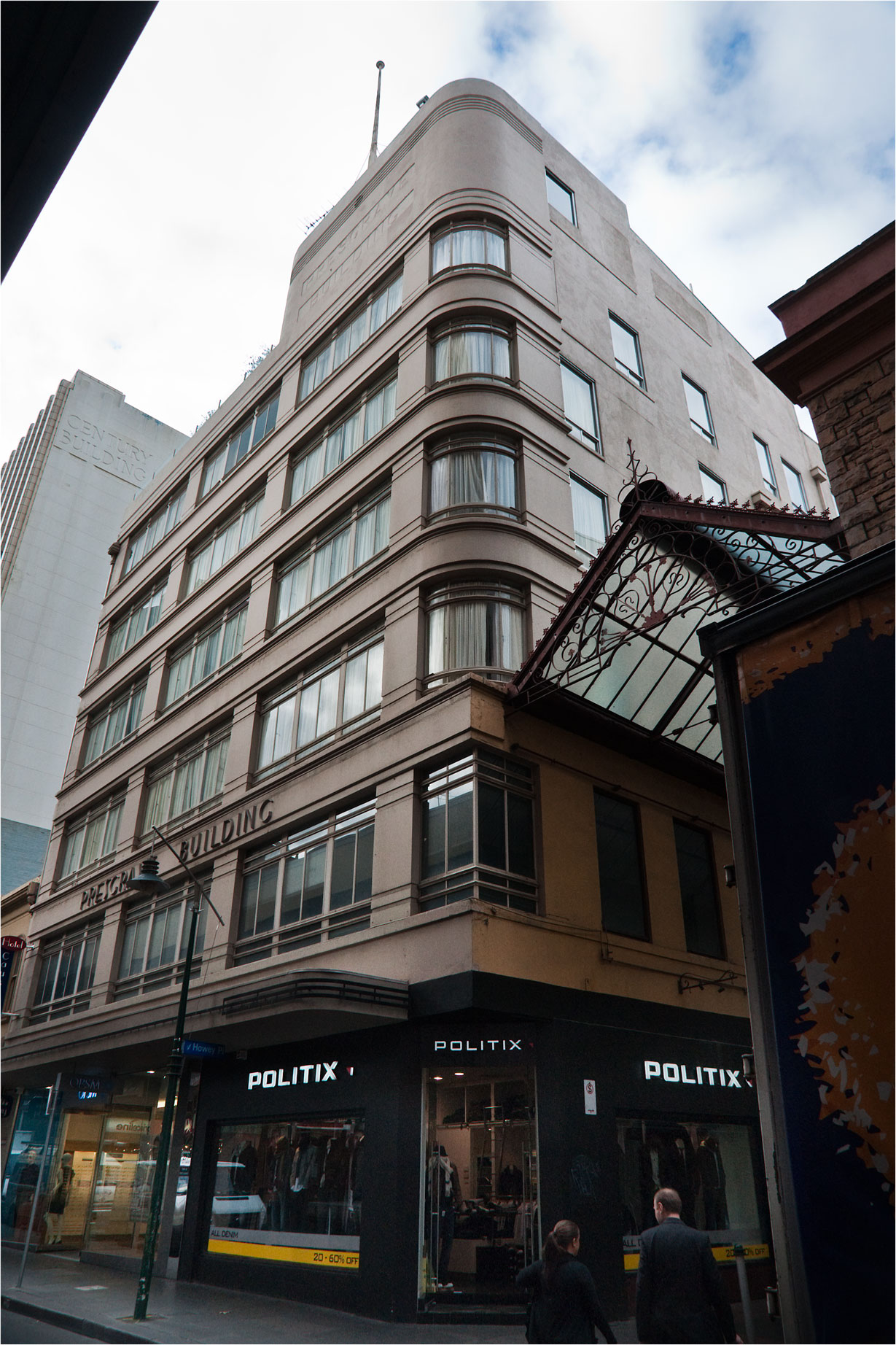
1938 Presgrave Building

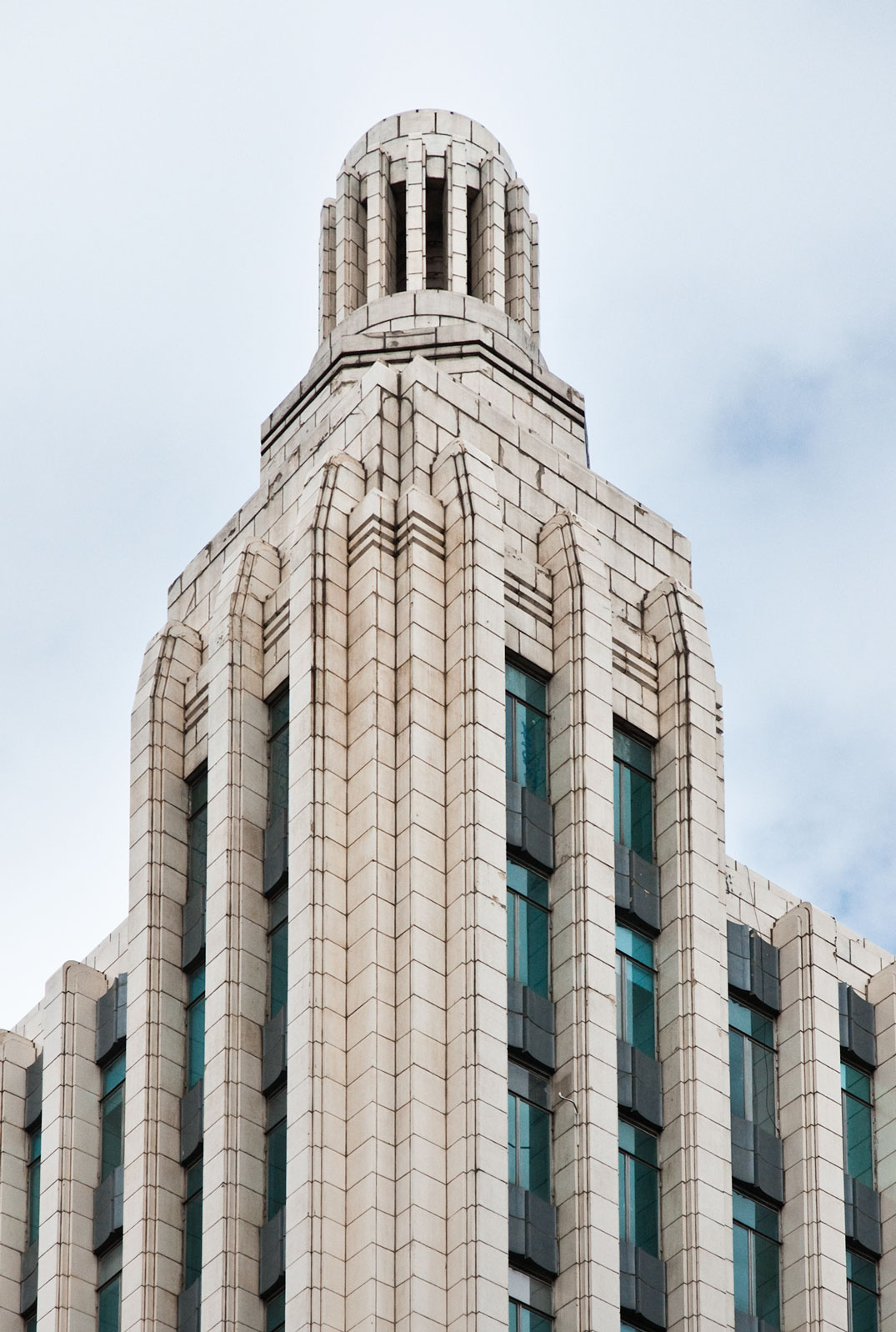
1938–1940 Century Building
