= Sydney T. Ellis =

American politician

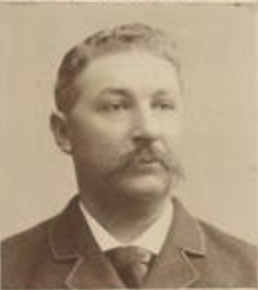

Member of the Virginia House of Delegates from Nansemond County
- In office December 4, 1889 – December 6, 1893
- Preceded by: John A. Browne
- Succeeded by: John E. Booker

Personal details
- Born: July 2, 1848
- Died: October 9, 1911 (aged 63)
- Resting place: Cedar Hill Cemetery, Suffolk
- Party: Democratic
- Spouse: Nannie Phillips

Sydney T. Ellis (July 2, 1848 – October 9, 1911) was an American politician who served in the Virginia House of Delegates. He later served as County Treasurer for Nansemond.

He and his wife had multiple children:

- Their son was named E. S. Ellis.
- Their daughter, Alma Ellis, studied in Paris and later married fellow student and Saxony-native Emil Hoernecke in November 1896.

Ellis died on October 9, 1911, and was buried at Cedar Hill Cemetery.
