= Red Men Museum and Library =

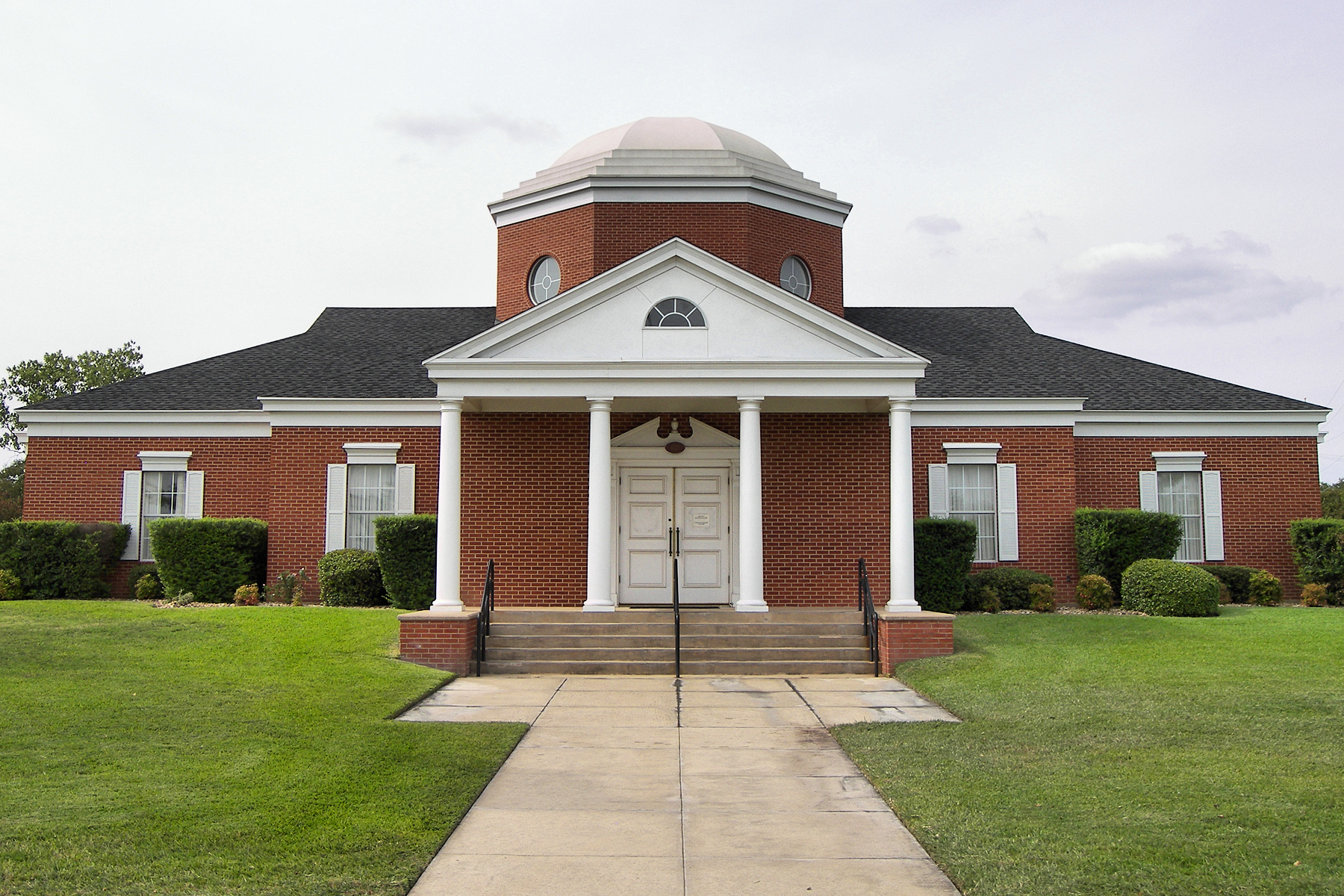
- The building design is inspired by Monticello

- Location within Texas
- Established: 1991
- Location: 4521 Speight Ave., Waco, Texas 76711, USA
- Coordinates: 31.5125152°N 97.1571081°W
- Type: history
- Visitors: 1,200
- Founder: Robert E. Davis
- Director: David Lintz
- Owner: Improved Order of Red Men
- Public transit access: Waco Transit System, Route 4-Colcord/VA
- Parking: On-site free parking
- Website: redmen.org/museum

The Red Men Museum and Library is an American history museum in Waco, Texas. It also houses the archives and presents the official history of the Improved Order of Red Men, a patriotic fraternal organization with traditions attributed to Native Americans.

== Organization ==
Robert E. Davis, the former national secretary for the Red Men, was an avid collector of both Red Men memorabilia as well as an eclectic collection of artifacts he had purchased at auction. He willed his collection to the organization which founded the museum in 1991.

The organization is incorporated as the Texas Red Men Foundation. The complex is home to both the headquarters of the national Red Men fraternal organization and the Great Council of Texas office. The Red Men Museum takes part in Texas Brazos Trail, a historical tourism effort by the state of Texas and is also a member of the Museum Association of Waco

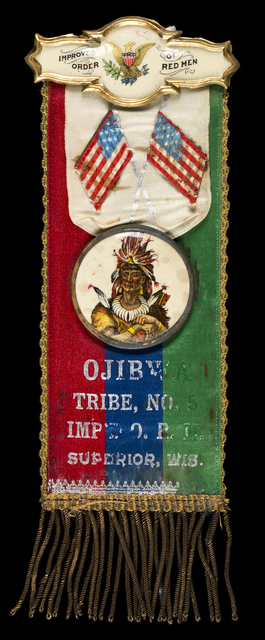
Historic ribbon, Ojibwe Tribe No. 5

== Collection ==
The collection consists of a very eclectic group of artifacts, mostly pertaining to American history. Included within the collection is a peace blanket from the Apache leader Geronimo, a bugle from the Gettysburg Battlefield, a writing desk belonging to Aaron Burr and moccasins from Chiricahua leader Cochise.

== Library ==
The museum houses a non-circulating archive of works available to the general public for study. In addition to Red Men organization documents, the collection contains historical documents relating to World War II, including the Nuremberg War Criminal Trial reports, and the complete Warren Commission report.

== Building ==
The museum is located near the Waco Independent School District football stadium and sports complex. The brick building is designed to look reminiscent of Thomas Jefferson's Monticello and also includes a hall and commercial kitchen for events.

== See also ==
- List of museums in Central Texas
- List of Improved Order of Red Men buildings and structures
