= Mohawk Trail =

- U.S. National Register of Historic Places
- U.S. National Historic Site
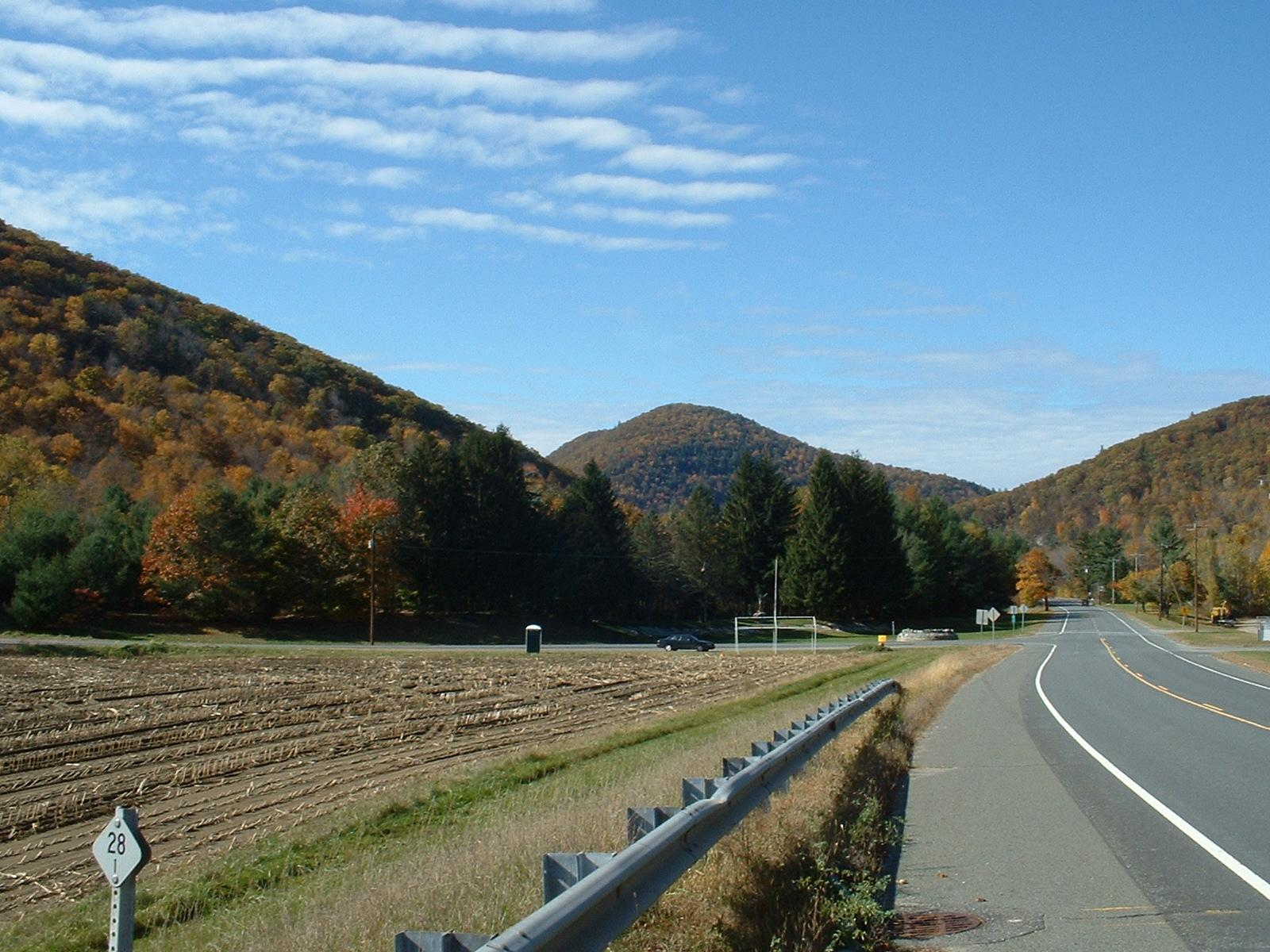
- The Mohawk Trail, with Todd Mountain in the background

- Location within Massachusetts Location within the United States
- Nearest city: Greenfield and North Adams, Massachusetts
- Coordinates: 42°38′27″N 72°57′13″W
- Area: 2,275 acres (921 ha)
- NRHP reference No.: 73000283
- Added to NRHP: April 03, 1973

The Mohawk Trail is a trail in Northern Massachusetts. The trail began as a Native American trade route which connected Atlantic tribes with tribes in Upstate New York and beyond. It followed the Millers River, Deerfield River and crossed the Hoosac Range, in the area that is now northwestern Massachusetts.

== Route ==
Today the Mohawk Trail is a part of Routes 2 and 2A, following much of the original Indian trail. The exact path of the trail is not officially defined, and there is some disagreement among various sources as to its endpoints. The broadest definition runs 75 miles (121 kilometers) from Athol, Massachusetts to the border with New York in Williamstown, Massachusetts, passing through the communities of Orange, Erving, Gill, Greenfield, Shelburne, Buckland, Charlemont, Savoy, Florida, and North Adams. However, other sources use a narrower definition, with the eastern terminus being in Millers Falls, Greenfield, or Charlemont. The trail is generally considered to follow Route 2A in the east (which diverges from Route 2 as it goes through the town centers of Athol, Orange, and Greenfield) and continue on Route 2 after Route 2A ends in Greenfield.

== Attractions ==
The modern day Mohawk Trail is considered one of the most beautiful drives in Massachusetts. The Berkshire mountains are clearly visible from several points. There are numerous points of interest along the way, including many scenic viewpoints, roadside attractions and gift shops. Of particular note is Hail to the Sunrise at Mohawk Park, a statue made in tribute to Native American heritage. A portion of the trail parallels the Deerfield River for several miles, and passes through the village of Shelburne Falls, and the Bridge of Flowers. The route crosses the Connecticut River via the historic French King Bridge at a height of 140 feet. The road reaches a high elevation of 2272 feet at Whitcomb Summit. On the western side of the summit there is the popular hairpin turn and lookout, overlooking the city of North Adams and the Taconic Mountains. On the eastern side, the highway descends steeply eastward from Whitcomb Summit down the slope of the Hoosac Range following the Cold River to the Deerfield River. Notable features include the infamous Dead Man's Curve.

A six-mile section of the Mohawk Trail was severely damaged by Hurricane Irene in August 2011. A considerable portion of the road is surrounded by the Mohawk Trail State Forest, a 6,400-acre (26 km^{2}) forest, known for its camping, and occasional encounters with bobcats and black bears. Within this area there is substantial acreage of old growth forest containing many of the tallest trees in Massachusetts as verified by the Eastern Native Tree Society. The route passes close to Vermont's southern border, and alternate routes travel north into Vermont to Harriman Reservoir and Ball Mountain State Park. The western terminus in Williamstown provides access to Mount Greylock, U.S. Route 7, and New York State Route 2.

A portion of the historic footpath route, running through Florida, Savoy, and Charlemont, from the confluence of the Cold and Deerfield Rivers up the Cold River valley to Wheeler Brook, was added to the National Register of Historic Places on April 3, 1973. This route, where the footpath itself is no longer extant in original form, is located on the north bank of the Cold River, with the modern roadway running along the south bank included in the listed area as an intrusion on the setting.

== Gallery ==
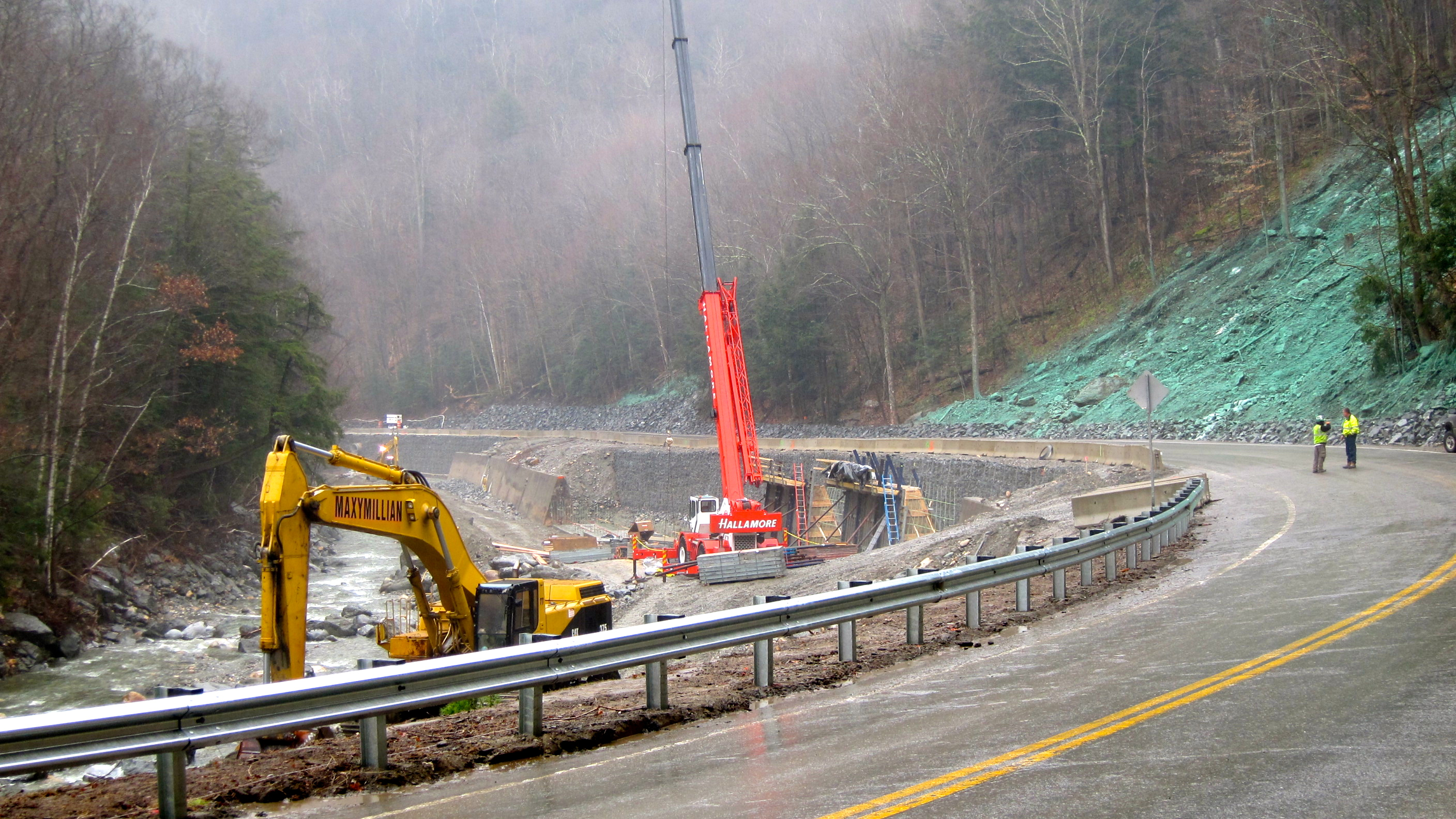
Repair of Route 2 after a 6-mile washout along the Cold River caused by Hurricane Irene.

The Elk On The Trail, Whitcomb's Summit

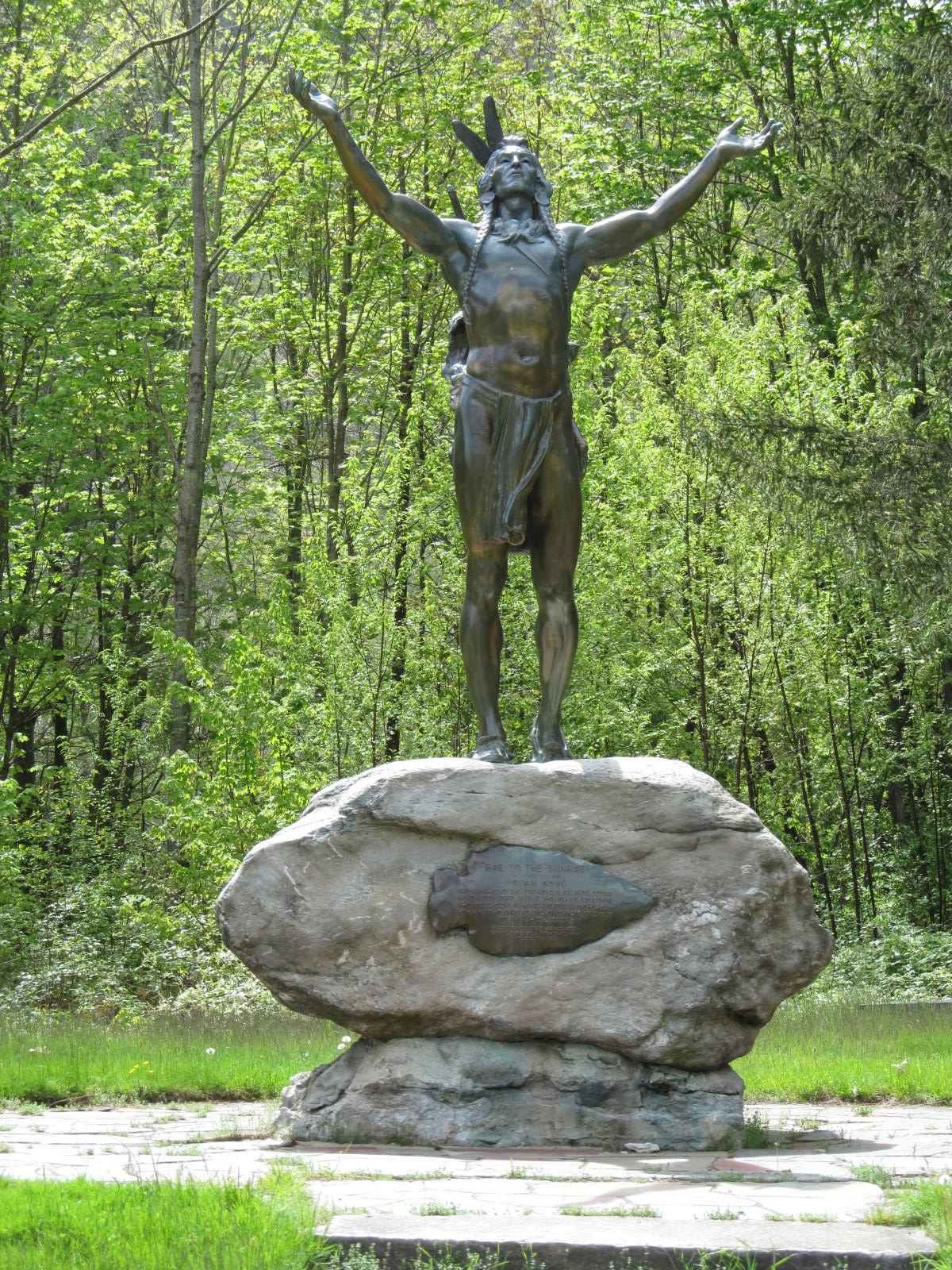
Hail to the Sunrise, Charlemont

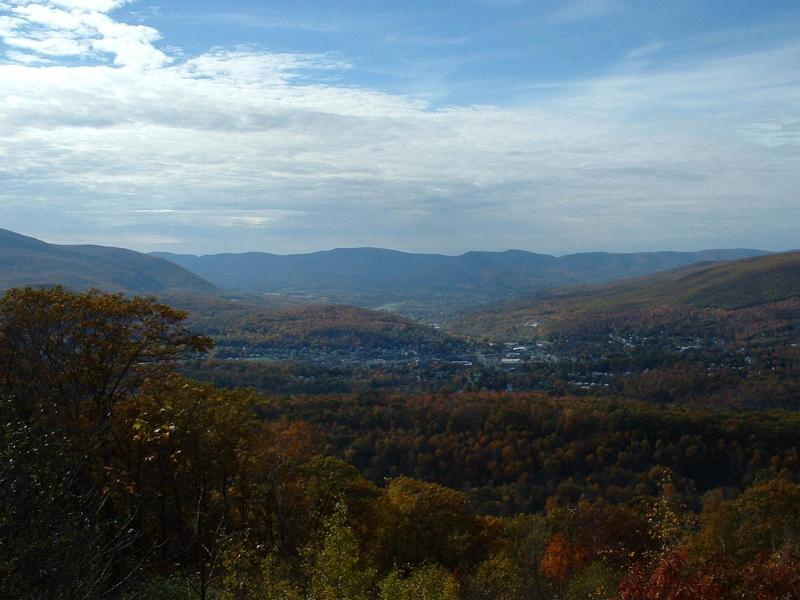
The Western Summit near the end of the Mohawk Trail, looking towards North Adams and the Taconic Range

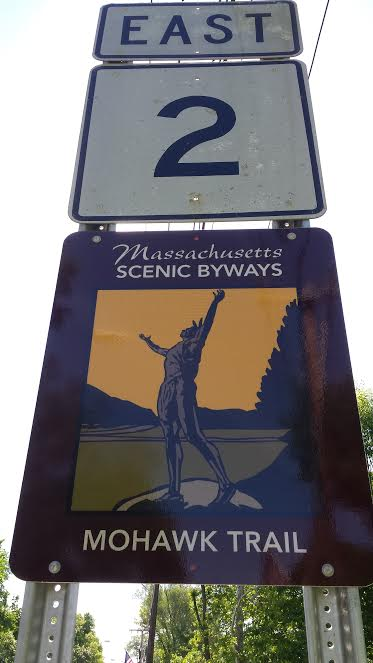
Massachusetts Route 2 at the beginning of the Mohawk Trail, Williamstown

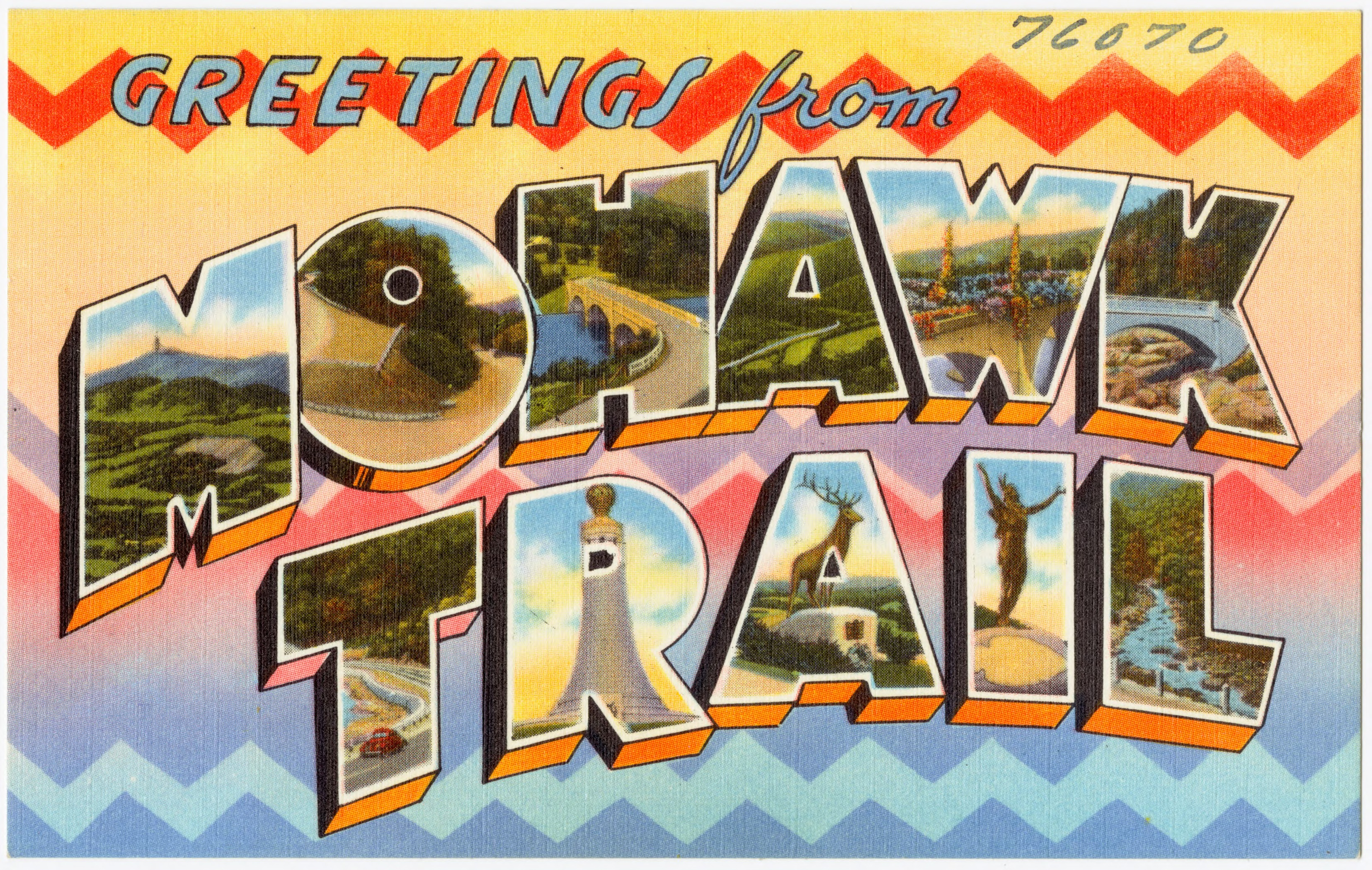
Tichnor Bros. large-letter postcard c. 1940

== See also ==
- National Register of Historic Places listings in Berkshire County, Massachusetts
