= Joseph Pollia =

Italian-born American sculptor

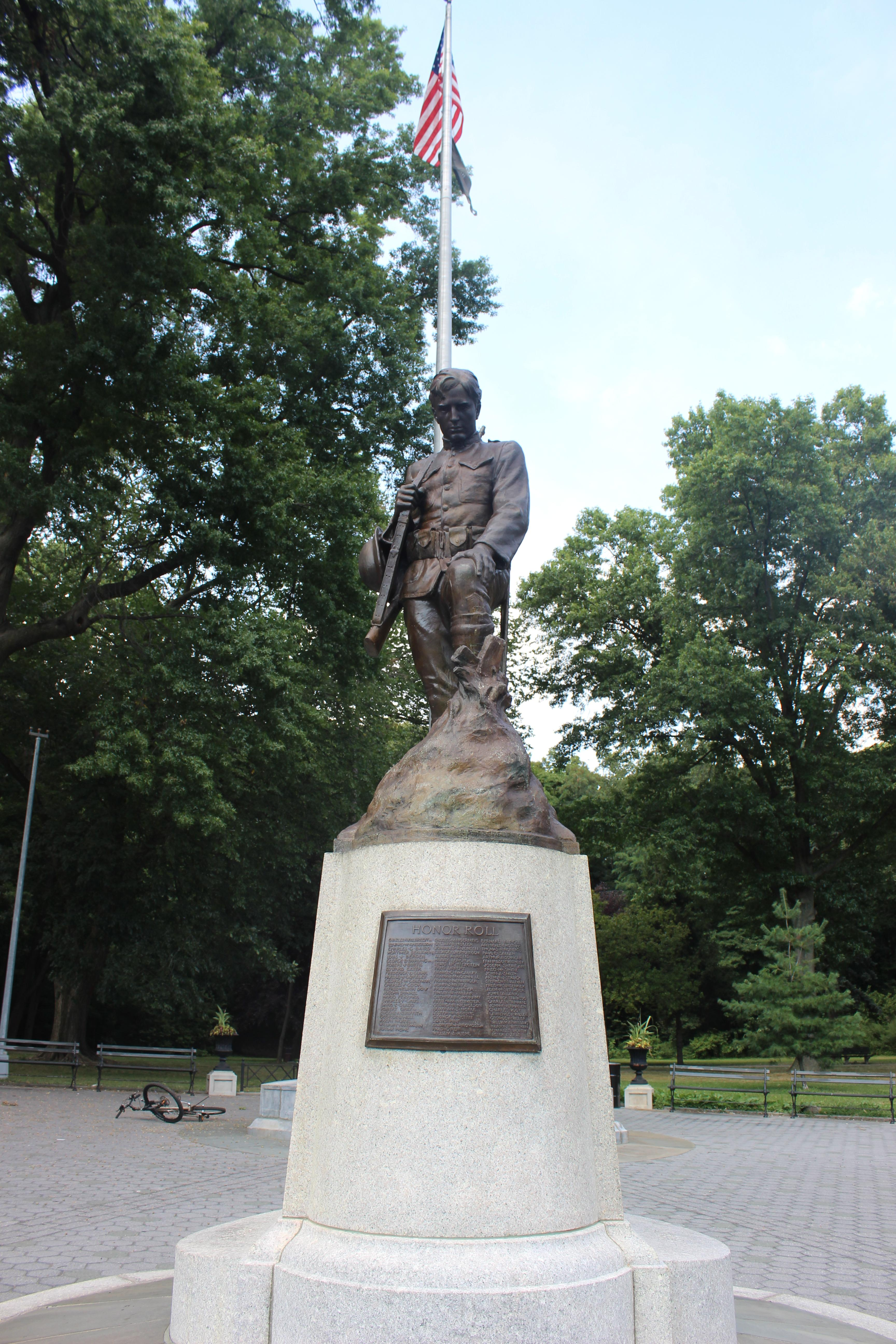
My Buddy (1925), Richmond Hill World War Memorial, Forest Park, Queens, New York City.

Joseph Pasquale Pollia (6 March 1894, Sicily, Italy – 12 December 1954, New York City) was an Italian-born American sculptor who created numerous monuments and war memorials.

== Biography ==
He and his family – parents Pasquale and Alexandra, and older sister Caterina – emigrated from Sicily to the United States in 1896, and settled in Boston, Massachusetts. His father worked as a barber at 21 High Street.

He studied with Bela Pratt at the School of the Museum of Fine Arts, Boston. He succeeded Joseph Bailey Ellis as director of the Modern School of Sculpture in Boston, and taught summer courses at the Sawyer's Island Art School in Boothbay, Maine.

He had an early success with his statue My Buddy (1925), for the Richmond Hill World War Memorial at Forest Park in Queens, New York City:

The memorial features a strapping soldier who takes a moment to stand before the grave of a lost comrade. His head is bowed in contemplation of a small cross protruding from a mound of dirt. A helmet hangs from his right arm, leaving his lowered head bare, and showing off thick locks of hair that fall in waves onto his forehead.

The soldier was reputedly modeled after silent movie star Francis X. Bushman. Replicas of the statue are in Storm Lake, Iowa; Tarrytown, New York; and Franklin, Massachusetts (as Mourning Doughboy).

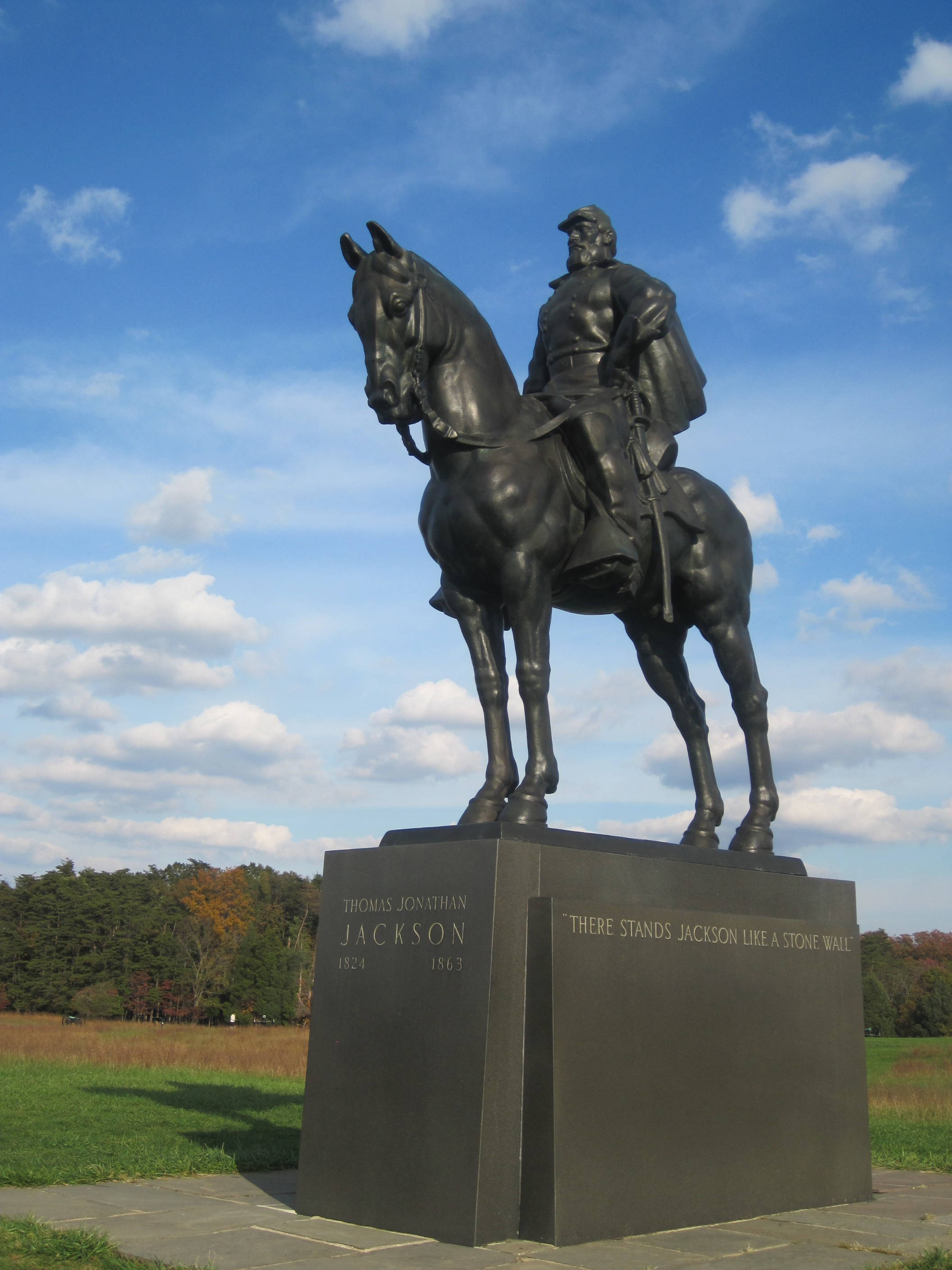
Stonewall Jackson Monument (1938-40), Manassas, Virginia.

His most famous work is the Equestrian statue of General Thomas "Stonewall" Jackson at Manassas National Battlefield Park, near Gainesville, Virginia. The Virginia Fine Arts Commission announced a design competition for the monument in 1938, and his winning submission was chosen from 80 entries in March 1939. The monument was dedicated August 31, 1940.

[A] Herculean Jackson sits tall upon an equally muscular horse as he gazes out across Henry Hill. He wears a cape that appears to be lifted by a dramatic wind, lending itself to his heroic stance. The large lettering on the base of the monument boldly declares, "There Stands Jackson Like a Stone Wall," referencing the words purportedly spoken by General Bernard Bee at the Battle of first Manassas, immortalizing Jackson with his nickname.

Pollia was a member of the Architectural League of New York and the National Sculpture Society, and exhibited at the 1929 NSS show. He was elected an academician of the National Academy of Design in 1953.

=== Death ===
News of his death was reported by several newspapers. He and his wife, Mary G. Anastasi, are buried together at Santa Clara Mission Cemetery in Santa Clara, California.

== Selected works ==
- Bust of Samuel C. Dobbs, Dobbs Hall, Emory University, Atlanta, Georgia, 1919-20.
- The Volunteer Fireman, Union County Courthouse, Elizabeth, New Jersey, 1925.
- Major Nicholas Stoner, Nick Stoner Municipal Golf Course, Caroga, New York, 1929.
- Brigadier General Casimir Pulaski Monument, Utica, New York, 1930.
- Shekilammy (Iroquois chief), Conrad Weiser Park, Womelsdorf, Pennsylvania, 1930.
  - Replica: Hail to the Sunrise, Mohawk Park, Charlemont, Massachusetts, 1932.
- Youth, James Lane Allen Fountain, Gratz Park, Lexington, Kentucky, 1933.
- John Brown, John Brown Farm State Historic Site, Lake Placid, New York, 1935.
- Admiral Robert E. Peary Monument, Admiral Peary Park, Cresson, Pennsylvania, 1937. Peary's birthplace is nearby.
- Monsignor Joseph Jessing, Pontifical College Josephinum, Worthingon, Ohio, 1938.
- 9 bas-relief panels, Governor Joseph A. Wright Quadrangle, Indiana University, Bloomington, Indiana, 1949:
  - Justice, Philosophy, Drama, Art, Science, Baseball, Football, Basketball, Track & Field
- 5 Maquettes, San Jose Museum of Art, San Jose, California, undated.

=== War memorials ===
- My Buddy, Richmond Hill World War Memorial, Forest Park, Queens, New York City, William Van Alen, architect, 1925.
  - Replicas: Chataqua Park, Storm Lake, Iowa, 1927; Tarrytown, New York, 1927; Franklin Common, Franklin, Massachusetts, 1929.
- Civil War Soldier, Lincoln Park, Jersey City, New Jersey, 1926.
- World War I Doughboy, Glen Cove Library, Glen Cove, New York, William Van Alen, architect, 1926.
- Spanish–American War Memorial, San Juan Hill, Santiago de Cuba. Pollia created statues honoring both the American and Cuban soldiers who died there:
  - 71st New York Infantry Memorial, 1926.
  - A la Gloria del Mambi Victorioso (Cuban Memorial), 1929.
- Rockaway Beach World War Memorial, Queens, New York, 1927.
  - Replica: World War I Monument, North Park, Barre, Massachusetts, 1929.
- Spanish War Memorial, Greenfield, Massachusetts, 1928.
  - Replica: Spanish–American War Monument, Iowa Veterans Home, Marshalltown, Iowa, 1930.
- World War I Memorial, Milford, Connecticut, 1928.
- Spanish War Memorial, Church Green, Stoneham, Massachusetts, 1928.
- Suffolk and Nansemond World War Monument, Cedar Hill Cemetery, Suffolk, Virginia, 1929.
- It Shall Not Be Again, World War I Memorial, Veterans' Memorial Park, Orange, Massachusetts, 1934.
- World War I Monument, George C. Marshall Memorial Plaza, Uniontown, Pennsylvania, 1936.
- Sheridan Memorial, Christopher Street Park, Manhattan, New York City, 1936.
- Lynn World War I Memorial, Pine Grove Cemetery, Lynn, Massachusetts, 1937.
- Stonewall Jackson Monument, Manassas National Battlefield Park, Manassas, Virginia, 1938-40.
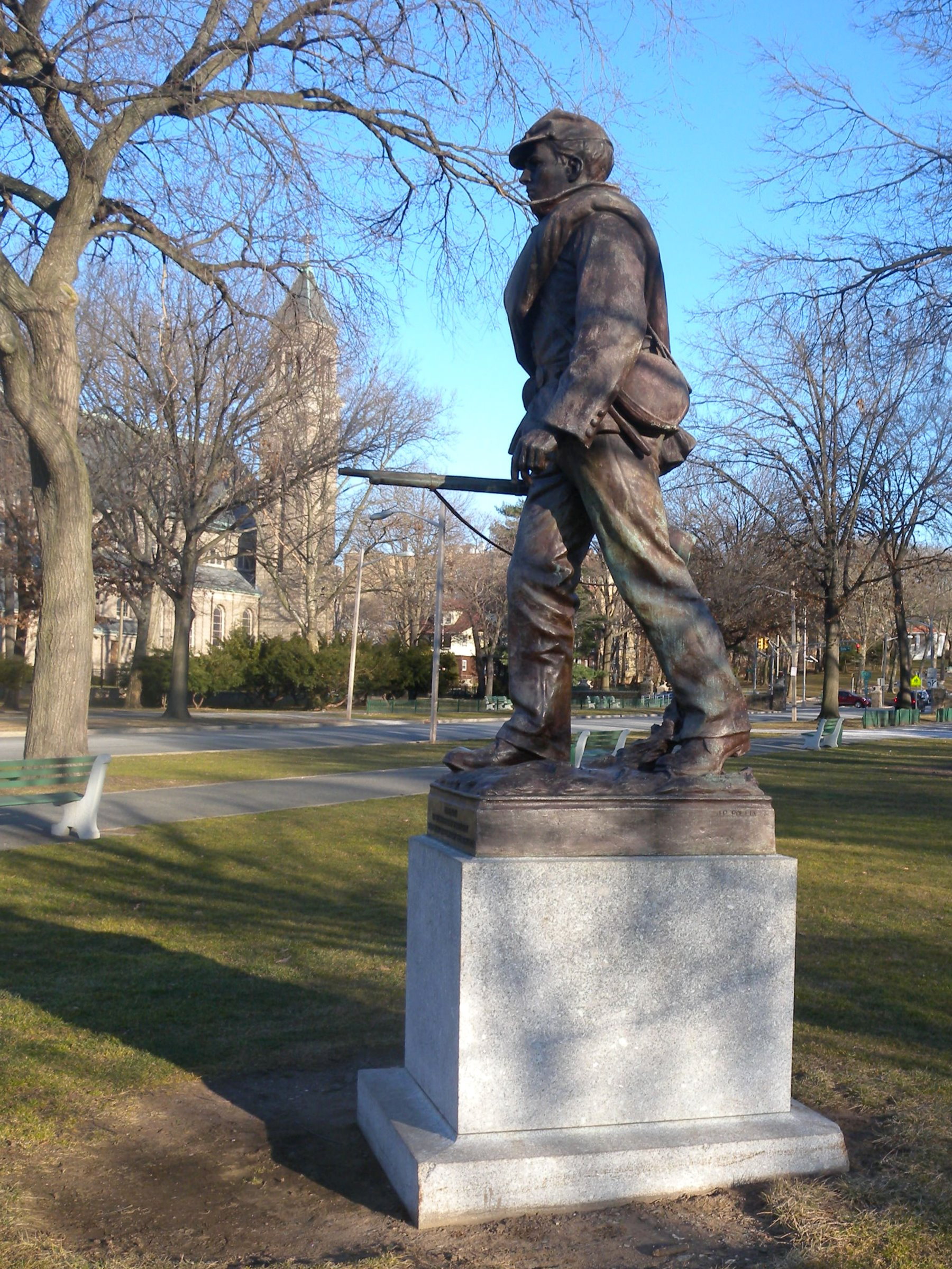
Civil War Soldier (1926), Jersey City, New Jersey.

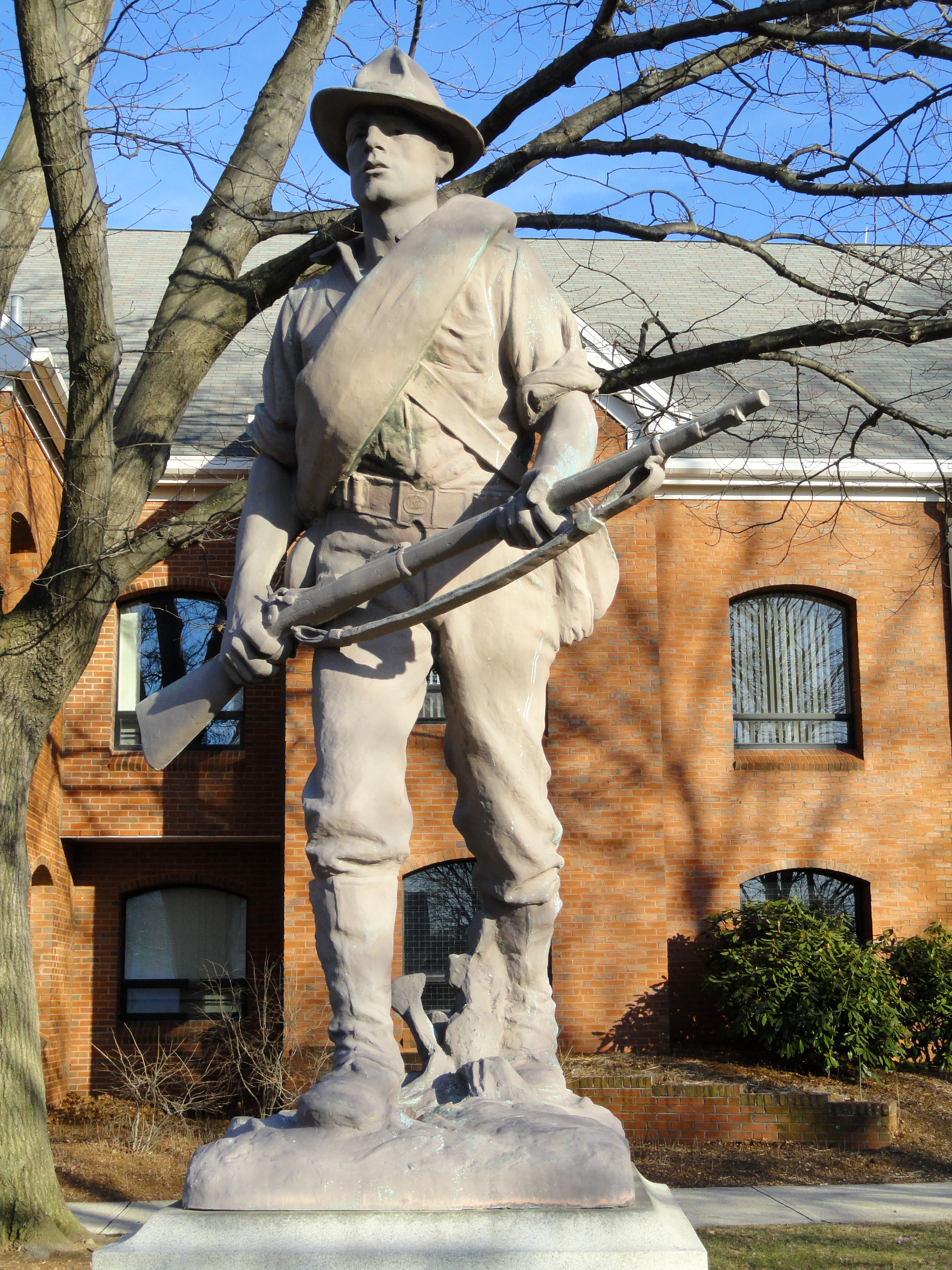
Spanish War Memorial (1928), Stoneham, Massachusetts.

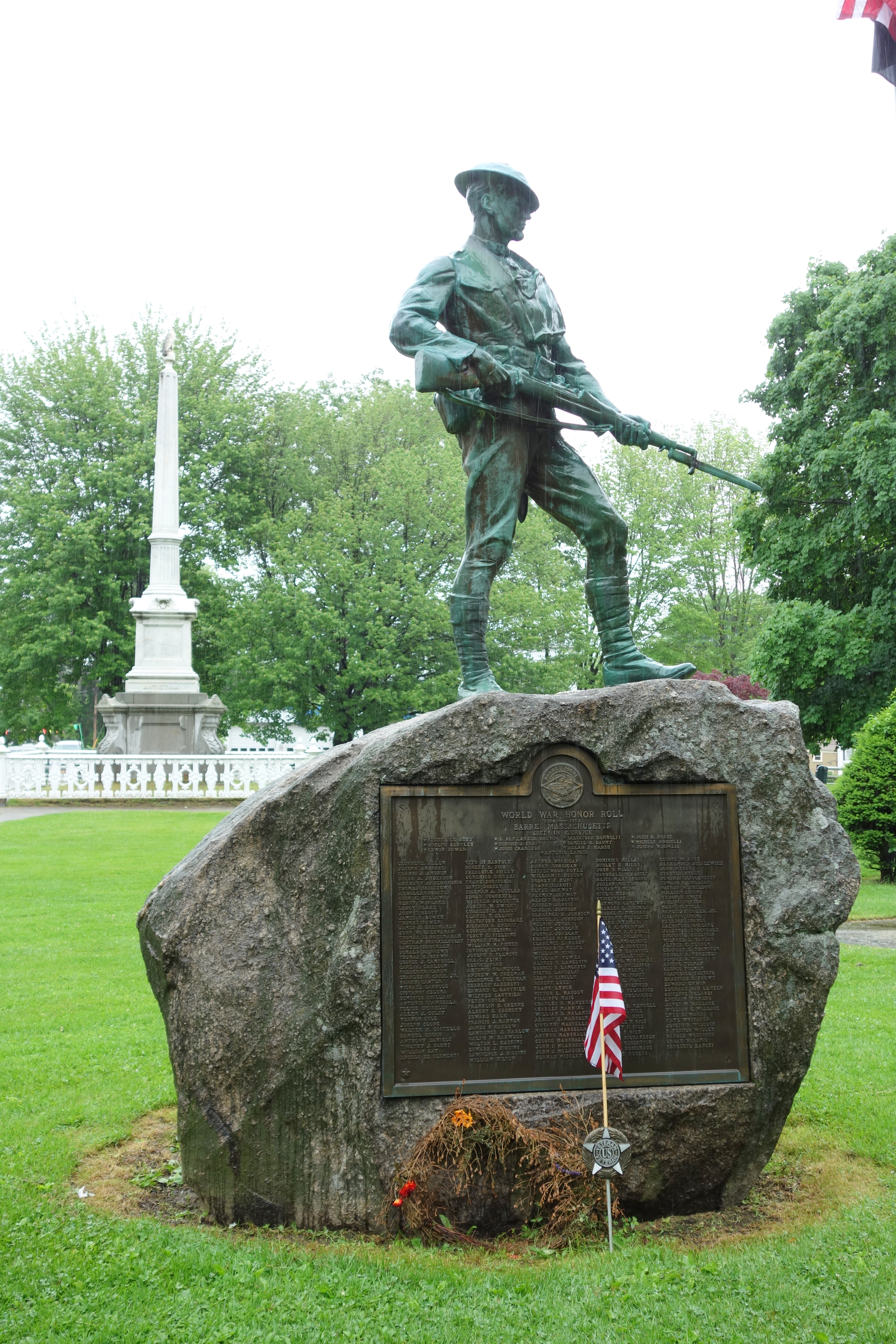
World War I Monument (1928–29), Barre, Massachusetts.

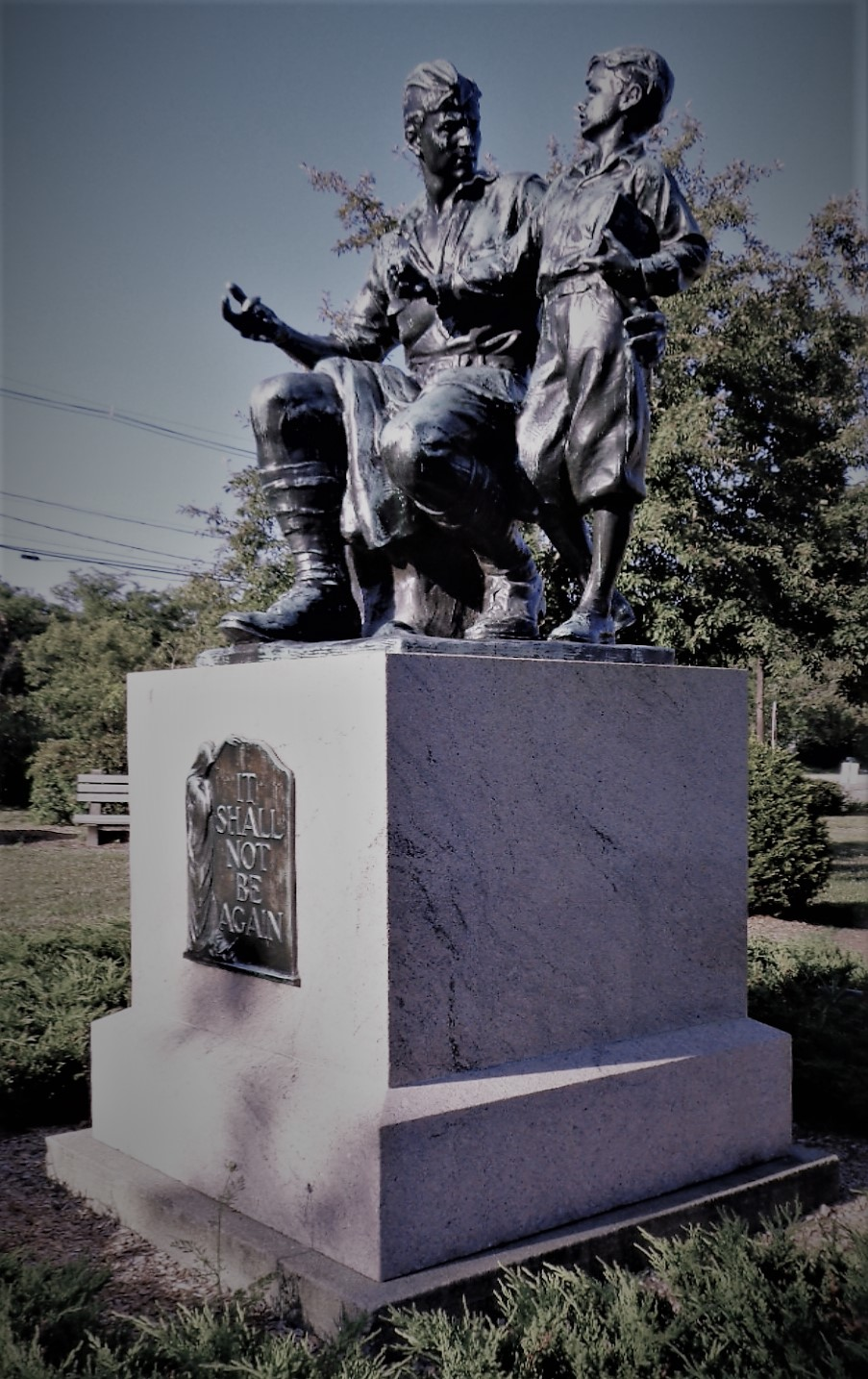
It Shall Not Be Again (1934), Orange, Massachusetts.

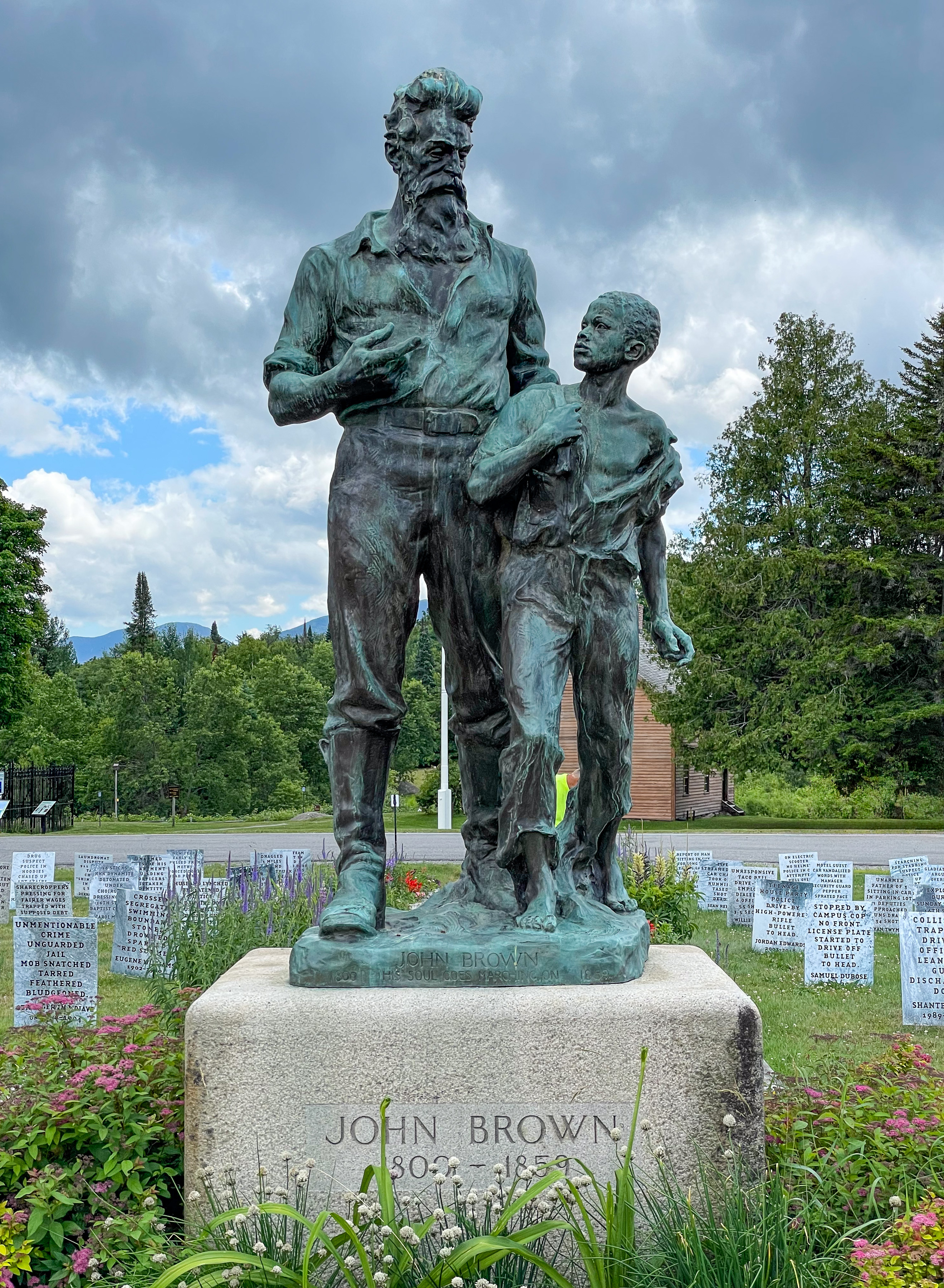
John Brown (1935), North Elba, New York.

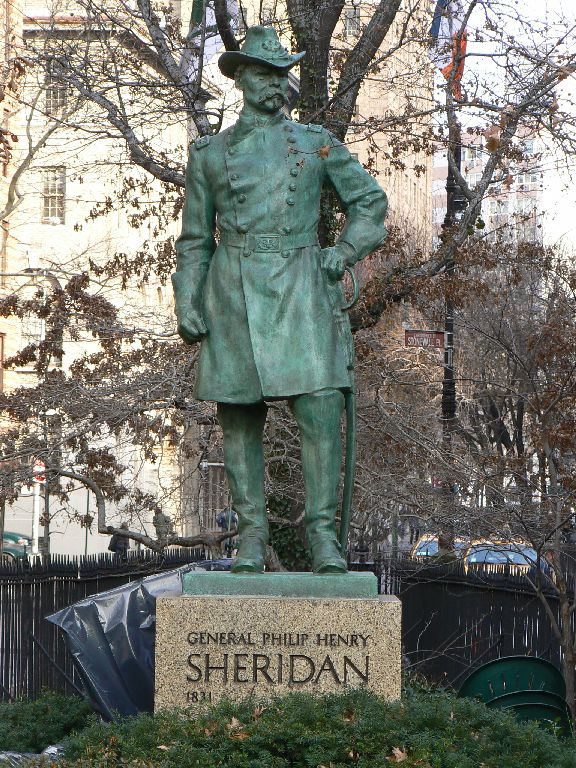
Sheridan Memorial (1936), New York City.

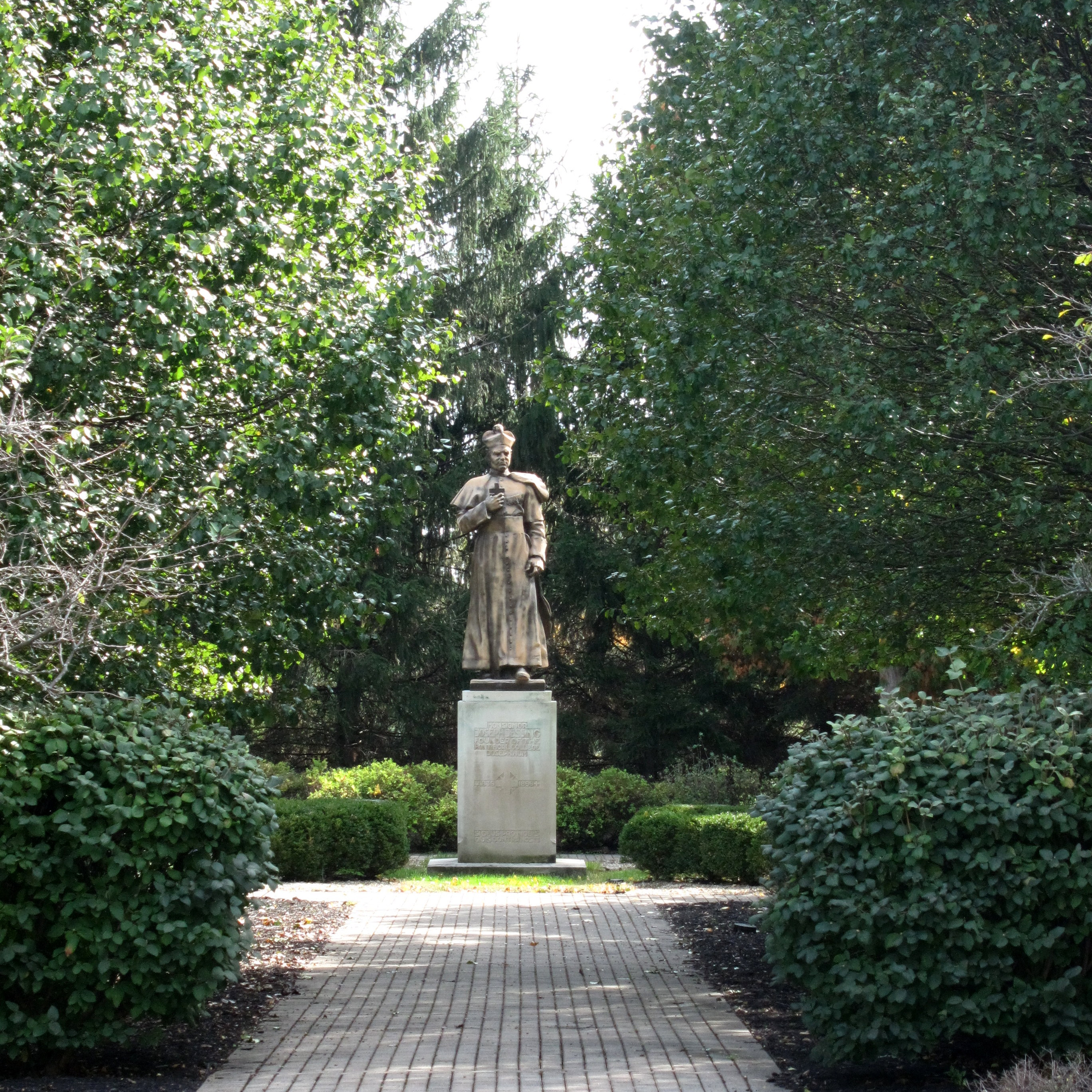
Monsignor Joseph Jessing (1938), Worthington, Ohio.
