= Thomas H. Barnes =

American politician and physician (1831–1913)

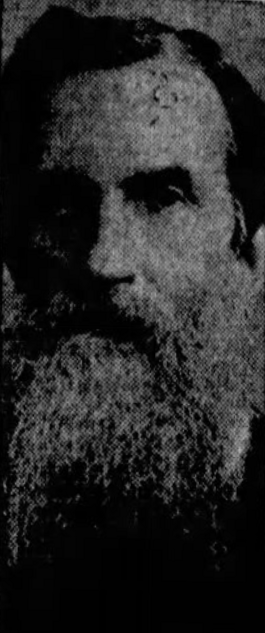
- Barnes in 1913 newspaper

Personal details
- Born: May 28, 1831
- Died: June 4, 1913 (aged 82) Suffolk, Virginia, U.S.
- Resting place: Cedar Hill Cemetery; Suffolk, Virginia, U.S.
- Education: University of Virginia
- Alma mater: University of Virginia School of Medicine (MD)
- Occupation: Politician; physician

Thomas H. Barnes (May 28, 1831 – June 4, 1913) was an American politician and physician from Virginia. He served as a member of the Virginia House of Delegates and the Virginia Senate.

== Early life ==
Thomas H. Barnes was born on May 28, 1831, to Elizabeth and James Barnes. His father was a farmer, magistrate and member of the county court. Barnes attended Kinsale Academy in Nansemond County and Buckhorn Academy in Hertford County, North Carolina. He attended the University of Virginia starting in 1849 for three years. He graduated from the University of Virginia School of Medicine in 1853 with a Doctor of Medicine.

== Career ==
Barnes worked as a physician from 1854 to 1888.

Barnes served as a member of the Virginia House of Delegates and Virginia Senate. He was a delegate to the state constitutional convention in 1901.

Barnes served as a member of the board of visitors of the University of Virginia School of Medicine. He was also a member of the board of visitors of the College of William & Mary. He served as chairman of both boards at the time of his death.

== Personal life ==
Barnes did not marry. Barnes lived in Suffolk (then part of Nansemond County).

Barnes died on June 4, 1913, at his home in Suffolk. He was buried at Cedar Hill Cemetery in Suffolk.
