= National Haymakers' Association =

American general fraternal organization

The National Haymakers' Association was a side degree of the Improved Order of Red Men, similar perhaps to the Shriners within Freemasonry. Meeting places were titled Haylofts. Sometimes the meeting halls of the Redmen served as Haylofts. Offices had titles like "Collector of Straws" and "Guard of the Barn Door", and candidates for initiation were styled "Tramps" and were overseen by a "Boss Driver".

The side degree was founded in 1879, and had 10,000 members as late 1980. The NHA was said to have a typical fraternal oath and its initiation ritual reflected Masonic influence. The titles and terminology of the group included referring to its meeting place as a "Hayloft", its secretary as "Collector of the Straws" and treasurer as "Keeper of the Bundles". The two sentinels were the "Guard of the Hayloft" and the "Guard of the Barndoor".

== Origin ==
"You are not to act as mere drivers, but as advisors; you are servants, not masters".

It is unknown why the founders of the appendant degree chose to model themselves after the business of haymaking. However, as forage, hay is a vital component of the world's agricultural system, especially within the United States and at the time that this order flourished. In 1912 in Texas, for example, 387,000 acres (1,570 km^{2}) of hay were harvested, yielding a total value of $3,557,000 (unadjusted). 1912 is also the year that the Texas Haymakers' Association, apparently a purely agri-industry interest group, was founded. Other state haymaker commercial groups existed at various times, and the National Haymakers' Association may have derived its name as a reference to them.

== See also ==
- Sons of Liberty
