= Improved Order of Red Men =

American fraternal organization

- Symbol: Totem of the Eagle (TOTE); Motto: Freedom, Friendship, & Charity

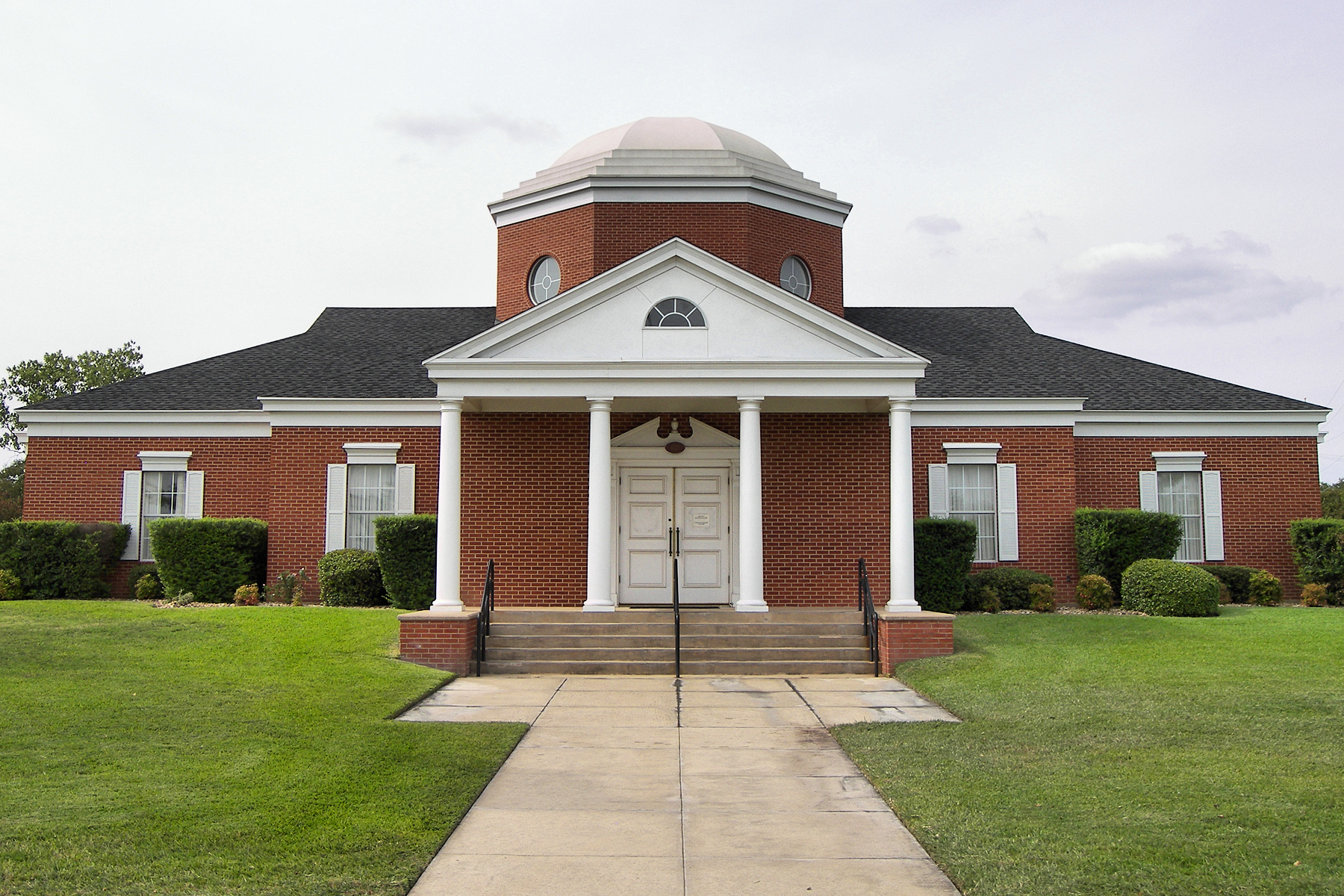
- Improved Order of Red Men Museum and Library, Waco, Texas
- Predecessor: Sons of Liberty (claimed); Society of Red Men (c. 1813)
- Formation: 1834; 192 years ago
- Founded at: Baltimore
- Type: Fraternal
- Purpose: Patriotism, charity, friendship
- Headquarters: Waco, Texas
- Website: redmen.org

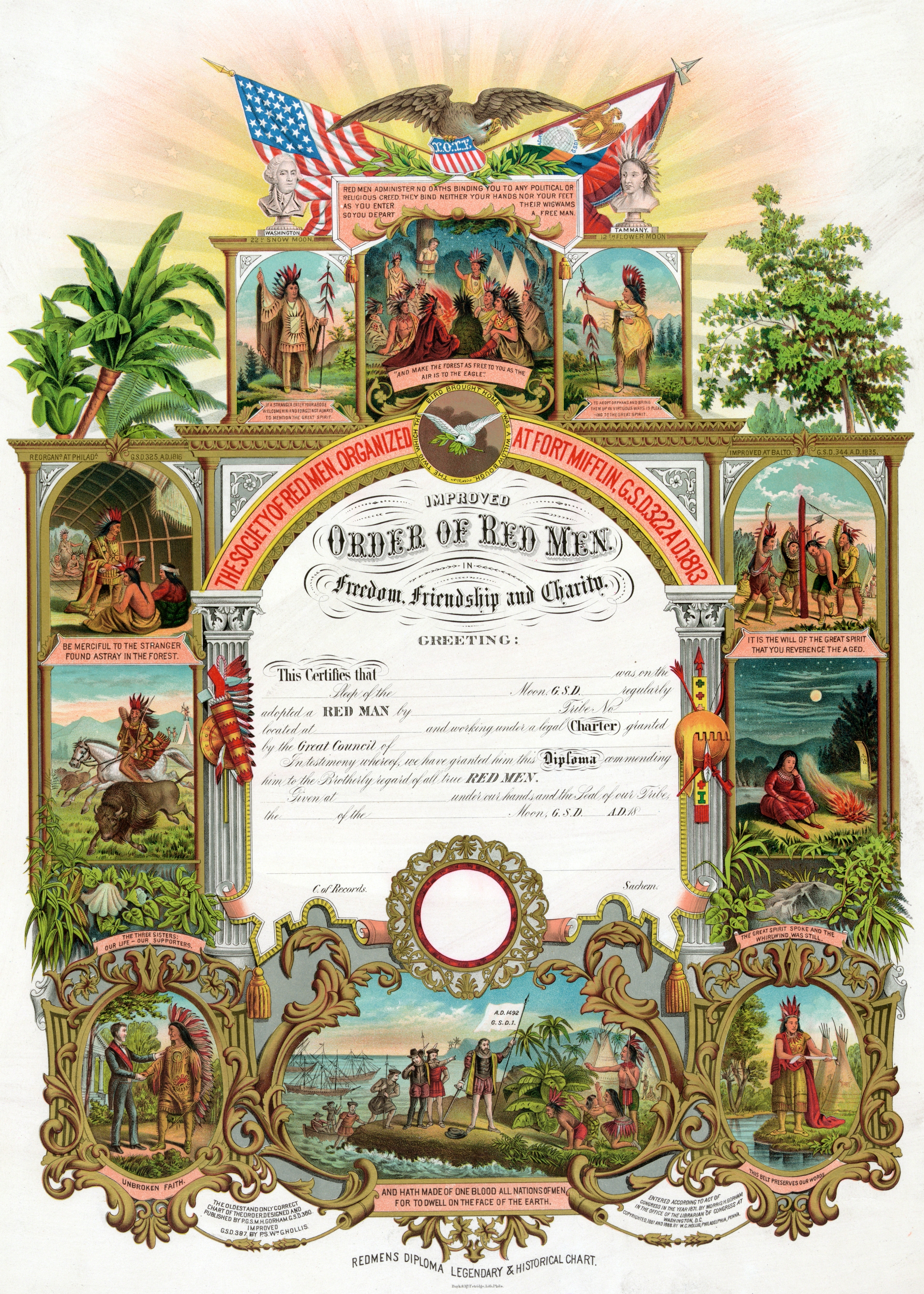
Improved Order of Red Men membership certificate, 1889, with busts of Washington and Tammany, and vignettes of imagined scenes of Native American life and cultures.

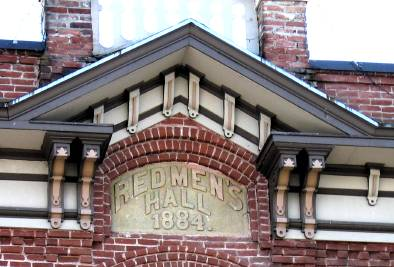
Red Men's Hall, Jacksonville, Oregon

The Improved Order of Red Men is a fraternal organization established in North America in 1834. It claims direct descent from the colonial-era Sons of Liberty. Their rituals and regalia are modeled after those assumed by men of the era to be used by Native Americans. Despite the name, the order was formed solely by, and for, white men. This whites-only rule was part of their bylaws until 1974, when the all-white clause was eliminated. Their current position is that they are now open to people of all ethnic backgrounds. In 1935, the organization claimed a membership of about half a million; by 2011, it had declined to a little more than 15,000.

The IORM sought to preserve Native American culture for a future when Indians went extinct.

== History ==
On December 16, 1773, a group of male colonists who were members of the Sons of Liberty met in Boston to protest the Tea Act. When their protest went unheeded, they disguised themselves as Mohawks, proceeded to Boston Harbor, and dumped overboard 342 chests of tea in what became known as the Boston Tea Party. In the late 18th century, the Tammany Societies, named after Tamanend, were formed. The most well-known of these was New York City's Society of St. Tammany, which grew into a major political machine known as "Tammany Hall." For the next 35 years, the Sons of Liberty and the Sons of St. Tamina groups went their own way, under many different names.

Around 1813, a disenchanted group created the philanthropic "Society of Red Men" at historic Fort Mifflin in Philadelphia. The organization grew in the 1820s. Parallel lines of advancement were offered in the Order of Red Men: a series of military titles and a set of “Indian rankings.” Class and ethnic differences introduced by new immigrants, anti-Masonic persecutions, attacks on fraternal groups based on excessive drinking, and, ultimately, a widespread cholera epidemic in 1832 led to the decline of the organization.

In 1834, the idea was revived in Baltimore The Improved Order of Red Men (IORM) focused on temperance, patriotism and American history. In 1835, the two groups (called "tribes") organized a larger IORM. Unlike the original Order, the IORM uses only expanded Native American titles. Rather than the public display of Native American costumes, the IORM uses its regalia in private gatherings. In 1886, its membership requirements were defined in the same pseudo-Indigenous phrasing as the rest of the constitution:

Sec. 1. No person shall be entitled to adoption into the Order except a free white male of good moral character and standing, of the full age of twenty-one great suns, who believes in the existence of a Great Spirit, the Creator and Preserver of the Universe, and is possessed of some known reputable means of support.

In one 1886 "tribe", weekly meetings were held on Friday nights. Each member's weekly dues of 12 cents went into a fund that was used to pay disability benefits to members at a rate of about "three fathoms per seven suns" ($3/week) for up to "six moons" (6 months) and then $2 a week. Some medical care ("a suitable nurse") was available, and also a death benefit of $100. The fund was invested in bonds, mortgages, and "Building Association Stock".

Early IORM groups tried to imitate Iruoquois and Algonquian culture, which had ostensibly been wiped out by colonial insurgents.

In 1908, the national Great Council passed a law barring saloonkeepers, bartenders, and liquor dealers from becoming members.

=== Minnesota ===
The first Minnesotan "Minnehaha tribe" lodge was established in 1875. The "Reservation" established 53 chapters by its peak in 1901, and reached a peak membership of 4,941 by 1903. The Minnesota chapter also emphasized patriotism and protecting "constitutional liberties" as duties of IORM members.

Throughout the 1860s and 1870s, after the U.S.-Dakota War of 1862, white Minnesotans had poor associations with Native Americans, and only during the 1880s did the IORM began to grow. By 1888, two more "tribes" were established in Minneapolis. In April 1895, there were eleven chapters in Minnesota, including five each in Minneapolis and Saint Paul, and one in Stillwater. There were 605 registered members between all chapters. The Minnesota Great Council was established in May 1895, and approved by the national Great Council. In 1900, 26 new chapters were created.

As of 2023, the Minnesota order exists as a combined Reservation with Wisconsin, including chapters in Red Wing, St. Peter, Winona, and Fond du Lac. Since 1919, no new chapters of the IORM have been established in Minnesota.

== Organization ==
The Order has a three-tiered structure. Local units are called "tribes" and are presided over by a "Sachem" and a board of directors. Local meeting sites are called "Wigwams". The state level is called the "Reservation" and governed by a "Great Sachem" and "Great Council" or "Board of Chiefs". The national level is the "Great Council of the United States".

The Great Council consists of the "Great Incohonee" (president), and a "Board of Great Chiefs", which includes the "Great Senior Sagamore" (first vice-president), "Great Junior Sagamore", "Great Chief of Records" (secretary), "Great Keeper of the Wampum" (treasurer) "Prophet" (past president), and "sannap" (appointed functionary). The headquarters of the Order has been in Waco, Texas, since at least 1979. They maintain an official museum and library in Waco, Texas.

Original degrees of IORM members included "adoption", "hunter", "warrior", and "chief". In 1898, the "hunter" position was discontinued. Degrees were administered by degree teams, who gave lectures about degree works.

IORM income came from quarterly dues; initiation, degree, and other fees; and income from dinners, dances, and other public social events. IORM budgets went towards rental or mortgage payments, fees owed to state councils, sick and funeral benefits, etc.

=== Auxiliaries and side degrees ===
A side degree of the order was founded in 1890 as the National Haymakers' Association. There was also once a uniformed division called the Knights of Tammany, as well as a group called the Chieftains League, which consisted of members who had been exalted to the Chief Degree (see below) and were in good standing within their respective "tribes".

In 1952, the Order created the Degree of Hiawatha, as a youth auxiliary for males 8 and up. Most of the members of the Degree of Hiawatha were concentrated in New England. In 1979 there were less than 5,000 members in approximately 125 "Councils".

The Order female auxiliary is the Degree of Pocahontas and dates to the 1880s and the Degree of Anona, a junior order of the Degree of Pocahontas, was formed in 1952.

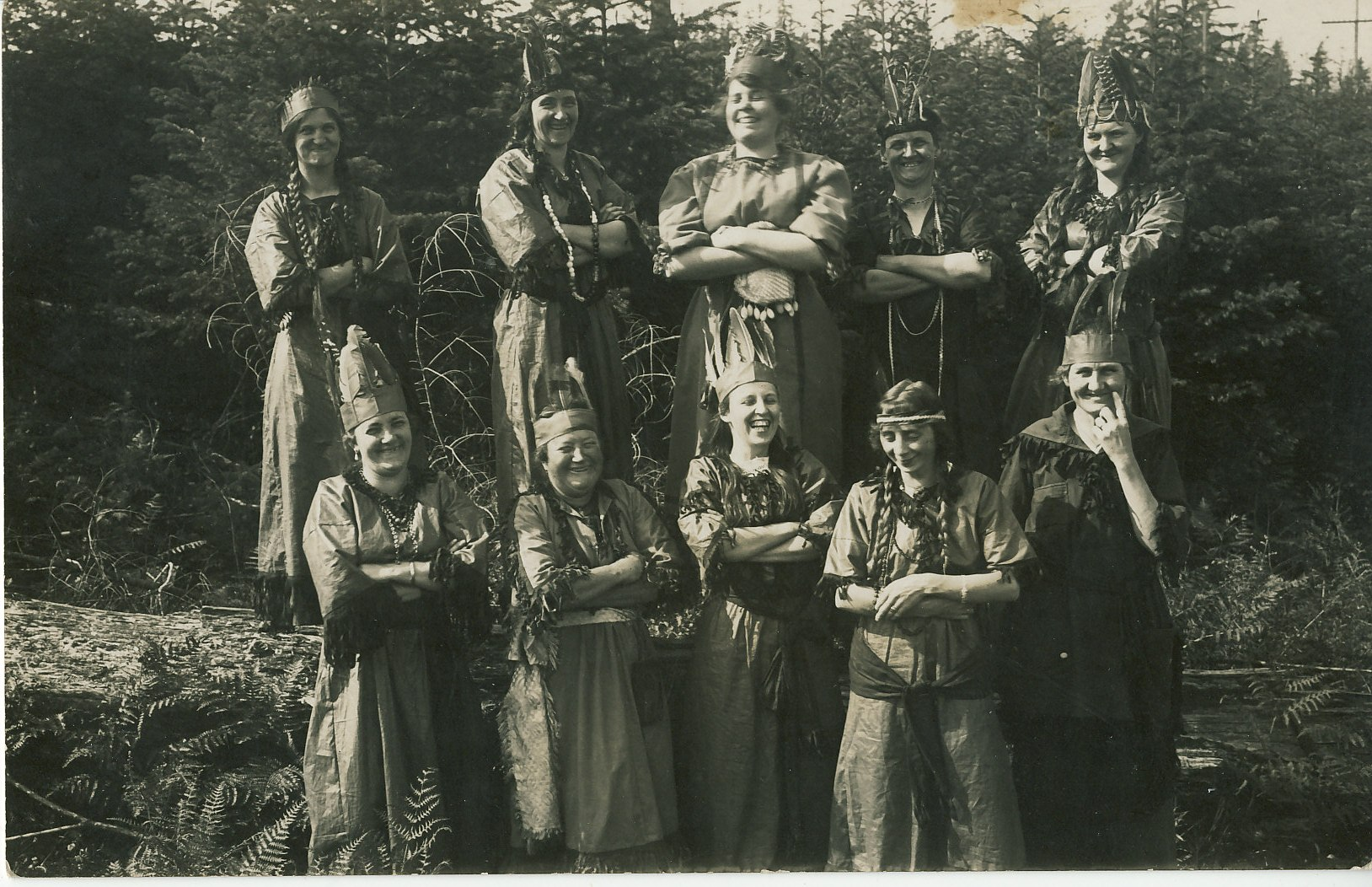
Pocahontas Degree

== Membership ==
Members were obligated to stand for the "benevolence and protection" of fellow members. They were compelled to visit the sick, relieve the distressed, bury the dead in a "respectful Christian burial", educate orphans, assist widows, and keep an "open, keyless treasury for deserving charity". As of the 1903 national constitution, members had to "believe in a Supreme Being", be "of sound mind and body", have reputable means of support, be between 18 and 50 years old (with exceptions), be a U.S. citizen, be able to "speak and understand English", and to have been a state resident for at least six months prior to application.

The Improved Order of the Red Men grew in membership in the late 19th century. It reached 519,942 members in forty-six states in 1921, but had declined to 31,789 in 32 states in 1978 and to 15,251 by 2011.

IORM recruitment targeted middle class, white-collar men. Native Americans and mixed race people were not allowed to join, although exceptions may have occurred. Until 1974, the Order was officially open to whites only. That year the 106th Great Council of the United States eliminated the all-white clause in what was called a "turning point for the order". In the present-day, the Improved Order of Red Men is open to people of all ethnic backgrounds.

== Rituals ==
The order itself claims direct descent from the Sons of Liberty, noting that the Sons participated in the Boston Tea Party dressed as their idea of "Indians". Thus, they continue to dress as "Indians" and use Native American terminology, despite being a non-Native organization.

The group's ritual terminology is derived from language they believe is used by Native Americans, though it also shows the influence of Freemasonry. Outsiders are called "Palefaces", to open a meeting is called "kindling the fire", officers' installations are called "Raising up of Chiefs" and voting is called "twigging". The Masonic influence is seen in the three basic degrees– Adoption, Warrior and Chief. There is also a fourth degree, Beneficiary, for insurance.

Regalia included clothing and sashes which displayed the degrees of officers.

=== Calendar system ===
Originally, the society used the Hebrew Anno Mundi system for calendar year numbering when dating their documents, rather than Anno Domini (AD). In 1865 AD a new system was devised and adopted, known as the "Great Sun of Discovery" (GSD). The first year of the system, known as GSD 1, was the year that Christopher Columbus arrived in the Americas, namely 1492 AD. In this system, years were known as "great suns" and months were called "moons", each with their own epithet, e.g. "Cold Moon" for January, but the length of these years and months conformed to the conventional Gregorian calendar.

== Philanthropy and positions ==
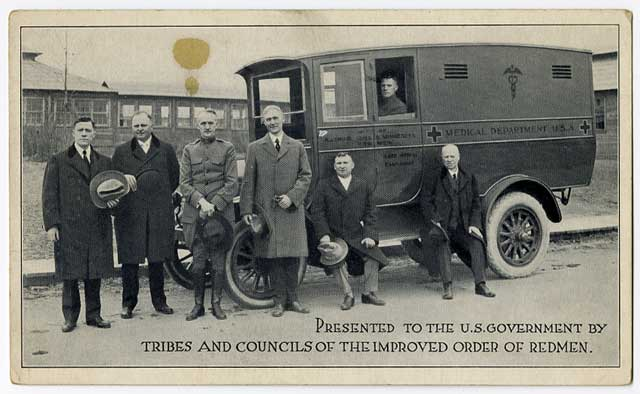
Improved Order of Red Men donating an ambulance to the United States government

The order has historically opposed federal welfare programs, waste in government, and Communism. However, there are examples of substantial socialist participation in the organization in pockets of the United States; for example, in southern West Virginia, during the 1910s buildup to the West Virginia coal wars, "the Improved Order of Red Men [was] the most comfortable lodge for Socialist miners and other radical workers."

After the Civil War in West Virginia, the Improved Order of Red Men became a fraternal organization of some notoriety for vigilante activity. The Red Men Act, West Virginia's anti-conspiracy law, was passed in response to a groundswell of such violence. Occasionally, vigilantes wore red masks.

The IORM supported the founding of the Society of American Indians in 1911 and helped organize the SAI's first two conferences.

== Offshoots ==
=== Independent Order of Red Men ===
In 1850, the German-language, "Metamora Tribe of Baltimore", refused to pay a benefit, even though the Great Councils of Maryland and the United States decided that it was legal and proper for them to do so. The group then surrendered its charter and formed a new, German-speaking Independent Order of Red Men. It asked the other German-language groups (or Stamms) to join the new group, but few did so. The Independent Order had a height of 12,000 members, though in the 1880s many Stamms returned to the Improved Order. It still existed in 1896, but according to Albert C. Stevens it gave "no sign of vigorous growth". In the early 1920s, Arthur Preuss could not get into contact with them, but felt it probably still existed.

=== Afro-American Order of Red Men ===
In 1904, another group called the Independent Order of Red Men emerged in Virginia, this time composed entirely of African Americans. When the Improved Order objected to the use of the name, the leader of the group, R. M. Spears, had the charter withdrawn and renamed the group the "Afro-American Order of Red Men and Daughters of Pocahontas". The Virginia IORM still apparently considered an injunction against the new group, but it is unclear how the episode turned out. A Tribe #23 based in Metompkin, Virginia is attested by the existence of a ribbon badge in the collection of Theda Skocpol, suggesting that the group had at least 23 local "tribes" in the state. The badge is identical to the ones worn by the IORM, except with the AAORM initials.

== Analysis ==
Edward J. Pluth argued that the IORM is an example of adult men "playing indian", reaffirming white supremacy by showing native life subservient to colonial culture. Pluth, Mark Carnes, and W.S. Harwood, have said that fraternal societies like the IORM may have allowed Victorian era men control over their masculinity. Social, business, economic, and personal connections may have also compelled men to become members.

== Gallery ==
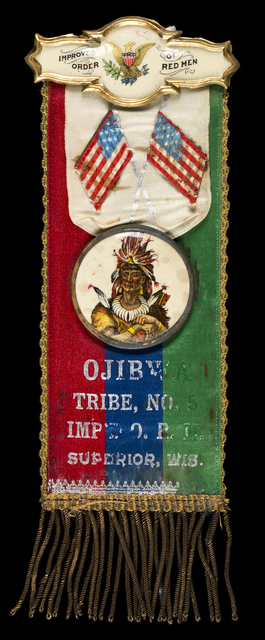

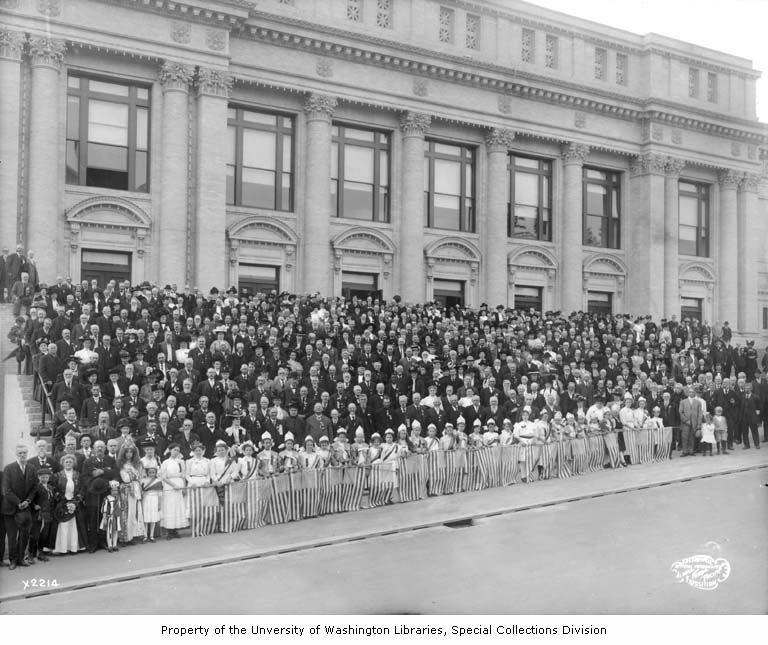

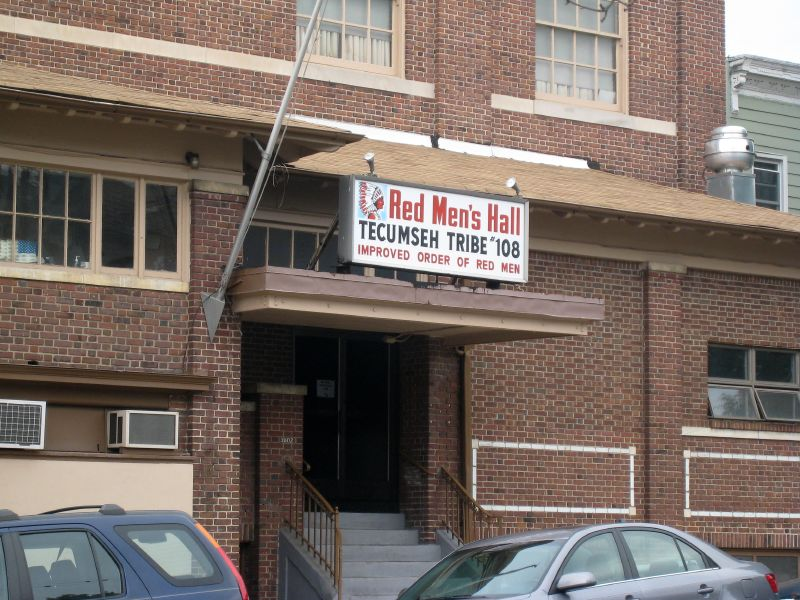

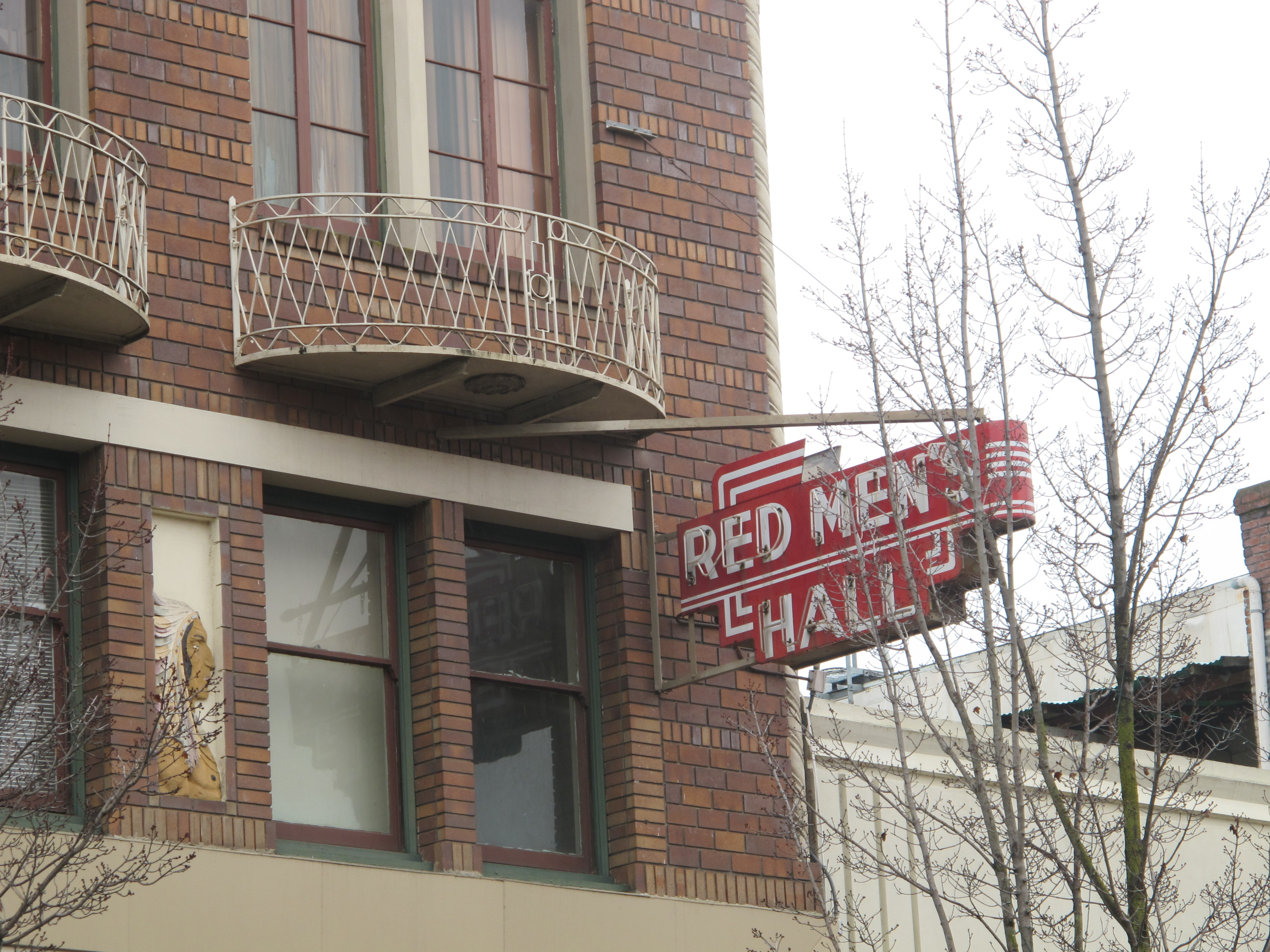

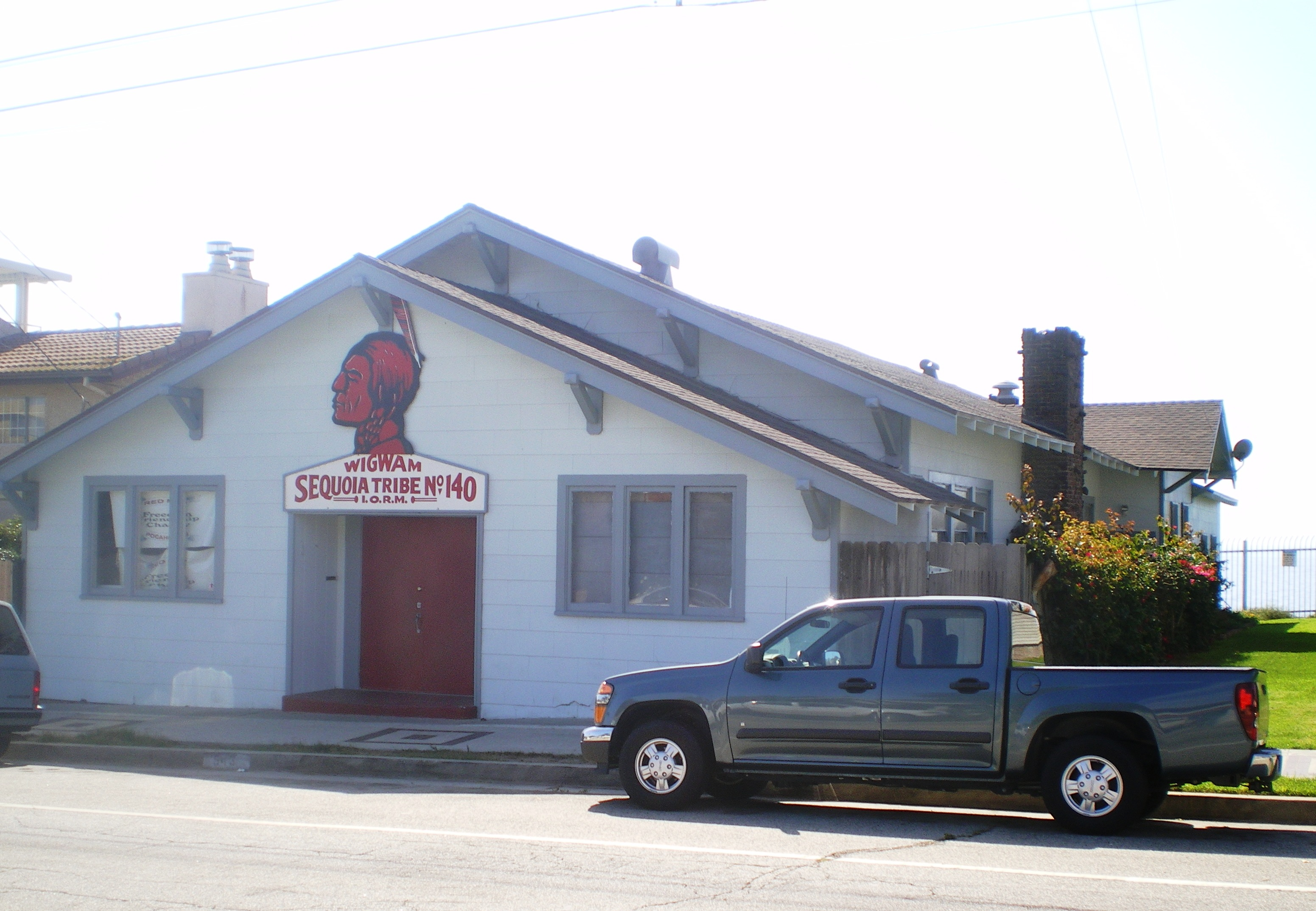

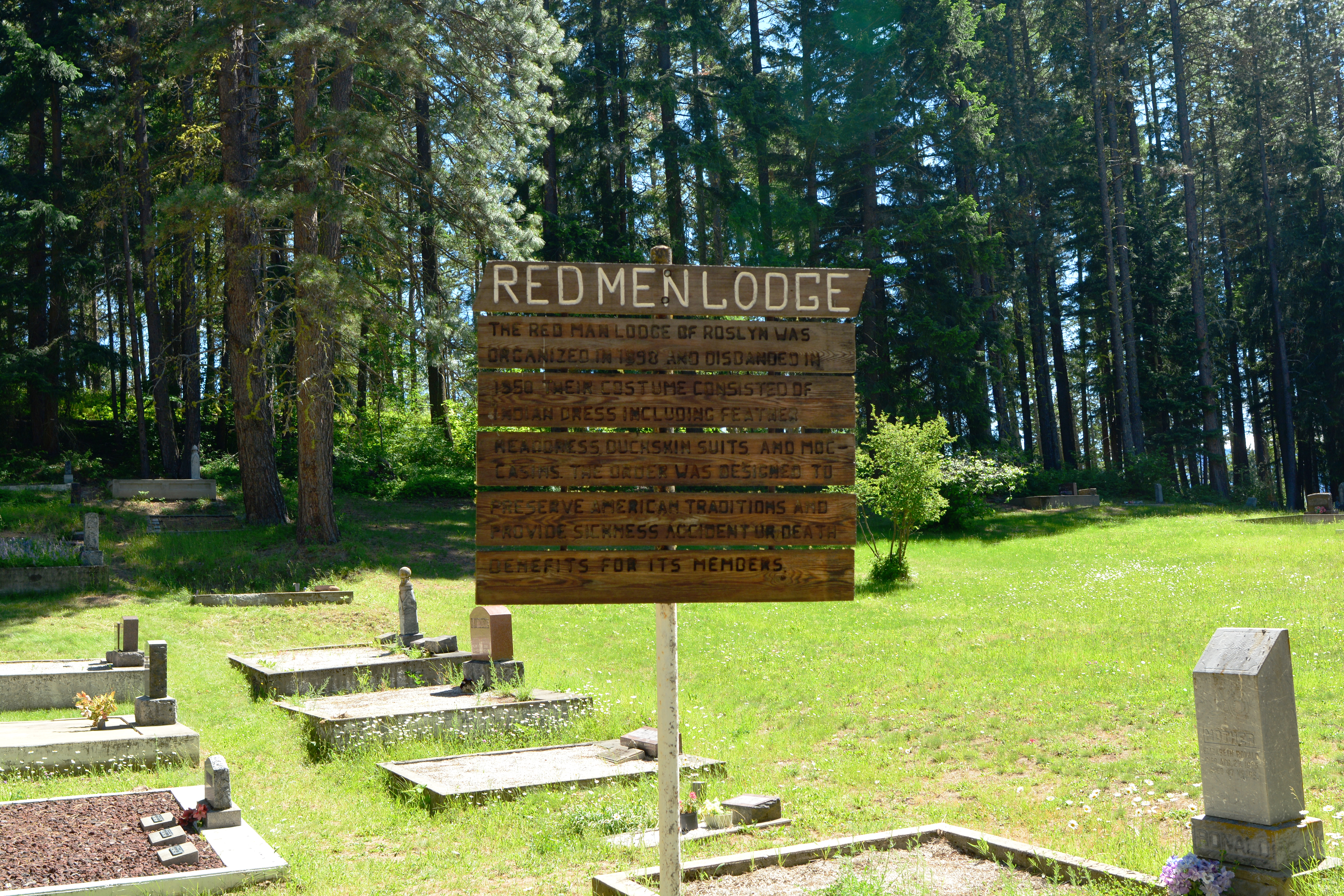

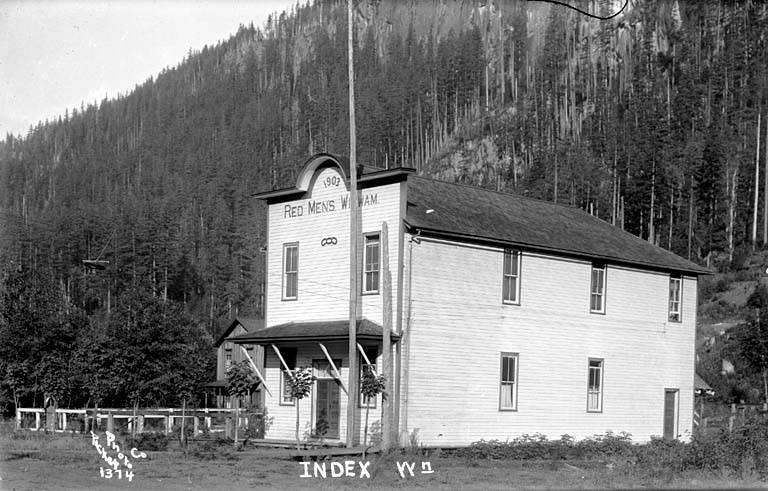

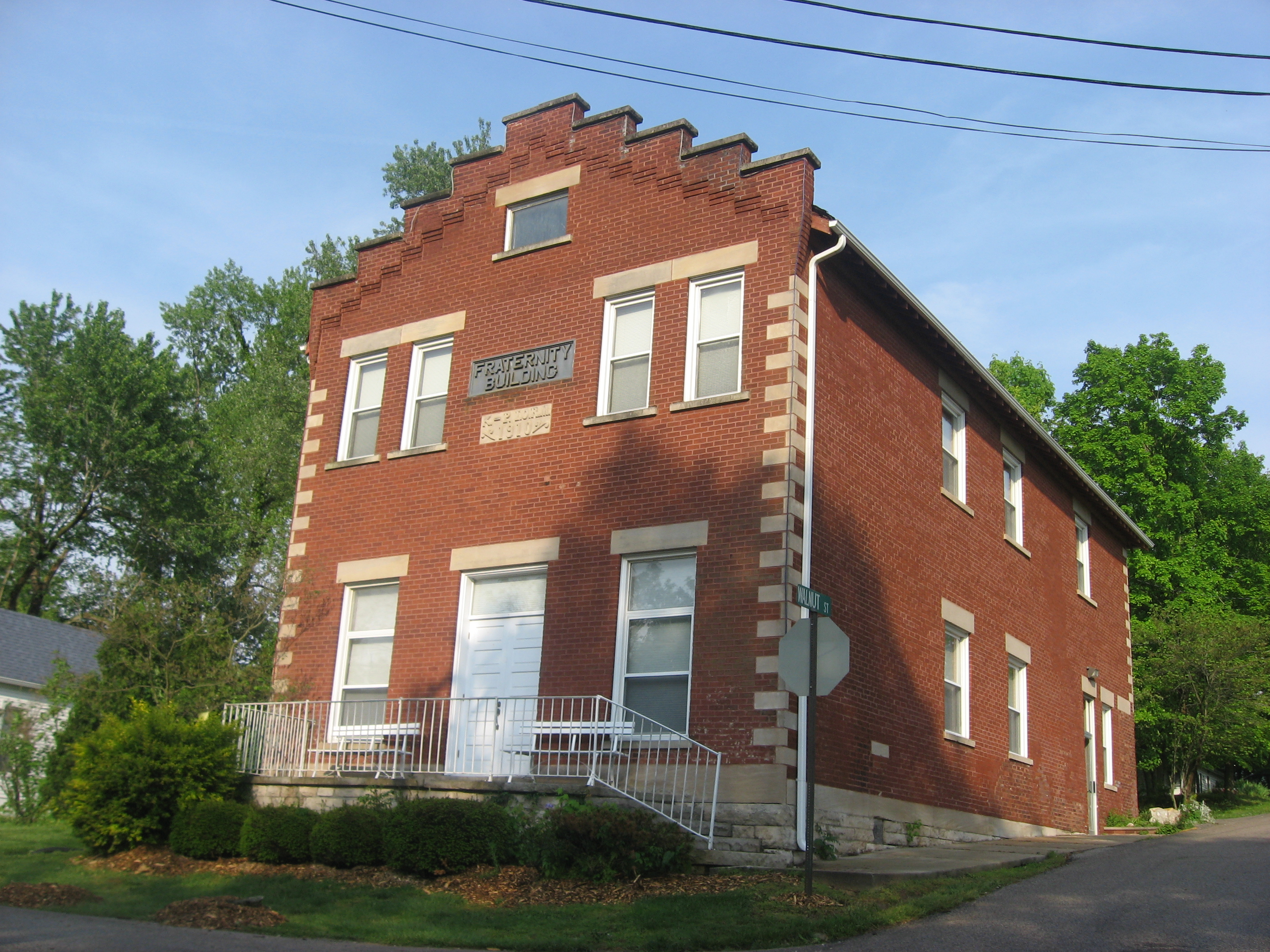

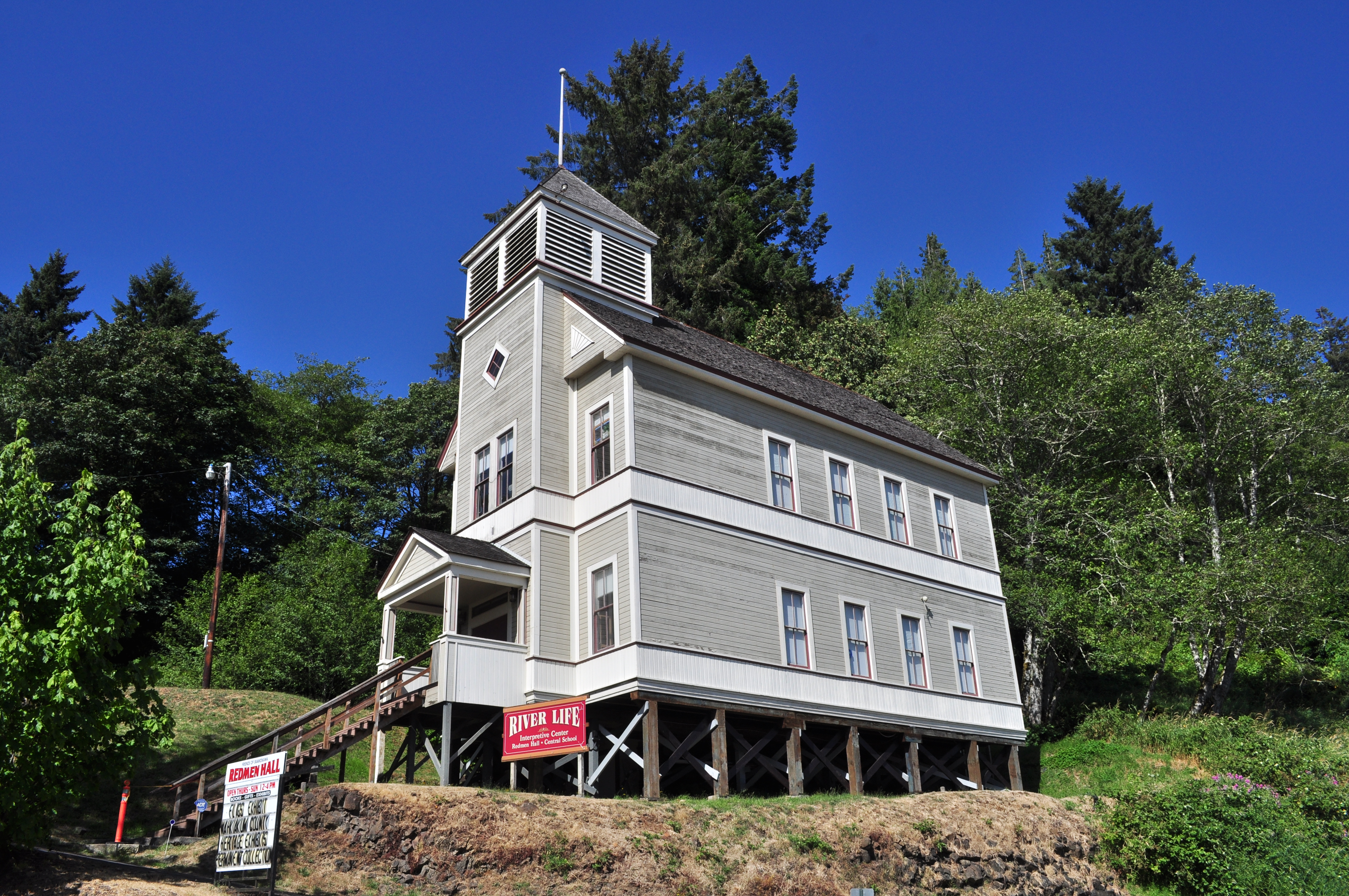

== See also ==
- 1896 Atlantic City rail crash
- Degree of Pocahontas
- Hail to the Sunrise
- List of general fraternities
- List of Improved Order of Red Men buildings and structures
- Massasoit (statue)
- National Haymakers' Association
- Red Men Museum and Library

== Notes and references ==
=== Bibliography ===
- Pluth, Edward J. (Winter 2022–23). "The White Red Men: The Improved Order of Red Men in Minnesota, 1875–1920". Minnesota History. 68 (4): 134–143. JSTOR 48768876 – via JSTOR.
- Schmidt, Alvin J. (1980). Fraternal Organizations. Westport, CT: Greenwood Press.
- Skocpol, Theda; Liazos, Ariane; Ganz, Marshall (2006). What a mighty power we can be: African American fraternal groups and the struggle for racial equality. Princeton: Princeton University Press.
- Stevens, Albert C., ed. (1907). The Cyclopædia of Fraternities (2nd ed.). New York City; Paterson, NJ: E. B. Treat and Co. LCCN 07036716. OCLC 2570157. OL 6990518M – via HathiTrust.
