= Hail to the Sunrise =

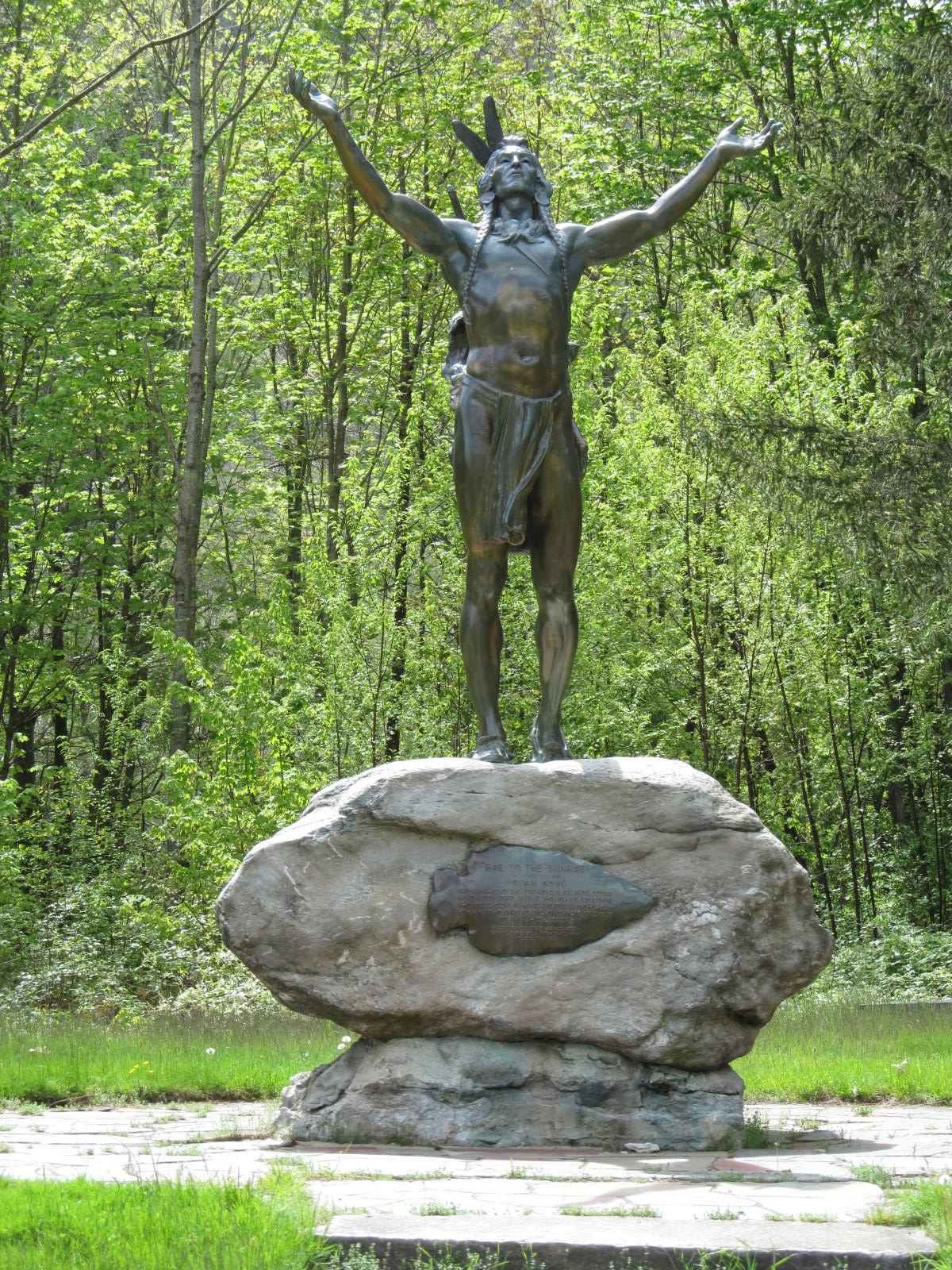
- The statue on the rock pedestal
- Interactive map of Hail to the Sunrise
- Location: Mohawk Park, Charlemont, Massachusetts
- Coordinates: 42°38′23.14″N 72°54′47.85″W
- Designer: Joseph Pollia
- Material: Bronze
- Completion date: 1932
- Dedicated to: The Mohawk nations of Massachusetts and New York

Hail to the Sunrise is the name of a monument in Charlemont, Massachusetts, United States. The monument features a prominent statue of a Mohawk warrior and the Max Eninger Memorial Pool. Completed in 1932 by the Improved Order of Red Men, it is a major feature of Mohawk Park, a roadside park located beside Massachusetts Route 2, the Mohawk Trail.

== Sculpture ==
The bronze statue depicts a Native American man in traditional wardrobe looking eastward with his arms extended. He faces the direction of the rising sun and is said to be greeting the Great Spirit. The casting stands upon a large boulder. A tablet in the shape of an arrowhead at the base of the statue reads: "Hail to the Sunrise - In Memory of the Mohawk Indian."

The pool is lined with 100 inscribed stones from various tribes and councils of the Red Men (the oldest fraternal organization to be granted a charter by Congress) and Degree of Pocahontas, the women's auxiliary, from throughout the United States. Stones of past and present members of the organization line the walkway around the pool.

== History ==
The Red Men are a fraternal organization who, despite their name, consisted of only white members at the time. The statue they commissioned was created by sculptor Joseph Pollia and revealed on October 1, 1932. More than 2,000 people attended the ceremony. The monument honors the peoples of the five Mohawk Nations that inhabited western Massachusetts and New York State. The Mohawks that traveled this trail were said to be friendly to white settlers according to the plaque. However, this area was historically inhabited by the Mohicans, rather than the Mohawk.

The grounds are open to the public and it remains a popular rest stop along the scenic highway. The park also serves as the site of an annual parade and ceremony hosted by the Red men.

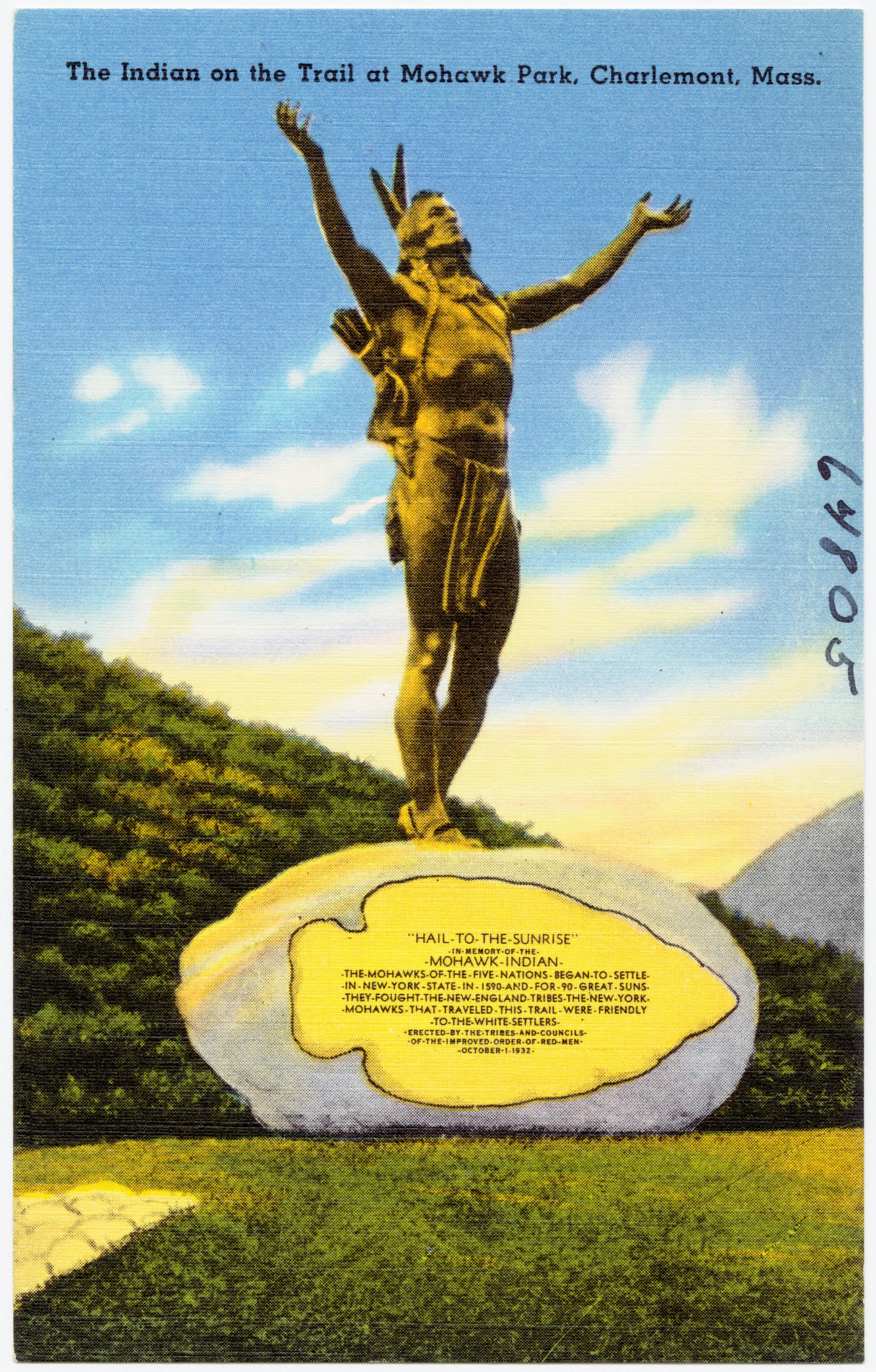
Antique postcard, c. 1930-1945

== See also ==
- Appeal to the Great Spirit, 1908 statue
- List of Improved Order of Red Men buildings and structures
