= Texas Brazos Trail =

- Founded: 2002
- Founder: Texas Historical Commission
- Purpose: Tourism, Economic Development and Historical Preservation
- Location: Waco, Texas
- Website: www.texasbrazostrail.com

The Texas Brazos Trail is a non-profit organization which promotes heritage tourism, economic development, and historic preservation. It is one of ten regions which make up the Texas Heritage Trails Program of the Texas Historical Commission.

== History ==
In 1968 Texas hosted the World's fair, known as HemisFair '68, in San Antonio, Texas. In connection with this boost in international attention, the Texas Department of Transportation designated ten 650-mile circular driving regions that encompassed the entire state of Texas. These trails saw little attention after their creation until in the late 1990s when the Texas Historical Commission adopted these trails as their Heritage Trail Program.

== Regional Heritage ==
A largely rural area of the U.S. state of Texas, the 18-county Brazos Trail Region historically was dependent on cotton and the railroad for survival. The region is named for the Brazos River which flows through the area and is still a vital water source. The area's primary industries are cotton, cattle and sugar cane. The railroads connected the region to the Gulf of Mexico for shipment throughout the United States and Europe.

In frontier times many European groups settled in the area including: Norwegians, Germans, Scots, Czech, and the Wends. Many examples of these cultures are still alive today and can be explored in local museums and are celebrated in various festivals.

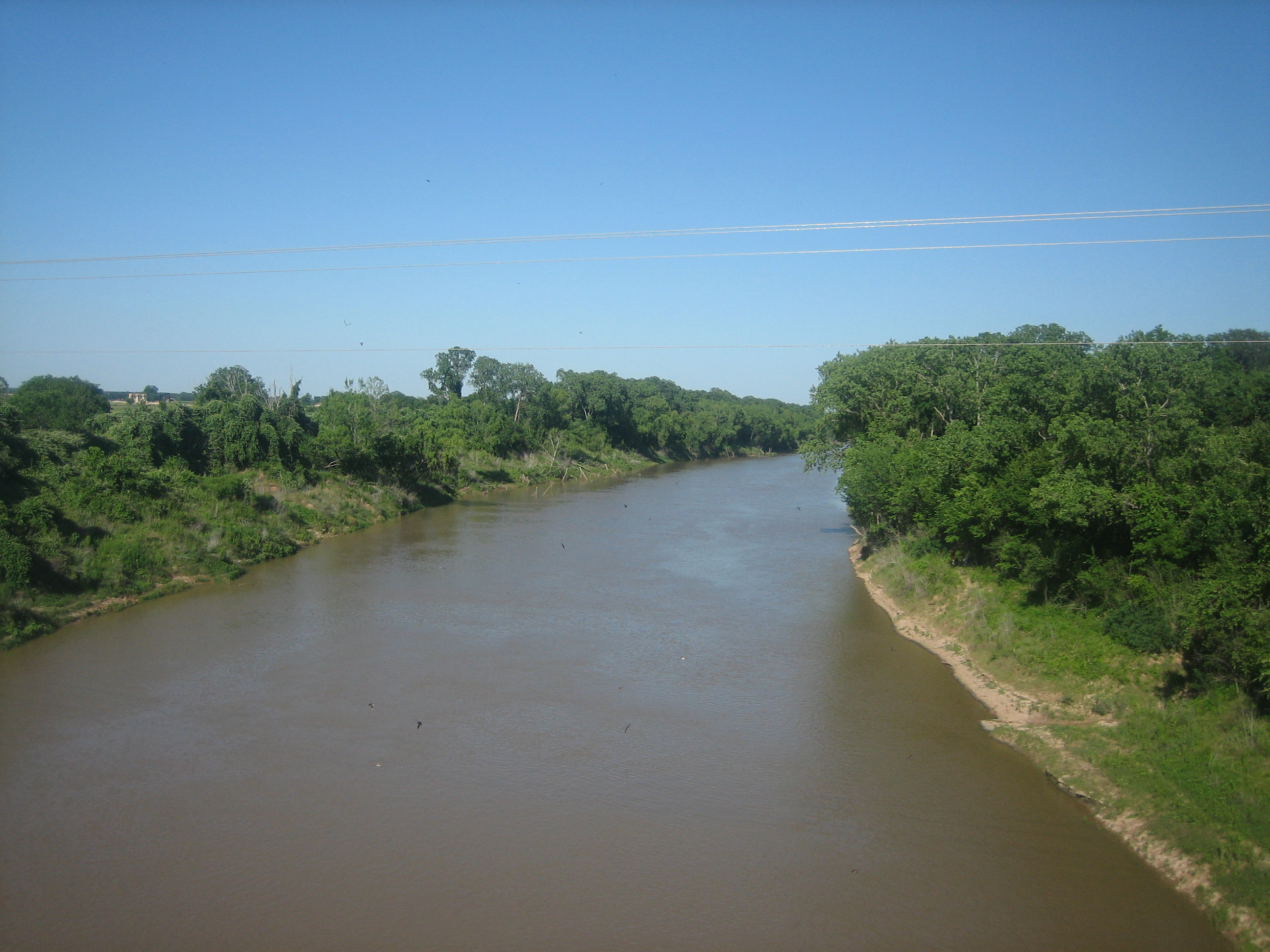
The Brazos River near Bryan, Texas

== Tourist Locations ==
- The Dr Pepper Museum
- Texas Rangers Hall of Fame
- The George Bush Presidential Library and Museum
- Old Fort Parker
- Inner Space Caverns
- The Children's Museum of the Brazos Valley

== See also ==
- Texas Heritage Trails Program
