= Cedar Hill Cemetery (Suffolk, Virginia) =

Historic cemetery in Virginia, United States

- U.S. National Register of Historic Places
- U.S. Historic district
- Virginia Landmarks Register
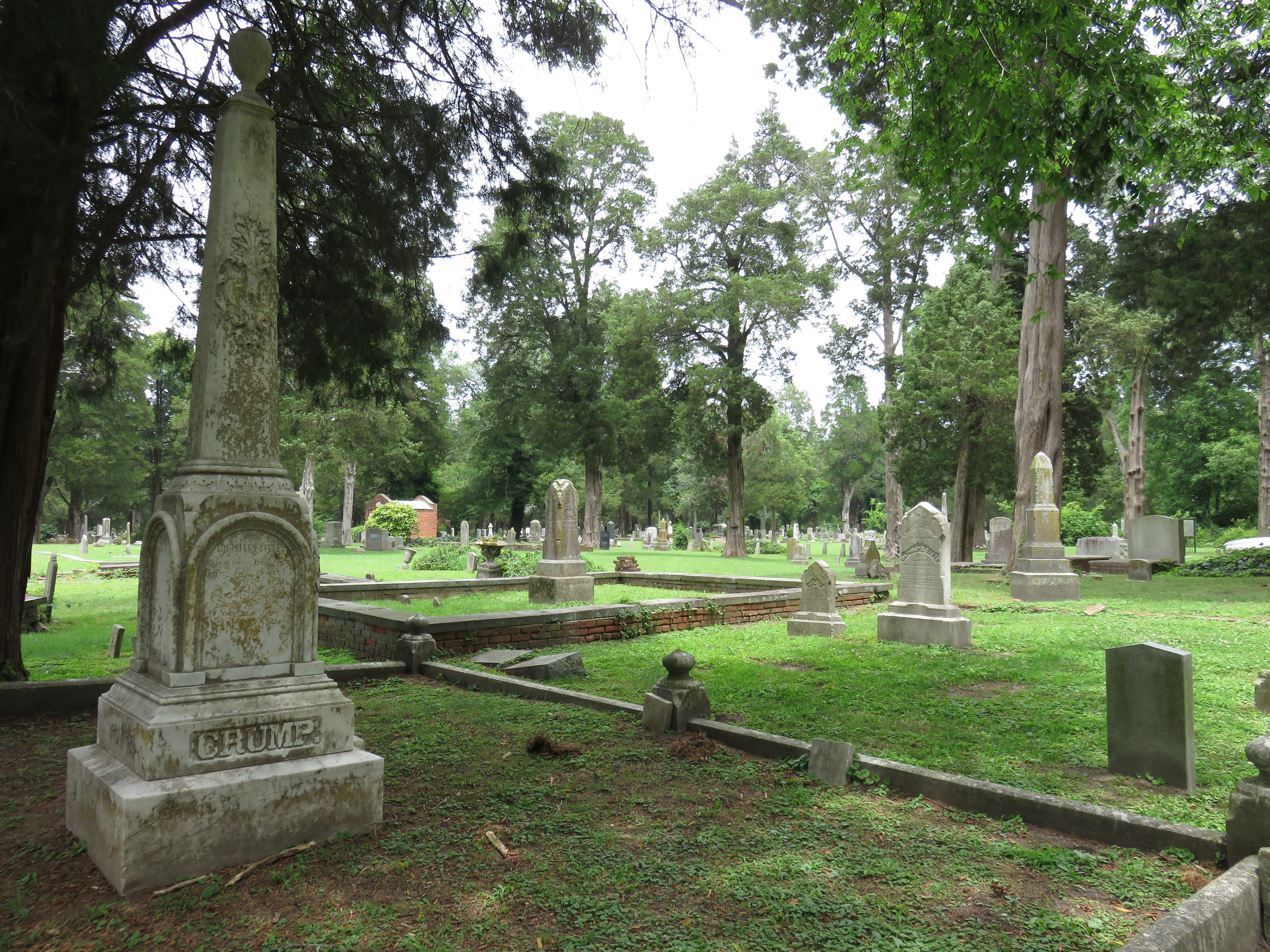
- Cedar Hill Cemetery in 2016

- Location within Virginia Location within the United States
- Location: 105 Mahan St. (S of E. Constance Rd.), Suffolk, Virginia
- Coordinates: 36°44′15″N 76°34′47″W
- Area: 25 acres (10 ha)
- Built: 1802
- Architect: John P. Hall Co.; Joseph Pollia.
- Architectural style: Early Republic, Late 19th And 20th Century Revivals
- NRHP reference No.: 05001584
- VLR No.: 133-5018

Significant dates
- Added to NRHP: February 1, 2006
- Designated VLR: December 7, 2005

Cedar Hill Cemetery, also known as Green Hill Cemetery, is a historic cemetery and national historic district located at Suffolk, Virginia. The district encompasses four contributing structures, one contributing site, and three contributing objects in a city-owned, 25-acre, public cemetery dating to 1802. Grave markers within the cemetery date from the early 19th century to the present day. This cemetery is a representative example of public cemetery planning and funerary artwork found in southeast Virginia and Suffolk. The contributing structures include the Darden (1938), Hosier, Hill (1933) and Brewer-Godwin mausoleums and the contributing objects include the Confederate Monument (1889) and World War I Monument.

It was added to the National Register of Historic Places in 2006.

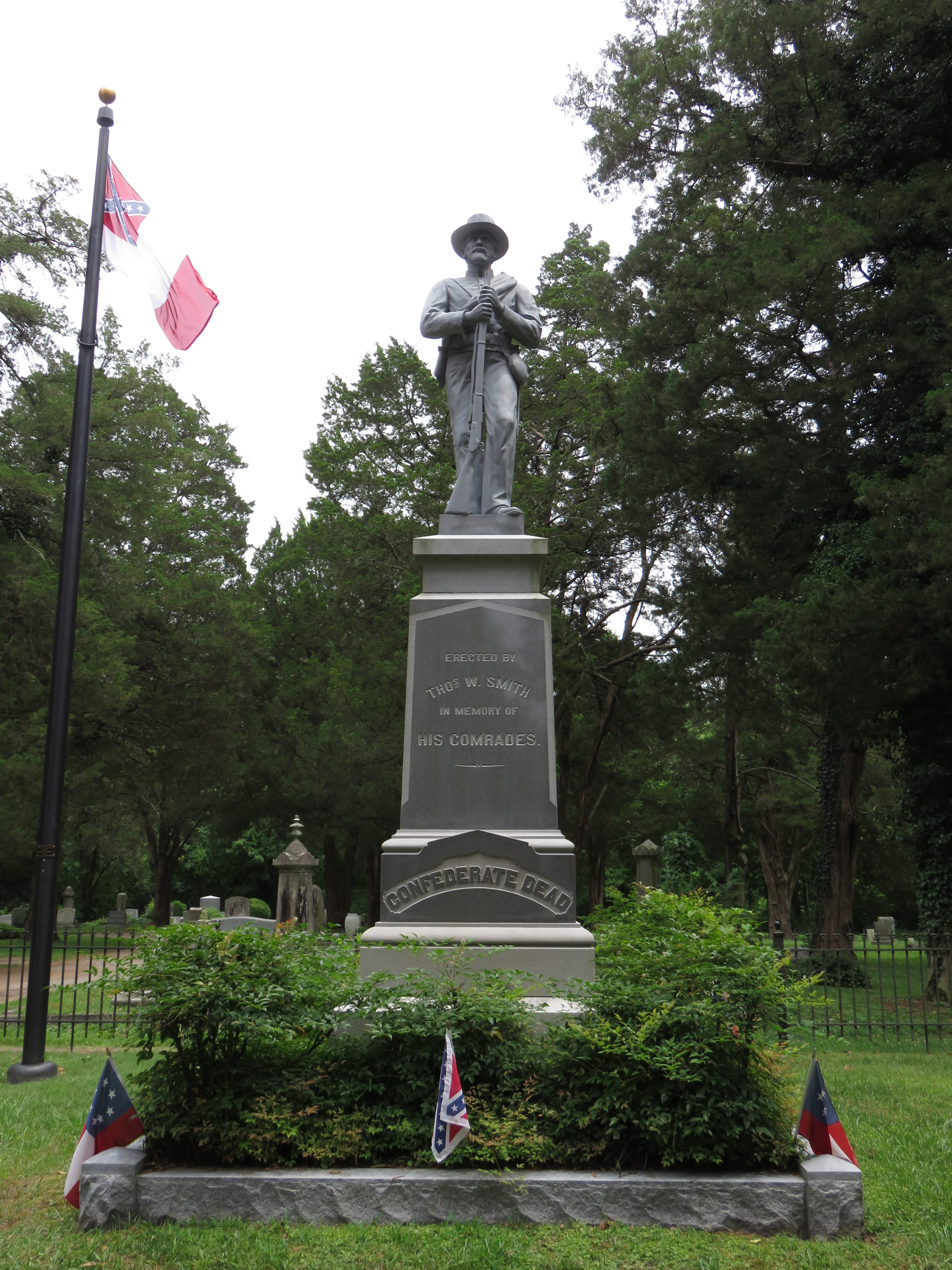
Confederate memorial at Cedar Hill Cemetery

== Notable burials ==
- Thomas H. Barnes (1831–1913), member of the Virginia House of Delegates and Virginia Senate
- Lawrence O'Bryan Branch (1820–1862 †), Civil War Confederate Brigadier General
- William Henry Haywood Jr. (1801–1852), US Senator
- Richard Hines (1792–1851), US Congressman
- Charles Manly (1795–1871), North Carolina Governor
- Sion Hart Rogers (1825–1874), US Congressman
- Absalom Tatom (1742–1802), US Congressman
- Laurence S. Baker (1830-1907), Civil War Confederate Brigadier General
