= List of Improved Order of Red Men buildings and structures =

List of buildings by organization

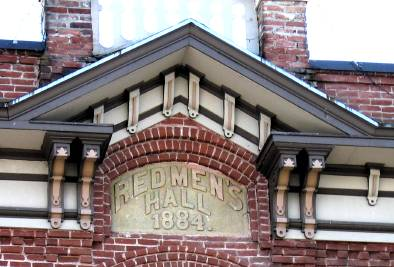
Jacksonville, Oregon building detail

The Improved Order of Red Men are a fraternal organization in the United States whose membership peaked above 500,000 in 1920 and dwindled to around 15,000 by 2011. Many chapters built clubhouses, which the group calls "wigwams"; many of these have been sold and repurposed.

KEY

NRHP-listed
Contributing property in a NRHP-listed historic district
Formerly NRHP-listed
Local heritage register

Individually notable buildings and structures

(ordered by state, then populated place)

	Building	Image	Dates	Location	City, State	Description
1	Red Men Hall (Los Angeles)		1915 built 2003 LAHCM-listed	543 Shepard Street; 33°42′24″N 118°17′20″W	Los Angeles, California	Los Angeles Historic-Cultural Monument listing
2	Red Men Hall (Essex, Connecticut)		1832 built 1985 NRHP-listed	22 Prospect Street; 41°21′14″N 72°23′34″W	Essex, Connecticut	Later became Hill's Academy
3	Red Men's Fraternal Home		1841 built 1983 NRHP-listed	48 West Park Place; 39°40′30″N 75°45′21″W	Newark, Delaware	Previously the Deer Park Farm; Demolished.
4	Red Men Hall (Franklin, Indiana)		1915 built 1989 NRHP-CP-listed	156 East Jefferson Street; 39°28′51″N 86°03′16″W	Franklin, Indiana	Franklin Commercial Historic District contributing property
5	Red Men Hall (Harmony, Indiana)		1880 built 1986 NRHP-listed	131-137 E. Market St. 39°32′04″N 87°04′24″W	Harmony, Indiana	Later the Coal Company Store; Delisted in 1992
6	Red Men Hall (Lagro, Indiana)		1911 built 2020 NRHP-listed	820 Washington Street; 40°50′11″N 85°43′41″W	Lagro, Indiana	Now part of the Lagro Canal Foundation
7	Red Men Hall (North Vernon, Indiana)		1880 built 2006 NRHP-CP-listed	227 East Walnut Street; 39°00′19″N 85°37′29″W	North Vernon, Indiana	North Vernon Downtown Historic District contributing property
8	Red Men Hall (Brunswick, Maryland)		1904 built	40 West Potomac Street; 39°18′47″N 77°37′41″W	Brunswick, Maryland	Brunswick Historic District contributing property; now the Brunswick Heritage Museum
9	Hail to the Sunrise		1932 built	82 Tower Road; 42°38′23″N 72°54′48″W	Charlemont, Massachusetts	Located along the Mohawk Trail
10	Massasoit		1921 built	Carver Road; 41°57′28″N 70°39′45″W	Plymouth, Massachusetts	Site of annual National Day of Mourning across from Plymouth Rock
11	Red Men Hall (Reading, Pennsylvania)		1900 Built; 2000 NRHP-listed	404 South West Temple Street; 40°20′21″N 75°55′21″W	Reading, Pennsylvania	Now Century Hall senior housing
12	Red Men Museum and Library		1991 Built	4521 Speight Avenue; 31°30′45″N 97°09′26″W	Waco, Texas	National headquarters modeled after Monticello
13	Red Men Hall (Barre, Vermont)		1906 built 1975 NRHP-listed	10 North Brook Street; 44°12′13″N 72°30′30″W	Barre (city), Vermont	Previously the Italian Baptist Church
14	Red Men Hall (Danville, Virginia)		1937 built 2009 NRHP-listed	31 Baltimore Avenue; 36°34′05″N 79°25′27″W	Danville, Virginia	Part of the individually listed Schoolfield School Complex
15	Red Men Hall (Lovettsville, Virginia)		1923 built 2012 NRHP-CP-listed	15 East Broad Way; 39°16′24″N 77°38′14″W	Lovettsville, Virginia	Lovettsville Historic District contributing property
16	Red Men Hall (Index, Washington)		1903 built 2009 NRHP-listed	530 Index Avenue; 47°49′18″N 121°33′14″W	Index, Washington	Building collapsed in 2009

== Gallery ==
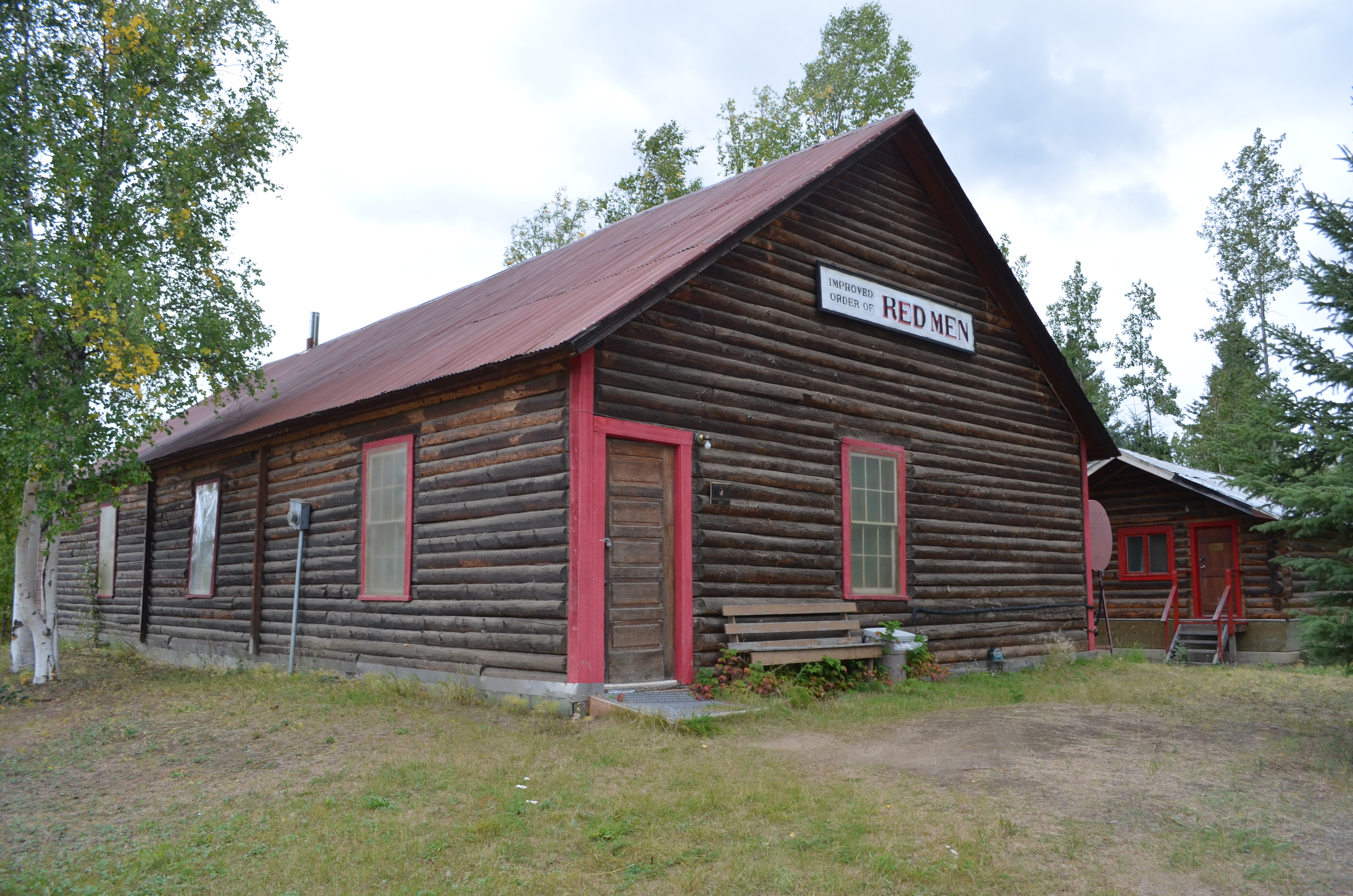
Eagle, Alaska

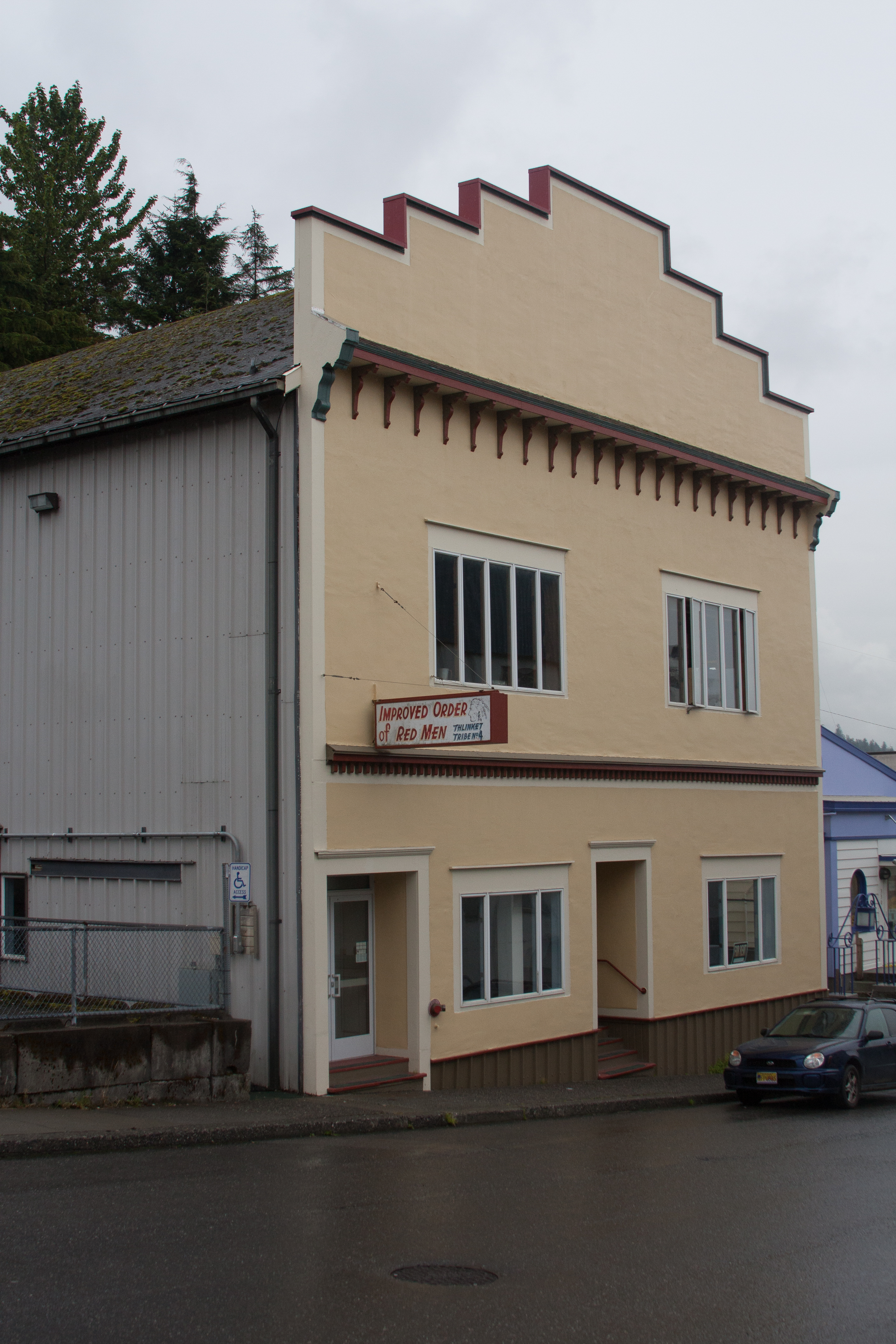
Ketchikan, Alaska

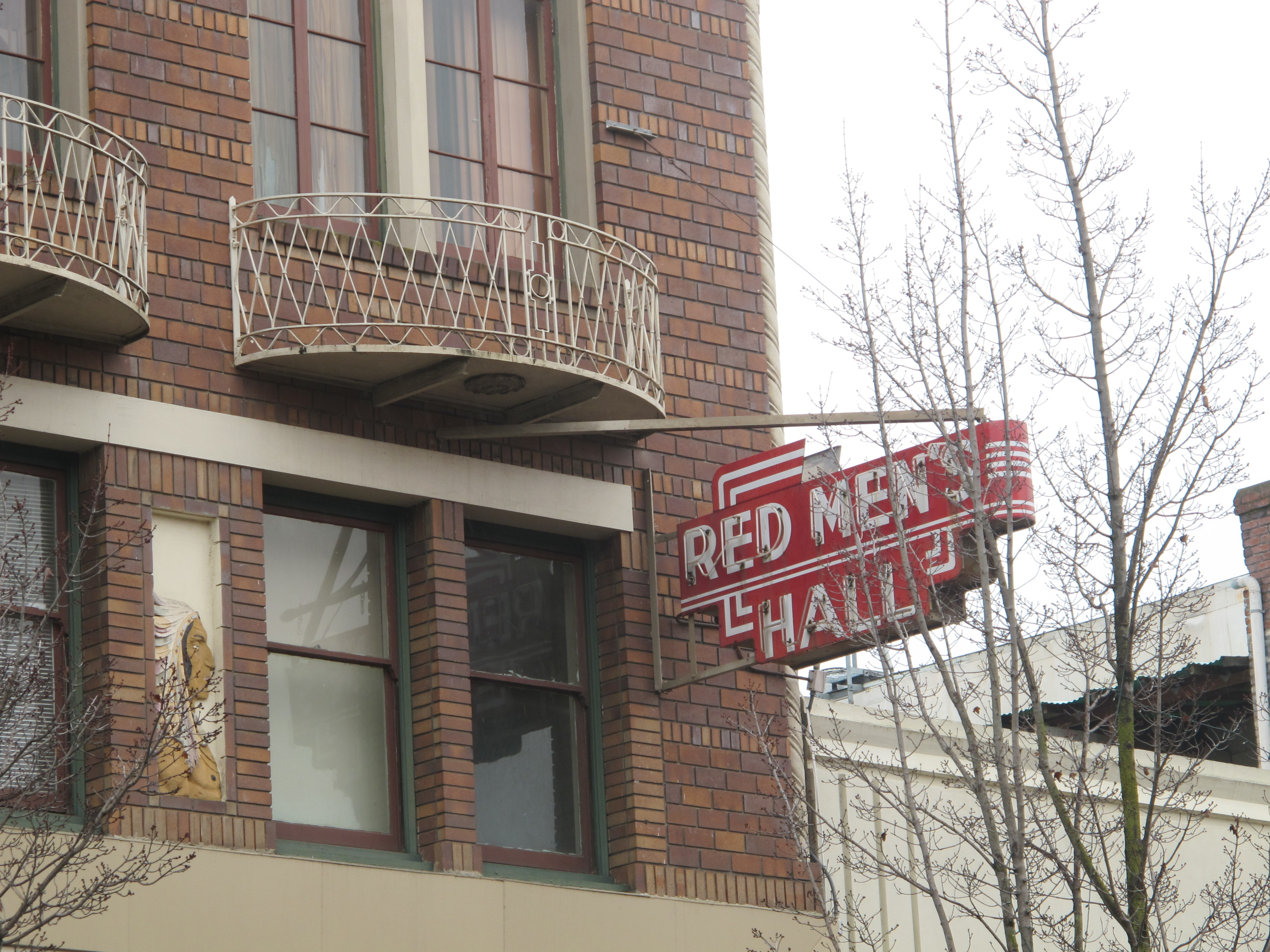
Vallejo, California

Empire, Colorado

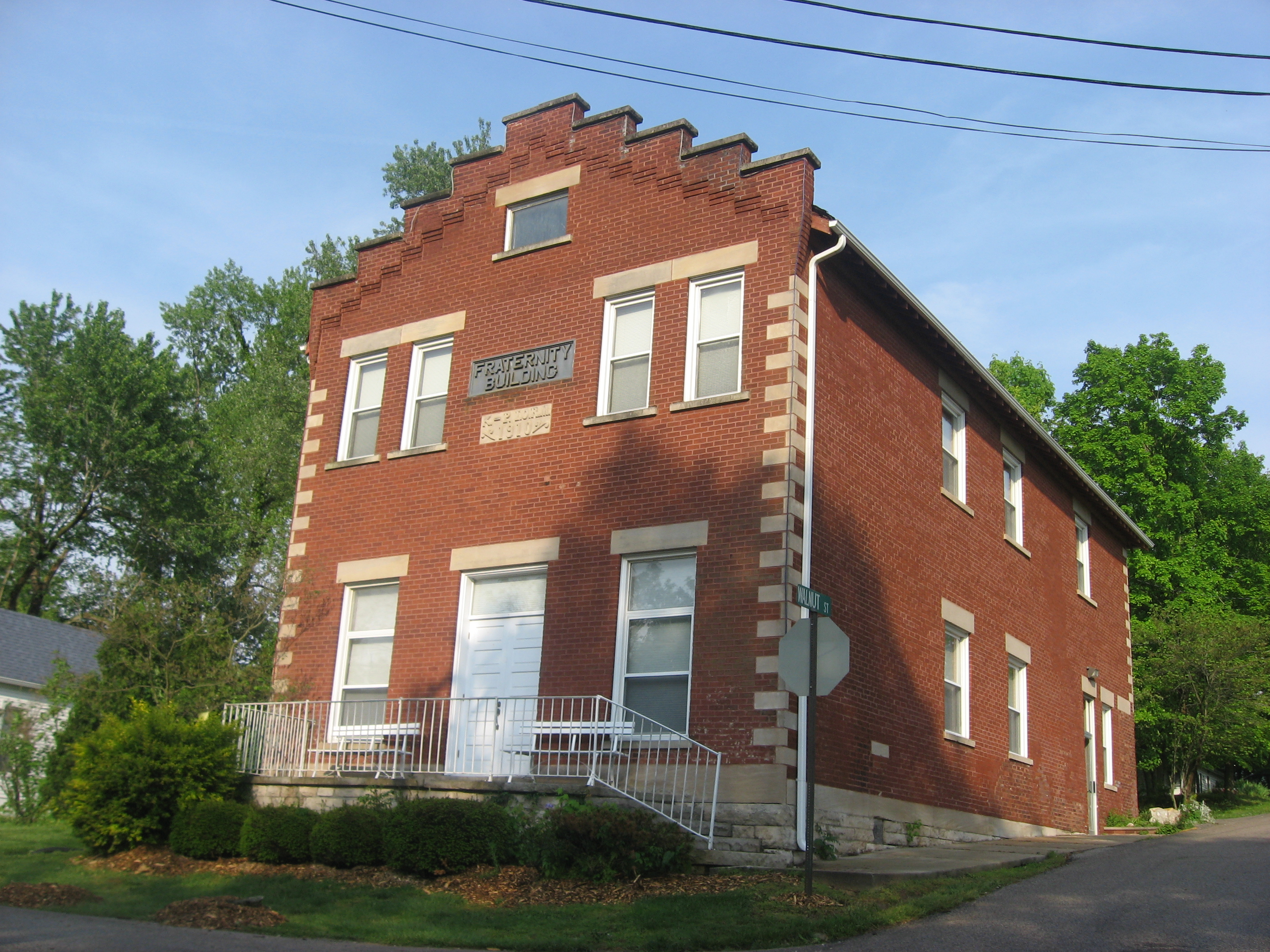
Smithville, Monroe County, Indiana

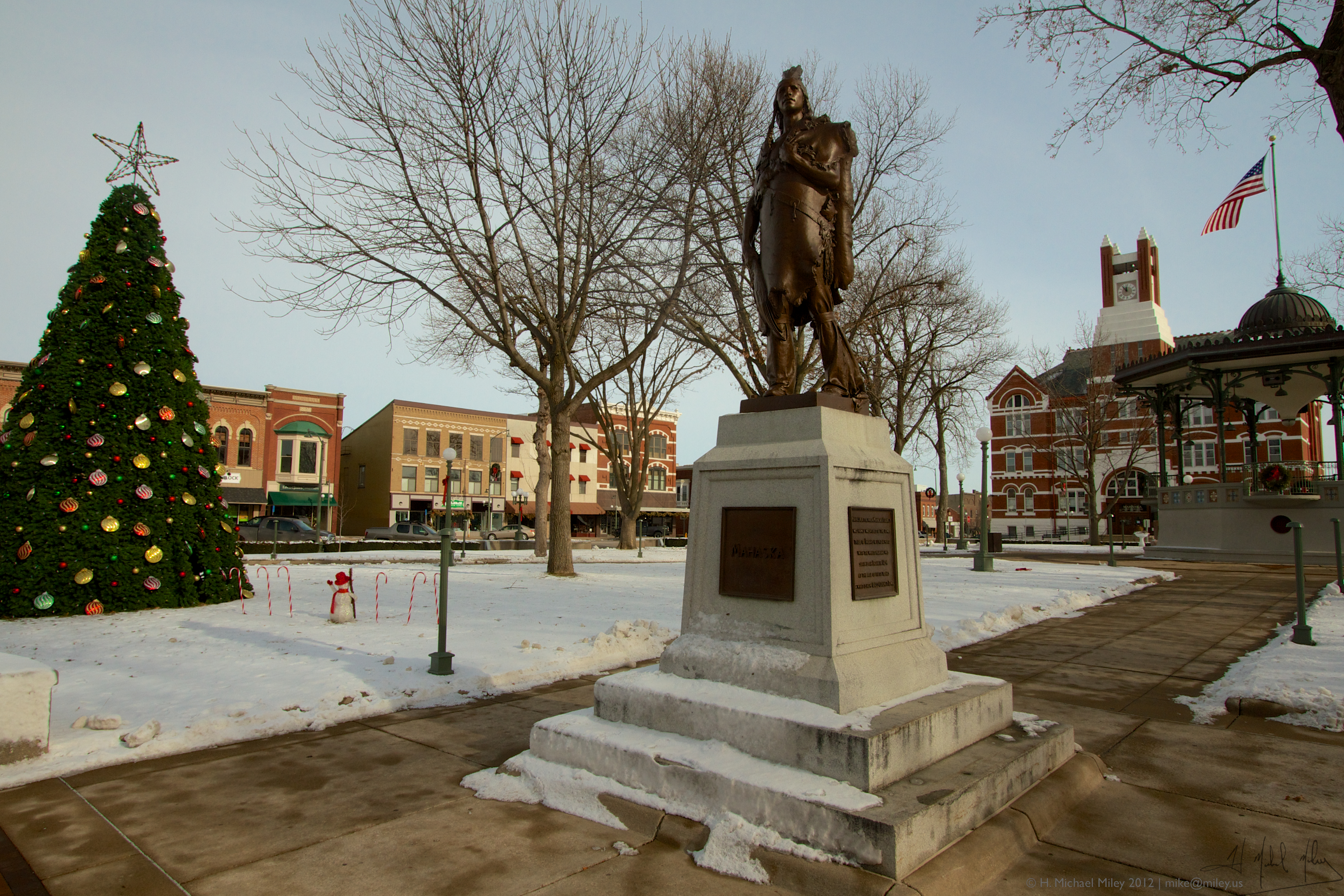
Oskaloosa, Iowa

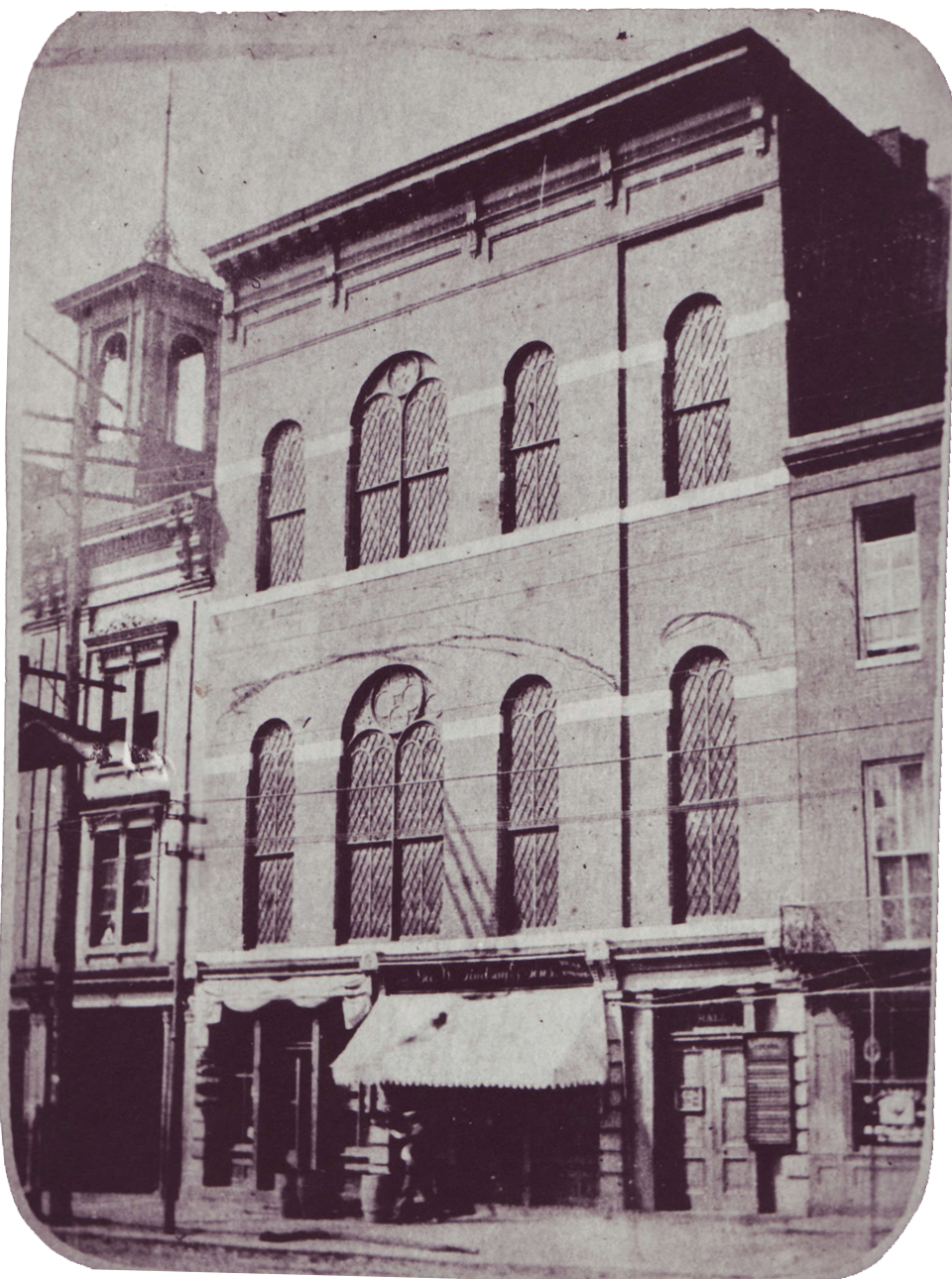
Downtown, Baltimore, Maryland

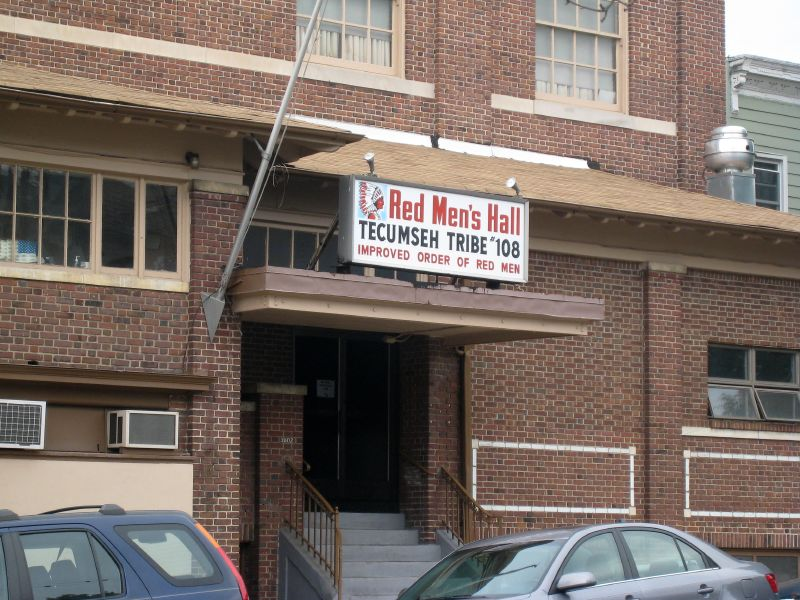
Hampden, Baltimore, Maryland

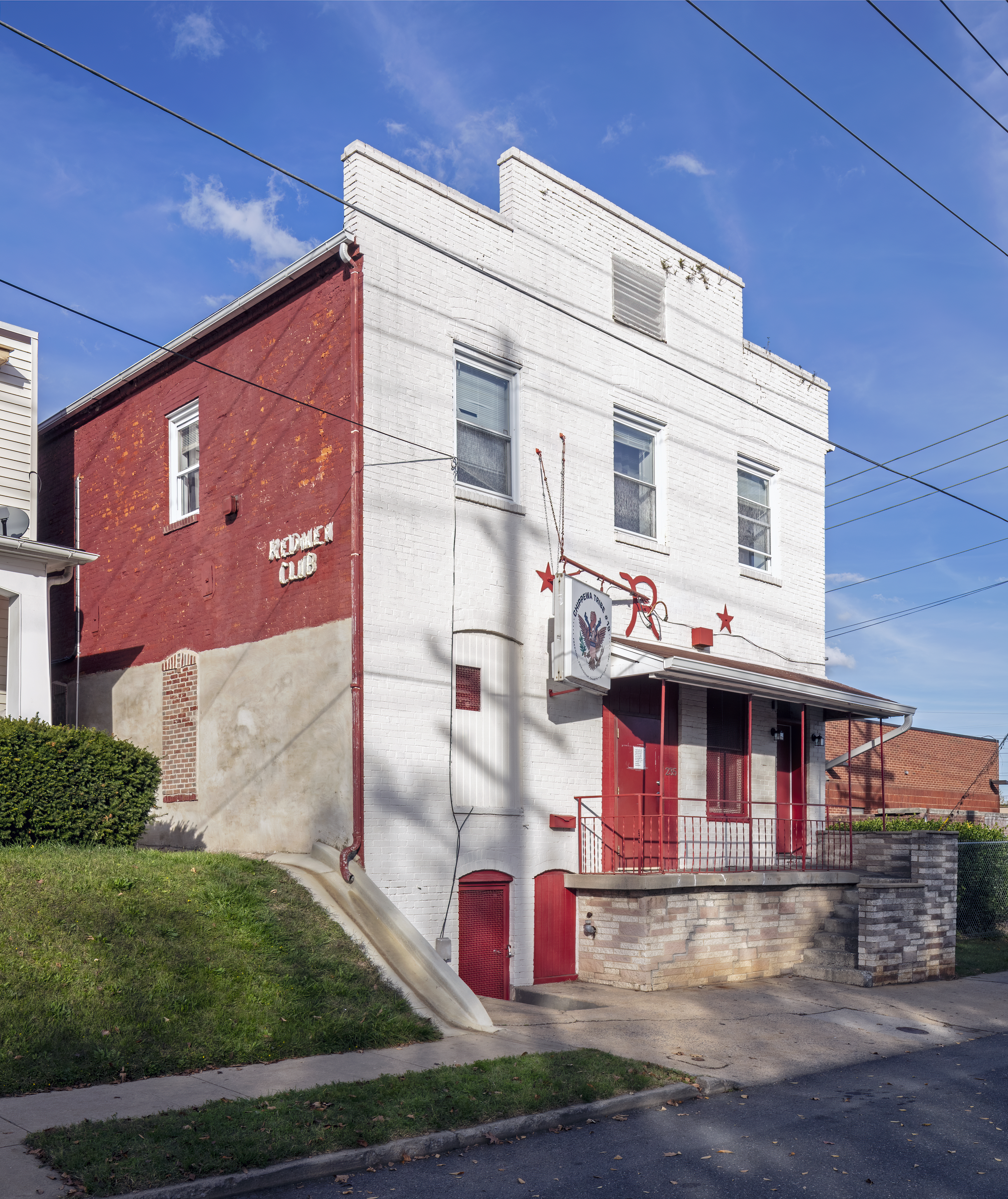
Frederick, Maryland

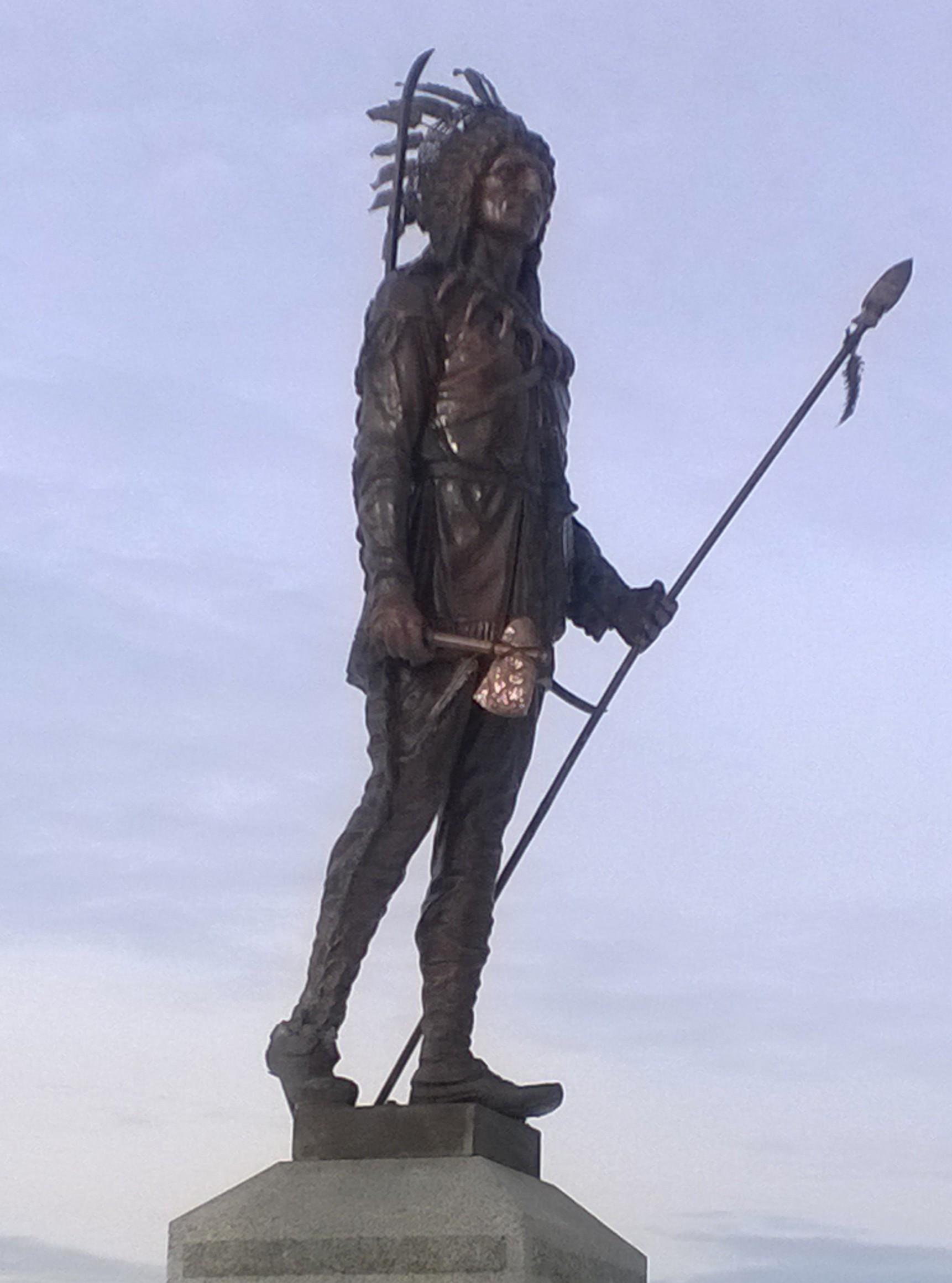
Lowell, Massachusetts

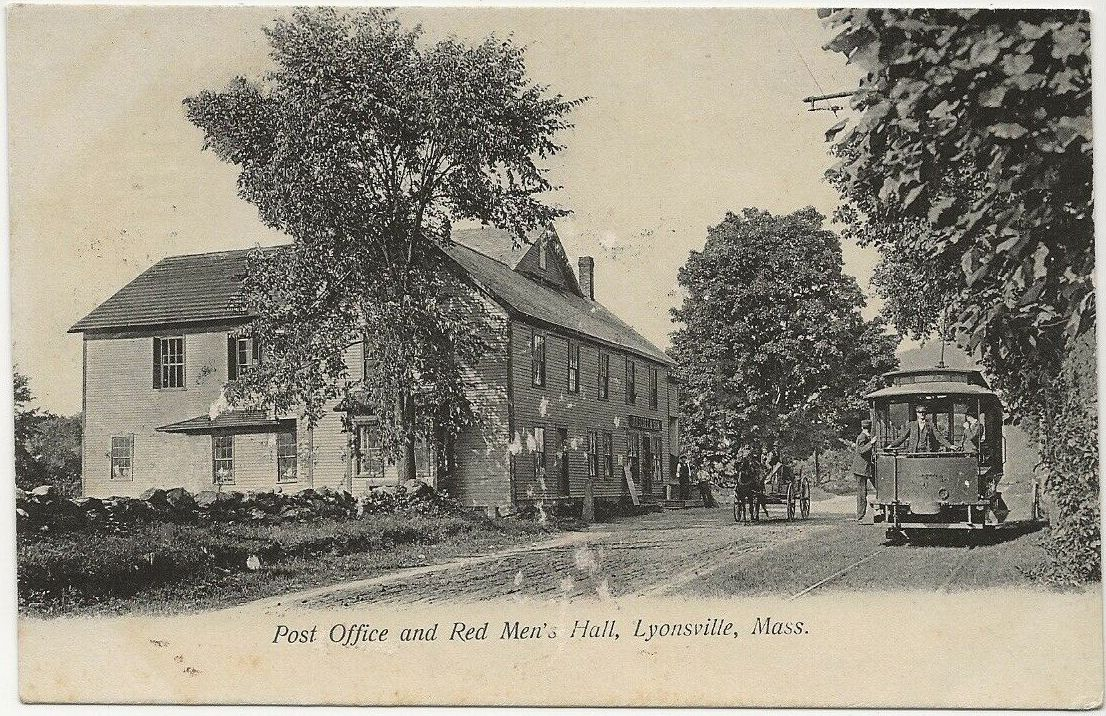
Lyonsville, Massachusetts

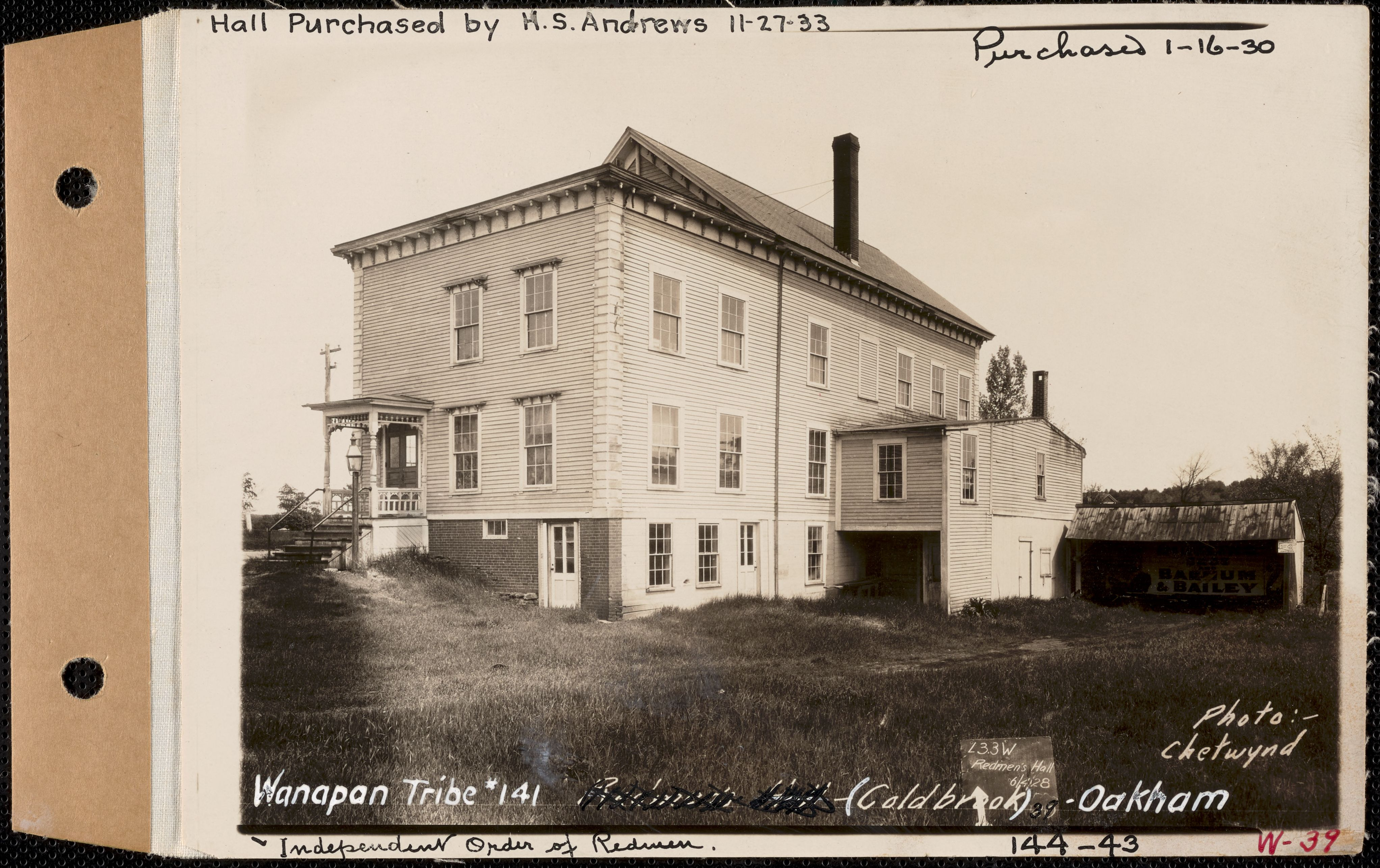
Oakham, Massachusetts

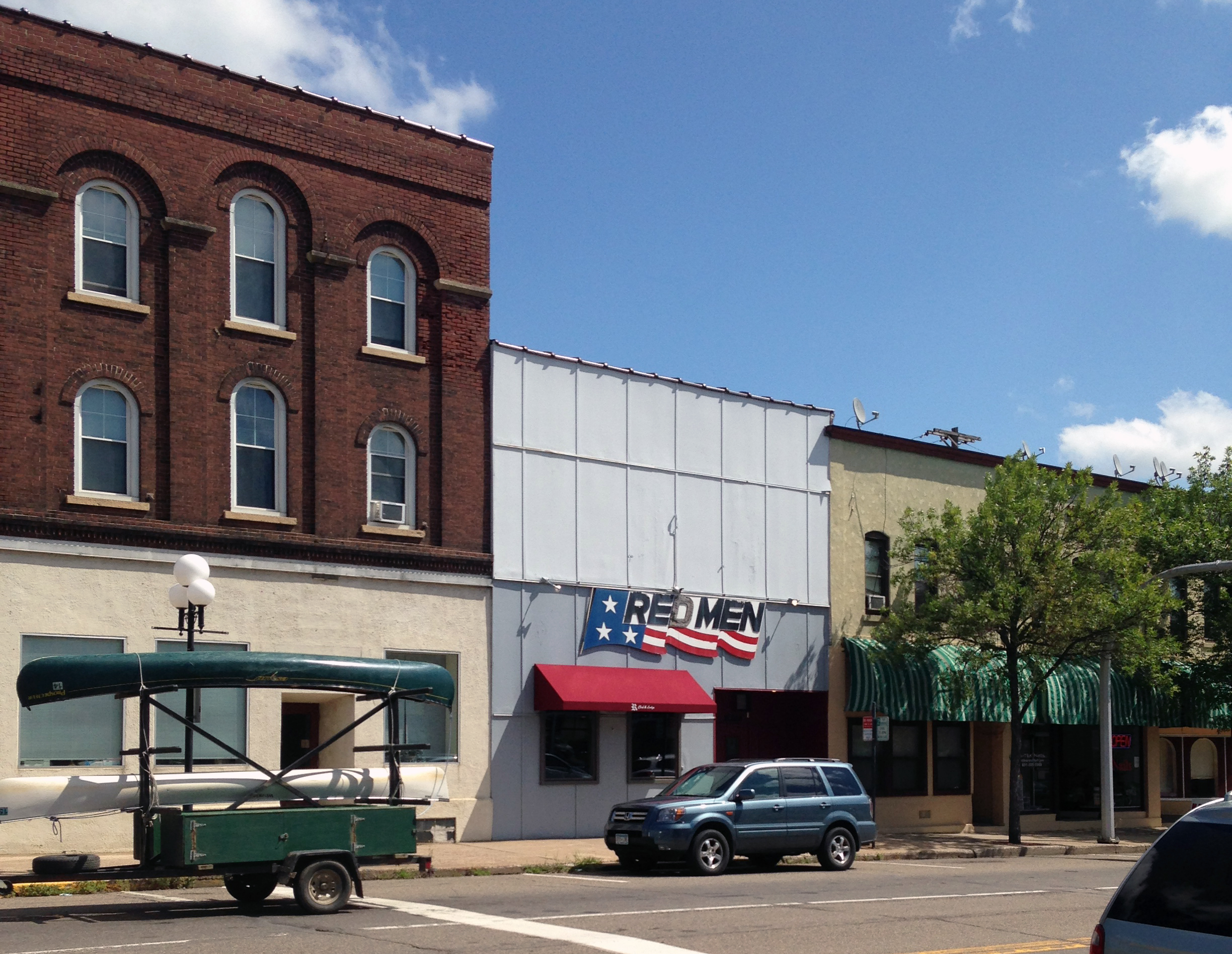
Winona, Minnesota

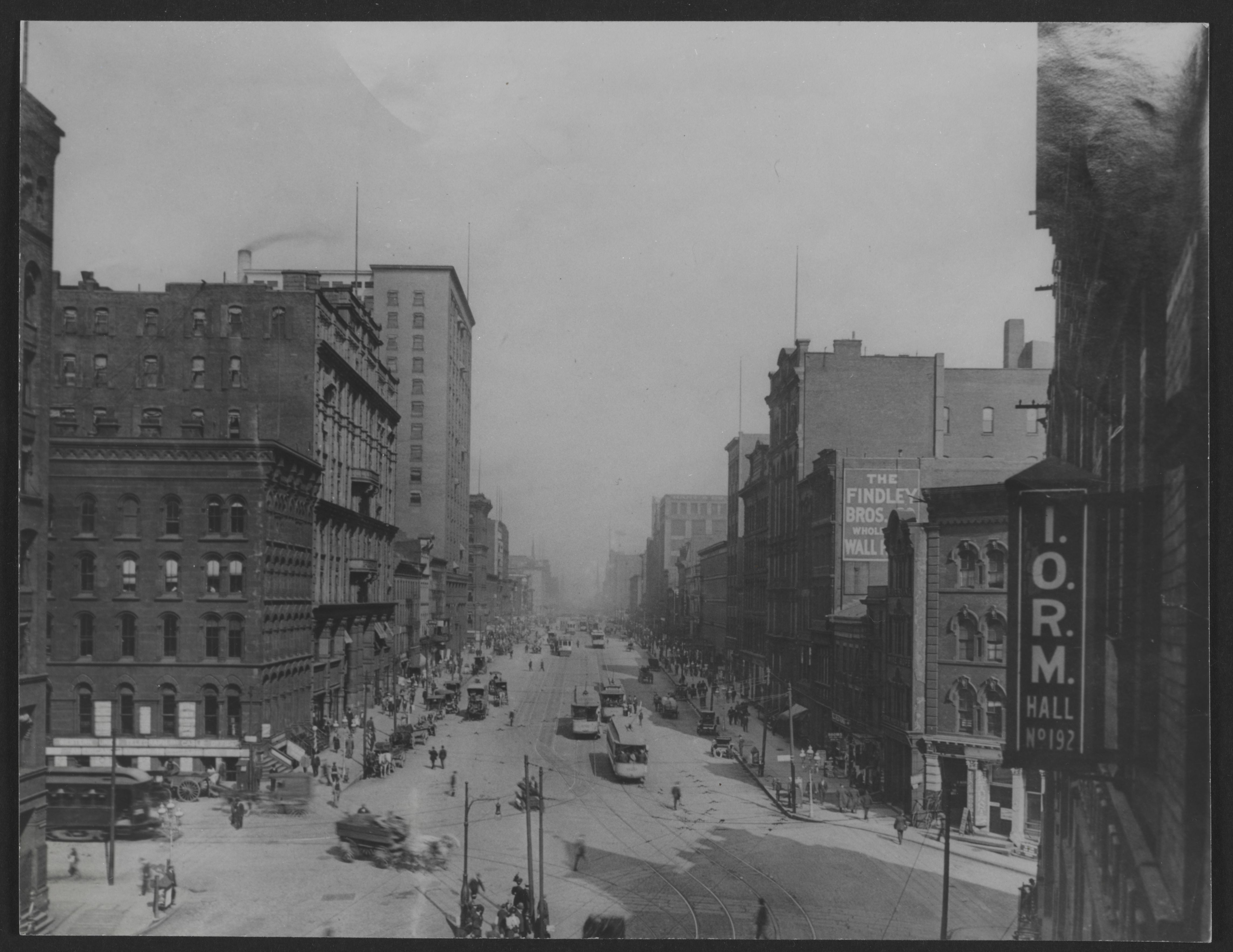
Cleveland, Ohio

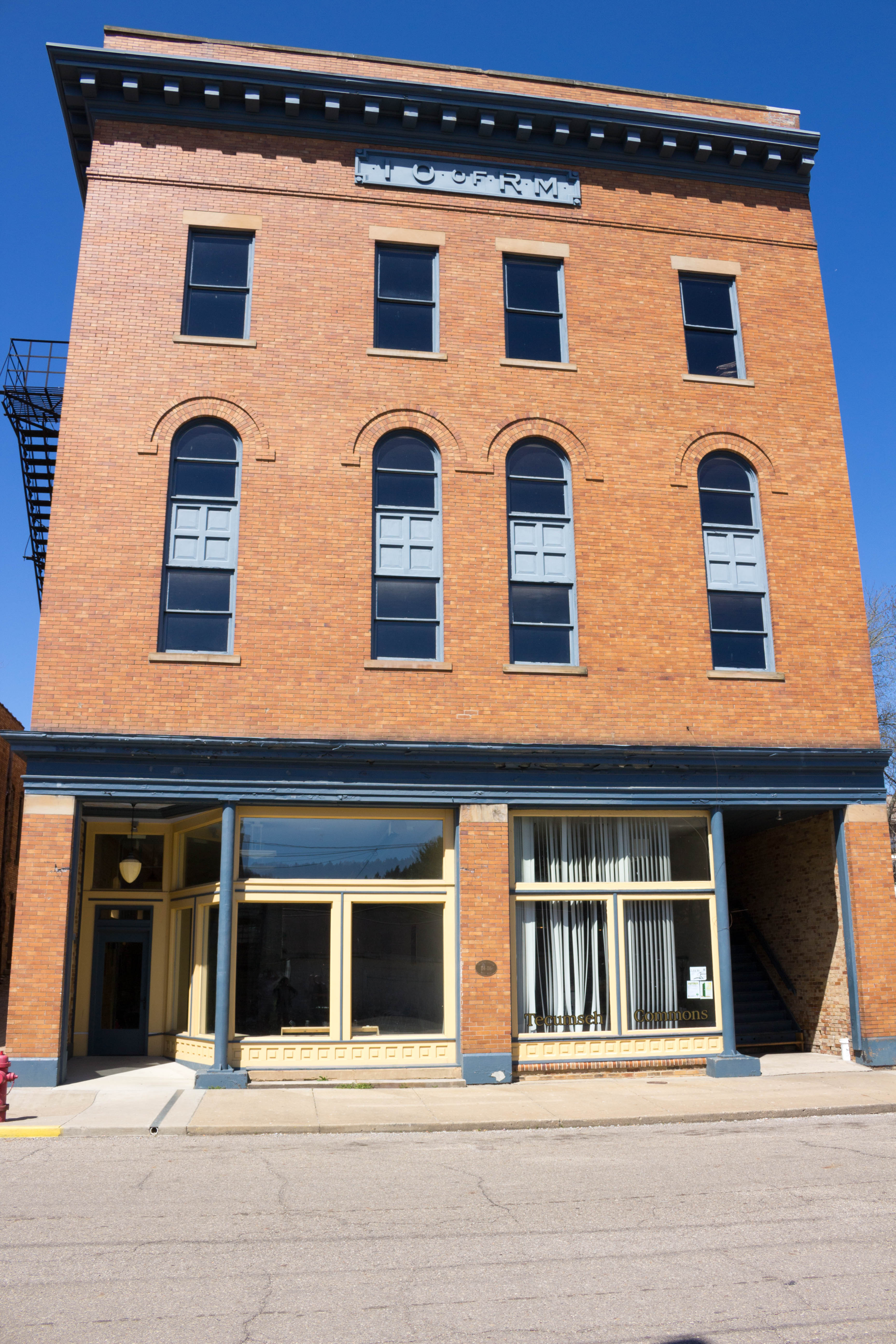
Shawnee, Perry County, Ohio

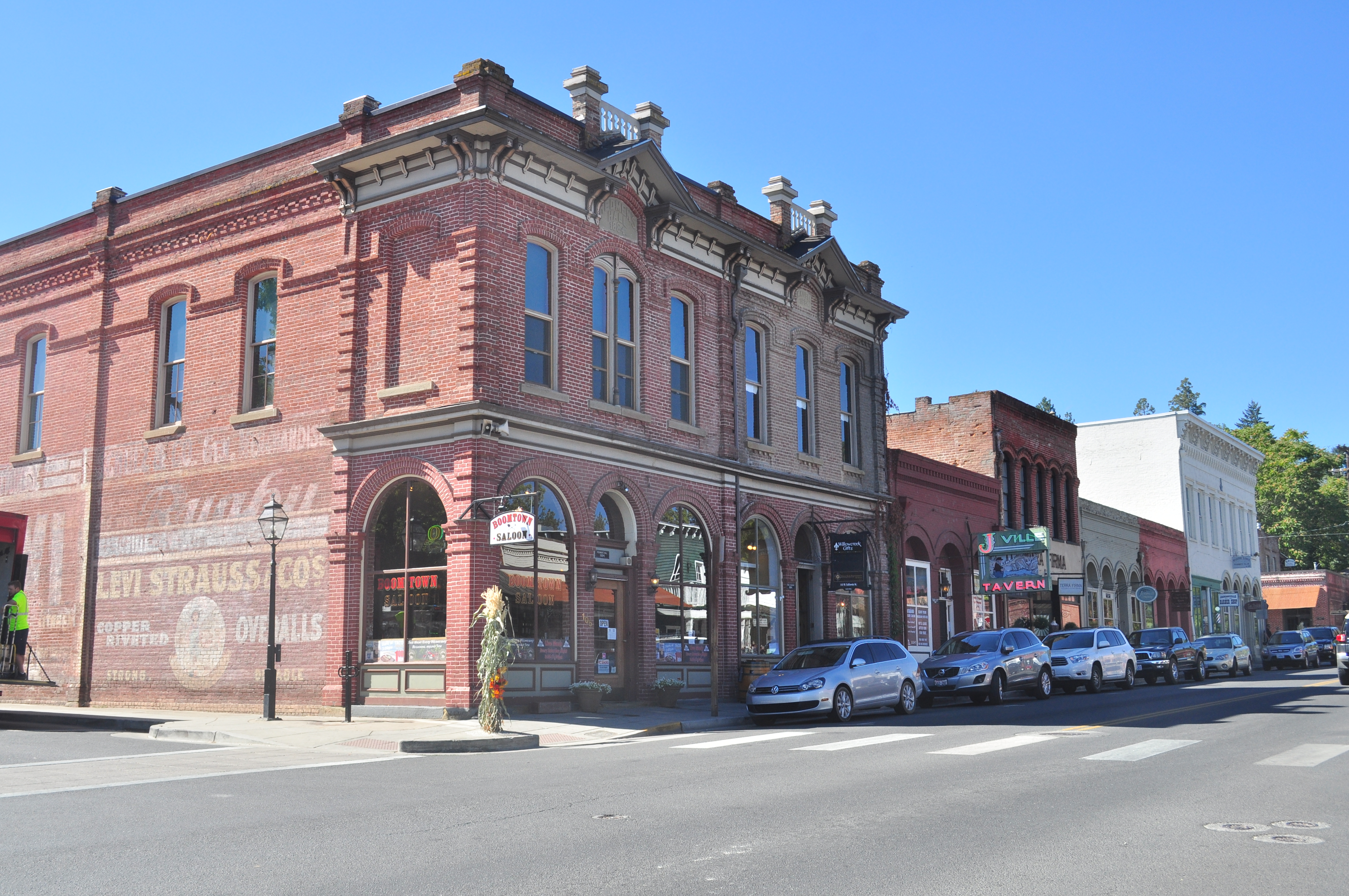
Jacksonville, Oregon

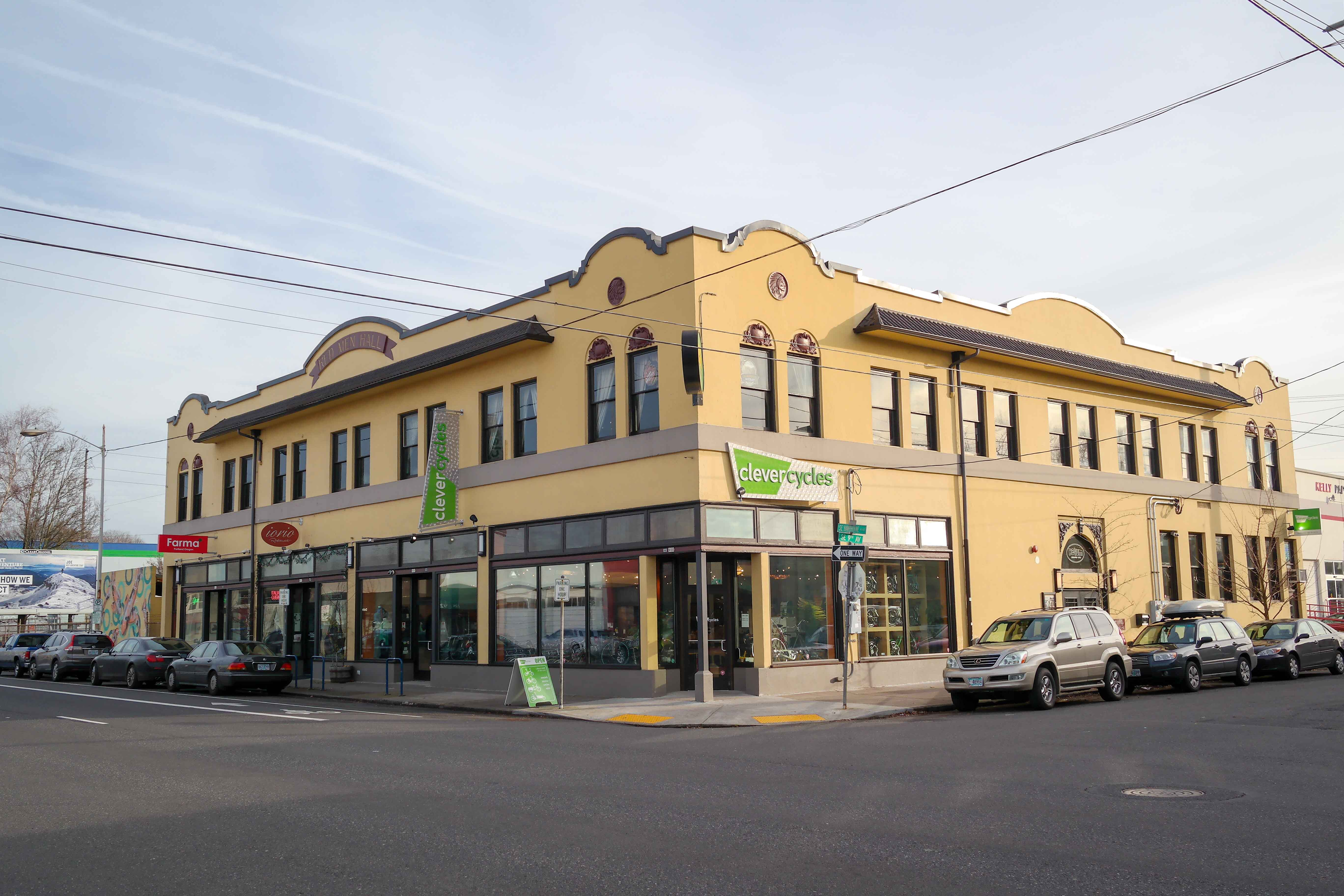
Portland, Oregon

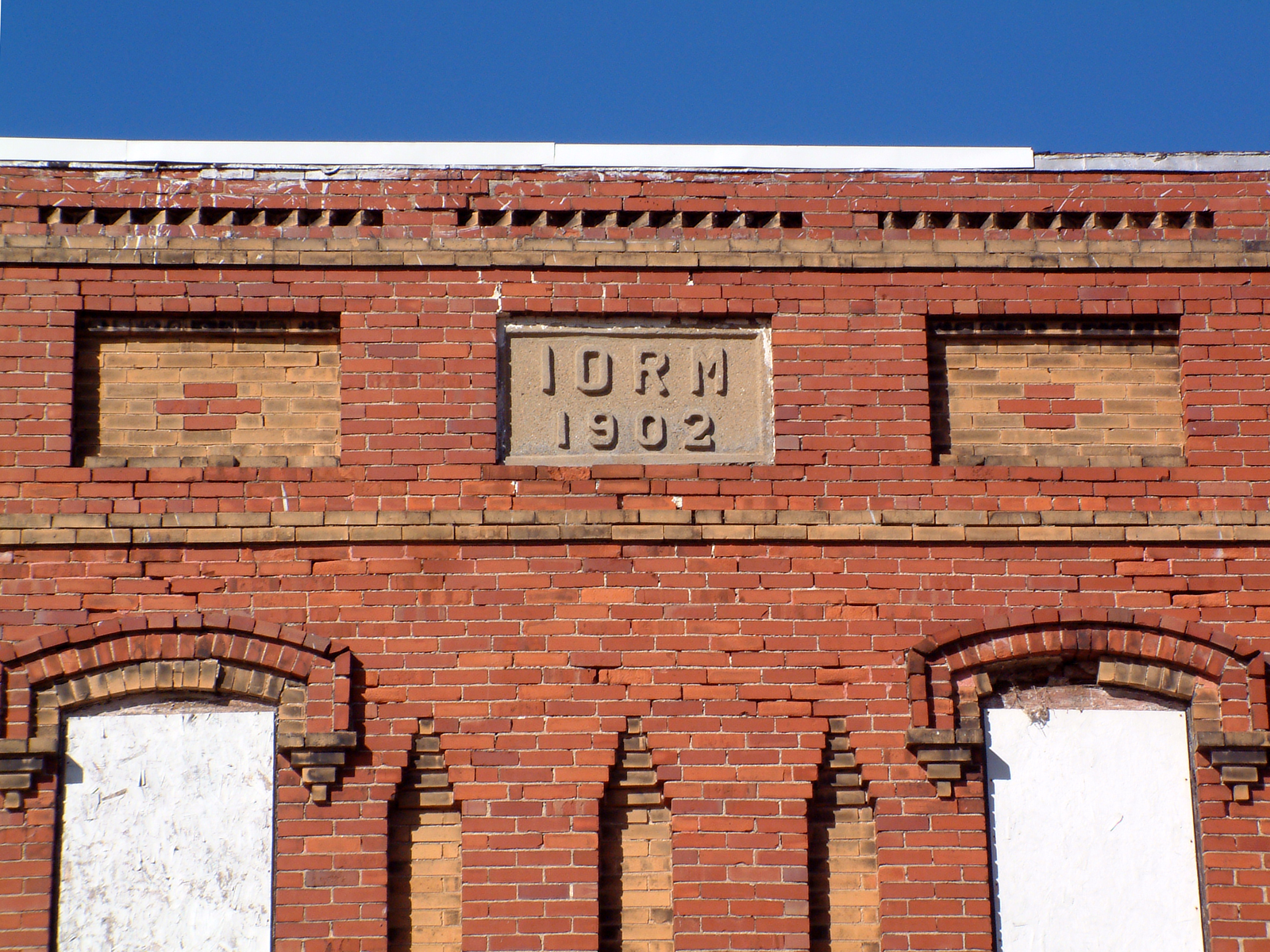
West Lebanon, Pennsylvania

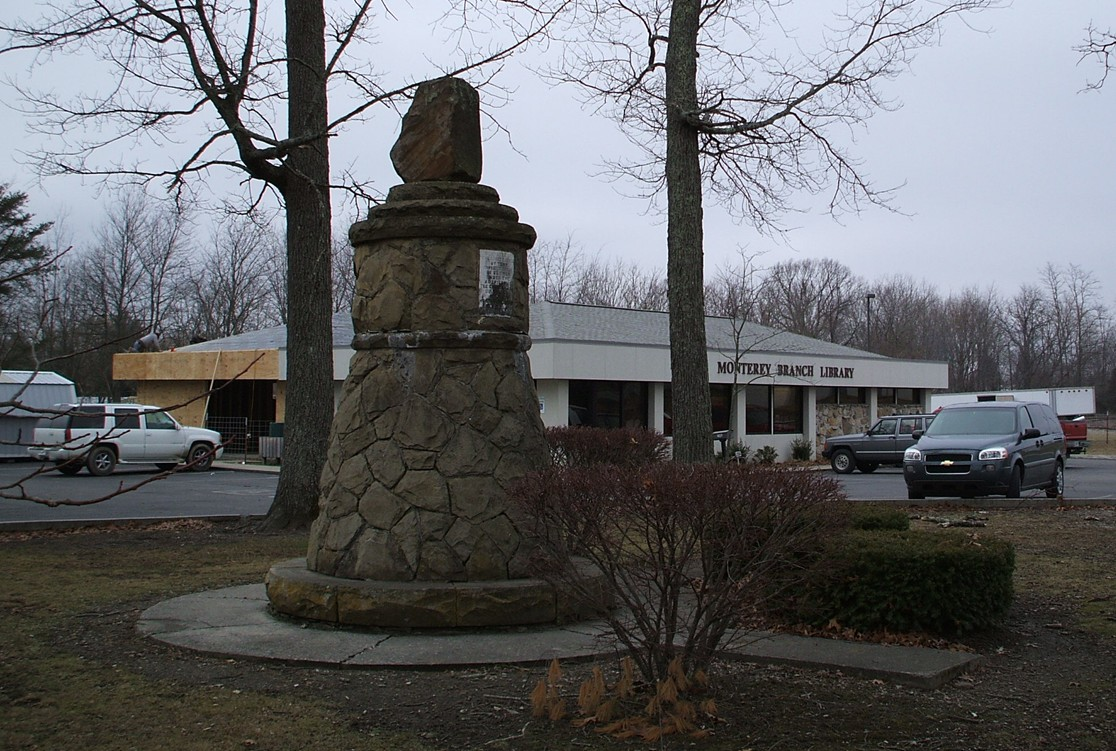
Monterey, Tennessee

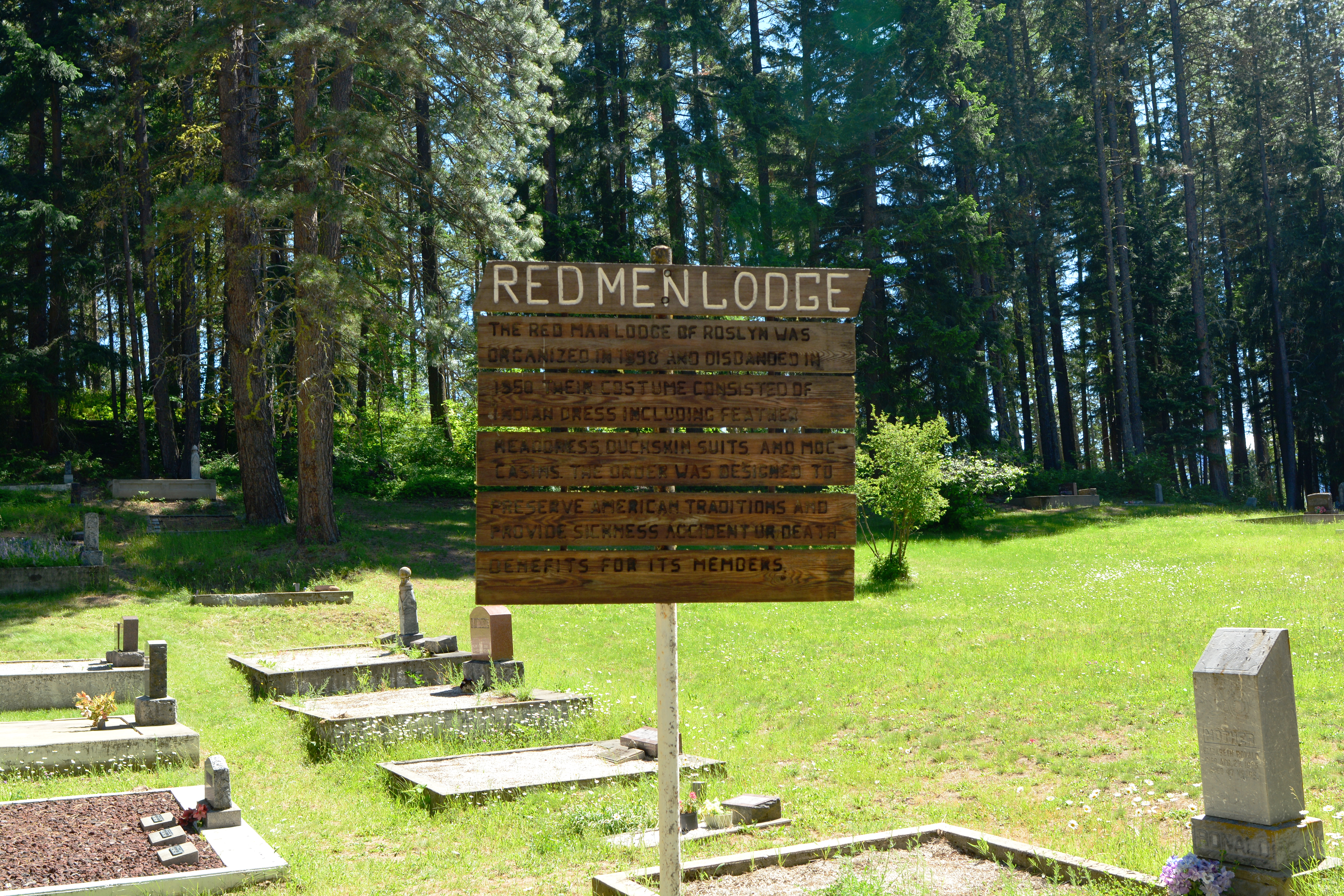
Rosyln, Washington

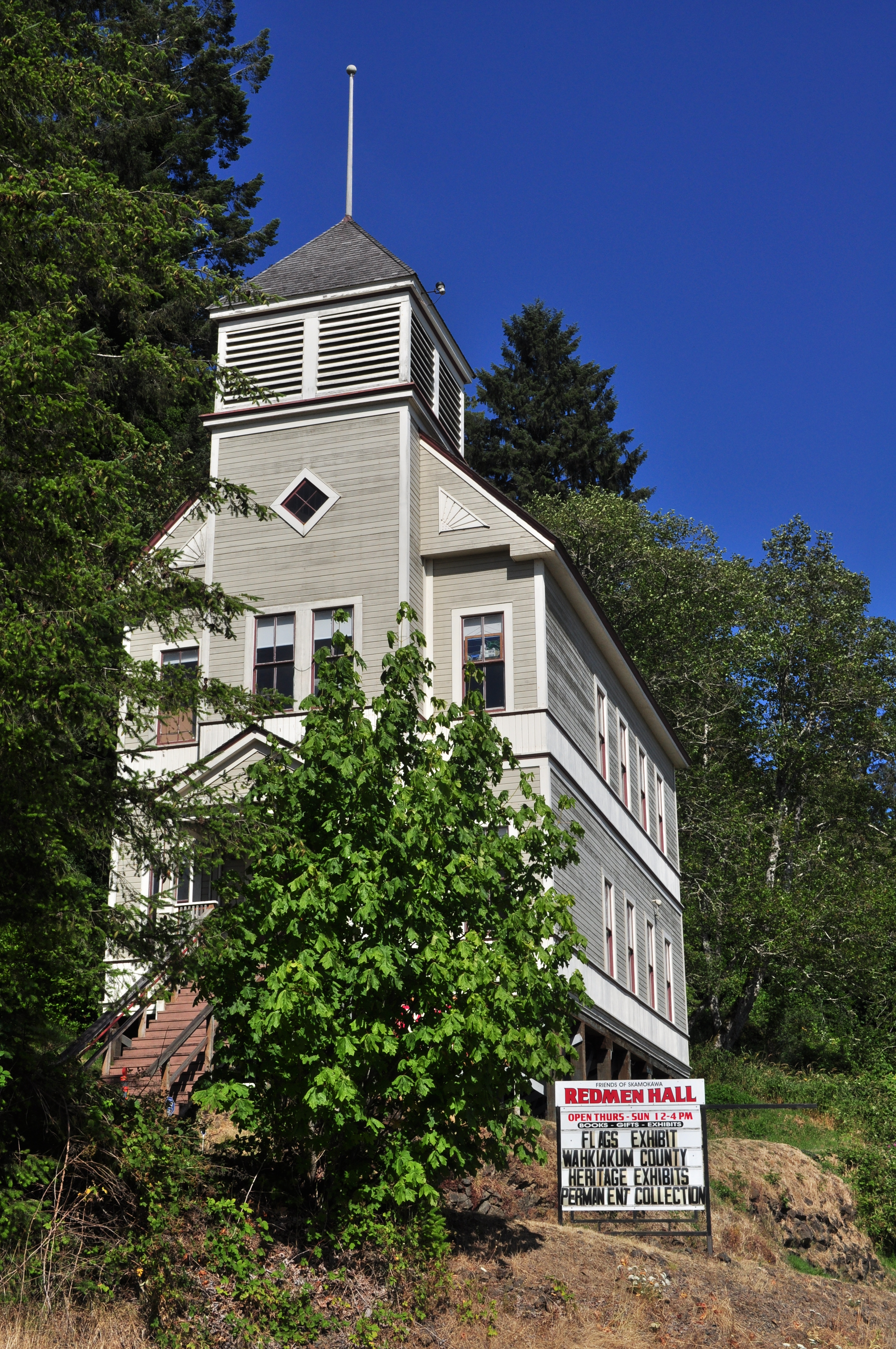
Skamokawa, Washington

== See also ==
- Statue of Mahaska
