= Red Men Hall (Los Angeles) =

Redmen's Hall
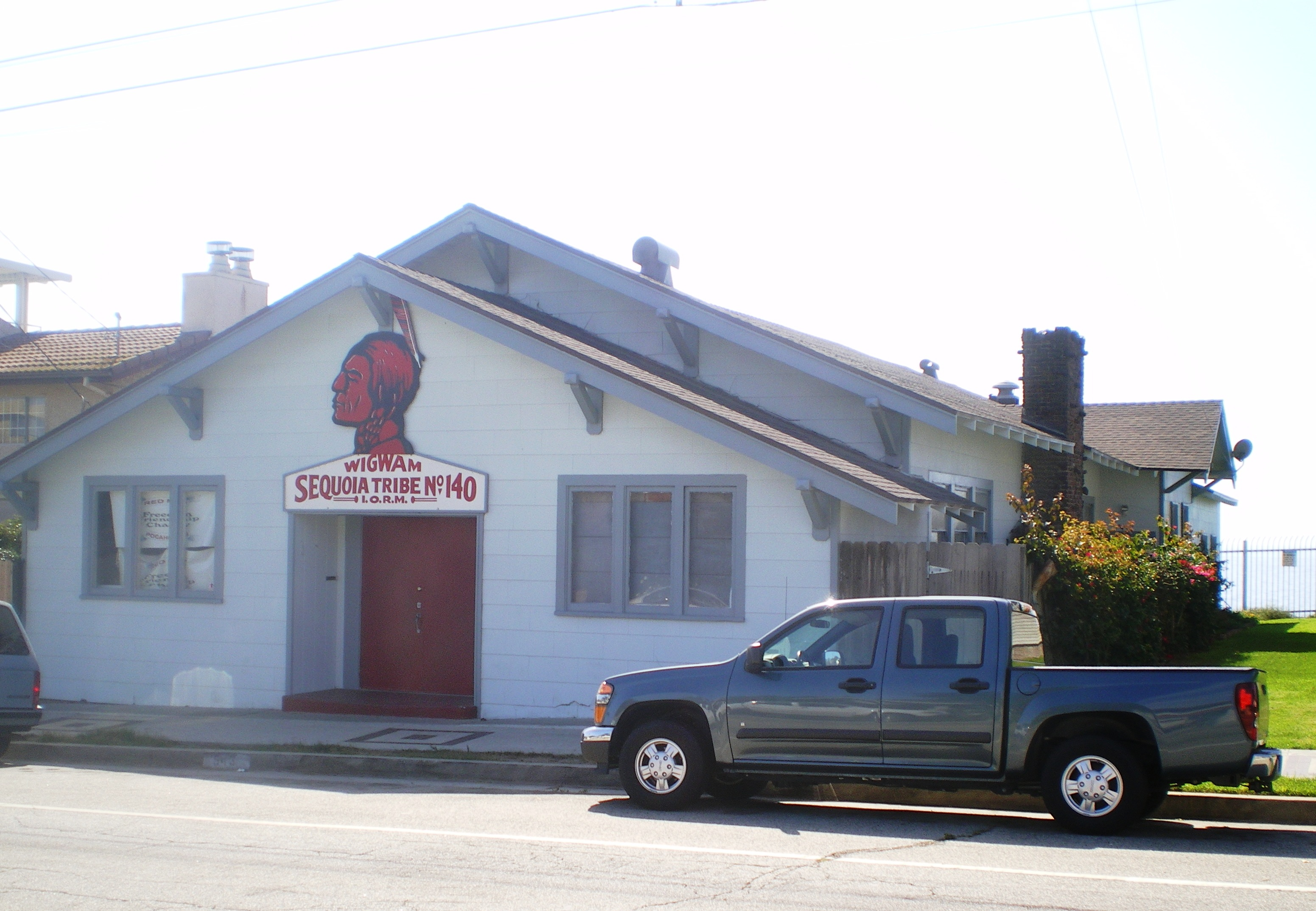
- The hall from Shepard Street

- Location within the Los Angeles metropolitan area
- 33°42′24″N 118°17′20″W
- Location: 543 Shepard Street, San Pedro, Los Angeles, California

History
- Built: 1915

Site notes
- Architectural style: American Craftsman
- Governing body: Private

Los Angeles Historic-Cultural Monument
- Designated: April 29, 2003
- Reference no.: 751

The Red Men Hall, listed as the Redmen's Hall, is a historic structure that houses a fraternal organization near the coast in the San Pedro community of Los Angeles, California.

== Historic structure ==
Initially built as a library in 1915, the hall is a two-story American Craftsman style structure located on a hillside overlooking the Port of Los Angeles. The interior contains local wood paneling and exposed ceiling beams. The City designated the hall as a Los Angeles Historic-Cultural Monument (HCM #751) in 2003.

== Fraternal organization ==
A local lodge of the Improved Order of Red Men, a fraternal organization which draws on customs assumed to be used by Native Americans, has occupied the building for nearly all of its existence. Sequoia Tribe No. 140 remains active in their "San Pedro Wigwam" although the national organization has dwindled in membership.

== See also ==
- List of Improved Order of Red Men buildings and structures
- List of Los Angeles Historic-Cultural Monuments in the Harbor area
