= Deer Park Farm =

Historic house in Delaware, United States

- U.S. National Register of Historic Places
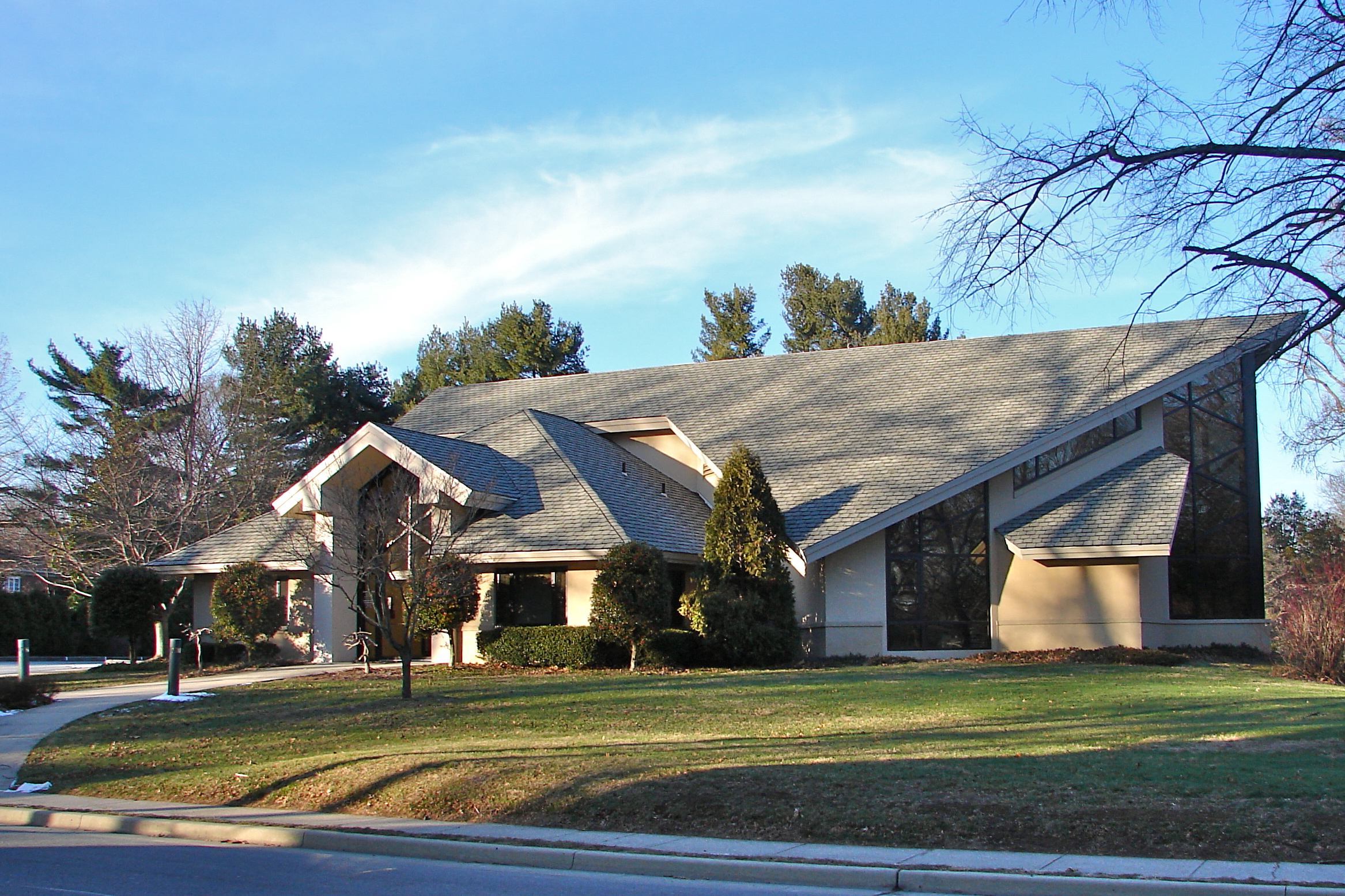
- Deer Park Farm property, December 2010

- Location within Delaware Location within the United States
- Location: 48 W. Park Pl., Newark, Delaware
- Coordinates: 39°40′30″N 75°45′21″W
- Area: 0.6 acres (0.24 ha)
- Built: 1841
- Architectural style: Greek Revival
- MPS: Newark MRA
- NRHP reference No.: 83001347
- Added to NRHP: February 24, 1983

Deer Park Farm was a historic home located at Newark in New Castle County, Delaware. It was also known as the Red Men's Fraternal Home and has since been demolished.

== History ==
It was built in 1841, and was a three-story, five-bay, center-hall-plan with a shallowly-pitched roof in the Greek Revival style. It had a two-story kitchen wing and one-story library wing. It was the home of James S. Martin, a major developer in Newark in the 1840s and 1850s. In 1909, the property was sold to the Improved Order of Red Men, a fraternal organization, who used it to provide a home for retired Red Men and their wives. The Red Men complex included a farm that made it self-sufficient for providing food.

From 1953 to 1971, it housed fraternities. It was added to the National Register of Historic Places in 1983. Since the listing, the house has been demolished and the property occupied by a Christian Science Church.

== See also ==
- Elks National Home
- List of Improved Order of Red Men buildings and structures
- National Register of Historic Places listings in Newark, Delaware
