= Brunswick Heritage Museum =

Railway museum in Brunswick, Maryland

- Museum logo

- Location within Maryland
- Former name: Brunswick Railroad Museum
- Established: c. 1966, 1974
- Location: 40 West Potomac Street, Brunswick, Maryland 21716, USA
- Coordinates: 39.3129637°N 77.6280838°W
- Type: Railroad and history
- Key holdings: Model railroad
- Curator: Rebecca O’Leary
- Owner: Brunswick Potomac Foundation
- Public transit access: Brunswick (MARC station)
- Website: brunswickmuseum.org
- Red Men's Lodge
- U.S. Historic district – Contributing property
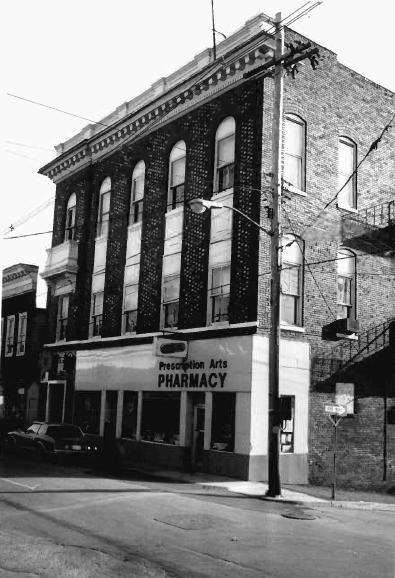
- The building with pharmacy, c. 1978
- Built: 1904
- Built by: Harry B. Funk
- Architectural style: Early Commercial
- Part of: Brunswick Historic District (ID79001128)
- Added to NRHP: August 29, 1979.

The Brunswick Heritage Museum is a railroad and history museum in Brunswick, Maryland.

== History ==
The Brunswick Potomac Foundation was founded in 1966 during the town's 75th Anniversary Diamond Jubilee; it originally focused on organizing local events such as the annual Railroad Days, a street festival held during the first full weekend in October. In 1974, the group purchased a building from a fraternal lodge to establish a museum focused on the town's railroading heritage: the Brunswick Railroad Museum. In 2013, the name was changed to Brunswick Heritage Museum and its mission expanded to include the history of Brunswick, a company town of the Baltimore and Ohio Railroad.

== Building ==
The museum is housed in the former Improved Order of Red Men fraternal lodge, a group that despite its name was limited to white men at that time and bases their rituals on perceived Native American customs. The clubhouse building or "wigwam" was built by the Delaware Tribe No. 43 who occupied the building until 1936. The Fraternal Order of Eagles Brunswick Aerie No. 1136 purchased the building on June 1, 1936, and removed the Native American statue from the entrance. That statue is now on the second floor of the museum. The museum chose the building because it is located less than a block from the Brunswick Line MARC commuter line and four tracks of the CSX mainline.

The 1904 building reflects an early commercial architectural style. The three-story brick facade is dominated by five bays consisting of tall, narrow arches which contain the second and third story windows. The brickwork uses a Flemish bond pattern with glazed headers. The top of the building is partial story consisting of a dentilled cornice with modillions underneath and short pilasters above.

== Collection ==
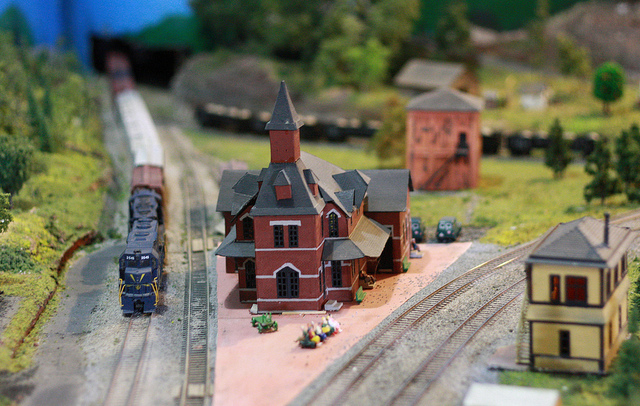
Model of the Point of Rocks Station

The first floor has a play and dress-up area for young children. The second floor focuses on life in Brunswick during various eras, and on the C&O Canal. The third floor includes an HO scale model railroad layout depicting the B&O Railroad's Metropolitan line from Washington, D.C., to Brunswick in the late 1950s. The model also depicts the Brunswick classification yards, which were completed in 1907 and stretched for 5 miles (8.0 km), the largest and most modern in the nation to serve only one railroad company at that time.

== Brunswick Visitor Center ==
The Brunswick Visitor Center is also on the first floor and is maintained by the National Park Service as a tenant. This is a unit of the Chesapeake and Ohio Canal National Historical Park.

== See also ==
- List of museums in Maryland
- List of Improved Order of Red Men buildings and structures
