= Italian Baptist Church =

Historic church in Vermont, United States

- U.S. National Register of Historic Places
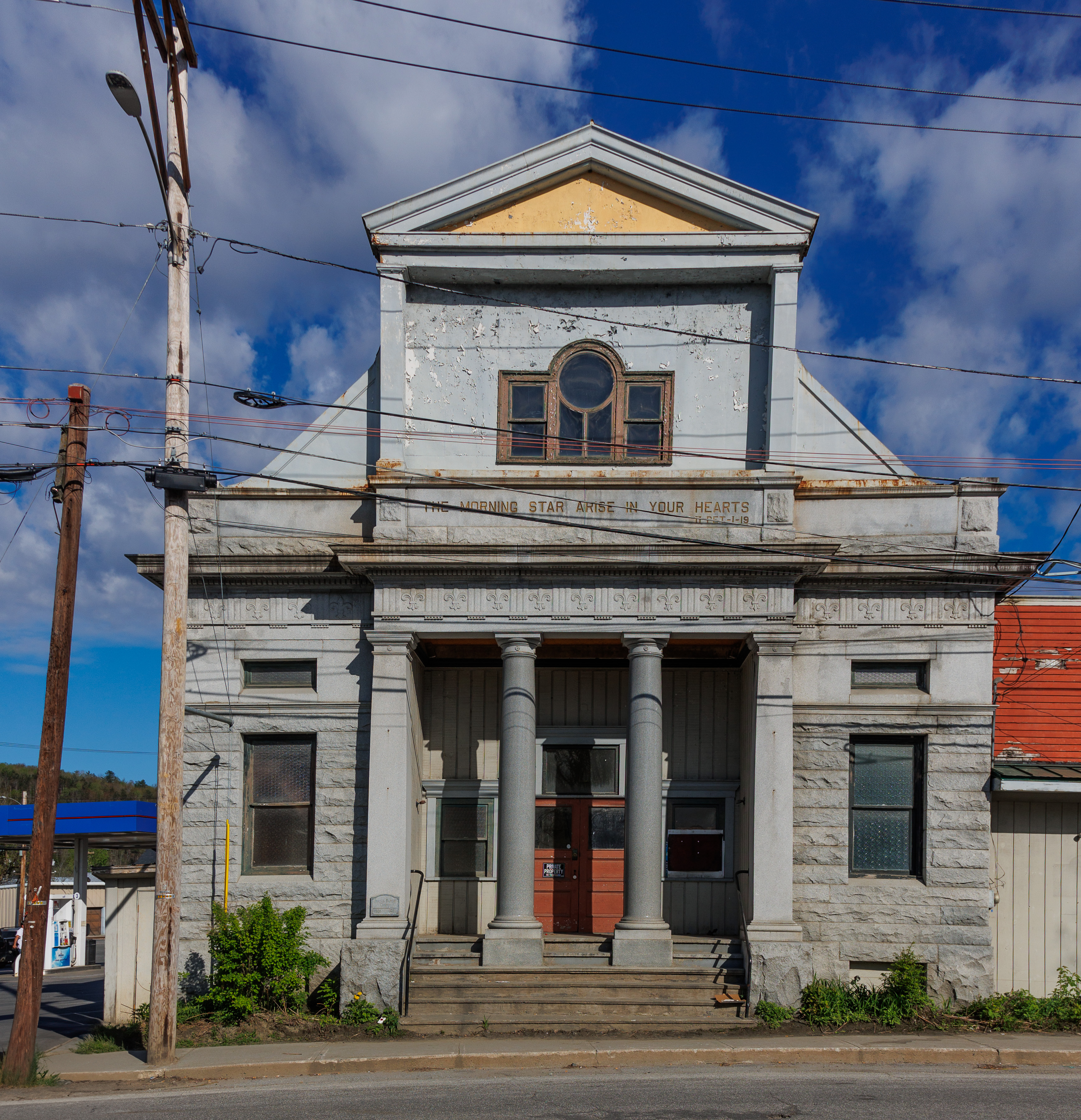

- Location within Vermont Location within the United States
- Location: 10 N. Brook St., City of Barre, Vermont
- Coordinates: 44°12′13″N 72°30′30″W
- Area: less than one acre
- Built: 1906
- Architect: Bellondi, A. B.
- Architectural style: Renaissance
- NRHP reference No.: 75000147
- Added to NRHP: April 23, 1975

The Italian Baptist Church is a historic church at 10 North Brook Street in the city of Barre, Vermont. Built in 1906-08 largely with volunteer labor, it is a distinctive regionalized example of vernacular church architecture more typically found in northern Italy. It was listed on the National Register of Historic Places in 1975.

== Architecture and history ==
The Italian Baptist Church stands just off North Main Street, north of Barre's downtown business district. It is set on the north side of Brook Street, between North Main and Laurel Streets. It is a single-story structure, built with a wooden frame and masonry exterior. The side walls are brick, while the street-facing main facade is an elaborately decorated work of granite. A central recess is defined by a pair of polished Doric columns and flanked by square pilasters, all supporting a slightly projecting dentillated entablature. The entablature is continued to the main building corners, and is topped by a cornice and a central gabled parapet, at whose center is a Palladian window. The stonework of the facade exhibits a variety of finishes, from rusticated blocks on the lower level, to hammered details in the entablature, and the smoothly finished columns.

The church was built in 1906-08 by local volunteers, including many Italian immigrants who came to work in Barre's granite quarries. The design of the building is credited to the priest, A.B. Bellondi, under whose tenure it was built. It is essentially a vernacular interpretation of northern Italian church architecture, built using local materials. The church was in active use by its Baptist congregation until the 1920s. In the 1930s the church was used as a clubhouse by the Improved Order of Red Men, a fraternal society. It has since seen a variety of commercial and religious uses.

== See also ==
- List of Improved Order of Red Men buildings and structures
- National Register of Historic Places listings in Washington County, Vermont
