= Hill's Academy =

- U.S. National Register of Historic Places
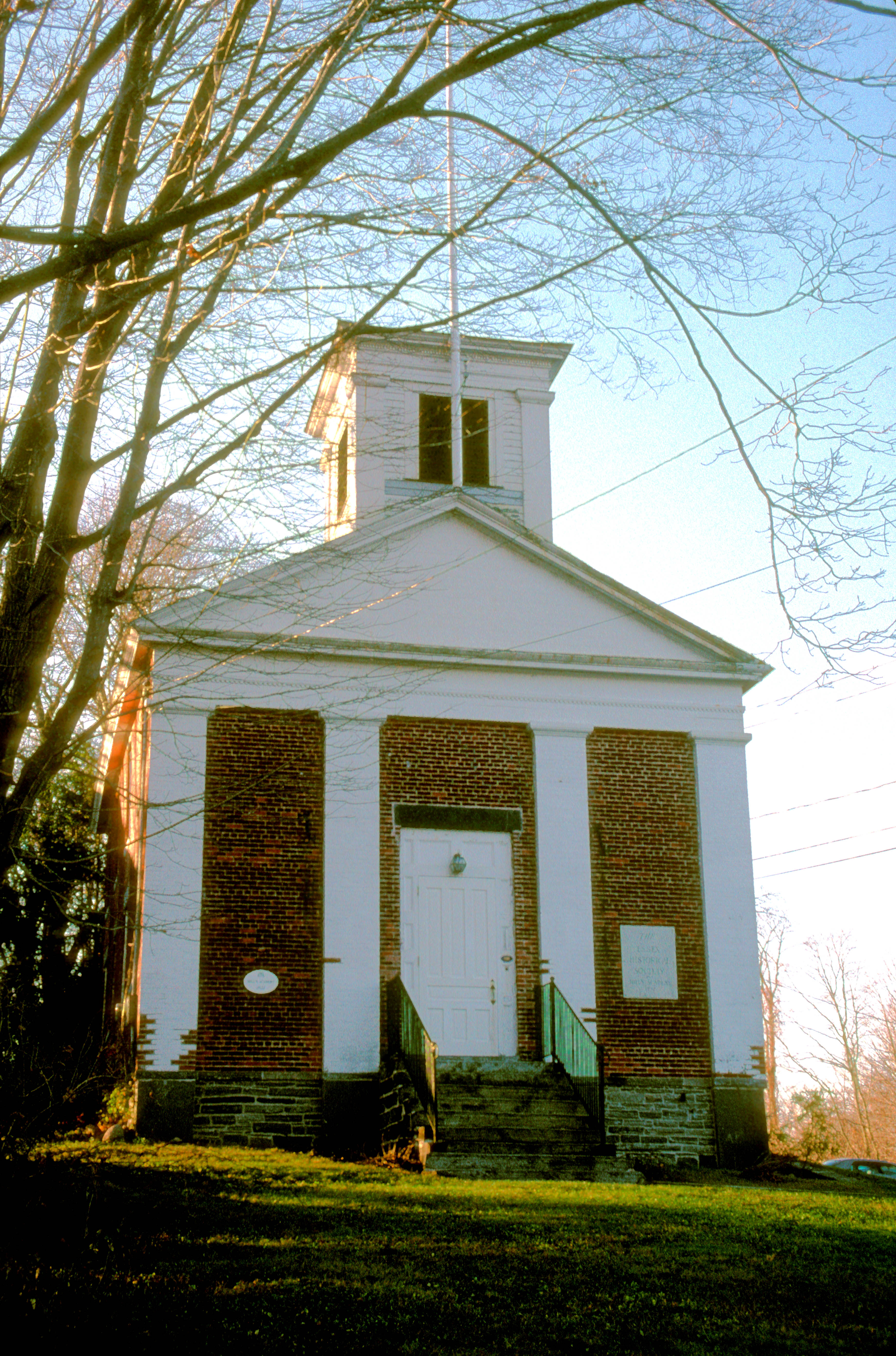

- Location within Connecticut Location within the United States
- Location: 22 Prospect Street, Essex, Connecticut
- Coordinates: 41°21′14″N 72°23′34″W
- Area: 0.3 acres (0.12 ha)
- Built: 1832
- Architectural style: Greek Revival
- NRHP reference No.: 85001831
- Added to NRHP: August 23, 1985

Hill's Academy is a historic school building at 22 Prospect Street in Essex, Connecticut. It is now the home of the Essex Historical Society, and was also historically known as the Red Men's Hall because it served as an Improved Order of Red Men lodge. It is a two-story Greek Revival building that was built in 1832, and was used as a school until 1910. It was used by the Improved Order of Red Men between 1915 and 1954. The town then established the Essex Historical Society to receive the property and to preserve local history. The building was listed on the National Register of Historic Places in 1985.

== Architecture ==
The academy building occupies a prominent location overlooking Essex's Main Street area, facing east on the west side of Prospect Street just south of the Congregational and Baptist churches. It is a two-story brick building, with a gabled roof capped by a squat single-stage belfry. The front facade is three bays wide, articulated by brick pilasters painted white, which rise to an entablature and fully pedimented gable. Pilasters are also found at the corners of the wood-framed belfry, which has rectangular louvered openings. The main entrance is in the central bay, while the flanking bays are blank. The interior has an entrance vestibule, from which narrow stairs wind to the second floor on the right. Each floor has a single large chamber, which functioned as classrooms during the building's academy phase. Original finishes include wood flooring and staircase trim.

== History ==
The academy was founded in 1831 through the efforts of John Hill, a local businessman, and this building was completed the following year. It was one of the first secondary schools in southern Connecticut, providing the equivalent of a junior high school education to students from as far away as the states in the American South. By 1892, the town had an established public high school, and the academy was dissolved in 1902, its building turned over to the town.

== See also ==
- Pratt House (Essex, Connecticut), also owned by Essex Historical Society and NRHP-listed
- National Register of Historic Places listings in Middlesex County, Connecticut
- List of Improved Order of Red Men buildings and structures
- List of historical societies in Connecticut
