= Lovettsville Historic District =

Historic district in Virginia, United States

- U.S. National Register of Historic Places
- U.S. Historic district
- Virginia Landmarks Register
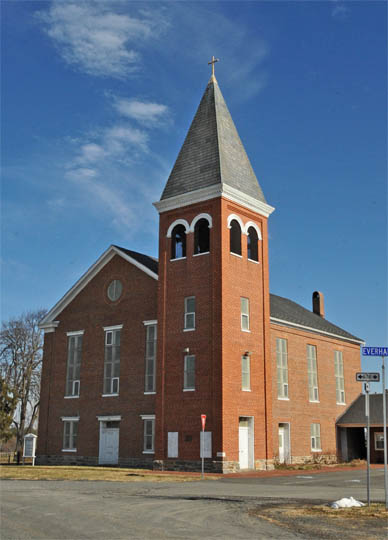
- New Jerusalem Lutheran Church

- Location within Northern Virginia Location within Virginia Location within the United States
- Location: Roughly N. & S. Berlin Pike, E. Broad Way, S. Light, S. Locust, & S. Loudoun Sts., Lovettsville Rd., Lovettsville, Virginia
- Coordinates: 39°16′22″N 77°38′12″W
- Area: 90 acres (36 ha)
- Built: c. 1770
- Architectural style: Federal, Queen Anne, Italianate, Romanesque, Bungalow/Craftsman
- NRHP reference No.: 12000518
- VLR No.: 255-5001

Significant dates
- Added to NRHP: August 10, 2012
- Designated VLR: June 21, 2012

Lovettsville Historic District is a national historic district located at Lovettsville, Loudoun County, Virginia. It contains 174 contributing buildings, 5 contributing sites, and 2 contributing structures in a primarily residential section of Lovettsville. Most contributing resources consist of residences and associated outbuildings dating from the early-19th to early-20th centuries. They are vernacular interpretations of a variety of popular architectural styles including Federal, Queen Anne, Italianate, Romanesque, and Bungalow. Notable resources include the Lovettsville Union Cemetery, First German Reformed Church site and cemetery, New Jerusalem Lutheran Church (1869, 1903) and cemetery, Union Cemetery, African-American Methodist Episcopal Church (c. 1870) and cemetery, Presbyterian cemetery, Lovettsville Masonic Lodge (1869, 1923), former Grubbs Store (c. 1870), former Red Men's Lodge (1923), and Willard Hall (c. 1820).

It was listed on the National Register of Historic Places in 2012.

== Gallery ==
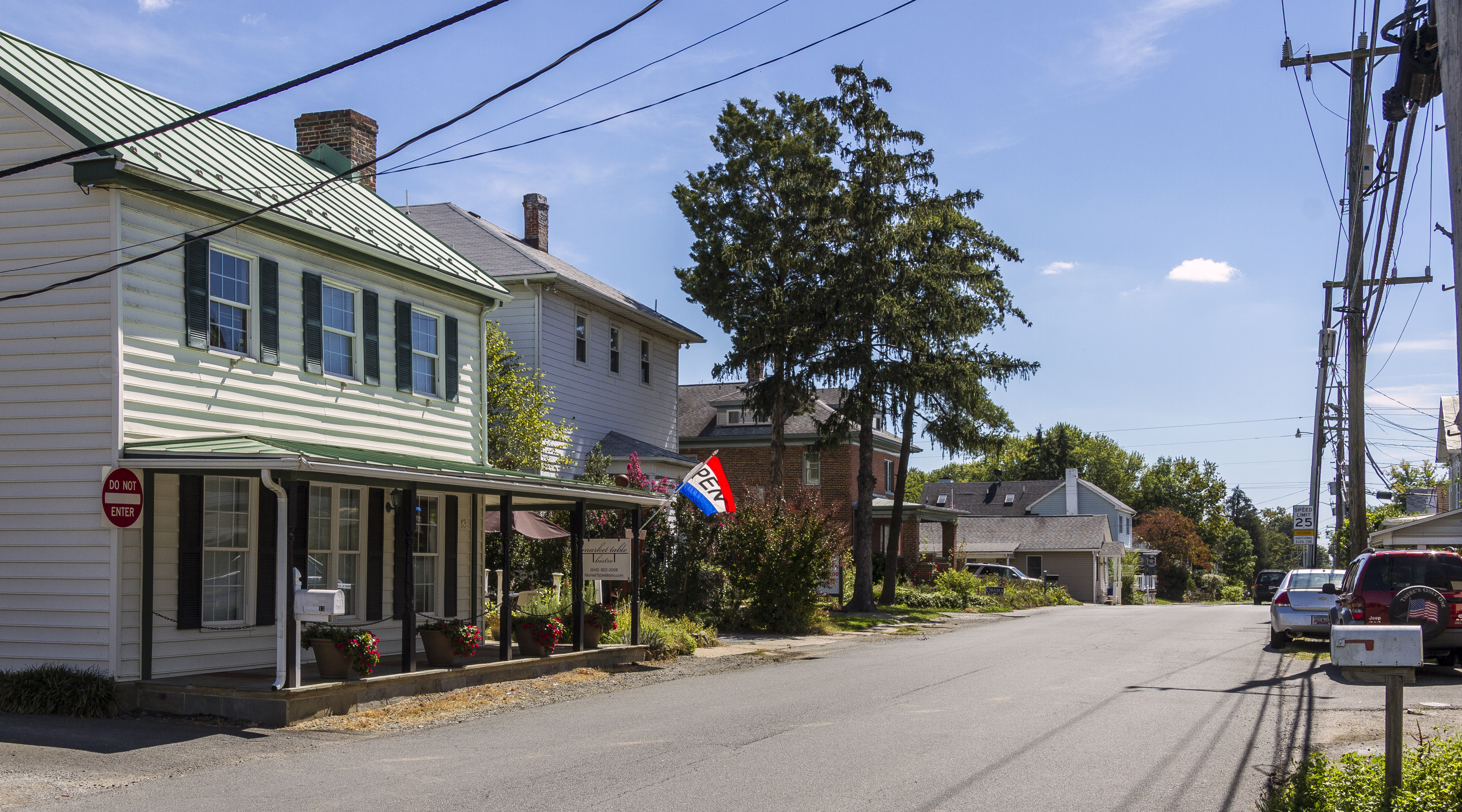
Lovettsville Historic District, September 2012

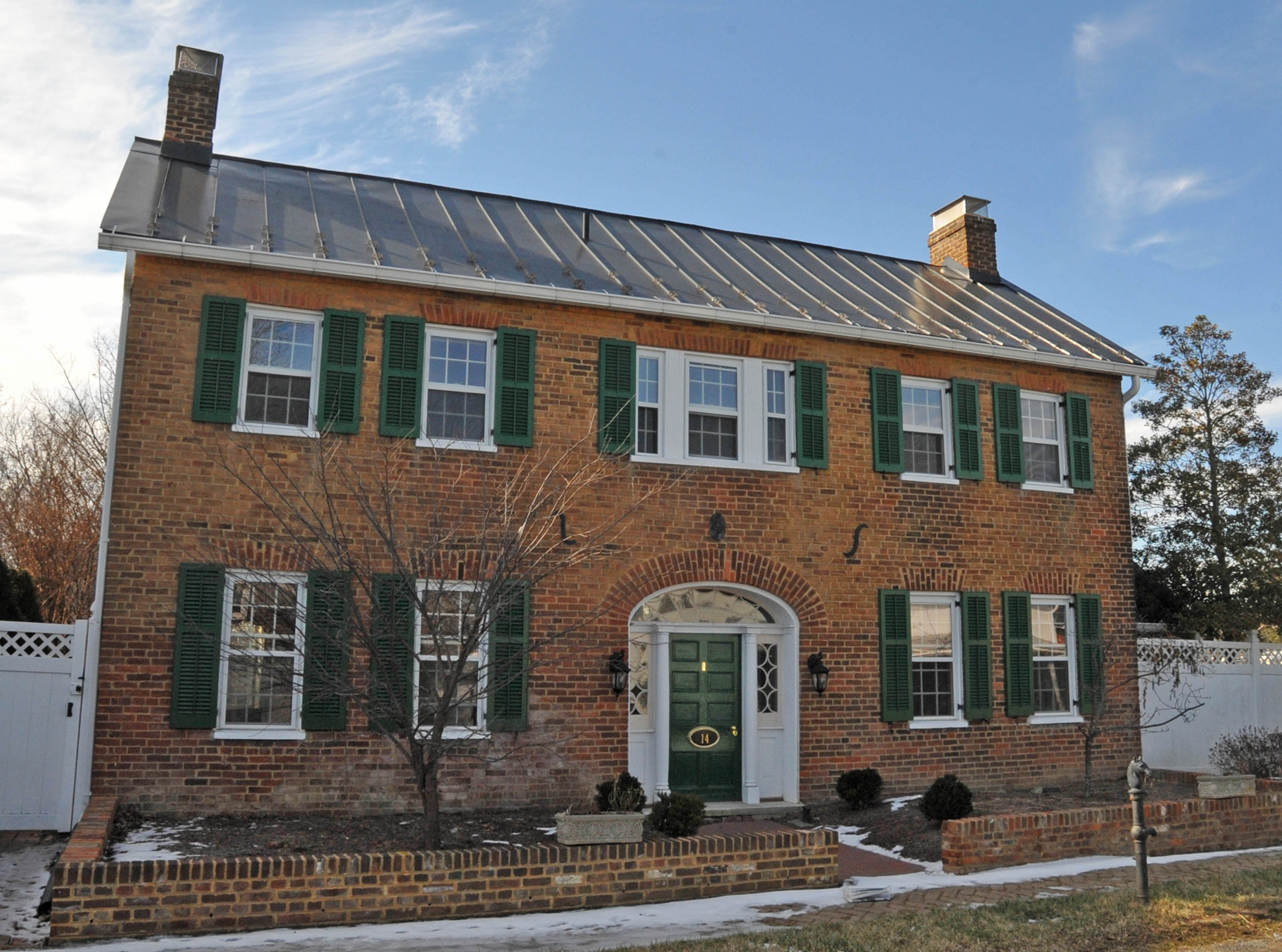
Willard Hall

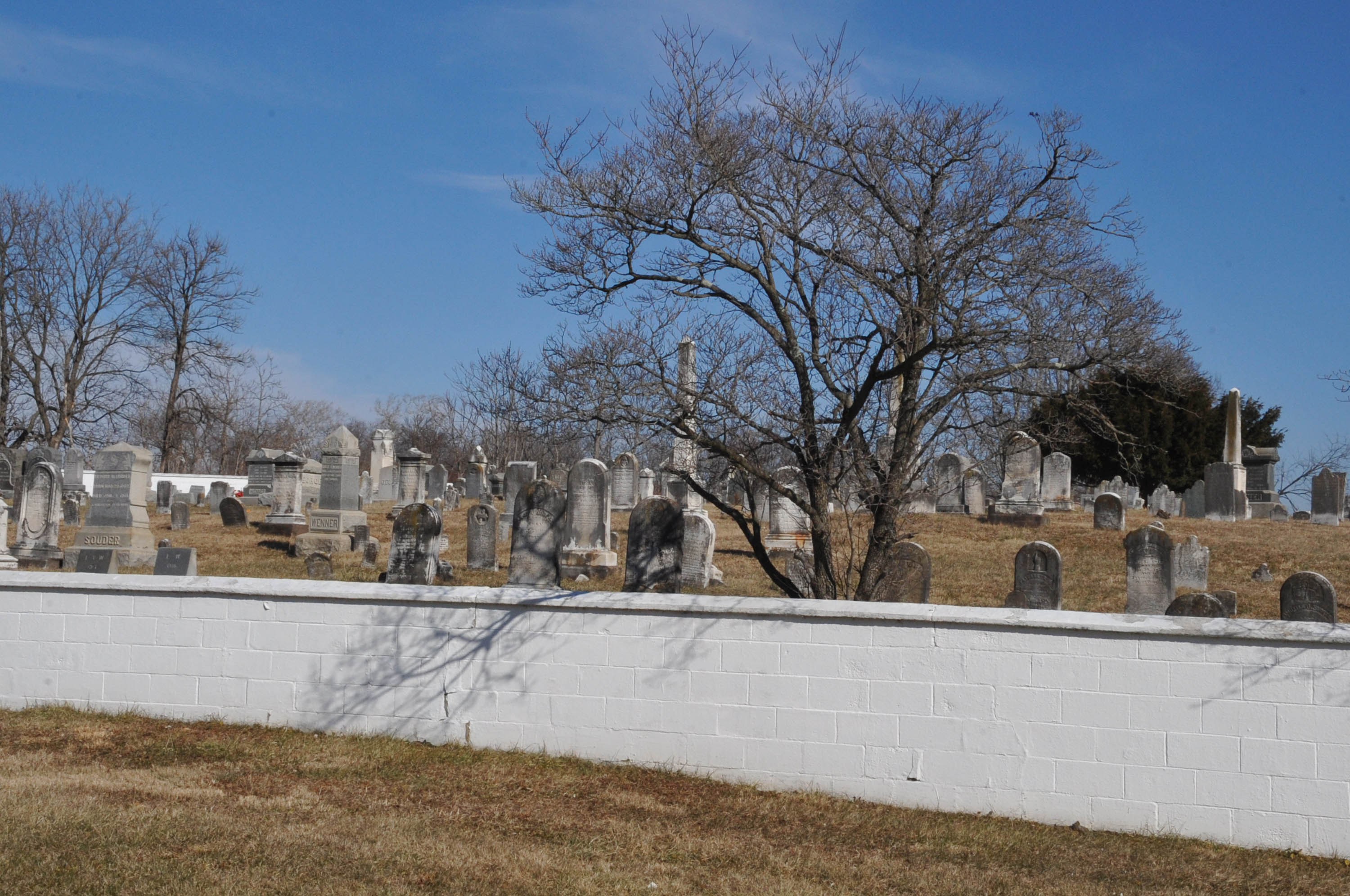
German Reformed Cemetery

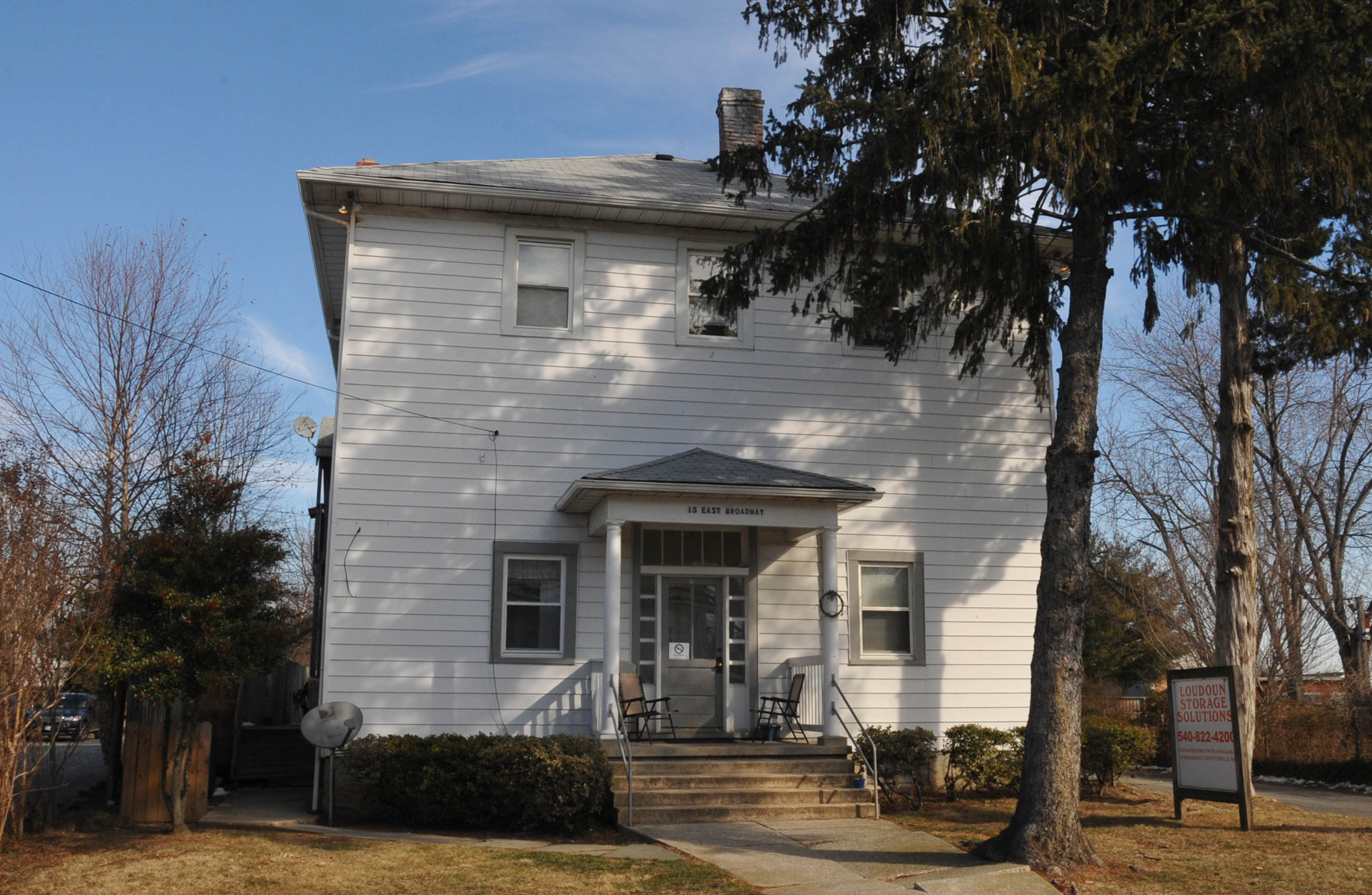
Red Men Hall
