= Brunswick Historic District =

Historic district in Maryland, United States

- U.S. National Register of Historic Places
- U.S. Historic district
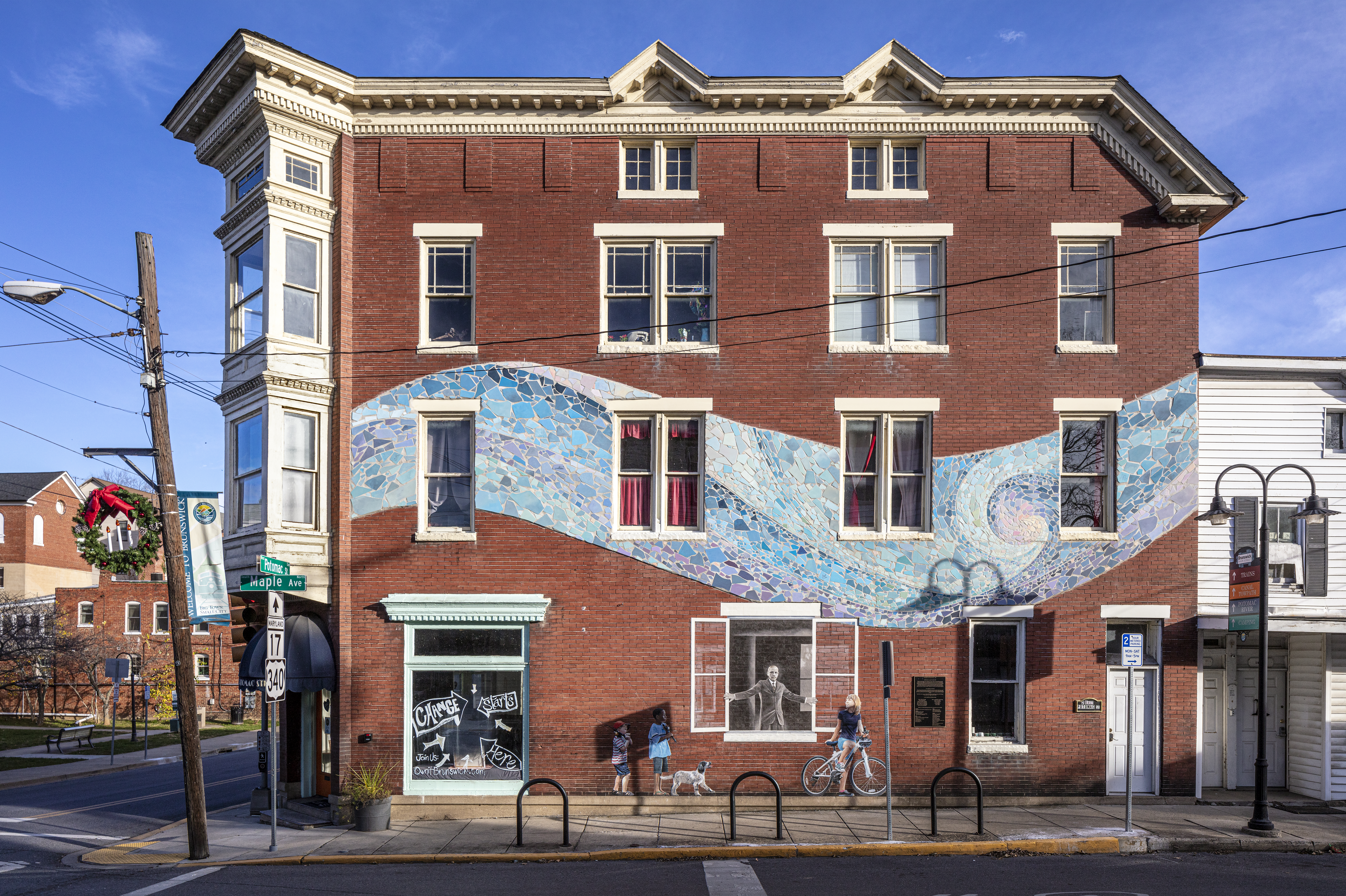
- A downtown mural in 2020

- Location within Maryland Location within the United States
- Location: Roughly bounded by Potomac River, Central, Park and 10th Aves., and C St., Brunswick, Maryland
- Coordinates: 39°18′41″N 77°37′30″W
- Area: 320 acres (130 ha)
- Built: 1890
- Architectural style: Gothic, Italianate, Queen Anne
- NRHP reference No.: 79001128
- Added to NRHP: August 29, 1979

The Brunswick Historic District includes the historic center of the railroad town of Brunswick, Maryland. The district includes the 18th century former town of Berlin, the Baltimore and Ohio Railroad yards along the Potomac River, and the town built between 1890 and 1910 to serve the railroad.

Brunswick Historic District was listed on the National Register of Historic Places in 1979. Both the B&O Station and the Red Men Hall are contributing properties.

== Gallery ==
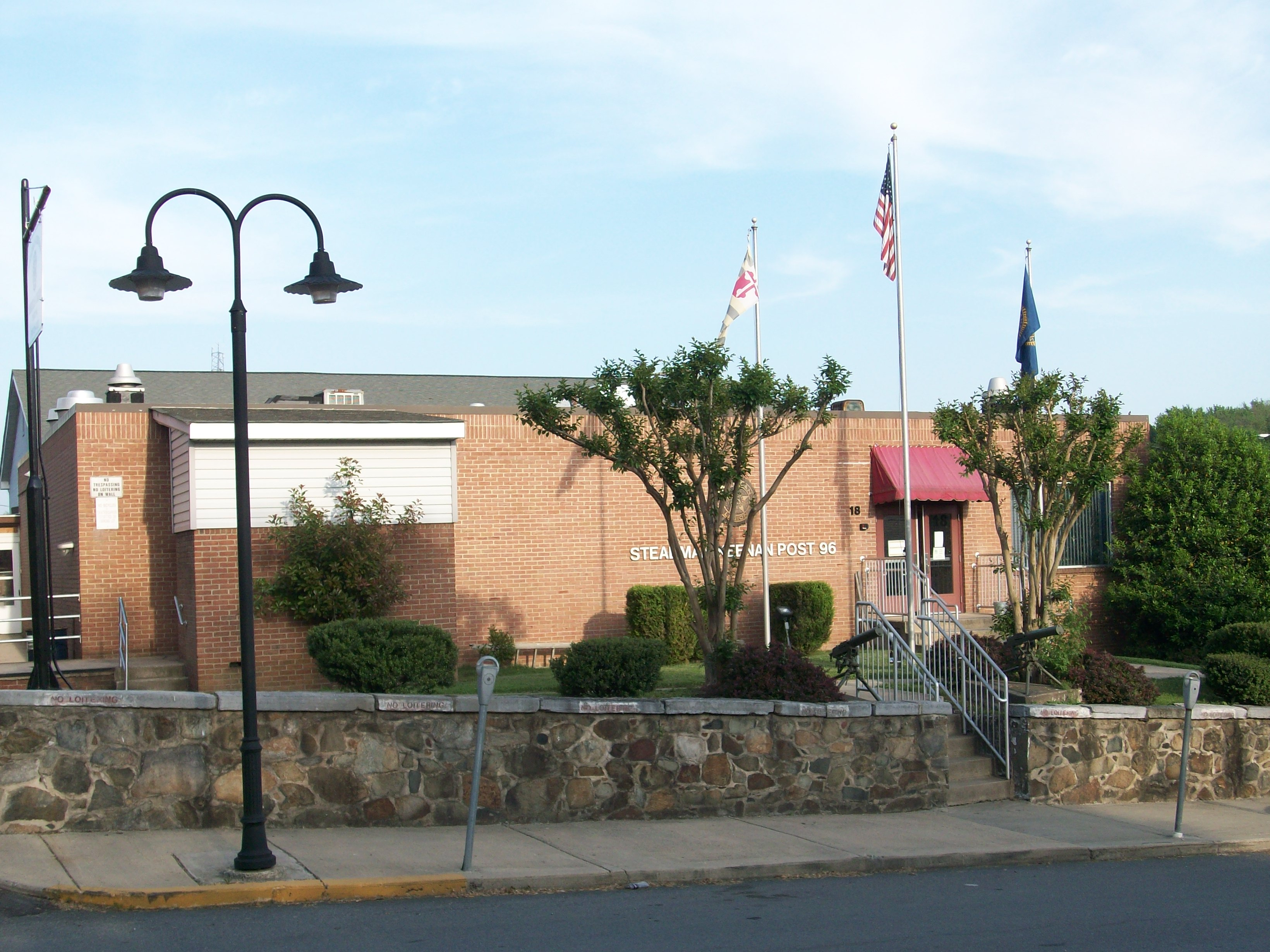
American Legion

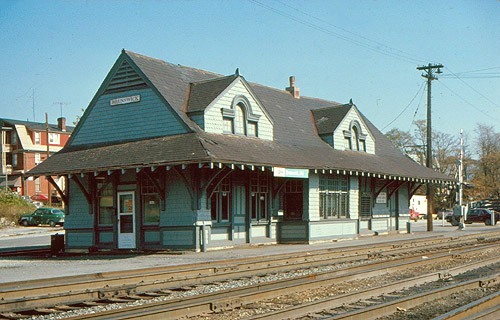
B&O Station

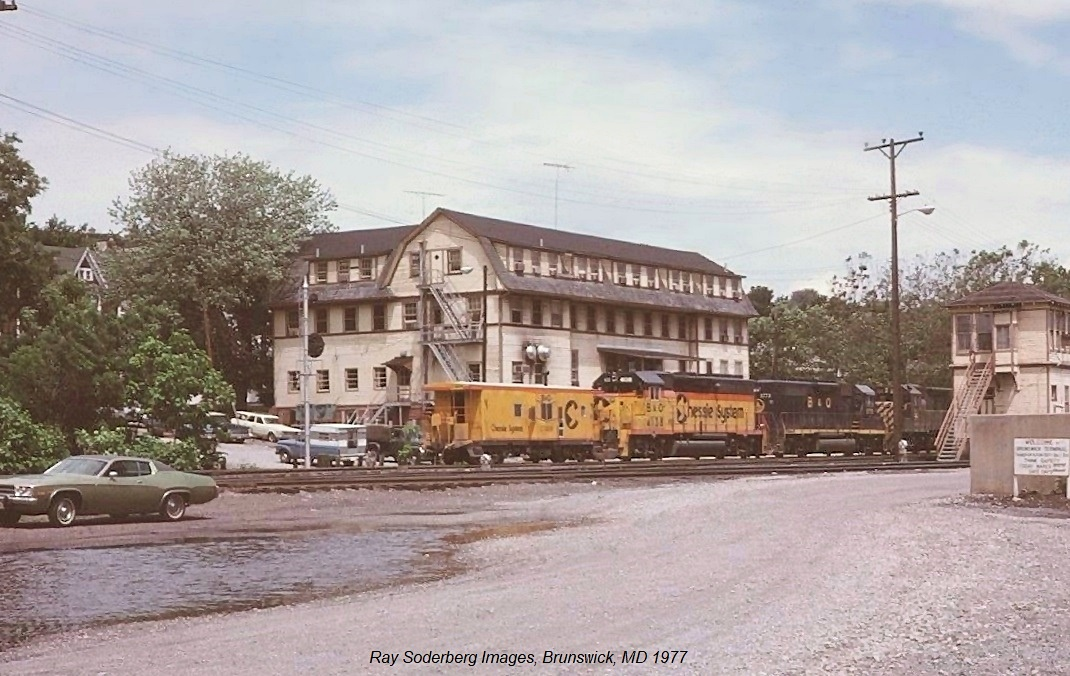
B&O YMCA

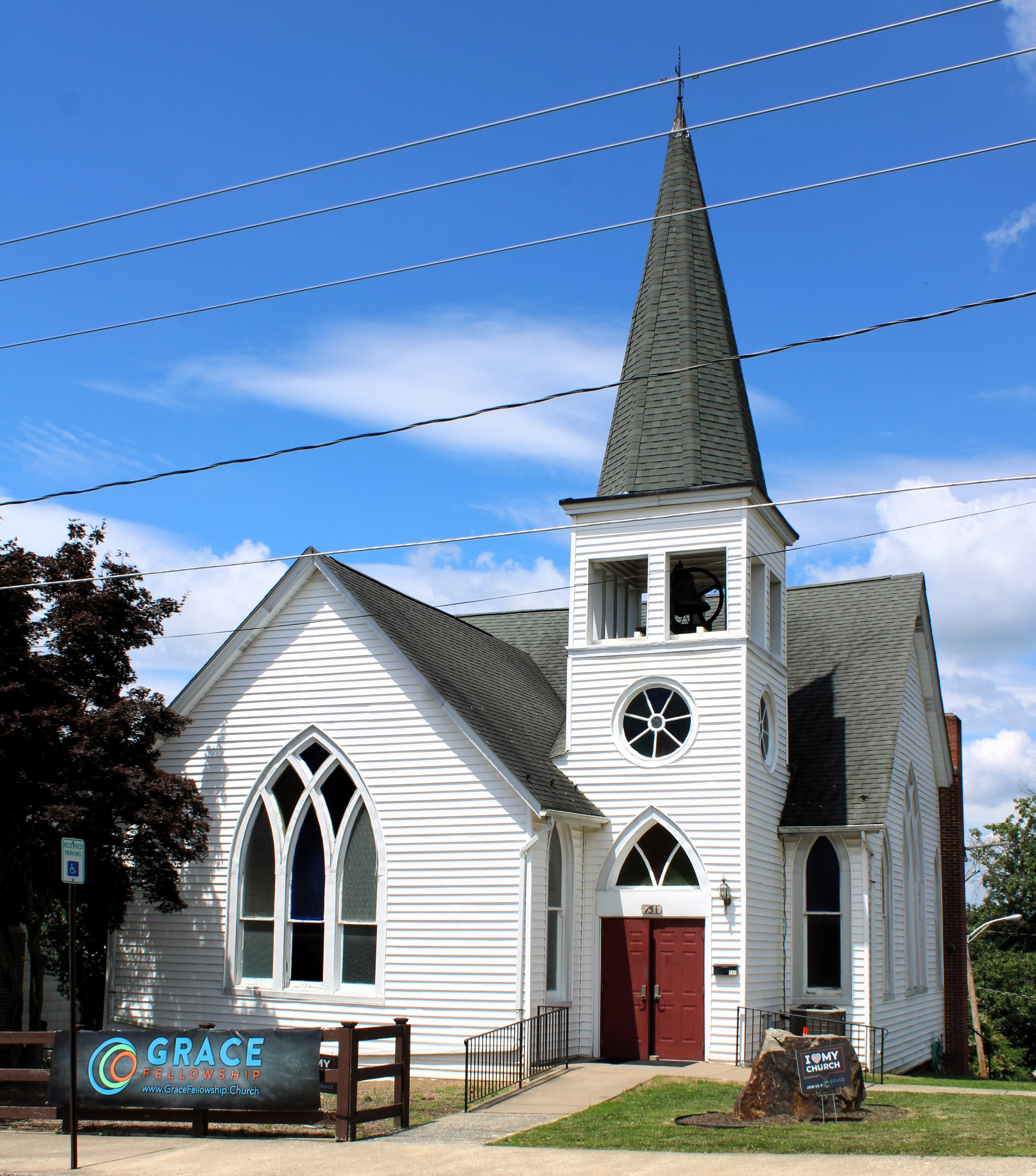
Grace Church

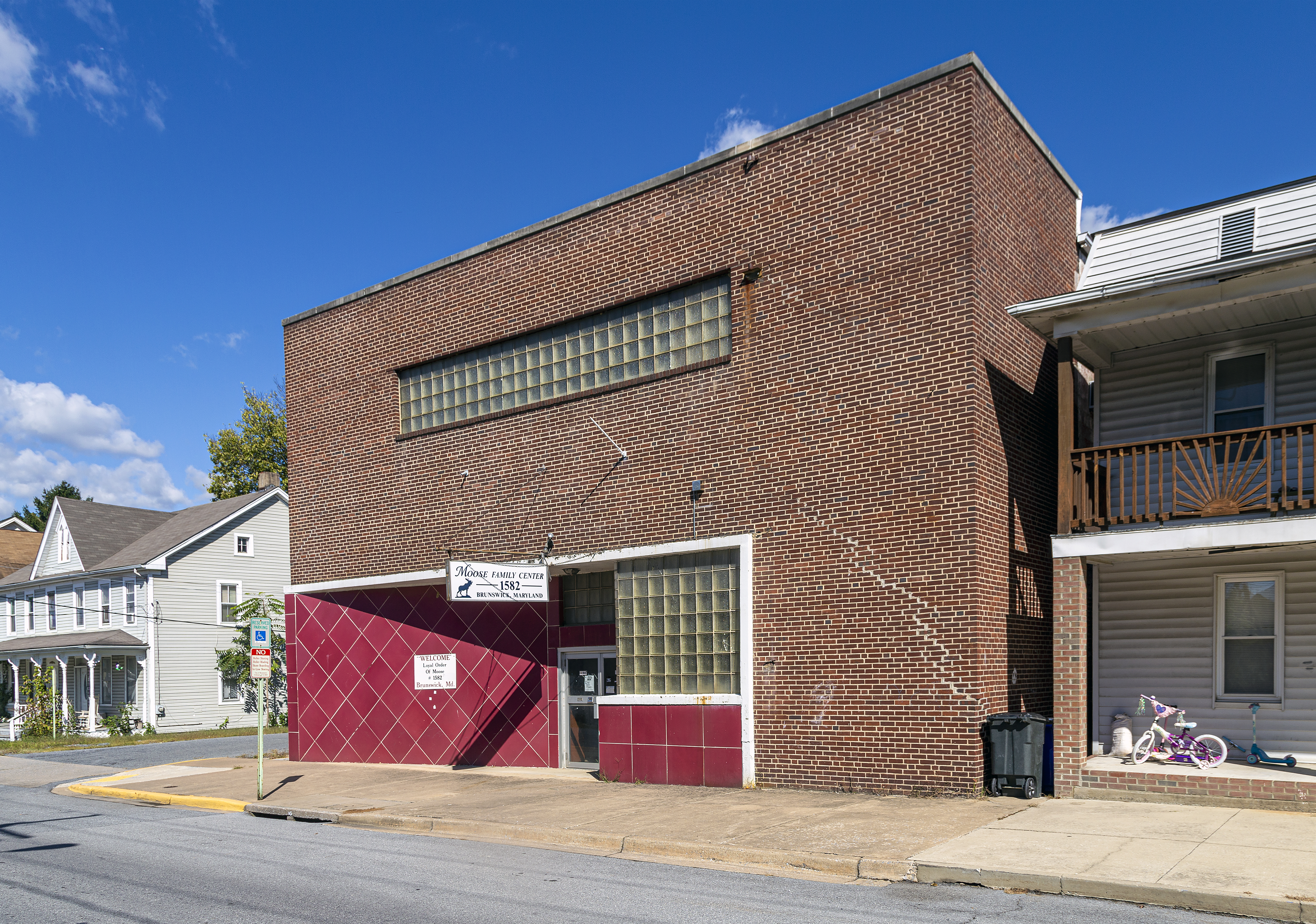
Moose Lodge

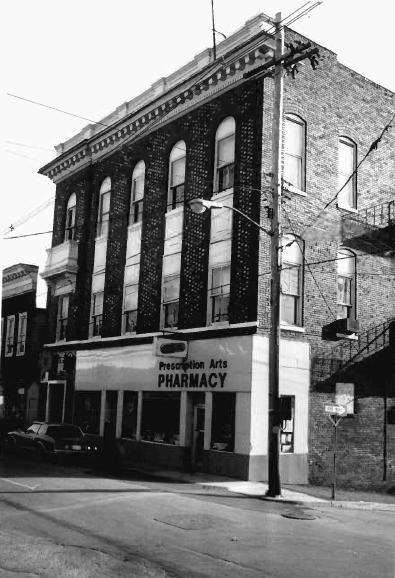
Red Men Hall

== See also ==
- National Register of Historic Places listings in Frederick County, Maryland
