= List of German student corps members =

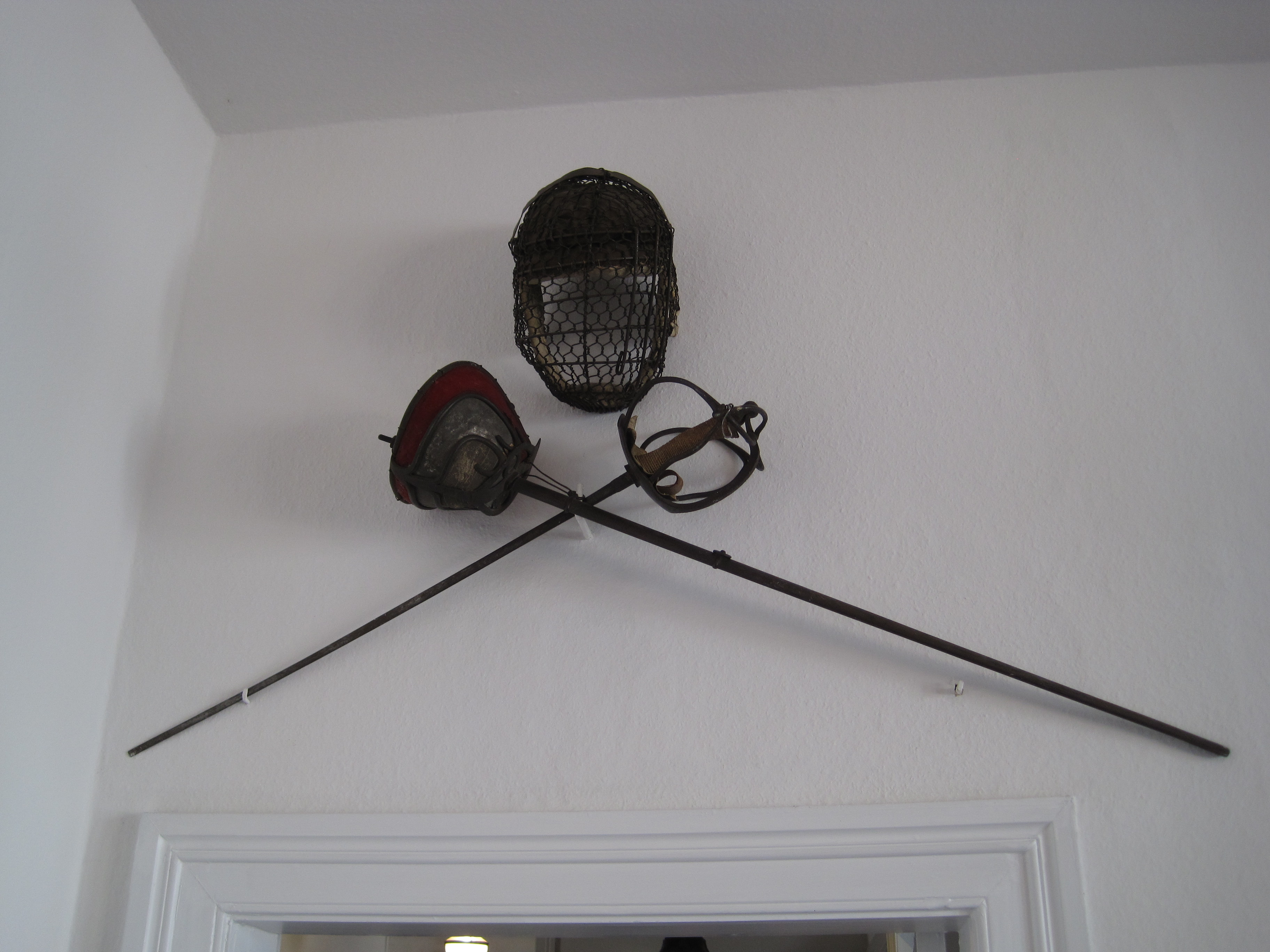
Bismarck's student sword in Friedrichsruh Museum

List of notable or known members of German Student Corps.

== A ==
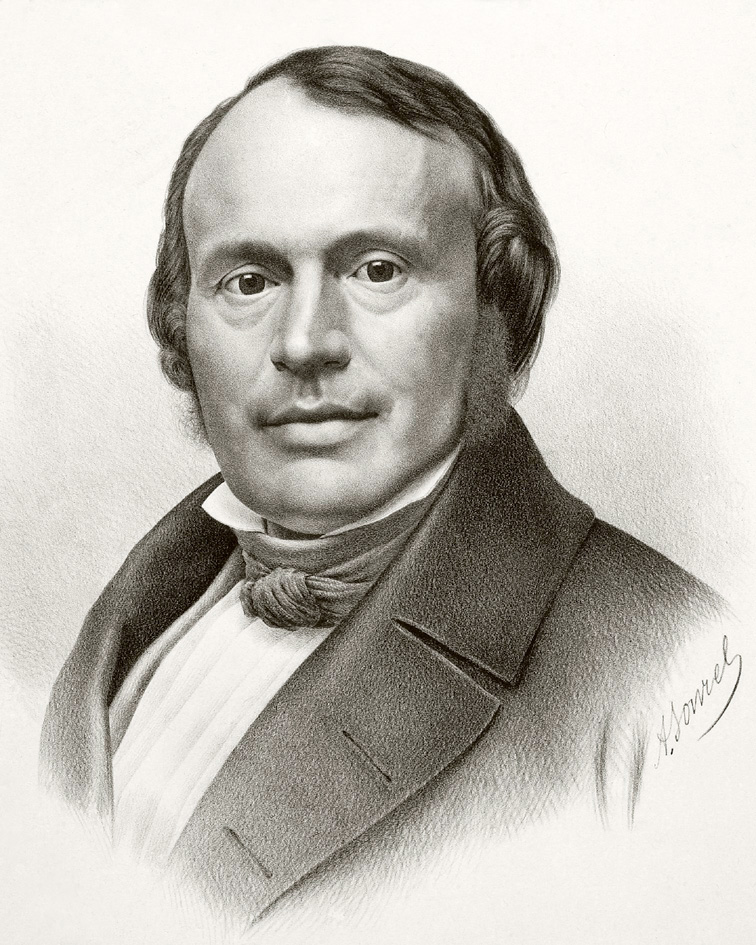
Harvard University Professor Louis Agassiz

- Karl von Abel (1788–1859), Bavarian statesmen
- Horst Ademeit (1912–1944), engineer, fighter pilot, Knight's Cross of the Iron Cross with Oak Leaves; Corps Masovia Königsberg
- Louis Agassiz (1807–1873), Swiss paleontologist, glaciologist, geologist; professor of natural history at University of Neuchâtel and Harvard University, Corps Helvetia Heidelberg, Corps Helvetia Munich
- Heinrich Albers-Schönberg (1865–1921), gynecologist, pioneer of radiology; Corps Suevia Tübingen, Corps Misnia Leipzig
- Heinrich Albert (1874–1960), commercial attaché to the German ambassador to the United States during World War I
- Carl Theodor Albrecht (1843–1915), German astronomer
- Karl Allmenröder (1896–1917), German World War I ace; Corps Teutonia Marburg
- Alois Alzheimer (1864–1915), psychiatrist and neuropathologist; Corps Franconia Würzburg
- Richard Andree (1835–1912), geographer; Corps Lusatia Leipzig
- Asfa-Wossen Asserate (b. 1948), management consultant and author writing in German, a member of the Solomonic dynasty; Corps Suevia Tübingen
- William Backhouse Astor, Sr. (1792–1875), American businessman; Corps Curonia Göttingen

== B ==
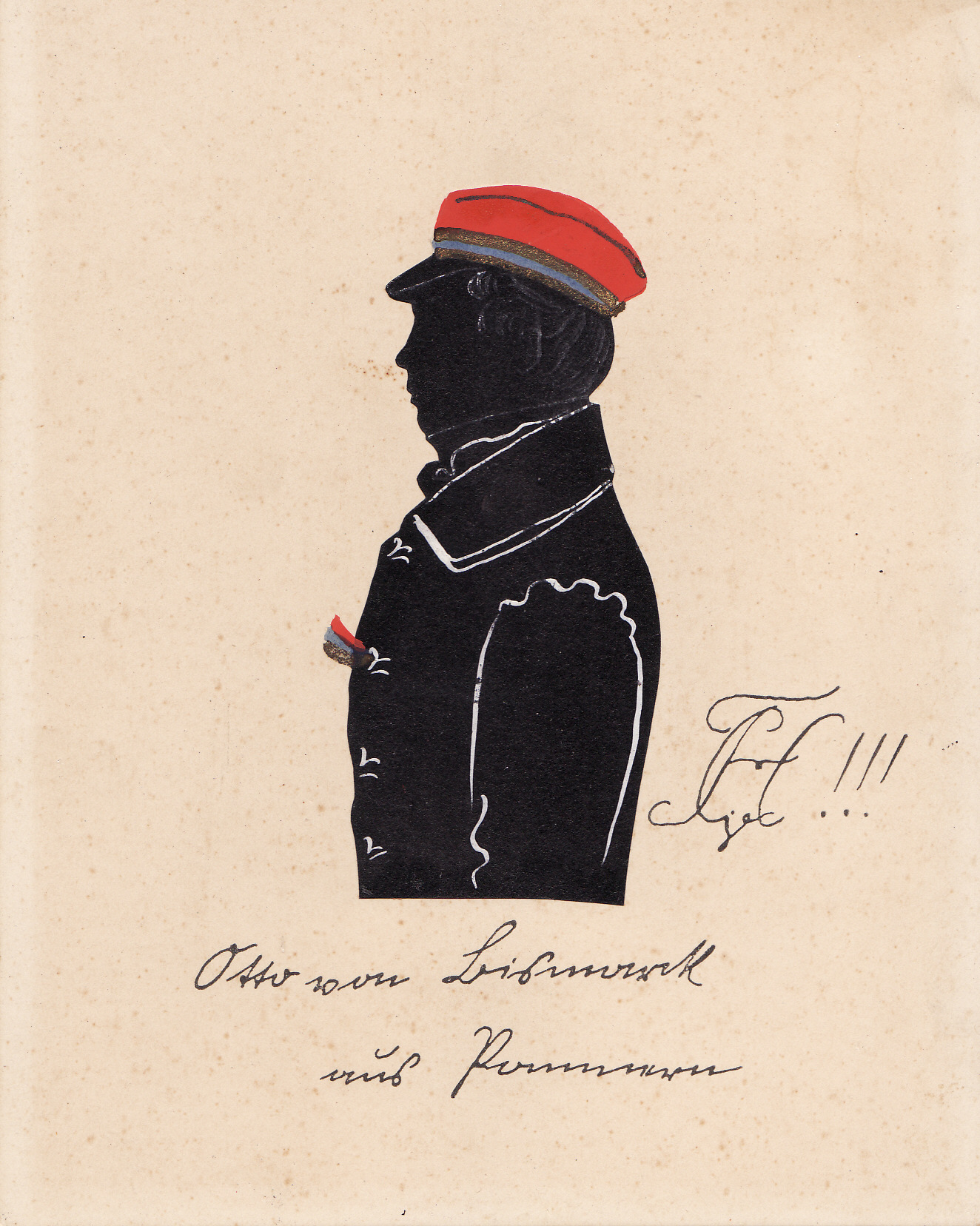
Chancellor of the German Empire Otto von Bismarck

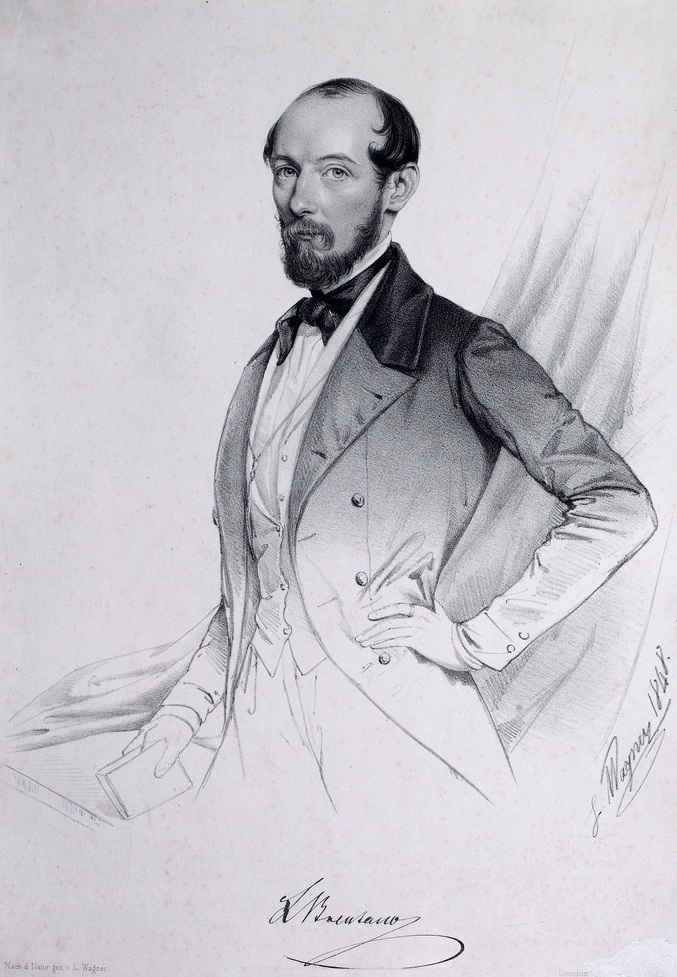
Lorenzo Brentano, Representative from Illinois

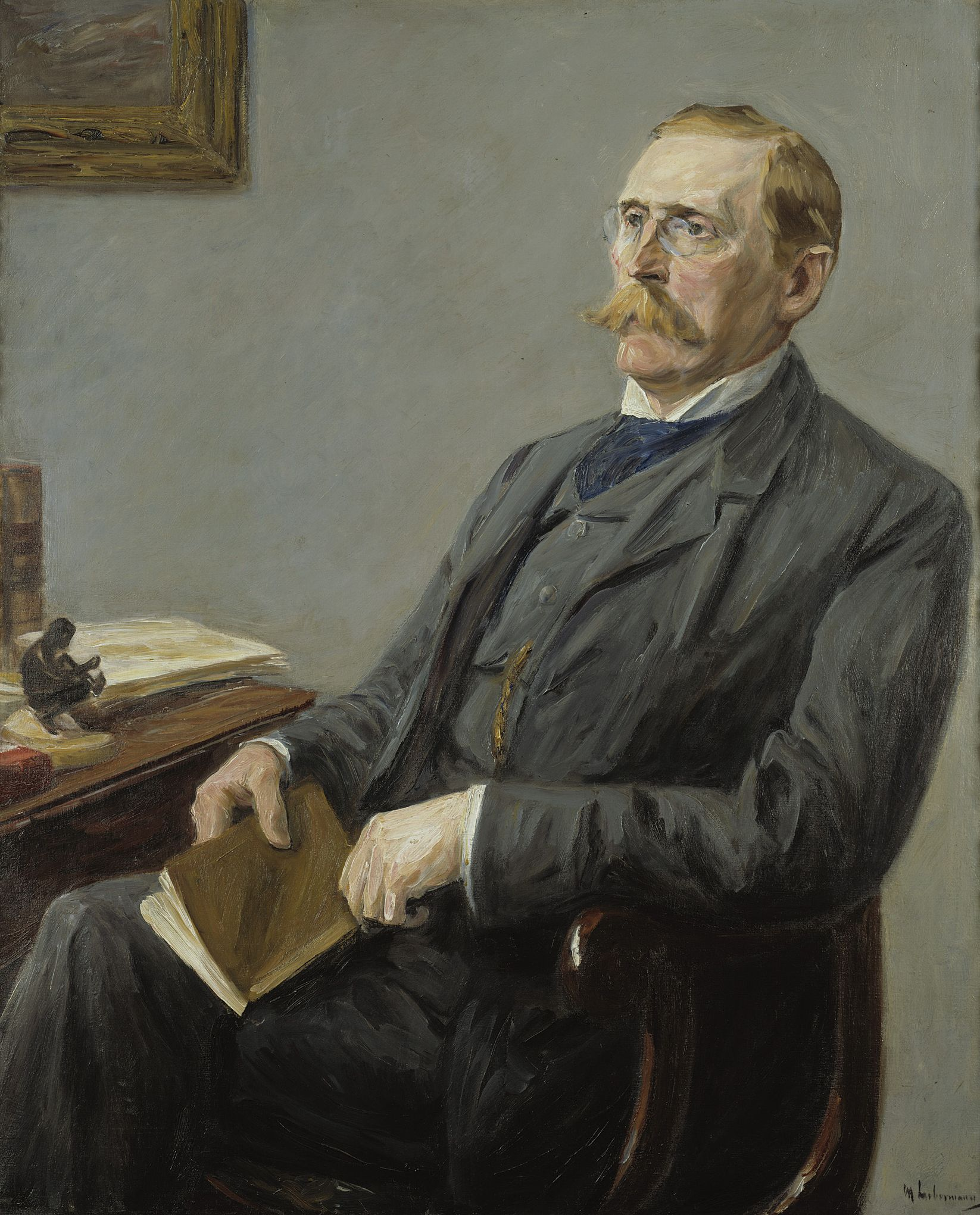
Wilhelm von Bode painted by Max Liebermann (1904, in Alte Nationalgalerie, Berlin)

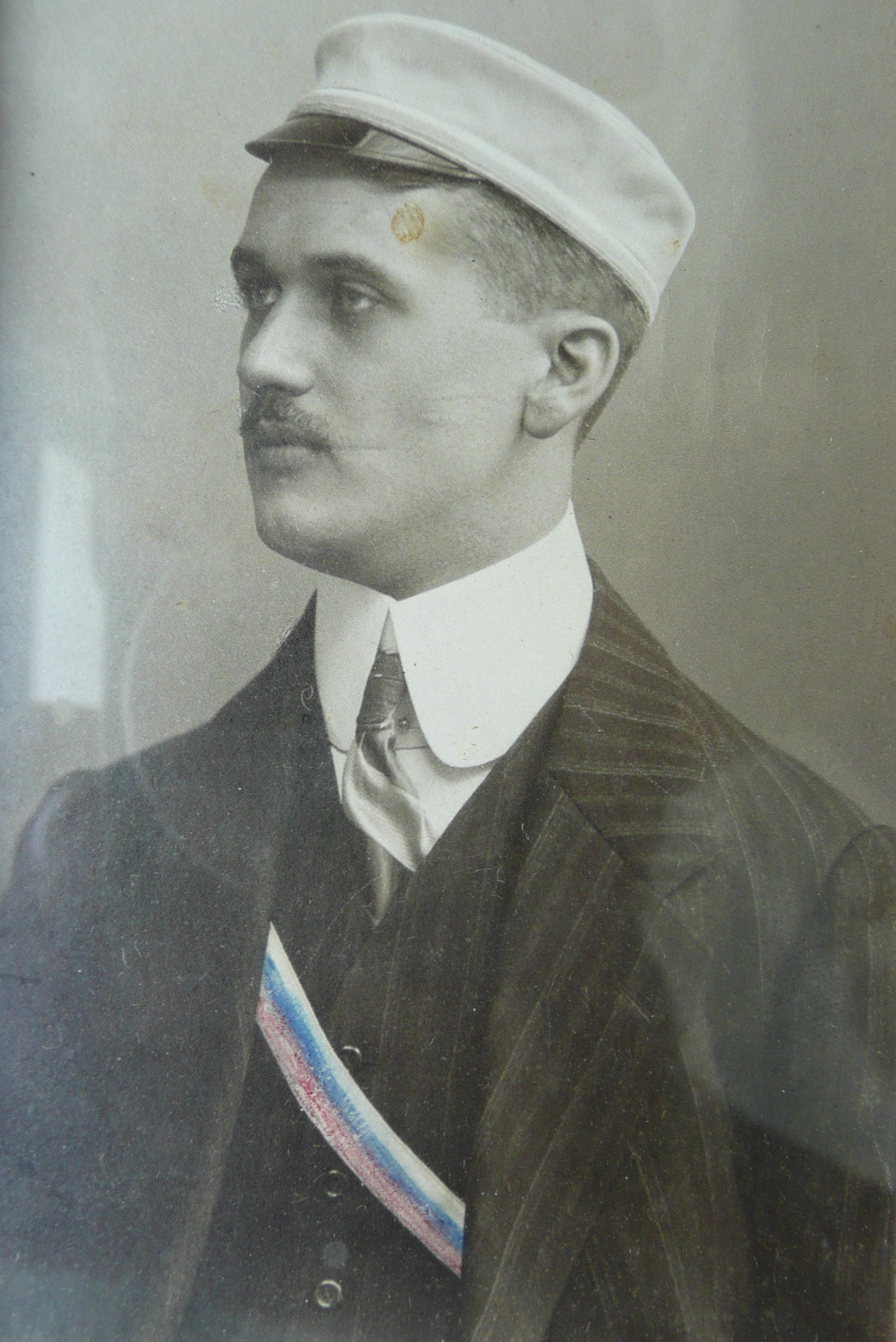
Caesar Rudolf Boettger

- Eduard Bacher (1846–1908), Austrian jurisconsult and journalist
- Hermann von Barth (1845–1876), mountaineer; Corps Franconia München
- Adolf Tortilowicz von Batocki-Friebe (1868–1944), member of the Prussian House of Lords, Corps Borussia Bonn
- Walter Bauer (1877–1960), theologist, a scholar of the development of the early Christian churches; Corps Hasso-Nassovia Marburg
- Rudolf Baumbach (1840–1905), poet; Corps Thuringia Jena
- Paul Bäumer (1896–1927), German ace in World War I; Corps Suevo-Borussia Berlin
- Friedrich Bayer (1825–1880), founder of Bayer, Corps Saxonia Bonn
- Hans Hermann Behr (1818–1904), German-American physician, botanist, entomologist; Corps Marchia Halle, Corps Moenania Würzburg
- Emil Adolf von Behring (1854–1917), German physiologist, first Nobel Prize in Physiology or Medicine (1907); Corps Suevo-Borussia Berlin
- Rudolf von Bennigsen (1824–1902), politician and leader of the National Liberals; Corps Hannovera Göttingen, Corps Vandalia Heidelberg
- Friedrich von Berg (1866–1939), last chairman of the Secret Civil Cabinet of Kaiser Wilhelm II, grave-digger of the German monarchy; Corps Borussia Bonn
- Gustav Adolf Bergenroth (1813–1869), historian (Tudors, Spain); Corps Masovia Königsberg
- Julius Bergmann (1840–1904), philosopher, Corps Teutonia-Hercynia Göttingen
- Wilhelm Berning (1877–1955), German Roman Catholic bishop of Osnabrück; Corps Germania Münster
- Otto Julius Bierbaum (1865–1910), writer; Corps Thuringia Leipzig
- Julius Binder (1870–1939), philosopher; Corps Bavaria Würzburg
- Otto Binswanger (1852–1929), Swiss psychiatrist and neurologist; Corps Suevia Heidelberg, Corps Tigurinia Zürich
- Carl-Heinz Birnbacher (1910–1991), Knight's Cross of the Iron Cross, Konteradmiral of the Bundesmarine; Corps Schacht Leoben
- Herbert von Bismarck (1849–1904), Minister for Foreign Affairs; Corps Borussia Bonn
- Otto von Bismarck (1815–1898), Chancellor of the German Empire; Corps Hannovera Göttingen
- Hinrich Bitter-Suermann (b. 1940), German-Canadian Professor of Surgery (organ transplantation); Corps Nassovia Würzburg, Corps Hannovera Göttingen
- Heinrich Blochmann (1838–1878), iranist in Kolkata; Corps Lusatia Leipzig
- Erich Bloedorn (1902–1975), Colonel and bomber pilot in WW 2, Knight's Cross of the Iron Cross; Corps Masovia Königsberg
- Johannes Blume (d. 1892), Brevet Brigadier General 32nd Regiment Indiana Infantry; Corps Saxonia Bonn, Corps Hannovera Göttingen
- Wilhelm von Bode (1845–1929), German art historian and museum director, founder of Bode Museum; Corps Brunsviga Göttingen
- Ernst von Bodelschwingh-Velmede (1794–1854), Prussian politician, Corps Guestphalia Göttingen
- Karl von Bodelschwingh-Velmede (1800–1873), Prussian politician; Corps Guestphalia Göttingen
- Eduard Böcking (1802–1870), legal scholar; Corps Hassia Heidelberg (suspended)
- Franz Böhm (1895–1977), politician, lawyer, and economist; Corps Rhenania Freiburg
- Heinrich Böhmcker (1896–1944), lawyer, SA general and Mayor of Bremen; Corps Brunsviga Göttingen and Suevia Straßburg
- Caesar Rudolf Boettger (1888–1976), German zoologist, Corps Guestphalia Bonn, Corps Silesia Breslau
- Karl Heinrich von Boetticher (1833–1907), Secretary of the Interior (1880–1897), and Vice Chancellor of Germany (1881–1897); Corps Nassovia Würzburg
- Ernst Bolbrinker (1898–1962), mining engineer, Generalmajor, Knight's Cross of the Iron Cross, Afrikakorps; Corps Schacht Leoben
- Otto Bollinger (1843–1909), pathologist (fowlpox); Corps Suevia München
- Robert Bonnet (1851–1921), anatomist; Corps Suevia München, Corps Brunsviga Göttingen
- Otto Bovensiepen (1905–1979), lawyer and Gestapo official; Corps Frankonia Bonn
- Franz Bracht (1877–1933), politician; Corps Rhenania Würzburg
- Curt Bräuer (1889–1969), diplomat, Corps Lusatia Breslau, Corps Guestfalia Greifswald
- Friedrich Gustav von Bramann (1854–1913), surgeon (tracheostomy on Crown Prince Friedrich Wilhelm; Corps Hansea Königsberg
- Ernst Brandes (1862–1935), German lawyer, estate manager and politician; Corps Lusatia Leipzig
- Karl Ferdinand Braun (1850–1918), physicist, Nobel laureate in physics 1909 (with Guglielmo Marconi); Corps Teutonia Marburg
- Magnus von Braun (senior) (1878–1972), jurist and politician; Corps Saxonia Göttingen
- Alfred Brehm (1829–1884), zoologist, Brehms Tierleben; Corps Saxonia Jena
- Eberhard von Breitenbuch (1910–1980), cavalry officer in the German resistance; Corps Silvania Tharandt
- Lorenzo Brentano (1813–1891), German journalist, member of the Frankfurt Assembly and U.S. Representative from Illinois; Corps Allemannia Heidelberg
- Alois von Brinz (1820–1887), jurist and politician; Corps Suevia München, Corps Franconia Prag
- Wilhelm Brückner (1884–1954), until 1940 Adolf Hitler's chief adjutant; Corps Transrhenania München
- Heinrich Brunn (1822–1894), archaeologist, Corps Palatia Bonn
- Bernhard Ernst von Bülow (1815–1879), state secretary; Corps Vandalia Göttingen
- Heinrich von Bülow (1792–1846), prussian statesman; Corps Vandalia Heidelberg
- Walter von Bülow-Bothkamp (1894–1918), German World War I ace; Corps Vandalia Heidelberg

== C ==
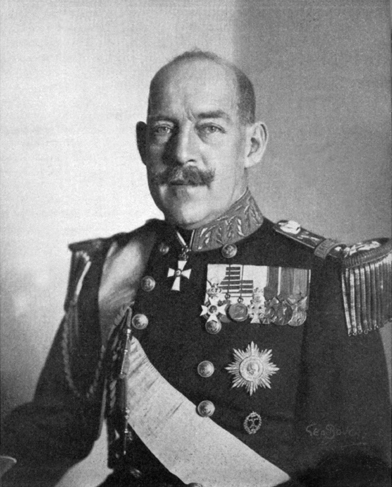
King of Greece Constantin I.

- Petre P. Carp (1837–1919), Prime Minister of Romania; Corps Borussia Bonn
- Charles Augustus, Hereditary Grand Duke of Saxe-Weimar-Eisenach, Corps Saxo-Borussia Heidelberg
- Charles Edward, Duke of Saxe-Coburg and Gotha (1884–1958), last reigning Duke of Saxe-Coburg and Gotha; Corps Borussia Bonn
- Maximilian Joseph von Chelius (1794–1876), surgeon and ophthalmologist; Corps Suevia Heidelberg
- Adolf Karl Ludwig Claus (1838–1900), chemist, known for his structure of benzene proposed in 1867; Corps Teutonia Marburg
- Carl Friedrich Wilhelm Claus, Corps Hasso-Nassovia Marburg
- Bruno Claußen, State Secretary, Prussian Ministry of Economics and Labor, Corps Franconia Tübingen
- Julius Friedrich Cohnheim (1839–1884), pathologist; Corps Nassovia Würzburg
- Gerhard Conrad (pilot) (1895–1982), Generalleutnant of the Luftwaffe; Corps Hercynia München, Corps Frankonia Brünn
- Constantine I of Greece (1868–1923), King of the Hellenes, Duke of Sparta; Corps Saxo-Borussia Heidelberg
- Alexander Conze (1831–1914), archaeologist, secretary of the German Archaeological Institute; Corps Brunsviga Göttingen
- Wilhelm Paul Corssen (1820–1875), philologist; Corps Marchia Berlin
- Carl Hermann Credner (1841–1913), German earth scientist
- Vincenz Czerny (1842–1916), surgeon; Corps Austria Frankfurt

== D ==
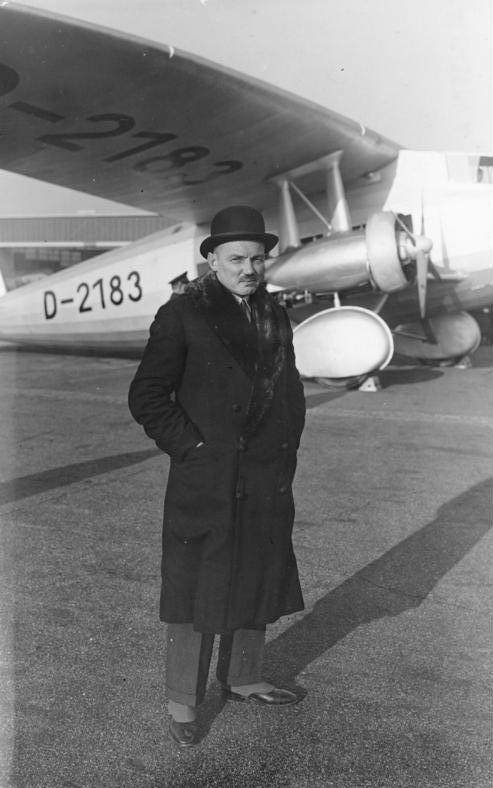
Claude Dornier 1931 in front of a Dornier Do K-3

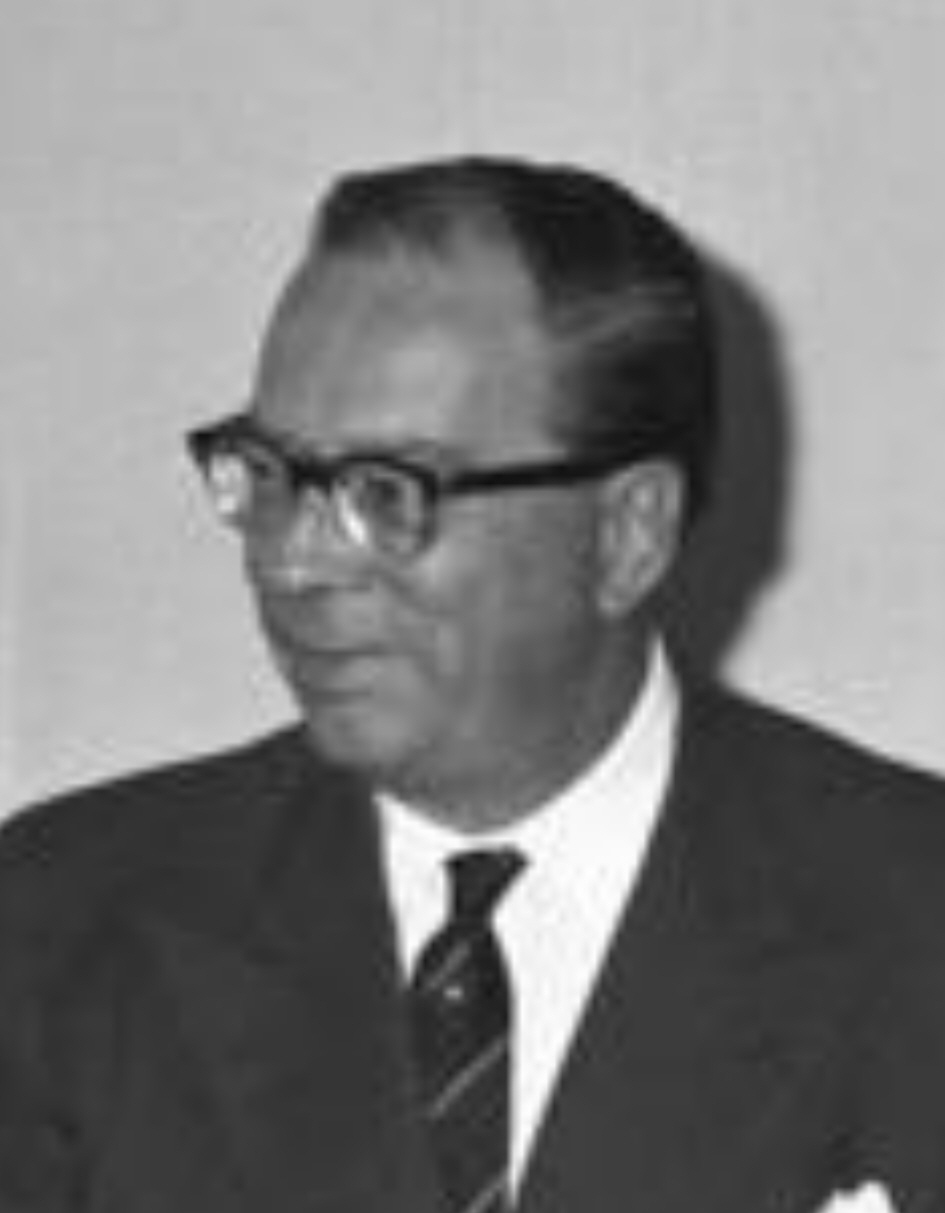
Rescuer of 7,000 Jews in the Holocaust Georg Ferdinand Duckwitz

- Gottlieb Daimler (1834–1900), pioneer of internal-combustion engines and automobile development; Corps Stauffia Stuttgart
- Werner Dankwort (1895–1986), diplomat bringing Germany into the League of Nations in 1926 prior to representing the German contingent in the Organisation for European Economic Co-operation, the post-World War II effort known as the Marshall Plan, Corps Vandalia-Teutonia Berlin
- Siegfried Dehn (1799–1858), music theorist, editor, teacher and librarian; Corps Saxonia Leipzig
- Max Delbrück (1850–1919), German agricultural chemist; Corps Cimbria Berlin
- Ernst von Delius (1912–1937), racing car driver; Corps Franconia München
- Nicolaus Delius (1813–1888), philologist; Corps Guestphalia Bonn
- Georg Diederichs (1900–1983), politician (SPD), Prime Minister of Lower Saxony; Corps Teutonia-Hercynia Göttingen
- Johann Friedrich Dieffenbach (1792–1847), plastic surgeon, Corps Pomerania Greifswald
- Rudolf Diels (1900–1957), SS-Oberführer, in charge of the Gestapo from 1933 to 1934; Corps Rhenania Straßburg
- Arnold Diestel (1857–1924), First Mayor of Hamburg; Corps Hasso-Borussia Freiburg
- Franz von Dingelstedt (1814–1881), poet, dramatist and theatre administrator; Corps Schaumburgia Marburg
- Herbert von Dirksen (1882–1955), ambassador to Britain; Corps Saxo-Borussia Heidelberg
- Rudolf Doehn (1821–1895), Forty-Eighter, fought in the Union Army; Corps Guestphalia Halle
- Hermann Dohna-Finckenstein (1894–1942), German estate owner, politician and SS officer; Corps Borussia Bonn
- Claudius Dornier (1884–1969), founder of Dornier GmbH; Corps Suevo-Guestphalia München
- Ludwig Draxler (1896–1972), Austrian Secretary of Finance; Corps Rhaetia Innsbruck
- Julius Dreschfeld (1845–1907), leading British physician and pathologist; Corps Franconia Würzburg
- Jakob Dubs (1822–1879), member of the Swiss Federal Council; Corps Helevetia Heidelberg (suspended)
- Georg Ferdinand Duckwitz (1904–1973), ambassador to Denmark, Righteous among the Nations; Corps Rhenania Freiburg

== E ==
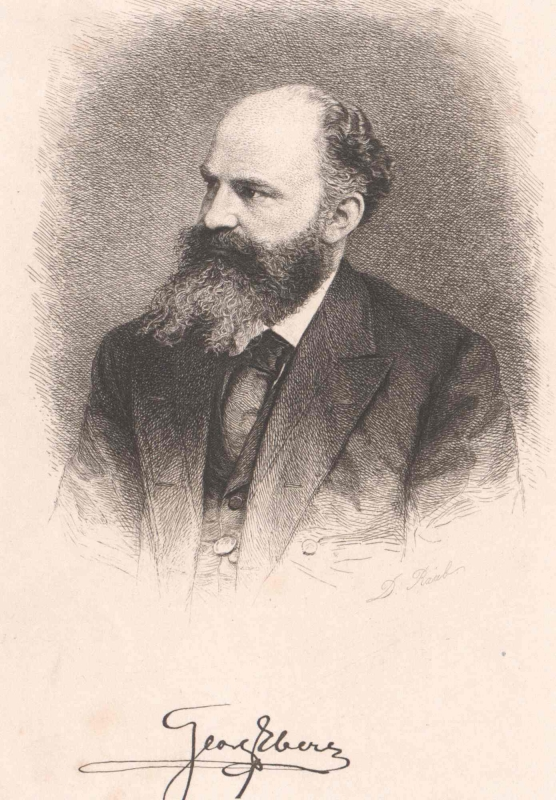
Georg Ebers, egyptologist

- Hermann Ebbinghaus (1850–1909), psychologist; Corps Guestphalia Bonn
- Georg Ebers (1837–1898), egyptologist and novelist, discovered the Ebers Papyrus; Corps Saxonia Göttingen
- Victor von Ebner (1842–1925), Austrian anatomist and histologist; Corps Rhaetia Innsbruck
- Walter Eckhardt (1906–1994), member of the Bundestag and Member of the European Parliament; Corps Teutonia Marburg
- Marc S. Ellenbogen, US Presidential Advisor, diplomat and philanthropist; Corps Rheno-Nicaria zu Mannheim und Heidelberg
- Wilhelm Endemann (1825–1899), legal scholar, member of the Reichstag; Corps Teutonia Marburg
- Johann Georg Veit Engelhardt (1791–1855), theologian; Corps Franconia II Erlangen
- Friedrich Erismann, (1842–1915), Swiss ophthalmologist and hygienist; Corps Tigurinia Zürich
- Ernst II, Prince of Hohenlohe-Langenburg (1863–1950), Corps Suevia Tübingen, Corps Borussia Bonn
- Ernst I, Duke of Saxe-Altenburg (1826–1908), Corps Franconia Jena, Corps Saxo-Borussia Heidelberg
- Ernst II, Duke of Saxe-Altenburg (1871–1955), Corps Franconia Jena
- Walter Eucken, protagonist of the social market economy; Corps Saxonia Kiel
- Botho zu Eulenburg (1831–1912), Prussian prime minister (1892–1894)
- Hanns Heinz Ewers (1871–1943), actor and writer; Corps Normannia Berlin, Corps Alemannia Wien

== F ==
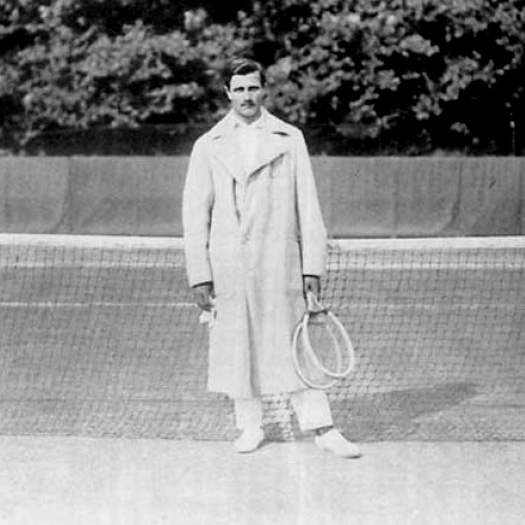
Olympic tennis champ Otto Froitzheim

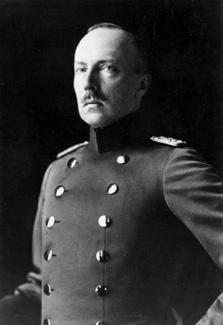
Prince Frederick Charles of Hesse (1868–1940), King of Finland

- Paul Falkenberg (1848–1925), botanist; Corps Hildesia IV Göttingen
- Oskar Farny (1891–1983), businessman and politician; AV Guestfalia Tübingen
- Gottfried Feder (1883–1941), economist, one of the early key members of the Nazi party; Corps Isaria München
- Max Fesca (1846–1917), agricultural scientist, hired by the Meiji government of Japan as a foreign advisor from 1882 to 1894; Corps Teutonia-Hercynia Göttingen
- Carl Flügge (1847–1923), bacteriologist and hygienist; Corps Bremensia Göttingen
- Max von Forckenbeck (1821–1891), politician, founder of the German Progress Party and National Liberal Party, Berlin mayor, Reichstag president; Corps Teutonia Giessen
- Gustav Freytag (1816–1895), dramatist and novelist, Pour le Mérite; Corps Borussia Breslau
- Frederick II, Grand Duke of Baden (1857–1928), Corps Saxo-Borussia Heidelberg, Corps Borussia Bonn, Corps Suevia Heidelberg
- Prince Frederick Charles of Hesse (1868–1940), King of Finland; Corps Suevia Freiburg
- Frederick Francis IV, Grand Duke of Mecklenburg (1882–1945); Corps Borussia Bonn, Corps Visigothia Rostock
- Wilhelm von Freeden (1822–1894), mathematician, navigation lecturer, founder of the North German Naval Observatory; Corps Guestphalia Bonn, Corps Frisia Göttingen
- Karl Rudolf Friedenthal, Prussian statesman; Corps Silesia Breslau
- Nikolaus Friedreich, pathologist and neurologist; Corps Rhenania Würzburg
- Friedrich, Prince of Waldeck and Pyrmont, Corps Bremensia Göttingen
- Richard Frommel, Corps Suevia München, Corps Brunsviga Göttingen, Corps Rhenania Würzburg
- August von Froriep, Corps Saxonia Göttingen
- Otto Froitzheim (1884–1962), tennis champion; Corps Teutonia Bonn
- Karl Fürstner, neurologist and psychiatrist; Corps Nassovia Würzburg

== G ==
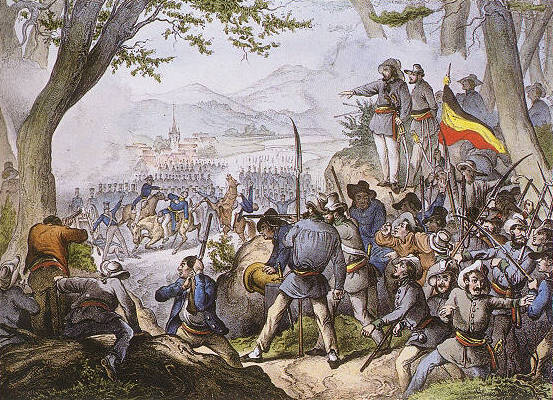
Death of General Friedrich von Gagern in the Battle at Kandern, which ended the Hecker Uprising. The print shows the battle from the perspective of the Revolutionaries.

- Georg von der Gabelentz, linguist, sinologist; Corps Franconia Jena
- Friedrich Balduin von Gagern (1794–1848), German general, Corps Hannovera Göttingen
- Albert Ganzenmüller, State Secretary, Reich Ministry of Transportation, Corps Rheno-Palatia München
- Wilhelm von Gayl, Secretary of Interior; Corps Saxonia Göttingen, Corps Borussia Bonn
- Karl Geiler, Prime Minister of Hessen; Corps Rhenania Freiburg
- Heinrich Gelzer, classical scholar; Corps Alamannia Basel
- Kurt Gerstein (1905–1945), German SS officer, tried to inform the international public about the Holocaust, author of the Gerstein Report, Corps Teutonia Marburg
- Robert Gersuny (1844–1924), Austrian surgeon
- Gustaw Gizewiusz, pastor in Mazovia; Corps Masovia Königsberg
- Themistocles Gluck, surgeon, inaugurator of joint replacement; Corps Saxonia Leipzig
- Heinrich Ernst Göring, colonial governor of German South-West Africa, father of Hermann Göring; Corps Saxonia Bonn
- August Görtz, civil servant and politician; Corps Hannovera Göttingen.
- Eugen Freiherr von Gorup-Besanez, chemist; Corps Bavaria München
- Gustav Graef, painter; Corpslandsmannschaft Normannia Königsberg
- Hans Grässel, architect, Pour le Mérite; Corps Rheno-Palatia München
- Ferdinand Gregorovius, journalist and historian, honorary citizen of Rome; Corps Masovia Königsberg
- Erich Gritzbach, Chief of the Staff Office, Prussian State Ministry, Berlin Burschenschaft Gothia
- Paul Güssfeldt, geologist, mountaineer and explorer, Corps Vandalia Heidelberg

== H ==
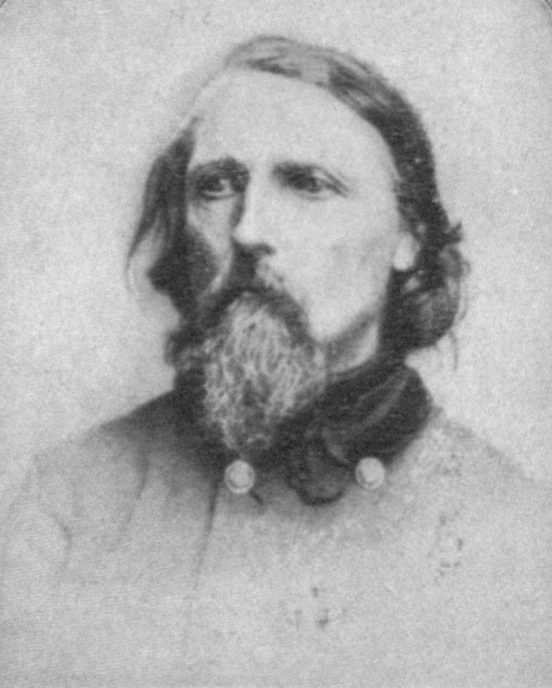
Brigade commander in the Union Army Friedrich Hecker

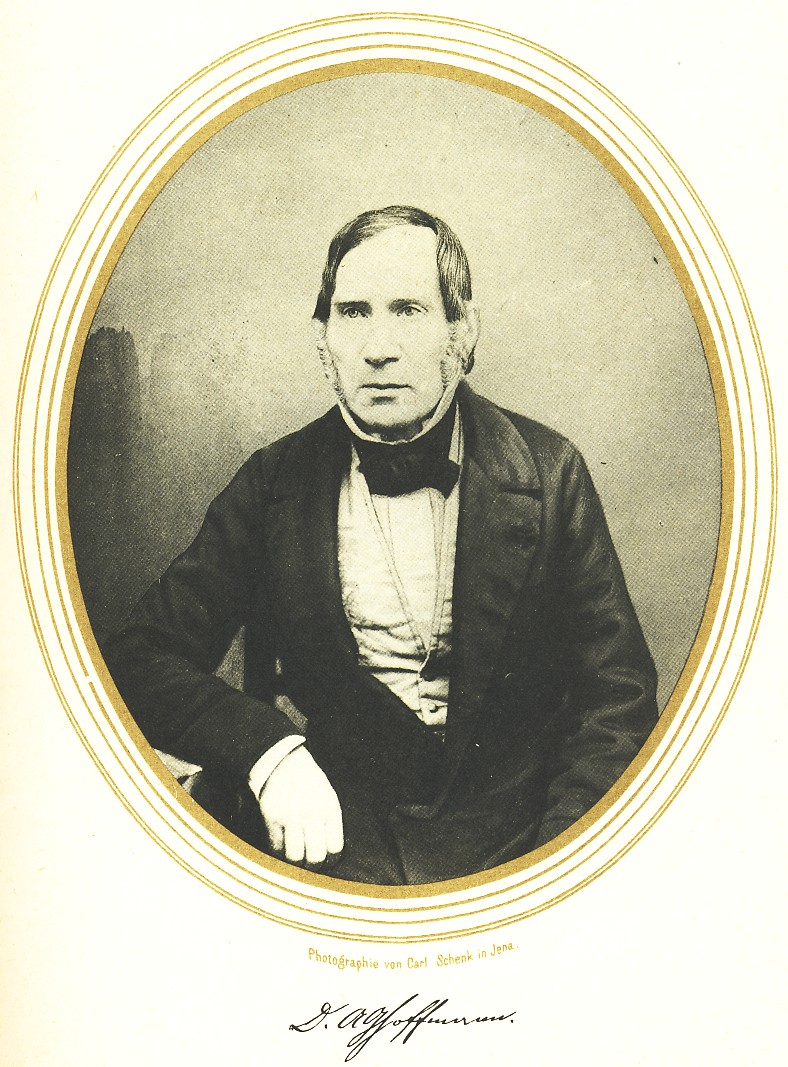
Andreas Gottlieb Hoffmann, 1858.

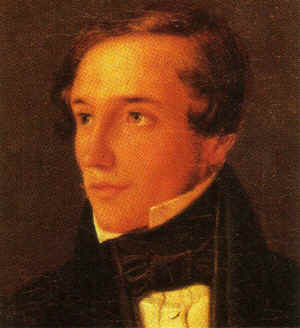
Heinrich Hoffmann

- Klaus Hänsch
- Albrecht von Hagen, Wehrmacht officer, German resistance, executed; Corps Saxo-Borussia Heidelberg.
- Carl von Halfern, Oberpräsident of Province of Pomerania, Corps Rhenania Strassburg
- Werner Hartenstein, commander of German submarine U-156, Knight's cross of the Iron Cross; Corps Hasso-Borussia Freiburg
- Emil Hartwich, Corps Rhenania Heidelberg
- Ulrich von Hassell, diplomat, German resistance, executed; Corps Suevia Tübingen
- Hermann von Hatzfeldt, Corps Saxonia Göttingen
- Friedrich Hecker, Corps Rhenania Heidelberg, Corps Hassia Heidelberg, Corps Palatia Heidelberg
- Justus Hecker, founder of historical pathology, Corps Marchia Berlin
- Johann Gustav Heckscher, minister resident; Corps Guestphalia Heidelberg
- Heinrich Heine (1797–1856), significant German poet of the 19th century, Corps Guestphalia Göttingen
- Karl Heinzen (1809–1880), revolutionary author; Corps Guestphalia Bonn
- Vollrath von Hellermann, Generalmajor of the Wehrmacht, Knight's Cross of the Iron Cross; Corps Saxonia Göttingen
- Wilhelm Hemprich, naturalist and explorer; Corps Teutonia Breslau, Corps Borussia Breslau
- Paul Hensel, pastor, defender of Mazovia; Corps Masovia
- Rudolph Hering, American engineer, Corps Altsachsen Dresden
- Alfred Herrhausen
- Jürgen Herrlein
- Wilhelm Hertz, rediscovered writer; Corps Teutonia Stuttgart, Corps Franconia Tübingen
- Walther Herwig (1838–1912), Prussian administrative lawyer, and the founder of the German fisheries science, Corps Hannovera Göttingen
- Otto Hesse, mathematician; Corps Masovia Königsberg.
- Hermann Theodor Hettner, literary historian; Corps Silesia Berlin, Corps Saxo-Borussia Heidelberg
- Prince Frederick Charles of Hesse
- Carl von Heyden, Corps Rhenania Heidelberg
- William Hillebrand, founder of the Hawaii Medical Association and Foster Botanical Garden in Honolulu; Corps Hanseatia Göttingen und Corps Saxo-Borussia Heidelberg
- Paul von Hindenburg, Generalfeldmarschall, Reichspräsident; Corps Montania Freiberg
- Hans Hinkel, official in the Reich Chamber of Culture and Ministry of Propaganda, Corps Sugambria Bonn
- Eduard Hitzig, neuropsychiatrist, Corps Nassovia Würzburg, Corps Neoborussia Berlin
- Paul Hocheisen (1870–1944), military surgeon, SA general and German Red Cross official, Corps Suevo-Borussia und Saxonia
- Leopold von Hoesch, diplomat; Corps Saxo-Borussia Heidelberg
- Andreas Gottlieb Hoffmann, theologian and orientalist; Corps Teutonia Halle
- Heinrich Hoffmann, psychiatrist, author of Struwwelpeter; Corps Allemannia Heidelberg
- Anton Friedrich Hohl, obstetrician; Corps Thuringia Leipzig, founder of Corps Saxonia Leipzig
- Kurt von Holleben, chemist and photographer (1894-1947); Corps Vandalia Heidelberg
- Karl Christian Johann Holsten, theologian; Corps Misnia Leipzig, Corps Vandalia Rostock
- Joachim Wilhelm Franz Philipp von Holtzendorff, jurist
- Caspar Alexander Honthumb, contributing editor New Yorker Staats-Zeitung, Cincinnati Volksfreund, Puck, Corps Hannovera Göttingen
- Johann Friedrich Horner (1831–1886), Swiss ophthalmologist, Corps Tigurinia Zürich

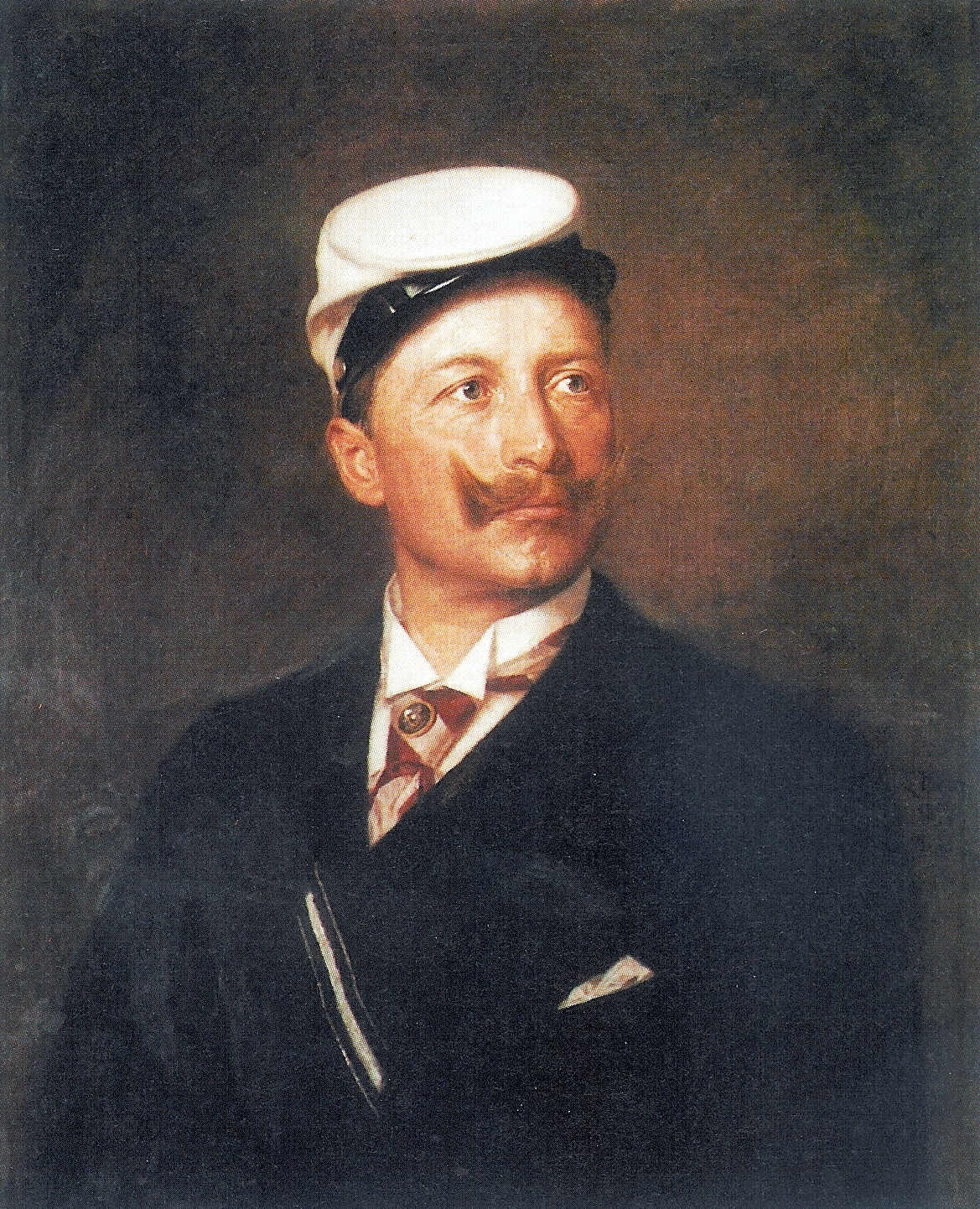
German Emperor Wilhelm II.

- House of Hohenzollern
  - Prince Eitel Friedrich of Prussia (1883–1942), Prussian prince and general; Corps Borussia Bonn
  - Prince Friedrich Karl of Prussia, Corps Borussia Bonn
  - Prince Henry of Prussia, brother of Wilhelm II, Großadmiral; Corps Holsatia Kiel
  - Prince Oskar of Prussia, Generalmajor, Herrenmeister of the Johanniterorden; Corps Borussia Bonn, Corps Saxo-Borussia Heidelberg
  - Prince Sigismund of Prussia, Corps Brandenburgia Berlin (Cleveland)
  - Wilhelm II, German Emperor, Corps Borussia Bonn
  - William, German Crown Prince, Corps Borussia Bonn
  - Prince Waldemar of Prussia (1889–1945); Corps Holsatia Kiel
  - Prince Wilhelm of Prussia, Corps Borussia Bonn
- Francis Huebschmann (German: Franz Hübschmann), 1817–1880), 1851–1852 and 1871–1872 senator in Wisconsin, "best physician" of the Union Army; Corps Saxonia Jena
- Ferdinand Hueppe, bacteriologist, military surgeon, first German Football Association president; Corps Alemannia Berlin
- Carl Hueter, surgeon, member of the Reichstag; Corps Teutonia Marburg

== J ==
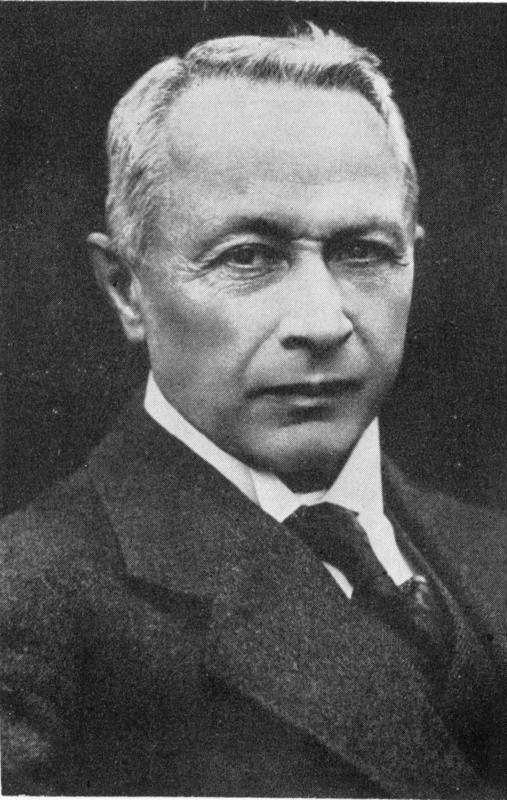
Hugo Junkers

- Hermann Jacobi (1850–1937), indologist, Corps Teutonia Bonn
- August Jäger (1887–1949), lawyer and Nazi official; Corps Suevia Munich
- Otto Jaekel, paleontologist, geologist; Corps Lusatia Breslau, Corps Guestfalia Greifswald
- Duke John Albert of Mecklenburg
- Philipp von Jolly, physicist, mathematician; Corps Hassia Heidelberg
- Carl Friedrich Wilhelm Jordan, writer and politician; Corps Littuania.
- Heinz Jost, SS Brigadeführer; Corps Hassia Gießen
- Hugo Junkers (1859–1935), innovative engineer (gas engines, aeroplanes), Corps Delta Aachen

== K ==
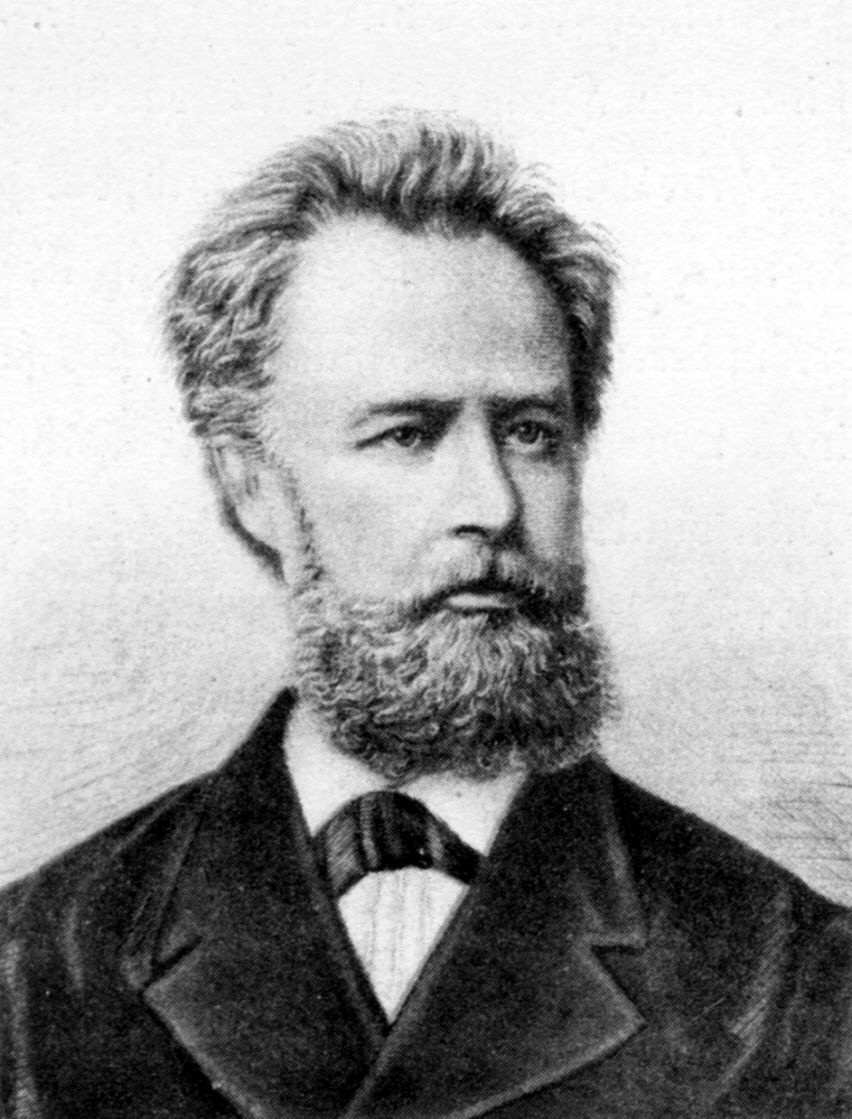
Friedrich Kapp

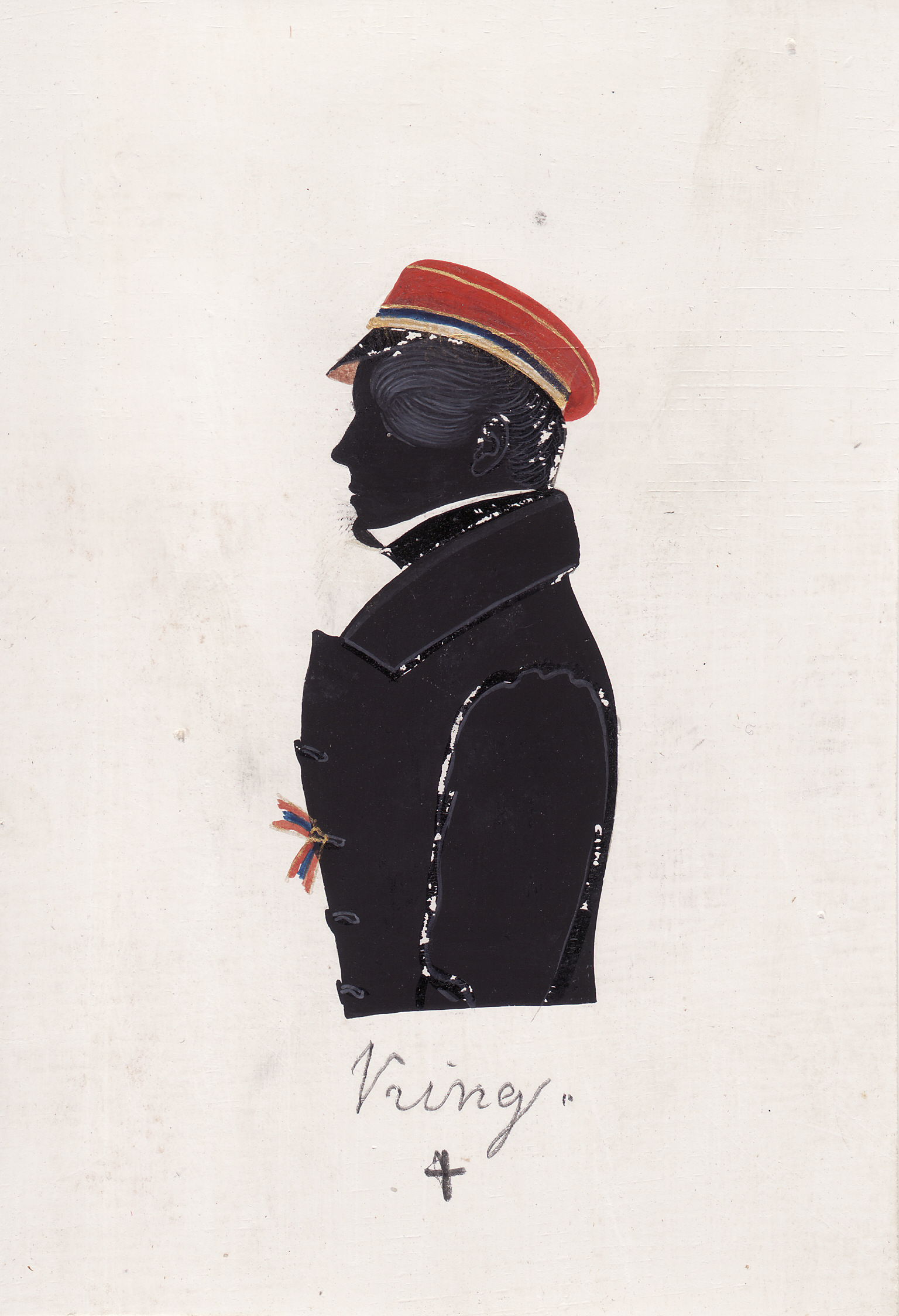
Silhouette portrait of Mitchell Campbell King (1832/33 in Göttingen wearing the Hanoverian colours and student cap)

- Karl Kaiser (b. 1934), Harvard professor, co-worker of Henry Kissinger; Corps Hansea Köln
- Manfred Kanther
- Friedrich Kapp, Corps Suevia Heidelberg
- Wolfgang Kapp (1858–1922), nominal leader of the so-called Kapp Putsch, Corps Hannovera Göttingen
- Gustav Kastner-Kirdorf (1881–1945), German Luftwaffe general, Hevellia Berlin.
- Walther Kausch, surgeon, pioneer of pancreaticoduodenectomy; Corps Palaio-Alsatia Straßburg
- Albert Keller, German painter, Corps Isaria München
- Ott-Heinrich Keller (1906–1990), German mathematician; Corps Austria
- Wilhelm Emmanuel Freiherr von Ketteler
- Emil Ketterer (1883–1959), Olympic sprinter, physician and SA general; Münchener Burschenschaft Arminia-Rhenania
- Wilhelm Kiesselbach, ENT surgeon; Corps Hildeso-Guestphalia Göttingen, Corps Hasso-Nassovia Marburg
- Mitchell Campbell King (1815–1901), American planter and physician in the Carolinas, Corps Hannovera Göttingen
- Georg Kloss (1787–1854), German historian of freemasonry, Corps Hannovera Göttingen
- William August Kobbé, United States Army officer; Corps Franconia Freiberg
- Wolfgang Franz von Kobell, mineralogist, writer in Bavarian dialect; Corps Isaria München Corps
- Hans Koch, jurist, officer in both World Wars, member of the German resistance, executed; Corps Baltia Königsberg
- Eberhard von Koerber, past CEO of ABB Group, co-president of the Club of Rome; Corps Saxo-Borussia Heidelberg
- Erwin Guido Kolbenheyer (1878–1962), Austrian novelist, poet and playwright; Corps Symposion Wien
- Franz König, Corps Teutonia Marburg.
- Theodor Körner, German poet and soldier
- Werner Körte (1853–1937), German surgeon; Corps Teutonia Bonn
- Ludwig Kohl-Larsen, anthropologist, explorer
- Herbert Kraus, Corps Saxonia Göttingen
- Johannes Krohn, State Secretary, Reich Ministry of Labor, Leipziger Burschenschaft Germania
- Adalbert Krüger, Corps Marchia Berlin
- Jacob Kuechler (1823–1893), he pioneered the science of Dendrochronology to date natural events, Corps Starkenburgia Gießen.
- Hermann Kümmell, Corps Nassovia Würzburg
- Eberhard von Kuenheim (b. 1928), German industrial manager, long time CEO BMW-Group, Corps Teutonia Stuttgart
- Otto Küstner, Corps Lusatia Leipzig
- Hermann Kuhnt, ophthalmologist
- Adolph Kussmaul (1822–1902), German physician and a leading clinician of his time, Corps Suevia Heidelberg
- Wilhelm Kutscher (1876–1962), German lawyer and politician; Corps Suevia Tübingen

== L ==
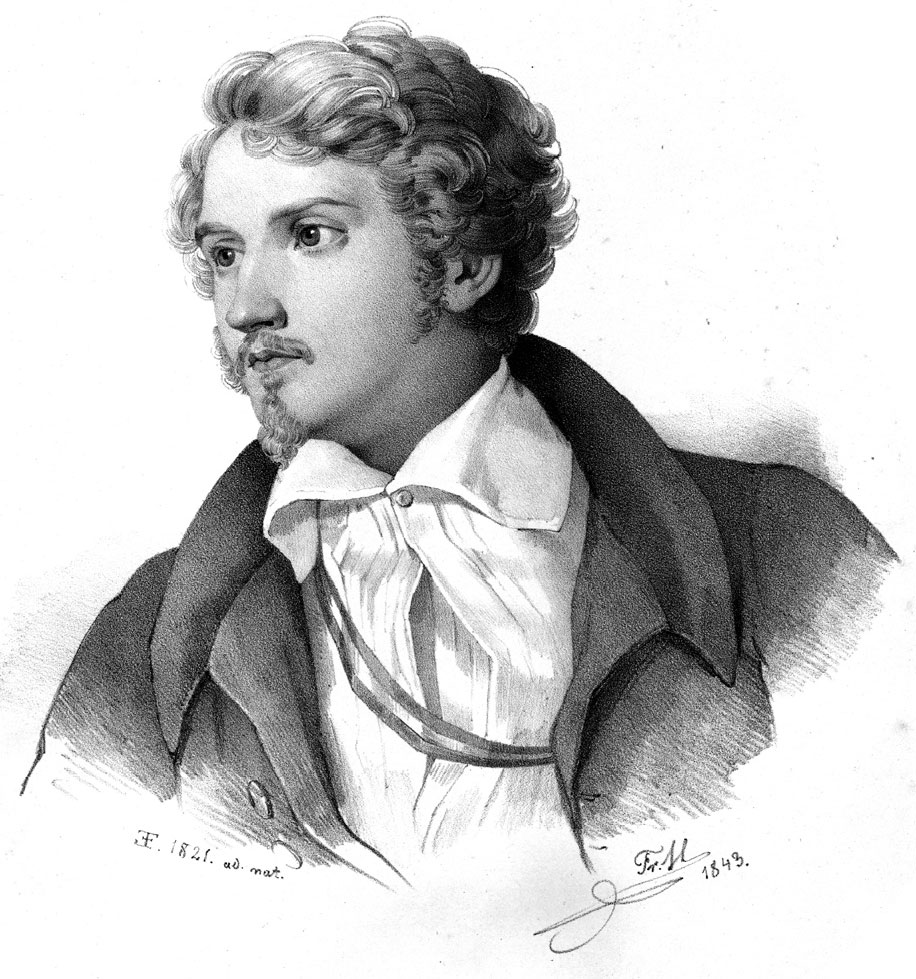
The young Liebig: 1843 lithograph after an 1821 painting (Liebighaus)

- Friedrich Landfried, State Secretary, Prussian Ministry of Finance and Reich Ministry of Economics, Corps Rhenania Strassburg
- Hans Heinrich Landolt, Swiss chemist
- Bernhard von Langenbeck, surgeon
- Arnold von Lasaulx, mineralogist and petrographer
- Eduard Schmidt von der Launitz (1796–1869), German sculptor, Corps Curonia Göttingen
- Robert Lehr, Corps Teutonia Marburg
- Helmut Lemke
- Max Lenz, historian
- Heinrich Leo, Prussian historian and politician
- Ernst Levy von Halle, Jewish propaganda chief of Alfred von Tirpitz
- Wilhelm Liebknecht
- Justus von Liebig (1803–1873), German chemist and Gießen University faculty, Corps Rhenania Erlangen I (suspended ...)
- Franz Joseph II, Prince of Liechtenstein
- Joseph von Lindwurm, physician and dermatologist, Corps Bavaria Würzburg
- Hermann Lingg, poet
- Rudolf Lipschitz, mathematician
- Friedrich Loeffler
- Carl Ludwig, Corps Hasso-Nassovia Marburg
- Georg Albert Lücke, surgeon

== M ==
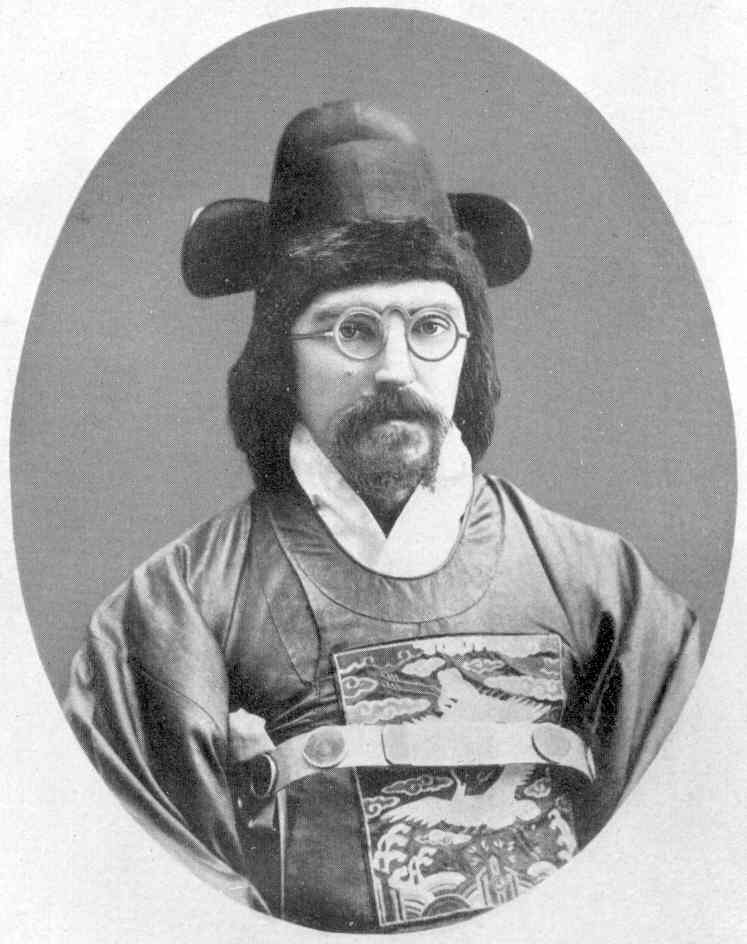
Sinologist Möllendorff in official Korean dress

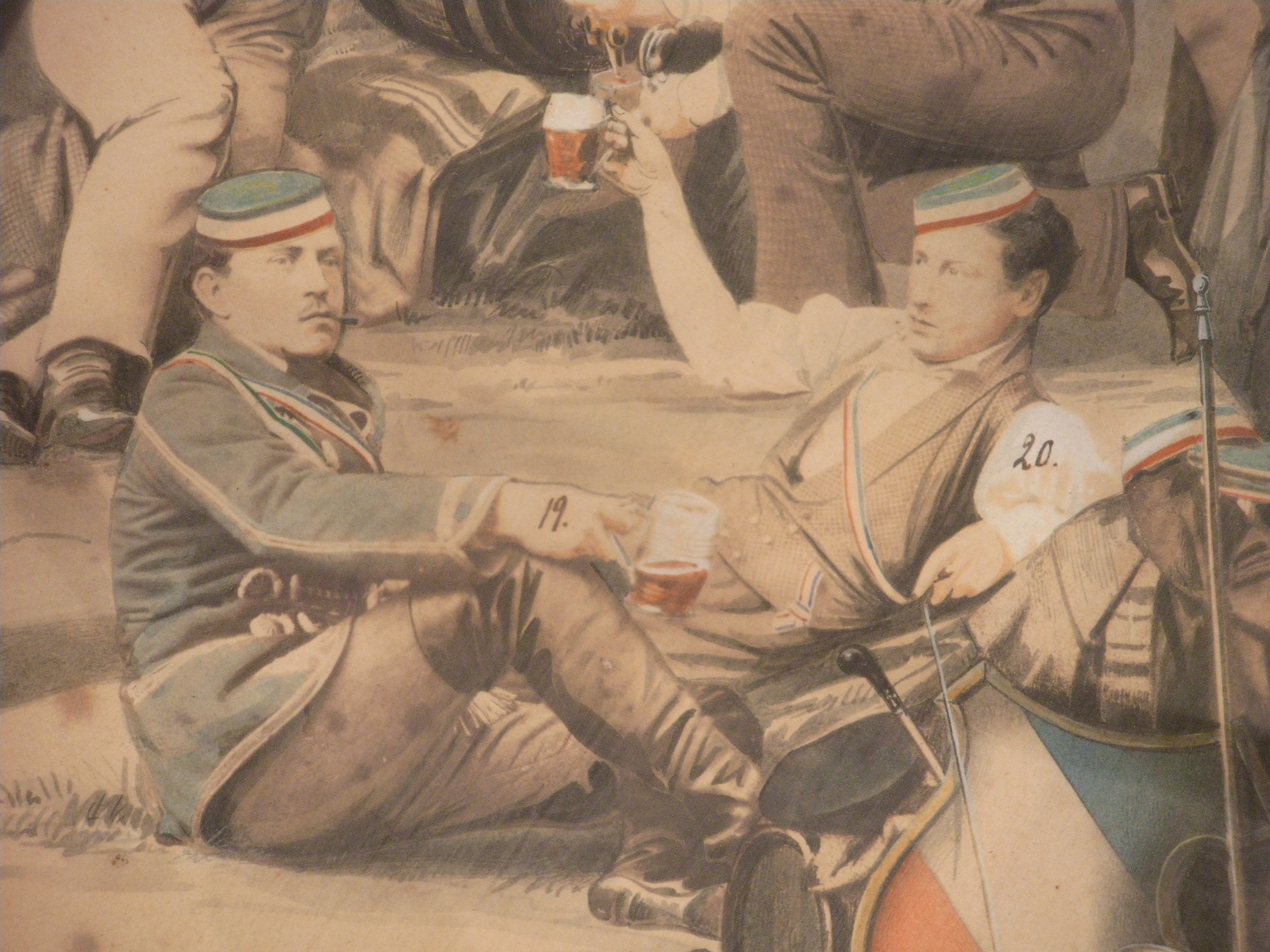
Chemist Ludwig Mond (right) in colors of his Corps

- Helmuth von Maltzahn
- August von Mackensen (1849–1945), German field marshal, Corps Agronomia Göttingen
- Johann-Erasmus Freiherr von Malsen-Ponickau, German police administrator and SS officer, Corps Rheno-Palatia München
- Otto Theodor von Manteuffel, Prussian statesman; Corps Saxonia Halle
- Georg von Manteuffel-Szoege, politician
- Richard Markert, senate president and mayor of Bremen, Corps Germania Leipzig
- Adolf Marschall von Bieberstein
- Walter Masing, physicist; Corps Misnia IV
- Ludwig Maurer, mathematician; Corps Suevia München
- Albert von Maybach, Under State Secretary in the Prussian Ministry of Trade; Corps Hansea Bonn
- Christian Gustav Adolph Mayer, Corps Hildeso-Guestphalia Göttingen
- Prince Maximilian of Baden (1867–1929), last imperial chancellor of Germany
- Kurt Melcher, Police President in Essen and Berlin, Corps Suevia Tübingen
- Friedrich Sigmund Merkel, anatomist; Corps Baruthia Erlangen
- Hanns von Meyenburg (1887–1971), Swiss Pathologist, Corps Tigurinia Zürich
- Georg Michaelis
- Julius von Michel, ophthalmologist; Corps Rhenania Würzburg
- Julius Rudolph Ottomar Freiherr von Minutoli
- Julius von Mirbach, member of the Prussian House of Lords; Corps Borussia Bonn
- Eilhard Mitscherlich, chemist; Corps Guestphalia Heidelberg
- Carl Joseph Anton Mittermaier
- Woldemar Mobitz, Corps Rhenania Freiburg
- Paul Georg von Möllendorff, sinologist, diplomat; Corps Normannia-Halle
- Andreas Mölzer
- Hans Adolf von Moltke
- Ludwig Mond
- Franz Mone, Corps Suevia Heidelberg
- Hans Much, hygienist, writer; Corps Teutonia Marburg
- Alfons Mumm von Schwarzenstein (1859–1924), diplomat of the German Empire, successor of the murdered Baron Clemens von Ketteler as ambassador in Beijing in 1900, Corps Hannovera Göttingen
- Jean de Muralt, Corps Tigurinia Zürich

== N ==
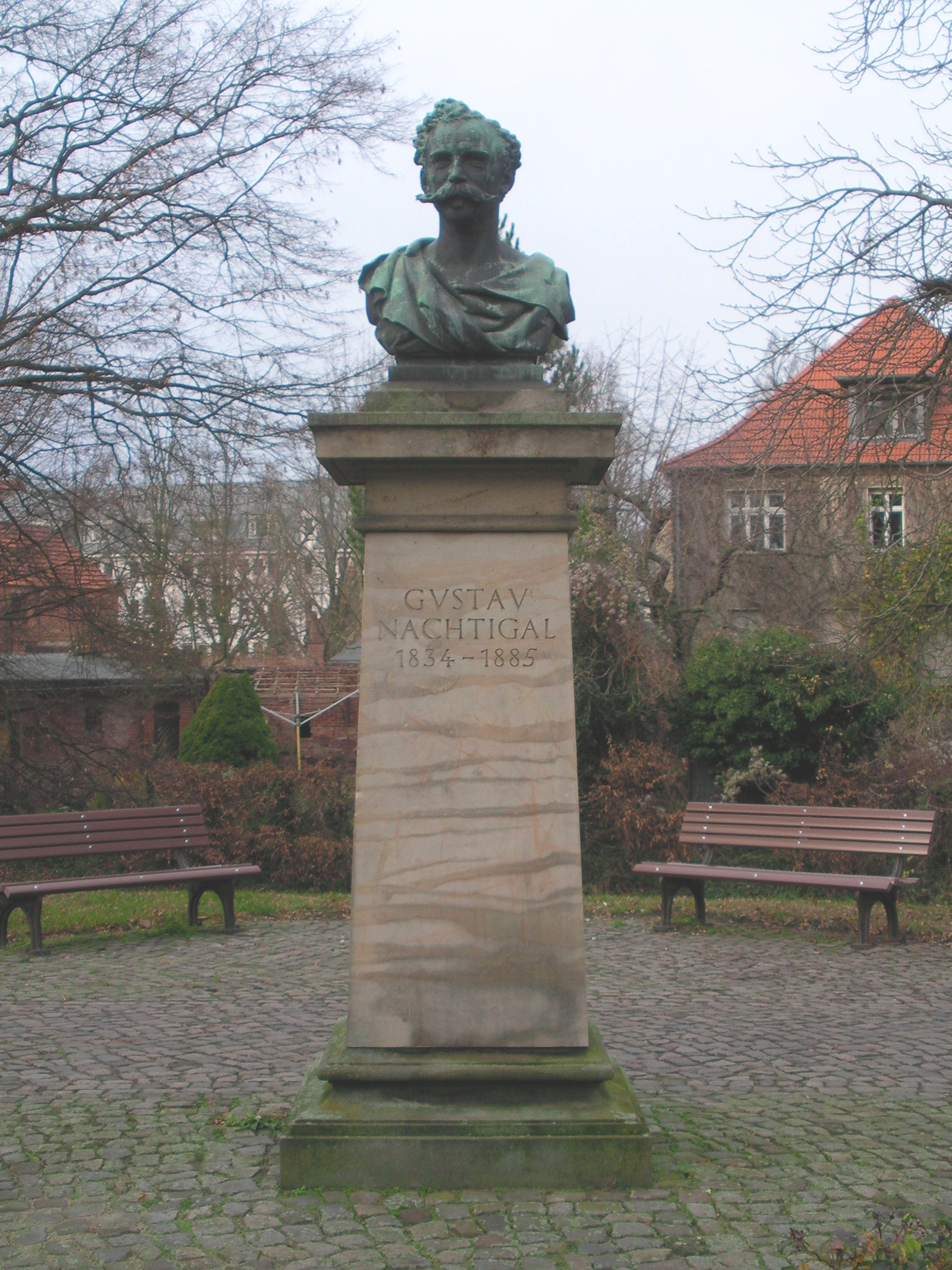
Monument to Gustav Nachtigal in Stendal, Germany

- Gustav Nachtigal (1834–1885), explorer of Central and West Africa; Corps Palaiomarchia Halle, Corps Nassovia Würzburg, Corps Pomerania Greifswald
- Jakob Nagel, State Secretary, Reich Postal Ministry; Burschenschaft Vitruvia Karlsruhe, Karlsruher Burschenschaft Tuiskonia
- Bernhard Naunyn, pharmacologist; Corps Hansea Bonn
- Rudolf Nebel
- Hans Nieland, Hamburg senator, Dresden mayor; Hamburger Burschenschaft Germania
- Fritz Neumayer, Federal Minister; Corps Rhenania Würzburg
- Konstantin von Neurath, German Foreign Minister, Corps Suevia Tübingen
- Otto Nüsslin (1850–1915), Zoologist at the TH Karlsruhe university, Corps Hubertia Freiburg

== O ==
- Maximilian Oberst, surgeon; Corps Isaria München
- Otto von Oehlschläger, president of the Reichsgericht; founder of the Corps Baltia Königsberg
- Goetz Oertel, physicist, past president of Association of Universities for Research in Astronomy (AURA), Associate of the National Academy of Sciences; Corps Masovia Königsberg
- Wilhelm von Opel, founder of Opel; Corps Franconia Darmstadt
- Max von Oppenheim (1860–1946), ancient historian and archaeologist; Corps Palatia Straßburg
- Robert von Ostertag, veterinarian; Corps Suevia Stuttgart

== P ==
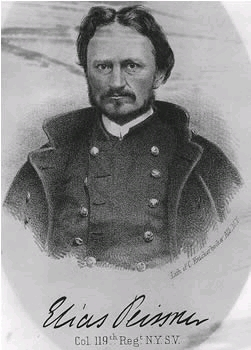
US-Army Colonel and Professor Elias Peissner

- Hans von Pechmann, chemist; Corps Isaria München
- Elias Peissner, Professor at Union College; Corps Palatia München, Corps Alemannia München; member of Sigma Phi and Phi Beta Kappa Society, fallen in the Battle of Chancellorsville
- Hugo Karl Anton Pernice, gynecologist and obstetrician, Corps Hannovera Göttingen, Corps Teutonia Göttingen
- Maximilian Perty, zoologist in Berne; Corps Isaria München
- Carl Wilhelm Petersen
- Hubert Petschnigg, architect; Corps Hansea Wien, Corps Marchia Brünn.
- Baron Karl Ludwig von der Pfordten, legal scholar and politician; Corps Onoldia Erlangen
- Hans Pfundtner, State Secretary, Reich Ministry of the Interior, Corps Masovia Königsberg zu Potsdam
- Kurt Plötner, SS physician, recruited by US intelligence; Corps Thuringia Leipzig
- Count Franz Pocci, artist and composer; Corps Isaria München
- Alfred Pribram, Jewish physician in Prague; Corps Austria
- Robert Prutz, poet and critic; Corps Borussia Halle

== Q ==
- Reinhold Quaatz, civil servant, right-wing politician, half-Jewish in ancestry; Corps Guestphalia Jena

== R ==
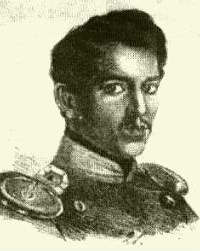
William Nikolaus Reed

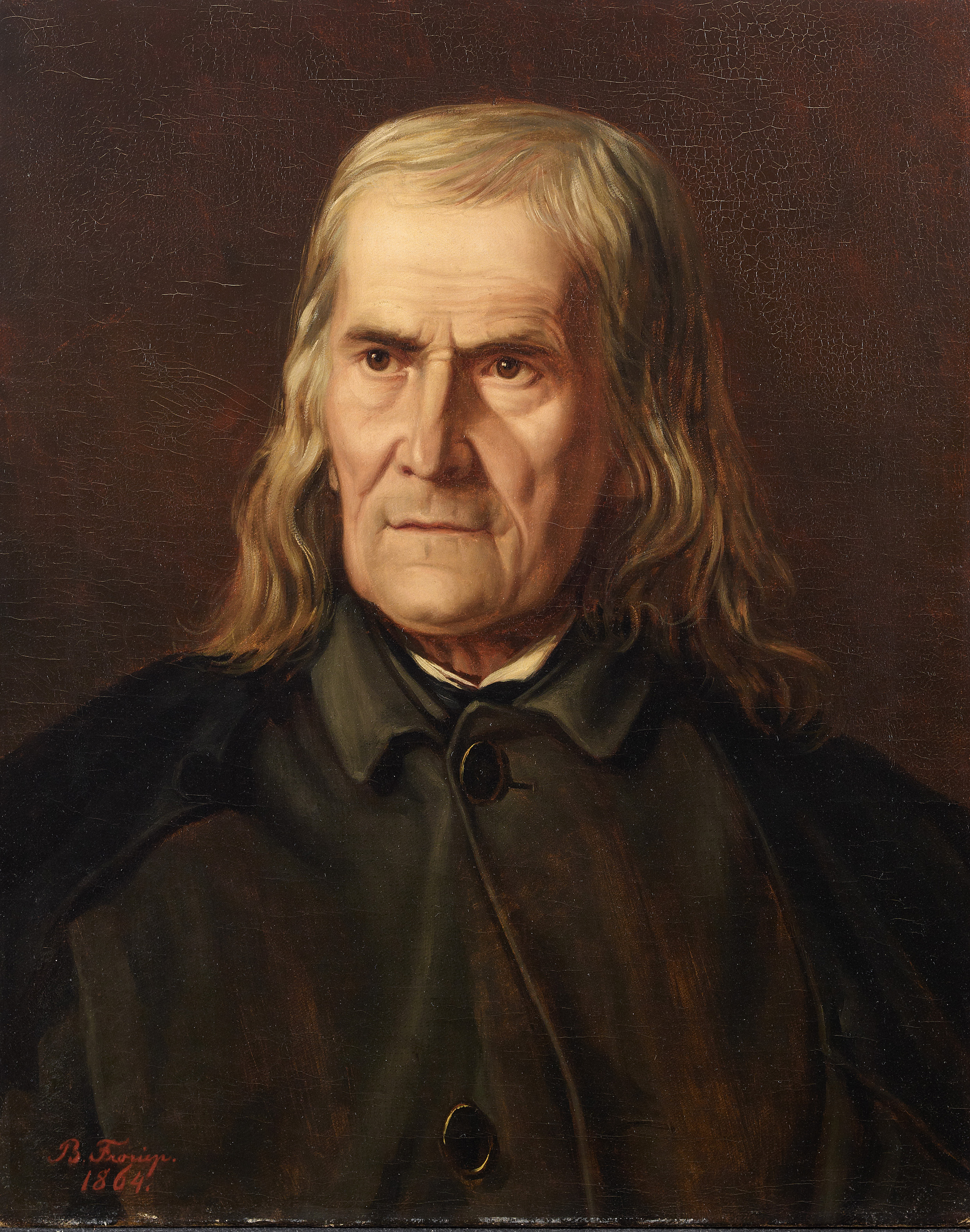
Friedrich Rückert.

- Count von Racowitza, Corps Neoborussia Berlin
- Joseph Maria von Radowitz, Jr., Foreign Secretary; Corps Borussia Bonn
- Hanns Albin Rauter, highest SS and Police Leader in the occupied Netherlands, executed; Corps Joannea Graz
- Count Johann Bernhard von Rechberg und Rothenlöwen, Austrian statesman; Corps Isaria München
- William Nikolaus Reed (1825–1864), highest ranking African American line officer in the U. S. army during the civil war; Corps Saxonia Kiel
- Oskar von Redwitz, poet; Corps Franconia München
- Ludwig Rehn, surgeon; Corps Hasso-Nassovia Marburg
- Joseph Martin Reichard, Corps Rhenania Heidelberg
- Ernst Julius Remak, neurologist; Corps Borussia Breslau
- August Leopold von Reuss (1841–1924), Austrian ophthalmologist; Corps Austria
- Gregor von Rezzori (1914–1998), Austrian novelist and screenwriter, Corps Schacht Leoben
- Friedrich Julius Richelot, mathematician; Corps Masovia Königsberg
- Sigmund von Riezler, historian; Corps Isaria München
- Eduard von Rindfleisch, pathologist; Corps Saxo-Borussia Heidelberg
- Friedrich Wilhelm Ritschl, Corps Lusatia Leipzig
- Hans Joachim von Rohr, agrarian, politician; Corps Saxo-Borussia Heidelberg
- Paul Rohrbach
- Otto Roquette, poet; Corps Teutonia Berlin
- Wilhelm Roscher (1817–1894), economist; Corps Hannovera Göttingen
- Alfred Rosenberg, Corps Rubonia Riga
- Eugen Rosshirt, Corps Bavaria Würzburg
- August von Rothmund, ophthalmologist; Corps Isaria München
- Friedrich Rückert, poet, orientalist; Corps Franconia Würzburg

== S ==
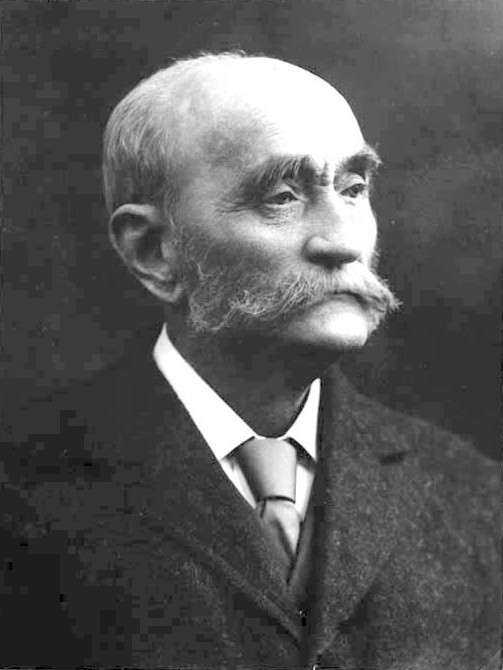
Sir William Schlich

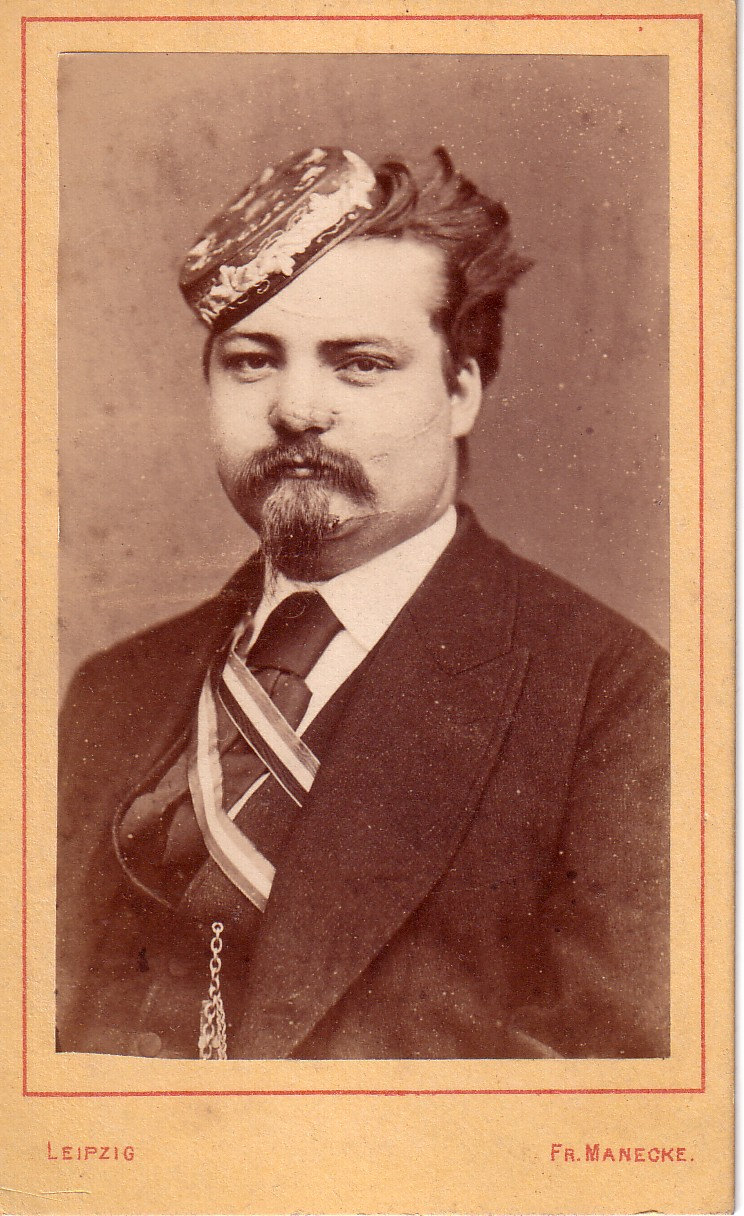
Samuel Hanson Stone as a member of his Leipzig and Heidelberg corps

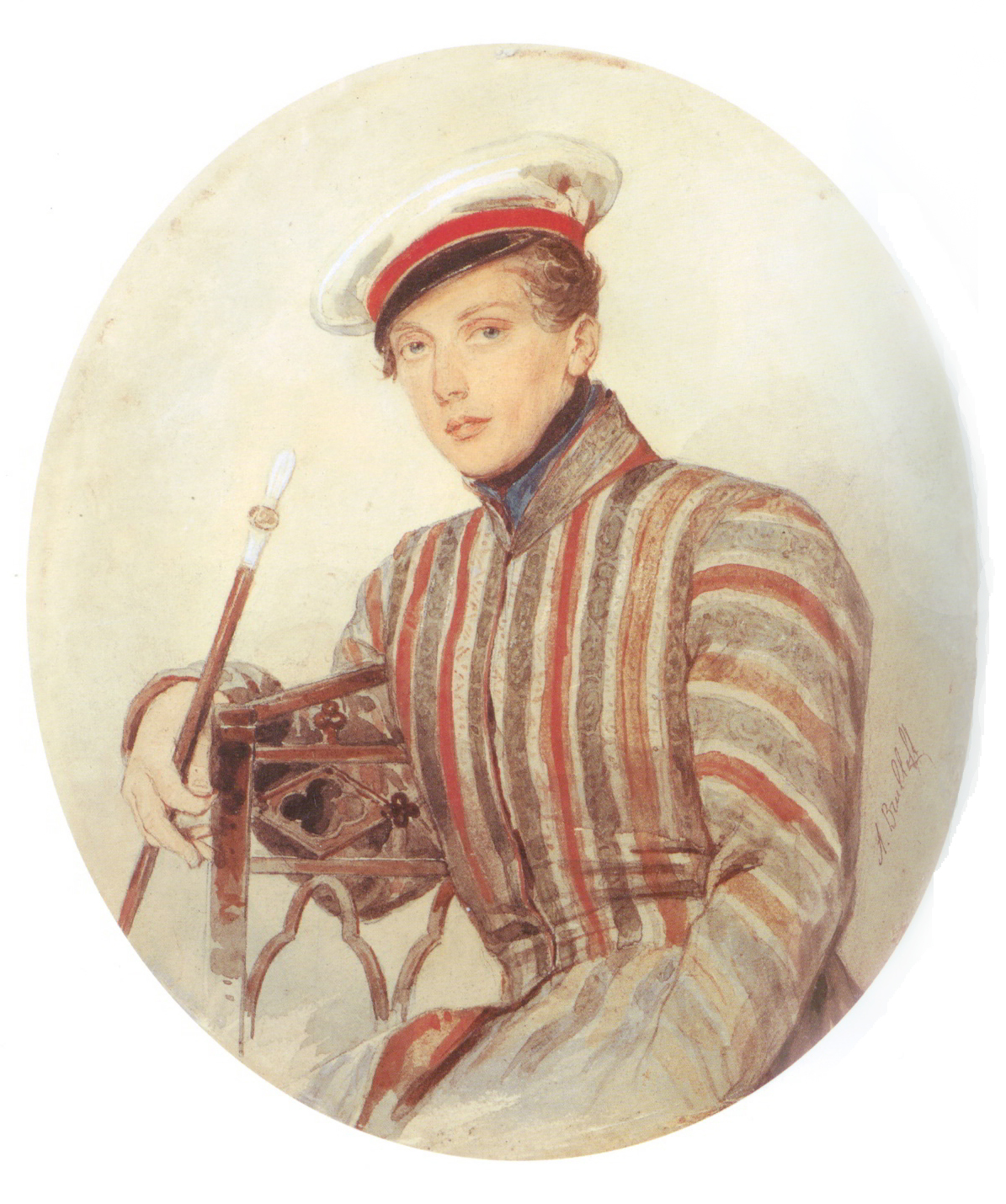
Watercolour of Alexander Suvorov by Alexander Brullov, 1830

- Wilhelm von Salisch, Oberst, Knight's Cross of the Iron Cross with Oakleaves; Corps Saxonia Göttingen
- Gustav von Saltzwedel, Prussian civil servant; founder of the Corps Littuania Königsberg
- Hans Sandrock (1913–1995), officer of the German Army during World War II, decorated with the Knight's Cross of the Iron Cross, Corps Pomerania-Silesa
- Julius Scharlach (1842–1908), Hamburg lawyer, businessman and a prominent figure in the colonial history of Germany, Corps Hannovera Göttingen
- Max Schede, surgeon; Corps Borussia Halle, Corps Tigurinia Zürich
- Rudolf von Scheliha, diplomat, member of the German resistance, executed; Corps Saxo-Borussia Heidelberg
- Anton Schifferer (1871–1943), German business executive and politician; Corps Franconia München
- Gustav Schleicher (1823–1879), German-born Democratic United States Representative from Texas, veteran of the Confederate Army; Corps Starkenburgia Gießen
- Alexander von Schleinitz, Foreign Minister of Prussia; Corps Saxonia Halle
- Friedrich Ferdinand, Duke of Schleswig-Holstein (1913–1989), Oberst of the Wehrmacht; Corps Saxonia Göttingen
- Hanns Martin Schleyer, Corps Suevia Heidelberg
- Wilhelm Philipp Daniel Schlich (1840–1925), forester in India; Corps Hassia Gießen
- Ernst Reinhold Schmidt (1819–1901), spokesman of the German immigrants in Philadelphia, author of The History of the American Civil War and The Founding of Pennsylvania: the German View of our Bi-centennial (1882); Corps Masovia Königsberg
- Edzard Schmidt-Jortzig, legal scholar and past Federal Minister; Corps Hansea Bonn
- Otto Schott, industrialist, inventor of borosilicate glass; Corps Teutonia Braunschweig
- Karl Ludwig Ernst Schroeder, gynecologist; Corps Nassovia Würzburg
- Fritz-Dietlof von der Schulenburg officer, German Resistance, executed; Corps Saxonia Göttingen
- Max Schuler, Schuler tuning, gyrocompass; Corps Franconia München
- Walter Schultze (1894–1979), German physician and Nazi Party official; Corps Isaria
- Ernst Schulze (1789–1817), German romantic poet, Corps Hannovera Göttingen
- Robert Schumann, composer; Corps Saxo-Borussia Heidelberg
- Berent Schwineköper (1912–1993), historian; Corps Teutonia Göttingen
- Hans-Christoph Seebohm, federal minister; Corps Hasso-Borussia Freiburg
- Heinrich Seetzen (1906–1945), lawyer and Gestapo official; Turnerschaft Philippina-Saxonia Marburg
- Franz Seldte, founder and Leader of Der Stahlhelm, Minister for Labour of the German Reich; Corps Teutonia-Hercynia Braunschweig
- Friedrich Wilhelm Semmler, chemist; Corps Silesia Breslau
- Carl Semper, Corps Visurgia Hannover
- Eduard Caspar Jacob von Siebold, gynecologist; Corps Lusatia Berlin, Corps Lusatia Leipzig
- Philipp Franz von Siebold, Corps Moenania Würzburg
- Ernst Siehr
- Gustav Simon, surgeon in Heidelberg; Corps Starkenburgia Gießen; Corps Saxo-Borussia Heidelberg
- Eduard von Simson, Jewish-born father of the first German constitution; Littauer-Kränzchen (Corps Littuania Königsberg)
- Reinhold Solger, prominent Forty-Eighter, historian, Professor at West-Point United States Military Academy; Corps Marchia Halle, Corps Guestfalia Greifswald, founder and honorary member of Corps Borussia Greifswald
- Alexander Spengler, founder of Davos medicine; Corps Suevia Heidelberg
- Bernhard Sprengel, industrialist, founder of the Sprengel Museum; Corps Holsatia Kiel
- Martin Stamm, founder of Cleveland Clinic
- Ernst Rüdiger Starhemberg (1899–1956), Austrian politician, 163rd Knight of the Order of the Golden Fleece, Corps Rhaetia Innsbruck now Augsburg
- Hermann Stieve, anatomist; Corps Franconia München
- Christian Friedrich, Baron Stockmar, Corps Onoldia Erlangen, Corps Franconia Würzburg
- Otto of Stolberg-Wernigerode, Corps Saxo-Borussia Heidelberg
- Otto Stolz, Austrian mathematician, his name lives on in the Stolz-Cesàro theorem, Corps Rhaetia Innsbruck now Augsburg;
- Samuel Hanson Stone, Corps Thuringia Leipzig, Corps Rhenania Heidelberg
- Adolph Strecker, chemist; Corps Teutonia Gießen
- Louis Stromeyer (1804–1876), German surgeon, Corps Hannovera Göttingen
- Gustav Struve, Corps Bado-Württembergia Göttingen
- Franz Susemihl, classical philologist; Corps Misnia Leipzig
- Alexander Arkadyevich Suvorov, Prince of Italy, Count Rymniksky (1804–1882), Russian general, diplomat and politician, Corps Curonia Göttingen

== T ==
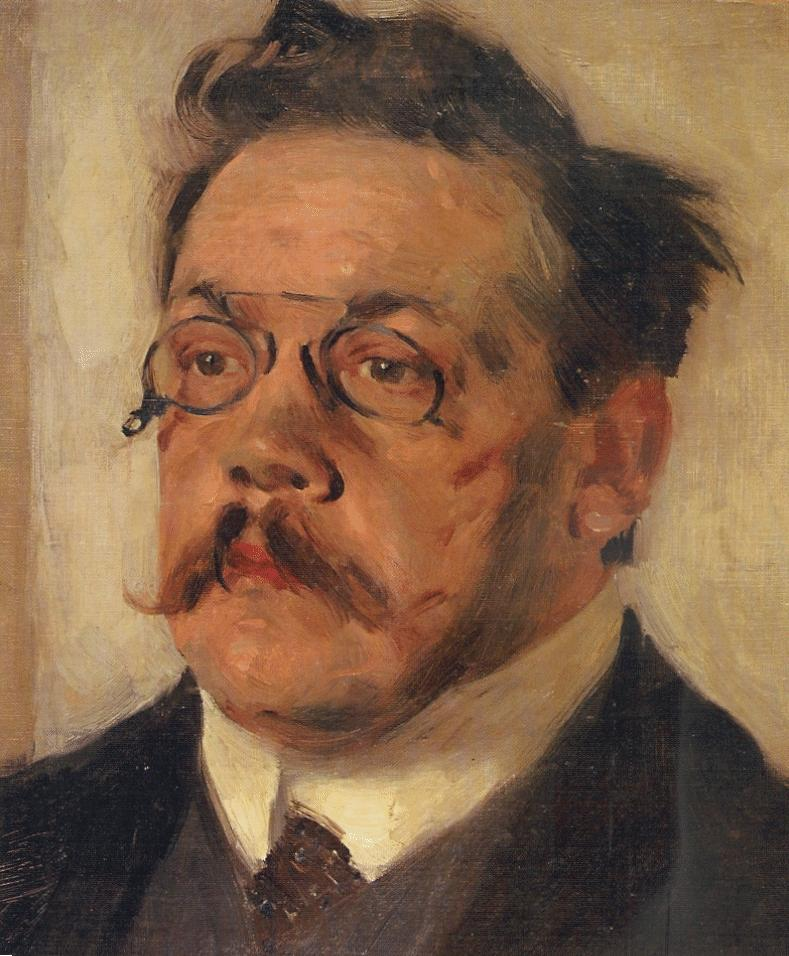
Ludwig Thoma, by Karl Klimsch

- Ludwig Thoma, Bavarian writer; Corps Suevia München
- Johann Ludwig Wilhelm Thudichum, physician and biochemist; Corps Hassia Gießen
- Heinrich Triepel, legal scholar; Corps Suevia Freiburg
- Adam von Trott zu Solz, member of the German resistance, executed; Corps Saxonia Göttingen

== U ==
- Edward Uhl, New Yorker Staats-Zeitung, Corps Rhenania ZAB, Corps Franconia Karlsruhe
- Paul Uhlenhuth, bacteriologist; Corps Franconia Hamburg
- Hermann Ulrici, philosopher; Corps Saxonia Halle

== V ==
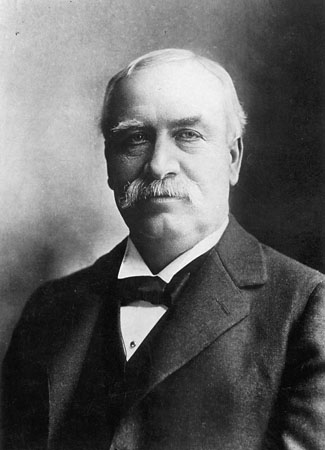
Northern Pacific Railway tycoon Henry Villard

- Karl von Vierordt, physiologist; Corps Suevia Heidelberg
- Victor II, Duke of Ratibor, Corps Saxonia Göttingen
- Henry Villard, American railroads tycoon; Corps Franconia München
- Carl Vogt
- Carl von Voit, physiologist; Corps Franconia München
- Otto Volger, Corps Hannovera Göttingen
- Richard von Volkmann, surgeon and poet

== W ==
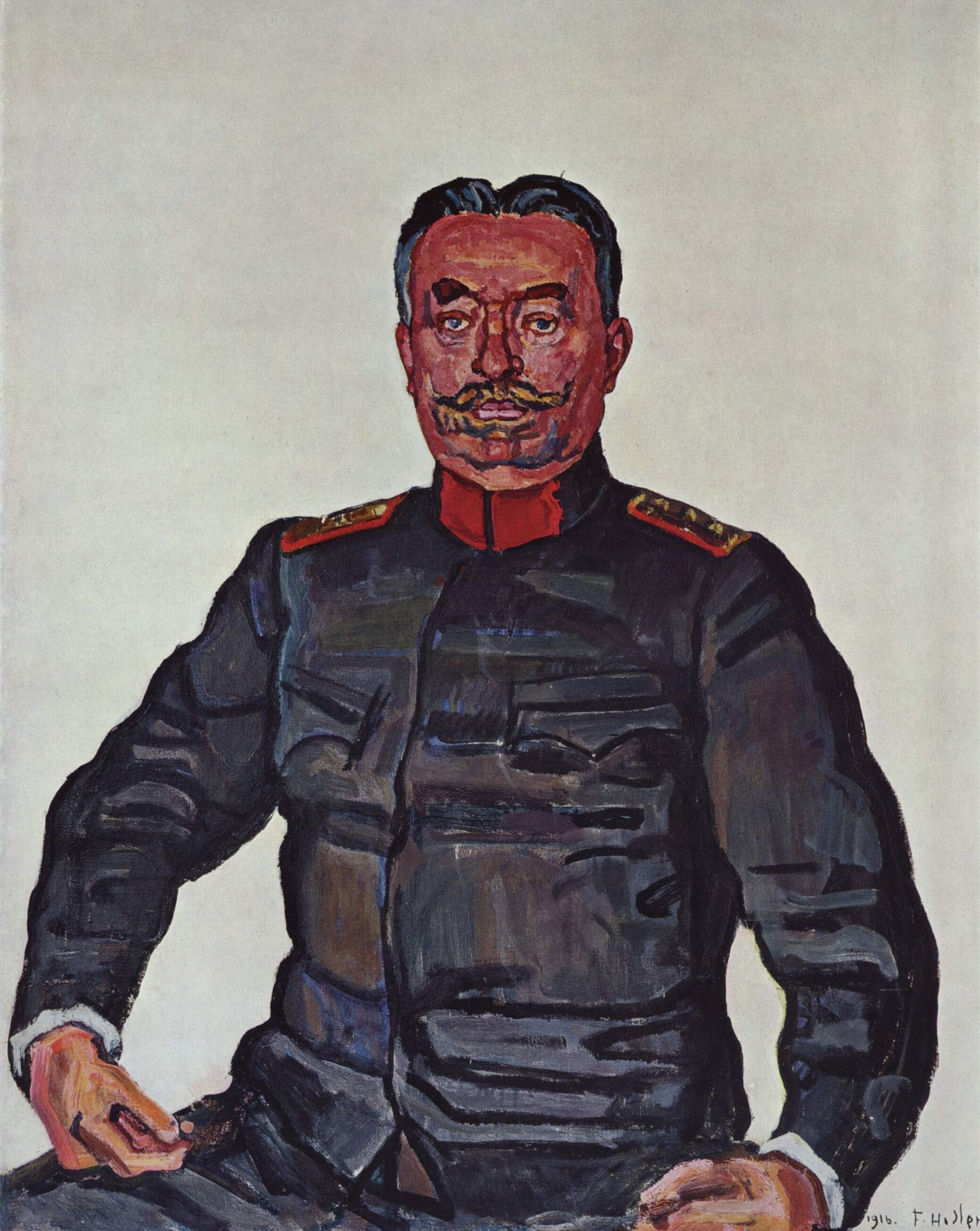
Portrait of Ulrich Wille by Ferdinand Hodler

- Werner Wachsmuth, "nestor of the German surgeons"; Corps Rhenania Würzburg, Corps Suevia Tübingen
- Johann Andreas Wagner, zoologist; Corps Bavaria Würzburg
- Richard Wagner, composer, Corps Saxonia Leipzig
- Max Waldau (1825–1855), German poet and novelist, Corps Silesia Breslau
- Benedict Waldeck, left-leaning deputy in the Prussian National Assembly; Corps Guestphalia II Göttingen
- Karl Weierstrass, Corps Saxonia Bonn
- Arthur von Weinberg, industrialist; Corps Transrhenania München
- Erwin Weinmann (1909–declared dead 1949), physician, SS-Oberfuhrer; Corps Ghibellinia Tübingen
- Christian Samuel Weiss, mineralogist; Corps Montania Freiberg
- Carl Theodor Welcker, legal scholar and liberal politician; Corps Franconia Gießen
- Friedrich Gottlieb Welcker, classical philologist and archaeologist; Corps Lahnania Gießen
- Hermann Welcker, anatomist and anthropologist; Corps Teutonia Gießen, Corps Palatia Bonn
- Karl Weltzien, chemist; Corps Suevia Heidelberg
- Heinrich Wendland, botanist; Corps Hannovera Göttingen
- Horst Wessel, Nazi activist, Horst Wessel Lied; Corps Normannia Berlin, Corps Alemannia Wien
- Moritz Wiggers, jurist and democratic politician; Corps Vandalia Rostock, Corps Hanseatia Rostock, Corps Guestphalia Heidelberg
- William Ernest, Grand Duke of Saxe-Weimar-Eisenach, Corps Borussia Bonn
- William II of Württemberg, Corps Bremensia Göttingen, Corps Suevia Tübingen
- Max Wirth, Corps Rhenania Heidelberg
- Heinrich Wendland, Corps Hannovera Göttingen
- Theodor Wiegand
- Ulrich Wille, Corps Tigurinia Zürich
- Friedrich Hermann Wölfert, publisher and aviation pioneer; founder of the Corps Plavia Leipzig

== Y ==
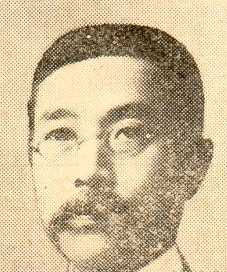
Japanese secretary of state Yamamoto Teijirō

- Nikolay Yazykov, Russian poet, Corps Ruthenia Dorpat
- Yamamoto Teijirō, Japanese industrialist and politician, Corps Germania Hohenheim
- Peter Yorck von Wartenburg, member of the German resistance, executed

== Z ==
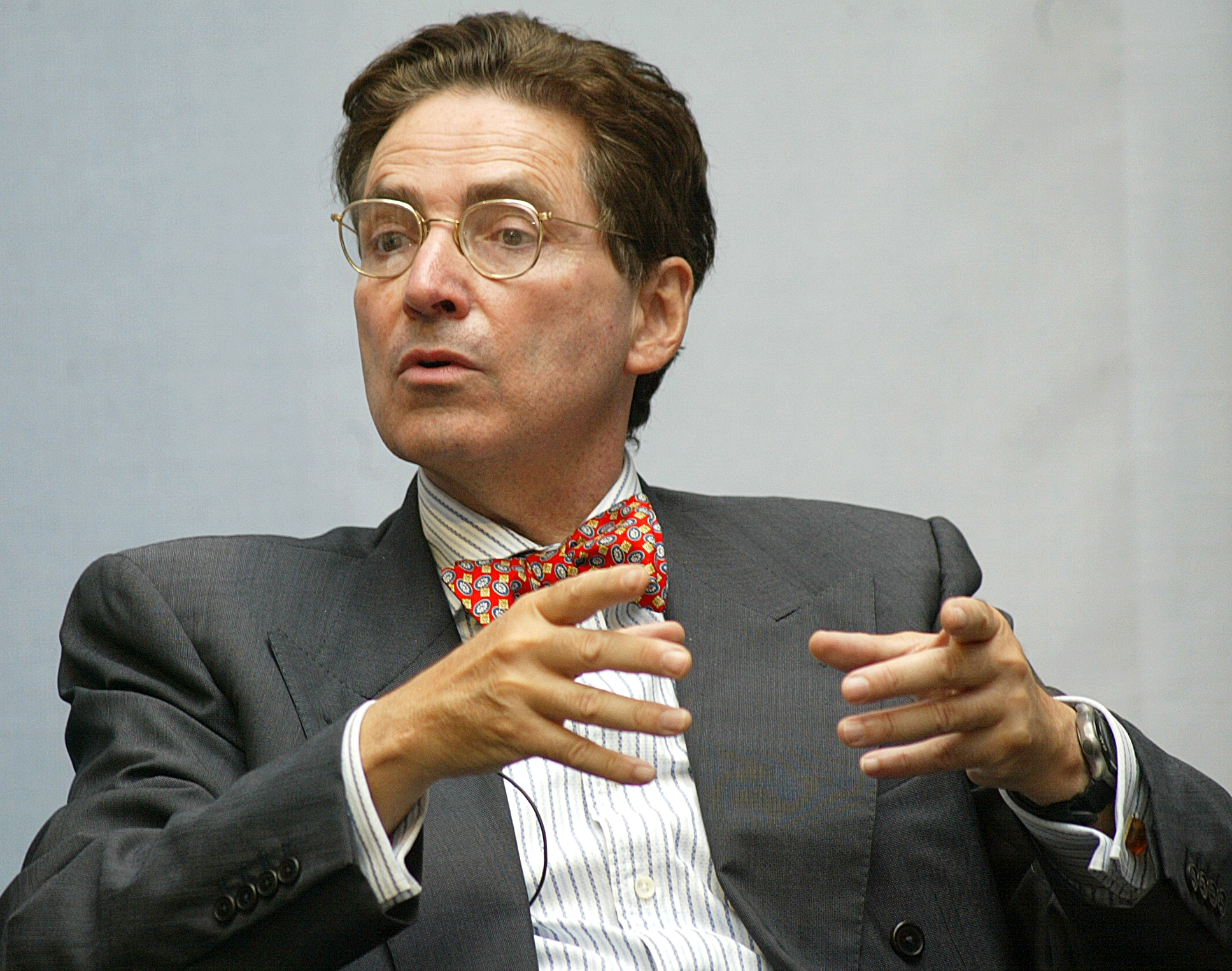
United Nations official Alfred-Maurice de Zayas

- Eberhard Zahn (1910–2010), manager, Corps Austria
- Joachim Zahn, CEO Mercedes-Benz, Corps Rhenania Tübingen
- Alfred-Maurice de Zayas, Corps Rhenania Tübingen
- Hans Zehrer
- Ernst Ziehm
- Hermann Zimmer (8 October 1867 in Ocklitz, district Breslau, † 22 April 1928 in Breslau) was a German trade unionist and social democratic politician. Most recently, he was Oberpräsident the Prussian province of Lower Silesia
- Eugen von Zimmerer, Corps Bavaria Würzburg
- Arthur Zimmermann, Imperial State Secretary (Zimmermann Telegram)
- Franz Heinrich Zitz
- Hans von Zwiedineck-Südenhorst (1845–1906), Austrian historian; Corps Teutonia Graz, Vandalia Graz und Saxonia Wien

== Bibliography ==
- Hans-Georg Balder, Rüdiger B. Richter: Korporierte im amerikanischen Bürgerkrieg, Hilden: WJK-Verlg, 2007
- Otto Gerlach: Kösener Corps-Listen 1930, Frankfurt am Main 1930.
- Otto Gerlach: Kösener Corpslisten 1960, Kassel 1961.
- Hermann Kruse: Kösener Corpslisten 1996, Gesamtverzeichnis 1919–1996, Nürnberg-Fürth 1998.
- Rosco G.S. Weber: The German Corps in the Third Reich, Macmillan London 1986
- Stephen Klimczuk, Gerald Warner: Secret Places, Hidden Sanctuaries: Uncovering Mysterious Sights, Symbols, and Societies, Sterling Publishing Company, 2009, p. 224–232 (The German University Corps)
