= Wilhelm Theodor Schiefler =

German-Brazilian writer, professor and linguist

Wilhelm Heinrich Theodor (von) Schiefler, also Guilherme Henrique Theodoro Schiefler (March 5, 1828 in Hannover – 1884 in Petropolis, Rio de Janeiro, Brazil) was a German-Brazilian writer, professor and linguist.

== Life ==
Wilhelm Heinrich Theodor (von) Schiefler was born on March 5, 1828, in Hanover, as the son of the chamber auditor August Schiefler and his wife, born Tovothe. He was married to Sophie Alviene von Lasperg and had several sons.

Starting in 1848 he studied law at the University of Göttingen. He became a member of the student fraternity Corps Hannovera. After the first exam he took a job as a royal Hanoverian official assessor, and became a doctor of law at the University of Göttingen. After working as a judge for several years, he moved to Brazil with his wife's family in 1853 with the intention of promoting the country's colonization. But the circumstances did not meet his expectations and he chose to specialize in teaching languages.

Subsequently, he worked as a teacher of Latin, Greek, German and English at several private schools in the country and was even reader of the Emperor Pedro II of Brazil.

In 1858 he was appointed professor of Greek philology at the well known imperial Colégio Pedro II in Rio de Janeiro, Brazil. The Colégio Pedro II was the highest and most prestigious school in the country at this time. He also became a professor of German language at the Instituto Commercial do Rio de Janeiro in 1860, where he taught at the same time.

In 1860 his work on the grammar of the German language "Grammatica da lingua allemã" appeared in Portuguese, which contained a new method for translating and learning the German language. He also translated literary works from Portuguese into German and from German into Portuguese. In 1865 he published his Portuguese translation of the "Greek grammar" of the German classical scholar Raphael Kühner. In 1873 he published his German translation of the geographical description of Brazil written by the Brazilian writer Joaquim Manuel de Macedo. His translation of this work was exhibited at the 1873 World Exhibition in Vienna in the Industrial Palace.

== Publications ==
- Schiefler, Guilherme Henrique Theodoro: Grammatica as lingua allemã, ou se novo methodological completo para aprender a traduzir, escrever e falar a lingua allemã; organisado sobre os melhores dos trabalhos grammaticos (Grammar of the German language, or an entirely new method for Learning to translate, write and speak the German language), Rio de Janeiro, EH Lammert, 1860. Second Ed 1862
- Schiefler, Guilherme Henrique Theodoro (transl.): Grammatica Grega, of Raphael Kühner, FA Brockhaus, 1865 – 194 pages, translated by Guilherme Henrique Schiefler Theodoro.
- Schiefler, Guilherme Henrique Theodoro: Geographische Beschreibung Brasiliens von Joaquim Manuel de Macedo. (Geographical Description of Brazil of Joaquim Manuel de Macedo) and translated by MP Alves Nogueira and Wilhelm Theodor von Schiefler, Leipzig, FA Brockhaus of print, 1873, 535 pages.

== Literature ==
- Innocencio Francisco da Silva: Diccionario bibliographico portuguez (bibliographic reference for Portugal and Brasil) Lisboa, Na Imprensa Nacional, 1870, p. 435 (online)
- José Galante Sousa: Índice de biobibliografia brasileira. Instituto Nacional do Livro, Mininstério da Educação e Cultura, 1963
