= Walter Masing =

German physicist (1915–2004)

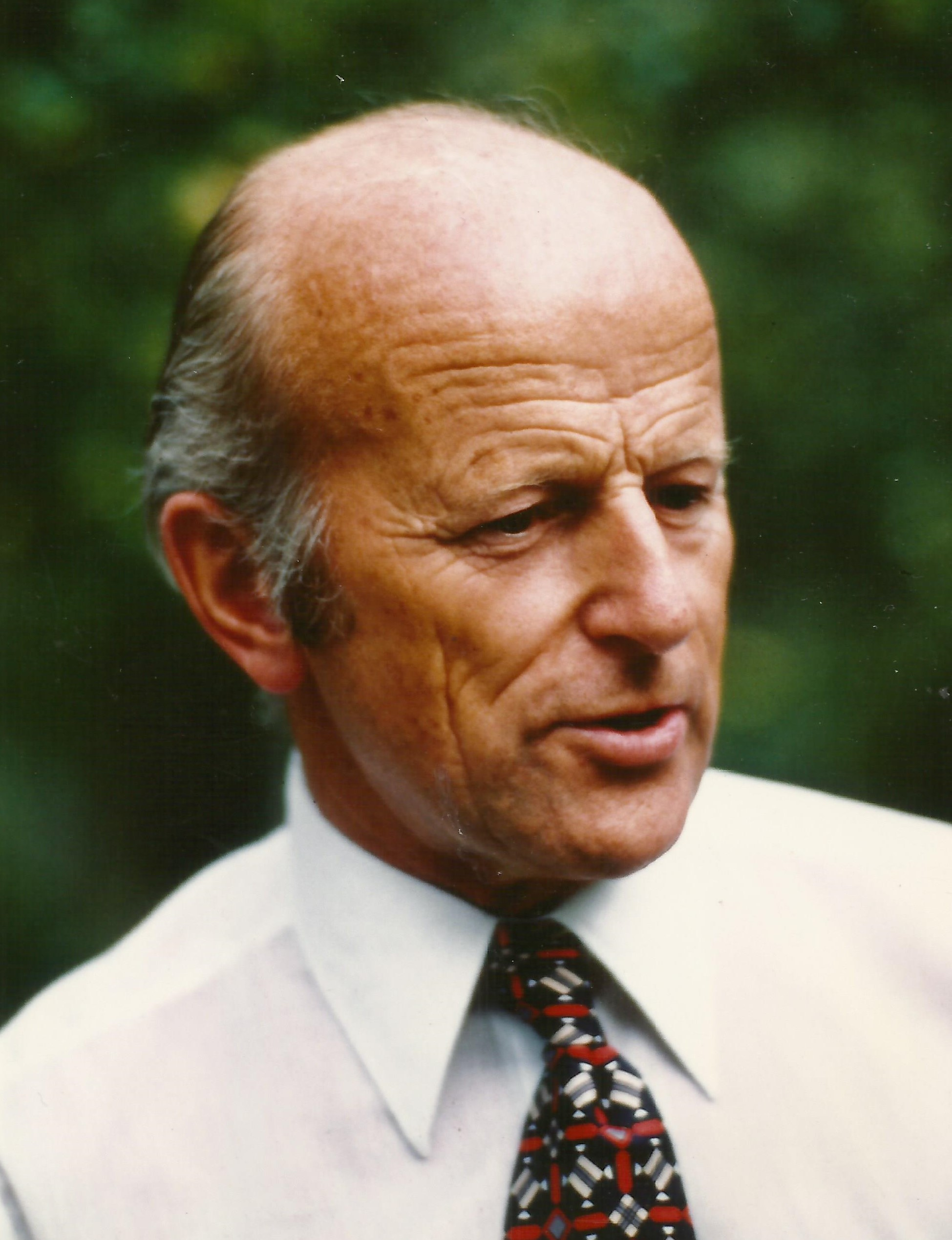
Walter Masing (1975)

Walter Masing (22 June 1915 in Petrograd – 29 March 2004 in Erbach) was a German physicist and honorary president of the German Association for Quality. He promoted and sponsored the development of industrial quality management in Germany, and wrote the Handbook of Quality Assurance which became the standard work in the industry, in Germany. The Walter E. Masing book prize is awarded annually to recognise the most noteworthy book in the discipline of quality management
