= Mitchell Campbell King =

American physician

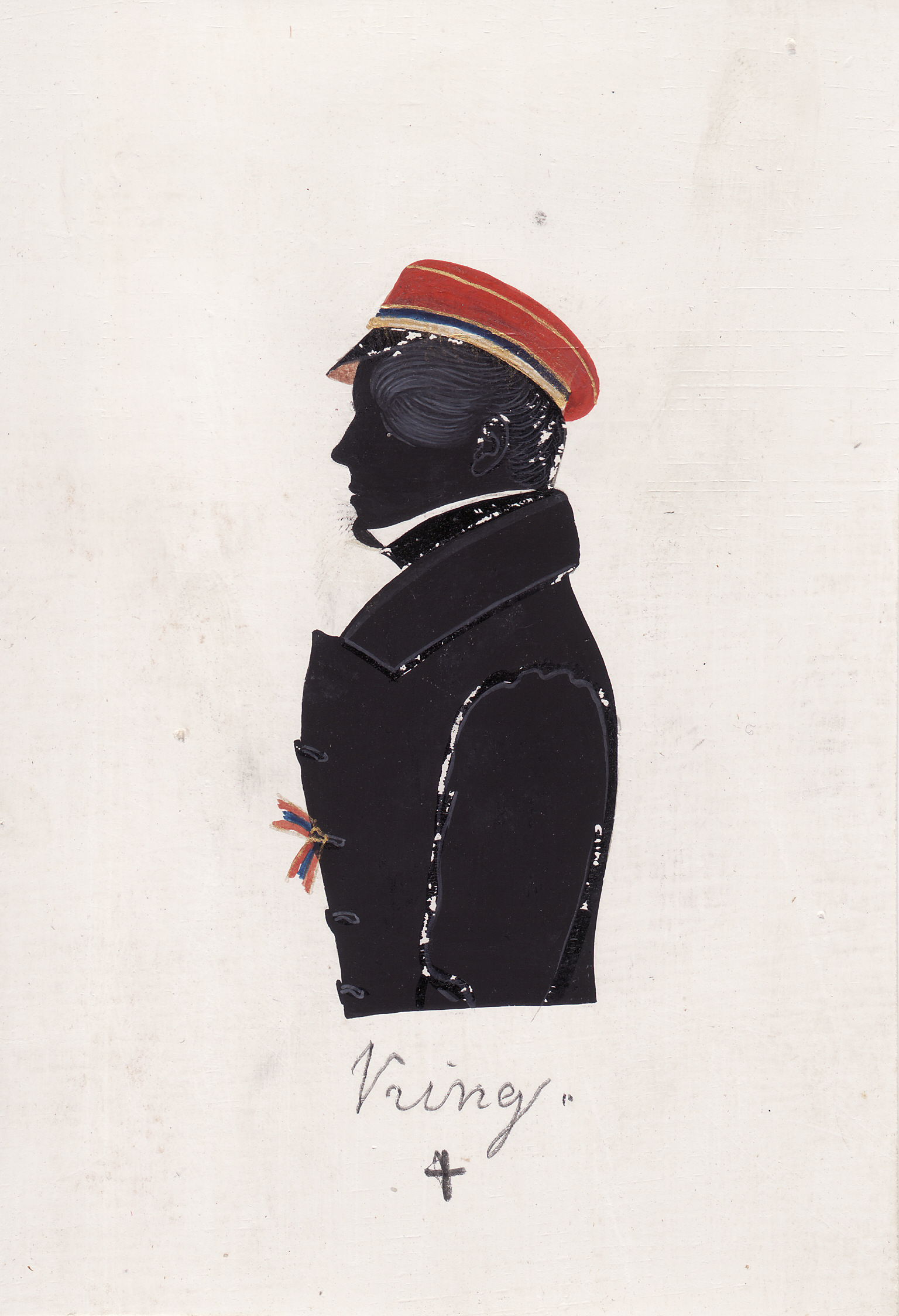
Silhouette portrait of Mitchell Campbell King (1832/33 in Göttingen wearing the Hanoverian colours and student cap)

Mitchell Campbell King (born June 1815 in Charleston, South Carolina; died 1901) was a planter and physician in the Carolinas.

Mitchell Campbell King was the son of teacher, lawyer and Judge Mitchel King (Kingo) and his first wife Susanna Campbell. The elder King headed to South Carolina in 1810 and both married on 23 February 1811 in Charleston. They had seven children.

Mitchell C. King was the second-oldest; and with him began the family tradition in using his mother's maiden name Campbell in remembrance of the family's Scottish heritage. He studied medicine at the Charleston Medical College in South Carolina and at Göttingen University in Germany. In Göttingen he was friends with Amory Coffin (1813–1884) from Coffin Point Plantation and John Lothrop Motley. The three of them became friends with the later German Chancellor Otto von Bismarck there in 1832. Both Bismarck and King joined Corps Hannovera Göttingen—a German Student Corps committed to academic fencing—as fellows. Mitchell C. King finished his medical education with an M.D. from Charleston Medical College and settled on one of the family's farms in South Carolina and Georgia.

In the summer time the King family lived in the mountains of Flat Rock in the western part of North Carolina. Later in his life he concentrated on practicing as a physician there in Henderson County. He maintained a lively correspondence with Bismarck until 1875. Bismarck's letters to him are preserved in the U.S. Library of Congress, while some of King's letters are kept by the Otto-von-Bismarck-Stiftung in Friedrichsruh near Hamburg (Germany), which is a commemorative German Government Foundation in memory of the Chancellor of the German Empire (similar to the Presidential libraries in the United States).

Mitchell C. King married Elizabeth Laura Middleton in Charleston. They had eleven children. King was buried in Magnolia Cemetery (Charleston, South Carolina).
