= Corps Hannovera Göttingen =

German student corps

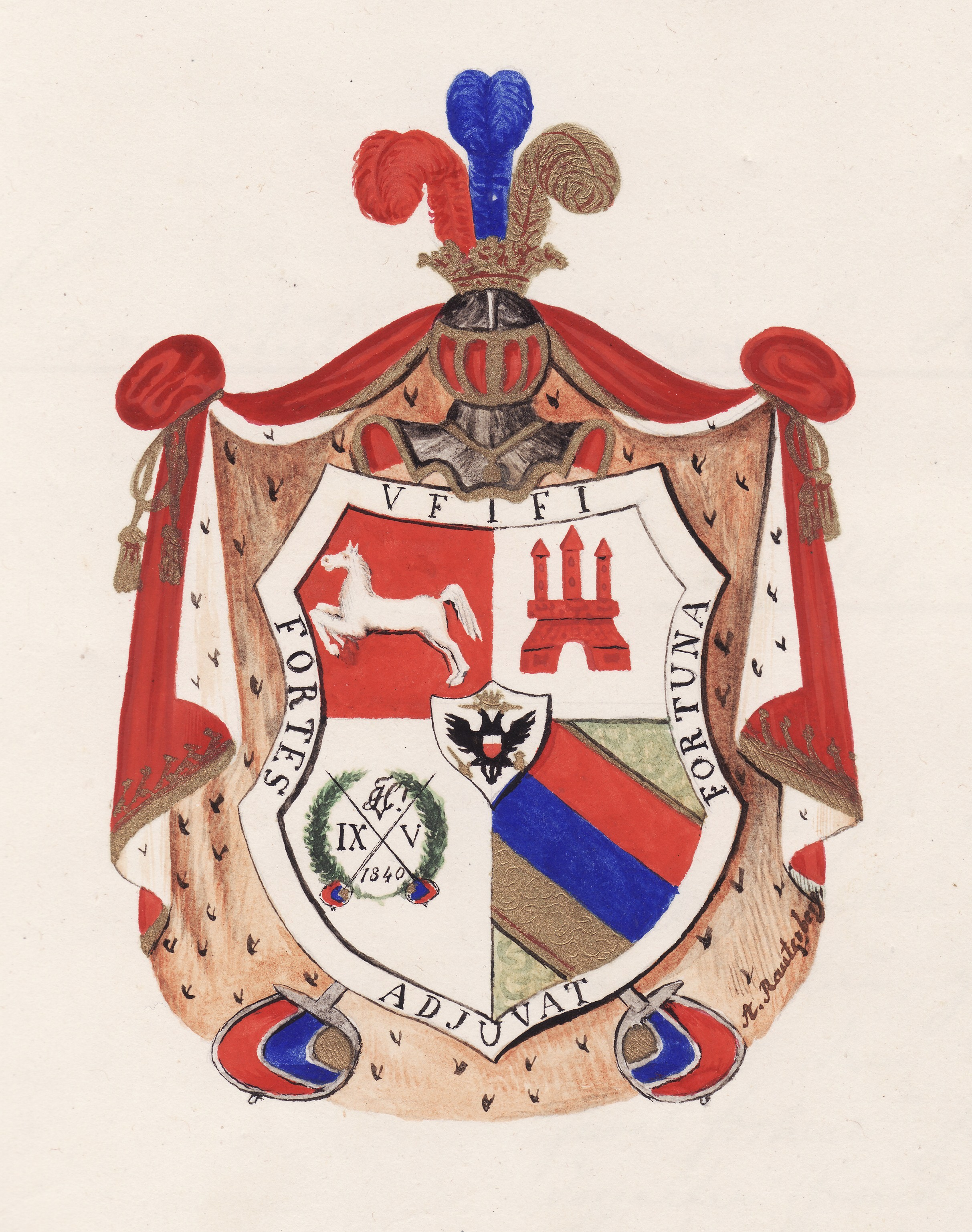
- Founded: January 18, 1809; 216 years ago Georg August University of Göttingen
- Type: Studentenverbindung
- Affiliation: KSCV
- Status: Active
- Scope: Local
- Motto: Nunquam retrorsum, fortes adiuvat fortuna!
- Colors: Scarlet, Cornflower Blue and Gold
- Zirkel
- Chapters: 1
- Headquarters: Bürgerstraße 56 / 58; Göttingen 37073; Germany
- Website: www.hannovera.org

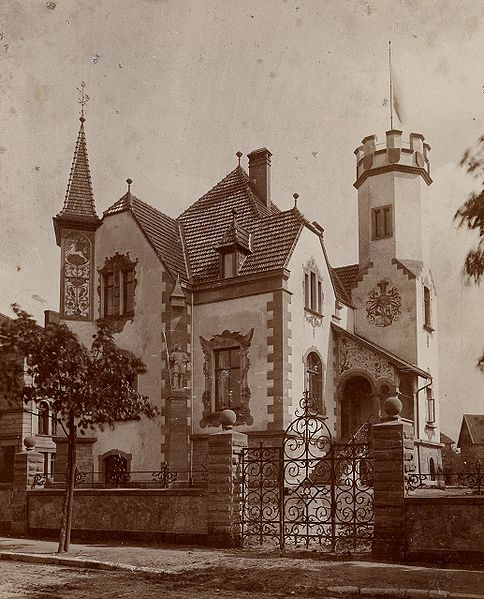
corps house in Göttingen (ca. 1900)

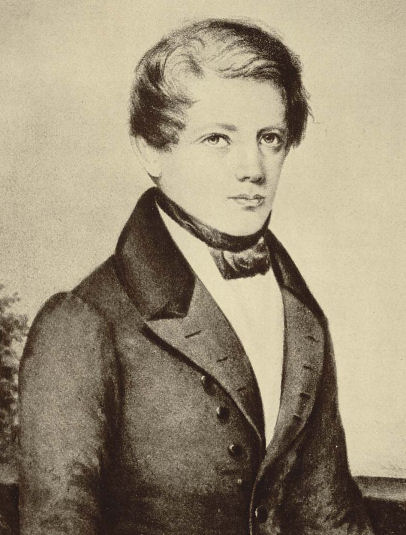
Bismarck 1836

The Corps Hannovera Göttingen is one of the oldest German Student Corps, a Studentenverbindung or student corporation founded on January 18, 1809, at the Georg August University of Göttingen by Georg Kloss and his associates. The name was chosen because the founders had their home residences in the Kingdom of Hanover. As a corps it is a founding member (1848) of the Kösener Senioren-Convents-Verband (KSCV), the oldest governing body of such student associations in both Germany and Austria.

The Corps Hannovera still commits itself to the principles of academic fencing, as well as the common principles of tolerance and democracy shared by all Corps of the KSCV. Its members wear red and blue couleur (red cap and tricoloured sash) on official occasions. Hannovera's Latin motto is Nunquam retrorsum, fortes adiuvat fortuna! (engl: Never backward, fortune favours the bold).

The Corps Hannovera officially regards 18 January 1809 as its founding date though it can be proved that there were similar gatherings of Hanoverian students in Göttingen as far back as 1735.

The Corps Hannovera is also a founding member of the blaues Prinzip or blue principle (along with fellow cartel Corps Teutonia Marburg and Lusatia Leipzig). The blue principle is a social principle which consists of the promotion of gentlemanly conduct and social behavior. Flowing from these ideals Corps Hannovera host several social events in their club house (Corpshaus) which are generally regarded as some of the most coveted and exclusive social occasions in Göttingen.

The most famous member of the Corps Hannovera was Otto von Bismarck, who became known for eccentric behaviour, consequently he was forced to live outside the town walls, and was once placed under arrest for a period of ten days in the university jail (in German: Karzer). Other famous members of Corps Hanovera Göttingen were general Friedrich Balduin von Gagern, the leader of the liberal opposition in the Reichstag, Rudolf von Bennigsen, economist Wilhelm Roscher, poet Ernst Schulze, botanist Heinrich Wendland, surgeon Louis Stromeyer, geologist Otto Volger, linguist Wilhelm Theodor Schiefler, fisheries expert Walther Herwig, the Imperial German ambassador to China and Japan Alfons Mumm von Schwarzenstein and Wolfgang Kapp.

The Corps has some members from the United Kingdom and the United States. Including the later physician Mitchell Campbell King from South Carolina, who belonged to the circle of Bismarck's American friends in Göttingen. During his stay at Gottingen in 1856 John Pierpont Morgan joined the Corps, but was "not a full fledged member" since he wanted to avoid a smite. Others have worked in the US and Canada like surgeon Hinrich Bitter-Suermann.

== Symbols ==
The motto of the Corps is Nunquam retrorsum, fortes adiuvat fortuna!. Its colors are scarlet, cornflower blue, and gold.
