= Georg Kloss =

German historian of freemasonry

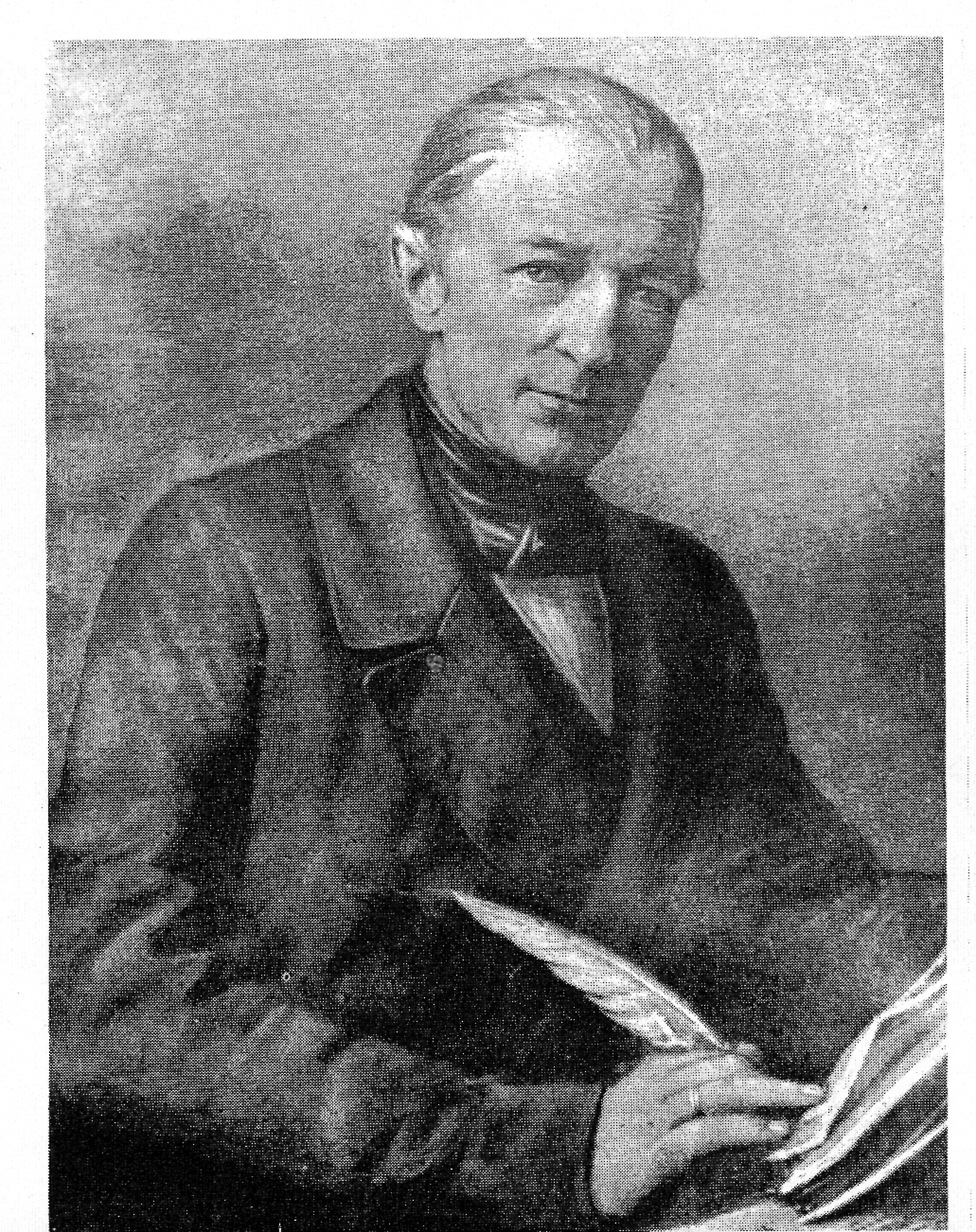
Georg Kloss

Georg Franz Burkhard Kloss (31 July 1787 Frankfurt am Main - 10 February 1854 Frankfurt) was a German historian of freemasonry.

== Biography ==
Kloss was the son of a physician and studied medicine at Heidelberg and Göttingen, where he became one of the cofounders of the Corps Hannovera Göttingen. He practiced medicine in Frankfurt. He became a book collector, and gathered a fine collection of old manuscripts, purchasing entire libraries of monasteries. Obtaining Masonic degrees, he started collecting books referring to freemasonry. His extensive library of Masonic works is now at The Hague (Cultureel Maçonniek Centrum 'Prins Frederik').

== Works ==
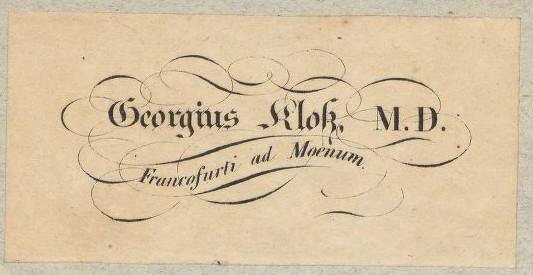
Kloss's ex libris label for his books

His works are fundamental histories of freemasonry, and include:

- Bibliographie der Freimaurerei (“Bibliography of Freemasonry,” 1844; another bibliography appeared in 1846)
- Freimaurerei in ihrer wahren Bedeutung aus den alten und ächten Urkunden (“The true significance of freemasonry taken from old and genuine documents,” 2d ed., 1855)
- Geschichte der Freimaurerei in England, Irland und Schottland (“History of Freemasonry in England, Ireland and Scotland,” 1848)
- Geschichte der Freimaurerei in Frankreich (“History of Freemasonry in France,” 1852–53).
