= Ernest Bolbrinker =

German general during WW2

- Born: 23 October 1898
- Died: 2 July 1962 (aged 63)
- Military career
- Allegiance: German Empire; Weimar Republic; Nazi Germany
- Branch: Army
- Service years: 1916–1920; 1936–1945
- Rank: Generalmajor
- Conflicts: World War II
- Awards: Knight's Cross of the Iron Cross
- Other work: Engineer

Ernest Bolbrinker (23 October 1898 – 2 July 1962) was a general in the Wehrmacht of Nazi Germany during World War II. He was a recipient of the Knight's Cross of the Iron Cross.

== Awards and decorations ==
- Knight's Cross of the Iron Cross on 15 May 1941 as Major and commander of I./Panzer-Regiment 5
