= Walther Herwig =

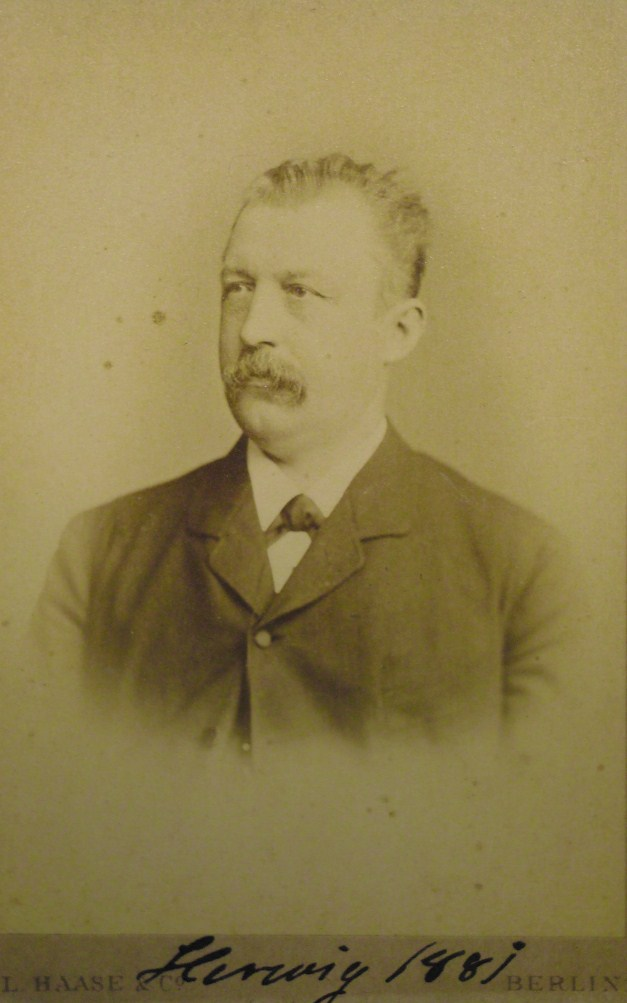
Walther Herwig (1881)

Walther Herwig (February 25, 1838, Bad Arolsen, Waldeck – December 16, 1912) was a Prussian administrative lawyer, and the founder of the German fisheries science.

Herwig studied jurisprudence at the University of Göttingen from 1856, where he became a member of the Corps Hannovera. He continued his studies at the universities of Leipzig, Freiburg and Berlin, before entering the Prussian civil service. In 1869 he became district officer for his hometown of Arolsen. He was vice-president of the Provincial Training and Medical College Association in Berlin. From 1879 to 1893 he belonged to the Prussian Lower House. Herwig received his habilitation from the University of Kiel in 1896. He was appointed as a senior government advice in Hanover until his retirement in 1907, when he returned to Berlin.

Amongst his other work in the civil service, Herwig promoted the development of a German high seas fishing industry. To this end, in 1880 the first German research vessel was built. This ship, named the President Herwig, was lost in 1898 on the coast of Iceland. Herwig used this event to propose a restructuring of the German high sea fishing fleet, and in particular for social support for the crews of the ships and action to maintain a supply of appropriately trained manpower to the industry. From 1902 until 1908 Herwig was appointed President of the Central Committee for the International Exploration of the Sea, the body that went on to become the modern day International Council for the Exploration of the Sea (ICES).

At present the main German research vessel operating in the North Atlantic and North Sea is known as the Walther Herwig III.
