= Richard Hansen (horticulturist) =

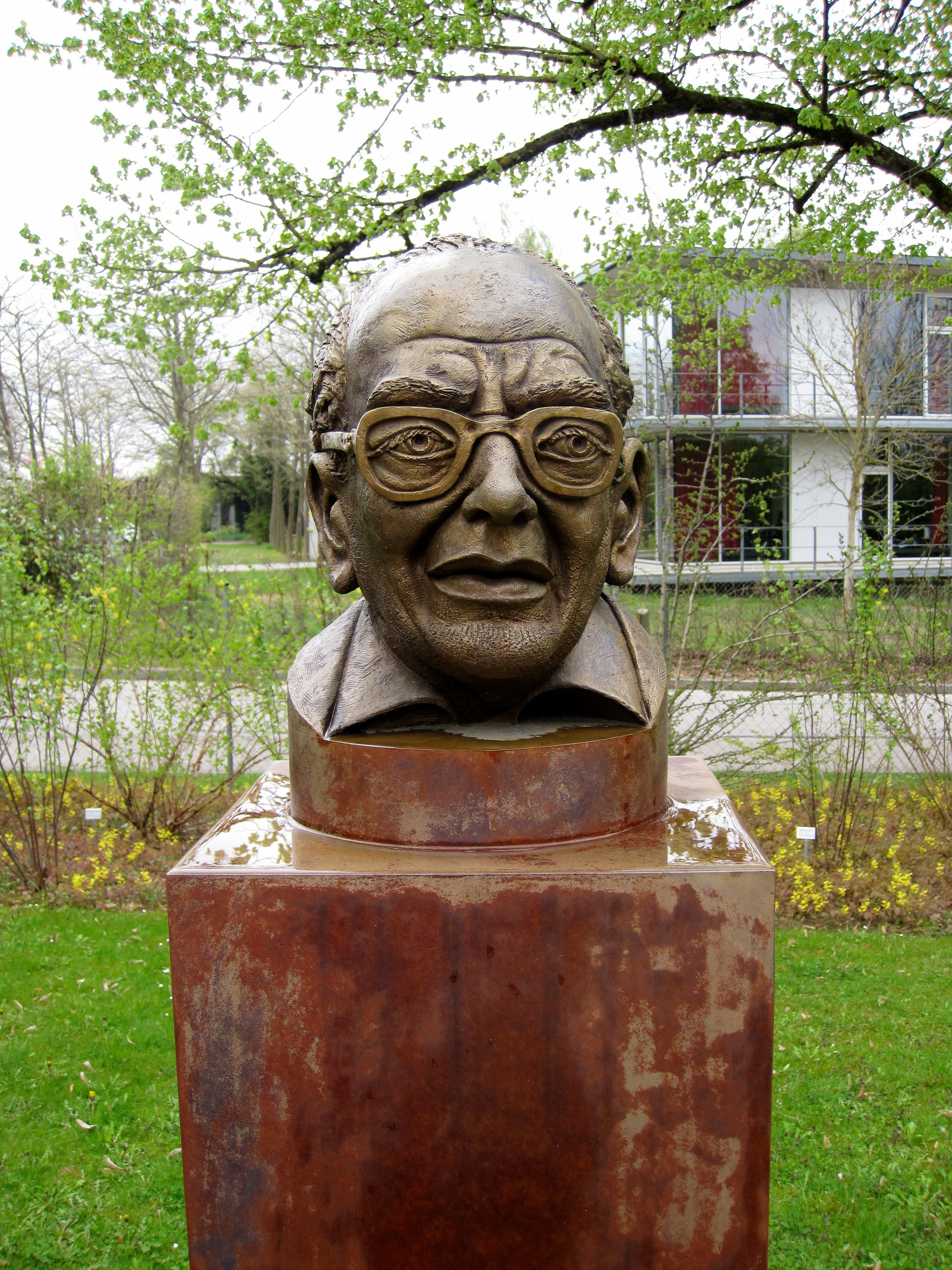
A bust of Hansen at the Sichtungsgarten Weihenstephan

Richard Hansen (1912 – 2001) was a German horticulturist. Working at Weihenstephan, Hansen devised and popularised the idea of using artificial plant communities in planting design. He founded the Sichtungsgarten Weihenstephan, where he conducted trials of herbaceous perennials to evaluate their potential for use in gardens and public green spaces.

== Early career and family ==
Hansen was born in Nortorf on 10 July 1912. From 1932 to 1934 he was an apprentice at a tree nursery in Rellingen. Afterwards, until 1936, he worked as an assistant successively to horticulturists Wilhelm Pfitzer in Stuttgart and Karl Foerster in Potsdam-Bornim. From 1936 to 1939 he studied horticulture at the Humboldt University in Berlin and also took up art history and plant sociology courses. In 1940 he married Renate von Wilmovsky, with whom he had two sons, born in 1942 and 1944.

In addition to Foerster, Hansen learned from landscape architect Hermann Mattern and phytosociologist Reinhold Tüxen. During the Second World War, Hansen worked under Tüxen at the Agency for Theoretical and Applied Plant Sociology (Arbeitsstelle für theoretische und angewandte Pflanzensoziologie) in Hanover. From 1945 to 1947, he was Tüxen's assistant at Central Office for Vegetation Mapping (Zentralstelle für Vegetationskartierung) in Stolzenau.

== Perennial trials ==
Foerster, who was the leading expert in the horticultural field of herbaceous perennials, was left stranded behind the Iron Curtain after the war, and it was Hansen who took over from him. In 1947, Hansen began his career at the State Teaching and Research Institute for Horticulture (Staatliche Lehr- und Forschungsanstalt für Gartenbau) in Weihenstephan as a plant science lecturer. The same year he established a trial garden known as the Sichtungsgarten Weihenstephan. At the Sichtungsgarten, Hansen conducted testings of herbaceous perennials and their suitability to garden cultivation. The Institut für Stauden, Gehölze und angewandte Pflanzensociologie (Institute for Perennials, Shrubs and Applied Plant Sociology) was established on Hansen's initiative in 1948. In 1949 he started teaching at the Technische Hochschule München-Weihenstephan as well.

Hansen adopted the principle of Bodenständigkeit (down-to-earthedness), which was introduced into planting design by landscape architect Alwin Seifert in the early 20th century and originally strongly favored native plants. Hansen, however, sought to include foreign species to create artificial plant communities. His main goal was to propose design solutions that required minimal maintenance. Having formulated the garden habitats theory, Hansen compiled lists of plant associations suitable for garden cultivation involving both indigenous and exotic species. His approach attracted so much interest in Germany and abroad that his 1981 book, Die Stauden und ihre Lebensbereiche, was translated into English under the title Perennials and their Garden Habitats in 1993.

== Retirement ==
Hansen retired in 1977. He received numerous honors, including the Karl Foerster Ring (1972), Georg Arends Memorial Medal (1983), the Federal Cross of Merit (1983), the Friedrich Ludwig von Sckell Ring of Honor (1986), as well as the honorary membership of the German Society for Garden Art and Landscape Culture (1987). He died on 18 August 2001 in Freising-Weihenstephan.
