= Richard Hansen =

Richard Hansen may refer to:

- Richard Hansen (horticulturist), German horticulturist
- Rick Hansen (born 1957), Canadian paraplegic athlete, activist and philanthropist
- Richard D. Hansen, American archaeologist

== See also ==
- Rick Hansen (politician) (born 1963), Minnesota state representative
- Richard Hanson (disambiguation)
