= Richard Hanson =

Richard Hanson may refer to:

- Richard Hanson (Canadian politician) (1879–1948), Canadian politician
- Richard Hanson (bishop) (1916–1988), bishop of Clogher in the Church of Ireland, 1970–1973
- Richard Hanson (Australian politician) (1805–1876), British-Australian chief justice of South Australia
- Richard H. Hanson (1931-2023), American politician
- Richard Hanson (Missouri politician), American politician, secretary of state of Missouri in 1994
- Richard Winfield Hanson, American biochemist, academic and university professor

== See also ==
- Richard Hansen (disambiguation)
- Richard Hanson Weightman (1816–1861), delegate to the United States Congress from the Territory of New Mexico
