= Sichtungsgarten Weihenstephan =

Teaching and trial garden in Freising, Germany

Coordinates: 48°24′02.72″N 11°43′44.37″E

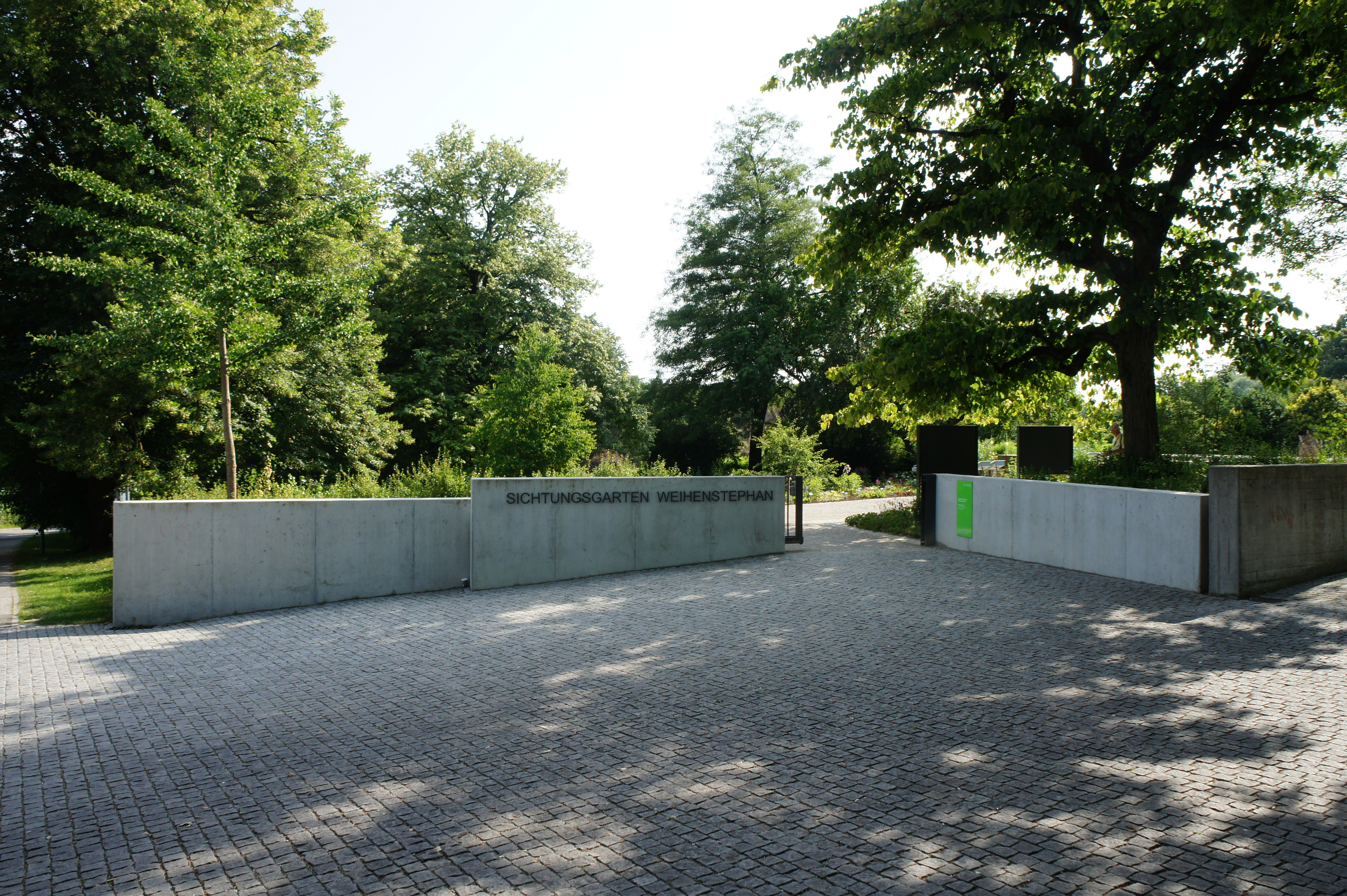
- Interactive map of Sichtungsgarten Weihenstephan
- Type: Trial garden, teaching garden
- Location: Weihenstephan, Freising, Bavaria, Germany
- Area: Over 5 hectares (12 acres)
- Created: 1947
- Designer: Richard Hansen
- Administrator: Weihenstephan-Triesdorf University of Applied Science
- Open: 1 April to 31 October, 9:00 to 18:00

The Sichtungsgarten Weihenstephan (German pronunciation: [ˈzɪçtʊŋsɡaʁ.tən]; lit. 'Viewing Garden' or 'Sighting Garden') is a teaching and trial garden maintained by the Weihenstephan-Triesdorf University of Applied Science in Freising, Germany. It is, according to the English horticulturist Noel Kingsbury, the leading research and teaching garden in Europe. The institution is funded by the state of Bavaria along with four other gardens, known together as the Weihenstephan Gardens, and covers an area of over 5 hectares (12 acres).

The Sichtungsgarten Weihenstephan was founded in 1947 under the leadership of horticulturist Richard Hansen. It is used for testing the suitability of plants for cultivation in gardens and urban green spaces as well as their mutual compatibility and planting design possibilities. Although shrubs and in particular garden roses are also tested, the focus of the Sichtungsgarten is on the trialling of herbaceous perennials, which are arranged into long beds. It also contains a large rock garden, a pond, a pool, and shaded areas.

The garden displays contrasting and harmonious color schemes as well as monochromatic herbaceous borders, but is chiefly notable for researching and exhibiting Hansen's philosophy of designed plant communities, which calls for matching plants with those from the same habitat type. Low-maintenance and drought-tolerant compositions, featuring plants such as ornamental grasses, daisies, catmint, sages, and spurges, are particularly emphasized, but the garden also maintains a large collection of traditional garden plants such as lilies and peonies.

== Development ==
=== 20th century ===
Horticulturist Karl Foerster called for the establishment of trial gardens in Germany as early as 1920, but initial attempts failed due to the Second World War. Foerster's student Richard Hansen succeeded in establishing a trial garden at Weihenstephan in the Bavarian municipality of Freising in 1947. The Institut für Stauden, Gehölze und angewandte Pflanzensociologie (transl. Institute for Perennials, Shrubs and Applied Plant Sociology) followed in 1948. Hansen described the garden's purpose as:

... selecting the best breeds and species worthy of cultivation, but also ... determining the right planting location for each plant and thus, especially from an ecological point of view, suitable partners and neighbors for good community relationships at the planting site.

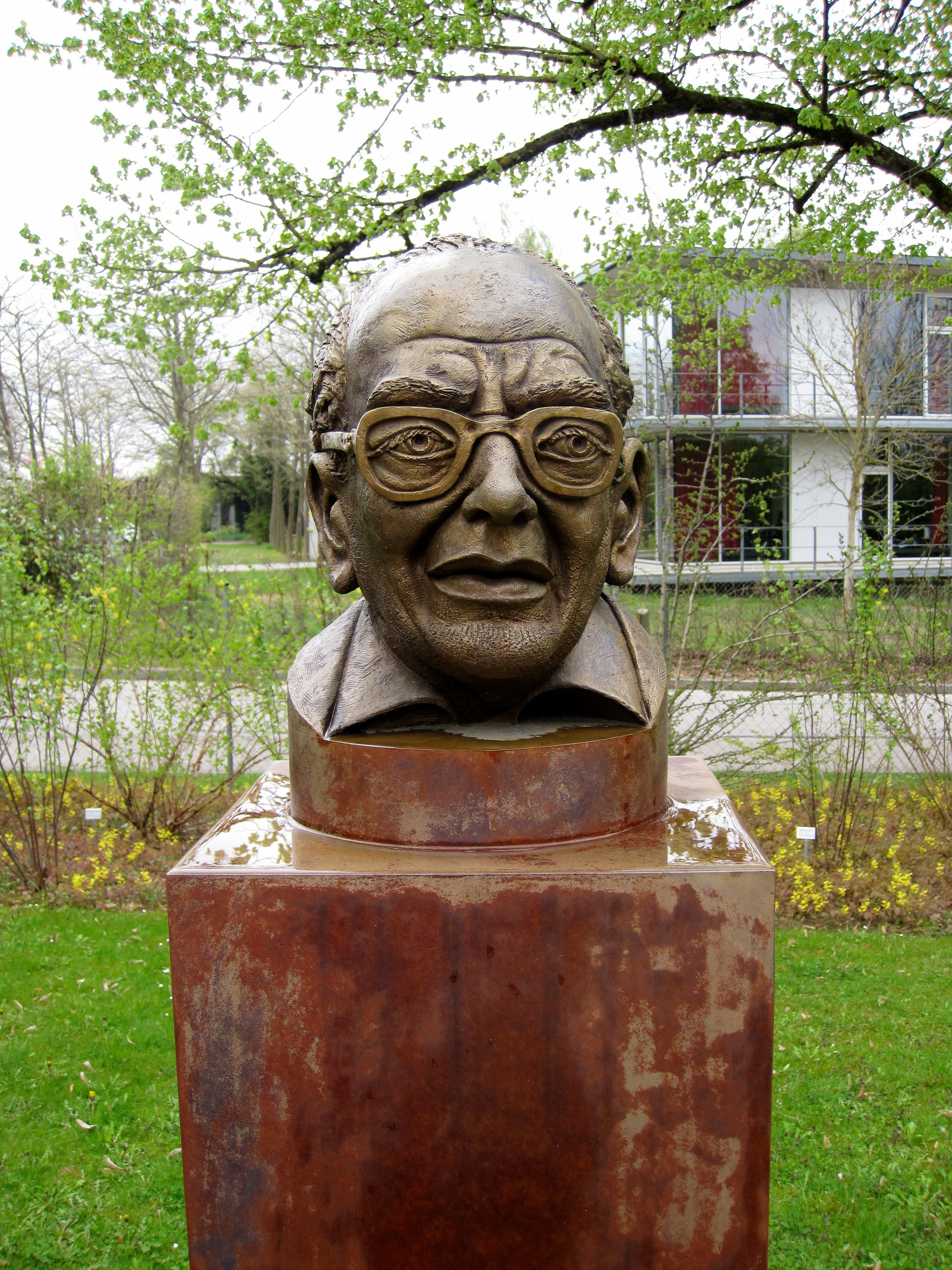
A bust of the Sichtungsgarten's founder, Richard Hansen, is placed near the garden entrance.

Hansen sought to understand how different plants could be combined into designed plant communities with the goal of proposing low-maintenance solutions for urban green spaces. These efforts are evident in Weihenstephan's strong bias towards labor-efficient and naturalistic planting. Hansen managed the Sichtungsgarten until 1978, when it passed into the care of Peter Kiermeier. Hansen was primarily concerned with the sustainability of the plantings; emphasis on plant form, color, and texture was a secondary development. In 1981 Hansen, together with Friedrich Stahl, summarized the findings from Weihenstephan in a book titled Die Stauden und ihre Lebensbereiche, which was translated into English as Perennials and their Garden Habitats in 1993. Bernd Hertle took over the Sichtungsgarten in 2006.

=== 21st century ===
The Sichtungsgarten is today part of a group of gardens called the Weihenstephan Gardens (Weihenstephaner Gärten). These gardens are affiliated with the Weihenstephan-Triesdorf University of Applied Science (HSWT) and funded by the state of Bavaria. The number of personnel tending to the gardens was reduced by nearly 30% in the 2000s and 2010s as a result of the austerity policy of the Bavarian government. In 2022 the gardens had a budget of over €1 million and twenty people were employed.

Since the late 2010s, professional and recreational gardening associations have voiced concerns that the austerity policy might lead to a deterioration of the Weihenstephan Gardens. Fifteen such associations appealed to the Bavarian State Parliament and the university, asking that the gardens be sufficiently and sustainably staffed and financed. Hertle resigned as the garden's director in March 2022 in protest against the proposal of the president of HSWT, Eric Veulliet, that the garden be funded through private sponsorship, fearing such dependency.

Swantje Duthweiler became the new director in November 2023. She announced in 2024 that structural changes would be made to the Weihenstephan Gardens. The Sichtungsgarten is to be modernized by being gradually "built upon". A greater emphasis is to be placed on drought-resistant plants, and hedges, roof gardens, green walls, and rain gardens are also to be developed.

== Uses ==
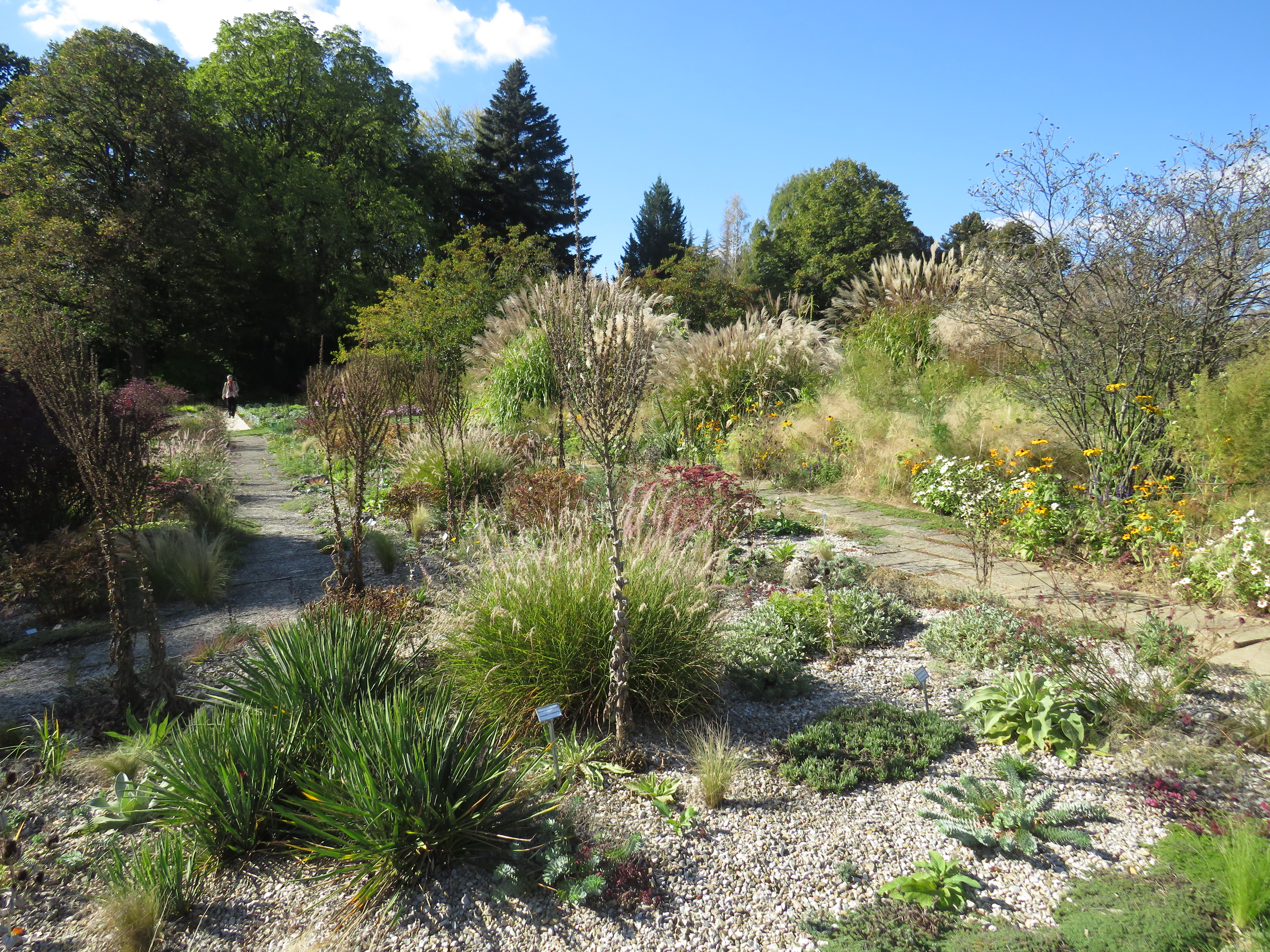
The trialing of xerophiles in the gravel garden, September 2018

The task set out by Hansen continues to shape the Sichtungsgarten; today the garden is used for testing the cultivation suitability, mutual compatibility, and aesthetic properties of thousands of herbaceous perennials, shrubs, and new cultivars of garden roses. There is a special focus on creating attractive combinations of herbaceous perennials according to their habitat types. Prairie-style plantings are a primary focus of testing. Perennial forbs are trialled for their ability to compete with aggressive grasses. Other trials seek to understand how various survival strategies in plants may translate to their use in a garden setting; or to compare the efficiency of different labor-saving maintenance regimes.

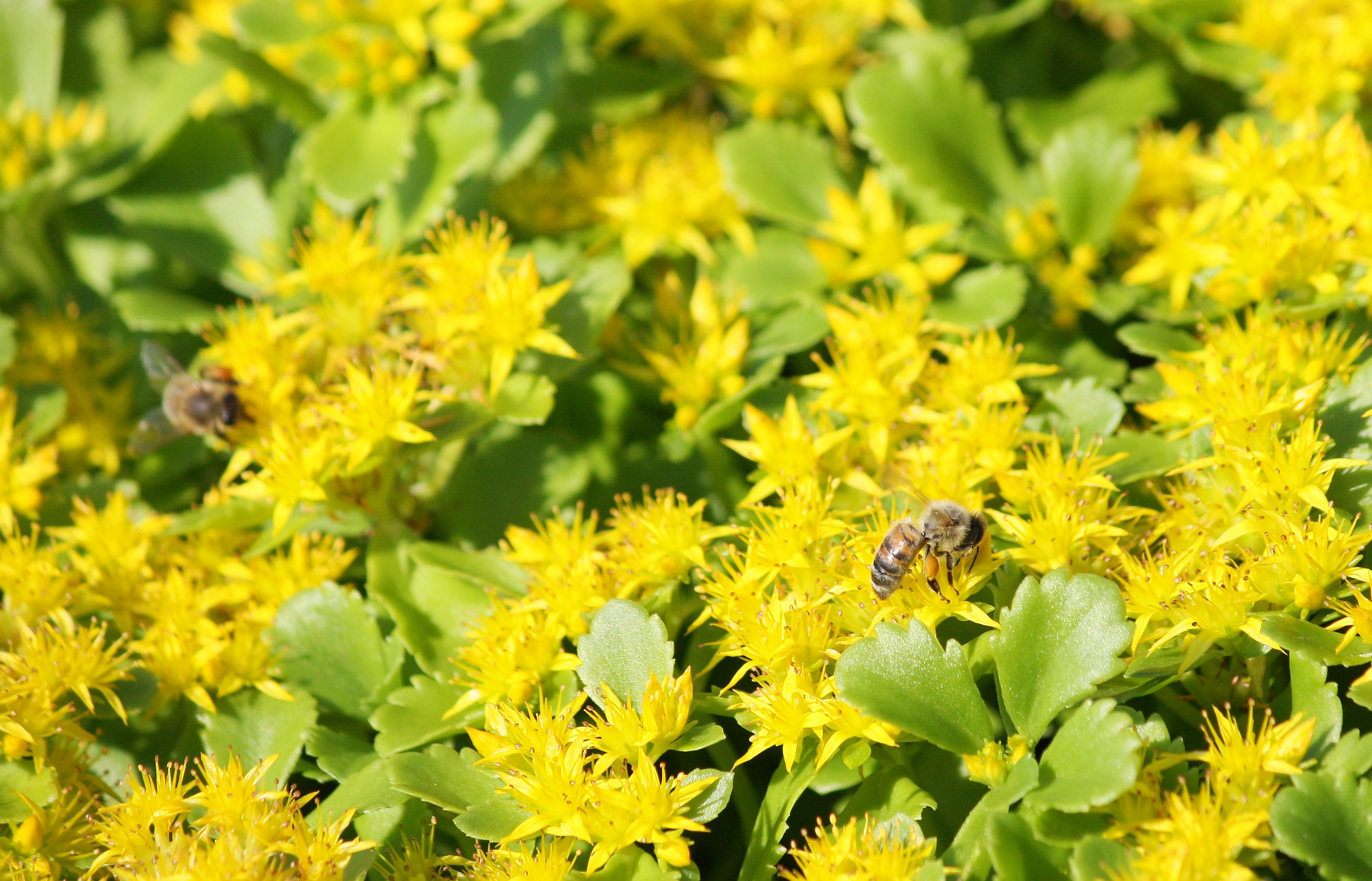
Sedum kamtschaticum 'Weihenstephaner Gold' was selected at the Sichtungsgarten in the 1950s.

Most of the research work supporting Germany's ecological planting style comes from Weihenstephan. The horticulturist Charles Quest-Ritson describes the Sichtungsgarten Weihenstephan as "the leading station in the country for horticultural trials of any kind". According to the garden designer Noel Kingsbury, the Sichtungsgarten is "Europe's leading research and teaching garden" and "a unique institution, with no real equivalent in the English-speaking world". Kingsbury notes that the trialing process at Weihenstephan is thorough and consequently slow; he finds the process at RHS Garden Wisley to be "amateurish" in comparison, but concedes that it allows far more plants to be trialled.

The Sichtungsgarten's role as a research and teaching garden is emphasized by the arrangement of plants into long experimental beds. Students are expected not just to identify the plants and their features but also to consider how the plants may be combined for use in public and private planting schemes. Kingsbury finds youthfulness and liveliness to be the garden's shaping qualities and attributes them to the presence of students and visitors.

The garden is open to the public from 1 April to 31 October, 9:00 - 18:00, including weekends and public holidays. The entry is free of charge. Dogs are not allowed. 90-minute guided tours are offered from May to October. Trial results are made available to the public online.

== Composition ==
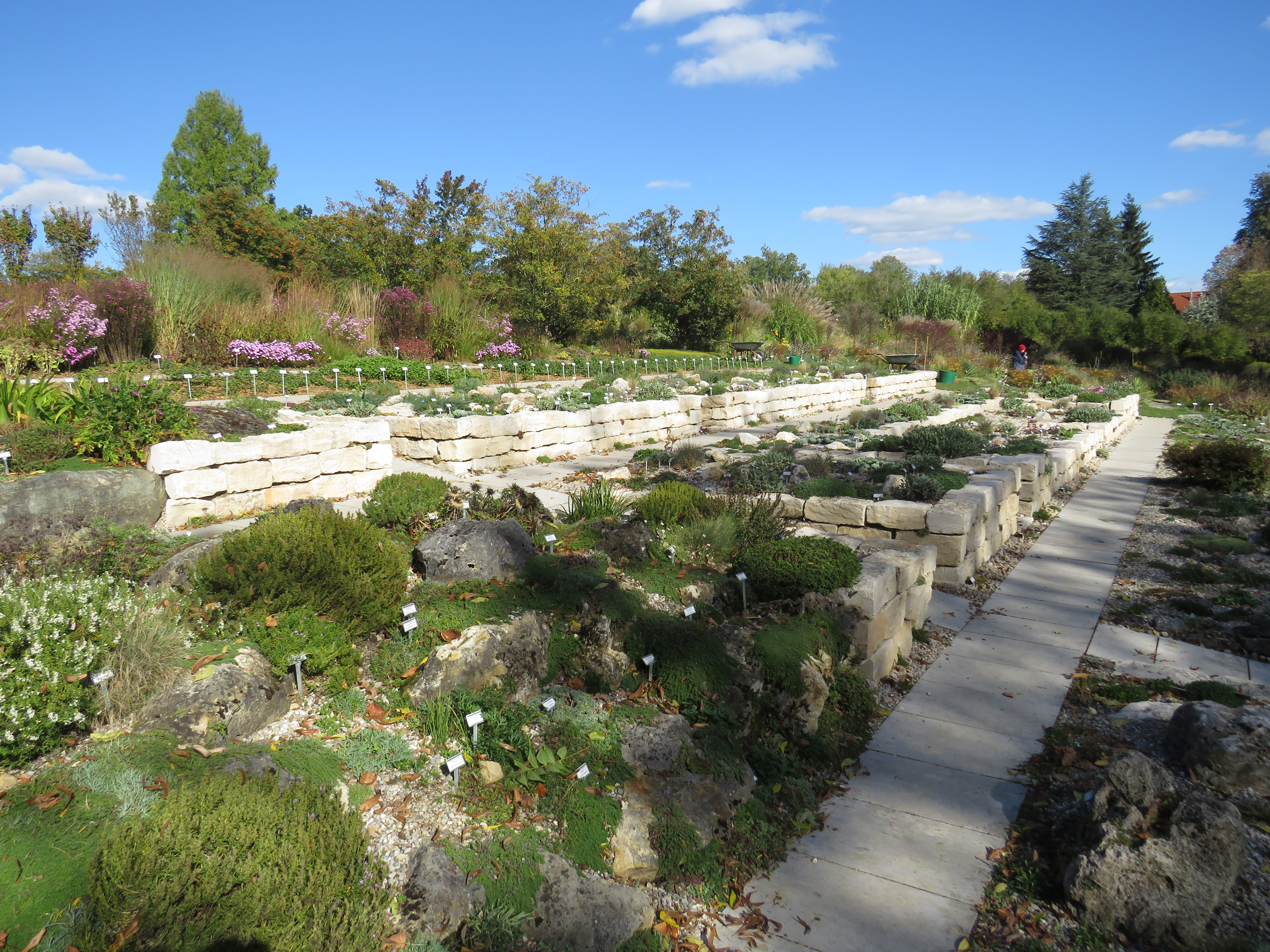
Rockery terraces, September 2018

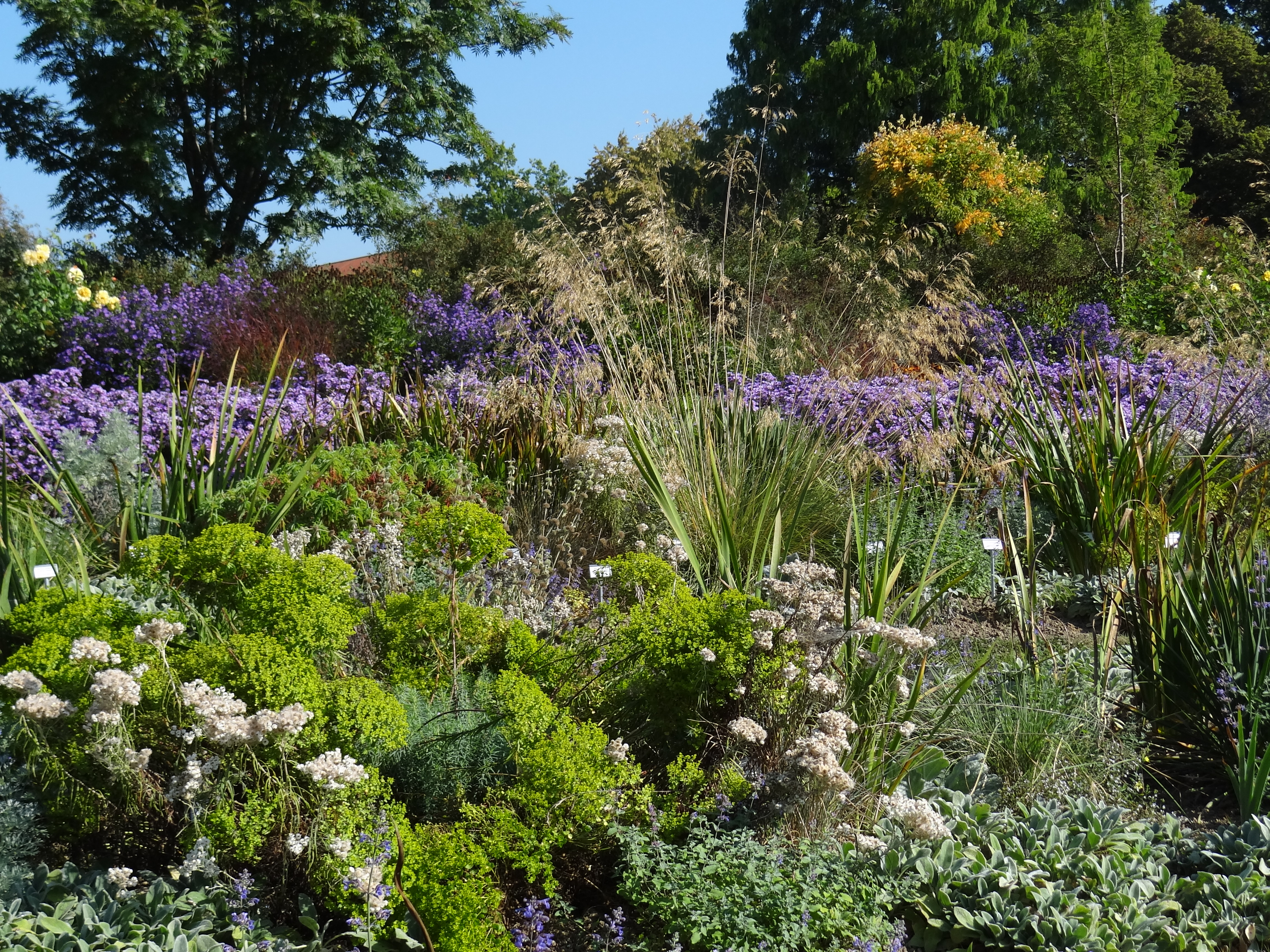
A prairie-style planting, September 2016

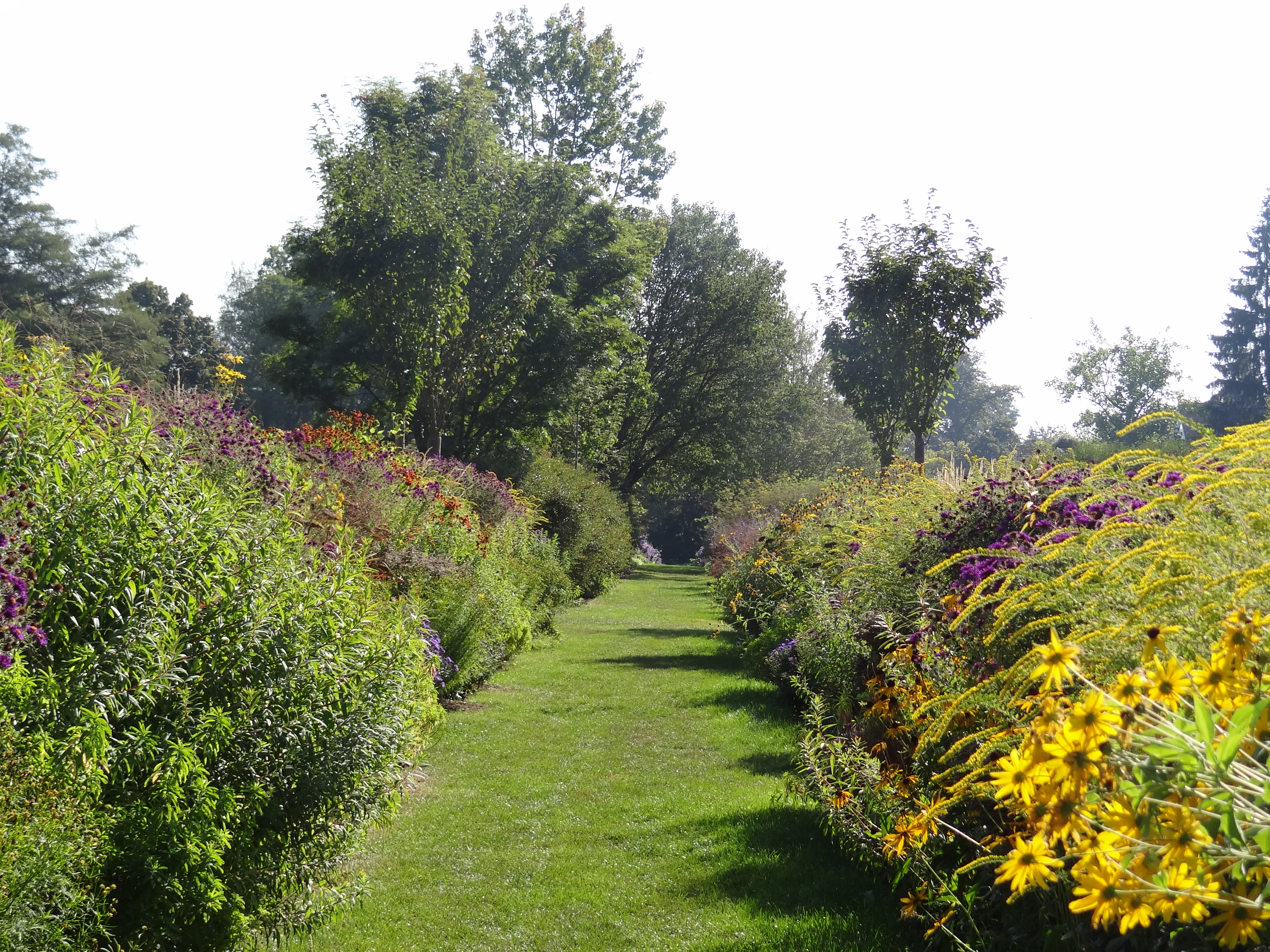
Borders featuring tall forbs, September 2016

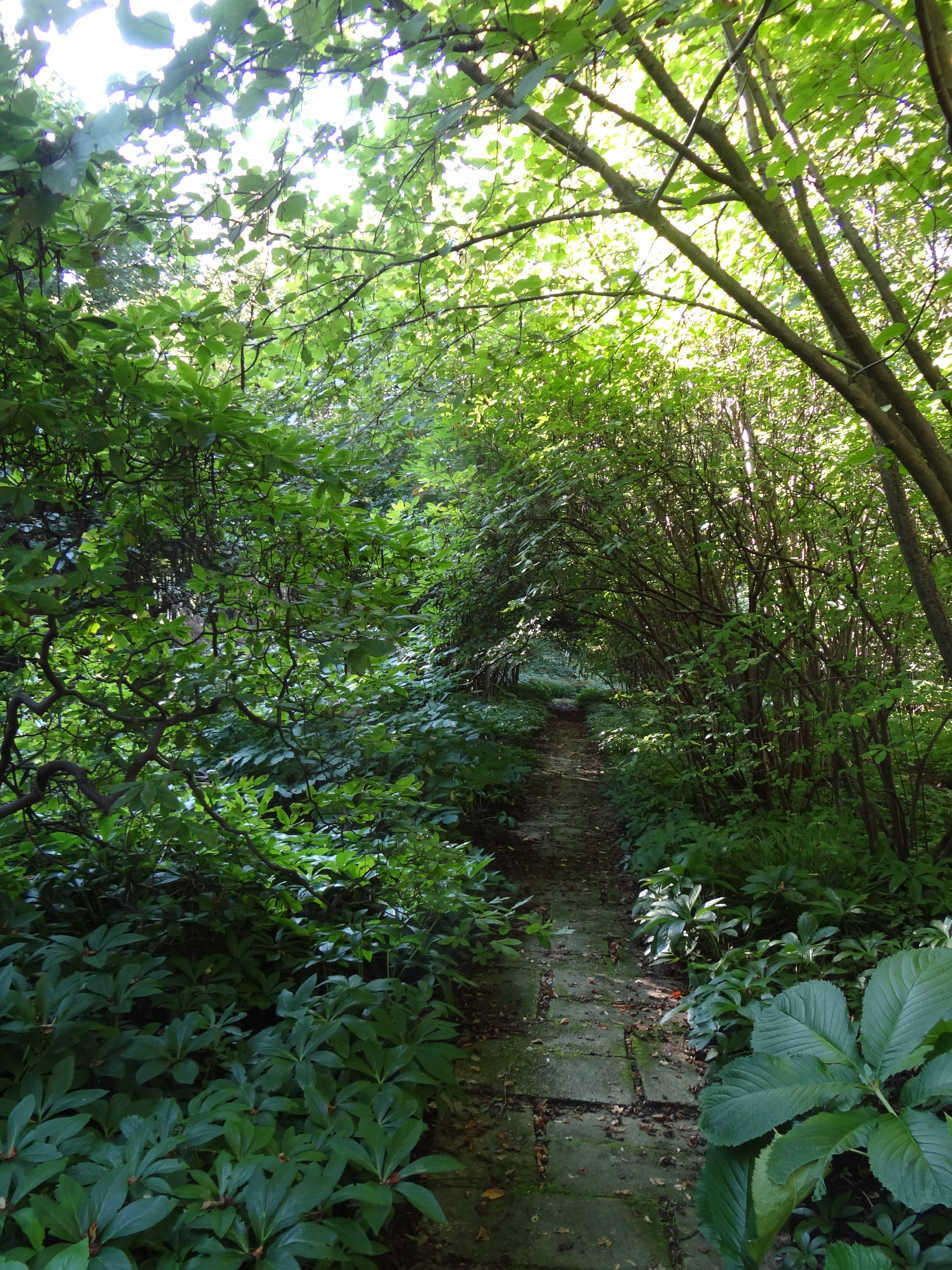
A shady border, 2016

The Sichtungsgarten covers an area of over 5 hectares (12 acres). The south-facing slope features steppe species arranged in the fashion of a heathland as well as rock gardens, a pond, and a pool. Shrubs, with a diverse herbaceous understory, dominate the western part of the garden. Large areas are devoted to plants suitable for poor, dry soils. The shaded areas feature a variety of groundcover plants, which are grown primarily for their foliage.

The main focus of the Sichtungsgarten Weihenstephan are herbaceous perennials. According to Kingsbury, the garden's assortment of ornamental perennials is the largest in the world. Herbaceous borders occupy the center of the garden. Most perennials are in multiples, distinguishing the garden from an exhibition ground or a plant collection. The herbaceous borders are infused with half-hardy tropical species such as Canna and Ricinus communis. While the perennials, particularly the ornamental grasses, provide continuity, the half-hardy species are used for structure throughout summer months and may be changed every year to trial new color and form combinations.

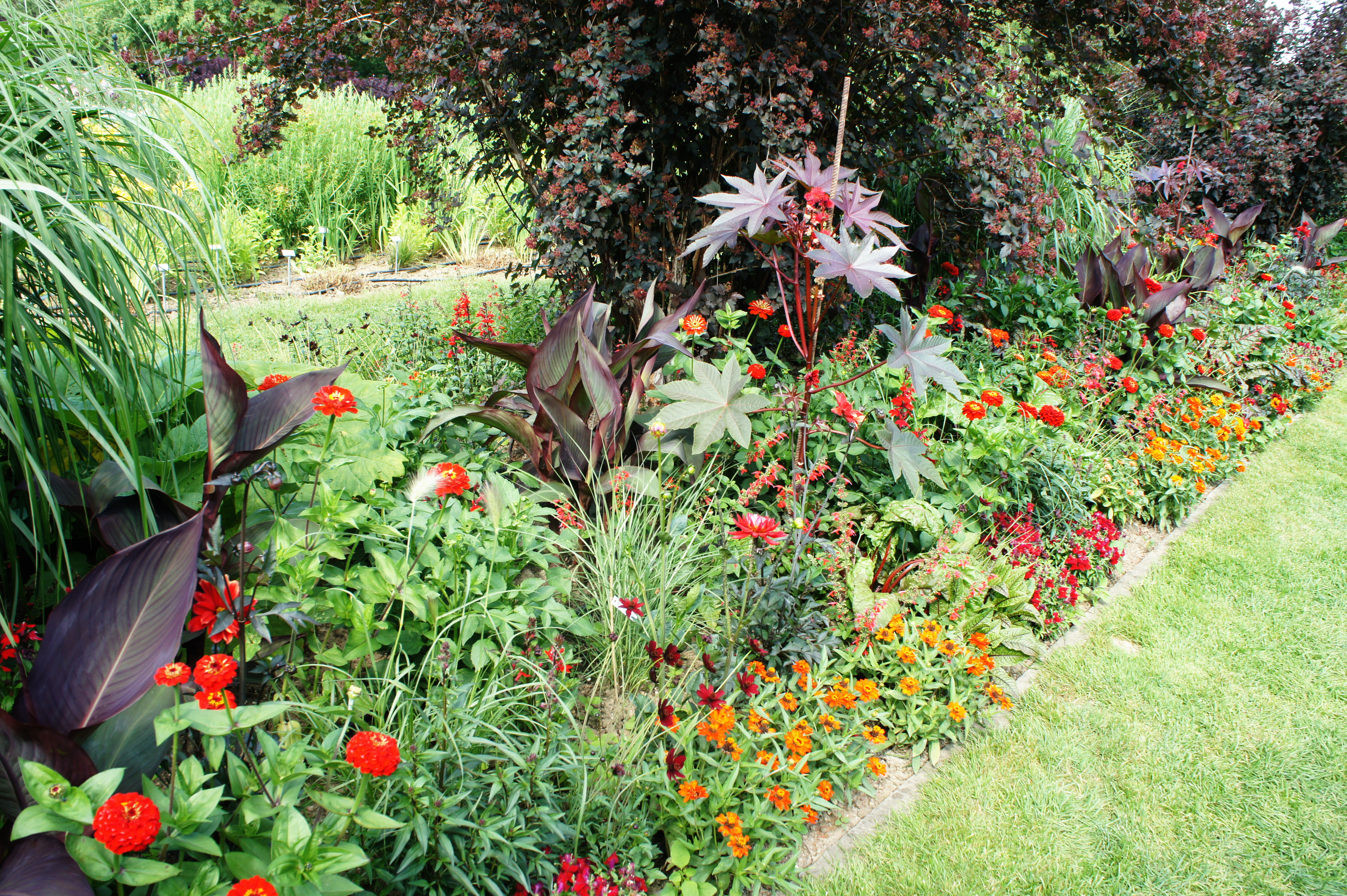
The 'Red Border', featuring Canna, Physocarpus, Ricinus, and Dahlia cultivars, among others, in July 2013

Contrasting or harmonious patterns are formed by combining different colors, textures, structures, and growth forms of foliage and flowers. Kingsbury finds the color scheme to be inspired by the designs of Gertrude Jekyll. The combinations range from complementary, such as orange Tropaeolum and purple Buddleia cultivars, to more analogous, such as orange Lilium and yellow Kniphofia, Eremurus, and Euphorbia cultivars set against grey-blue grasses and Nepeta planting. The Sichtungsgarten primarily displays combinations of colors and textures typical of various habitats, evoking the founder's belief in designing plant communities, but artistic compositions can also be found, including the 'Red Border', which contains only plants with flowers in the various shades of red.

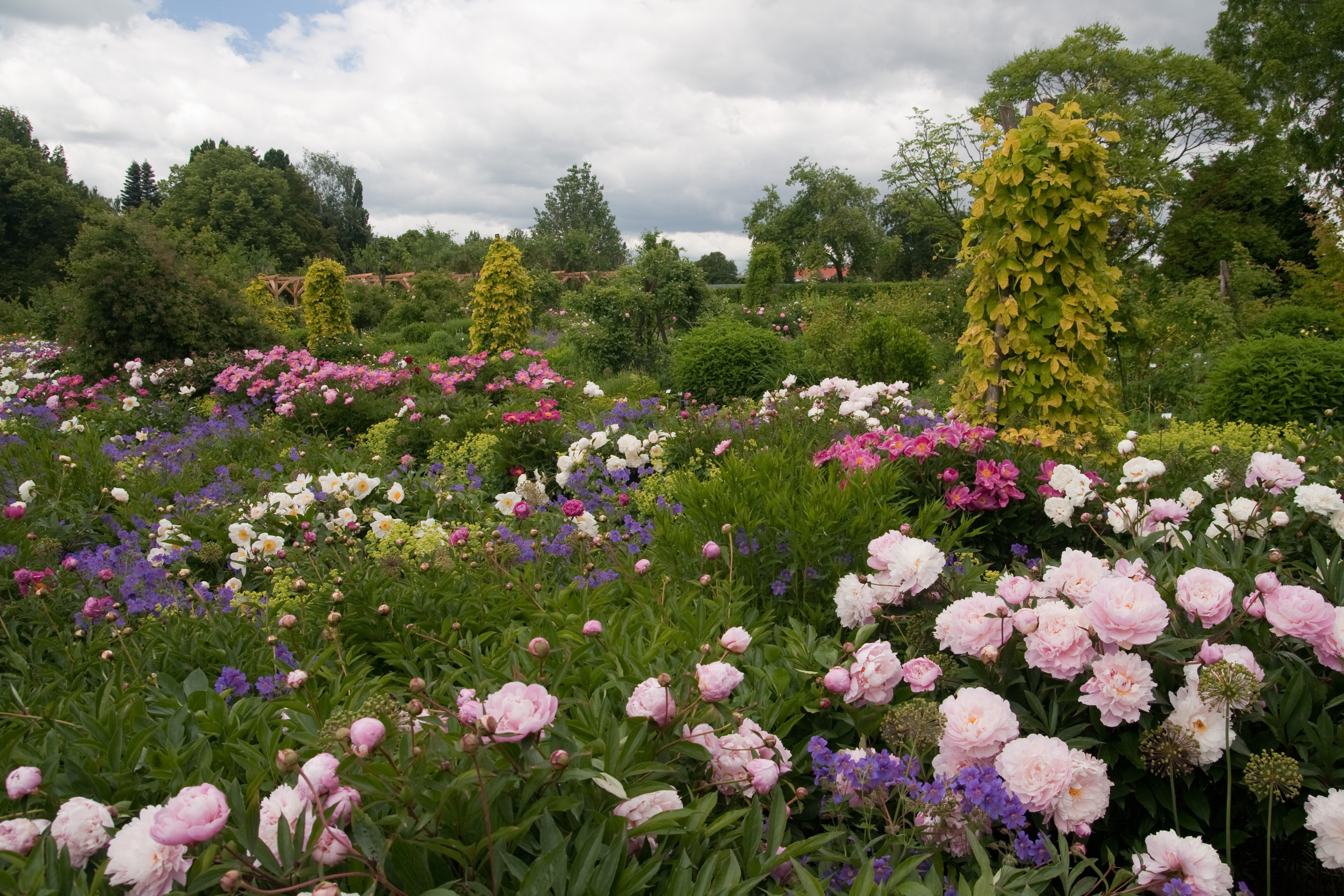
The paeony collection in May 2009

The Sichtungsgarten contains a large collection of Paeonia and Hemerocallis species and cultivars, as well as other plants which require high maintenance when used in mass plantings, such as those in the Delphinium and Lilium genera. Hansen included these out of recognition of their historical and sentimental value. The first paeonies were planted in the 1950s, and some have surpassed the age of 60. According to Kingsbury, however, the garden's aim is to direct the visitors' attention to plants that thrive in public space with minimal care, such as ornamental grasses, Leucanthemum species, and xerophilic Salvia species. Dwarf Aster dumosus cultivars, used for filling in gaps and smothering weeds, are some of the prominent subjects that used to be more popular garden plants in the past.

== Affiliated gardens ==
The Sichtungsgarten is part of a group of HSWT-affiliated gardens known as the Weihenstephan Gardens (Weihenstephaner Gärten). The other gardens in this group are:

- The Allotment Garden (Kleingarten), where research is carried out on the cultivation of vegetables and herbs. These include traditional and forgotten species as well as novel varieties. Spices and medicinal herbs are also grown. The Allotment Garden encompasses a fruit show garden, which contains berry- and pome-bearing species; special attention is paid to small varieties suitable for urban gardening.
- The Court Garden (Hofgarten), which is built on the site of the former cloister garden of the Weihenstephan Abbey. It features stately trees such as purple beech, ginkgo, silver maple, gingerbread tree, and magnolias. The garden was redesigned multiple times. In its center is an imposing Baroque pavillon. Its present appearance dates from the 1950s. The Alps can be observed from the western terrace.
- The Parterre Garden (Parterregarten), which is modern in design and features clipped yew and barberry hedges. The formal hedges are interspersed with free-flowing herbaceous plantings which include perennials with a long season of interest (e.g. Rudbeckia fulgida var. deamii, Bistorta amplexicaulis, Hakonechloa macra) and ornamental grasses (e.g. Calamagrostis x acutiflora 'Karl Foerster'), as well as geophytes.
- The Oberdieck Garden (Oberdieckgarten), which was a part of the Court Garden until their separation by the construction of a building in 1925. It is named after the fruit researcher Johann Georg Conrad Oberdieck. The garden is divided into terraces and rectangular borders with different themes. It contains hybrid peonies; temperate orchids; roses, fragrant, and medicinal plants; mountain laurel and azaleas with a herbaceous understory; and hydrangeas with their own herbaceous understory.
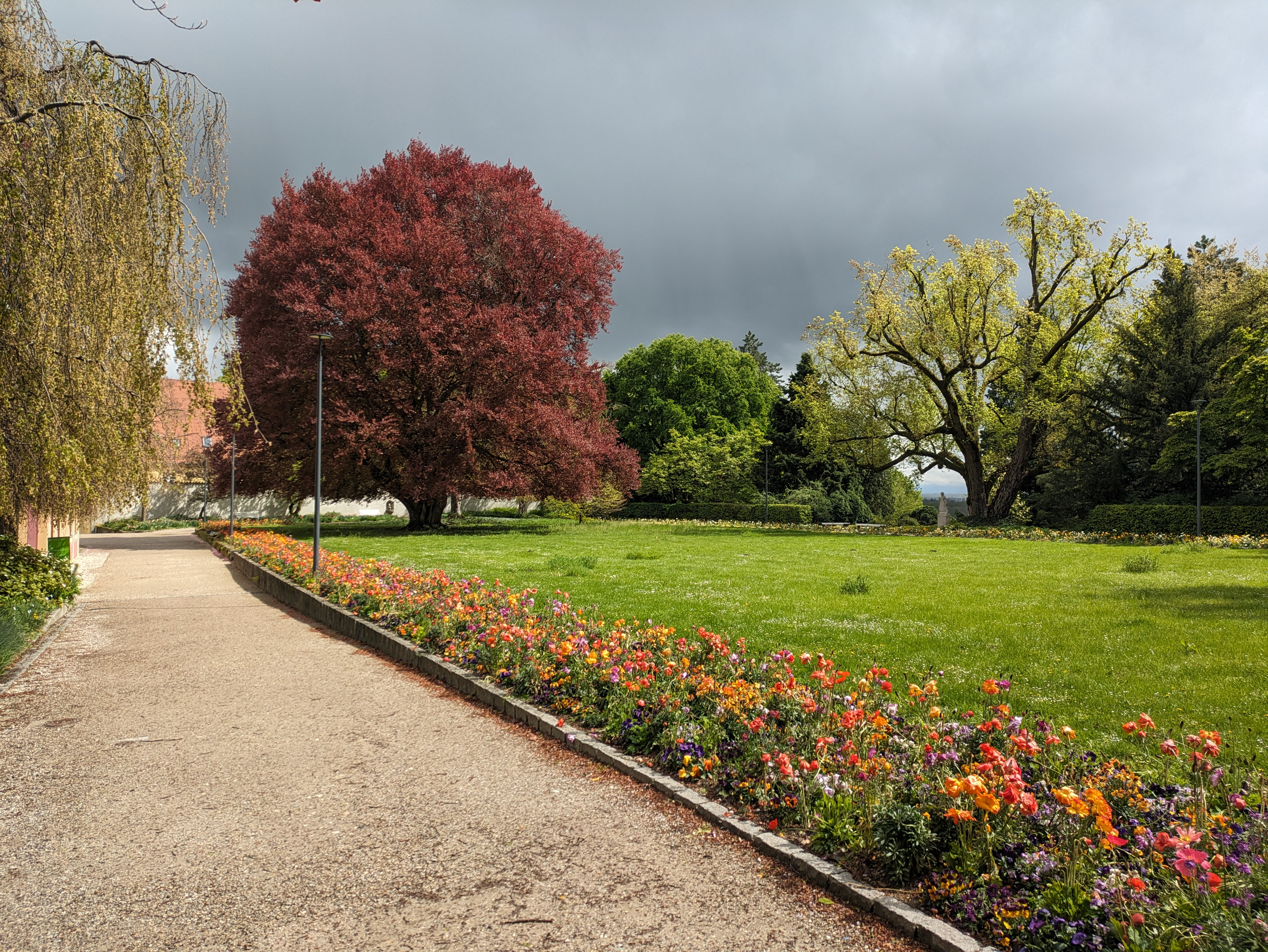
The Court Garden, April 2024

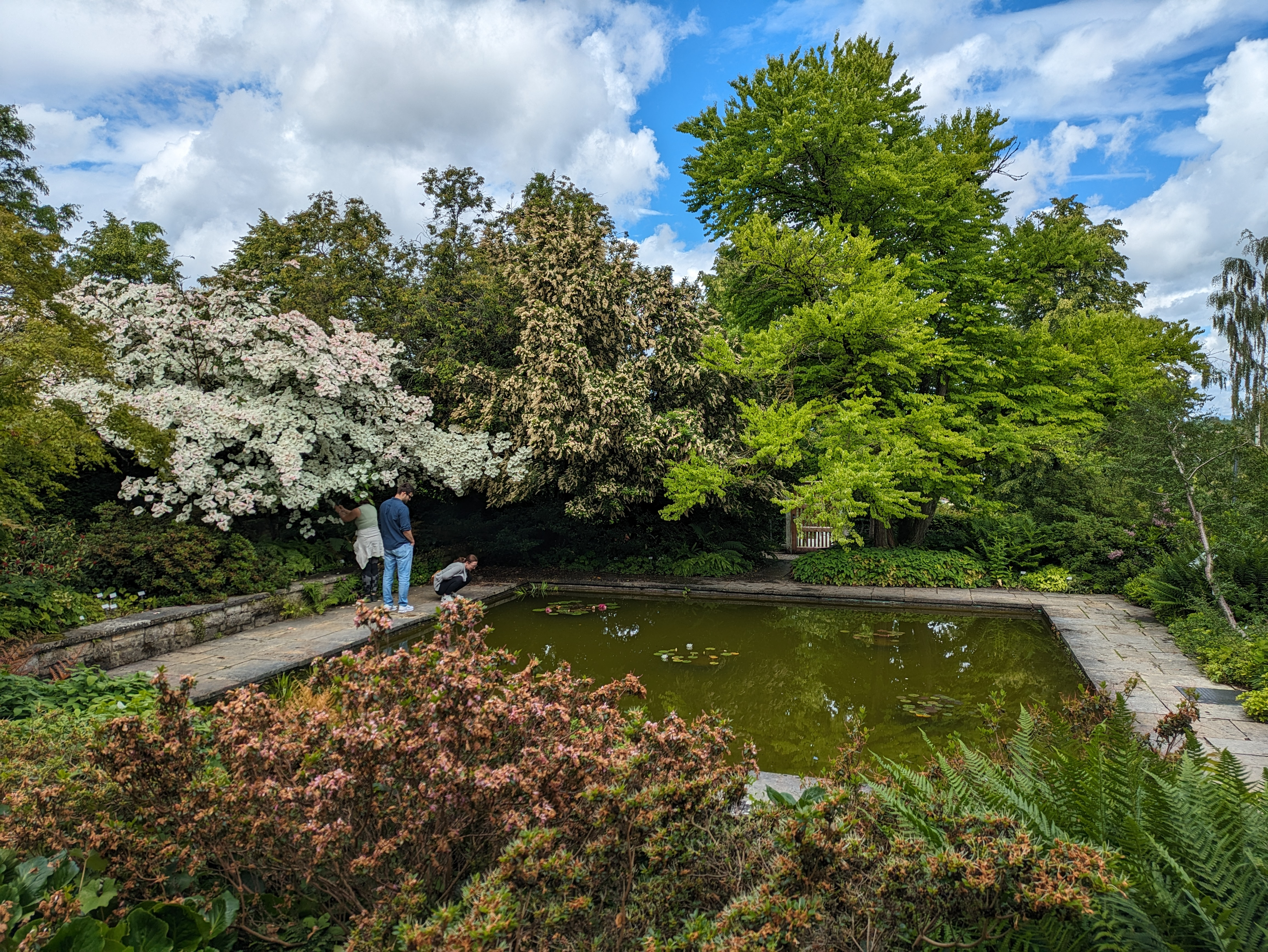
The Oberdieck Garden, May 2024

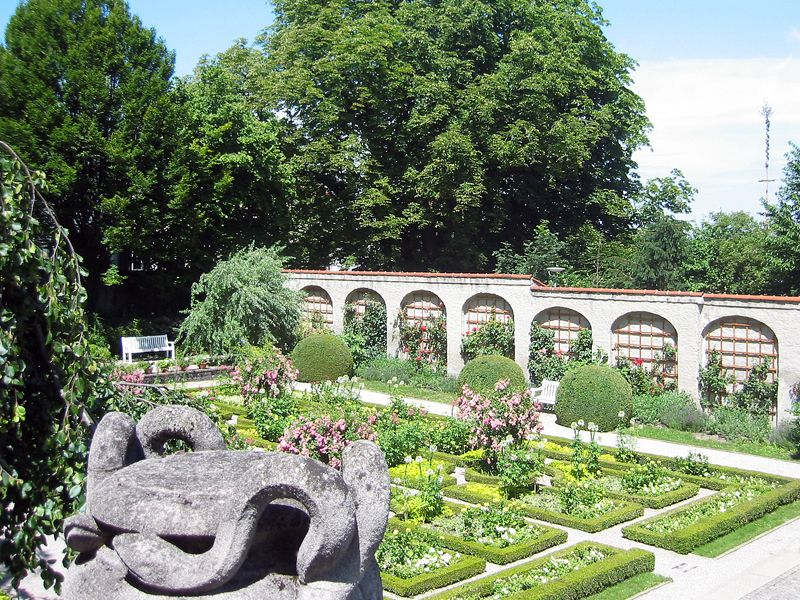
The Parterre Garden, July 2007

Richard Hansen's ideas were introduced by his student Urs Walser at the Schau- und Sichtungsgarten Hermannshof near Heidelberg in the 1980s, and continue to be developed by Walser's successor, Cassian Schmidt, who also trained at Weihenstephan.

== See also ==
- List of botanical gardens in Germany
