= Schifferer =

Schifferer is a surname. Notable people with the name include:

- Andreas Schifferer (born 1974), Austrian alpine skier
- Anton Schifferer (1871–1943), German businessman and politician
