= Renee Shepherd =

American gardener and writer

Renee Shepherd is a gardening entrepreneur and writer known for heirloom seed advocacy and garden-based cooking using home-grown herbs. Better Homes and Gardens called her "a groundbreaking gardener", and Businessweek a "pioneering innovator" who helped popularize specialty vegetables and cottage garden flowers for home gardening and gourmet restaurants.

== Seed companies ==
Shepherd earned a doctorate from the University of California, Santa Cruz in the early 1980s. While teaching environmental studies, she met a Dutch seed dealer who encouraged her interest in seed varieties. She began her own seed distribution company in 1983. Shepherd's Garden Seeds was a small mail-order seed company specializing in uncommon vegetable and flower seeds. In 1988, the business was purchased by White Flower Farm, a larger mail-order nursery in Litchfield, Connecticut, which eventually closed it. Anne Raver, a gardening writer for The New York Times, cited the sale as an example of "an increasingly familiar story … : a small specialty nursery known for unique plants is bought by a larger company hoping to take advantage of its cutting-edge appeal and to get new plants for mass marketing. What ensues is invariably a loss of diversity … and, often, a loss of the vision that made the nursery attractive to begin with." In 1997, Shepherd went on to start a new business, Renee's Garden Seeds, based in Felton, California. In 2006, Renee's Garden Seeds were sold at 900 retail outlets in the United States, with 250 varieties of flowers, vegetables and herbs. In 2011, 2.5 million seed packets representing more than 400 varieties were sold online and at 1,500 garden centers in the United States and Canada.

== Publications and other work ==
Shepherd is known for writing her own plant descriptions and growing information for her catalogues and seed packets. She has published two cookbooks (Recipes from a Kitchen Garden and More Recipes from a Kitchen Garden), as well as numerous articles in food, gardening, and lifestyle periodicals. She maintains a gardening blog, and lectures at gardening shows and conferences. She and her seeds are mentioned in the novel See Now Then by Jamaica Kincaid.

Shepherd has served on the advisory board of the National Gardening Association. Her charitable work includes donating seed for community, prison, and school gardens in the United States, Honduras, Nigeria, and Uganda, and a fundraising program through Renee's Garden for schools and nonprofit organizations.

== Trials and gardening philosophy ==
Shepherd lives on a four-acre site in the San Lorenzo Valley, north of Santa Cruz, where she cultivates trial gardens. She has had additional trial gardens in California, Seattle, Vermont, and Florida. In 2007, she was reported as testing 250 to 300 seed varieties each year, and has collected varieties from around North and South America, Europe, Asia and New Zealand. Her company is a signatory to the "Safe Seed Pledge" of the Council for Responsible Genetics, and her selections are mainly open-pollinated, heirloom, and "garden-worthy" hybrids.
