= Anton Schifferer =

German business executive and politician (1871–1943)

Prussian State Councilor
- In office 11 July 1933 – 20 July 1943

Reichstag Deputy
- In office 14 September 1930 – 4 June 1932

Personal details
- Born: 12 September 1871 Kiel, Province of Schleswig-Holstein, Kingdom of Prussia, German Empire
- Died: 20 July 1943 (aged 71) Neuwittenbek, Province of Schleswig-Holstein, Free State of Prussia, Nazi Germany
- Party: German People's Party
- Other political affiliations: National Liberal Party
- Education: Ph.D.
- Alma mater: Kiel University; Ludwig-Maximilians-Universität München; Weihenstephan-Triesdorf University of Applied Science
- Profession: Business Executive

Military service
- Allegiance: German Empire
- Branch/service: Imperial German Army
- Years of service: 1914–1918
- Rank: Hauptmann
- Unit: 16th Hussar Regiment
- Battles/wars: World War I
- Awards: Iron Cross, 1st and 2nd class Hohenzollern House Order with Swords

Anton Schifferer (12 September 1871 – 20 July 1943) was a German business executive who was also active as a politician at the provincial, state and national levels from 1908 until his death in 1943.

== Education and business career ==
Schifferer was born in Kiel, the son of a landowner and brewery owner. After attending the local Gymnasium, he worked at Gut Charlottenhof, his parents' estate near Kiel. In 1895, he took over the management of his father's brewery and, after it was converted into a public corporation, became chairman of the board of directors of the Schultheiss Brewery in Berlin until 1906. In 1901, he wrote a book that is still in print today, concerning the practical operation of a brewing business. From 1906 to 1908, he studied economics and natural sciences at Kiel University, the Ludwig-Maximilians-Universität München and the agricultural school in Weihenstephan (today, the Weihenstephan-Triesdorf University of Applied Science), earning a Ph.D. He was a member of the student corps Franconia München.

Schifferer was a founder of the Schleswig-Holstein University Society in 1918. He also was awarded an honorary doctorate of medicine in 1925 by the medical faculty of Kiel University. He took over the management of the family agricultural estate, and served as the chairman of the Protection Association of the Northern German Farmers Community. He was chairman of the supervisory boards of the Johann Faber AG pencil manufacturing company of Nuremberg, as well as a member of the supervisory board of several other companies, including some breweries and Aktiengesellschaft für Glasindustrie, formerly Friedrich Siemens of Dresden.

== Political career ==
Under the German Empire, Schifferer was a member of the National Liberal Party (NLP), sat on its executive board from 1907 to 1917 and served as the Party's chairman for the Province of Schleswig-Holstein. In 1908, he was elected to the Prussian House of Representatives where he represented the constituency of Tondern (today, Tønder, Denmark) until 1918. He participated in the First World War as a Hauptmann of reserves with the 16th Hussar Regiment, serving in the field from 1914 and on the German General Staff in 1918. He was awarded the Iron Cross, 1st and 2nd class and the House Order of Hohenzollern with Swords.

Following the collapse of the empire and the establishment of the Weimar Republic, in 1919 Schifferer joined the German People's Party (DVP), a successor to the disbanded NLP, and served as its chairman in Schleswig-Holstein. He was also elected as a member of the Schleswig-Holstein Provincial Landtag. In addition, from July 1921 to April 1933, he was the province's representative to the Reichsrat, the upper house of the national parliament.

In the general election of September 1930, Schifferer was elected as a Reichstag deputy from electoral constituency 13 (Schleswig-Holstein), and served until the dissolution of June 1932. After the Nazi seizure of power, he was appointed to the recently reconstituted Prussian State Council by Prussian Minister president Hermann Göring on 11 July 1933, remaining in that post until his death at the family estate in Neuwittenbek on 20 July 1943.

== Sources ==
- Anton Schifferer entry in Das Deutsche Führerlexikon 1934-1935
- Anton Schifferer entry in the Files of the Reich Chancellery
- Information about Anton Schifferer in the Reichstag database
- Lilla, Joachim (2005). Der Preußische Staatsrat 1921–1933: Ein biographisches Handbuch. Düsseldorf: Droste Verlag. ISBN 978-3-770-05271-4.
