= All-America Selections =

American seed evaluation organization

All-America Selections (AAS) is an American organization which tests new varieties of seed for use in gardening, and promotes those judged to perform best through an awards scheme ("AAS Winners"). The testing program involves horticulture professionals.

== Organization ==
AAS was founded by Ray Hastings in 1932, making it the oldest international seed and plant testing organization in North America. It is governed by a board consisting of four officers and six directors.

== Selection process ==
=== Submissions ===
Plant breeders and developers submit new plants to AAS for evaluation. The plants are then tested at more than 40 independent sites located in 24 US states and 5 Canadian provinces. A test site is called a trial garden or trial ground. Each trial ground has at least one official AAS judge. The judge supervises the trial and evaluates entries for AAS at no charge. None of the judges are paid for their AAS activities.

=== Judging ===
AAS Trials have been conducted every year since 1932. The number of judges and sites may vary. Typically, judges are horticultural professionals, and the sites, in different parts of North America, are part of a seed company trial ground, university, or other horticultural institution. All judges and trial sites are approved by the AAS Board of Directors with the objective of having well managed sites.

The site judge is responsible for conducting the trial of entries and the closest comparisons on the market. The judge evaluates entries looking for desirable qualities such as novel flower forms, flower colors, flower show above foliage, fragrance, length of flowering season, and disease or pest tolerances or resistance. Vegetables are judged looking for such traits as speed to harvest, total yield, fruit taste, fruit quality, ease of harvest, plant habit, disease, and pest resistance. In the last ten years, an entry needs to have at least two significantly improved qualities to be considered by judges for an AAS Award.

The judges evaluate AAS trials all season, reporting their scores each fall. The judges score each entry from 0 to 5 points, with 5 being the highest. AAS uses an independent accounting firm to calculate the average score of each entry. Only the entry with the highest average score is considered for a possible AAS Award. The AAS judges determine which, if any, new unsold entries have proven superior qualities to be introduced as AAS Winners.

=== Awards ===
In 1984 the AAS Board of Directors decided to simplify the award system and award only two types. There is an AAS Gold Medal award reserved for a breeding breakthrough. Gold Medal Awards have been rare, only given once or twice a decade. The other AAS Award recognizes a flower or vegetable for significant achievements, proven to be superior to all others on the market. Award winners in past years have included the pansy variety Viola wittrockiana ‘Dwarf-Swiss Giants’, Coreopsis ‘Early Sunrise’, ‘Sugar Snap’ peas, and Zinnia ‘Thumbelina’.

=== Public relations ===
AAS does not advertise the AAS Award Winners. AAS relies upon a public relations program to inform gardeners about AAS Winners that are announced each September. Consumer magazines, newspapers, garden club bulletins and cooperative extension agents are depended upon to introduce AAS Winners to home gardeners.
