= Josef-Hofmiller-Gymnasium =

Coordinates: 48°24′20″N 11°44′34″E

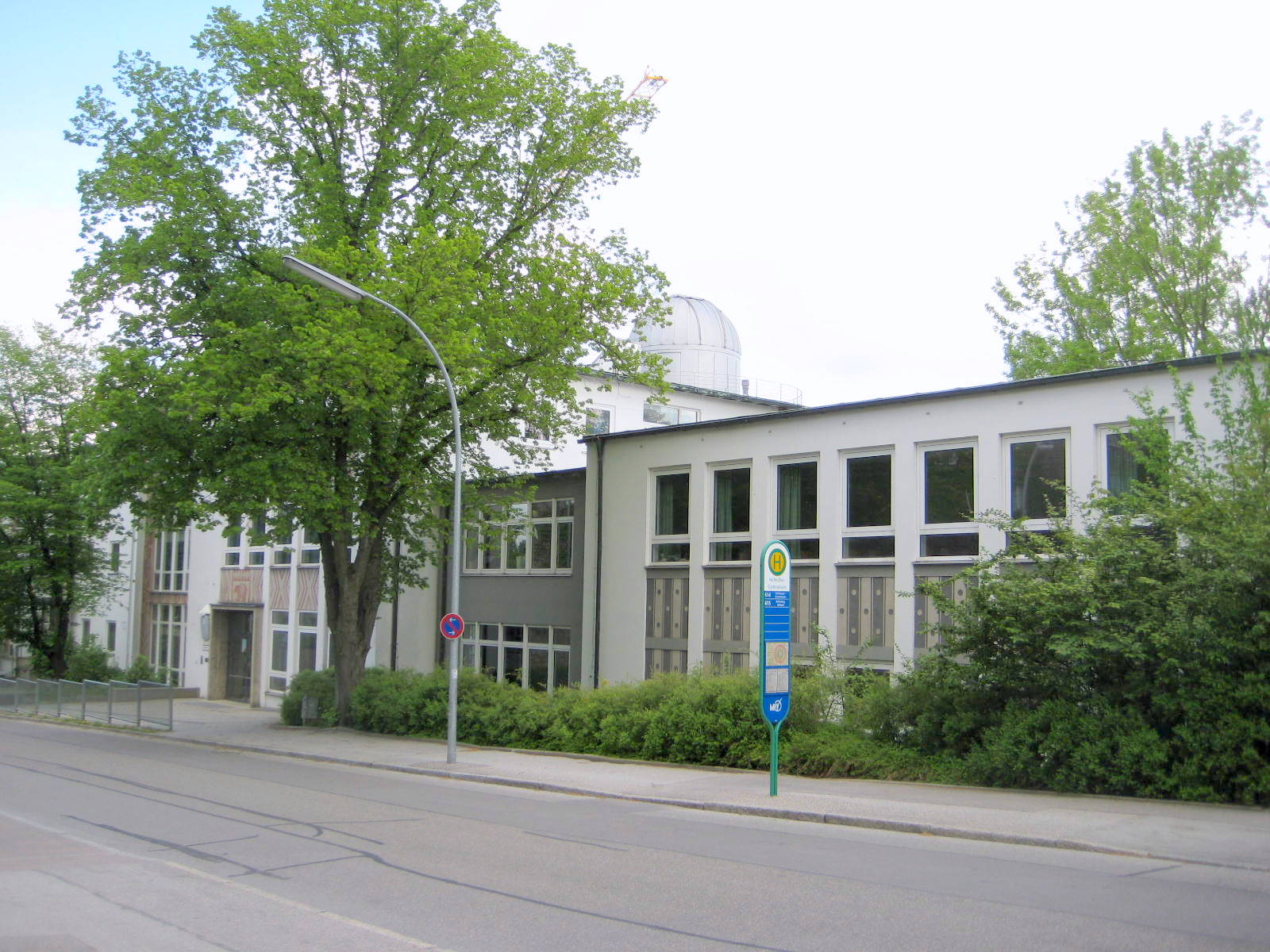
Josef-Hofmiller-Gymnasium

The Josef-Hofmiller-Gymnasium (JoHo) is a gymnasium in Freising, Bavaria, Germany. It is named after Josef Hofmiller (DE).

Currently, around 820 students are taught in 24 classes at the Josef-Hofmiller-Gymnasium.
