= Weihenstephan =

Part of Freising north of Munich

Coordinates: 48°23′42″N 11°43′40″E

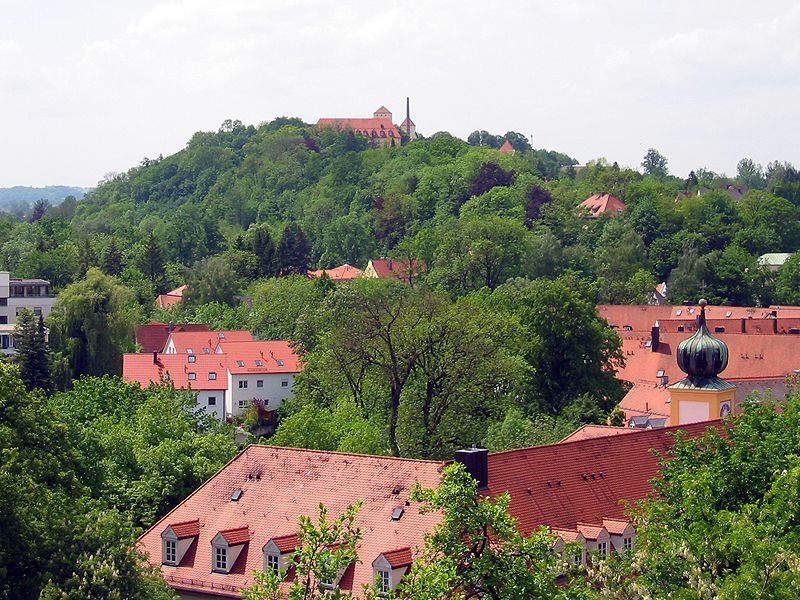
Weihenstephan

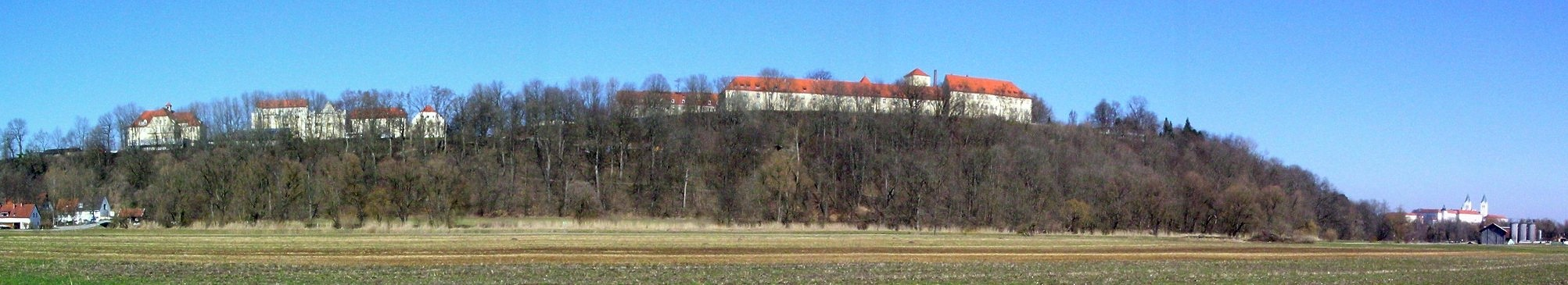
Weihenstephan

Weihenstephan (German pronunciation: [ˈvaɪənˌʃtɛfan]) is a part of Freising north of Munich, Germany. It is located on the Weihenstephan Hill, named after the Weihenstephan Abbey, in the west of the city.

Weihenstephan is known for:

- the Benedictine Weihenstephan Abbey, founded 725, which established the oldest still-operating brewery in the world in 1040 (see History of beer). The brewery is now a company called Bayerische Staatsbrauerei Weihenstephan (Bavarian State Brewery Weihenstephan, i.e. it is owned by the State of Bavaria) and closely related to the Technical University of Munich (TUM) and its graduate studies program for brewing and beverage manufacturing.
- the site of one of the four campuses of the Technical University of Munich, namely the School of Life Sciences
- the Hochschule Weihenstephan-Triesdorf
- the Molkerei Weihenstephan, a formerly state-operated dairy that also closely cooperated with the TUM and its agricultural studies programme, but which has now been sold to the Müller dairy group.
- the Sichtungsgarten Weihenstephan, a notable horticultural garden

== Climate ==
Climate data for Weihenstephan (1991–2020 normals)
Month	Jan	Feb	Mar	Apr	May	Jun	Jul	Aug	Sep	Oct	Nov	Dec	Year
Mean daily maximum °C (°F)	2.4 (36.3)	4.4 (39.9)	9.4 (48.9)	14.5 (58.1)	18.7 (65.7)	22.0 (71.6)	24.2 (75.6)	24.5 (76.1)	19.0 (66.2)	13.3 (55.9)	7.0 (44.6)	3.3 (37.9)	13.6 (56.5)
Daily mean °C (°F)	−0.6 (30.9)	0.4 (32.7)	4.5 (40.1)	8.8 (47.8)	13.1 (55.6)	16.3 (61.3)	18.0 (64.4)	18.0 (64.4)	13.2 (55.8)	8.7 (47.7)	3.8 (38.8)	0.5 (32.9)	8.7 (47.7)
Mean daily minimum °C (°F)	−3.6 (25.5)	−3.3 (26.1)	0.1 (32.2)	3.2 (37.8)	7.4 (45.3)	10.7 (51.3)	12.3 (54.1)	12.1 (53.8)	8.2 (46.8)	4.6 (40.3)	0.8 (33.4)	−2.3 (27.9)	4.2 (39.6)
Average precipitation mm (inches)	44.7 (1.76)	34.0 (1.34)	46.8 (1.84)	42.5 (1.67)	85.8 (3.38)	99.1 (3.90)	98.4 (3.87)	87.1 (3.43)	67.4 (2.65)	60.6 (2.39)	52.9 (2.08)	54.7 (2.15)	774.2 (30.48)
Average precipitation days (≥ 1.0 mm)	14.7	13.8	14.7	12.2	15.1	16.2	15.6	13.7	13.6	15.3	14.3	16.8	175
Average snowy days (≥ 1.0 cm)	14.8	12.9	4.1	0.6	0	0	0	0	0	0.1	3.3	9.9	45.7
Average relative humidity (%)	88.1	84.6	78.7	72.5	74.7	76.7	75.0	76.3	82.6	87.1	90.5	89.9	81.4
Mean monthly sunshine hours	62.8	91.0	144.9	189.4	214.7	226.7	242.2	240.7	169.8	110.7	61.7	55.3	1,809.1
Source: World Meteorological Organization
