= Freising =

Town in Bavaria, Germany

- Town
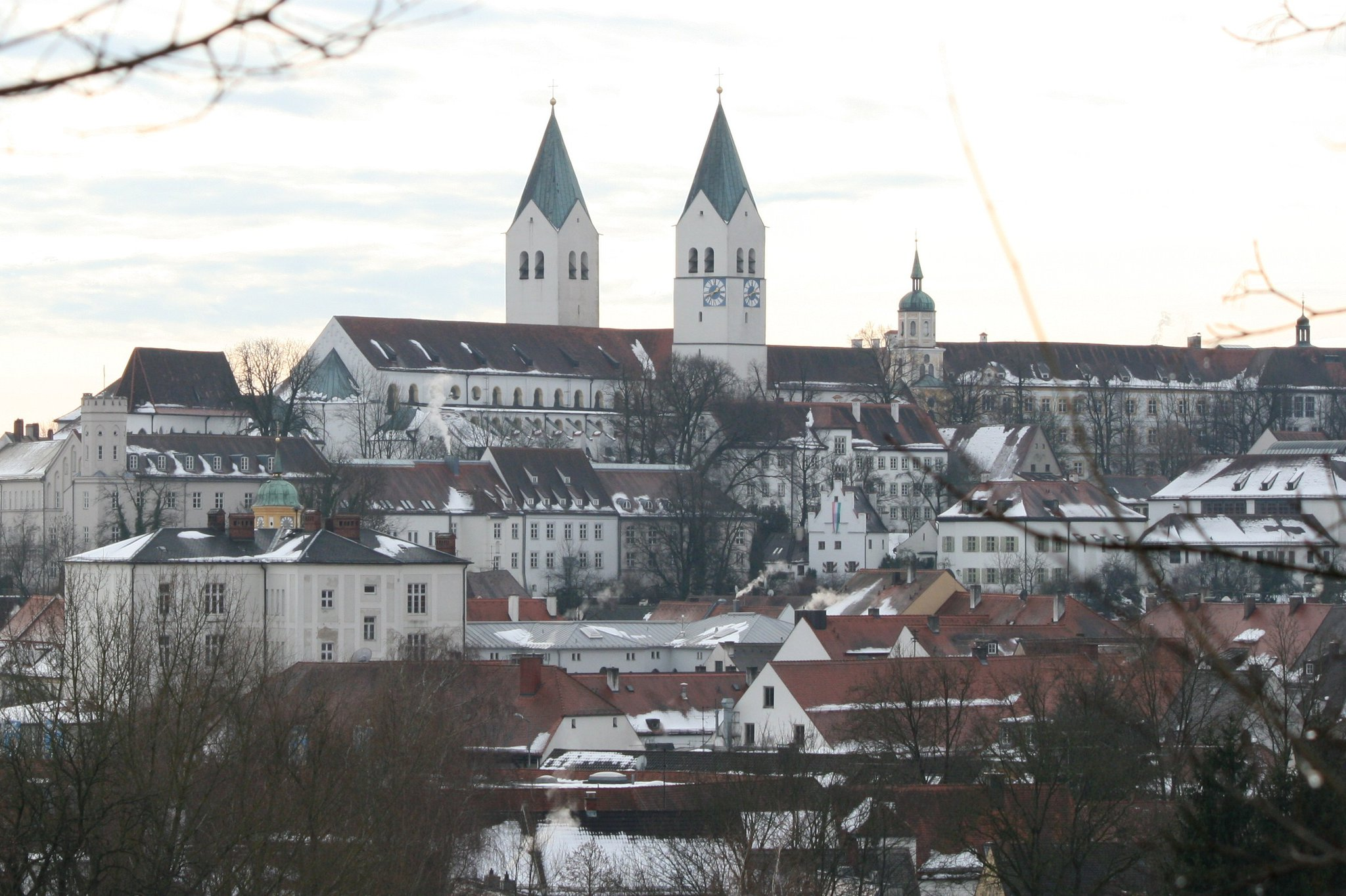
- Domberg (cathedral hill) Freising

- Coat of arms

- Location of Freising within Freising district
- Interactive map of Freising
- Location within Germany Location within Bavaria
- Coordinates: 48°24′10″N 11°44′56″E
- Country: Germany
- State: Bavaria
- Admin. region: Oberbayern
- District: Freising
- Subdivisions: 29 Stadtteile

Government
  - Mayor (2020–26): Tobias Eschenbacher

Area
  - Total: 88.59 km^{2} (34.20 sq mi)
- Elevation: 448 m (1,470 ft)

Population (2025-12-31)
  - Total: 48,953
  - Density: 552.6/km^{2} (1,431/sq mi)
- Time zone: UTC+01:00 (CET)
  - Summer (DST): UTC+02:00 (CEST)
- Postal codes: 85354, 85356
- Dialling codes: 08161
- Vehicle registration: FS
- Website: www.freising.de

Freising (German pronunciation: [ˈfʁaɪzɪŋ]) is a university town in Bavaria, Germany, and the capital of the Freising Landkreis (district), with a population of about 50,000.

== Location ==
Freising is the oldest town between Regensburg and Bolzano, and is located on the Isar river in Upper Bavaria, north of Munich and near the Munich International Airport. The city is built on and around two prominent hills: the Cathedral Hill (Domberg) with the former Bishop's Residence and Freising Cathedral, and Weihenstephan Hill (Weihenstephaner Berg) with the former Weihenstephan Abbey, containing the oldest working brewery in the world. It was also the location of the first recorded tornado in Europe. The city is 448 metres above sea level.

== Cultural significance ==
Freising is one of the oldest settlements in Bavaria, becoming a major religious centre in the early Middle Ages. It is the centre of an important diocese. Some important historical documents were created between 900 and 1200 in its monastery:

- Freising manuscripts written in Slovenian, being the first Roman-script continuous text in a Slavic language
- Chronicle or history of the two cities by Otto of Freising

The above and other scripts from that time can be found in the "Bayerische Staatsbibliothek" (Bavarian State Library) in Munich.

== History ==
Even though archaeological finds show that the area was settled in the late Stone Age and Bronze Age, no proof has been found yet to suggest a continuous settlement until the 8th century AD.

Around 700 AD the Frankish Agilolfing dukes built a simple palace on the highest hill in Freising as part of its Duchy of Bavaria.

In 724 AD, the Frankish Saint Corbinian was sent to the Duchy of Bavaria by the Catholic Church to spread Christianity. On the highest hill in Freising, where there was already a simple sanctuary, Corbinian erected a Benedictine monastery and a school, to help preach the Gospel to the local people.

According to his Vita by Bishop Arbeo, Corbinian was on his way to Rome when his packhorse was attacked and killed by a wild bear. By divine power, Corbinian ordered the bear to carry his luggage over the Alps. When he finally arrived in Rome he let the bear free. The saddled bear is still the symbol of the city, displayed in the coat of arms, as well as statues and paintings. After Corbinian's death, Saint Boniface established Freising as a Catholic diocese. Between 764–783, Bishop Arbeo founded a library and a scriptorium (writing room) at the abbey. The settlement started to become a religious centre.

The earliest recorded tornado in Europe struck Freising in 788.

The mortal remains of Pope Alexander I are said to have been transferred to Freising in 834. In 996, Freising received city rights from Emperor Otto III.

As early as the 10th century, in order to collect additional revenue, monks were sent from Freising down the Isar River to build a toll bridge on the Salt Road between Salzburg and Augsburg. This village would be later known as München (or Munich, which means 'of the monks'). By 1158, Duke Henry the Lion destroyed the bridge and customs building and built new ones closer to his home further downriver, (near the center of modern downtown Munich), so that he could collect the revenue instead.

The construction of the Freising Cathedral in its current Romanesque style started in 1159 and was completed in 1205. The Romanesque wooden ceiling was replaced by a gothic vault in 1481–1483.

Freising went through difficult times during the Thirty Years' War. In 1632, the Swedish King Gustavus Adolphus came through Freising on his way to Munich. He demanded 30,000 guilders as the sum to protect the city from destruction. Nevertheless, his army sacked the city. Hunger and plague raged when the Swedes invaded the city again in 1646. In 1674, the Church placed a statue of the Virgin Mary in the city square as a sign that war and plague had been overcome.

A wave of witch hunts and trials broke out from 1715–1717 in Freising, and again in 1721–1723. Most of the accused were child beggars. Several children were executed.

In 1802/1803 Bavaria fell under the influence of Napoleonic France and church-controlled lands were secularized. In Freising, the more than thousand-year-old bishopric was abolished. The Roman Catholic Church lost most of its properties and authority over the city. Although the seat of the diocese was moved to Munich in 1821, including the elevation to an archdiocese, Freising has remained the seat of diocesan administration until today. The Diocesan Museum is located in Freising.

In 1858 the Bavarian Eastern Railway Company built the first railway line from Munich to Freising, Landshut and Regensburg for passenger and rail traffic.

Near the end of the Second World War, Allied aircraft bombed Freising on 18 April 1945. By 30 April, units of the US Army arrived in Freising.

In 1998, Mamdouh Mahmud Salim, also known as Abu Hajir al-Iraqi, a key figure in the founding of al-Qaeda and a trusted associate of Osama Bin Laden, was apprehended in Freising.

In 2006, Pope Benedict XVI visited Freising during a papal visit. He was formerly archbishop of Munich/Freising from 1977 to 1982.

== Education and research ==
=== Schools ===
There are several elementary schools in the city of Freising. The St. Korbinian elementary school is located in the city center, the Neustift elementary school in Neustift, the St. Lantbert elementary school in Lerchenfeld and the Paul-Gerhardt elementary school in the north of the city. Another elementary school is the Vötting Elementary School, to which the schoolhouse in Pulling also belongs.

Secondary schools include the three secondary schools Neustift, Paul-Gerhard and Lerchenfeld. The first two are located at the sites of the elementary schools of the same names. The Karl-Meichelbeck-Realschule is located in the immediate vicinity of the Paul-Gerhard-Schule. At Guten Änger in Lerchenfeld, the new Montessori school building was opened in 2015 and a second Realschule in 2018. The Wippenhauser Straße is home to the Wirtschaftsschule and the Fachoberschule/Berufsoberschule. The oldest of Freising's three high schools is the Dom-Gymnasium on the Domberg. The Camerloher-Gymnasium is one of the few artistic grammar schools. The Josef-Hofmiller-Gymnasium, which emerged from the Dom-Gymnasium, is Freising's largest grammar school.

The Freising Vocational School and the Vocational School for Child Care are located in the same building. The latter is a full-time school that trains pediatric nurses in two years. The vocational school for nursing is affiliated with the Freising Clinic. The Weihenstephan State Vocational School for Floral Art offers advanced training to become a state-certified designer for floral art.

=== Universities ===
The Freising-Weihenstephan campus is an extensive complex of higher education institutions and research institutes in the western urban area of Freising, in the Weihenstephan and Vötting districts. It has been developed into the so-called "Green Center of Bavaria" for decades and continues to be modernized and designed as a "science and research campus". It includes not only the "Center of Life Sciences", the Weihenstephan Science Center for Nutrition, Land Use and Environment of the Technical University of Munich, but also the most important part of the Weihenstephan-Triesdorf University of Applied Sciences.

The Freising Clinic is an academic teaching hospital of the Technical University of Munich. It is located north of the old town.

=== Research and education centers ===
Several research centers have been established in the vicinity of the two universities, i.e. mostly located on campus. The TUM Weihenstephan Research Center for Brewing and Food Quality, the TUM Central Institute for Nutrition and Food Research and the TUM Hans Eisenmann Center for Agricultural Sciences belong to the Technical University of Munich. The Bavarian State Institute of Agriculture and the Bavarian State Institute of Forestry and Forestry are authorities of the Free State of Bavaria.

Other non-university institutions include the German Research Institute for Food Chemistry, the Fraunhofer Institute for Process Engineering and Packaging, DEULA Bavaria and the IZB Freising-Weihenstephan start-up center for green biotechnology.

In addition to the natural sciences and technology, there are facilities in the area of religious education. The Institut für Theologische und Pastorale Fortbildung Freising is dedicated to the continuing education of pastoral counselors. The Kardinal-Döpfner-Haus educational center is also located in the former residence on the Domberg. Further offers are provided by the Katholisches Kreisbildungswerk and the Pallotti-Haus, a Christian educational house and therapy center.

=== Libraries ===
The oldest library in Freising is the Freising Cathedral Library, located on the Domberg. This was founded by Bishop Arbeo and is the central library of the Archdiocese of Munich and Freising and one of the largest church libraries in Germany. The city library was founded in 1959. The central library of the Weihenstephan-Triesdorf University of Applied Sciences is located in the Hofgarten in Weihenstephan. Also in Weihenstephan is a branch library of the University Library of the Technical University of Munich.

=== City archive ===
The Stadtarchiv Freising is a scientific institution of the city of Freising. It holds documents from the 14th century to the present day. It has existed as an institution since 1909. It is a public institution, open to all citizens and offers a reference library with about 4500 volumes in a reading room.

Since 2003, the Freising Municipal Archives have been temporarily located in the "Haus der Vereine" (House of Associations), a barracks building of the Jägerkaserne (Vimy Barracks from 1938), which was built in 1906 and has since been abandoned. It will remain in this listed building until a new building is realized in Fischergasse, east of the former prison.

== Transport ==
Freising station, situated on the southern edge of the old town, is on the Munich to Regensburg railway. It is the northern terminus of line S1 of the Munich S-Bahn, which connects Freising with Munich at 20 minute intervals. It is also served by an hourly service on RE 22 to/from Munich Airport. Other services call at the station on journeys to Munich, Nuremberg, Passau, Prague and Regensburg.

The A92 motorway crosses the southern part of the city, connecting Freising to Munich and Lower Bavaria. The A92 connects to the A99 Munich ring motorway, which provides further connections to other parts of Bavaria and Germany.

Freising has a city bus network that is integrated into the fare structure of the Munich Transport Association (MVV). It is also connected to a number of regional bus routes, including ones to Munich Airport and the Garching campus of the Technical University of Munich. All bus routes serve the railway station.

== Twin towns – sister cities ==
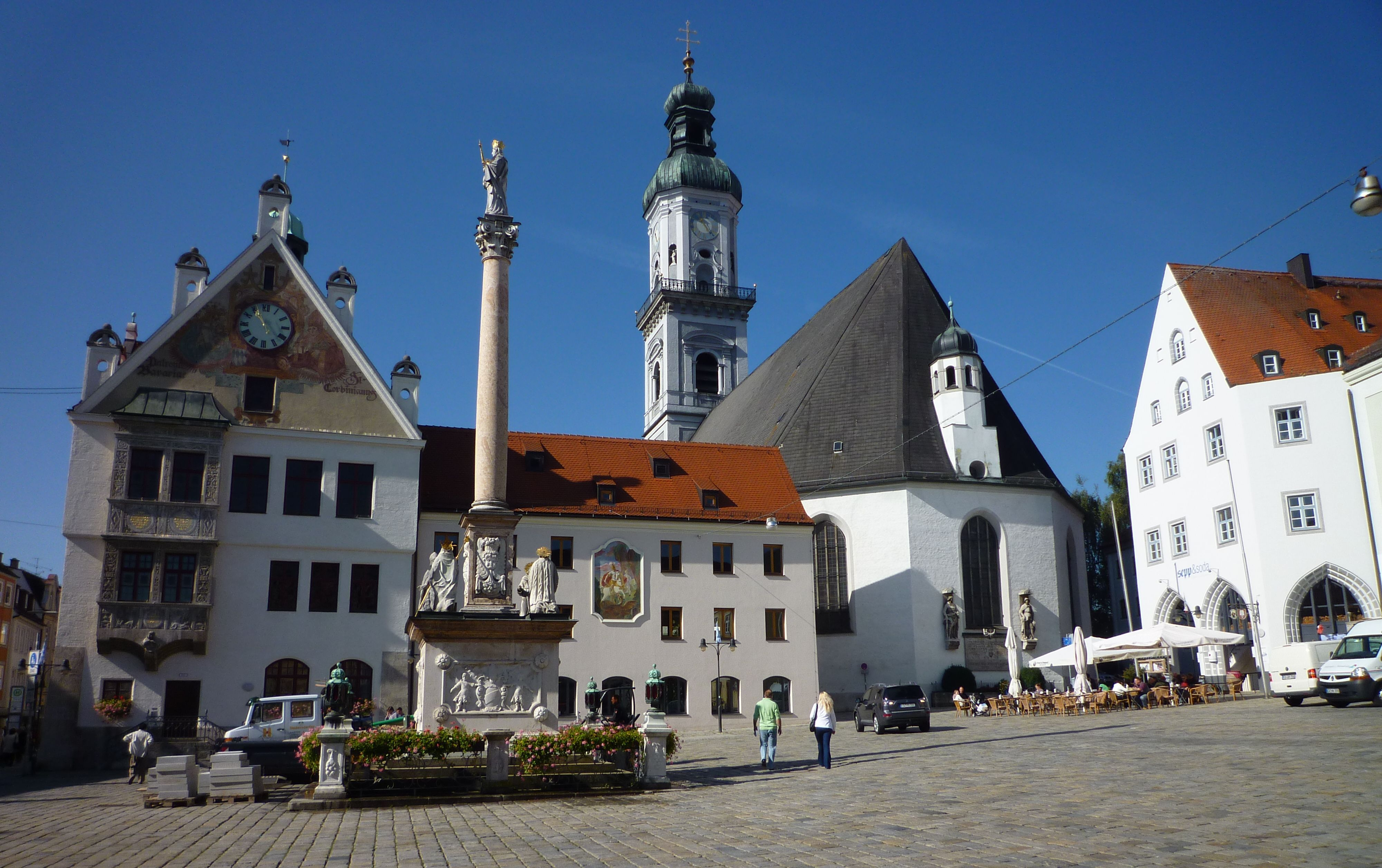
Marienplatz

Freising is twinned with:

- Arpajon, France (1991)
- Innichen, Italy (1969)
- Maria Wörth, Austria (1978)
- Obervellach, Austria (1963)
- Škofja Loka, Slovenia (2004)
- Waidhofen an der Ybbs, Austria (1986)

== Notable people ==
- Sandra Abstreiter (born 1998), Ice hockey goaltender
- Otto of Freising (1112–1158), bishop
- Mair von Landshut, late 15th-century artist, was a citizen and probably born in Freising
- Georg Eder (1523–1587), jurist and historian
- Martin Ruland the Elder (1532–1602), physician and alchemist
- Johann Stadlmayr (1575–1648), court music director and composer
- Benignus von Safferling (1824–1899), Bavarian General and Minister of War
- Ludwig Prandtl (1875–1953), physicist
- Ernst Kraus (1889–1970), a German geologist
- Karl Maria Demelhuber (1896–1988), SS-Obergruppenführer and General of the Waffen-SS
- Anton Schlüter (died 1999), tractor manufacturer
- Jost Raba (1900–2000), violinist
- Karl Gustav Fellerer (1902–1984), a German musicologist
- Albrecht Obermaier (1912–2004), German naval officer, last deputy naval officer of the Bundesmarine
- Pope Benedict XVI (1927–2022), Pope from 2005–2013
- Karl Huber (artist) (1928–2009), German painter and sculptor
- Heinrich Reinhardt (born 1947), Roman Catholic priest and professor of philosophy
- Peter Neumair (born 1950), wrestler
- Joseph Weiss (born 1959), German diplomat
- Hans Pflügler (born 1960), footballer, former clubs: Bayern Munich - World champion 1990
- Alexander Kutschera (born 1968), footballer
- Stefan Diez (born 1971), German industrial designer
- Ferdinand Bader (born 1981), ski jumper
- Brigitte Wagner (born 1983), wrestler
- Maximilian Haas (born 1985), footballer
- Maximilian Wittek (born 1995), footballer
- Veit Arnpeck (c. 1440), Bavarian chronicler
- Benignus von Safferling (1824–1899), General of the Bavarian Army and War Minister
- Oskar von Niedermayer (1885–1948), officer and adventurer

== Points of interest ==
- Freising Cathedral
- St. Georg Church
- Sichtungsgarten Weihenstephan, a notable horticultural garden
- Freising Town Hall
- Marienplatz
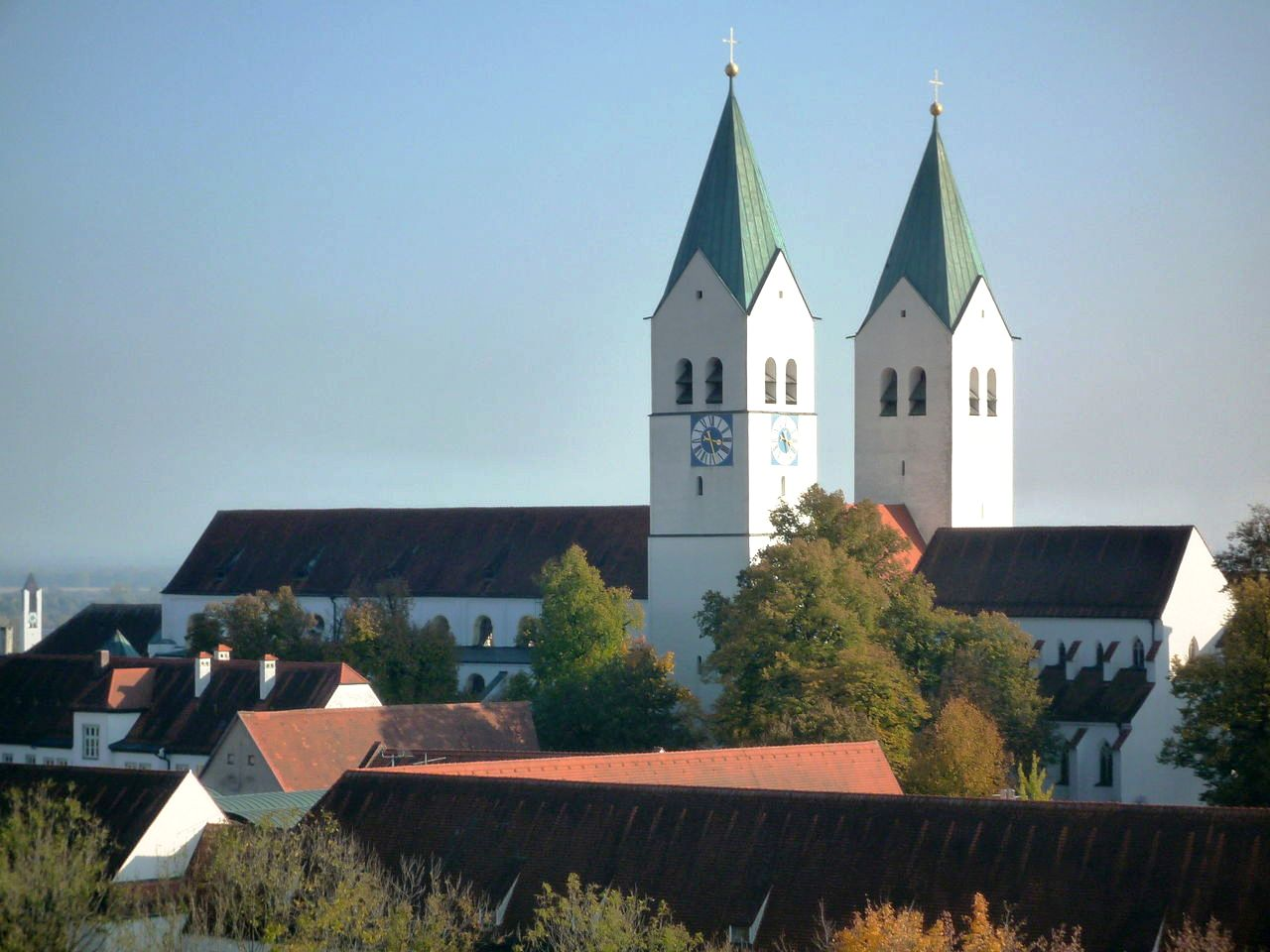
Freising Cathedral

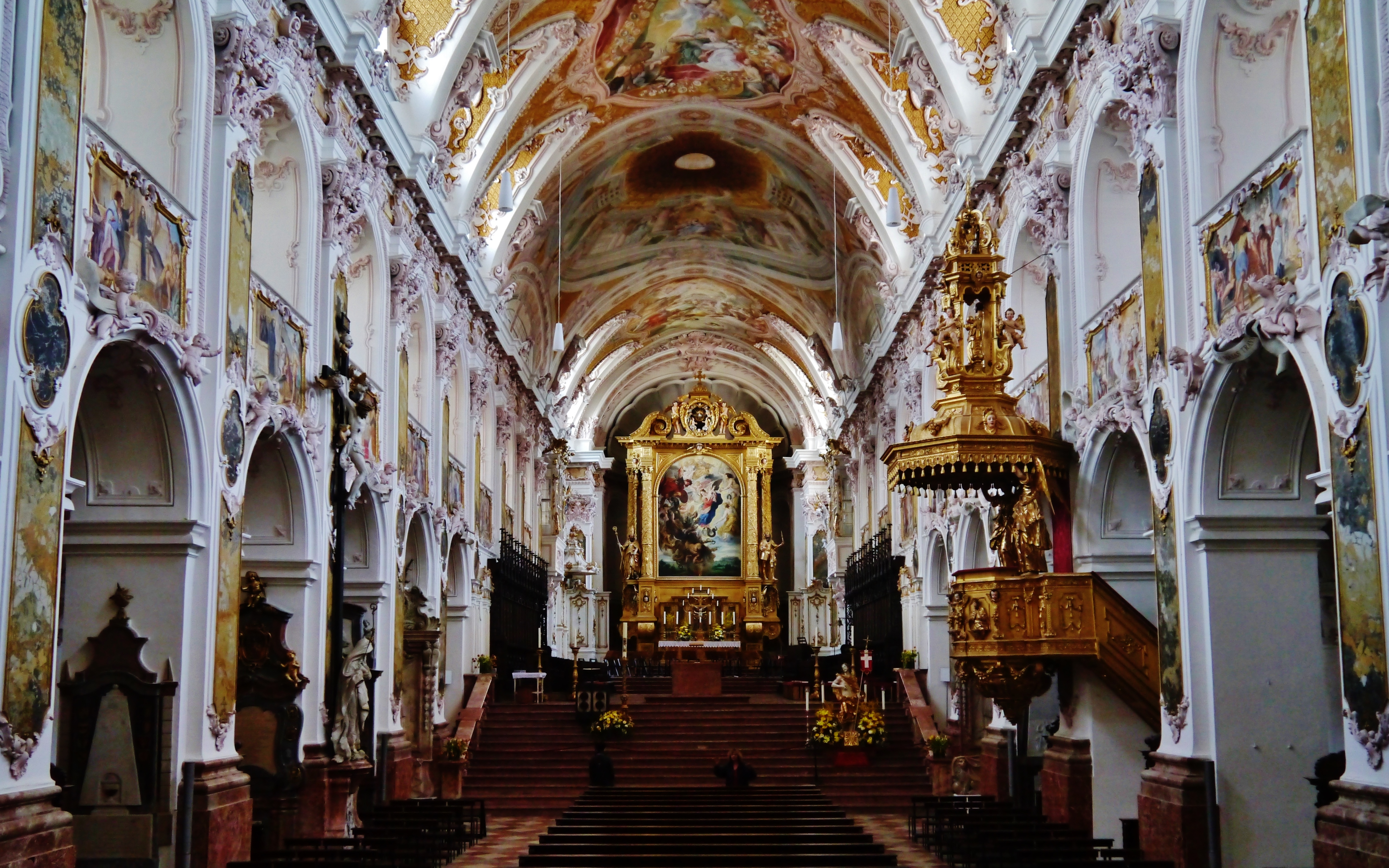
Cathedral interior

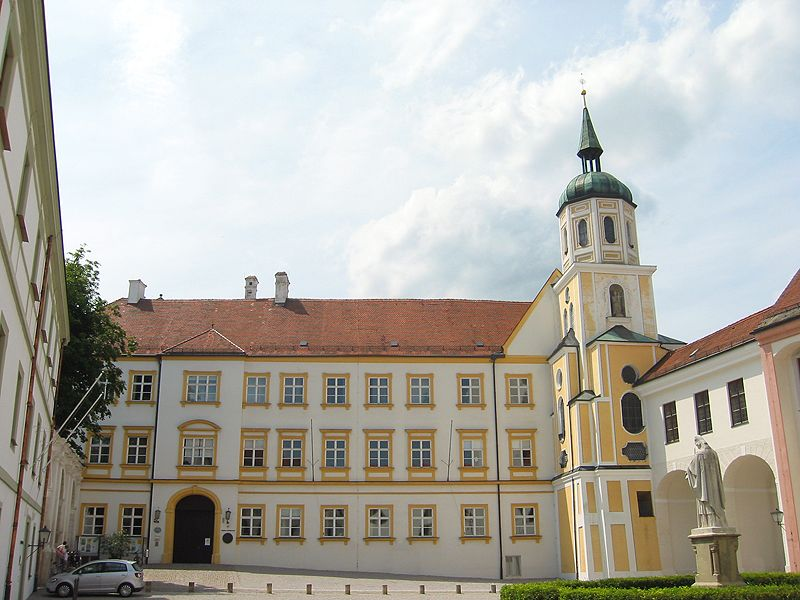
Bishop's Residence

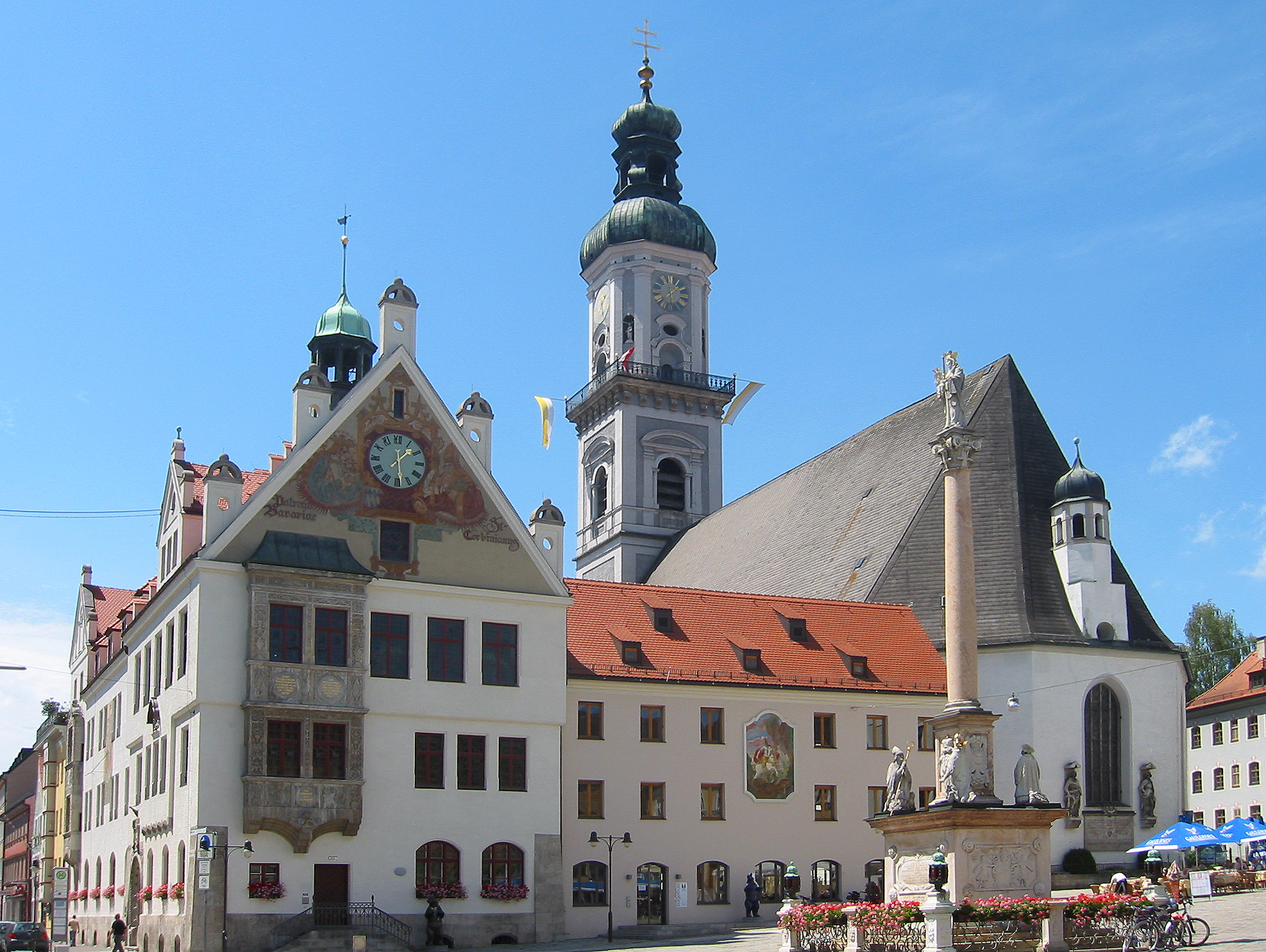
Town Hall and St. George's Church

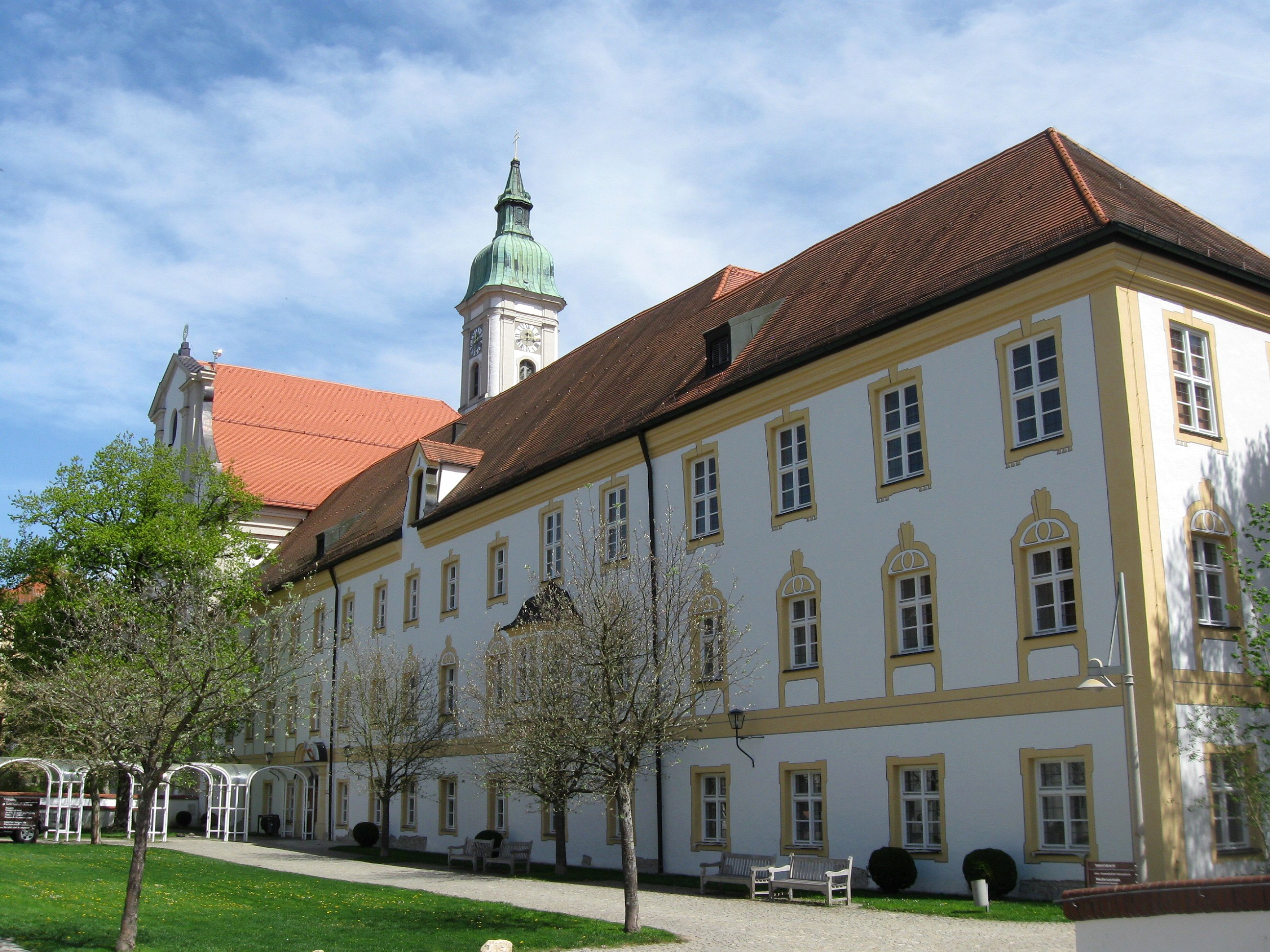
Neustift Abbey

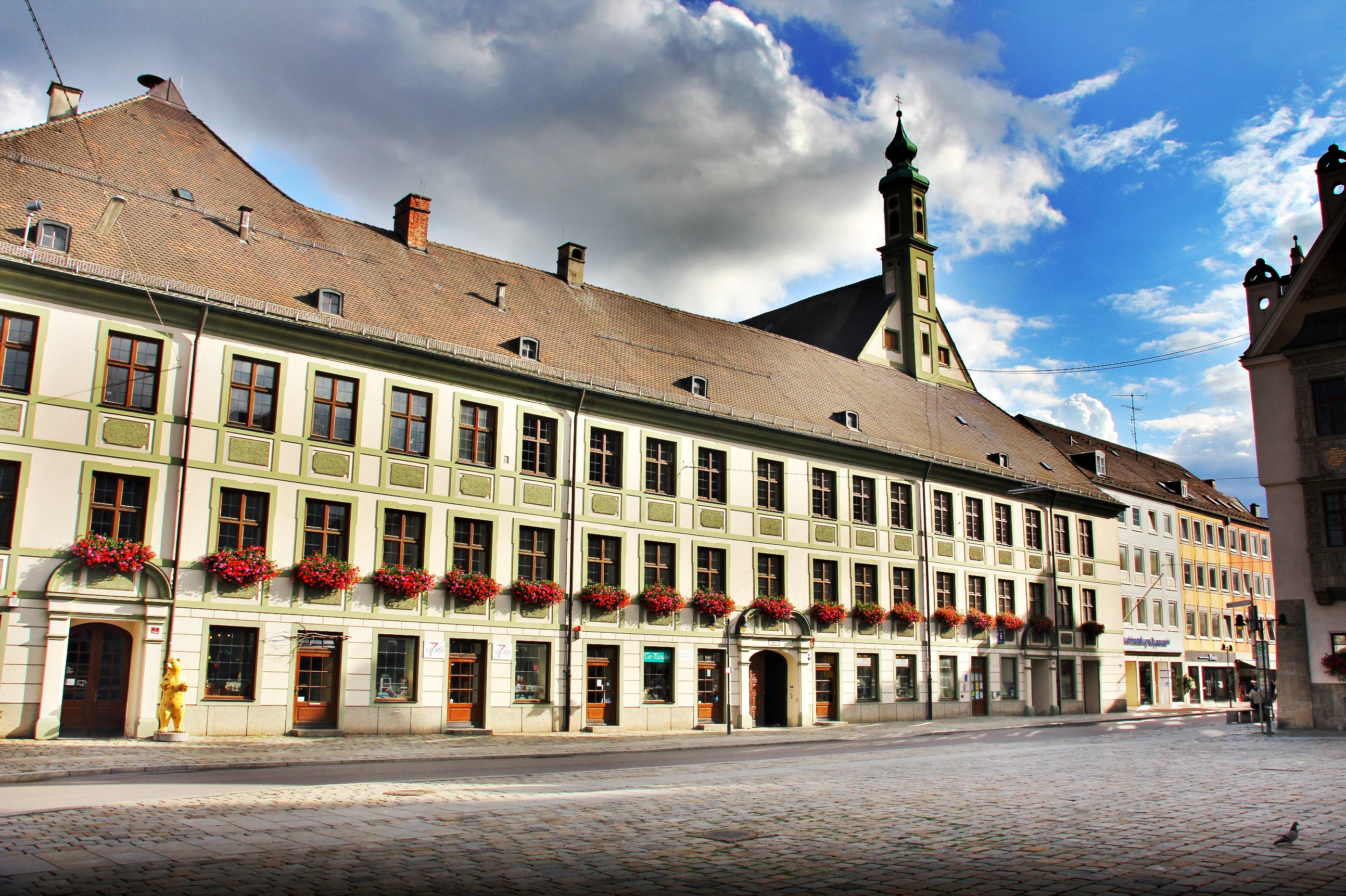
Asam Building

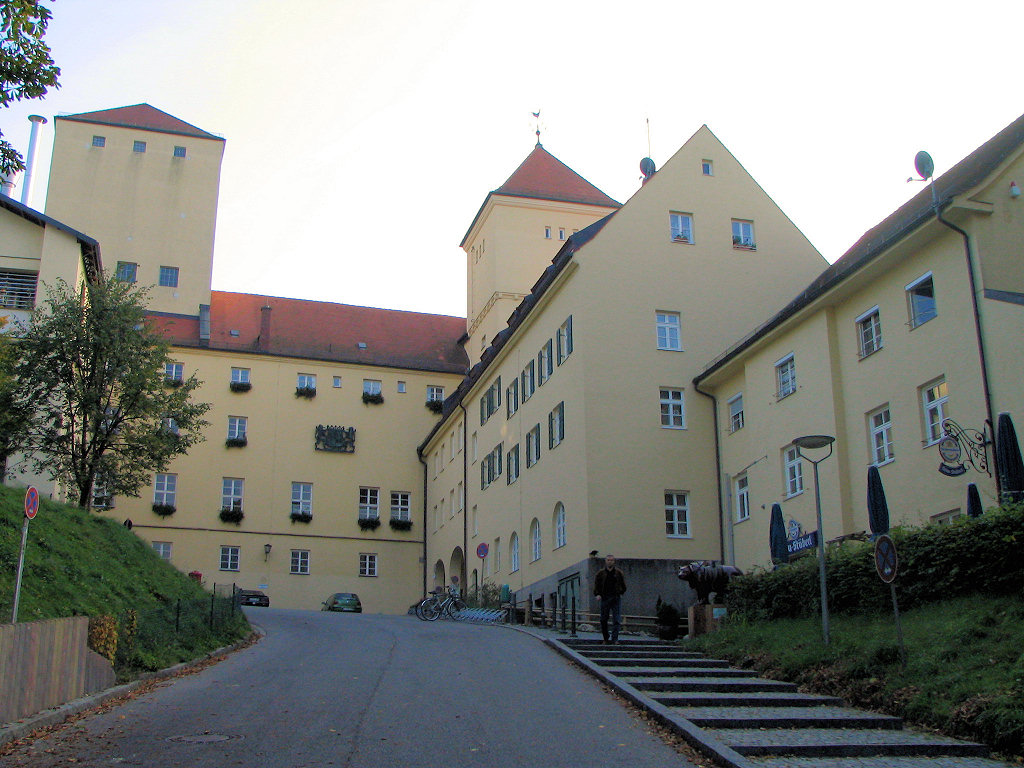
Weihenstephan Brewery

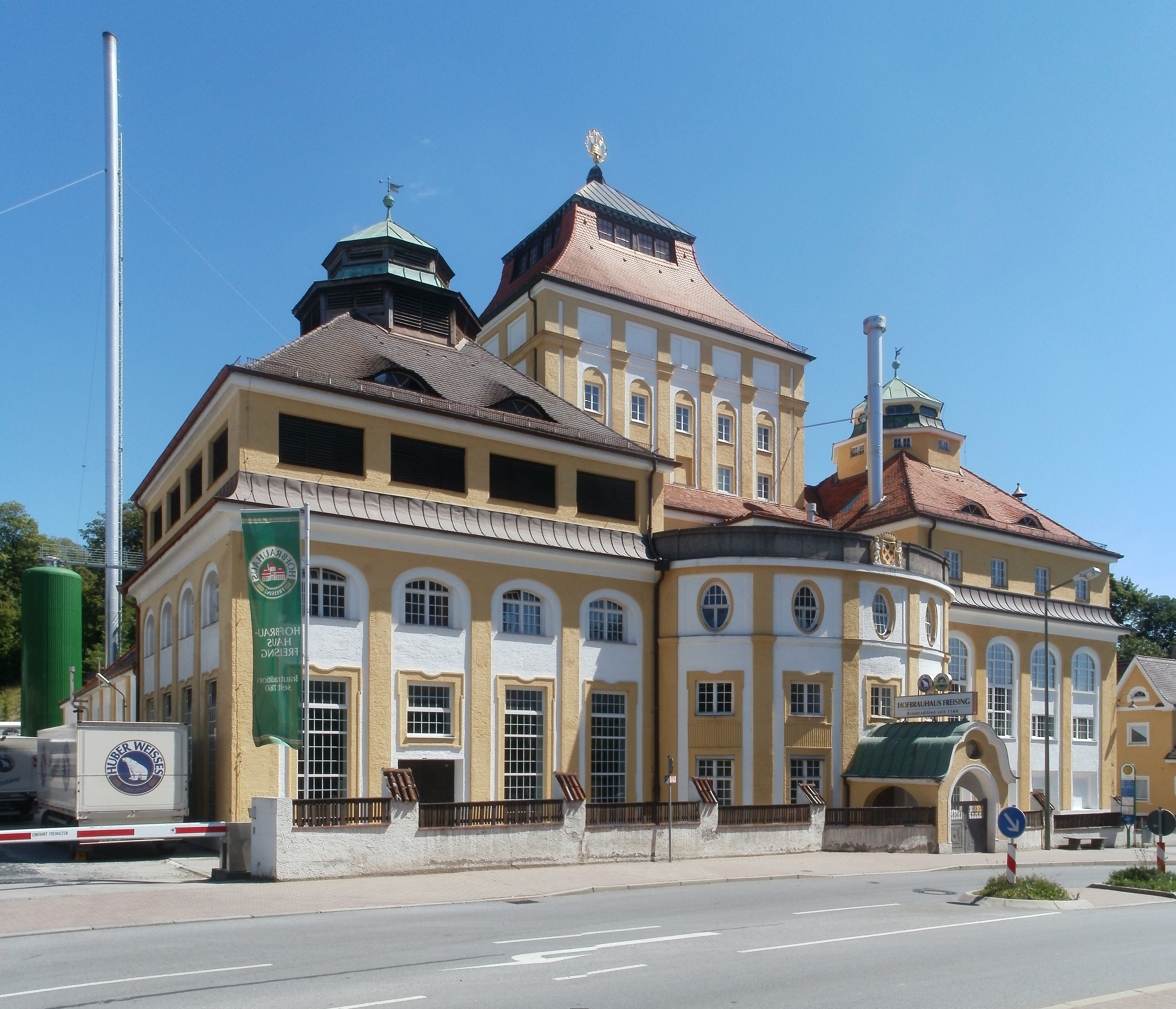
Hofbrauhaus Brewery

== Sports ==
Freising has 4 sport clubs: SE Freising, SV Vötting-Weihenstephan, SC Freising, and SG Eichenfeld.

== See also ==
- Prince-Bishopric of Freising
