= Richard Winfield Hanson =

American biochemist (1936–2014)

- Born: 1936; New Jersey, United States
- Died: February 28, 2014 (aged 78); United States
- Education: Brown University
- Occupation: University professor
- Scientific career
- Fields: Biochemistry
- Workplaces: Case Western Reserve University

Richard Winfield Hanson (1936 – February 28, 2014) was an American biochemist, researcher and university professor.

== Life ==
Hanson was born in 1936 in New Jersey.

He died on February 28, 2014 at the age of 78.

== Education ==
Hanson attended Northeastern University in Boston.

He completed his PhD at Brown University in 1961. His doctoral dissertation supervisor was Paul F. Fenton.

== Career ==
Hanson served as the Leonard and Jean Skeggs Professor of Biochemistry and Distinguished University Professor at Case Western Reserve School of Medicine.

His first graduate student, Dr. Shirley M. Tilghman, has served as president of Princeton University.

== Awards and honours ==
Hanson has received a number of awards:

- William C. Rose (1999)
- the ASBMB/Merck (2006) awards from the American Society of Biochemistry and Molecular Biology
- the Meade Johnson Award (1971)
- the Osborne/Mendel Award (1995) from the American Institute of Nutrition
