= Karl Foerster =

German author and gardener (1874–1970)

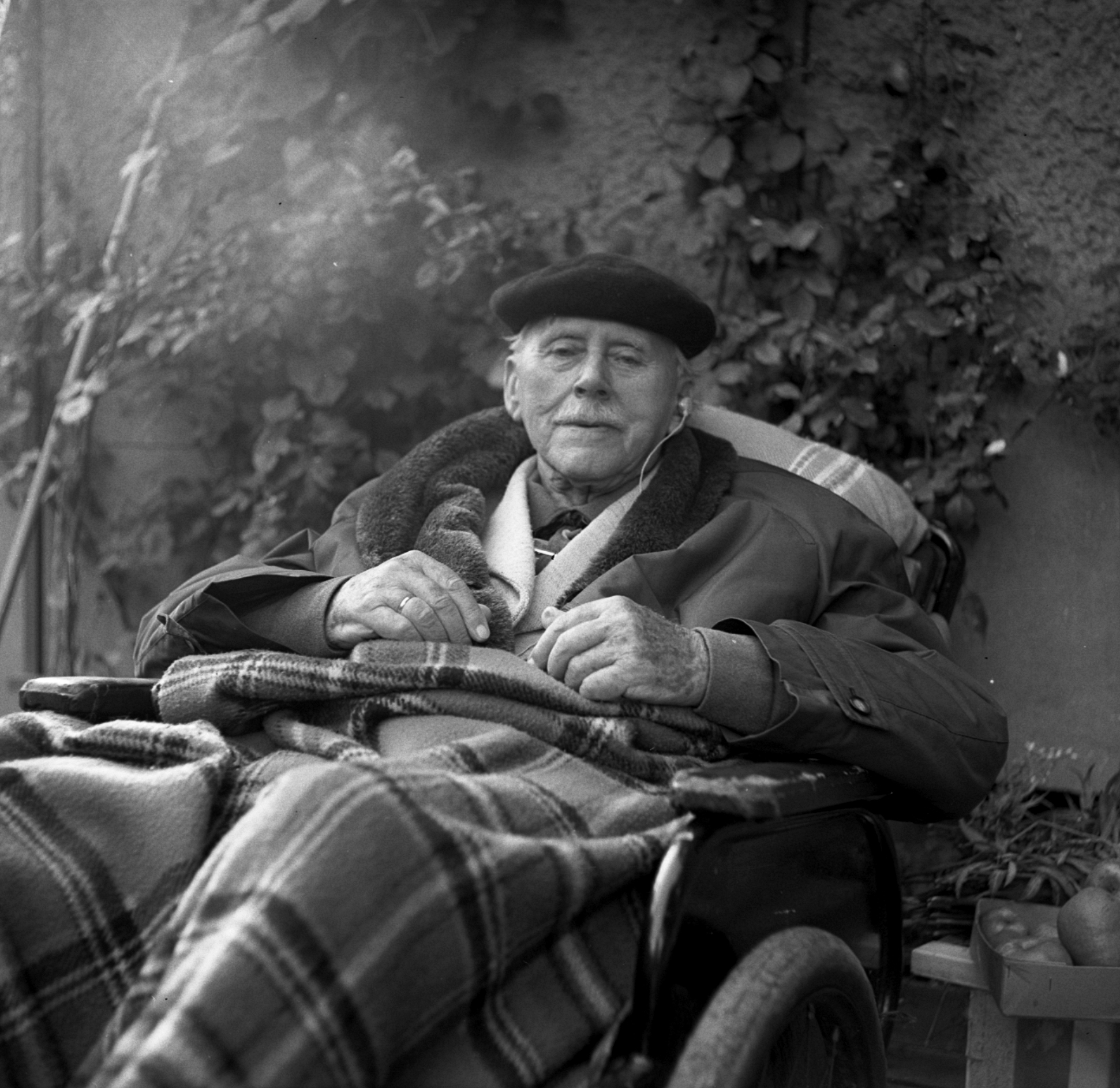
Karl Foerster in 1967

Karl Foerster (March 9, 1874 – November 27, 1970) was a German gardener, nurseryman, garden writer, and garden philosopher.

Foerster helped popularize the use of grasses in garden design.

== Bibliography ==
- Winterharte Blütenstauden und Sträucher der Neuzeit. Verlagsbuchhandlung J.J. Weber, Leipzig 1911
- Vom Blütengarten der Zukunft. Furche Verlag Hamburg 1917, mehrere Nachauflagen beim „Verlag der Gartenschönheit“ Berlin-Westend
- Unendliche Heimat. Verlag der Gartenschönheit Berlin-Westend 1925
- Der Rittersporn. Verlag der Gartenschönheit Berlin-Westend 1928
- Garten als Zauberschlüssel. Rowohlt, Berlin 1934.
- Staudenbilderbuch. Verlag der Gartenschönheit Berlin/Bern 1935
- Der Steingarten der sieben Jahreszeiten in Sonne und Schatten: Arbeits- und Anschauungsbuch für Anfänger und Kenner. Verlag der Gartenschönheit, Berlin/Bern 1936
- Blumen auf Europas Zinnen mit Albert Steiner, Erlenbach – Zürich u. Lpz., Rotapfel-Verlag Zürich, 1936; mehrere Nachauflagen
- Gartenfreude wie noch nie. Kleines Gartenärgerlexikon. (= Bornimer Wegweiser – Folgeband), Verlag der Gartenschönheit Berlin/Bern 1937
- Glücklich durchbrochenes Schweigen. Verhüllte und unverhüllte Stichworte aus dem inneren Buchgetriebe. Rowohlt, Berlin 1937, Nachauflage bei Reclam, Leipzig 1940
- Gartenstauden-Bilderbuch. Verlag der Gartenschönheit Berlin/Bern 1938
- Das Blumenzwiebel-Buch. Verlag der Gartenschönheit Karl Specht, Berlin 1939
- Kleinstauden-Bilderbuch. Verlag der Gartenschönheit Karl Specht, Berlin 1939
- Lebende Gartentabellen. Verlag der Gartenschönheit Karl Specht, Berlin 1940, 3., aktualisierte Auflage, bearbeitet von Klaus Kaiser, bei Neumann-Verlag Radebeul 2011, ISBN 978-3740201401, und Eugen Ulmer Verlag Stuttgart 2011, ISBN 978-3800157846
- Kleines Bilderlexikon der Gartenpflanzen. Verlag der Gartenschönheit Karl Specht, Berlin 1941
- Von Garten, Landschaft, Mensch. Verlag der Gartenschönheit Karl Specht, Berlin 1941 (1942?)
- Blauer Schatz der Gärten: Kommende Freundschaft der Gartenmenschen mit der neuen Sphäre der Gartenfarben, dem blauen Flor der Monate von Vorfrühling bis Herbst. Reclam, Leipzig 1940; 5. Auflage, bearbeitet von Norbert Kühn, bei Eugen Ulmer Verlag, Stuttgart 2015, ISBN 978-3-8001-3385-7.
- Vom großen Welt- und Gartenspiel. Schwinn & Helène KG, Darmstadt 1950
- Neuer Glanz des Gartenjahres. Neumann Verlag Radebeul 1952 (zweite Fassung 1953). Bilder, Berichte und Erfahrungs-Tabellen aus dem Leben der winterhart ausdauernden Gewächse des Gartens. 10. Auflage, bearbeitet von Konrad Näser, bei Eugen Ulmer Verlag Stuttgart 1999, ISBN 978-3740200985
- Reise doch – bleibe doch! Lockungen kaum betretener Lebens- und Gartenpfade. Keppler und Scherrer Verlag Frankfurt/Main 1953
- Tröste mich – ich bin so glücklich. Worte aus dem Umgang mit Menschen, Pflanzen und Gärten. Furche Verlag Hamburg 1954, Nachauflagen beim Verlag Stichnote, Darmstadt
- Der Steingarten der sieben Jahreszeiten. 2. Fassung, bei Neumann Verlag Radebeul 1954
- Einzug der Gräser und Farne in die Gärten, sowie einiger bedeutungsvoller Blattschmuckstauden. Neumann Verlag, Radebeul 1956; 7. Auflage, bearbeitet von Bernhard Röllich, bei Eugen Ulmer Verlag, Stuttgart 1998, ISBN 3-8001-6365-9.
- Warnung und Ermutigung, Union Verlag, Berlin 1959, 9. Auflage bei Eugen Ulmer Verlag Stuttgart 2010, ISBN 978-3-8001-5894-2
- Ferien vom Ach. Union Verlag, Berlin 1962; 13. Auflage bei Eugen Ulmer Verlag Stuttgart 2017, ISBN 978-3-8001-0925-8
- Der Steingarten der sieben Jahreszeiten. 3. Fassung, bei Neumann Verlag Radebeul 1963, 13., erweiterte Auflage, bearbeitet von Bernhard Röllich, bei Eugen Ulmer Verlag Stuttgart 2018, ISBN 978-3-8001-5615-3
- Es wird durchgeblüht. Thema mit Variationen. Union Verlag, Berlin 1968; 8. Auflage bei Eugen Ulmer Verlag, Stuttgart 2016, ISBN 978-3-8001-0360-7
