= Weihenstephan-Triesdorf University of Applied Science =

Fachhochschule in Freising, Germany

- Hochschule Weihenstephan-Triesdorf
- Established: 1971
- President: Dr. Eric Veulliet
- Students: 6400 (2016/17)
- Location: Freising and Triesdorf, Bavaria; 48.3957°N 11.7304°E
- Website: www.hswt.de

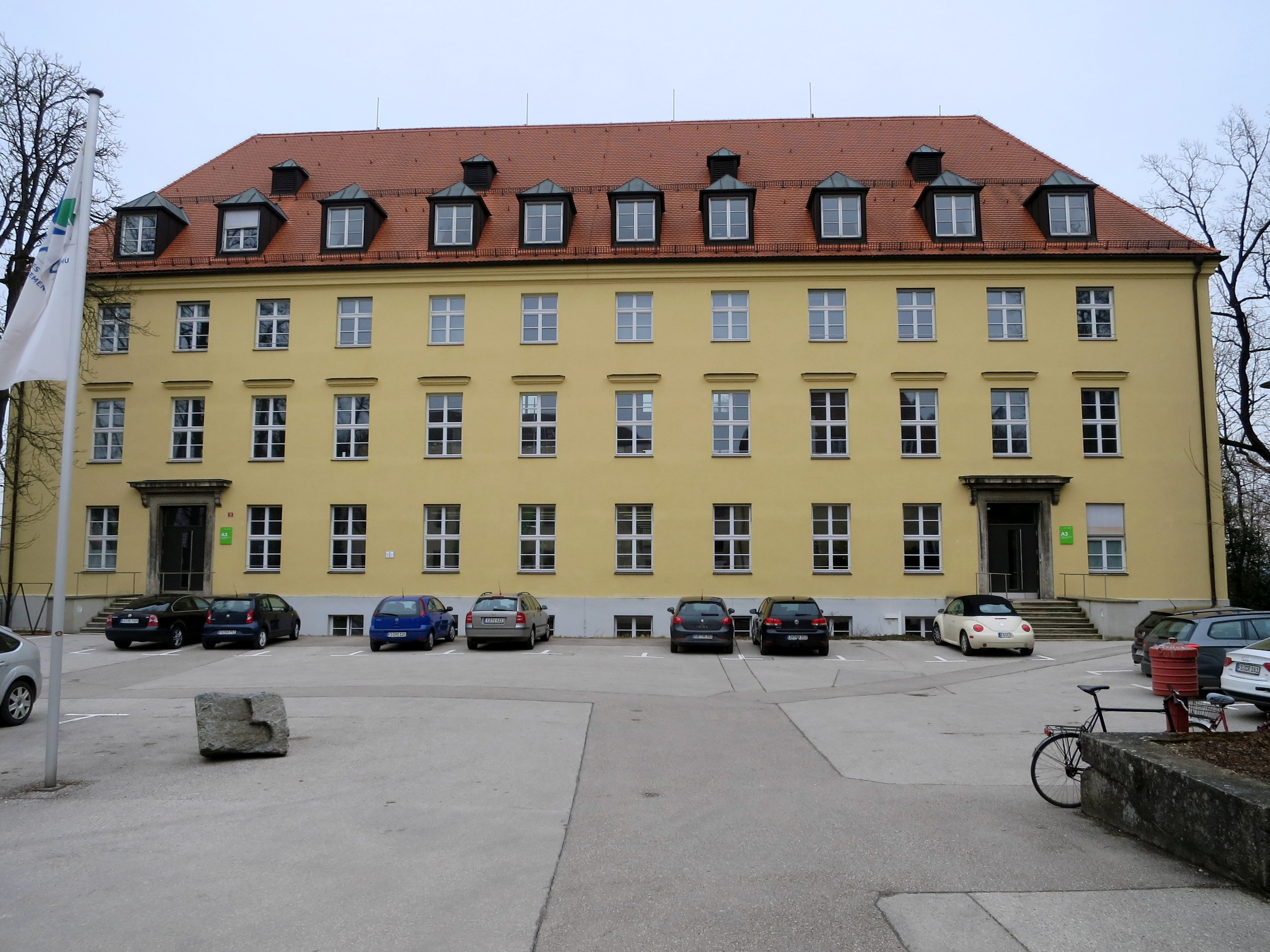
Am Hofgarten

The Weihenstephan-Triesdorf University of Applied Science (German: Hochschule Weihenstephan-Triesdorf) is a Fachhochschule in Freising, Germany.

== Facts and figures ==
=== Students (winter semester 2016/17) ===
- 6,400 students (4,200 in Weihenstephan | 2,200 in Triesdorf)
- 1,780 new students (1,180 in Weihenstephan | 600 in Triesdorf)
- 6,500 online applications

=== Staff (winter semester 2016/17) ===
- 146 professors
- 323 part-time lecturers (incl. special lecturers)
- 110 research assistants and special lecturers (full-time)
- 403 staff

=== Degree programmes ===
- 19 bachelor's degree programmes
- 13 work-study degree programmes
- 12 master's degree programmes, including:
- 4 international master's programmes

=== Departments ===
- Biotechnology and Bioinformatics
- Horticulture and Food Technology
- Landscape Architecture
- Agriculture and Food Economy
- Agriculture
- Environmental Engineering
- Forestry

=== Research ===
- 5 projects supported by the EU
- 50 projects supported by the federal government and the state of Bavaria
- 66 projects supported by external sponsors

=== International matters ===
- 80 university partnerships
- 350 international students
- German-French double degree with our partner university, Agrocampus Ouest-Centre d'Angers Weihenstephan-Triesdorf University of Applied Sciences was one of 12 German universities of applied sciences to be awarded the European seal of quality - E-Quality 2011.

== Points of interest ==
- the Sichtungsgarten Weihenstephan, Europe's leading trial garden

== Notable alumni ==
- Tessa Ganserer, German politician
