= Trial garden =

Garden for testing and evaluating plants

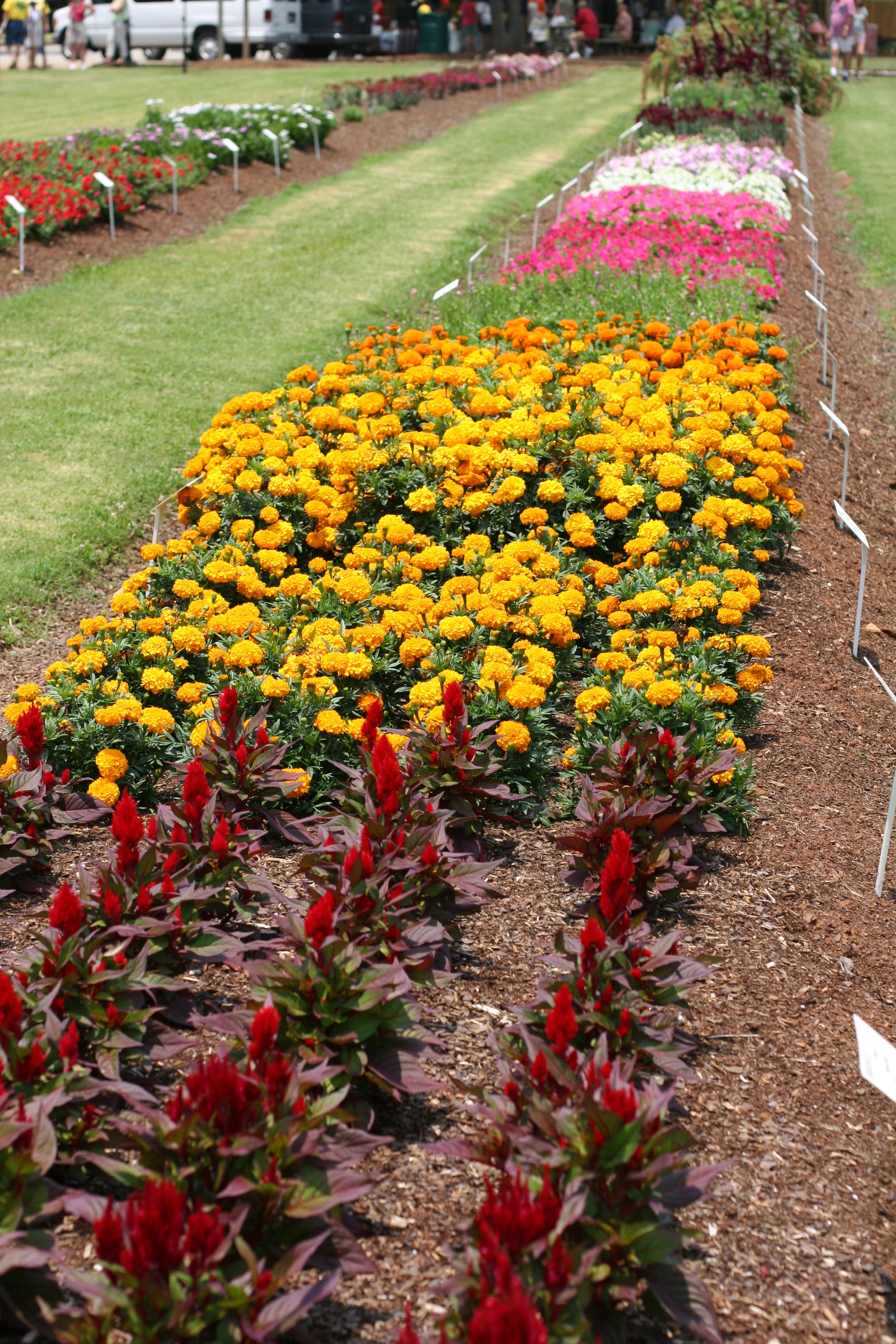
An example of an AAS trial of marigolds in the Park Seed Trial Gardens.

A trial garden is a type of garden grown specifically for the purpose of testing and evaluating plants. Universities, plant breeders, and garden-industry companies frequently have trial gardens, as do many private and public botanical gardens and professional garden journalists. In the classic trials model, newly developed varieties of plants are compared with the closest similar industry standard plant throughout their life cycle—from germination/propagation through maturity, from seed to harvest. By growing new varieties side-by-side with existing ones, researchers can determine whether these new varieties are indeed better, and, if so, in what respects.

The leading trial garden in Europe, according to English horticulturist Noel Kingsbury, is Sichtungsgarten Weihenstephan. Kingsbury describes it as "a unique institution, with no real equivalent in the English-speaking world". The Muck Crops Research Station, near Kettleby and Ansnorveldt, in Ontario, Canada, operated by the University of Guelph, tests new species and houses a plant pathology laboratory. Its focus is on plants that grow in muck soil.

Any gardener might enjoy creating their own trial garden to see which plants fare best in a specific garden environment. Most trials programs are very formal, with scientific designs including random replicated plots to minimise any risk of bias due to placement of plants. The volunteer judges evaluate entries for desirable qualities such as novel flower forms, flower colors, flower show above foliage, fragrance, length of flowering season, and disease or pest tolerances or resistance. Vegetables are judged looking for such traits as speed to harvest, total yield, fruit taste, fruit quality, ease of harvest, plant habit, disease, and pest resistance.

== Testing organisations ==
- All-America Selections (AAS). Coordinates trial gardens in more than 40 locations across the United States and Canada.
- Royal Horticultural Society (RHS). Coordinates trial gardens in the United Kingdom.

== See also ==
- List of garden types
