= Corps Rhenania Tübingen =

German collegiate fraternity

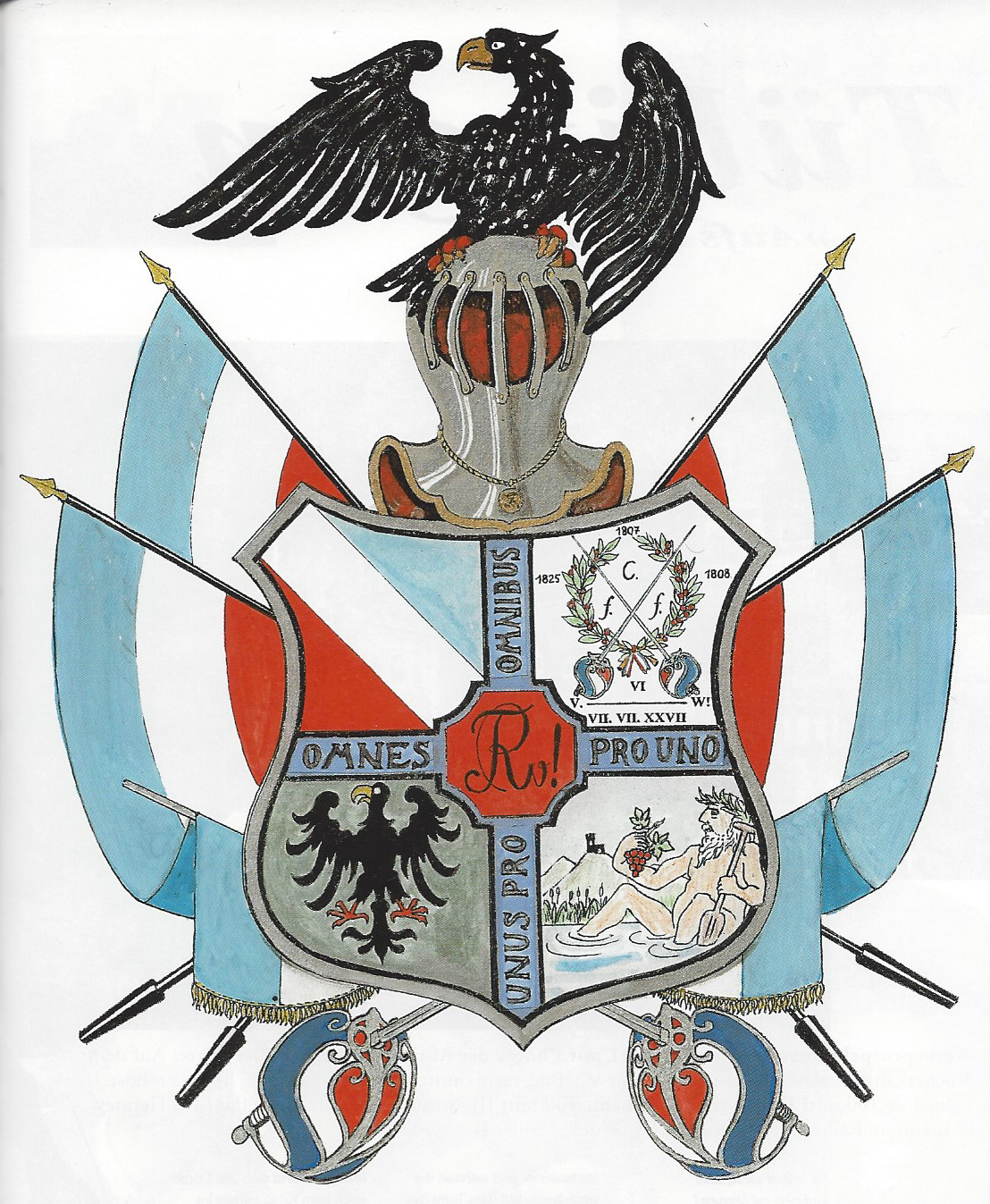
- Founded: 7 July 1827; 199 years ago University of Tübingen
- Type: Studentenverbindung
- Affiliation: KSCV
- Status: Active
- Scope: Local
- Motto: Omnes pro uno et unus pro omnibus! "All for one and one for all"
- Colors: Blue, White, and Red
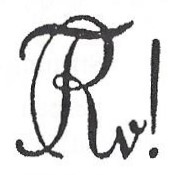
- Zirkel
- Chapters: 1
- Headquarters: Tübingen, Baden-Württemberg; Germany
- Website: www.rhenania-tuebingen.de

Corps Rhenania Tübingen is a German fraternity and member of the Kösener Senioren-Convents-Verband (KSCV), which is among the oldest fraternity associations. The Corps commits itself to a traditional kind of sport called academic fencing. It associates students and graduates of the University of Tübingen. Its members are called “Tübingen Rhenanians”.

The house of the Corps Rhenania of Tuebingen is known to be the earliest to be built to host a fraternity in Germany. It was built in 1892 and finished in 1912.

== History ==
Corps Rhenania was founded on the 7th of July 1827. The first constitution of the fraternity was reported in 1834. In 1857, it was granted admission to the KSCV, a nationwide association of Corps in Germany and Austria that had been founded just a few years earlier.

The Corps resides in a mansion that was the first to be built and dedicated to accommodate a fraternity. In the 19th century, fraternities usually assembled in local taverns where they were subject to their host's moods, and becoming independent represented a novelty to the contemporary scene. The house is located on the top of many hills guarding the old market of Tuebingen, called Osterberg. Built in 1892, it saw two more extensions to meet the demands of a flourishing fraternity community. The last extension shaped the façade as it looks today.

The Corps mourned many dead and wounded during World War I, but rising Nazi influence forced its members to shut down public membership activities to subsist clandestinely under false pretenses from 1938. After World War II was over, it was not until 1949 that the Corps reopened. Still, the house was occupied by French troops and was officially handed over in 1954. Renovations of the interior restored its traditional furniture.

Within the above-mentioned KSCV the Corps belongs to a circle that devotes itself to the blue principle. This principle is also termed social principle and comprises the promotion of gentlemanly conduct and social behaviour in general.

== Symbols ==
The fraternity's motto is Omnes pro uno et unus pro omnibus! or "All for one and one for all". Members wear a blue, white, and red ribbon around their chest as a sign of their early members' origin in combination with a blue hat. The Corps' motto is “Omnes pro uno et unus pro omnibus!” (Lat.: All for one and one for all) as well as “Concordia firmat fortes! (Lat.: unity strengthens the strong).

== Members ==
- Karl Ebermaier, Imperial governor to Cameroon 1912-1916
- Klaus Esser, former CEO of Mannesmann
- Fritz Lindenmaier, senator president to the Bundesgerichtshof (Federal Court of Justice)
- Gisbert Poensgen, retired ambassador of Germany to the European Community 1979-1985
- Ernst von Richter, DVP-politician in Prussia
- Manfred Schmidt, former CEO and supervisory board chairman of Philips GmbH
- Joachim Zahn, former CEO of Daimler-Chrysler
- Alfred-Maurice de Zayas, expert on international law
