= Hermann Uhde-Bernays =

German art historian and Germanist (1875–1965)

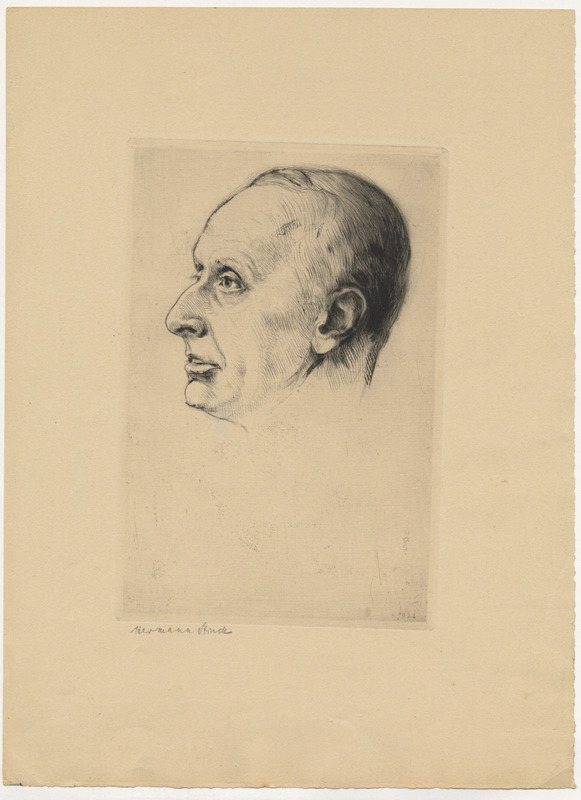
- Portrait of Hermann H.F. Uhde-Bernays (1873-1965)
- Born: October 31, 1873; Weimar
- Died: June 7, 1965 (aged 91); Starnberg
- Occupations: German Studies Scholar and Art Historian

Hermann Uhde-Bernays (31 October 1873 – 7 June 1965) was a German German studies scholar and art historian.

== Life ==
Born in Weimar, Uhde-Bernays was the son of the journalist Hermann Uhde (1845-1879) and stepson of Michael Bernays. He attended the Wilhelmsgymnasium (Munich) and passed the Abitur examination in 1893. His stepfather persuaded him to study law in Munich. However, Uhde-Bernays soon realised "that he would rather follow in his father's footsteps and in retrospect describes those Munich years as a 'lost time'." Subsequently, he engaged in German studies and art history at the Ludwig-Maximilians-Universität München, the Friedrich Wilhelm University of Berlin and Heidelberg University. In 1895, he became Corpsschleifenträger of the Corps Franconia München. In 1902, he was awarded the Dr. phil. in Heidelberg. From 1901 to 1903, he worked as an assistant at the Germanisches Nationalmuseum in Nuremberg. At this time, he also wrote theatre and art criticism for the Frankfurter Zeitung. During a trip to Italy, he decided to devote himself exclusively to writing. He settled in Munich and later moved to Starnberg. In 1914, he was appointed professor. During the National Socialist era, he was banned from writing from 1937 to 1945. He was appointed honorary professor of modern German literature at the Ludwig-Maximilians-Universität München in 1946, but rarely gave lectures. From 1951 to 1953, he was a member of the German Academy for Language and Poetry.

Uhde-Bernays moved in the circles around Frank Wedekind in his younger years. He was editor of the cultural magazines Leipziger Monatshefte and Cicerone. Uhde-Bernays was made an honorary citizen of Starnberg on 9 October 1950. He is Bernhard Uhde's grandfather.

Uhde-Bernays died in Starnberg at the age of 91.

== Publications ==
- Carl Spitzweg. Des Meisters Leben und Werk. Seine Bedeutung in der Geschichte der Münchener Kunst. Delphin-Verlag, München 1914.
- Münchener Landschaften im 19. Jahrhundert. Delphin-Verlag, Munich 1921.
- Im Lichte der Freiheit. Erinnerungen aus den Jahren 1880 bis 1914. Insel-Verlag, Frankfurt 1947.

Publisher

- Anselm Feuerbachs Briefe an seine Mutter. 2 volumes. Meyer & Jessen, Berlin 1911.
- Künstlerbriefe über Kunst. Bekenntnisse von Malern, Architekten und Bildhauern aus fünf Jahrhunderten. W. Jess, Dresden 1926.
