= KSCV =

KSCV may refer to:

- Kösener Senioren-Convents-Verband, a student fraternity
- KSCV (FM), a radio station licensed to Springfield, Missouri, United States
