= Corps Hubertia Freiburg =

German student fraternity

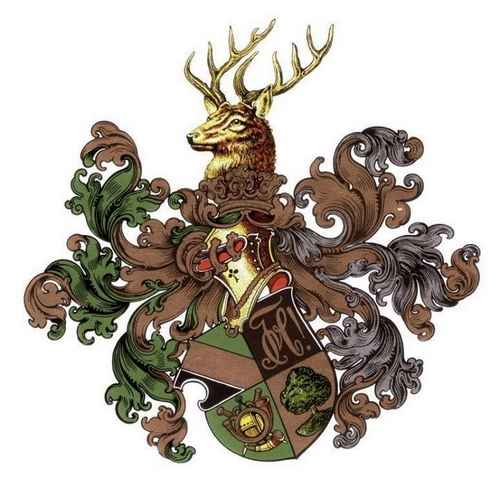
- Founded: October 29, 1868; 158 years ago University of Freiburg
- Type: German Student Corps
- Affiliation: KSCV
- Status: Active
- Scope: Local
- Motto: Concordia parvae res crescunt, discordia maximae dilabuntur
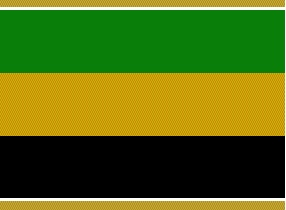
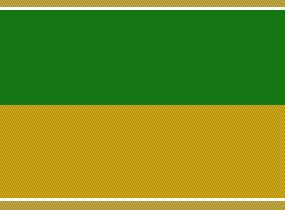
- Colors: Full members Pledge "Fuchs" members

- Zirkel
- Chapters: 1
- Members: 250 lifetime
- Headquarters: Fürstenbergstraße 23; Freiburg im Breisgau; Germany
- Website: www.corps-hubertia.de

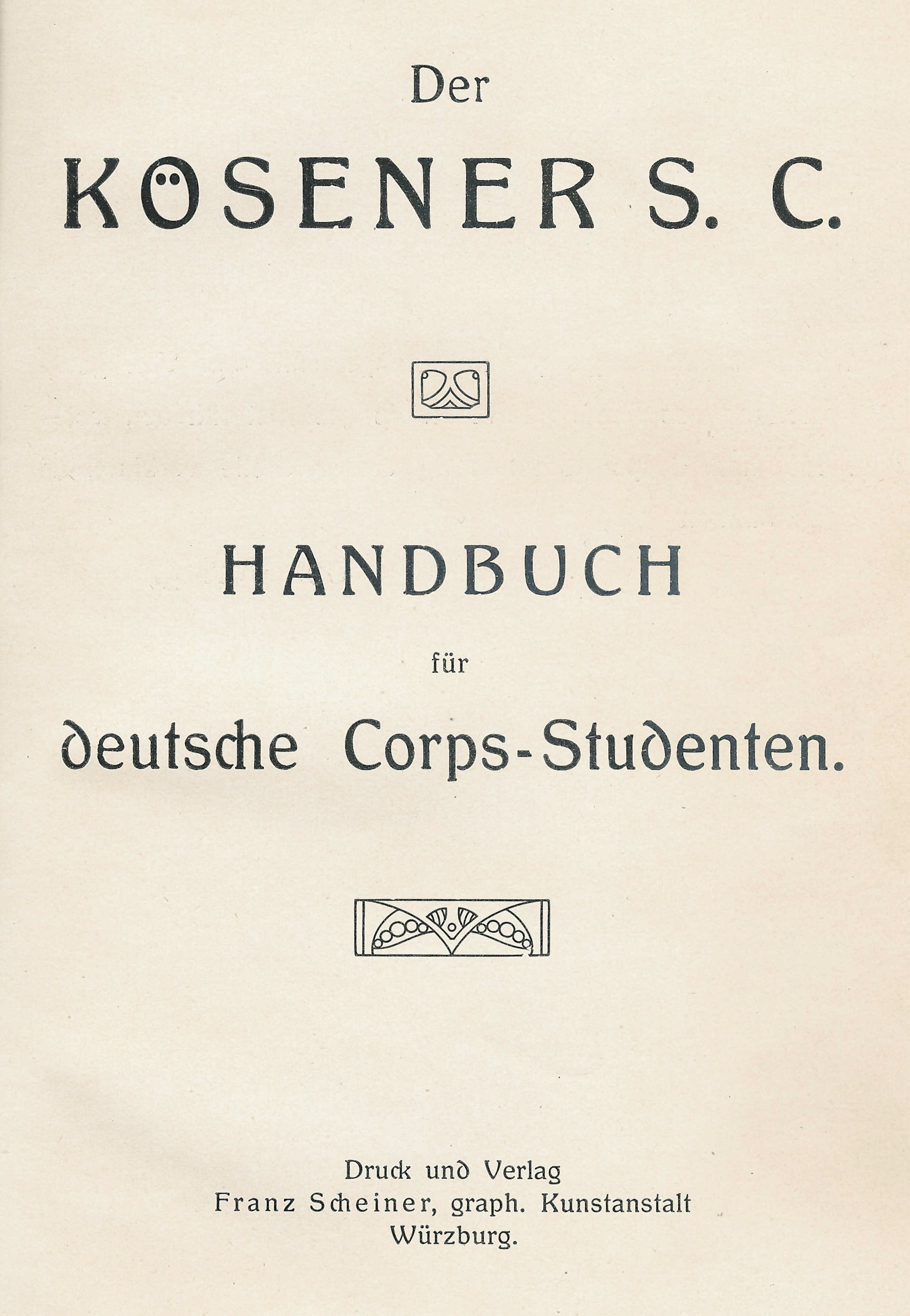
1912

The Corps Hubertia Freiburg is a fraternity (Studentenverbindung) in Freiburg, Germany. It was founded on October 29, 1868, and is one of 162 German Student Corps in Europe today. The Corps is a member of the Kösener Senioren-Convents-Verband (KSCV), the oldest federation of classical European fraternities with roots dating back to the 15th century and member fraternities across Austria, Belgium, Germany, Hungary, Latvia and Switzerland.

Membership to the fraternity is open to honorable men studying at one of Freiburg's universities and based exclusively on personality, good moral standing, and strength of character. Members of the Corps Hubertia value and engage in the tradition of academic fencing duels as a way to sharpen and prove their character under pressure. Continuing a practice dating back into the 1700s, Hubertia's members wear the traditional Couleur, colored stripes, in green-gold-black. The fraternity teaches and expects tolerance from its members, stemming from diverse ethnic, national, religious and political backgrounds. Hubertia's members are often referred to as Huberten.

Members of the fraternity controlled the forestry departments of Baden, the south-west of Germany, in a de facto monopoly from the late 1800s to the early 20th century. Many of the members today practice this heritage as passionate hunters in private and fraternity events.

== Fundamentals and principles ==
Like all Corps, Hubertia expects and practices tolerance in political, scientific and religious affairs. In historical and very general terms, German Student Corps students have traditionally been recruited from the social and nobleman elite, and appreciate the perception to be more elitist than other German student fraternities such as the Catholic Cartellverband and the right-wing or nationalist Burschenschaften. The Corps, rooted in German idealism, expect their members to rise above personal religious or political affiliations, considering tolerance and individuality to be key tenets of each individual inside and outside of the fraternity. Their general political perception is cosmopolitan and conservative in nature, yet clearly distanced from the right-wing or nationalist views of the formerly mentioned Burschenschaften.

Members of the Corps Hubertia value and practice the tradition of academic fencing duels, or "Mensur" in German, with members of other proper fraternities. Academic fencing, originating in the German school of fencing, is understood as a way to exercise good judgement and prove character, allowing the corps member to show his determination by standing one's ground under pressure, while enhancing the bonds between the corps brothers at the same time.

Hubertia's members identify themselves wearing the traditional Couleur, colored stripes, as well as caps and/or other specific garments at official occasions. This tradition known as "wearing colors" (German: Farben tragen) provides means to recognize members of other fraternities and, likewise, identification for the corps brothers with each other and their traditions.

Members are encouraged to have their own world view and be able to argue it; but Hubertia as such always remains neutral. The fraternity encourages freshly admitted (pledging "fox") members with diverse ethnic, national, religious and political backgrounds to prove themselves as valuable corps brothers, purely on the basis of personal character and merit, before becoming eligible to be fully incorporated (Rezeption).

The fraternity has approximately 255 members of all ages (including alumni) coming from or residing in Austria, the Czech Republic, Switzerland, France, Germany, South Africa, Taiwan, Turkey, and the United States. Every full member is member for life.

Hubertia's members value nature, and hunting is tradition and it provides means to spend time among Corps Brothers of high standard.

The object and purpose of the Corps was and still is solely the education of students to become a strong, free and cosmopolitan personality who is not held back by religious, racist, national, scientific or philosophical limitations of the mind. Three primary institutions within the fraternity aid with achieving this aim; including the Corpsconvent [regular council meetings of the Corps Brothers], the Kneipe [celebratory get-together of Corps Brothers with speeches, beer and songs], and today's Bestimmungsmensur [the event of academic fencing with sharp blades for the first or one of the first times], where the ones to fence are chosen on the basis of placing two equal opponents in front of each other. [...] This experience, and the intertwined need to overcome one's own fear, dedicated to the union of his Corps, and the connected strengthening of the sense of community aids the personal growth just as does taking a hit without losing one's stand and accepting the assessment of the Mensur by the own Corps Brothers.

— Hermann Rink

== History ==
=== Origins in Karlsruhe ===
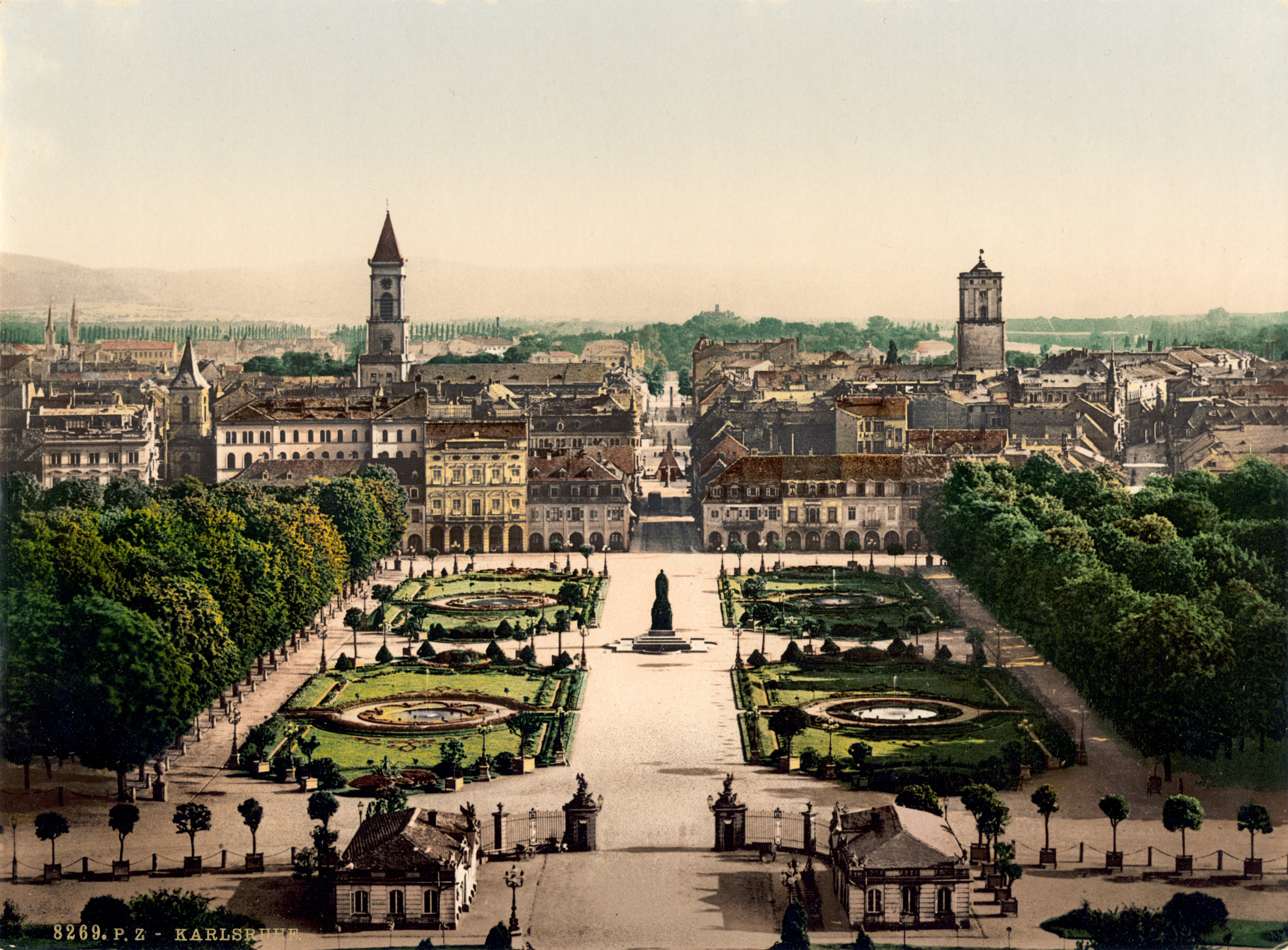
Karlsruhe around 1900

Hubertia was founded on October 29, 1868 als association among students of forestry at the university Polytechnikum der Forstschule Karlsruhe. The colors green-gold-black were chosen to represent the fraternity's principles, and initially were not yet worn openly. The slogan Concordia parvae res crescunt, discordia maximae dilabuntur (understood as "strength through unity") was defined in 1870, influencing the fraternities members' connections up to this day. Then, on Oktober 18, 1874, the fraternity was opened up to students outside of forestry and Couleur became part of every Corps brother's daily routine on Juni 7, 1875. Shortly after that, a local fencing club was established at the fraternity's location in 1876.

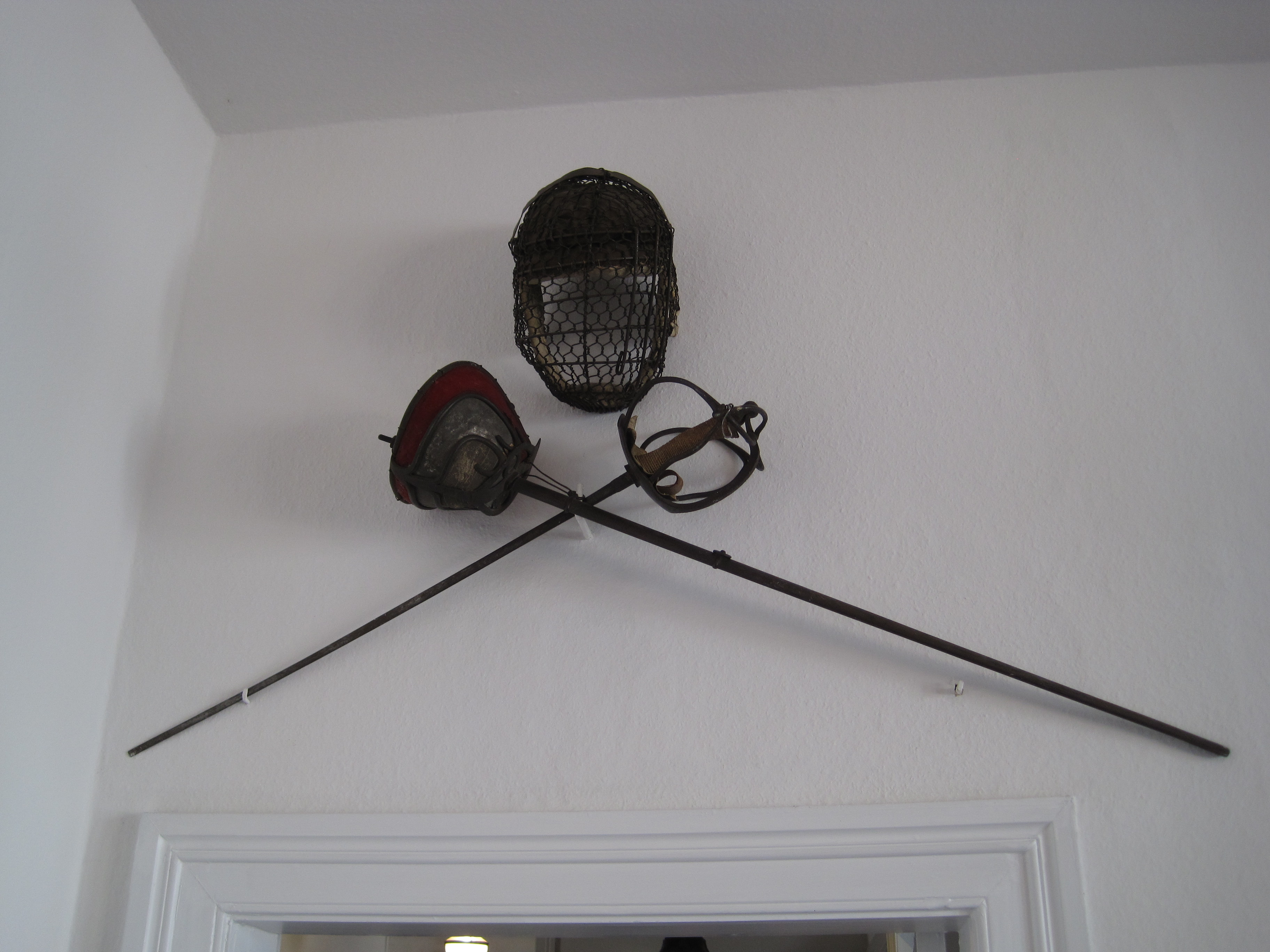
Bismarck's student sword and helmet, comparable to those used by Hubertia's members then and now

The so-called compulsory satisfaction, meaning everyone's duty to keep or regain one's honor in a fencing duel with sharp blades if challenged, became part of the fraternity's charter in 1886 and every member's tradition. This step further intensified the number and quality of academic fencing duels of Hubertia's fraternity members.

When the department of forestry moved from Karlsruhe to Freiburg im Breisgau, Hubertia settled in Freiburg and became Corps on November 27, 1920. After a short acquaintance period with the other SC-Corps in Freiburg, the Corps Hubertia became a full member of the Freiburg's league of corps (SC) on February 2, 1921.

=== Hubertia in Freiburg ===
Hubertia had 14 student members in Summer of 1920, a large number at that time, especially considering that they were all forestry students as all other members had to remain in Karlsruhe for the time being, as their departments had not moved and switching universities was a complicated procedure. The first weeks in Freiburg were filled with establishing regular meetings to celebrate or fence. Official fencing relationships, so-called Paukverhältnisse, were established with the other local Corps in Freiburg's league of corps (SC) and the fraternity Turnerschaft Markomanno-Albertia. Establishing this fencing relationship allowing regular fencing practice and duels to take place was back then the common procedure for a Corps to become a member of the local League of Corps at a university location, a tradition that has not changed to this day. This step was supported by the de:Corps Rhenania Freiburgge and Corps Suevia Freiburg who were hoping to increase the number of students from Baden (lower Germany) to counteract the rising number of students from the north of Germany in Freiburg's fraternity landscape.

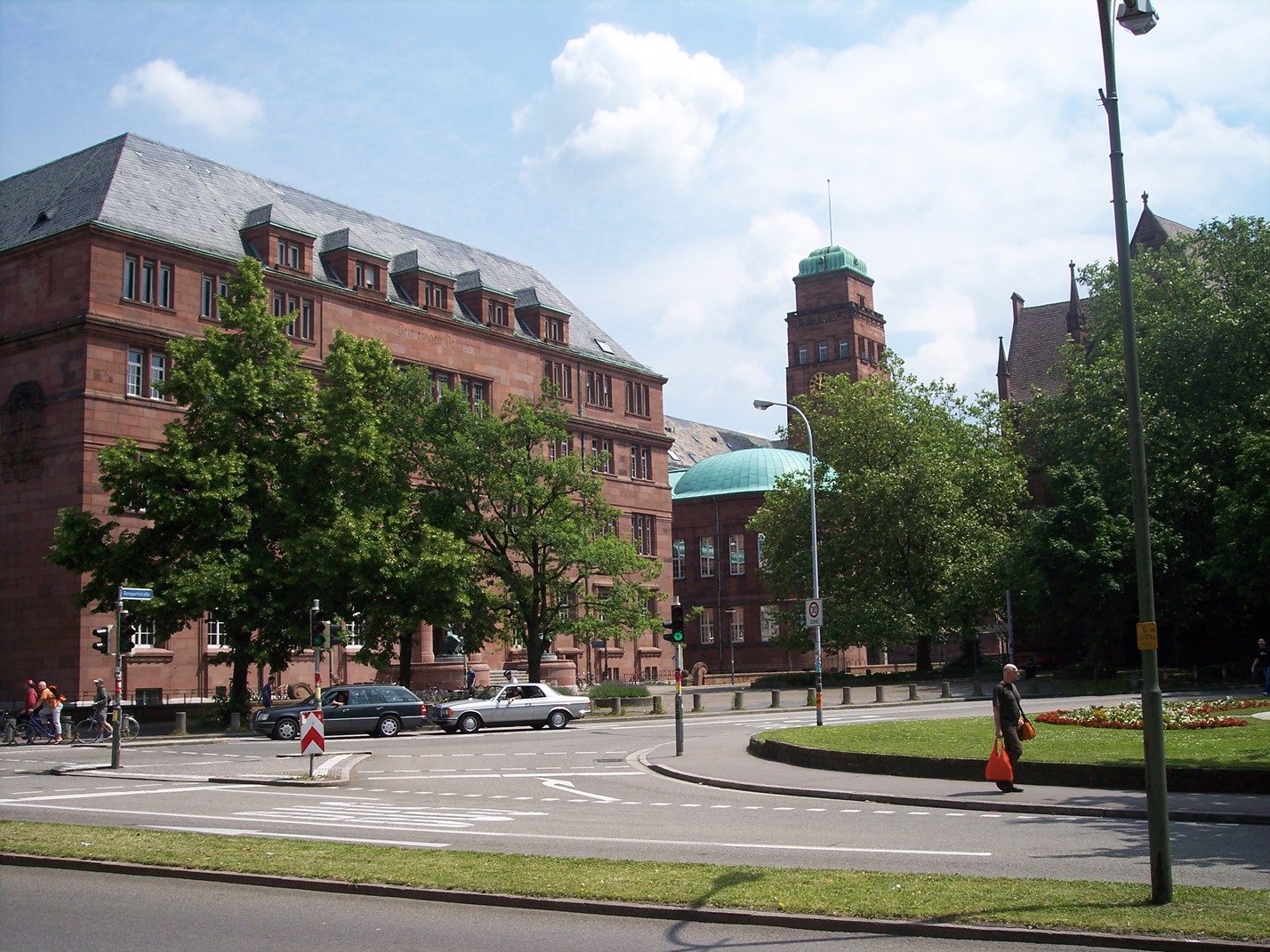
College building of Freiburg's University

The fraternity's alumni convention, Alte Herren Vereinigung in German, granted the student members' convention (Corpsburschen-Conventge), to file an application to enter Freiburg's League of Corps (SCge). Following a short period of joint gatherings and duels in academic fencing with Freiburg's other Corps as well as an inspection of Hubertia's statutes, Corps Rhenania officially requested for Corps Hubertia to become an official member of the local SC on February 2, 1921. Culminating in a grand ceremony, Hubertia thus had, 53 years after her inception, become a full member Corps of the Kösener Senioren-Convents-Verband (KSCV).

=== Struggle in Baden ===
Members of dueling fraternities (fraternities practicing academic fencing) were highly respected during the time of the German Empire, 1871 to 1918, both in general terms as well as holding public offices. This started to change slowly during times for the Weimar Republic, 1918 to 1933, even in local forestry departments. The finance minister of Baden, Heinrich Köhler, a politician belonging to the Deutschen Zentrumspartei (German Central Party), demanded openly in the state senate that "Hubertia's members are to be extinct in Baden's state forestry duties and minteries".

We need to change the current forestry establishment using an iron fist. The central government seems factually and personally ossified, driven by state arrogance and with alumni members of the fraternity "Hubertia" calling the shots, untouchable now as then, and monopolizing the general direction the state is taking. Everywhere from local to state levels having the alumni of this fraternity ensured their ability to prevent outsiders from marginalizing them.

— Heinrich Köhler

In 1920, 118 of the 227 of Hubertia's living members were men in forestry (~1/2). Of these 118, 83 held a state or private forestry office in the area of what is Baden-Württemberg today, formed by combining the former states Baden and Württemberg during the post-war area in 1952. Hence, as there were roughly 240 forestry offices in the area of Baden-Württemberg in 1920, Hubertia had members managing about 1/3 of all the forestry offices in today's state borders. Köhler wanted to minimize this high number of Hubertens. His first step was to establish a so-called Numerus clausus for forestry in Freiburg and determined personally about a prospective student's admission in person. During the following ten years, Köhler's selection had its effect on Hubertia's influence: While the fraternity provided 37 prospective forestry officers in 1920, the number fell to only six in 1938.

I very much intentionally decided to promote, and selected, catholic members for over six years.

— Josef Becker

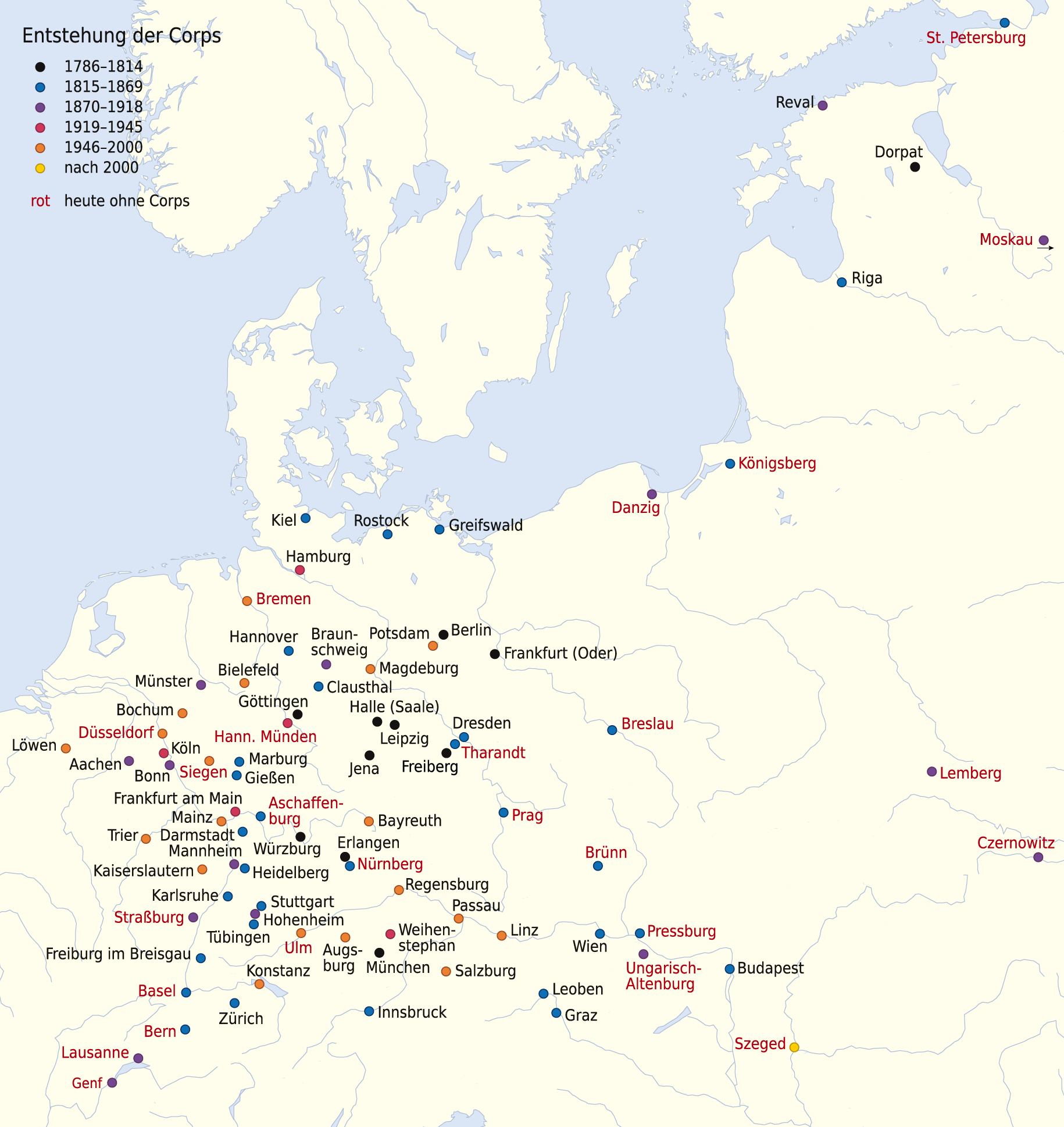
Emergence and development of the German Student Corps in Europe. Distributed over a wide range of religious and political backgrounds, the Corps always remained neutral and expected tolerance.

As this so-called culture fight was originally one between Catholics and more Protestant, Bismark-oriented and Prussia-friendly group of people, Hubertia was caught in the middle. Becker was a politician of the catholic Centrum party and openly voiced that Catholics only made it into higher offices in the area of Baden-Württemberg when they had been members of Hubertia. This can be understood as a typical statement during the cultural war (Kulturkampf) with Köhler voicing his antipathy towards the fraternity of Hubertia. On the other hand, Hasel completely disproves Köhller's view: He points out that the view of Catholics only having gotten into higher office positions if they had been Hubertia's members must be false as access to Baden's office career track was not bound by confession. Catholic forestry office applicants were not hindered on their path, which is proven by several of personnel files.

When the governing forestry manager Duke von Wiser of Meßkirch was set to become the head of the state forestry office in Karlsruhe, the then-governing manager reported on him (signed Krutina) that "he is a Catholic, but has an evangelical wife, who is daughter to a diseased forestry council head of Davans. Though he is a hunter, he does not pursue it with passion, as he lacks passion in general. So far he has done his uneasy duties well in Meßkirch and qualifies.

— Karl Hasel

This report and the catholic men mentioned for offices in forestry provide evidence that religions orientation of applicants did not influence hiring decisions in Baden's forestry department. Furthermore, there was not one of Hubertia's members within the ranks of the forestry officers mentioned in Hasel's notes. Due to that, there was no verifiable connection between an applicant's religious orientation and his connection to the fraternity of Hubertia, when he ran for a public forestry office.

The report on Duke Wiser, mentioned above, on the other hand confirms Hasels point of view: Duke von Wiser, who had been given administrative powers over the forestry department in Friedrichstal, had been a member of Hubertia since 1877. Krutina on the other hand, who originated the quoted report, was just as well a member of Hubertia. If one would assume that Kurtina sides with Wiser due to their connection within their common fraternity, then we should be able to deduct supportive words instead of criticism. What surprises though is that the report itself speaks in a critical, if not negative, tone where Krutina denies Wiser any passion for his work: He refers to him as a mediocre hunter, something that is unlikely to be said between friends portraying each other outside. If there would have been unfair connections between members of Hubertia, then Krutina's report would likely have resulted in a more positive view of Wiser and the situation.

When the position of the state's forestry minister and office head of Baden's forestry department was to be reappointed, Köhler intentionally decided against a member of Hubertia and put Karl Philipp in the position. Karl Phillip represented the so-called young forestry school and was knows to be very critical of the old establishment in Baden's forestry departments. He made many enemies with his destructive critique and his dogmatic lopsidedness, especially with his predecessors.

With Philipp's assumption of office, two fractions developed within Baden's forestry departments. The young forest school, being under Philipp's management, was supported by younger forestry officers; while none of the older ones openly sided with Philipp. With a majority of Hubertia's members belonging to the conservative and older members within Baden's forestry departments, this had to hurt long-term, as indicated in several publications and memoirs criticizing Philipps actions or workings.

From 1919 to 1936, 41 forestry officers were members of Hubertia, five of which were governors of the state forestry department and three had been the forestry president.

=== 1933 to 1945 ===
Free and open-minded student organizations were a thorn in the National Socialist party's view of the world. Before coming to power, the national socialists had instituted the National Socialist German Students' League (NSDSB) that strove to be the one and only students' association. Once in power in 1933, Hitler's party started to ban independent fraternities and sororities in Germany. Similar to other Corps, Hubertia's reaction was first to go underground and exist as a so-called "association among Freiburg's fencing circle" instead of being referred to as a Corps. As pressure increased, Hubertia's members chose the official self-liquidation (Selbst-Suspension) on May 18, 1936, to avoid discovery or annexation to the NSDSB.

To still provide means for Hubertia's Corps student and Alumni members to meet, the SC-Comradeship Hermann Löns was formed together with representatives from other Corps in Freiburg. This comradeship allowed fraternity members to remain undiscovered during congregations and to continue their practice of academic fencing, which had become strictly forbidden and could, when discovered, lead to capital punishment in Nazi Germany at that point in time. The meeting place remained Hubertia's fraternity house. While partially interrupted due to heightened pressure of Nazi espionage, fencing Mensur duels continued and even intensified from 1941 on, with over 100 of such duels happening during World War II.

=== Post-war period and Hubertia today ===
Following the war, Hubertia's alumni association was reactivated on May 20, 1946. Both, the members of the formerly established SC-Comradeship and the Association of Bremer Students (est. on Oct. 29, 1947 by members of Hubertia who had started alternative comradeships during the war) were formerly accepted into the fraternity on January 17, 1948. The students from Bremen officially moved to Freiburg that year and re-established the Studentenverbindung Hubertia not yet as Corps as these were still forbidden under Allied control. The official Allied guideline was to make sure that "nothing Nazi" would be re-established post-war and student organizations were handled with care in general. Hubertia took the following two years to establish that it was her confrontation with Nazi-Germany that led to the former dissolution by choice and underground existence. In parallel, some of Hubertia's members moved from Bremen to Marburg as Freiburg university did not yet provide certain departments that early after the war. These members helped to re-establish, or reconstitute, the de:Corps Holsatia Kielde, de:Corps Hansea Bonnde and de:Corps Suevia Straßburgde in Marburg.

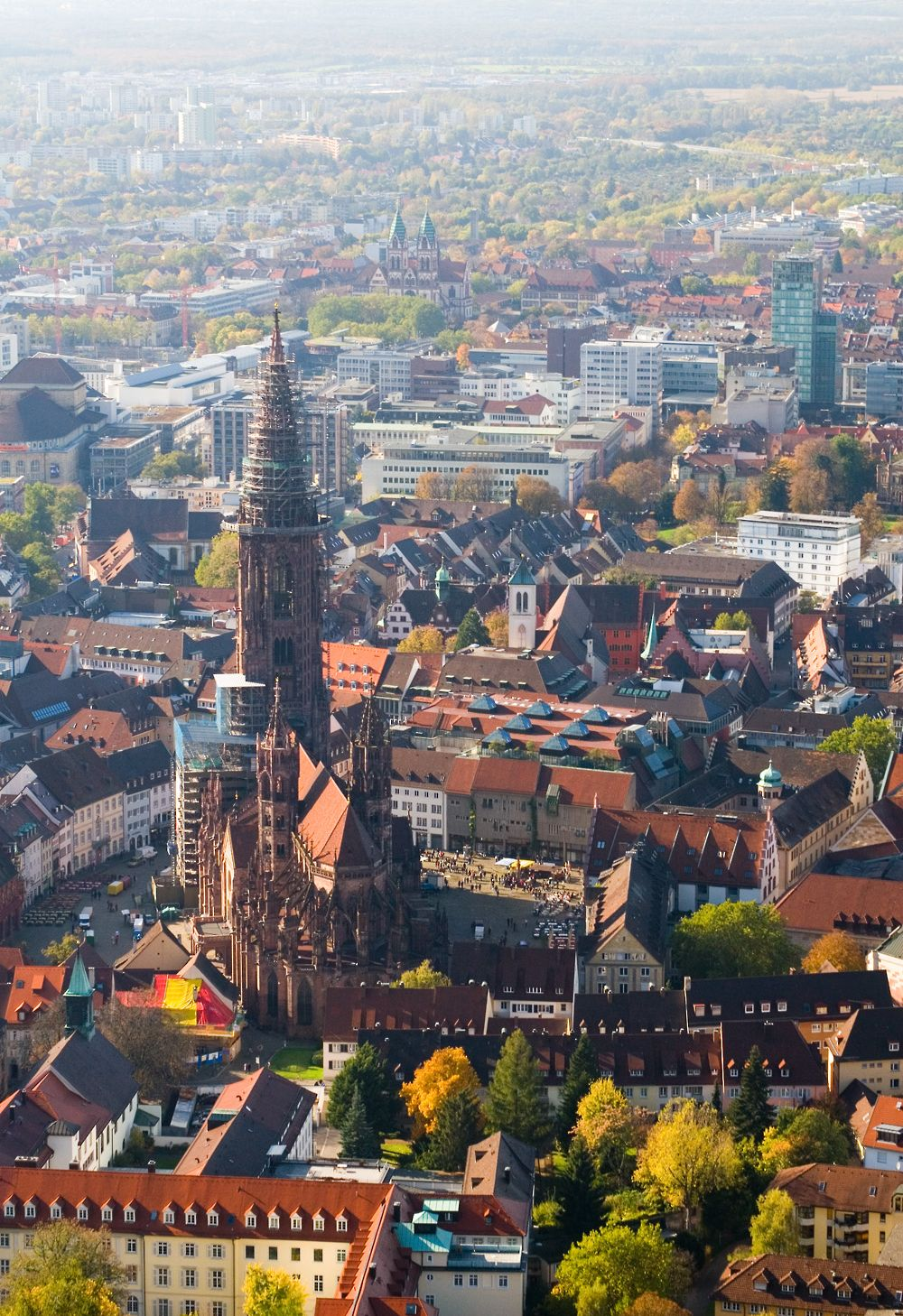
View on Freiburg im Breisgau today

On November 14, 1950, Hubertia officially took the title Corps Hubertia back on. The League of Corps SC-Freiburg reconstituted in the following year with Hubertia, Rhenania and Suevia. Next, Hubertia helped to reconstitute the KSCV at the Godesburg the same year, 1951. The next years were ones of ensuring balance and normality for fraternities in Germany again. Hubertia became the leading Corps in 1966 with Hans-Joachim Hiebsch as the president of the oKC, the official Kösen Congregation.

Today, Hubertia is the oldest fraternity in Baden-Württemberg and the second-oldest one in Germany that continues to practice a tradition of forestry and fencing. As, currently, the oldest fraternity sharing Corps Hubertia Freiburg's traditions, Corps Hubertia München is giving up on the tradition of forestry and hunting, Hubertia is set to become the oldest fraternity in Europe keeping these values alive.

When Baden-Württemberg's Minister of Justice and Vice-Ministerpresedent and Corps Hubertia's alumni Ulrich Goll [de] was interviewed by local and national media about his relationship to guns, media focused on his fraternity background too and the value that hunting has in our society.

\

== Symbols ==
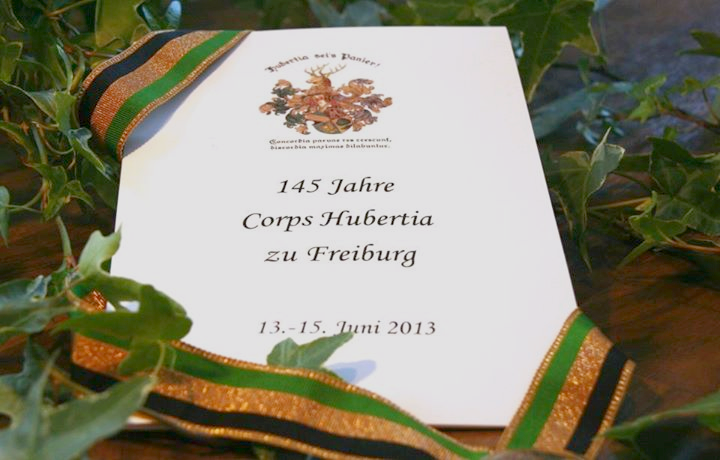
Hubertia's colors winding around the invitation to the 145th anniversary

Hubertia defined its fraternity colors green-gold-black on February 7, 1897. These colors are worn in the form a ribbon with a golden percussion (rim) diagonally across the chest, as it is typical for European fraternities. The common fraternity cap is the green Tellermütze or the more traditional Stürmer in dark-green. The freshly admitted (pledging "fox") members wear the two-colored ribbon in green-and-gold. To official fraternity events, some members might additionally wear a traditional green jacket, an adapted version of the contemporary chief forester's jacket typical for the Elsass, a former German region bordering France. This jacket is then combined with a Hirschfänger, a specific style of hunting dagger, on the side.

The slogan Concordia parvae res crescunt, discordia maximae dilabuntur ("concord will make small things flourish, discord will destroy even the greatest") was adapted on August 23, 1870. It still defines the fraternity members' association with each other and the way things are managed inside, as well as outside the fraternity, today.

== House in Freiburg and the Lodge in the Black Forest ==
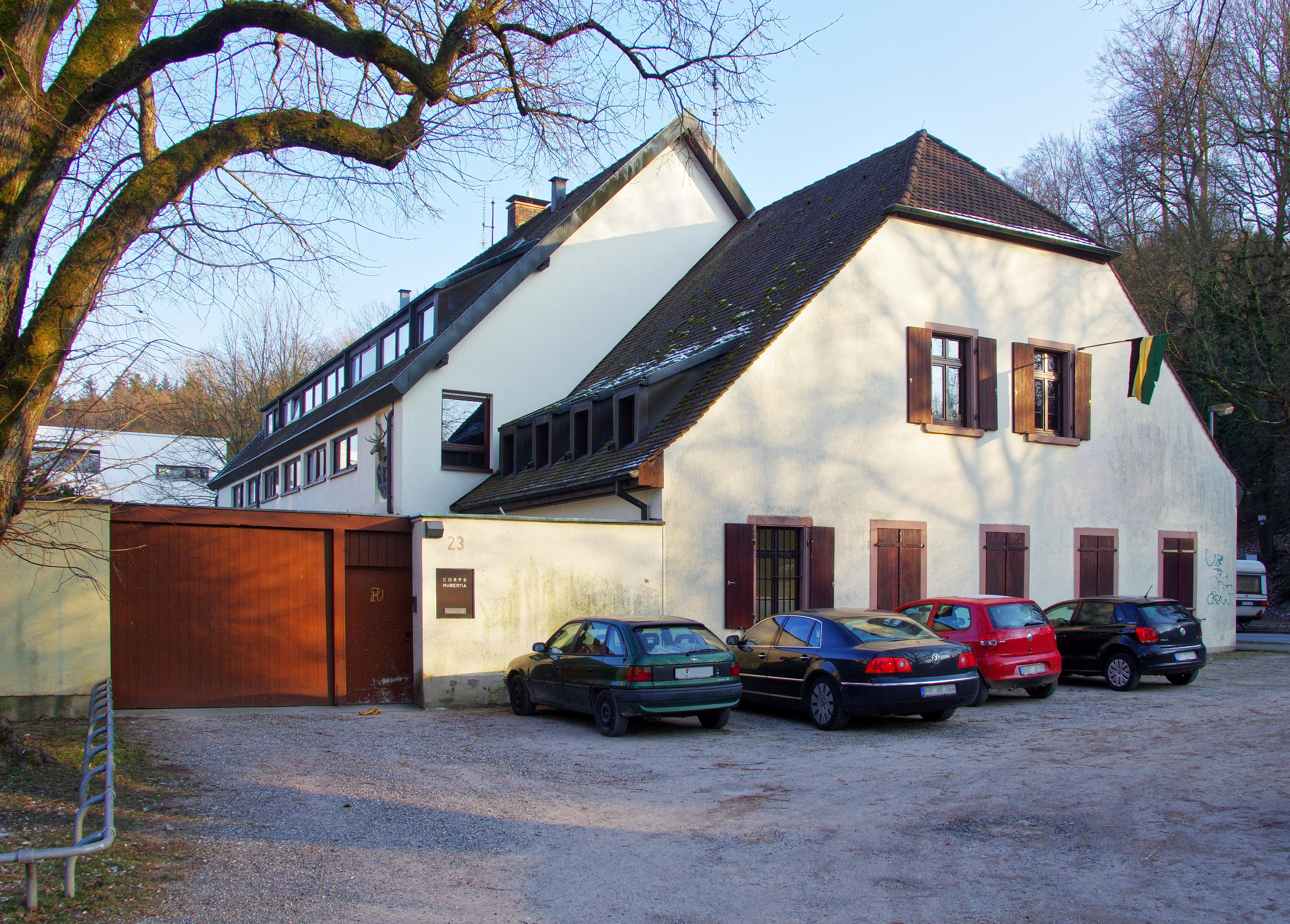
Hubertia's house (side view)

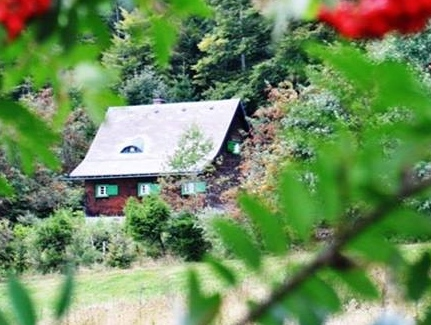
Hubertia's lodge

The original house in Freiburg "Zum Felsenkeller" was bought on Schlossbergstraße 7 in 1921 and served the fraternity through the troubled times before, during and shortly after WW II. The house was then torn down in 1968 and replaced with a new house at Fürstenbergstraße 23 in the south of Freiburg.

Many fraternity members pay regular visits to the lodge higher up in the Black Forest mountains near Freiburg. Traditionally, the last hour of the hike is done around sun-down to soak up what nature has to offer from dusk 'till dawn. The lodge provides means for relaxation, recreation and meditation without iPhones and computers.

== Notable members ==
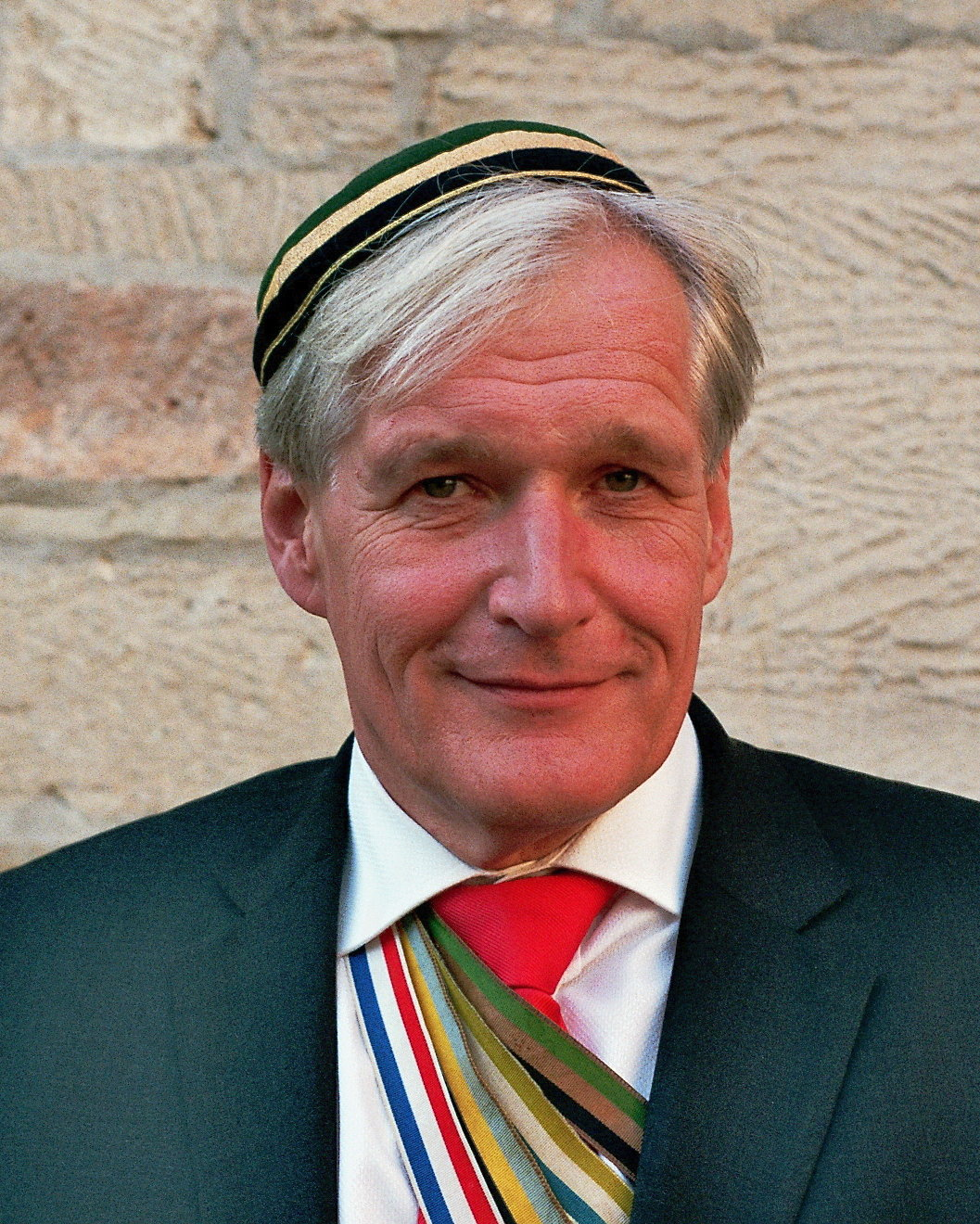
Alexander Hartung, President (2012–2015) of the Verband Alter Corpsstudenten (VAC), the alumni organization for the KSCV, became a Corps Student first as Huberte in Freiburg.

In alphabetic order. Links to the German Wikipedia are in process of being translated and currently indicated with "ge".
Part of the more comprehensive list of German Student Corps members.

- Otto Nüsslin (1850–1915), Zoologist at the TH Karlsruhe university; for further information see Otto Nüsslin ge.
- Hans Albrecht ge (1923–2006), Vice president of Baden-Württemberg's state parliament
- Otto Ammann ge (1879–1933), Rector (president) of the TH Karlsruhe university
- Dieter Ammer ge (born 1950), Managing board member at Tchibo Holding AG
- Ulrich Ammer ge (born 1934), Forestry scientist, editor of the Forstwissenschaftlichen Zentralblatt
- Armin Berninghaus ge (born 1938), Managing board member at Westfalen AG
- Fritz Eichhorn ge (1870–1939), Principal forest officer
- Ulrich Goll ge (born 1950), Vice Prime Minister and justice minister for Baden-Württemberg
- Hans Hausrath ge (1866–1945), Forestry scientist
- Otto Henninger ge (1885–1966), Engineer
- Günter Joetze ge (born 1933), ambassador for Germany
- Johann Krieger ge (born 1949), Mayor of Ehingen (Donau area in Germany)
- Erich Ullmann ge (1892–1965), Council of States for Thurgau in Bern (Switzerland), Lieutenant-Colonel at the Swiss general staff headquarters during WW II
- Wolfgang Wechsler ge (1930–2012), Neuropathologist, professor in ordinary in Düsseldorf
- Jürgen Winkler ge (born 1958), Neurologist and Neurobiologist
- Erich Würfel ge (born 1926), District chief executive in Rastatt

== Recipients of the Klinggräff-Medal (Klinggräff-Medaille) ==
The Klinggräff-Medal is awarded for the combination of extraordinary accomplishments in academia, involvement for the fraternity and proven leadership on local and, preferentially, national level. An average of five medals is awarded each year nation-wide, chosen by a joint alumni committee of KSCV and WSC representatives. The award indirectly reflects back at the fraternity, showing leaders in their field among the fraternity's brothers. For more information see Klinggräff-Medaille ge at the Association of German Student Corps Alumni ge.

Recipient of the Klinggräff-Medal for Corps Hubertia is:

- Manfred Franke (2009)

== Unique features of Corps Hubertia: fencing, firearms and friendship ==
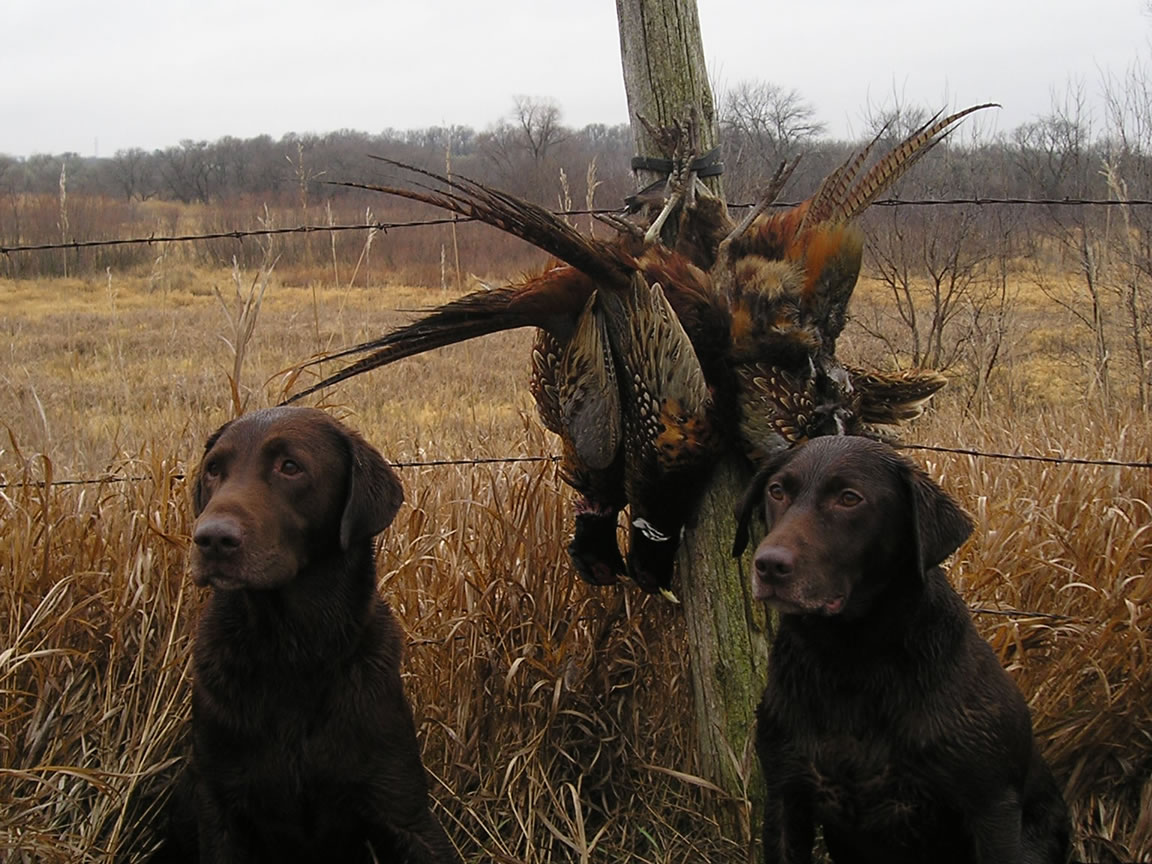
Hunting dogs with pheasants

Hubertia's members are - quite literally - Brothers in Arms. Be it the proper handling of a fencing blade under the psychological and physical strains of the Mensur or the correct management of a hunting rifle out in the field; be it hunting as a team or deerstalking in a dusky Sunday evening, followed by hours spent together near the campfire: Hubertia provides some of life's experiences in its purest form.

A Corps Alumni's (Alter Herr) ge hunting school offers courses to obtain the hunting license, with classes taking place at the fraternity house. This license, colloquially referred to as the "Green Diploma" does take about half a year of work and covers information from flora and fauna to legal and safety issues as well as the proper way to handle and successfully apply firearms, in essence delivering a "forestry light" course. Most of the participants are students at the local universities, studying subjects from Algebra over Medicine, and Law to Engineering.

Hunting in general and the experience with other Corps brothers specifically has a very high standing within the fraternity. Many of the alumni provide the hunting location and hospitality to members as well as invited guests, often organizing joint events with the younger members from Freiburg. The tradition strengthens bonds across different age groups and usually forms and deepens lifelong friendships.

Corps form relationships with each other that are the basis for regular visits and various forms of support between the fraternities. One of Hubertia's relationships, yet, is an exceptional one: The bond formed with the Corps Friso-Cheruskia (WSC) in Karlsruhe established a bridge between the two main Corps associations, the KSCV and the WSC. This bridging bond is unique for all Corps in Europe. Hubertia continued to form relationships with like-minded Corps, as elaborated in the following section.

== Relationships with other Corps ==
In chronological order. Links to the German Wikipedia are in process of being translated and currently indicated with "ge".

- Corps Friso-Cheruskia Karlsruhe im WSCge., "Traditionsverhältnis" since 1920
- Corps Schacht Leobenge., "befreundetes Verhältnis" (2002)
- Corps Guestphalia et Suevoborussia Marburgge., "befreundetes Verhältnis" (2010/1978)
- Corps Hubertia Münchenge., "Vorstellungsverhältnis" (1975)
- Corps Franconia Würzburgge., "Vorstellungsverhältnis" (2008)

== Gallery ==
Impressions of Corps Hubertia's traditions outliving the times from the 19th to the 21st century.

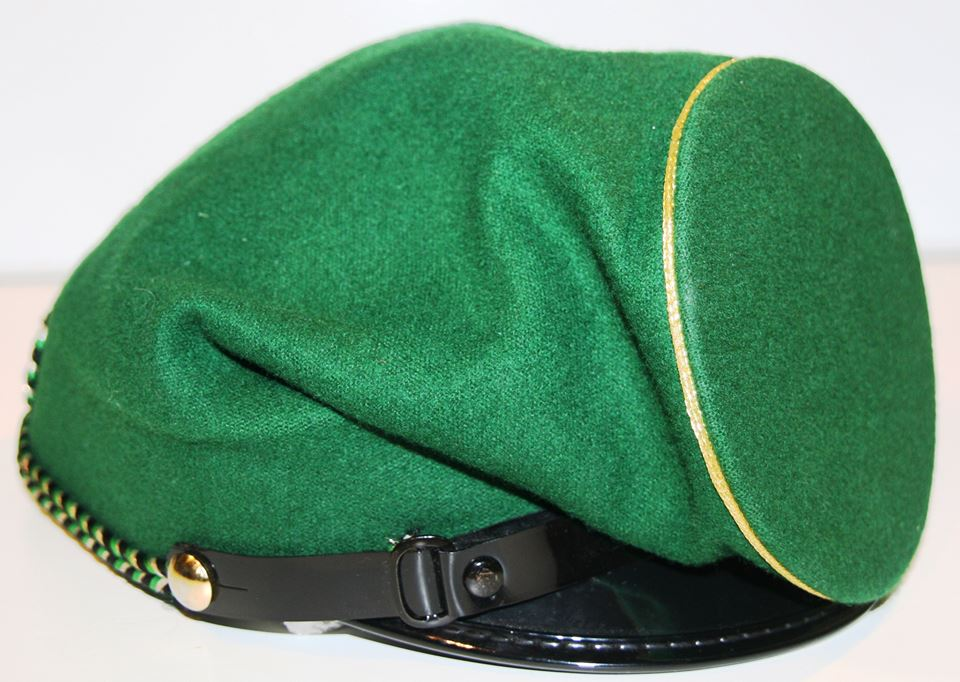
The traditional Stürmer, one of the fraternity's two contemporary hats

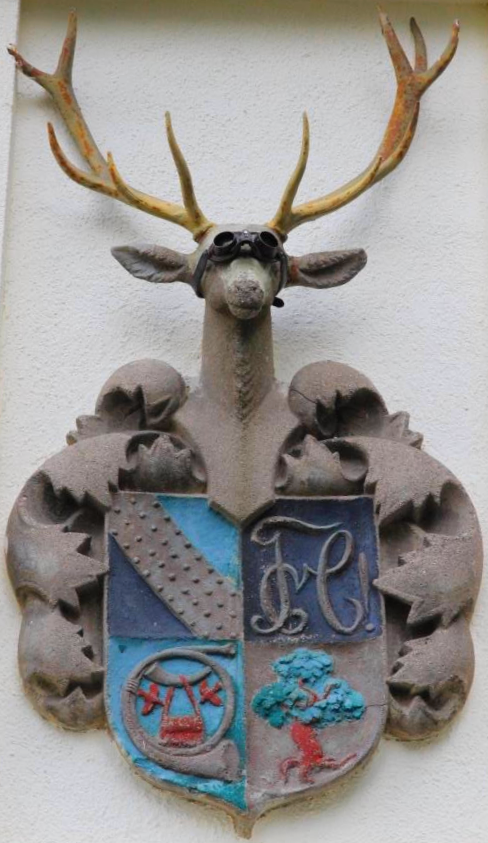
Corps Hubertia's old crest on the side of the current house of the fraternity. Here temporarily wearing fencing goggles during the 145th inaugural celebration.

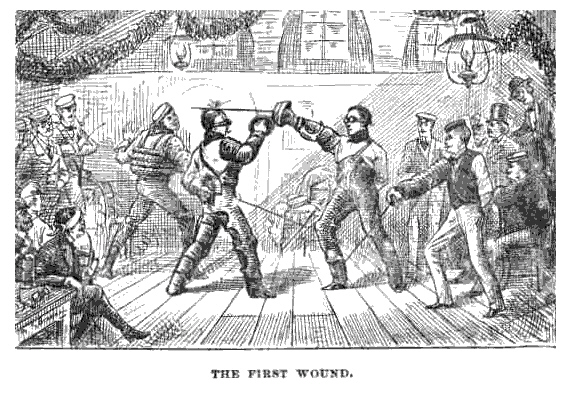
"The First Wound", Illustration zu Mark Twains A Tramp Abroad, 1878/1880. Some things don't change.

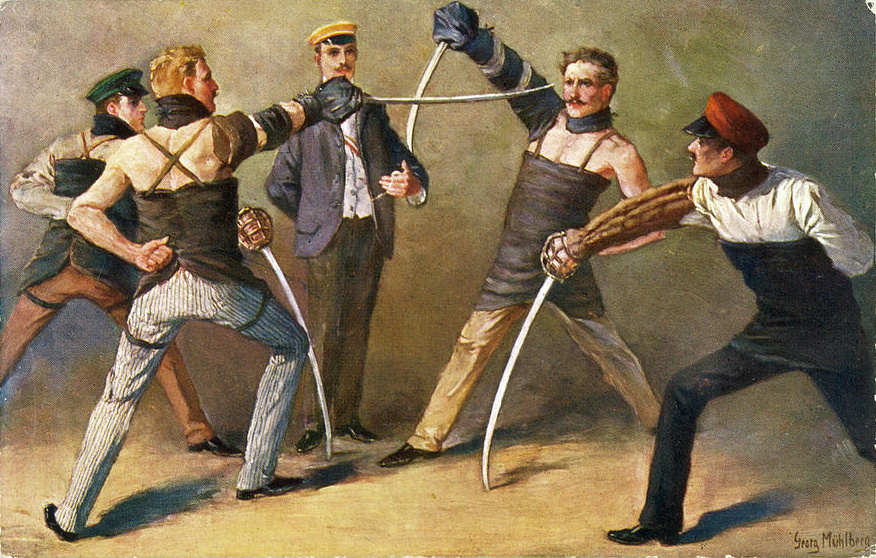
Georg Mühlberg: Student sabre duel around 1900.

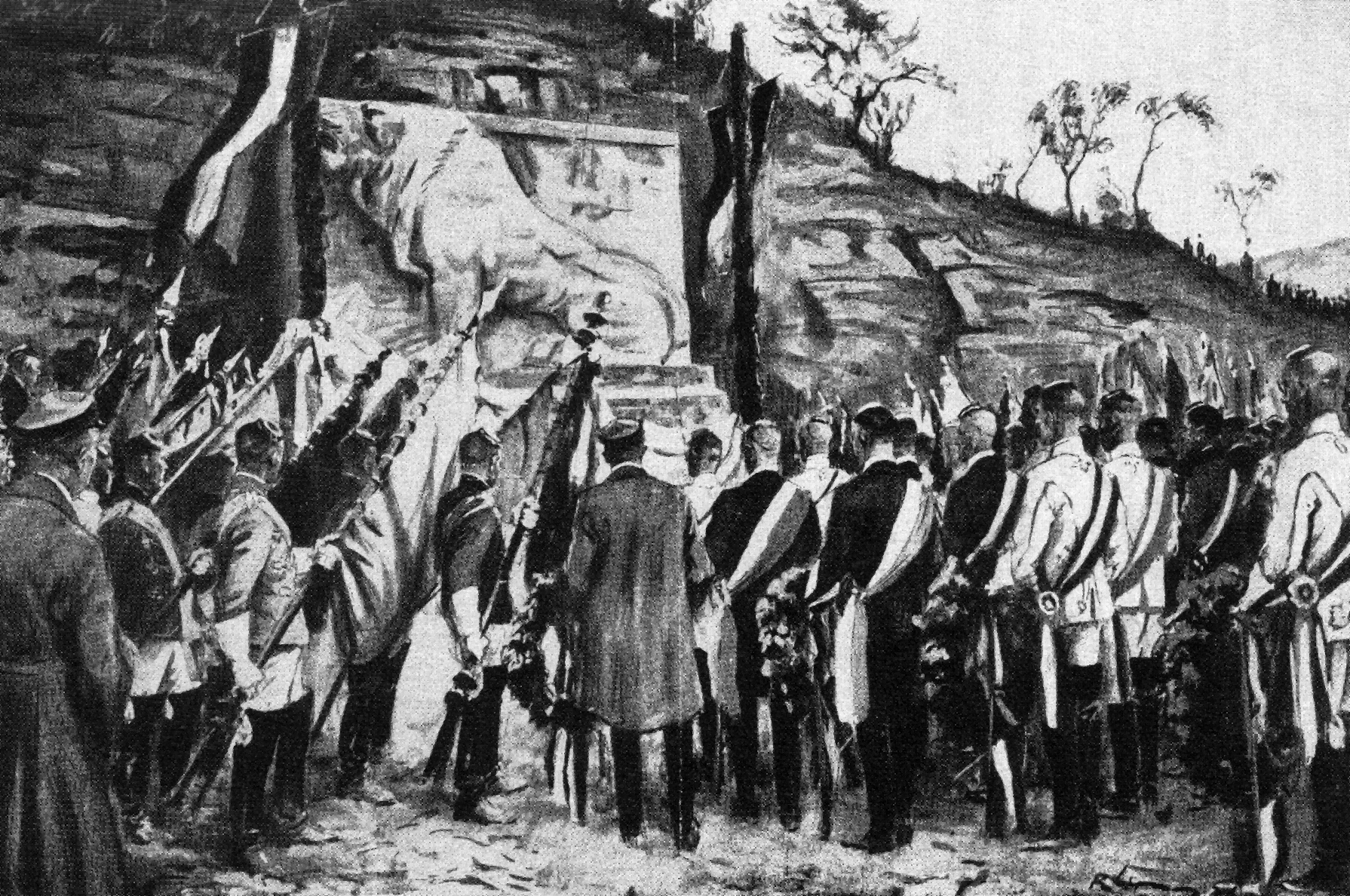
The Lion-Memorial of the KSCV. Inauguration of the memorial, representing fallen Corps Students in World War I.

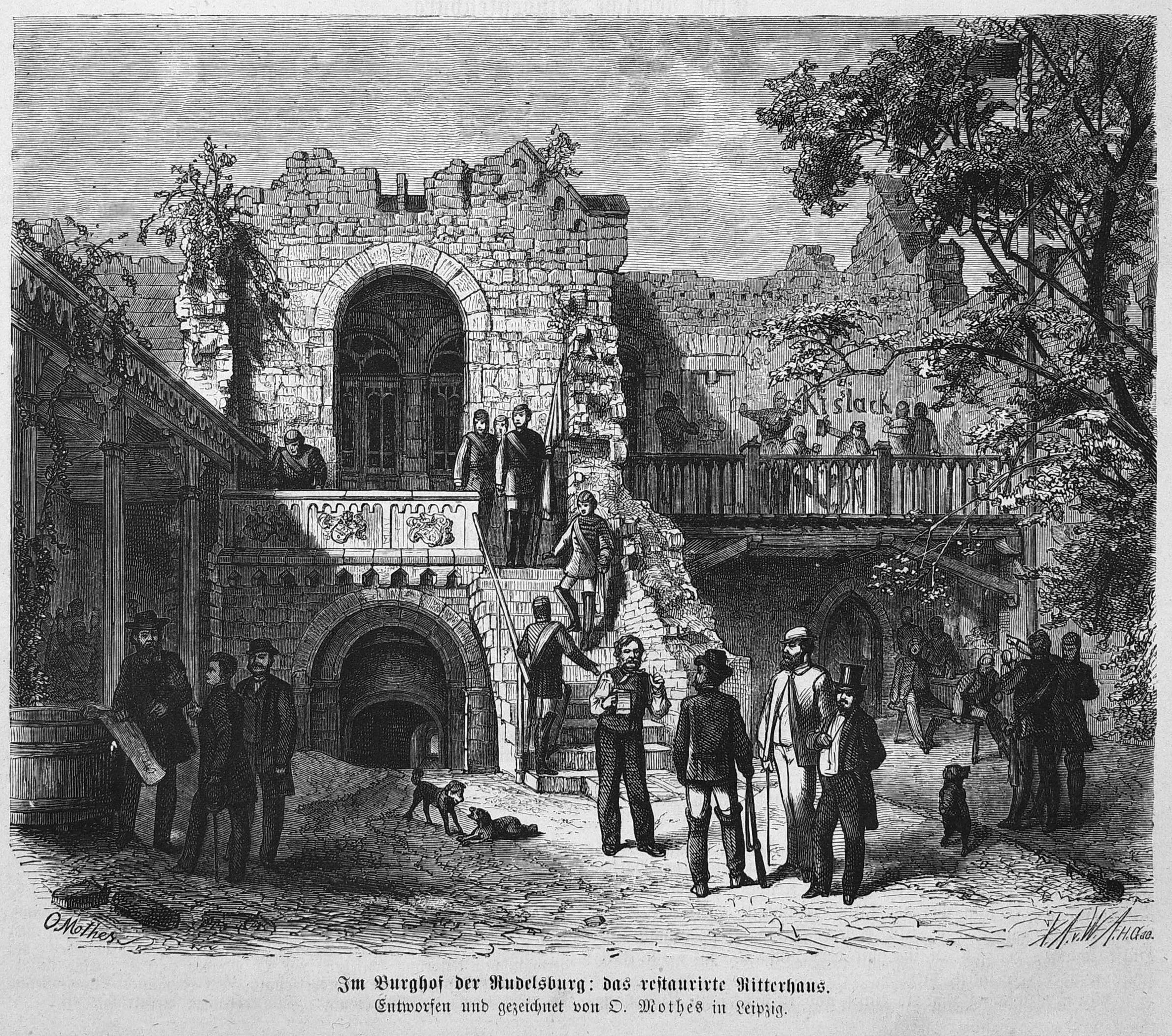
Contemporary view into the castle Rudelsburg, traditional and current meeting point for all KSCV Corps Students once a year

== See also ==
- The Enlightenment
- Integrity
- List of members of German student corps
- Prussian virtues

== General and cited sources ==
- Lees Knowles: A day with corps-students in Germany
- Mark Twain describes his encounters with German corps students in chapters IV to VII of his travelogue A Tramp Abroad.
- Mark Twain describes specifically the fencing scene in A Tramp Abroad.
- Secondary web source of Mark Twain's descriptions of his encounters with German corps students in chapters IV to VII of his travelogue A Tramp Abroad.
- LaVaque-Manty, Mika (2006). "Dueling for Equality: Masculine Honor and the Modern Politics of Dignity" (PDF). Political Theory. 34 (6): 715–740. doi:10.1177/0090591706291727. S2CID 143261653.
- LaVaque-Manty, Mika (2006). "Dueling for Equality: Masculine Honor and the Modern Politics of Dignity" (PDF). Political Theory. 34 (6): 715–740. doi:10.1177/0090591706291727. S2CID 143261653.
- Gay, Peter (April 1992). "Mensur: The Cherished Scar". The Yale Review. 80 (1–2). ISBN 9780393033984.
- Markus M. Neuhaus: Korporierte Forstleute im badischen Staatsdienst – ein Monopol der Freiburger Hubertia?, in: de:Sebastian Sigler (Hg.): Die Vorträge der 72. Deutschen Studentenhistorikertagung Freiburg im Breisgau 2012. Essen 2013, S. 167–212, ISBN 978-3-939413-32-5
- de:Paulgerhard Gladen: Die Kösener und Weinheimer Corps. Ihre Darstellung in Einzelchroniken. WJK-Verlag, Hilden 2007, ISBN 3-933892-24-4, S. 91–92.
- Frank Pohlmann: Das Jagdhorn im Wappen. Beim Corps Hubertia besitzt die Jagd hohen Stellenwert., in: Die Pirsch, 2005, Heft 18, S. 26
- Peter Lindemann: Hubertia im Dritten Reich. Celle 1998, ISBN 3-930374-14-5
- Rolf-Joachim Baum: "Wir wollen Männer, wir wollen Taten!" – Deutsche Corpsstudenten 1848 bis heute. Berlin 1998, S. 7–12. ISBN 3-88680-653-7
- Corps Hubertia Freiburg, Studentische Verbindungen und Jagd, in: Die Pirsch, 09/1993, S. 93
- Georg Brautlecht, de:Karsten Bahnson: Hubertia Freiburg im Dritten Reich und ihre Nachkriegs-Rekonstitution zunächst in Bremen. Einst und Jetzt 34 (1989), S. 167–170.
- Christian Wehle: Chronik der Freiburger Huberten 1868–1978. 1979
- Josef Becker: Heinrich Köhler Lebenserinnerungen des Politikers und Staatsmannes 1878–1949. Kohlhammer Verlag, Stuttgart 1969.
- Fritz Eichhorn: Das badische Forstgesetz und seine Erneuerung. AFJZ 105 (1929), S. 401–415.
- Fritz Eichhorn: Forstpsychologisches aus Baden Eine kritische Betrachtung der fachlichen und persönlichen Verhältnisse in der heutigen badischen Forstverwaltung. Karlsruhe (1930).
- Fritz Eichhorn: Bilanz der Jahre Philipp. AFJZ 108 (1932), S. 245–265.
- Otto Eberbach: Forstliches aus Baden. Dt. Forstwirt 8 (1926), S. 13–16.
- Wilhelm Karl Friedrich Hamm: Badens junge Schule. AFJZ 86 (1910), S. 381–384.
