= Corps Palatia Munich =

German fencing fraternity

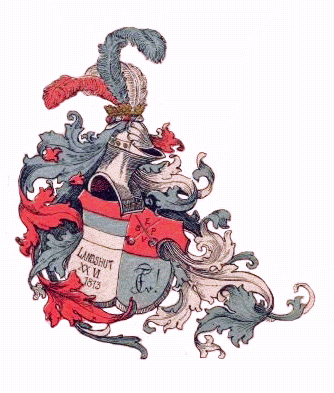
- Founded: 20 June 1813; 213 years ago LMU Munich
- Type: Studentenverbindung
- Affiliation: KSCV
- Status: Active
- Emphasis: Fencing
- Scope: Local
- Motto: Fortuna virtutis comes! "May fortune be with the courageous"
- Colors: High red, King's blue and Silver white
- Zirkel
- Chapters: 1
- Members: 150 active
- Headquarters: Königinstraße 49; Munich, Bavaria 80539; Germany
- Website: corps-palatia.de

Corps Palatia Munich (German: Corps Palatia München) is a fencing fraternity belonging to the Kösener Senioren-Convents-Verband, the oldest association of German and Austrian student corporations. It unites students of Munich's universities, most notably LMU Munich and the Technical University of Munich. Palatia's members are known as Pfälzer, which is derived from the Bavarian region of Upper Palatinate (“Oberpfalz” in German).

Corps Palatia is a “pflichtschlagend” fraternity, requiring all members to participate in academic fencing duels (“Mensur” in German) with the members of other student fencing fraternities. It is also “farbentragend,” meaning the corp's members wear colored sashes as well as hats or other uniforms at official occasions.

The corps currently has approximately 150 members of all ages (including alumni) coming from Austria, the Czech Republic, France, Germany, Russia, South Africa, Spain, and the United States.

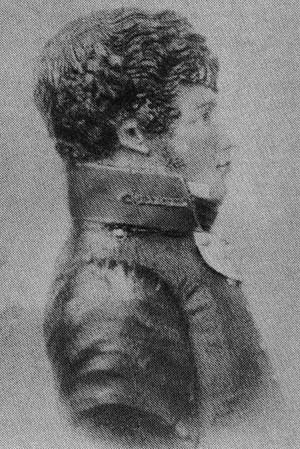
Founding President Gottlieb Meinel

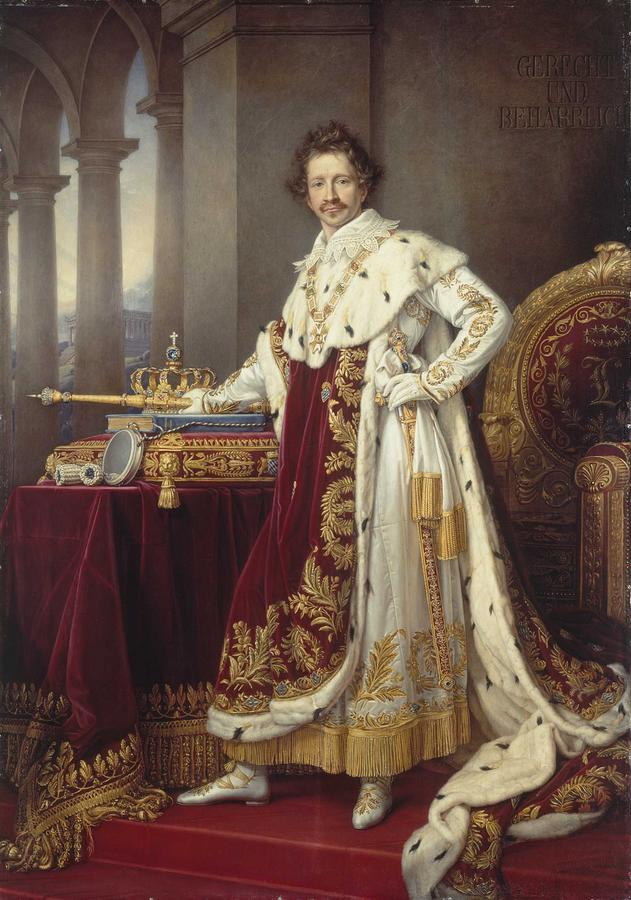
Portrait of Ludwig I of Bavaria by Joseph Karl Stieler

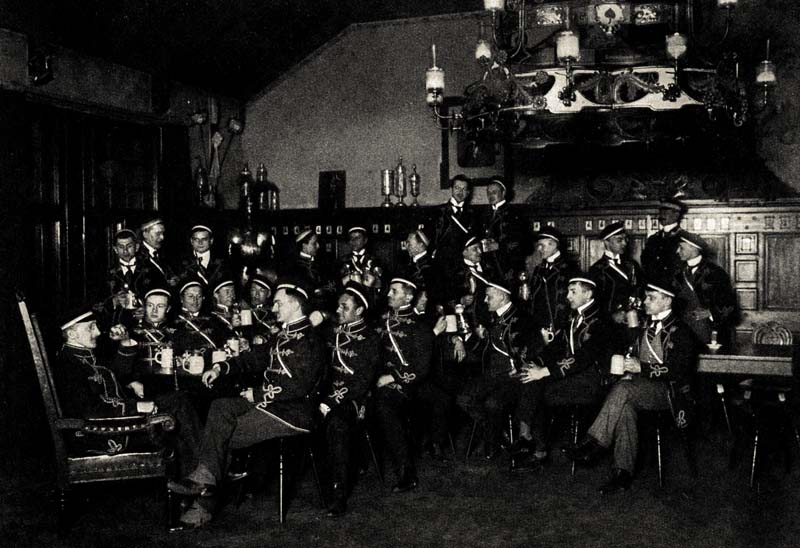
Corps Palatia in 1913

== History ==
On June 20, 1813, Palatia was founded in Landshut, Bavaria by a group of students from Upper Palatinate led by Gottlieb Meinel, who was also the fraternity's first president.

The Corps moved to Munich from Landshut along with LMU Munich in 1826, following the relocation of the university by King Ludwig I of Bavaria.

=== Lola Montez Affaire ===
Palatia played a significant role in the unfolding of the revolutions of 1848 in Bavaria, due to its involvement in the scandal revolving around a young dancer named Lola Montez. Montez came to Munich in 1846 and quickly became the mistress of aging King Ludwig I of Bavaria. Despite her relationship with the king, she was rejected by Munich's citizens, who despised her arrogance towards the city's population and influence on the King.

In 1847 it became clear that Montez was having a sexual relationship with the president of Palatia at the time, Elias Peissner. Consequently, Palatia expelled Peissner and several other members of the corps due to their allegiance to the unpopular woman.

King Ludwig I ordered that the banned students be re-admitted to Palatia, putting further pressure on the strained relationship between students and the king, who had tried to abolish student corporations on several occasions in the past.

Consequently, Karl von Schrenck von Notzing, Bavarian attorney general at the time and alumnus of Palatia, signed a petition against Lola Montez and resigned from his public office along with all other Bavarian ministers.

In an effort to subdue tensions, the king closed the university temporarily in February 1848 and ordered all students to leave the city. This led to riots not only from the students, but also the general population, who were financially dependent on income from the affluent students.

On February 10, 1848, the students and other citizens of Munich gathered before the king's residence and riots broke out throughout the city. In an effort to appease the population, Ludwig I reopened the university the next day and exiled his publicly loathed mistress, who fled to Switzerland on February 11.

The anti-establishment sentiment growing across the German Confederation and much of Europe within the context of the March Revolution continued to intensify in Bavaria. On March 16, 1848, riots escalated again, after Montez returned to the city despite her banishment. Finally, the king resigned under public pressure on March 20, 1848, handing over power of the state to his son, Maximillian II.

== Symbols ==
The corps' motto is Fortuna virtutis comes! or "May fortune be with the courageous".

=== Colors ===
Palatia's colors are high red, king's blue and silver-white. High red represents the city of Regensburg, the capital city of Upper Palatinate, where Palatia's founding members originated. King's blue and silver-white are the colors of Bavaria.

Palatia's members can be recognized at formal events by sashes with the corp's colors of high red, king's blue and silver-white enclosed within silver trim on the borders. On many occasions members also wear traditional hats with the high red color.

New members generally remain a pledge (known as “Fuchs” in German) for a period of around one year, in which they wear sashes with high red and king's blue, but without the third color, silver-white.

=== Coat of arms ===
Palatia's coat of arms can be found on several objects belonging to the Corps, such as stained glass windows of the corps house, beer mugs, pipes or paintings. It contains four quadrants with the motto of the coat of arms in the upper-right corner: „Sit ensis noster vindex!“ (Latin for “Let the sword be our vindicator!”). In the lower-right corner, the Corp's emblem can be found, which contains the letters “c,” “f,” “p” and “v.” Derived from these letters, Palatia's emblem mottos are “circulus fratrum Palatiae vivat” (Latin for “the circle of Pfälzer brothers lives”) or “vivat, crescat, floriat” (Latin for “live, grow, blossom”). In the lower-left corner is the date and place of Palatia's founding.

== Affiliations ==
Membership in Palatia was exclusive (“Lebenscorps”), meaning members couldn't join other corps, until 1969, when simultaneous membership with other corps was officially permitted.

Palatia has two traditional partnerships (“Freundschaftsverhältnis”) with other corps, Saxonia Vienna and Teutonia Graz. The partnerships are loosely regulated by contract (“Freundschaftsvertrag”), but generally include personnel support and simplified conditions for simultaneous membership in both corps of the partnership.

In the 1990s, Palatia also began a probationary partnership ("Vorstellungsverhältnis") with Visigothia Rostock, which became an official partnership in June, 2012.

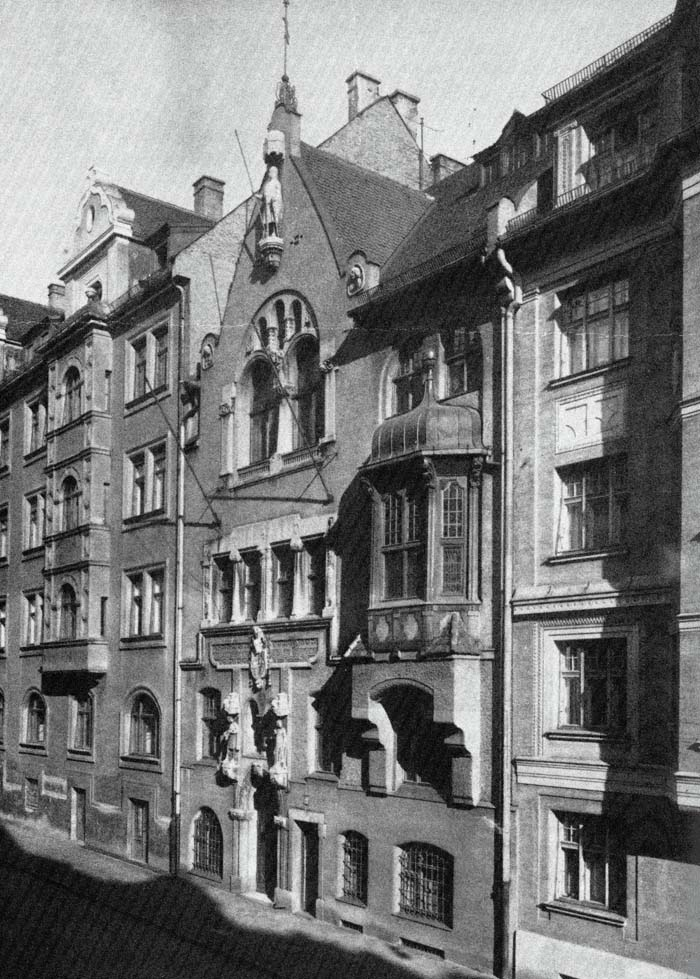
Palatia's first house at Reitmorstraße 28 in Munich

== Corps house ==
Palatia's current corps house is located near LMU Munich and was built in 1952 as a two-story building with representative accommodations, recreational rooms and a fencing facility in the basement. It was expanded to five stories with living quarters for members in 1958 and inaugurated on December 6, 1958.

Palatia's current corps house replaced the original house designed by architect Eugen Drollinger, which was destroyed during World War II.

== Literature ==
In alphabetic order

- Bertrams, Kurt U.: Der Kartell-Convent und seine Verbindungen, Hilden 2009
- Eduard Pohl'sche Buchdruck (Publisher): Bundes-Fest-Lieder zur 70jährigen Stiftungs-Feier des Corps Palatia zu Landshut den 23., 24. und 25. Juni 1883, Amberg 1883
- Gladen, Paulgerhard (Editor):Die Kösener und Weinheimer Corps, Hilden 2007
- Horn, Oscar: Zur fünfzigjährigen Jubelfeier des Corps Palatia: Ein Gedenkbuch, München 1863 (Digitalisat)
- J. F. Rietsch'sche Buchdruck (Publisher): Das siebenzigste Bundesfest des Corps "Palatia" Gefeiert zu Landshut in den Tagen des 23. bis 25. Juni 1883. (Ein Erinnerungsblatt), Landshut 1883
- Keppler's Buchdruckerei (Publisher): Verzeichniss der Philister des Studenten-Corps Palatia von dessen Gründung zu Landshut am 20. Juni 1813 als Lebensverbindung bis zu dessen Umwandlung in ein Waffencorps zu München am 18. Mai 1877.Nebst Berichtungen zu dem Verzeichniss, Passau 1877
- Kuhn, Joachim: Geschichte des Corps Palatia zu München. 1813 bis 1987, Munich 1987
