= Corps Vandalia-Teutonia =

German student fraternal group in Berlin

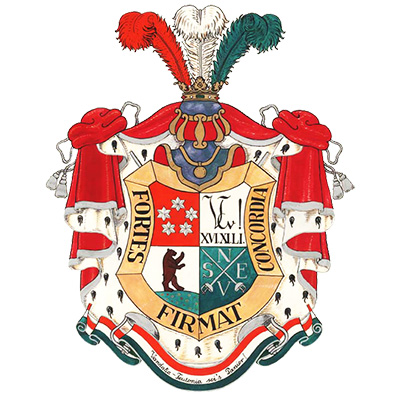
- Founded: November 19, 1851; 174 years ago Berlin, Germany
- Type: Studentenverbindung
- Affiliation: KSCV
- Status: Active
- Scope: Local
- Motto: Fortes firmat concordia
- Pillars: Honor, Loyalty, Comradeship, Patriotism, Tolerance, and Sense of Responsibility
- Colors

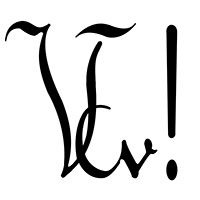
- Zirkel
- Nickname: Vandalen-Teutonen
- Motto of arms: Nulla sine ense virtus
- Pledge colors
- Headquarters: Riemeisterstraße 4 Berlin-Zehlendorf 14169; Germany
- Website: v-t.de

Corps Vandalia-Teutonia Berlin is a German student corps or fraternity. It was established in 1851 and includes members from the universities in Berlin, Germany. The corps practices academic fencing. It is a member of the Kösener SC-Verband (KSCV).

== History ==
Corps Vandalia-Teutonia Berlin is a German student corps or college fraternity that was established in Berlin, Germany on November 19, 1851. Its membership includes students and alumni of all of the universities in Berlin, including the Free University of Berlin, Humboldt University of Berlin, the Technische Universität Berlin, and the University of Potsdam

Corps Vandalia-Teutonia practices academic fencing and wears colours. Like all student corps, Vandalia-Teutonia practices tolerance in political, scientific and religious affairs. Members also have to preserve good social graces and a respectful attitude towards women and senior people.

Corps Vandalia-Teutonia is a member of the Kösener SC-Verband (KSCV), an umbrella organization consisting of the oldest German fraternities.

== Symbols ==
Corps Vandalia-Teutonia Berlin's motto is Fortes firmat concordia. Its motto of arms is Nulla sine ense virtus. The corps' basic principles or pillars are set in the corps constitution. They are honor, loyalty, comradeship, patriotism, tolerance and sense of responsibility.

The fraternity's colors are red, white, and green. Its pledge colors are red, white, and red. Its members are called Vandalen-Teutonen.

== Notable members ==
Following are some of the notable member of Corps Vandalia-Teutonia Berlin.

- Otto Roquette (1824–96), German poet
- Rudolph Stratz (1864–1936), German author
- Werner Dankwort (1895–1986), German U.N. ambassador

== See also ==
- Corps
- Kösener Senioren-Convents-Verband
- Studentenverbindung
