= Karl Ebermaier =

Last governor of German Kamerun

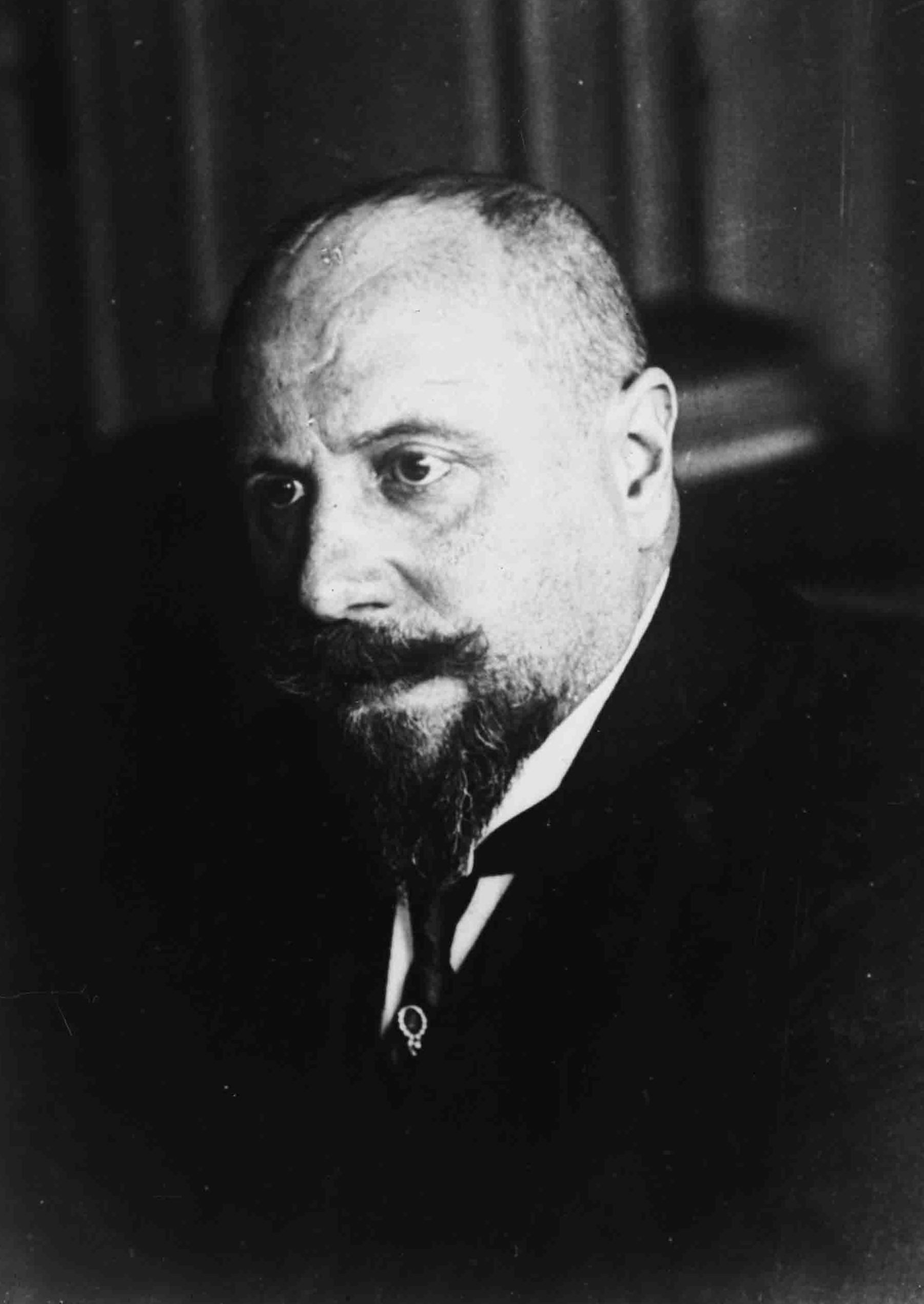
Karl Ebermaier

Karl Ebermaier (Elberfeld, 2 October 1862 – Bernried am Starnberger See, 21 August 1943) was between 1912 and 1916 the last governor of German Kamerun.

== Life ==
He was the son of State Procurator Friedrich Wilhelm Ebermaier. He studied law in Tübingen and was a member of the Corps Rhenania.

He worked in Germany until 1898, when he became Supreme Judge of German East Africa, but was called back to Germany after a duel-scandal. In 1902 he was sent to Kamerun as first Referent and deputy Governor. On 29 March 1912, he replaced Otto Gleim as Governor of Kamerun.

It was in that function that he was confronted with a Franco-British-Belgian invasion after the outbreak of the First World War on 4 August 1914. Formally commander-in-chief of the armed forces, Ebermaier left Major Carl Heinrich Zimmermann direct the military operations. By 1916, the situation was so desperate that Ebermaier, with the majority of the Colonial administration, fled to neutral Spanish Guinea. Ebermaier was interned in Madrid and led there until 1919 the Internment Administration.

== See also ==
- Kamerun campaign
