= Kösener Senioren-Convents-Verband =

European association of student fraternities

- KSCV
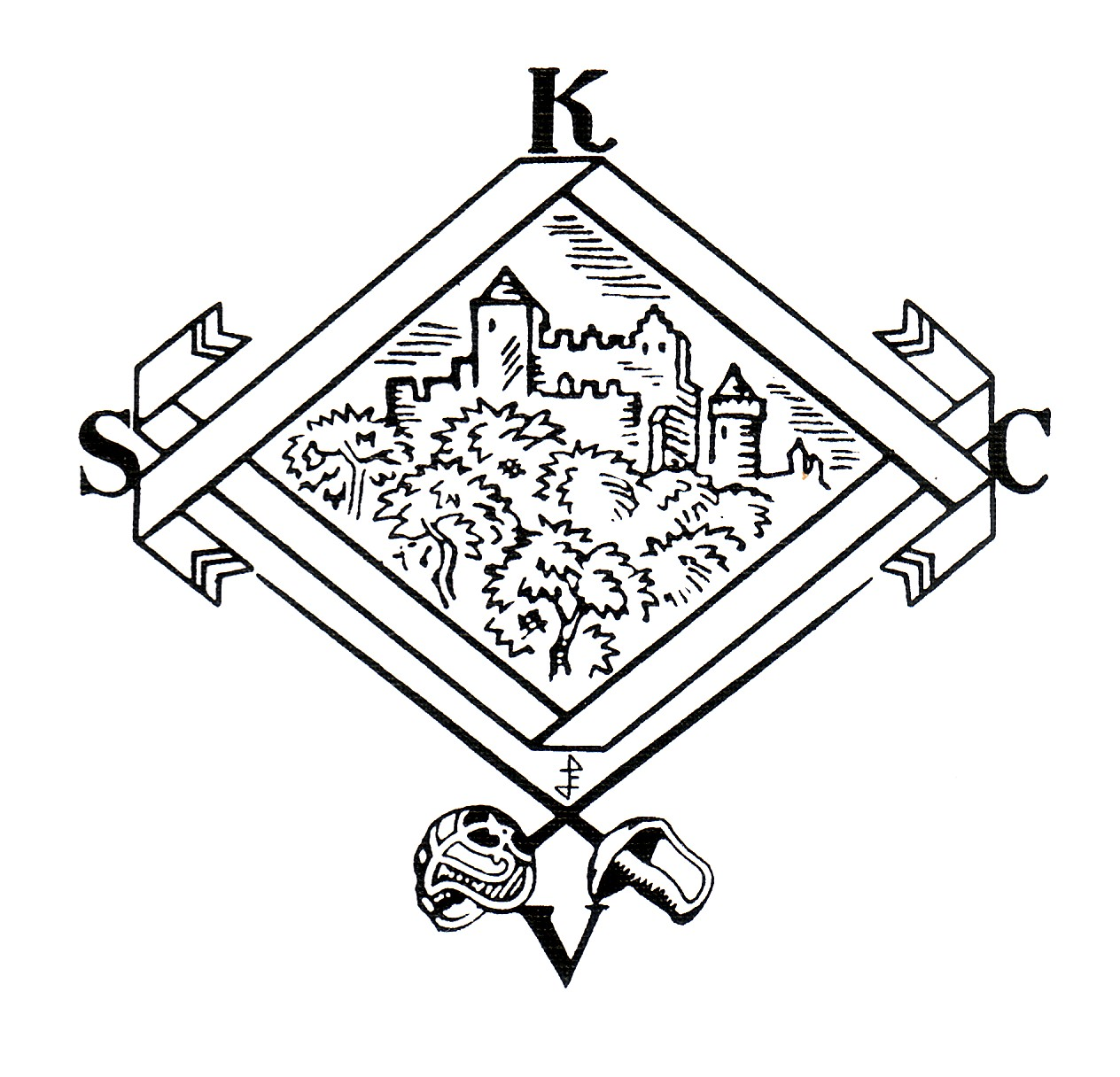
- Founded: 1848; 178 years ago Jena, Thuringia, Germany
- Type: Umbrella
- Affiliation: Independent
- Status: Active
- Emphasis: Studentenverbindungen
- Scope: Europe
- Members: 105 active
- Headquarters: Naumburger Str. 2–4; Bad Kösen 06628; Germany

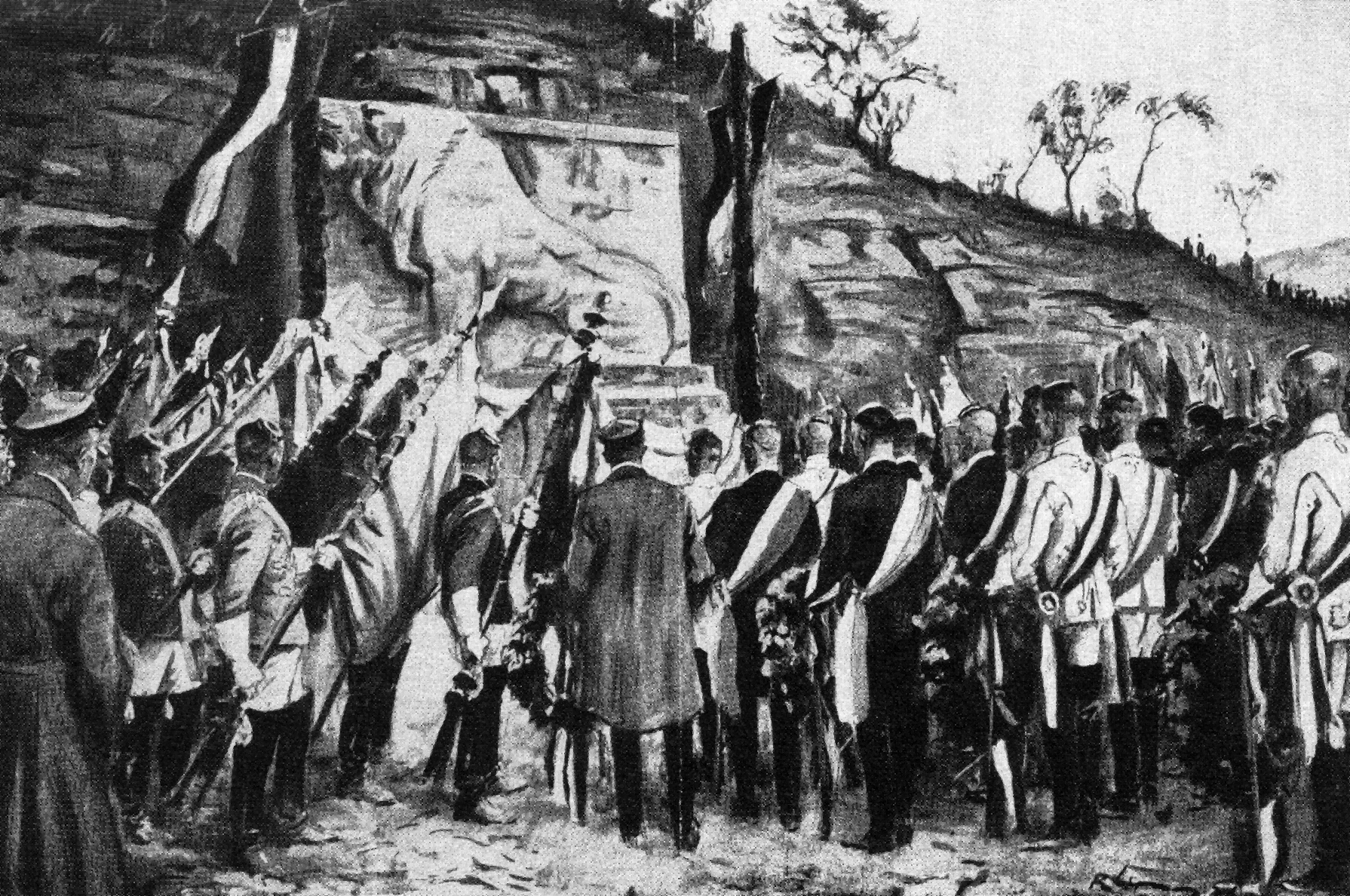
Inauguration of the memorial for the fallen corps students in World War I

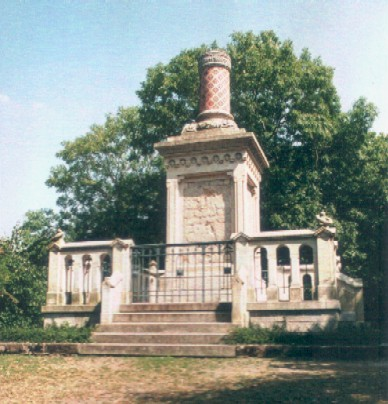
Pillar to the Fallen

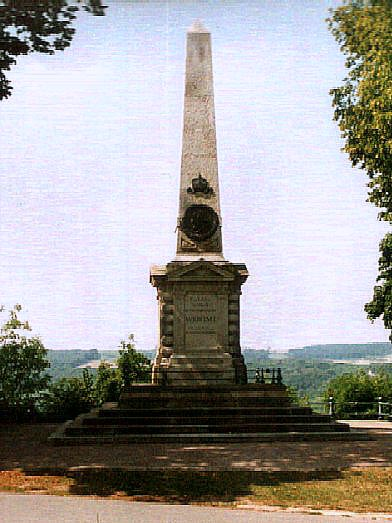
Emperor William I Obelisk

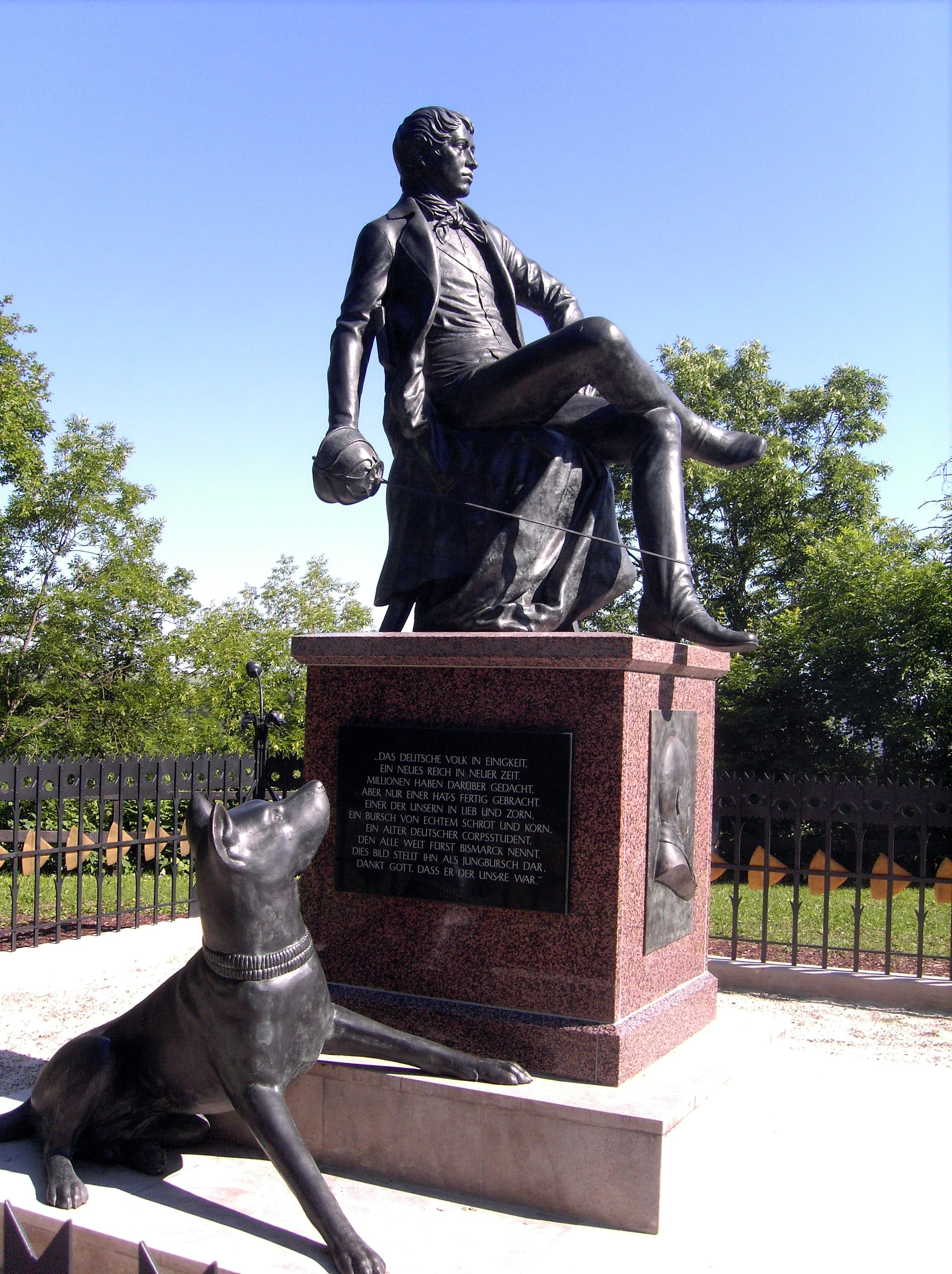
Young Bismarck Monument

The Kösener Senioren-Convents-Verband (abbreviation: KSCV) is the oldest association of German, Austrian and Swiss Studentenverbindungen or students fraternities. It comprises roughly 105 German, Austrian and a Flemish (Belgian), Hungarian and Swiss Corps, all of which are based upon the principle of tolerance.

== History ==
The KSCV was founded in Jena, Thuringia, Germany in 1848. It soon moved to Bad Kösen in the northernmost German wine growing area Saale-Unstrut. Its annual meetings are held Bad Kösen and in the nearby Rudelsburg.

=== Nazi rule ===
During the National Socialist regime of the Third Reich (Ger. Drittes Reich), a majority of member corps of the KSCV (namely Corps Borussia Halle, Corps Vandalia Heidelberg, Corps Rhenania Straßburg, Corps Suevia München, and Corps Suevia Tübingen) refused to exclude Jewish members or to cooperate with the National Socialist youth movements, which were intended to replace the corps and other non-compliant student associations. Inevitably, this policy resulted in the forced closure and disbandment of the corps and, eventually, the KSCV.

The dissolution of the KSCV was further ensured by Hitler after May 1935, in which Corps Saxo-Borussia Heidelberg members had interfered with a broadcast speech by Hitler by singing satirical songs against the Nazis. The Hitler Youth was a rival organization which gained supremacy as the premiere youth organization in Germany under the Third Reich.

=== Reorganization ===
The KSCV, which had an ambivalent relationship with the Nazi government, was reconstituted by 1950 primarily in West Germany, with fraternities from the now-Soviet-occupied East Germany relocating to the West. Upon reunification, the Eastern fraternities returned to their original locations.

== Monuments ==
The Kösener monuments commemorate prestigious members of the Corps as well as the many fallen during the wars.

== Member corps ==
- Corps Athesia Innsbruck
- Corps Austria Frankfurt
- Corps Baruthia Erlangen
- Corps Bavaria Erlangen
- Corps Bavaria Munich
- Corps Bavaria Würzburg
- Corps Borussia Bonn
- Corps Concordia Rigensis
- Corps Flaminea Leuven
- Corps Franconia München
- Corps Frankonia Prag zu Saarbrücken
- Corps Franconia Würzburg
- Corps Guestphalia Berlin
- Corps Guestphalia Halle
- Corps Hannovera Göttingen
- Corps Hansea Köln
- Corps Hubertia Freiburg
- Corps Joannea Graz
- Corps Makaria München
- Corps Marchia Berlin
- Corps Marchia Brünn
- Corps Marcomannia-Breslau zu Köln
- Corps Masovia Königsberg (Potsdam)
- Corps Palatia Munich
- Corps Rhenania Bonn
- Corps Rhenania Heidelberg
- Corps Rhenania Tübingen
- Corps Saxo-Borussia Heidelberg
- Corps Schacht Leoben
- Corps Teutonia-Hercynia Göttingen
- Corps Transrhenania München
- Corps Suevia Freiburg
- Corps Suevia Heidelberg
- Corps Suevia München
- Corps Vandalia-Teutonia, Berlin

== See also ==
- German student corps
- List of German student corps members
