= Westfalen AG =

Westfalen AG & Co. KG
- Type: AG & Co. KG
- Industry: Chemicals, Energy
- Headquarters: Münster, Germany
- Key people: Dr. Thomas Perkmann (CEO), Jesko von Stechow, Dr. Meike Schäffler
- Revenue: €2.25 billion (2023)
- Number of employees: 2,185 (2023)
- Website: www.westfalen.com

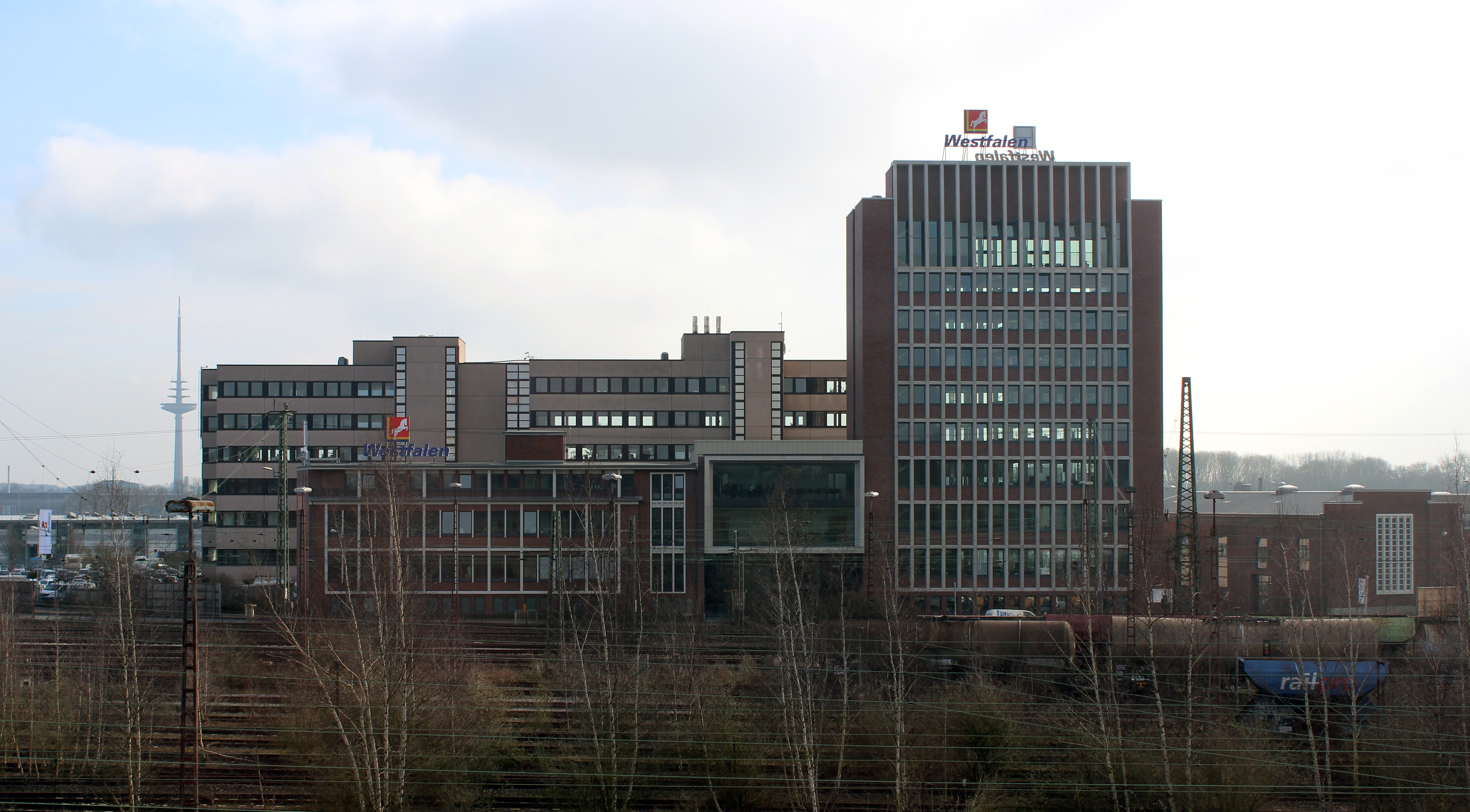
Westfalen corporate headquarters, Industrieweg, Münster

Westfalen AG & Co. KG, headquartered in Münster, Westphalia operates as a retailer in the liquefied petroleum gas (Westfalengas) and fuel sectors and as a manufacturer of industrial gases.

== Company history ==
=== 1923 – 1945 ===
Sauerstoffwerke AG was founded by Wilhelm Albert in Münster on 11 October 1923. Initially the company was in the business of producing oxygen for oxyfuel welding and cutting. The following year they began producing oxygen using their own air separation plant.

In 1925 they started a second division, Westfalen Kraft- und Schmierstoffe, for fuels and lubricants. The first Westfalen service station opened two years later on Albersloher Weg in Münster. During the 1930s they expanded their network of service stations, so that by 1938 there were around 100 Westfalen service stations in existence.

In 1936 they began developing the factory premises on Industrieweg and within two years a new air separation unit, a bulk storage tank and an administration building had all been put into operation. From the outbreak of the Second World War, until the end of the war, the service station division was managed by the Zentralbüro für Mineralöl GmbH, Berlin.

The oxygen system and gasometer were badly damaged during an air raid at the beginning of October 1943. Company founder Wilhelm Albert died on 30 November 1943. His son-in-law Josef Fritsch and his son Herbert Albert took over the running of the company.

=== 1945 – 2000 ===
After the war they began to rebuild the damaged air separation plant. From 1946 the founder's sons ran the company for the next 30 years: Herbert Albert was the commercial director and company chairman, while August-Wilhelm Albert was a board member and the technical director.

The third division, liquefied petroleum gas (Westfalengas), was started in 1954. Liquefied petroleum gas was decanted into gas cylinders at the Münster-Gremmendorf facility. Two years later a new liquid gas filling plant and an acetylene production system were put into operation at this same facility.

The construction of a new tank depot with an oil port on the Dortmund-Ems canal in Münster-Gelmer was completed in 1966. The onset of the 1973/74 oil crisis brought a sharp decline in the mineral oil business.

Herbert Albert died on 20 June 1974 and Wolfgang Fritsch-Albert and August-Wilhelm Albert took over the running of the company. The latter died three years later. Wolfgang Fritsch-Albert then became the company chairman.

In 1988 the word 'Sauerstoffwerk' was deleted from the company registers; the registered company name was now just Westfalen AG. One year later the company took over KDE Kälte Zubehör Handelsgesellschaft, Wannenwetsch GmbH and Ernst Rückwarth GmbH & Co. KG, the biggest acquisition in the company's history. In the same year the first foreign subsidiary was founded in the Netherlands, followed by Poland in 1995 and Belgium and France in 1999.

=== Development since 2000 ===
In 2000 a hydrogen production plant was put into operation in collaboration with another company, SRS Schmierstoffraffinerie Salzbergen GmbH. In 2001 Westfalen AG founded the subsidiary Westfalen Gas Schweiz GmbH based in Eiken, Aargau, Switzerland. 2005 saw the founding of the Austrian subsidiary.

In 2006 Westfalen AG took over the Kuwait Petroleum Deutschland GmbH service stations that operate under the Markant brand.

The sixth foreign subsidiary was founded in 2010 in the Czech Republic. The same year saw the Westfalen Group's biggest foreign investment to date: the air separation plant in Le Creusot, France, started production.

German business newspaper FAZ ranked Westfalen AG as 102nd of the largest German family owned companies for 2010 (2009: 109; 2008: 112).

Biofuel Super E10 was introduced to 260 Westfalen service stations across Germany in August 2011.

In September 2012, as one of the S1000plus projects supported by Westfalen AG, a successful car journey of over 1,365.5 kilometres on LPG took place without refuelling.

The company has been supplying natural gas and electricity across Germany since November 2012.

In May 2014 the eleven-storey office block Westfalen Tower was opened on Industrieweg in Münster.

Click-on fuel gas cylinder Conneo for cylinder exchange in seconds was introduced in August 2014.

In July 2015 the Westfalen Group acquired 80% of Medica Technik GmbH. The company headquartered in Brachbach (Siegerland) is specialized in home care, medical and rehabilitation equipment.

For the beginning of 2016 AVIA and Westfalen signed a fleet card acceptance agreement.

Dr. Meike Schäffler and Torsten Jagdt joined the board of directors in July 2016.

In June 2016 the first high-performance carwash for trucks opened in Kerpen.

Since December 2016, Westfalen AG operates the first hydrogen station in Münster.

At the end of 2016, the company received the "Audit Beruf und Familie" certificate.

In September 2016, the company celebrated the 50th anniversary of the tank depot in Münster-Gelmer. Major parts of the current production site Münster-Gremmendorf will be relocated next to the tank depot in Gelmer by 2019.

In the middle of March 2017, Renate Fritsch-Albert was elected to the Supervisory Board of the Westfalen Group. From the beginning of April 2017 until his passing in October 2017, Alexander Fritsch-Albert was member of the Westfalen Group Executive Board.

In mid-June 2017, Chopstix Noodle Bar opened the first German restaurant at a Westfalen service station in Münster.

After more than 40 years as chief executive officer, Wolfgang Fritsch-Albert switched to the supervisory board on 13 July 2018 and has been elected chairman of this board. As of 1 September 2018, Dr Thomas Perkmann is the new CEO of the Westfalen Group.

A large LPG tank depot of Westfalen Group is being built in Krefeld port area until 2019.

The companies Westfalen Medical GmbH and Westfalen Medical BV, which specialize in providing oxygen to patients, were merged into the new Respiratory Homecare division in 2023.

== Business sectors ==
=== Gases division ===
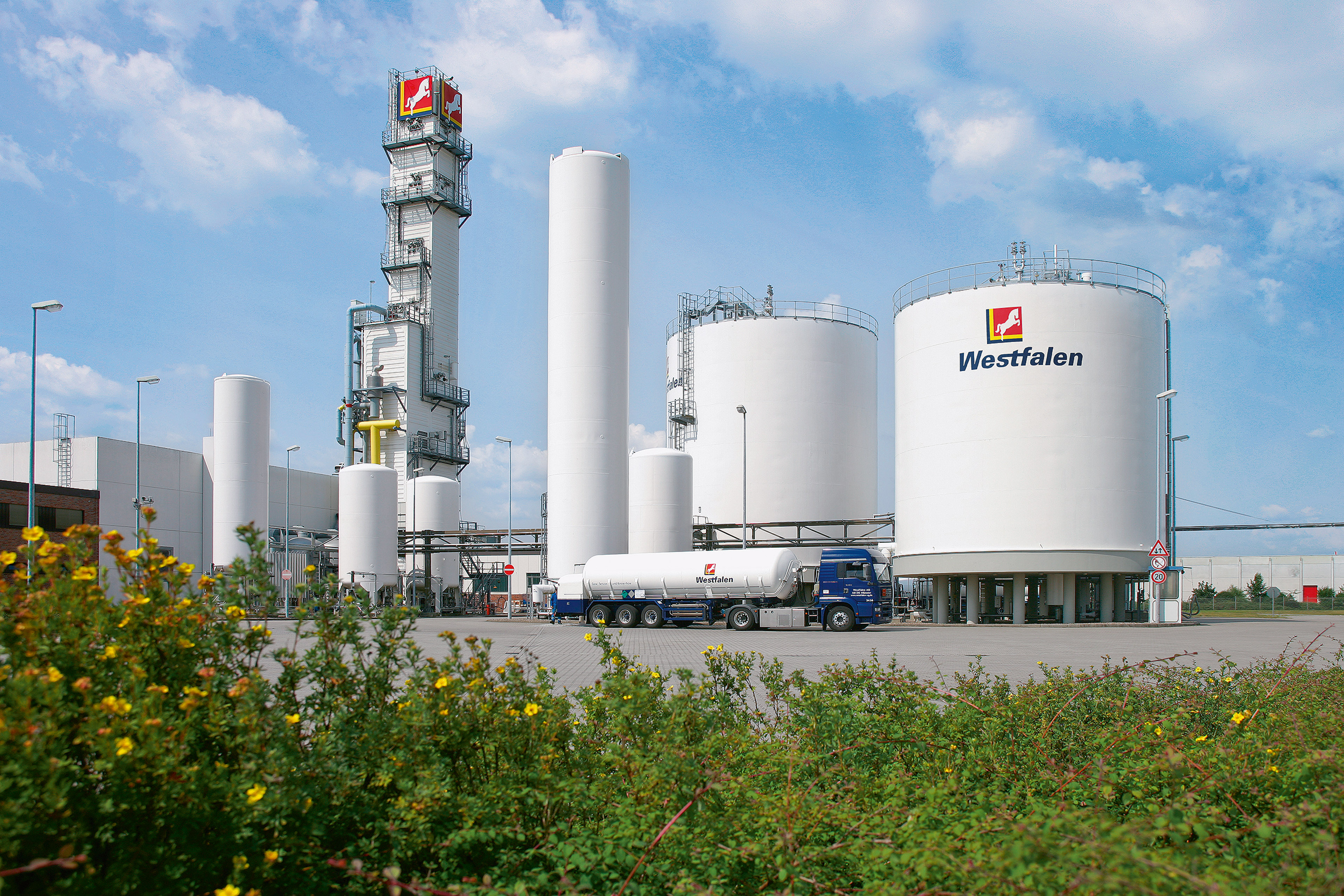
Westfalen facility in Hörstel in the Tecklenburg region

Since it was founded in 1923, Westfalen AG & Co. KG has developed industrial gases from regional through to European-oriented suppliers, with branches, sales offices, warehouses and facilities as well as subsidiaries in France, Benelux, Austria and Switzerland. The product portfolio comprises over 300 standardized gases and gas mixtures – including industrial gases, refrigerants, laboratory gases, food gases, gases for medical and pharmaceutical use, for inhalation, test and measuring gases, laser gas, and welding and weld shielding gases.

A speciality gas centre manufactures analysis gases in line with users' specific recipes. The speciality gas centre has been an accredited test and calibration laboratory since 2006. The range of industrial gases include standard purities of argon, carbon dioxide, oxygen, nitrogen, hydrogen and compressed air. The speciality gases on offer are high-purity grade argon, helium, oxygen, nitrogen, hydrogen, synthetic air, nitrous oxide (laughing gas), methane and propane. Gases for medical and pharmaceutical use and for inhalation include liquid and gaseous oxygen for ventilation and dinitrogen monoxide as an anaesthetic. In the food industry, gases are used for cooling, freezing, hydrogenation, foaming or packaging.

These gases are all produced using air separation at Hörstel in the Tecklenburg region, Westphalia, in Laichingen (near Ulm) and in Le Creusot in France. Hörstel, as well as being Westfalen AG & Co. KG's speciality gas centre, also bottles high purity and speciality gases including helium. Hydrogen is produced in Salzbergen using steam reforming. Acetylene was produced and bottled in Münster-Gremmendorf.

=== Energy supply division ===
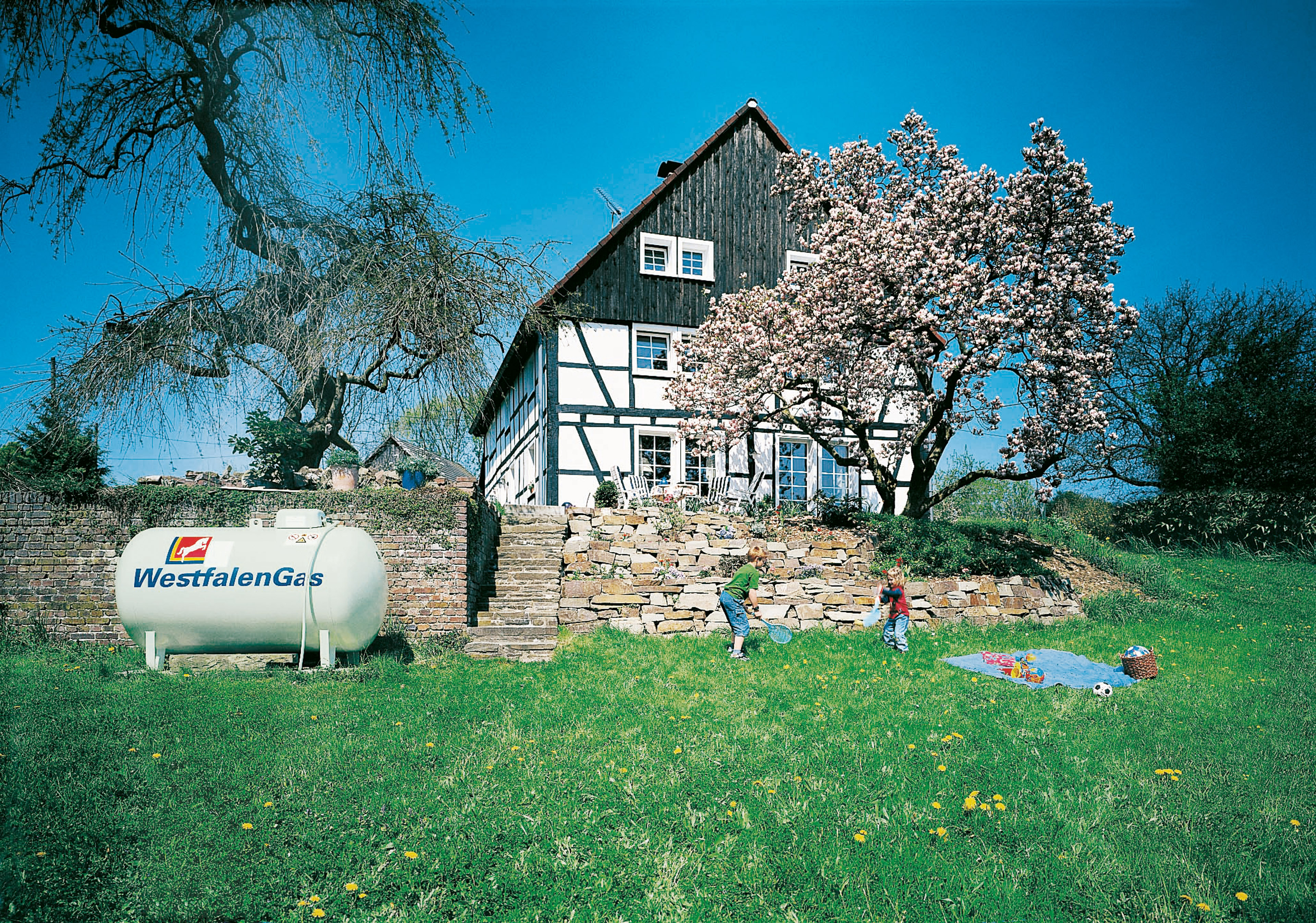
A Westfalengas tank in a garden

The liquefied petroleum gas brand Westfalengas (DIN 51622) has been available on the German market since 1954. It consists of a minimum of 95 percent by volume of propane and propene, and five percent by volume of ethane, butane and butane isomer components. It is made from the production of crude oil and natural gas and as a processed product from refineries.

Westfalengas is used by private households and companies for heat generation; in industry, craft and agriculture is it used as an energy source. Even under low pressure (approx. 8 bar), 260 litres of gaseous gas will make one litre of liquid gas. This means that large quantities can be stored and transported using little space. Residential complexes and housing estates can be equipped with their own supply network.

Westfalengas supplies LPG and propellant for operating engines. As the gas mixture burns with almost no fumes, vehicles such as forklift trucks can even be used inside buildings. Westfalen LPG is available at around 900 public service stations through different brands and companies. This means that the company is the segment leader in Germany. Westfalen LPG is different from heating fuel gas as it has a higher butane content: In summer the mixing ratio is 40 percent propane and 60 percent butane, in winter the ratio is the exact opposite.

The energy supply division supplies solar thermal energy systems and components under the brand Solacept.

The company has been supplying natural gas and electricity across Germany since November 2012.

In mid-2023, the Westfalen Group acquired a majority stake in NGC.Tec GmbH, which installs heat pumps, among other things.

In January 2024, the company expanded its product range to include bio-LPG from renewable sources.

=== Service stations division ===
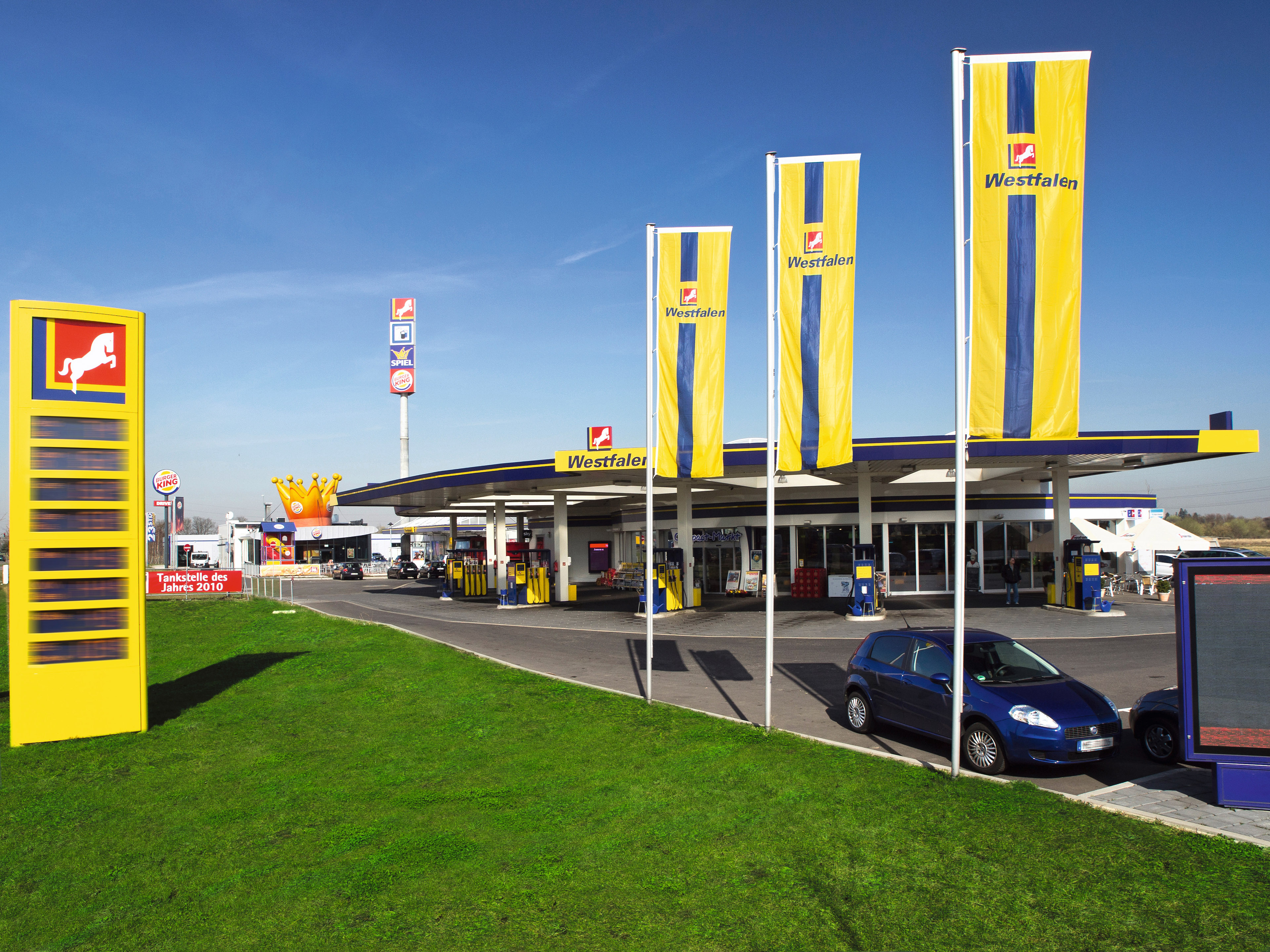
A Westfalen service station in Cologne-Bocklemünd

Westfalen AG & Co. KG operates around 260 brand name service stations in Germany, predominantly in North Rhine-Westphalia and Lower Saxony. As well as fuels and lubricants, the Westfalen service stations offer a wide range of additional products and services such as carwashes and car and tyre services. Many of the service stations also have convenience stores, bistros or other services for travelers.

Westfalen fuels are sourced exclusively from German refineries. In addition to Super plus, Super 95 E5, Super 95 E10 and diesel fuels, the company also offers alternative energy supplies such as LPG, natural gas, E85 Biopower and electric charging points at many service stations. Alternative energy sources play an important role at Westfalen service stations. Own brand and Castrol engine oil for petrol and diesel engines is also available.

Westfalen Service Card is Westfalen AG & Co. KG's fuel card. This card is accepted at over 5,500 service stations including the Westfalen, Agip, Aral, AVIA, Markant, OMV and Total brands.

== Westfalen Group ==
The Westfalen Group is operating with a total of 23 subsidiaries and associates in Germany, Belgium, France, the Netherlands, Austria and Switzerland – with more than 20 production sites located across Europe.

== Company logo ==
The central component of the Westfalen AG & Co. KG word and image logo is a leaping, white horse on a red background. From the founding of the company in 1923 until 2001, the horse in the logo leapt to the left and the whole image had a heraldic look. When the word and image logo was redesigned in 2001 the horse was reduced significantly, the heraldic elements were removed and now the streamlined horse leaps to the right.
