= Joachim Zahn =

German businessman

- Born: January 24, 1914
- Died: October 8, 2002 (aged 88); Munich, Germany
- Occupation: Businessman
- Known for: Chairman of Daimler Benz AG between 1971 and 1979.

Professor Joachim Zahn (born Wuppertal 24 January 1914, died Munich 8 October 2002) was the chairman of Daimler Benz AG between 1971 and 1979.

Zahn was the youngest of four sons of a Wuppertal Lawyer. He himself studied law at Tübingen and later obtained a doctorate at Cologne based on a study on the limits of credit insurance. During the Second World War he served as an army officer in Russia and Italy. His career in commerce and industry began in 1947, and in 1958 he joined Daimler Benz as Financial Director. In 1965 he was appointed speaker of the management board, and became chairman of the main board in 1971. His time at the top was noteworthy, among other things, for the building of Europe's largest truck factory, at Wörth (between Karlsruhe and the frontier with France at Wissembourg). Although he took over the company's chairmanship shortly before the economic crisis triggered by the 1973 oil shortages, the second part of his chairmanship coincided with a continuing period of profitable growth for the company which was able to accumulate substantial financial reserves: these would play an important part in the company's progress under subsequent leaders. Zahn himself remained actively involved with the business until his death, during his final years as an advisor to Jürgen Schrempp.

Zahn's period at the helm was one of growth for Daimler-Benz. Between 1967 and 1976 passenger car output more than doubled, with an average annual growth rate of 6.9% during a decade when the overall growth rate of the German auto-industry was 2.3%. The company's growth in the bus and truck sector outran that of the industry as a whole by an even greater margin.

In 1973 he was awarded an honorary professorship by the regional government of Baden-Württemberg, giving rise to the misguided impression in English speaking countries that Germany's leading manufacturer of trucks and luxury cars was being led by an academic. He is better thought of as an expert in finance and taxation with a formidable and clear intellect, and a capacity to inspire affection and respect in colleagues.

Remarkably, all four of the Zahn brothers from Wuppertal became captains of industry. This prompted banker Hermann Josef Abs to quip that there were so many teeth in the German economy that it was reasonable to speak of a complete bite. ('Zahn' is the German word for 'tooth'.)
