= Corps Franconia München =

German student association

- Founded: January 29, 1836; 190 years ago LMU Munich
- Type: German Student Corps
- Affiliation: KSCT; Münchner Senioren Convent
- Status: Active
- Emphasis: Academic fencing
- Scope: Local
- Motto: Gladius ultor noster
- Colors: Fir Green, White, and Crimson with Silver Trim
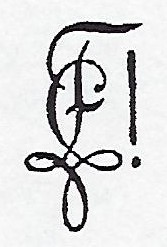
- Zirkel
- Chapters: 1
- Headquarters: Friedrich-Herschel-Str. 27; Munich 81679; Germany
- Website: www.franconia-muenchen.de

The Corps Franconia München is a German student corps. It was established at LMU Munich in Munich, Bavaria, Germany, in 1836. The fraternity is a member of Kösener Senioren-Convents-Verband (KSCT). It practices academic fencing.

== History ==
The Corps Franconia München is a German student corps or fraternity that was established on 29 January 1836 at LMU Munich in Munich, Bavaria, Germany. The fraternity participates in academic fencing and was the first armed corps at the university.

As a member of the Münchner Senioren Convent (SC), the Corps Franconia München is also a member of the Kösener Senioren-Convents-Verband (KSCV), the oldest fraternity association in Germany, Austria, and Switzerland.

Like other student organizations in Germany, Corps Franconia München ceased its operations in 1936 under the Nazi regime. However, from the summer of 1938 to the summer of 1939, members of the corps continued to meet sub rosa. After World War II, the fraternity resumed dueling in 1944.

Corpsburschen-Convent (CC) was reconstituted on April 21, 1950. It now includes students from all of Munich's universities. The Corps Franconia München has a house at Friedrich-Herschel-Str. 27 in Munich.

== Symbols ==
The motto of Corps Franconia München is Gladius ultor noster. Rendered in English, this is "Our Sword Avenges us".

The fraternity's colors are fir green, white, and crimson with silver trim. Members wear a fir green cap and the fraternity's colors. Pledges wear a ribbon that is fir green and white. Honorary members wear a white embroidered ribbon.
