= List of Members of the Prussian State Council of Nazi Germany =

Members of Prussian advisory body 1933–1945

Prussian State Council (Nazi Germany) Preußischer Staatsrat
- Civil flag of Prussia

Type
- Type: Advisory body

History
- Established: 8 July 1933
- Disbanded: 8 May 1945
- Preceded by: Prussian State Council (Weimar Republic)
- Succeeded by: Formally abolished, 25 February 1947

Leadership
- Präsident: Hermann Göring

Meeting place
- New Palace, Potsdam

The List of Members of the Prussian State Council of Nazi Germany enumerates the persons who served on the advisory body to the Prussian minister president, which existed from July 1933 to May 1945. The State Council by law consisted of (1) members by virtue of office (ex officio members) and (2) members who were appointed by the Prussian minister president. The ex officio members were the minister president and the Prussian cabinet ministers. Of the fifty appointed members, some were to be drawn specifically from the state secretaries of the ministries and certain other Nazi Party or government office holders, among whom were the Stabschef of the SA, the Reichsführer-SS, certain other high ranking SA and SS officers and the Gauleiter of the Prussian Gaue. The remaining appointed members were to include representatives of churches, business, labor, science, art and other "men of merit". Of the 125 known members of the State Council, some 31 died in office, 18 were dismissed, 12 resigned or retired and 64 remained in office at the fall of the Nazi regime.

== List of ex officio members ==
Name	Term in office	Qualifying office when appointed	Comments (Note: Date of departure if no longer a member at the end of the Nazi regime. Yellow background if died in office; blue if dismissed from office; pink if resigned or retired from office.)
Hermann Göring	1933–1945	Prussian Minister president	Dismissed from all offices in April 1945.
Walter Darré	1933–1945	Prussian Minister of Agriculture, Land and Forests	
Julius Dorpmüller	1937–1945	Prussian Minister of Transport	
Wilhelm Frick	1934–1945	Prussian Minister of the Interior	
Walther Funk	1938–1945	Prussian Minister of Economics	
Franz Gürtner	1934–1935	Prussian Minister of Justice	Resigned when Prussian Ministry merged with Reich Justice Ministry in April 1935.
Hanns Kerrl	1933–1941	Prussian Minister of Justice	Resigned as Minister in July 1934, but remained an appointed member and died in office in December 1941.
Johannes Popitz	1933–1944	Prussian Minister of Finance	Dismissed and arrested in connection with the 20 July plot in July 1944.
Bernhard Rust	1933–1945	Prussian Minister of Science, Education and Popular Culture	Died in office (suicide) in May 1945.
Kurt Schmitt	1933–1945	Prussian Minister of Economics and Labor	Resigned as Minister in January 1935, but remained an appointed member until 1945.
Franz Seldte	1935–1945	Prussian Minister of Labor	

== List of appointed members ==
Name	Term in office	Office or rank when appointed	Comments (Note: Date of departure if no longer a member at the end of the Nazi regime. Yellow background if died in office; blue if dismissed from office; pink if resigned or retired from office.)
Friedrich Alpers	1937–1944	State Secretary, Reich and Prussian State Forestry Office	Died in office (suicide) in September 1944.
August Wilhelm of Prussia	1933–1945	SA-Gruppenführer	
Herbert Backe	1935–1945	State Secretary, Prussian Ministry of Food and Agriculture	
Wilhelm Berning	1933–1945	Bishop of Osnabrück	
Wilhelm Börger	1933–1945	Trustee of Labour for the Rhine Province	
Ernst Brandes	1933–1935	Estate owner in East Prussia	Died in office in April 1935.
Rudolf Brinkmann	1938–1939	State Secretary, Prussian Ministry of Economics	Resigned and hospitalized for mental illness in May 1939.
Helmuth Brückner	1933–1934	Gauleiter of Silesia	Dismissed from all offices in connection with the Röhm purge in December 1934.
Bruno Claußen	1933–1934	State Secretary, Prussian Ministry of Economics and Labor	Retired in May 1934.
Leonardo Conti	1934–1945	Health Commissioner, Prussian Interior Ministry	
Kurt Daluege	1933–1945	SS-Gruppenführer	
Georg von Detten	1933–1934	SA-Gruppenführer	Died in office (murdered in the Röhm purge) in July 1934.
Sepp Dietrich	1933–1945	SS-Gruppenführer	
Hermann Dohna-Finckenstein	1933–1942	Estate owner in West Prussia	Died in office in December 1942.
Otto-Heinrich Drechsler	1937–1945	Oberbürgermeister of Lübeck	Died in office (suicide) in May 1945.
Joachim Albrecht Eggeling	1937–1945	Gauleiter of Halle-Merseburg	Died in office (suicide) in April 1945.
Karl Ernst	1933–1934	SA-Gruppenführer	Died in office (murdered in the Röhm purge) in June 1934.
Friedrich Karl Florian	1933–1945	Gauleiter of Düsseldorf	
Albert Forster	1933–1945	Gauleiter of Danzig	
Roland Freisler	1933–1945	State Secretary, Prussian Justice Ministry	Died in office (in an air raid) in February 1945.
Axel von Freytagh-Loringhoven	1933–1942	Professor of Law, University of Breslau	Died in office in October 1942.
Wilhelm Furtwängler	1933–1945	Principal Conductor, Berlin Philharmonic	
Paul Giesler	1941–1943	Gauleiter of Southern Westphalia	Resigned in June 1943.
Artur Görlitzer	1933–1945	Deputy Gauleiter of Berlin	Died in office (suicide) in April 1945.
Rüdiger Graf von der Goltz	1933–1945	Trustee of Labour, Province of Pomerania	
Ludwig Grauert	1933–1945	State Secretary, Prussian Interior Ministry	
Arthur Greiser	1939–1945	Gauleiter of Posen	
Erich Gritzbach	1938–1945	Chief of the Staff Office, Prussian State Ministry	
Josef Grohé	1933–1945	Gauleiter of Cologne-Aachen	
Gustaf Gründgens	1936–1945	Generalintendant, Prussian State Theater	
Carl von Halfern	1933–1937	Oberpräsident, province of Pomerania	Died in office in October 1937.
Edmund Heines	1933–1934	SA-Obergruppenführer	Died in office (murdered in the Röhm purge) in June 1934.
Kurt Herrmann	1938–1945	Publisher and industrialist	
Reinhard Heydrich	1934–1942	Chief of the Sicherheitsdienst (SD)	Died in office (assassinated) in June 1942.
Heinrich Himmler	1933–1945	Reichsführer-SS	Dismissed from all offices in April 1945.
Hans Hinkel	1939–1945	Department Head, Reich Ministry of Propaganda	
Albert Hoffmann	1943–1945	Gauleiter of Southern Westphalia	
Dietrich von Jagow	1934–1945	SA-Obergruppenführer	Died in office (suicide) in April 1945.
Karl Jarres	1933–1945	Industrialist and business executive	
Hanns Johst	1934–1945	First Chairman, German Academy for Poetry	
Rudolf Jordan	1933–1945	Gauleiter of Halle-Merseburg	
Wilhelm Karpenstein	1933–1934	Gauleiter of Pomerania	Dismissed from all offices in connection with the Röhm purge in July 1934.
Walter von Keudell	1935–1937	Generalforstmeister	Dismissed in November 1937.
Wilhelm Kleinmann	1937–1942	State Secretary, Prussian Transportation Ministry	Dismissed in May 1942.
Erich Koch	1933–1945	Gauleiter of East Prussia	
Gustav Koenigs	1935–1940	State Secretary, Prussian Transportation Ministry	Resigned in February 1940.
Walter Köhler	1937–1945	Department Head, Four Year Plan	
Paul Körner	1933–1945	State Secretary, Prussian State Ministry	
Friedrich Krebs	1933–1945	Oberbürgermeister of Frankfurt	
Johannes Krohn	1935–1945	State Secretary, Prussian Labor Ministry	
Friedrich-Wilhelm Krüger	1933–1945	SAü-Obergruppenführer	
Wilhelm Kube	1933–1936	Gauleiter of Kurmark	Dismissed from all offices in August 1936.
Wilhelm Kutscher	1933–1945	Retired Oberpräsident, Province of East Prussia	
Friedrich Landfried	1933–1943	State Secretary, Prussian Finance Ministry	Retired in November 1943.
Hartmann Lauterbacher	1941–1945	Gauleiter of Southern Hanover-Brunswick	
Magnus von Levetzow	1935–1939	Retired Konteradmiral	Died in office in March 1939.
Robert Ley	1933–1945	Chief of Staff, Nazi Party Political Organization	
Julius Lippert	1937–1940	Oberbürgermeister and Stadtspräsident of Berlin	Dismissed in July 1940.
Karl Litzmann	1933–1936	Retired General der Infanterie	Died in office in May 1936.
Karl-Siegmund Litzmann	1933–1945	SA-Obergruppenführer	
Hinrich Lohse	1933–1945	Gauleiter of Schleswig-Holstein	
Ferdinand von Lüninck	1933–1944	Oberpräsident, Province of Westphalia	Dismissed and arrested in connection with the 20 July plot in July 1944.
Hermann von Lüninck	1933–1937	Oberpräsident, Rhine Province	Dismissed in June 1937.
Viktor Lutze	1933–1943	SA-Obergruppenführer	Died in office (in an automobile accident) in May 1943.
Max Luyken	1933–1935	SA-Gruppenführer	Resigned in September 1935.
August von Mackensen	1933–1945	Retired Generalfeldmarschall	
Wilhelm Meinberg	1933–1945	President, Agricultural League	
Kurt Melcher	1933–1945	Oberpräsident, Province of Saxony	
Elhard von Morozowicz	1933–1934	SA-Gruppenführer	Died in office (in an automobile accident) in January 1934.
Hermann Muhs	1937–1945	State Secretary, Prussian Ministry for Church Affairs	
Ludwig Müller	1933–1945	Reichsbischof	
Erich Neumann	1933–1942	Ministerial Director, Prussian State Ministry	Resigned in August 1942.
Werner Peiner	1940–1945	Professor, Hermann Göring Master School for Painting	
Hans Pfundtner	1934–1943	State Secretary, Prussian Interior Ministry	Retired in August 1943.
Philipp, Landgrave of Hesse	1933–1943	Oberpräsident, Province of Hesse-Nassau	Dismissed and arrested for complicity in Mussolini's overthrow in September 1943.
Paul Pleiger	1943–1945	Board Chairman, Reichswerke Hermann Göring	
Hans Ernst Posse	1935–1945	State Secretary, Prussian Ministry of Economics	
Friedrich Reinhart	1933–1943	President, Berlin Chamber of Industry and Trade	Died in office in October 1943.
Ernst Röhm	1933–1934	SA-Stabschef	Died in office (murdered in the Röhm purge) in July 1934.
Heinrich Sahm	1935	Oberbürgermeister of Berlin	Resigned in December 1935.
Ferdinand Sauerbruch	1935–1945	Professor of Medicine, Charité Berlin University of Medicine	
Hjalmar Schacht	1937–1943	President, Reichsbank	Dismissed from all offices in January 1943.
Anton Schifferer	1933–1943	Estate owner in Schleswig-Holstein	Died in office in July 1943.
Rudolf Schmeer	1935–1945	Deputy Leader, German Labor Front	
Carl Schmitt	1933–1945	Professor of Law, Cologne University	
Walter Schuhmann	1933–1945	Reich Chairman, National Socialist Factory Cell Organization	
Franz Schwede	1934–1945	Gauleiter of Pomerania	
Siegfried Seidel-Dittmarsch	1933–1934	SS-Gruppenführer	Died in office in February 1934.
Gustav Simon	1933–1945	Gauleiter of Koblenz-Trier	
Alois Spaniol	1933–1935	Landesführer, Saargebiet	Dismissed in March 1935.
Albert Speer	1938–1945	General Building Inspector for the Reich Capital	
Albert Stange	1933–1935	State Economic Commissioner, Regierungsbezirk Erfurt	Dismissed in October 1935.
Peter Stangier	1933–1945	Deputy Gauleiter of Northern Westphalia	
Emil Georg von Stauss	1933–1942	General Director, Deutsche Bank	Died in office in December 1942.
Wilhelm Stuckart	1933–1934; 1938–1945	State Secretary, Prussian Ministry of Science, Education and Popular Culture; State Secretary, Prussian Interior Ministry	
Emil Stürtz	1936–1945	Gauleiter of Kurmark	
Friedrich Syrup	1939–1942	State Secretary, Prussian Labor Ministry	Dismissed in March 1942
Otto Telschow	1933–1945	Gauleiter of Eastern Hanover	
Josef Terboven	1933–1945	Gauleiter of Essen	Died in office (suicide) in May 1945.
Fritz Thyssen	1933–1938	Board Chairman, United Steelworks	Resigned in November 1938.
Heinz Tietjen	1935–1945	Generalintendant, Prussian State Theater	
Adolf von Trotha	1933–1940	Retired Vizeadmiral	Died in office in October 1940.
Hans von Tschammer und Osten	1936–1943	Reich Sports Leader	Died in office in March 1943.
Harald Turner	1938–1945	Ministerial Director, Prussian Finance Ministry	
Curt von Ulrich	1933–1944	SA-Obergruppenführer	Retired in July 1944.
Gustav Wagemann	1933	Ministerial Councilor, Prussian Justice Ministry.	Died in office (in an airplane accident) in December 1933.
Josef Wagner	1933–1941	Gauleiter of Southern Westphalia	Dismissed from all offices in November 1941.
Karl Weinrich	1933–1943	Gauleiter of Kurhessen	Dismissed from all offices in November 1943.
Fritz Weitzel	1933–1940	SS-Gruppenführer	Died in office (in an air raid) in June 1940.
Theodor Wiegand	1933–1936	President, German Archaeological Institute	Died in office in December 1936.
Werner Willikens	1933–1945	State Secretary, Prussian Ministry of Agriculture, Land and Forests	
Helmuth Wohlthat	1938–1945	Ministerial Director, Prussian Economics Ministry	
Udo von Woyrsch	1933–1945	SS-Gruppenführer	
Werner Zschintzsch	1936–1945	State Secretary, Prussian Ministry of Science, Education and Popular Culture	
