= Hans Ernst Posse =

German lawyer and civil servant (1886–1965)

State Secretary Reich Ministry of Economics (From 21 March 1935, the Reich and Prussian Ministry of Economics)
- In office 3 July 1933 – 8 May 1945
- Preceded by: Paul Bang
- Succeeded by: Position abolished

Deputy to the General Plenipotentiary for the Economy
- In office 4 February 1938 – 8 May 1945
- Preceded by: Position created
- Succeeded by: Position abolished

Personal details
- Born: 31 August 1886 Berlin, Kingdom of Prussia, German Empire
- Died: 18 August 1965 (aged 79) Nußdorf, Baden-Württemberg, West Germany
- Education: University of Bonn; Humboldt University of Berlin
- Profession: Lawyer

Military service
- Allegiance: German Empire
- Branch/service: Imperial German Army
- Years of service: 1914–1918
- Battles/wars: World War I

Hans Ernst Posse (31 August 1886 – 18 August 1965) was a German lawyer and civil servant. He served in the Ministry of Economics of the Weimar Republic and advanced to become a State Secretary there during Nazi Germany.

== Early life ==
Posse's father was the harpist, chamber virtuoso and professor at the Hochschule für Musik in Berlin, Wilhelm Posse (1852–1925). Born in Berlin, Posse attended the humanistic Gymnasium in Charlottenburg. He then studied law at the University of Bonn and Humboldt University of Berlin. After obtaining his doctorate and passing his Referendar examination, he worked for the Cologne government district from 1909 to 1913 as an apprentice lawyer. In 1913, he passed his Assessor examination and became a government lawyer at the district courthouse in Beuthen (today, Bytom). He volunteered for military service in the First World War from 1914 to 1918 and served as an officer in the reserves.

== Career in the Weimar Republic ==
After the end of the war in 1918, he obtained an entry-level position in the Prussian Ministry of Trade and Industry, becoming a Staatskommissar (State Commissioner) in July 1920 and being promoted to Ministerialrat (Ministerial Counselor) in 1921. Also, between 1921 and 1924, he served as a Deputy Plenipotentiary for Prussia to the Reichsrat. In 1924 he transferred to the Reich Economics Ministry, where he was promoted to Ministerialdirektor and appointed department head for customs and trade policy. In this capacity, he took part in numerous international economic negotiations and conferences. In 1927, he headed the delegation for commercial contract negotiations with France. In December 1928, he was head of the German delegation at the German-Russian economic negotiations. He also served as the German representative to the Economic Commission of the League of Nations Assembly, becoming a member of its Economic Committee in November 1932.

== Career in Nazi Germany ==
Following the Nazi seizure of power, Posse was appointed State Secretary in the Ministry of Economics under Reichsminister Kurt Schmitt on 3 July 1933. Also that summer, he served as the customs and trade policy expert for the German delegation at the London Economic Conference. On 8 May 1934, on the retirement of Bruno Claußen, Posse additionally was charged with management of the affairs of the State Secretary in the Prussian Ministry of Economics and Labor. On 21 March 1935, Posse became State Secretary for the now combined Reich and Prussian Ministry of Economics. At that time he also was appointed to the Prussian State Council by Prussian Minister President Hermann Göring. Posse also became a member of the Nazi Party.

On 27 November 1937, one month after Hjalmar Schacht's resigned as Economics Minister, State Secretary Hans Ernst Posse of the Economic Ministry signed an order to expel Jews from the German economy. On 4 February 1938, the new Reichsminister, Walther Funk, brought in Rudolf Brinkmann as principal State Secretary and Posse was given the functions of State Secretary for Special Tasks and Deputy to the General Plenipotentiary for the Economy, a post also held by Funk in addition to the presidency of the Reichsbank.

After the outbreak of the Second World War, Posse in early 1940 also became head of Special Staff I (Economy) in the High Command of the Army and, in 1941, he was appointed Reichskommissar for liaison with the Unilever group, located at Rotterdam in the occupied Netherlands. Apart from his ministerial functions, Posse also sat on the supervisory boards of many German business and finance concerns, including VEBA (chairman), Deutsche Golddiskontbank, Deutsche Werke Kiel AG and Vereinigte Aluminium-Werke.

== Postwar life ==
After the end of the war in Europe, Posse was held by the American military in Neumünster and interrogated on 12 April 1946 in preparation for the Nuremberg trials where Funk, his former superior, was to face charges. According to Funk's rebuttal testimony at Nuremberg, Posse, then age 60 years old, was technically his chief deputy as General Plenipotentiary for the Economy, but had no real responsibilities, in contrast to Friedrich Landfried (who had succeeded Brinkmann) at the Ministry and Emil Puhl at the Reichsbank: "Mr. Posse was an old, sick man whom I had assigned to this post … which, to all intents and purposes, existed only on paper." Nothing is known of Posse's denazification process.

He later lived in Nußdorf (today, part of Überlingen) and worked as a journalist. He died on 18 August 1965 in nearby Singen.
