= DBH =

DBH may refer to:

- `DBH [vocalized as "`Azaba" or "`Adhebah"] (fl. 230-240), 3rd-century king of Axum on the territory of modern-day Ethiopia
- Department of Building and Housing (New Zealand), a government agency within the New Zealand government
- Diani Beach Hospital, a hospital in Mombasa, Kenya
- Diameter at breast height, standard method, in forestry terminology, of expressing the diameter of the trunk of a tree
- Deutsche Bergwerks- und Hüttenbau, German company specializing in construction of mines and quarries
- Dopamine β-hydroxylase, enzyme that converts dopamine to norepinephrine
- Delta Brac Housing Finance Corporation, a private sector real estate financing company in Bangladesh
- Dragon Ball Heroes, a trading card arcade game
- Detroit: Become Human, a video game developed by Quantic Dream for the PlayStation 4
- David Bentley Hart (born 1965), an American philosopher and theologian
