= Bruno Claußen =

German lawyer, civil servant and business executive (1884–unknown)

State Secretary Prussian Ministry of Economics and Labor
- In office 22 February 1933 – 8 May 1934
- Succeeded by: Hans Ernst Posse

Personal details
- Born: 15 February 1884 Itzehoe, Province of Schleswig-Holstein, Kingdom of Prussia, German Empire
- Died: Missing since May 1945
- Education: Doctor of Law
- Alma mater: University of Grenoble; Eberhard Karls University of Tübingen; Humboldt University of Berlin; University of Kiel
- Profession: Lawyer; Business executive

Military service
- Allegiance: German Empire
- Branch/service: Imperial German Army
- Years of service: 1914–1916
- Rank: Oberleutnant
- Unit: Light infantry battalion
- Battles/wars: World War I
- Awards: Wound Badge

Bruno Wilhelm Heinrich Claußen (15 February 1884 – missing since May 1945) was a German lawyer and civil servant who was the state secretary in the Prussian Ministry of Economics and Labor during the first year of Nazi Germany. After leaving public service, he became a successful business executive, serving as a member and as chairman of the supervisory boards of several large banking, commercial and industrial firms. He went missing during the final days of the Second World War.

== Early life ==
Claußen was born in Itzehoe and attended the Gymnasium in Meldorf and in Ratzeburg. He obtained his Abitur in 1902 and studied law and economics at the University of Grenoble, the Eberhard Karls University of Tübingen, the Humboldt University of Berlin and the University of Kiel. He was a member of the Corps Franconia while at Tübingen. In 1906, he received his doctorate in law. He entered the Prussian judicial service as a legal clerk in Schleswig-Holstein, and served as a government Assessor at the courthouse in Kempen between 1911 and 1914. He entered the Imperial German Army and fought in the First World War in a light infantry battalion from 1914 to 1916 when he was discharged due to severe war wounds with the rank of Oberleutnant of reserves. From 1916 to April 1919, he was a representative of the War Food Office in Budapest. This was followed by a similar posting in the occupied Rhineland. On 11 March 1920, he was made a Ministerialrat (ministerial councilor) in the Reich Commissariat for the Occupied Rhineland Area. In 1926, he transferred to the Reich Ministry of Economics.

== Career in the Nazi government ==
On 22 February 1933, less than a month after the Nazi seizure of power, Claußen was appointed secretary of state in the Prussian Ministry of Economics and Labour under minister Alfred Hugenberg, the leader of the German National People's Party, which had joined in a coalition government with the Nazis. On 31 July 1933, Claußen was named a member of the recently reconstituted Prussian State Council by Prussian Minister president Hermann Göring. At the same time, he was appointed Prussian deputy plenipotentiary to the Reichsrat, serving there until its abolition on 14 February 1934. During the Nazi consolidation of power, Claußen's patron Hugenberg was dismissed at the end of June 1933. On 8 May 1934, Claußen was placed into temporary retirement status and his duties as state secretary were assumed by Hans Ernst Posse.

== Business career ==
Claußen held no further government posts and entered the business world, becoming chairman of the supervisory boards of the Zündwaren monopoly safety match company in Berlin, the Dyckerhoff portland cement works in Mainz and the G. Kärger Machine Tool Factory in Berlin (since 1949, part of BWF Marzahn). He also sat as a member of the supervisory boards of Commerz- und Privat-Bank in Berlin, the Dresdner Bank in Berlin, the Allgemeine Deutsche Credit-Anstalt bank in Leipzig and the Westdeutschen Kaufhof AG department store in Cologne.

Claußen went missing during the Battle of Berlin and his fate has never been determined.

== Sources ==
- Bruno Claußen entry in Das Deutsche Führerlexikon 1934-1935
- Bruno Claußen entry in the Files of the Reich Chancellery
- Lilla, Joachim (2005). Der Preußische Staatsrat 1921–1933: Ein biographisches Handbuch. Düsseldorf: Droste Verlag. ISBN 978-3-770-05271-4.
