= Rudolf Brinkmann (economist) =

German economist and banker

State Secretary Reich and Prussian Ministry of Economics
- In office 4 February 1938 – 11 May 1939
- Preceded by: Hans Ernst Posse
- Succeeded by: Friedrich Landfried

Vice President of the Reichsbank
- In office 21 January 1939 – 11 May 1939
- Preceded by: Friedrich Dreyse
- Succeeded by: Emil Puhl

Personal details
- Born: 28 August 1893 Einbeck, Province of Hanover, Kingdom of Prussia, German Empire
- Died: 1 August 1955 (age 61) Berlin, West Germany
- Education: University of Bonn; Humboldt University of Berlin
- Profession: Economist, Banker

Military service
- Allegiance: German Empire
- Branch/service: Imperial German Army
- Years of service: 1914–1916
- Rank: Gefreiter
- Unit: 46th (Lower Saxony) Field Artillery Regiment
- Battles/wars: World War I

Rudolf Brinkmann (28 August 1893 – 1 August 1955 (Note: Sources differ as to the date of death. Joachim Lilla (2005) states that it was 1 August 1955 in Berlin; Reinhold Zilch & Bärbel Holtz (2004) state only that it was "after 1973".)) was a German economist and banker who rose to become a State Secretary in the Reich and Prussian Ministry of Economics and the Vice President of the Reichsbank in Nazi Germany. After only about a year in office, he had a nervous breakdown, was hospitalized for a severe psychiatric condition and relieved of his posts.

== Early life ==
Brinkmann was born in Greene, a district in the city of Einbeck. After obtaining his Abitur, he studied political science and economics at the University of Bonn and the Humboldt University of Berlin. At the outbreak of the First World War in August 1914, he joined the Imperial German Army and served as a front line soldier in the 46th (Lower Saxony) Field Artillery Regiment. In March 1916, he was discharged from the army with the rank of Gefreiter because of an injury which rendered him unfit for further military service. He began a career in banking, and worked from 1919 in Göttingen for the Reichsbank. In 1923, he took over the management of the Reichsbank's audit office in Berlin and later served as an auxiliary worker at the bank's board of directors. Afterwards, he joined the board of the Reichsbank branch in Hamburg and, in 1931, he became director of the branch bank in Aschaffenburg.

== Career in Nazi Germany ==
After the Nazi seizure of power Brinkmann, in spring of 1933, became a board member at the Deutsche Golddiskontbank. In the Reich and Prussian Ministry of Economic Affairs, Brinkmann in 1934 worked under Reichsminister Hjalmar Schacht, initially as a Generalreferent (general consultant). On 28 February 1936, he attained a seat on the Reichsbank board of directors. On 4 February 1938, the new Reichsminister of Economics, Walther Funk, promoted Brinkmann to principal State Secretary of the ministry, replacing Hans Ernst Posse. At the same time, he was appointed to membership on the Prussian State Council by Prussian Minister President Hermann Göring. From 1938 to 1939 he was also on the board of the Reichswerke Hermann Göring, a large industrial conglomerate. On 20 April 1938, he joined the Allgemeine SS (SS number 308,241) and was promoted to the rank of SS-Oberführer on 9 November 1938.

On 20 January 1939, Funk replaced Hjalmar Schacht as president of the Reichsbank, and the next day named Brinkmann as his vice president. In this role, Brinkmann was expected to virtually run the bank, as Funk had no actual training or experience in banking. In particular, he was expected to fill Schacht's role as Germany's representative in international finance. Whether he became a member of the Nazi Party in 1939 is unclear. Brinkmann was also a board member of the Vereinigte Elektrizitätswerke Westfalen (United Electricity Works of Westphalia) and the Bank for International Settlements.

== Hospitalization ==
On 17 February 1939, it was announced that Brinkmann was placed on an indefinite leave of absence due to illness. This was apparently acute manic-depression, which was described as a "severe nervous breakdown". On 11 May 1939, due to the duration of his illness, Brinkmann was retired and admitted to a psychiatric hospital in Bonn, where he remained in a closed ward until the end of the Second World War. Friedrich Landfried succeeded him as State Secretary in the Reich Ministry of Economics, and Emil Puhl as Vice President of the Reichsbank. Little is known about Brinkmann's subsequent life.
