= German Student Corps =

Student fraternities in Germany

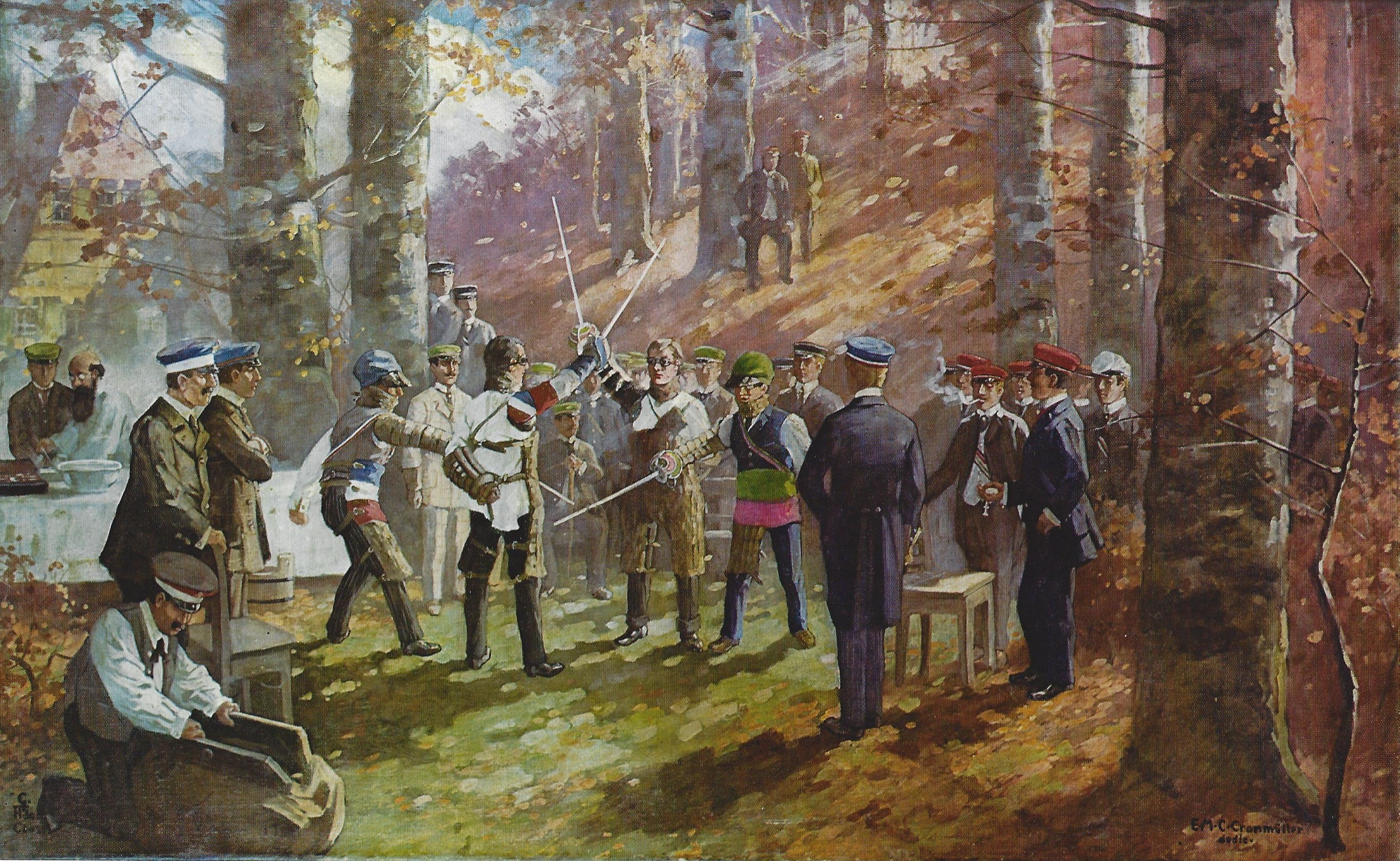
German Corps Students value their engagements in academic "Mensur" fencing, here an example in a forest near Tübingen by Gustav Adolf Closs, 1890.

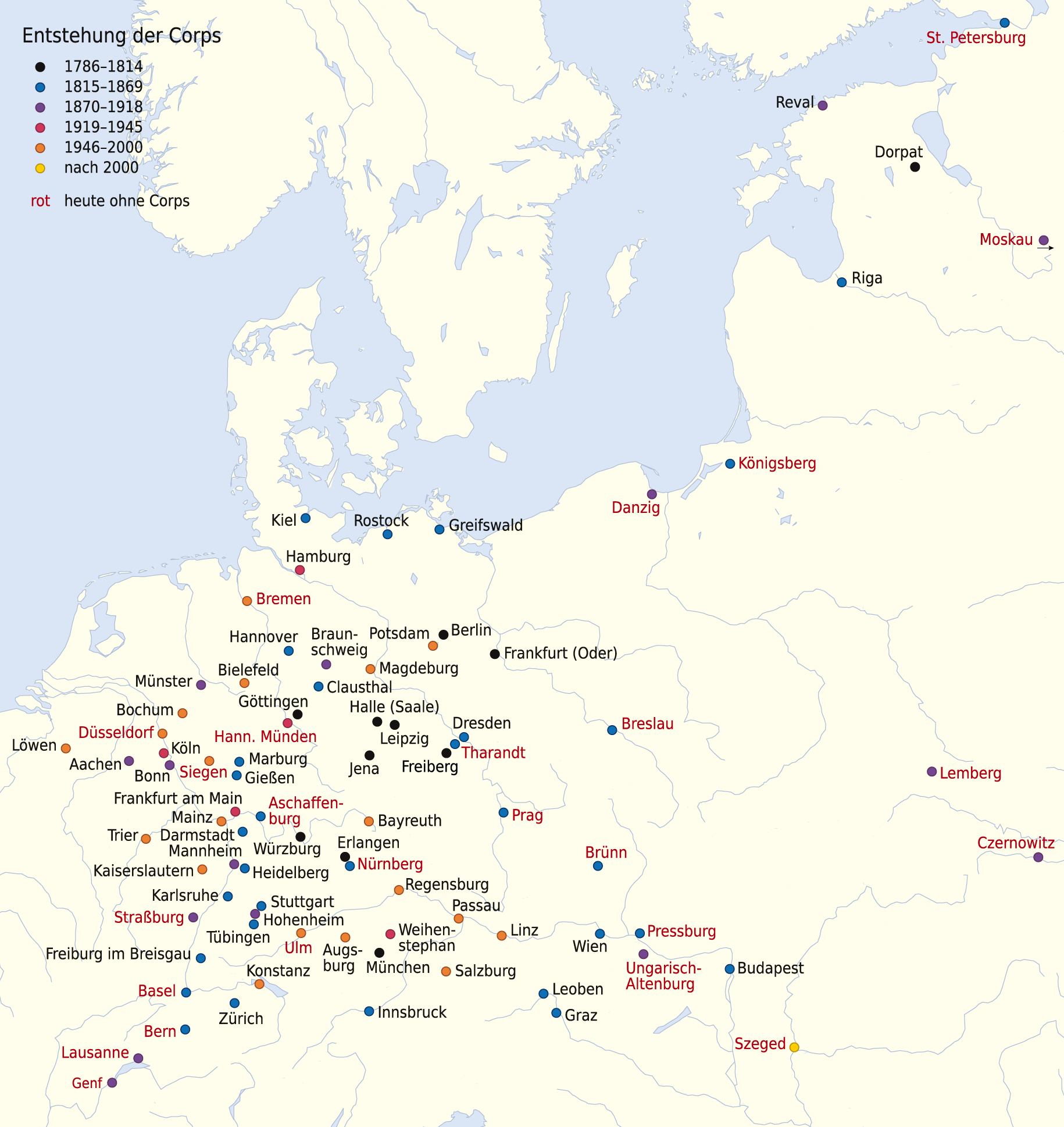
Emergence of Corps in Europe

Corps (or Korps; "das ~" (n), German pronunciation: [ˈkoːɐ] (sg.), [ˈkoːɐs] (pl.)) are the oldest still-existing kind of Studentenverbindung, Germany's traditional university corporations; their roots date back to the 15th century. The oldest corps still existing today was founded in 1789. Its members are referred to as corps students (Corpsstudenten). The corps belong to the tradition of student fraternities which wear couleur and practice academic fencing.

Most corps are organized in two federations, the Kösener Senioren-Convents-Verband (KSCV) and the Weinheimer Senioren-Convent (WSC). Together, they comprise 162 Corps throughout Germany, Austria, Belgium, Estonia, Latvia, Hungary, Switzerland and Lithuania.

The German Student Corps were traditionally recruited from the nobility, royalty, and social elite, and are traditionally viewed as more aristocratic and elitist than other German student fraternities such as the Catholic Cartellverband and the Burschenschaften. They consider tolerance and individuality to be key tenets and are rooted in German idealism. By and large, they are generally conservative in political outlook, but less right-wing and less nationalist than the Burschenschaften. The corps are open to students of all nationalities and religions, unlike many other student fraternities. Although distinct, the corps are in some aspects similar to and serve many of the same purposes as college fraternities found in the United States.

== Characterization ==
Corps are built upon the principle of tolerance: No corps may endorse a certain political, scientific, or religious viewpoint. In addition, all members are solely chosen by their personal character. Neither national, ethnic, nor social provenance play a role.

Corpsstudenten (corps students) wear couleur (colored stripes and caps) and practice Mensuren, academic fencing with razor-sharp blades that can result in bleeding face wounds, Schmisse, although in modern times very few Korps from all countries still practise Mensur with minimal protection that can result in scars. In most Korps, it is now largely symbolic and performed with extensive protection not unlike fencing. The corps usually bear names that reflect their former origin from certain German regions, such as Saxonia (Saxony) or Guestphalia (Westphalia). Formerly, when a distance of a few hundred kilometres between a student's home town and his university meant weeks of travel, students from the same part of Germany traveled together and formed some kind of "new family". The distance, plus the fact that they carried the money for a complete semester with them in a bag, might also explain why students began fencing, simply for self-defense, for students, military officers, and aristocrats were the only people allowed to carry arms.

Like all Studentenverbindungen, corps consist of two bodies: The active part consists of all members, that still study and have duties for the fraternity, and the so-called Altherrenschaft (alumni organization), comprising all those who graduated and thus provide the bear share of the monetary stimulus for the fraternity. A fundamental idea is that older students should help their younger fellows, and this principle dominates the relationship between the two bodies. The former keeps the everyday business of the corps alive, organizes gatherings, and keeps the Corpshaus (Corps House) in order. The Altherrenschaft, graduates with regular incomes, provide financial support. This usually means quite cheap housing for the younger members among other things. The Altherrenschaft has the power to intervene in the business of the active members, typically to ensure the principles and spirit of their corps.

The active body is headed by a panel of three Chargierte (charged persons), who are elected by all active, full members at the beginning of each semester (or at the end of the former one). Their functions are called Senior, Consenior and Drittchargierter (meaning third charged person, also named Subsenior in some corps).:

- The Senior is responsible for all corps affairs in general, but leading and heading gatherings and events in special; he supplements his signature with a single cross (x) (in some corps with three crosses (xxx)) as an external sign of his duties.
- The Consenior teaches fencing to all members of the inner corps and assures the execution of the Mensuren in coordination with the Conseniors of other corps; his signature is enhanced by two crosses (xx).
- The Drittchargierter (also known as Sekretär, Secretary) has administrative tasks like paperwork and often the task of a treasurer; his sign is three crosses (xxx) (in some corps one cross (x)).

Being the oldest of their kind, the corps tend to treat all other forms of German Studentenverbindungen with contempt; corps despise all posturing and affectation (e.g. the overly use of Latinisms) that other kinds of Studentenverbindungen, esp. Catholic corporations and Burschenschaften show.

Even with the principle of tolerance being a central aspect in each corps' self-image, every corps student is urged to develop his own viewpoints, to stand for them and to strongly participate in society, whether in politics, economy, or social affairs. This encouragement for ethics and self-confidence on one hand, and the absence of a limitation to certain views on the other, let Corps students often show up as the leading figures of the most diverse political directions. The emphasis on individuality brought many corps students in opposition to totalitarian regimes, such as the National Socialist dictatorship.

The object and purpose of the Corps was and still is solely the education of students to become a strong, free and cosmopolitan personality who is not held back by religious, racist, national, scientific or philosophical limitations of the mind. Three primary institutions within the fraternity aid with achieving this aim; including the Corpsconvent [regular council meetings of the Corps Brothers], the Kneipe [celebratory get-together of Corps Brothers with speeches, beer and songs], and today's Bestimmungsmensur [the event of academic fencing with sharp blades for the first or one of the first times], where the ones to fence are chosen on the basis of placing two equal opponents in front of each other. [...] This experience, and the intertwined need to overcome one's own fear, dedicated to the union of his Corps, and the connected strengthening of the sense of community aids the personal growth just as does taking a hit without losing one's stand and accepting the assessment of the Mensur by the own Corps Brothers.

— de:Hermann Rink

The Weinheimer Student Corps also maintain a confederation with Tau Kappa Epsilon fraternity, a college Fraternity with over 270 chapters in the United States and Canada.

== History ==
The Corps sprang from the older Landsmannschaft. The name Corps came into use in 1810 at the University of Heidelberg and soon displaced the older name of Landsmannschaft at all the universities. The oldest still active Corps are the 1789 founded Guestphalia at the University of Halle, the 1798 founded Onoldia at the University of Erlangen who are both members of the KSCV and as a member of the WSC the Saxo-Montania founded also 1798 at the Bergakademie Freiberg today at the RWTH Aachen University. After the Carlsbad Decrees of 1819, the Corps were exposed to harsh persecution by university and state officials just like their rivals as at the universities in Germany the Burschenschaften. After 1848, they were officially approved.

== Notable members ==
Following is a select list of members of German students corps

=== Politics ===
- Sir William Beale, 1st Baronet, M.P. Ayrshire, Corps Rhenania Heidelberg
- Otto von Bismarck, Chancellor of Prussia, later of the German Empire, "architect" of Germany's unification, Corps Hannovera Göttingen
- Bruno Claußen, German lawyer, civil servant and business executive, State Secretary in the Prussian Ministry of Economics and Labor, Corps Franconia Tübingen
- Max von Forckenbeck, German politician, founder of the German Progress Party and National Liberal Party, mayor of Berlin and President of the Reichstag, Corps Teutonia Giessen
- Erich Gritzbach, Chief of the staff office of the Prussian State Ministry, Berliner Burschenschaft Gothia
- Ulrich von Hassell, German ambassador in Belgrade and Rome, resistance fighter in Nazi Germany, executed by the Nazis after the failed July 20 Plot, Corps Suevia Tübingen
- Friedrich Hecker, German revolutionary, Corps Rhenania Heidelberg
- Johannes Krohn, German lawyer and civil servant, State Secretary in the Reich Ministry of Labor, Leipziger Burschenschaft Germania
- Friedrich Landfried, German lawyer and civil servant, State Secretary in the Prussian Ministry of Finance and the Reich Ministry of Economics, Corps Rhenania Straßburg and Corps Vandalia Heidelberg
- Wilhelm Liebknecht, co-founder of the German social-democratic party, chief editor of the "Vorwärts"-Paper, Corps Hasso-Nassovia Marburg, Corps Rhenania Gießen
- Karl Marx, socialist author and theoretician, proponent of communism, Corps Palatia Bonn
- Kurt Melcher, German lawyer and politician, Police President of Essen and Berlin, Corps Suevia Tübingen
- Hans Pfundtner, German lawyer and civil servant, the senior State Secretary in the Reich Interior Ministry, Corps Masovia Königsberg zu Potsdam
- Wilhelm II of Germany, last German Kaiser, Corps Borussia Bonn

=== Sciences ===
- Alois Alzheimer, neurologist, Corps Franconia Würzburg
- Emil von Behring, physician, Nobel Prize laureate, Corps Suevo-Borussia Hamburg
- Karl Ferdinand Braun, physicist, Nobel Prize laureate, inventor of the cathode-ray tube Corps Teutonia Marburg
- Alfred Brehm, naturalist and author (zoological encyclopedia Brehms Tierleben), Corps Saxonia Jena
- Vincenz Czerny (1842-1916), surgeon, Corps Austria Frankfurt.
- Paul Güssfeldt, geologist, mountaineer and explorer, Corps Vandalia Heidelberg.
- Justus von Liebig, chemist, founder of organic and agricultural chemistry, Corps Rhenania Erlangen.
- Joseph von Lindwurm, physician and dermatologist, Corps Bavaria Würzburg.
- Alfred Pribram (1841-1912), internist, Corps Austria.
- Philipp Franz von Siebold, physician, emerged as the first European to teach Western medicine in Japan, Corps Moenania Würzburg
- Eckard Wimmer, virologist, synthesized a virus chemically, Corps Teutonia-Hercynia Göttingen.

=== Economy and engineering ===
- Gottlieb Daimler, engineer, Corps Stauffia Stuttgart
- Rudolph Hering, American engineer, Corps Altsachsen
- Alfred Herrhausen, CEO of the Deutsche Bank, murdered by Red Army Faction-terrorists in 1989, Corps Hansea Köln
- Ludwig Mond, chemist and industrialist, Corps Rhenania Heidelberg
- Wilhelm von Opel, engineer, Corps Franconia Darmstadt
- Hanns-Martin Schleyer, board member of Daimler-Benz, formerly leading member of the National Socialist Student Association, later head of the employer's confederation and of West Germany's federal industry confederation, murdered by Red Army Faction terrorists in 1977, Corps Suevia Heidelberg
- Max Wirth, journalist and economist, Corps Rhenania Heidelberg

=== Fine arts and culture ===
- Heinrich Heine, German poet and journalist, Corps Guestphalia Göttingen
- Georg Heym, poet, most important exponent of early expressionism, Corps Rhenania Würzburg
- Egon Erwin Kisch, Czech-German author und journalist, corps student in Prag
- Robert Schumann, composer and pianist, Corps Saxo-Borussia Heidelberg
- Ludwig Thoma, author, publisher and editor, Corps Suevia Munich
- Richard Wagner, composer, Corps Saxonia Leipzig
