= Friedrich Landfried =

German lawyer and civil servant

State Secretary Reich Ministry of Economics
- In office 18 March 1939 – November 1943
- Preceded by: Rudolf Brinkmann

State Secretary Prussian Ministry of Finance
- In office 21 April 1933 – November 1943

Personal details
- Born: 26 September 1884 Heidelberg, Kingdom of Württemberg, German Empire
- Died: 31 December 1952 (aged 68) Hamburg, West Germany
- Party: German National People's Party
- Education: University of Strasbourg; Heidelberg University; Humboldt University of Berlin; University of Freiburg
- Occupation: Lawyer

Military service
- Allegiance: German Empire; Weimar Republic; Nazi Germany
- Branch/service: Imperial German Army; Reichswehr; Luftwaffe
- Years of service: 1914–1918; 1919–1920; 1936–1945
- Rank: Hauptmann; Major (Luftwaffe)
- Unit: 15th (1st Upper Alsatian) Field Artillery Regiment; Guards Cavalry Rifle Division
- Battles/wars: World War I World War II
- Awards: Iron Cross, 1st and 2nd class War Merit Cross

Friedrich Anton Walter Landfried (26 September 1884 – 31 December 1952) was a German lawyer and civil servant in the Weimar Republic and Nazi Germany. Between 1933 and 1943 he was State Secretary in the Prussian Ministry of Finance, and from 1939 also in the Reich Ministry of Economics.

== Early life ==
Landfried came from a well-established family of Heidelberg manufacturers; his father had been granted the honorary title of "Councillor of Commerce". After obtaining his Abitur from the Gymnasium in Heidelberg, Landfried entered the 15th (1st Upper Alsatian) Field Artillery Regiment of the Prussian Army in Strasbourg as a one-year volunteer in 1903–1904. He then was accepted as a law student at the University of Strasbourg. While a student there, he joined the Corps Rhenania where he engaged in academic fencing.

Discharged as a Leutnant of reserves, Landfried continued his education and transferred to Heidelberg University, where he joined the Corps Vandalia. He then attended the Humboldt University of Berlin and the University of Freiburg. He passed the first Referendar state examination in Freiburg in 1909 and became a doctor of law. After he had passed the Assessor examination, he established himself as a lawyer. He returned to active duty with his old regiment in 1912 and served in the First World War on the eastern and western fronts. He was promoted to Hauptmann and became an artillery battery commander, earning the Iron Cross, 1st and 2nd class. After the end of the war, he remained in the military with the Guards Cavalry Rifle Division, which was very like a Freikorps unit, until July 1920.

== Career in the Weimar Republic and Nazi Germany ==
Seeing more career advancement opportunity in civil administration than in the small Reichswehr of the Weimar Republic mandated by the Treaty of Versailles, Landfried entered the civil service of the Free State of Prussia in 1920. On 1 July he obtained an appointment as a government lawyer at the Koblenz regional administration. Six months later he transferred to the Kassel administration as a Regierungsrat (Government Councillor). In 1923 he became an auxiliary employee of both the Prussian Ministry of the Interior and the Prussian Ministry of Finance, becoming a Ministerialrat (Ministerial Councillor) at Finance in December 1925. In July 1932 he was promoted to Ministerialdirektor at the Prussian State Ministry (cabinet office). Politically conservative, Landfried sat on the board of the German National People's Party.

After the Nazi seizure of power in early 1933, Landfried was promoted to the rank of State Secretary on 1 April and, on 21 April, became the State Secretary of the Prussian Ministry of Finance under Minister Johannes Popitz. On 31 July 1933, Prussian Minister President Hermann Göring appointed him to the Prussian State Council. In December 1935, he was made vice president of the examination board for senior civil servants. After the establishment of the Four Year Plan in October 1936, Landfried became a member of its General Council. In 1936 he also became a Major in the Luftwaffe reserves and, on 7 February 1939, a Brigadeführer in the National Socialist Flyers Corps.

On 18 March 1939, Landfried was assigned to take over the duties of Rudolf Brinkmann, the State Secretary in the Reich Ministry of Economics, who was placed on medical leave. When Brinkmann was retired on 11 May, Landfried became his permanent replacement while also retaining his post in the Prussian Ministry of Finance. He held all these posts until he left the civil service in November 1943. In addition, Landfried was a member of the Supervisory Board of the Reichswerke Hermann Göring, serving as a deputy chairman from July 1939 to January 1941 and then as first deputy chairman until December 1942. Landfried was also a member of the Wirtschaftsorganisation Ost#Wirtschaftsführungsstab Ost (Economic Command Staff East) and most likely was a participant in its so-called "Meeting of the State Secretaries" of 2 May 1941, which discussed plans for the invasion of the Soviet Union. This meeting determined that the need for the army to live off the land by confiscation of crops and livestock would necessarily involve the starvation of millions of Russians.

After retiring in November 1943, Landfried was assigned as deputy chief of the Military Administration of Italy under SS-Obergruppenführer Karl Wolff in early 1944. In September 1944, SS-Gruppenführer Otto Wächter succeeded him in this Italian command. From 5 January until 8 May 1945, Landfried functioned as the acting president of the Prussian State bank. In addition, Landfried sat on the boards of many large German corporations. He was chairman of the Supervisory Boards of Preußische Bergwerks- und Hütten AG, Saargruben AG mining company, Hibernia AG coal company and the VEBA electricity and mining company. He also was made an honorary senator at the University of Heidelberg in March 1941.

== Post-war life ==
After the end of the Second World War in Europe, the Allies placed Landfried under arrest. His writing on "The Economic Policy of Frederick the Great and National Socialist Germany" was placed on the list of proscribed materials in the Soviet zone of occupation. On the night of 10 May 1947, he attempted suicide by slitting an artery, but survived and was transferred to the internment hospital in Garmisch-Partenkirchen. Released from custody later in 1947, he moved to Hamburg with his wife, where he became a member of the Evangelisches Hilfswerk, a relief organization of the Evangelical Church in Germany. He died in Hamburg on 31 December 1952.

== Sources ==
- Klee, Ernst (2007). Das Personenlexikon zum Dritten Reich. Wer war was vor und nach 1945. Frankfurt-am-Main: Fischer-Taschenbuch-Verlag. ISBN 978-3-596-16048-8.
- Lilla, Joachim (2005). Der Preußische Staatsrat 1921–1933: Ein biographisches Handbuch. Düsseldorf: Droste Verlag. ISBN 978-3-770-05271-4.
- Zilch, Reinhold and Holtz, Baerbel (editors) (2004). Acta Borussica: Die Protokolle des preußischen Staatsministeriums, Volume 12/II 1925–1938, Hildesheim: Georg Olms Verlag, p. 626, ISBN 3-487-12704-0.
