= Elhard von Morozowicz =

German paramilitary leader and politician

Jungstahlhelmführer Der Stahlhelm
- In office 23 March 1930 – 26 July 1933
- Preceded by: Position created

Brandenburg Landesführer Der Stahlhelm
- In office 1924 – 26 July 1933

Brandenburg Landesführer Wehrwolf
- In office 1923–1928

Additional positions
- 1933–1934: Member of the Prussian State Council
- 1933–1934: Member of the Reichstag
- 1932–1933: Member of the Landtag of Prussia

Personal details
- Born: 14 April 1893 Berlin, Kingdom of Prussia, German Empire
- Died: 31 January 1934 (aged 40) Berlin, Nazi Germany
- Cause of death: Automobile accident
- Party: Nazi Party
- Other political affiliations: German National People's Party
- Occupation: Military officer Estate manager

Military service
- Allegiance: German Empire
- Branch/service: Royal Prussian Army
- Years of service: 1911–1918
- Rank: Rittmeister
- Unit: 3rd (1st Brandenburg) Uhlans Regiment
- Battles/wars: World War I
- Awards: Iron Cross, 1st and 2nd class

Hans Elhard von Morozowicz (14 April 1893 – 31 January 1934) was a German military officer, a high-ranking official in Der Stahlhelm and a Gruppenführer in the Sturmabteilung (SA). He was also a deputy in the Reichstag and died in an automobile accident at age 40.

== Early life ==
Morozowicz was born in Berlin into a family of landed gentry from the Neumark area of the Province of Brandenburg. After graduating from secondary school at the Friedrichsgymnasium in Frankfurt (Oder), Morozowicz pursued a military career with the Royal Prussian Army in 1911. At the beginning of the First World War in 1914, he was an active-duty Leutnant in the 3rd (1st Brandenburg) Uhlans Regiment "Emperor Alexander II of Russia", headquartered in Fürstenwalde. In 1916, he entered the Prussian General Staff as an Oberleutnant. After the end of the war, Morozowicz left military service with the rank of Rittmeister. He acquired an estate near Podelzig, where he devoted himself to farming.

== Paramilitary activities in the Weimar Republic ==
In the immediate post-war period under the Weimar Republic, Morozowicz belonged to a Freikorps unit. Also in 1919, he joined Der Stahlhelm, the association of German veterans that was closely allied with the conservative German National People's Party (DNVP). He became the association's Landesführer (state leader) for Brandenburg in 1924 and, on 23 March 1930, he also was named to the new position of Jungstahlhelmführer, heading the association's youth group that would include military eligible men between the ages of 18 and 35. In addition, from 1923 to 1928 he was the Brandenburg leader of Wehrwolf, a nationalist and anti-republican paramilitary association, mainly consisting of former Freikorps members.

From 1931, Morozowicz was also a member of the Gesellschaft zum Studium des Faschismus (Society for the Study of Fascism). This organization supported unifying Germany's right-wing political organizations and advocated establishing an authoritarian government based on Italian-style fascism. Morozowicz, however, still harbored monarchist sympathies, and at the 1932 Prussian state election on 24 April, was elected to the Landtag of Prussia as a member of the DNVP. He remained in office until this body was dissolved in October 1933. At a rally of 5,000 Stahlhelm members attended by the German Crown Prince Wilhelm at Perleberg on 20 June 1932, Morozowicz said in a welcoming address: "the future German state will be one ruled by a German emperor".

== Career in Nazi Germany ==
Following the Nazi seizure of power and the Gleichschaltung (coordination) process, both the Stahlhelm and the Wehrwolf organizations were forcibly incorporated into the Sturmabteilung (SA), the Nazi Party's paramilitary unit. Morozowicz entered into the SA with the rank of SA-Gruppenführer on 26 July 1933, where he served on the staff of the Obersten SA-Führung (Supreme SA Leadership). The Jungstahlhelm had been renamed the Wehrstahlhelm and Morozowicz, now styled Wehrstahlhelm-Reichsführer, was put in charge of integrating it into the SA.

In addition, Morozowicz also was named as a deputy to Konstantin Hierl, the head of the Freiwilliger Arbeitsdienst (Voluntary Labor Service) in the Reich Ministry of Labor. On 11 July 1933, Prussian Minister president Hermann Göring appointed him to the recently reconstituted Prussian State Council. At the November 1933 German parliamentary election, Morozowicz was elected as a Nazi Party deputy to the Reichstag for electoral constituency 2 (Berlin). He died in an automobile accident in Berlin, less than three months later.

== Sources ==
- Campbell, Bruce (1998). The SA Generals and the Rise of Nazism. Lexington: University Press of Kentucky. ISBN 978-0-813-12047-8.
- Elhard von Morozowicz entry in the Files of the Reich Chancellery (Weimar Republic).
- Fricke, Dieter (ed.) (1968). Die bürgerlichen Parteien in Deutschland. Band II, Das Europäische Buch, Berlin.
- Information about Elhard von Morozowicz in the Reichstag database
- Lilla, Joachim (2005). Der Preußische Staatsrat 1921–1933: Ein biographisches Handbuch. Düsseldorf: Droste Verlag. ISBN 978-3-770-05271-4.
- Werberg, Dennis (2023). Der Stahlhelm – Bund der Frontsoldaten. De Gruyter. ISBN 978-3-111-08234-9.
