= Johannes Krohn =

German lawyer and civil servant

State Secretary, Reich Ministry of Labor (From 1 April 1935, the Reich and Prussian Ministry of Labor)
- In office 24 February 1933 – mid-1939
- Preceded by: Andreas Grieser
- Succeeded by: Friedrich Syrup

Reichskommissar for Administration of Enemy Assets, Reich Ministry of Justice
- In office 1 November 1941 – 8 May 1945
- Preceded by: Office created
- Succeeded by: Office abolished

Personal details
- Born: 4 July 1884 Stettin, Province of Pomerania, Kingdom of Prussia, German Empire
- Died: 11 July 1974 (aged 90) Bad Neuenahr-Ahrweiler, Rhineland-Palatinate, West Germany
- Party: Nazi Party
- Education: University of Freiburg; Leipzig University; Kiel University; Martin Luther University of Halle-Wittenberg
- Profession: Lawyer

Military service
- Allegiance: German Empire; Nazi Germany
- Branch/service: Imperial German Army; German Army
- Years of service: 1906–1907; 1914–1918; 1939–1941
- Rank: Hauptmann of reserves
- Battles/wars: World War I World War II
- Awards: Iron Cross, 1st and 2nd class Clasp to the Iron Cross, 1st and 2nd class Wound Badge

Johannes Krohn (4 July 1884 – 11 July 1974) was a German lawyer and civil servant who became the State Secretary of the Reich Ministry of Labor in Nazi Germany from 1933 to 1939.

== Early life and education ==
Born the son of an auditor in Stettin (today, Szczecin), Krohn obtained his Abitur from the König-Wilhelm-Gymnasium in Magdeburg in 1903 and then studied law from 1903 to 1906 at the University of Freiburg, Leipzig University, Kiel University and the Martin Luther University of Halle-Wittenberg. While in Leipzig, he became a member of the Germania student corps. Passing his Referendar examination in June 1906, he performed mandatory military service as a one-year volunteer from October 1906 to October 1907 and then entered on a legal clerkship. In 1911 he earned his doctorate in law, passed the Assessor examination in January 1912 and worked as a court assessor in Magdeburg. In 1914, he became a city councilor in Staßfurt, serving until 1920. He returned to military service in the First World War, earning the Iron Cross, first and second class, as well as the Wound Badge. He rose to the rank of Hauptmann in the infantry reserves before being discharged in 1919.

== Civil service career ==
=== Under the Weimar Republic ===
Krohn obtained an entry-level position with the Weimar Republic's Reich Insurance Office in 1919, and became a Regierungsrat (Government Councilor) the next year. In 1921, he entered the Reich Labor Ministry, advancing to Oberregierungsrat in 1921 and Ministerialrat (Ministerial Councilor) in 1923. From 1923 to 1928, he headed a sub-department of social insurance, advancing to director of the Social Insurance Department from 1928 to 1932. Promoted to Ministerial Director, he became head of Main Department II (Social Insurance and Social Welfare) on 15 June 1932.

=== State Secretary in Nazi Germany ===
Shortly after the Nazi seizure of power on 30 January 1933, Krohn was promoted to State Secretary in the Reich Ministry of Labor under Reichsminister Franz Seldte on 24 February. As the ministry's senior civil servant, he was involved in implementing the Law for the Restoration of the Professional Civil Service of 7 April 1933 that provided for the dismissal from the ministry of Jews, Communist Party members, and other perceived opponents of the regime. He also was instrumental in drafting the law of 19 May 1933 that established the Trustee of Labour, by which the government sought to control labor relations. In October 1933, Krohn became a founding member of Hans Frank's Academy for German Law. Following the merger of the Prussian Ministry of Labor with the Reich Ministry of Labor on 1 April 1935, Krohn was named to the Prussian State Council by Prussian Minister president Hermann Göring. On 30 January 1938, Krohn became a member of the Nazi Party.

During his tenure as State Secretary, Krohn was largely given a free hand to develop policy due to his expertise in the area and to Seldte's relative disinterest in the specifics of social policy. Thus, Krohn was involved in the development of many discriminatory health care policies, such as the third implementing decree of the Law for the Prevention of Hereditarily Diseased Offspring, which he signed in February 1935. It mandated that state health insurance funds could be used to cover the costs of sterilizing those considered to have an hereditary illness. In October 1938, he likewise signed the Decree Concerning the Participation of Jews in Health Insurance Funds, thereby severely restricting the ability of Jewish doctors to practice medicine by refusing them the right to claim payment from the state health insurance fund. Krohn also was involved in formulating discriminatory social legislation. The Law Concerning Tenancy Arrangements for Jews, for example, was signed by Krohn in April 1939 and provided for the eviction of Jews from their homes if their landlord was German. The resultant homeless families then had to be sheltered by those Jews still in possession of their apartments. Krohn was eventually forced out of his position in mid-1939, following a years-long turf battle with Robert Ley, the head of the German Labor Front, who sought to progressively usurp the functions of the Ministry of Labor, as he attempted to turn his organization into a shadow labor ministry.

=== During the Second World War ===
After the beginning of the Second World War, Krohn was transferred to the General Government in October 1939 to set up the social administration in the occupied territory but personal and professional conflicts with Governor-General Hans Frank led to his removal in November. He then volunteered for military service and was severely wounded in 1940, earning the Clasp to the Iron Cross, 1st and 2nd class. After recovery from his wounds, he left the Wehrmacht and was appointed Reichskommissar for Administration of Enemy Assets in the Reich Ministry of Justice on 1 November 1941, serving there for the remainder of the war. In this position, he was active in the expropriation of assets in the occupied territories.

== Postwar life ==
Following the end of the war, Krohn was interned from June 1945 to May 1946 in the Bayreuth prison and in Internment Camp #6 in the Bavarian town of Moosburg an der Isar. After his release, he worked in an advisory capacity on the social legislation of the Federal Republic of Germany. From 1948 to 1953 he was chairman of arbitration boards for commercial and agricultural professional associations. From June 1953 to 1959 he was chairman of the Society for Insurance Science and Design in Cologne. From 1955 to 1968 he was chairman of the Federal Committee of Dentists and Health Insurance Companies and deputy chairman of the Federal Committee of Doctors and Health Insurance Companies. In 1954, he was awarded the Federal Cross of Merit and, in 1959, the University of Cologne awarded him an honorary doctorate. He died in Bad Neuenahr-Ahrweiler on 11 July 1974.

== Sources ==
- Das Deutsche Führerlexikon 1934-1935. Berlin: Verlagsanftalt Otto Stollberg G. m. b. H. 1934.
- Hansen, Eckhard; Tennstedt, Florian, eds. (2018). Biographisches Lexikon zur Geschichte der deutschen Sozialpolitik 1871 – 1945. Vol. 2: Sozialpolitiker in der Weimarer Republik und im Nationalsozialismus 1919 – 1945. Kassel: Kassel University Press. ISBN 978-3-737-60474-1.(Online, PDF; 3.9 MB)
- Klee, Ernst (2007). Das Personenlexikon zum Dritten Reich. Wer war was vor und nach 1945. Frankfurt-am-Main: Fischer-Taschenbuch-Verlag. ISBN 978-3-596-16048-8.
- Lilla, Joachim (2005). Der Preußische Staatsrat 1921–1933: Ein biographisches Handbuch. Düsseldorf: Droste Verlag. ISBN 978-3-770-05271-4.
- Nützenadel, Alexander (2020). Bureaucracy, Work and Violence: The Reich Ministry of Labour in Nazi Germany, 1933–1945. Berghahn Books. ISBN 978-1-789-20459-9.
