= Gustav Wagemann =

German lawyer, judge and civil servant

President Celle Hereditary Farm Court
- In office 9 September 1933 – 11 December 1933

Prussian State Councilor
- In office 14 September 1933 – 11 December 1933

Personal details
- Born: 27 August 1885 Hanover, Province of Hanover, Kingdom of Prussia, German Empire
- Died: 11 December 1933 (age 48) Hamburg, Nazi Germany
- Cause of death: Airplane crash
- Resting place: Wilmersdorfer Waldfriedhof, Stahnsdorf
- Party: Nazi Party
- Profession: Lawyer; Civil servant

Military service
- Allegiance: German Empire
- Branch/service: Imperial German Army
- Years of service: 1914–1916
- Rank: Artillery battery commander
- Unit: 46th (Lower Saxony) Field Artillery Regiment
- Battles/wars: World War I

Gustav Wagemann (27 August 1885 – 11 December 1933) was a German lawyer and judge who worked in the Prussian Ministry of Justice under the German Empire, the Weimar Republic and Nazi Germany. He died in an airplane accident in December 1933.

== Life ==
Wagemann was born in Hanover, studied law and passed both the Referendar and the Assessor state examinations with high honors. On 25 March 1914, he became a lawyer and joined the Prussian Ministry of Justice on 8 June 1914. However, upon the outbreak of the First World War he joined the Imperial German Army in August 1914 and served as an artillery battery commander on the front lines for two years. In December 1916, he was made a public prosecutor in Frankfurt am Main and, in August 1918, a Landrichter (District Judge) in Stolp (today, Słupsk).

After the end of the war and the fall of the German Empire, Wagemann continued his civil service career under the Weimar Republic and was named deputy head of the War Debt Investigation Commission in Berlin from 1 February to 12 October 1919. He then returned to the Prussian Ministry of Justice and steadily advanced through the bureaucracy, from 20 May 1921 as a Justizrat (Judicial Councilor), from 27 June 1923 as an Oberjustizrat (Senior Judicial Councilor) and from 10 November 1925 as a Ministerialrat (Ministerial Councilor). He joined the Nazi Party sometime before its assumption of the national government in January 1933. On 9 September 1933, Wagemann was named President of the Erbhofgericht (Hereditary Farm Court) in Celle. On 14 September, Prussian Minister-president Hermann Göring appointed him to the recently reconstituted Prussian State Council.

Wagemann died in a plane crash when it attempted to land in dense fog at the airport in Hamburg-Fuhlsbüttel on 11 December 1933. As a Prussian State Councilor, he was given a state funeral in Berlin that was attended by many Nazi dignitaries where he was eulogized by Prussian Minister of Justice Hanns Kerrl.

== See also ==
- Reichserbhofgesetz

== Sources ==
- Lilla, Joachim (2005). Der Preußische Staatsrat 1921–1933: Ein biographisches Handbuch. Düsseldorf: Droste Verlag. ISBN 978-3-770-05271-4.
- Gustav Wagemann entry in the Files of the Reich Chancellery (Weimar Republic)
