= Zündwaren monopoly =

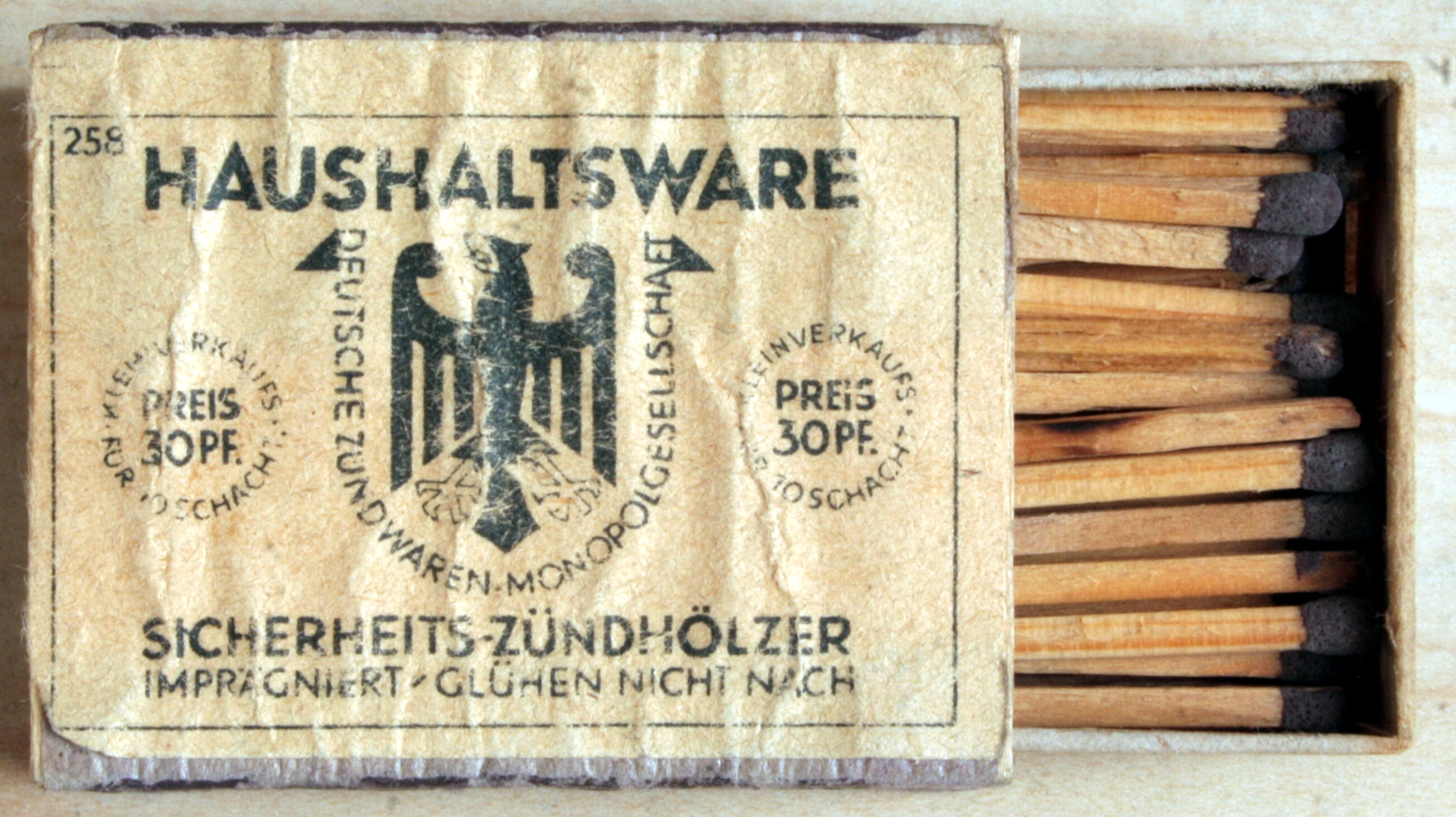
Haushaltsware 3 Pfennig (30 Pfennig for a package of 10 boxes)

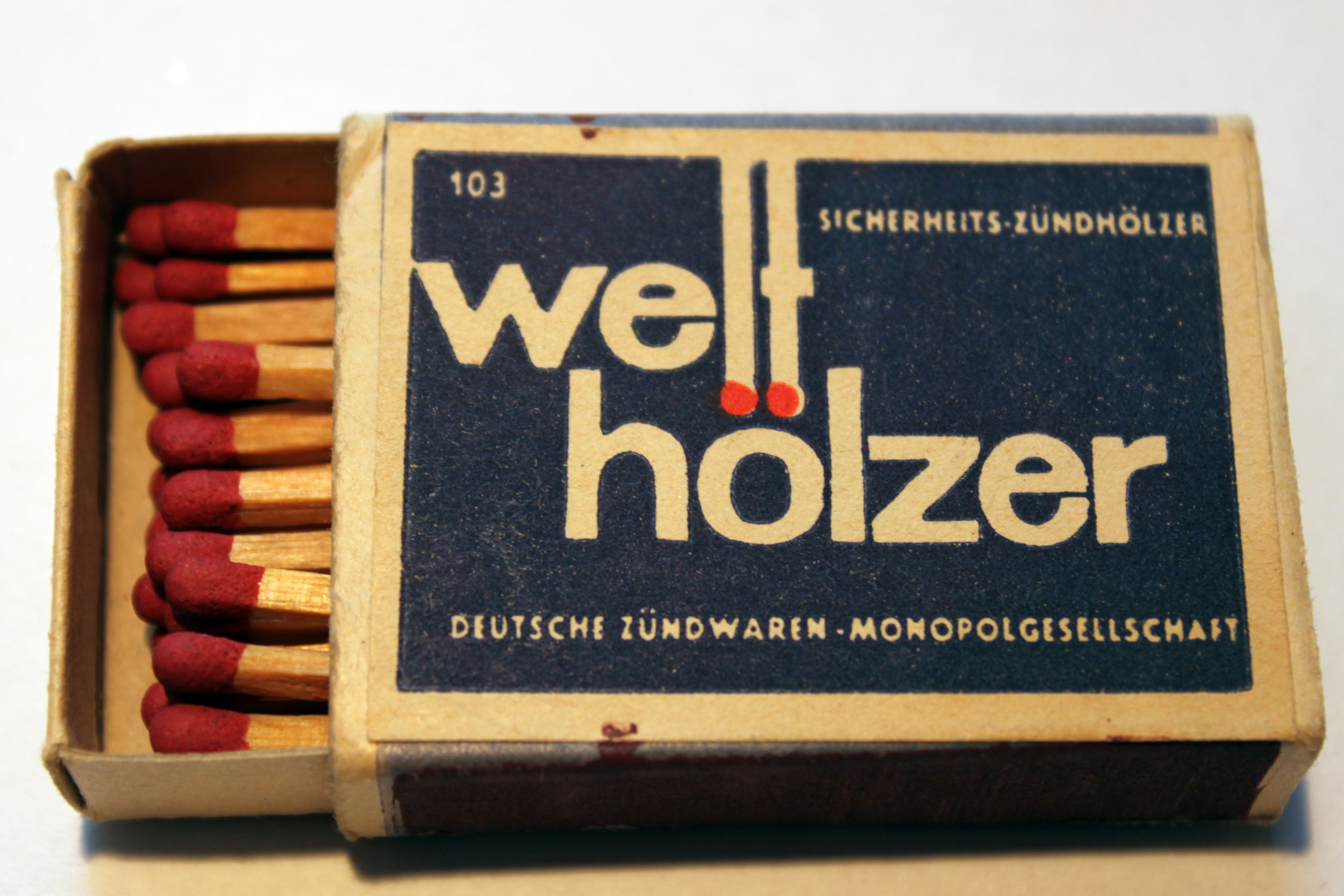
Post-war Welthölzer, Deutsche Zündwaren-Monopolgesellschaft

The German Zündwaren monopoly (translated Monopoly for Safety Matches) began in 1930 when Germany's Reichstag passed a bill named Zündwarenmonopolgesetz ("Safety Matches Monopoly Law"), which allowed the Deutsche Zündwaren-Monopolgesellschaft (translated "German Society for the Safety Matches Monopoly") exclusive rights to distribute safety matches within the borders of the German Empire. The only brands the Deutsche Zündwaren-Monopolgesellschaft could distribute were Welthölzer ("World Matches") and Haushaltsware ("Household article"). Local German manufacturers obtained licenses to produce preassigned volumes to sell domestically and were not allowed to export these matches or to establish new firms.

The official monopoly had been acquired by Swedish entrepreneur Ivar Kreuger, the "Match King", which made him a very rich man and remained in effect after the conclusion of World War II and through to 1983. In 1930 the Weimar Republic struggled to deal with war reparations as determined by the Treaty of Versailles while it also tried to tackle the Great Depression. Ivar Kreuger mediated German-French reparation talks and provided Germany with a loan of 125 million Dollars (at that time 500 million Reichsmark). The bonds ran until 15. January 1983 at which time the monopoly arrangement ended. After that, the price for safety matches in Germany fell by a third.

East Germany (1949-1990) did not recognize the effects of the Zündwaren monopoly, no payments were made.

== Gallery ==
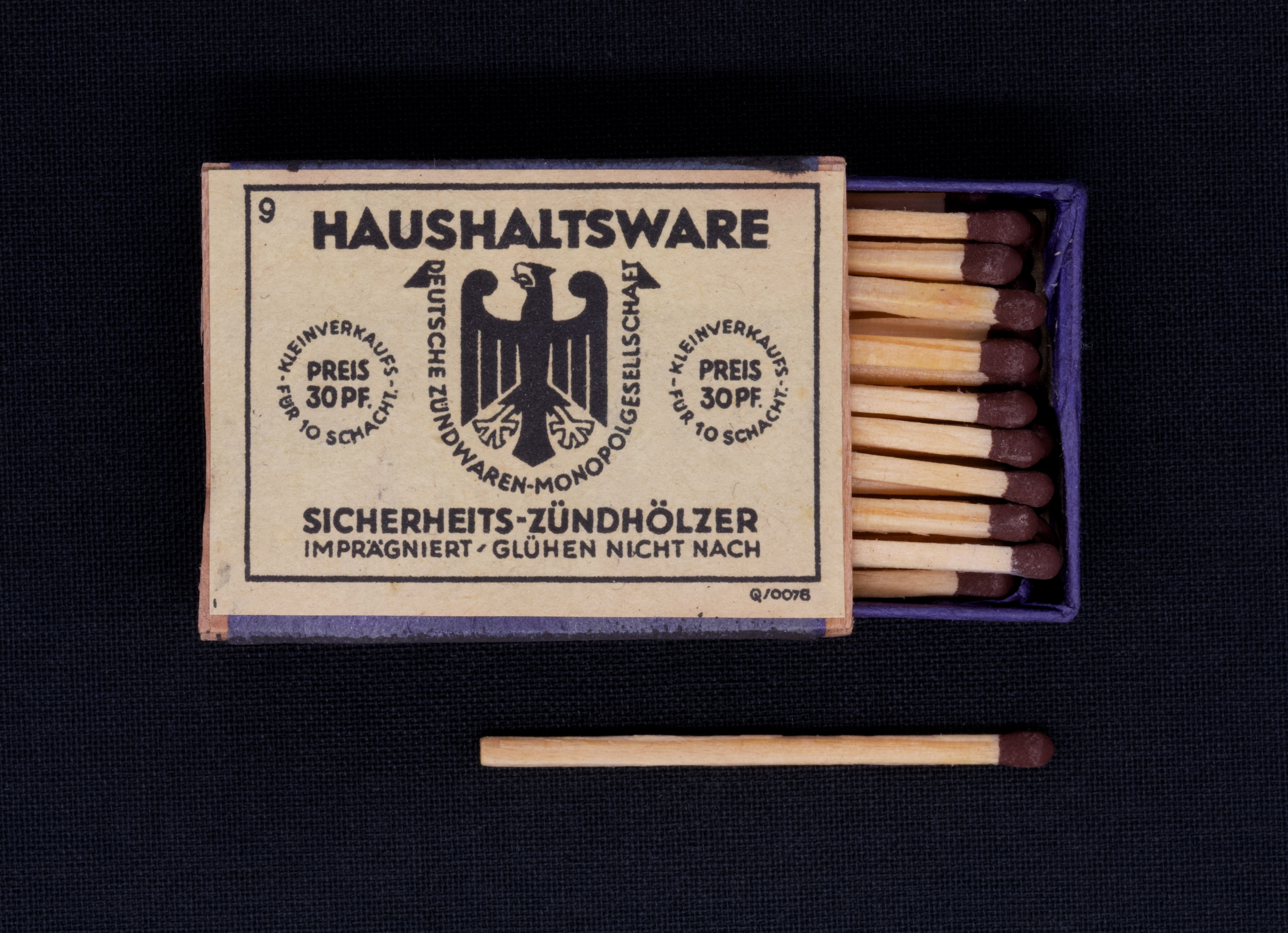
Haushaltsware 3 Pfennig until 1945

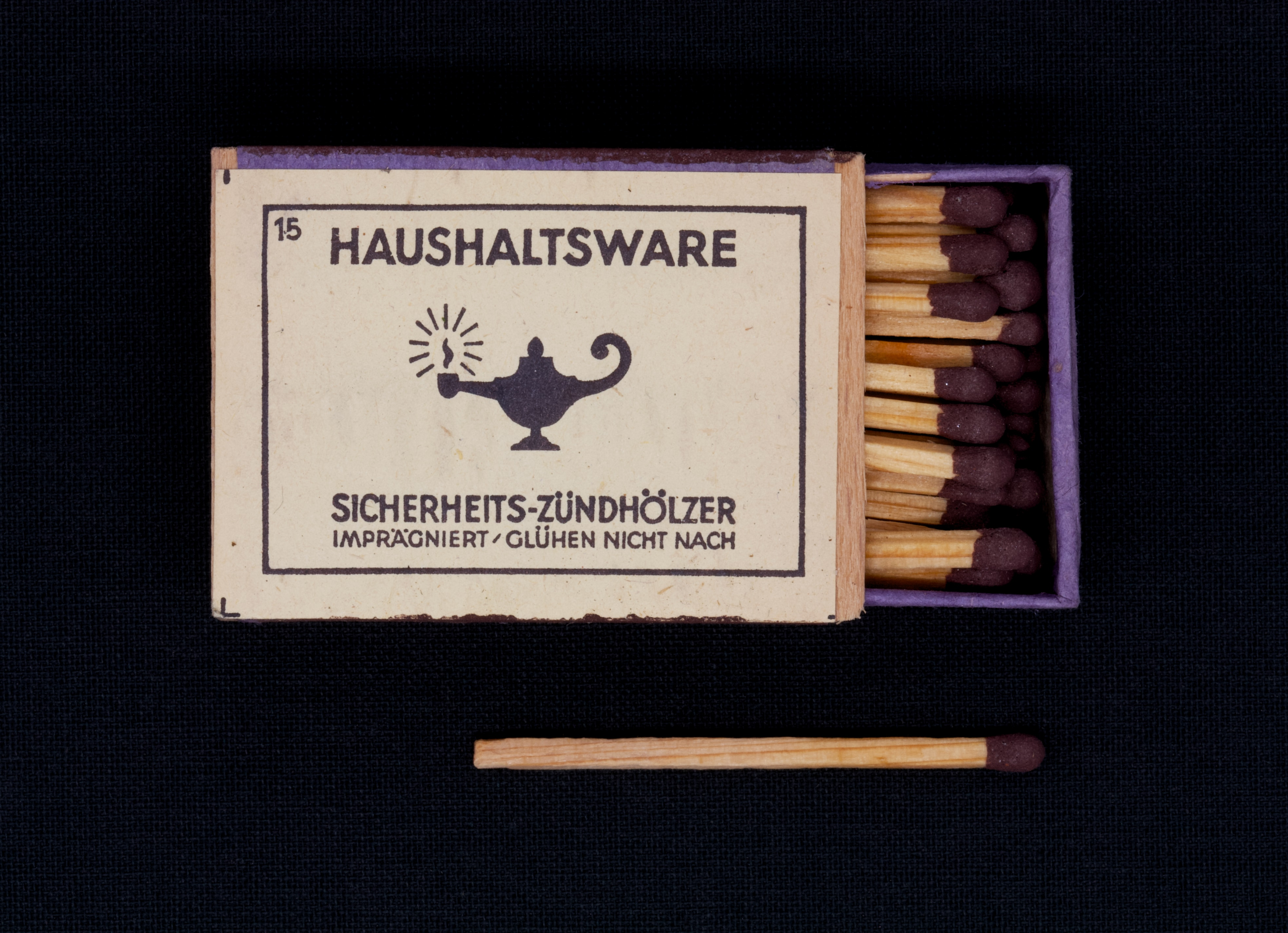
Haushaltsware 1945–1952

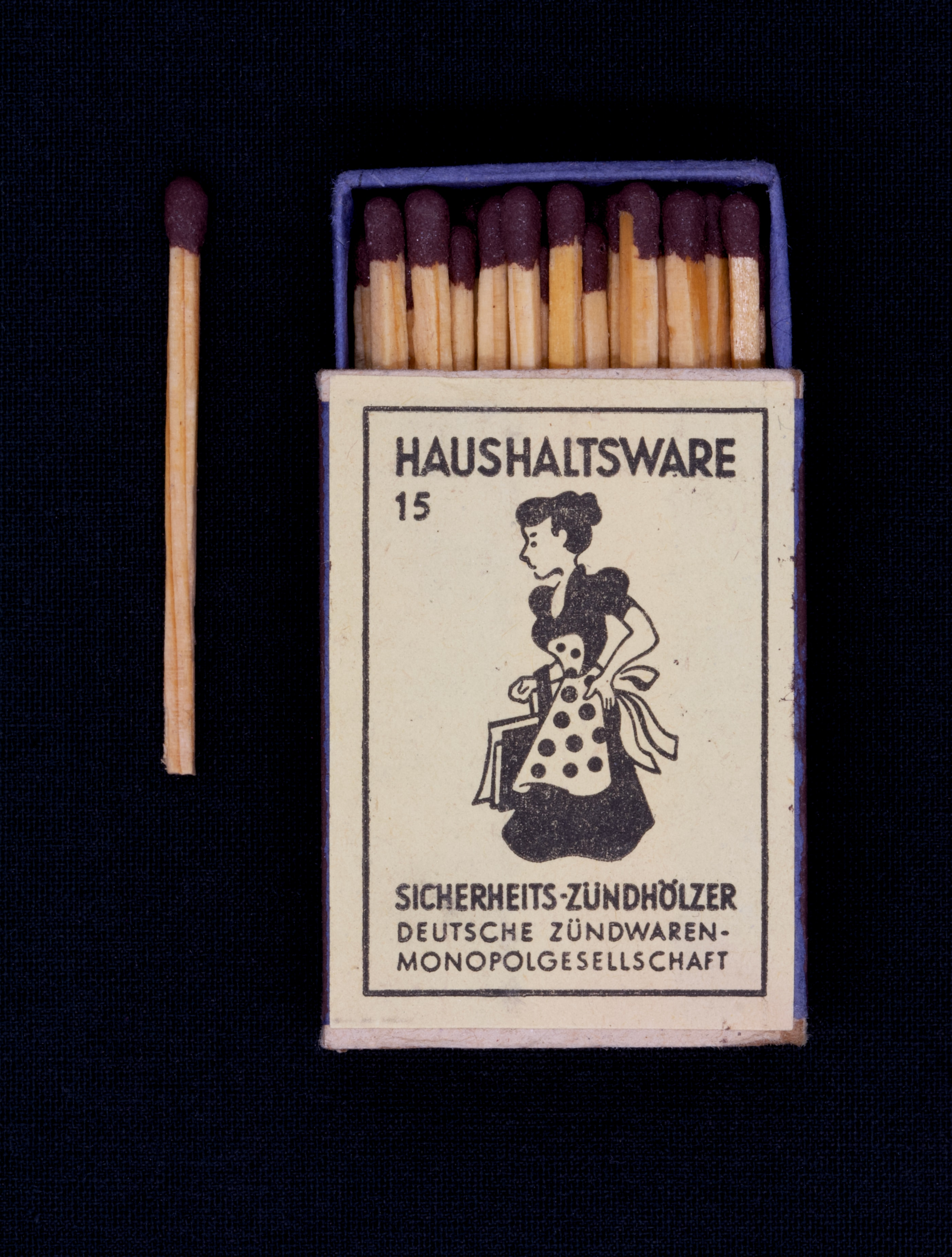
Haushaltsware 1952–1956

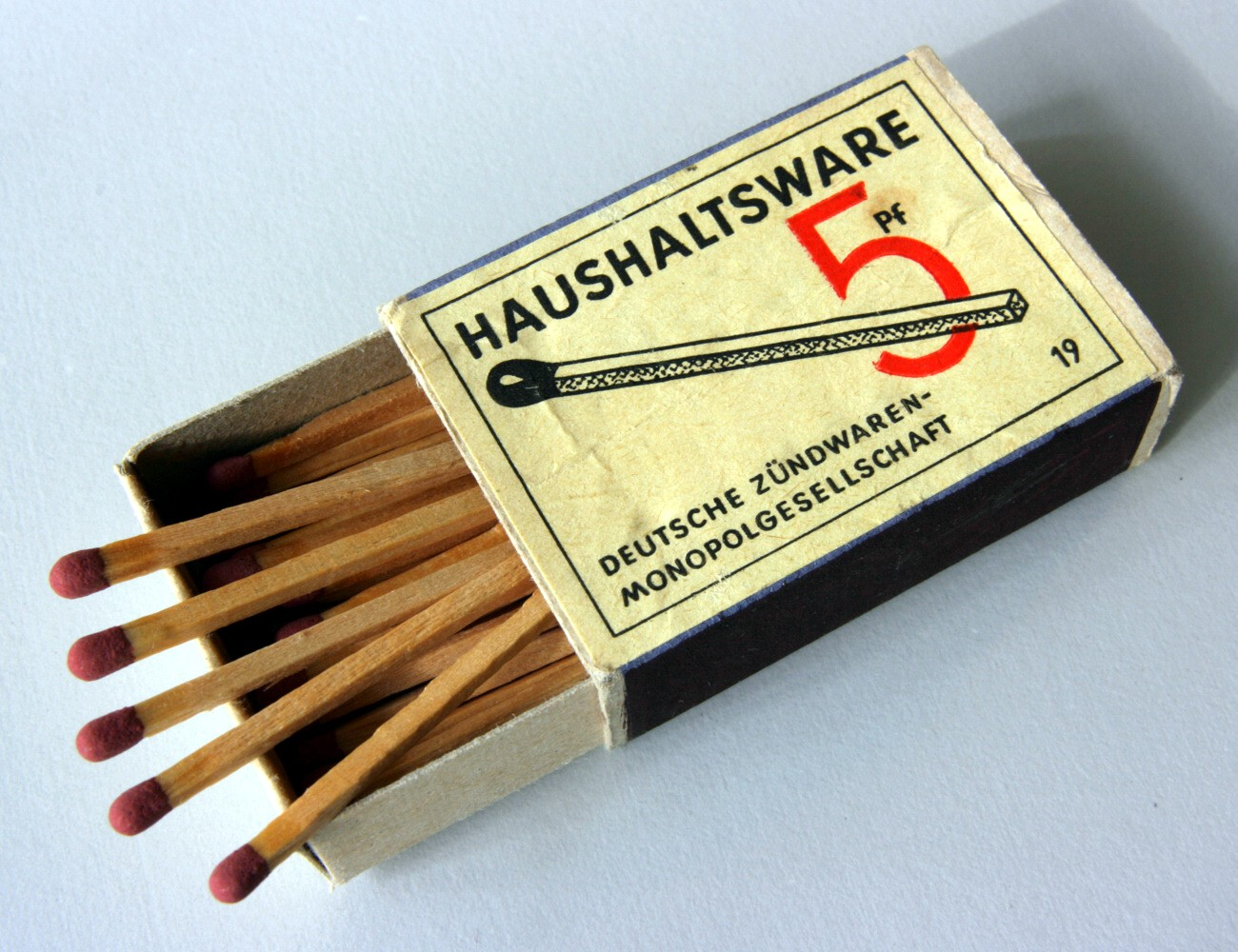
Haushaltsware 5 Pfennig since 1956

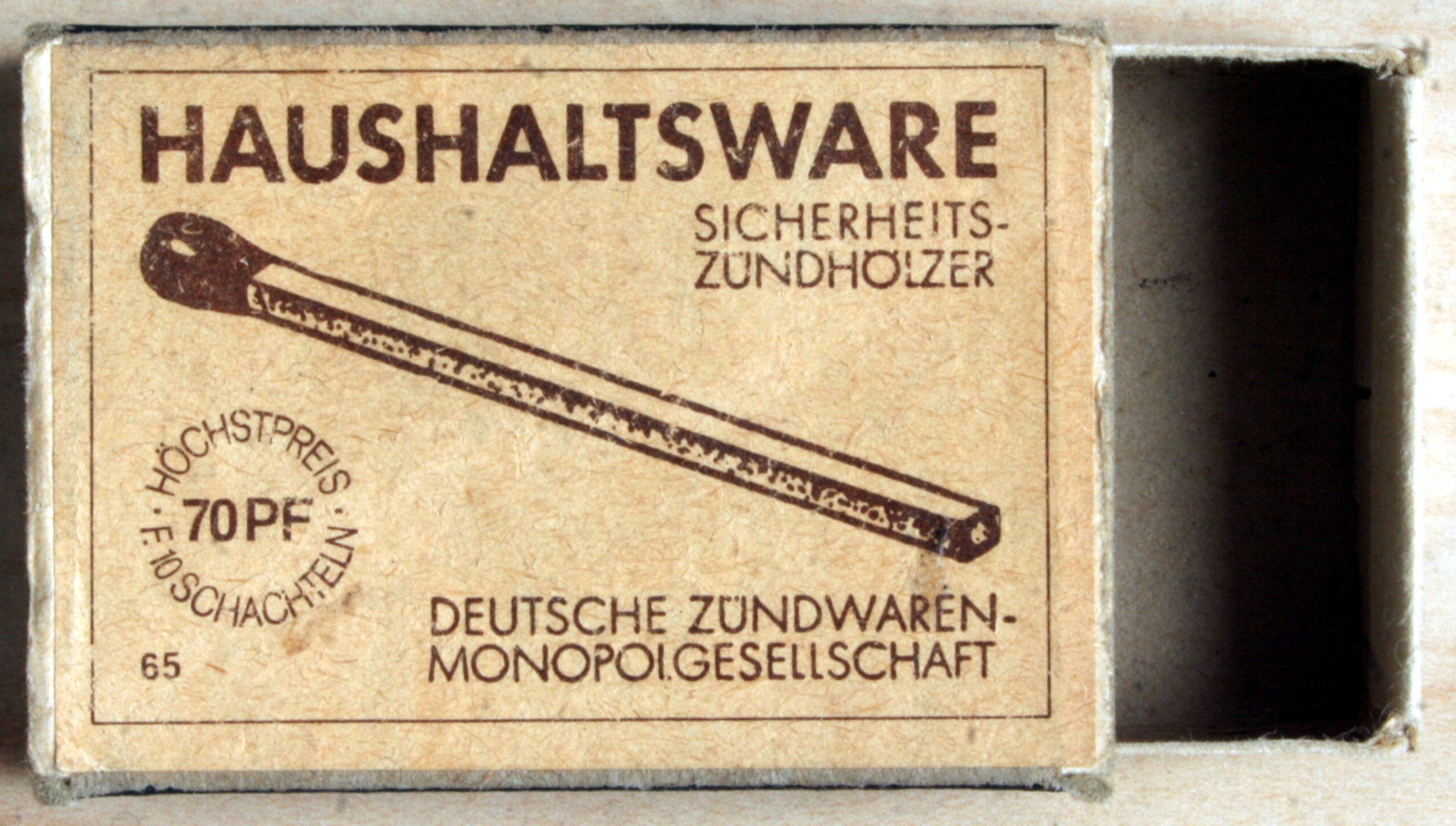
Haushaltsware 7 Pfennig until 1980

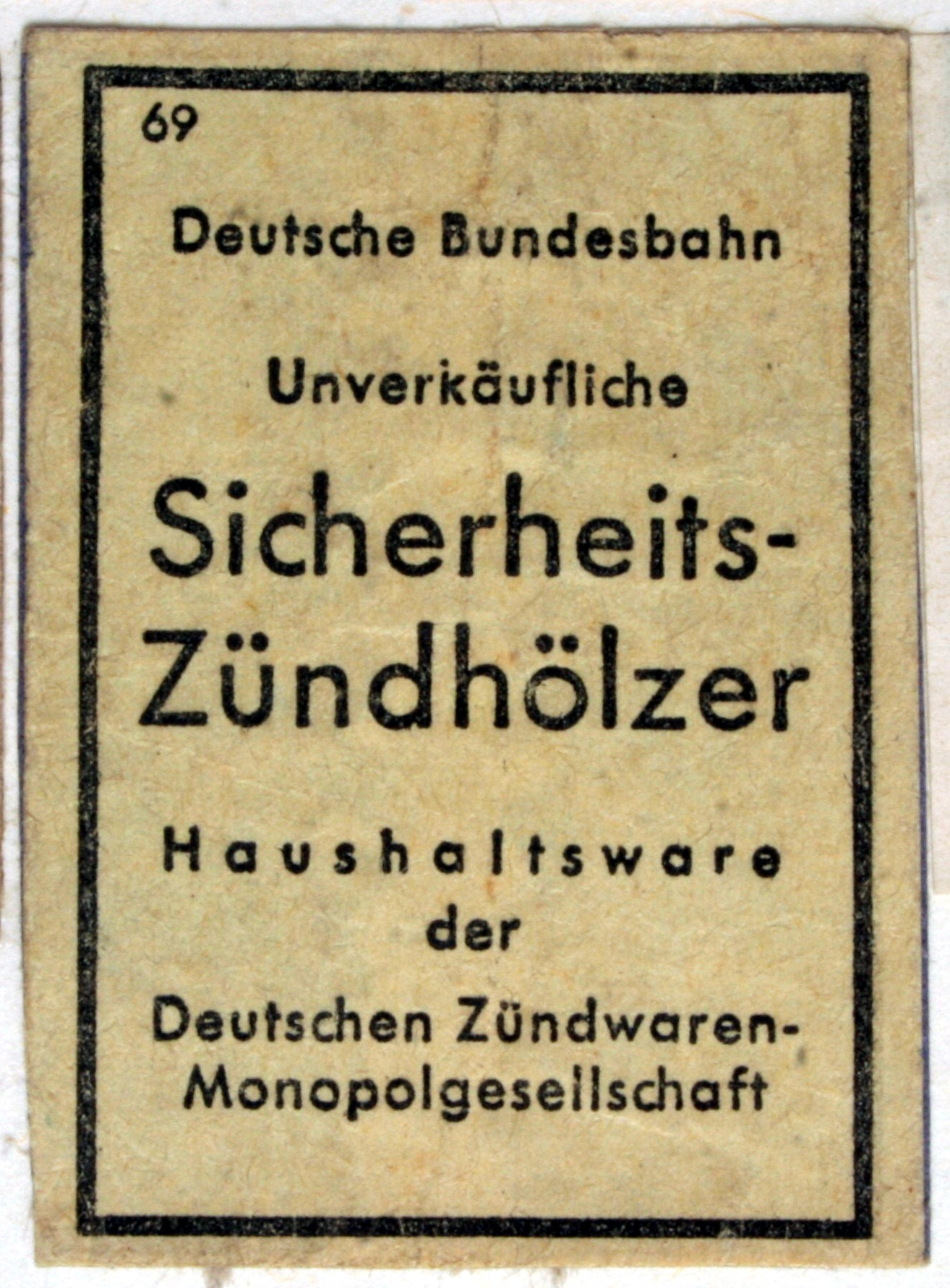
Unsellable matchbox for employees of the "Deutsche Bundesbahn" (German Federal Railway)

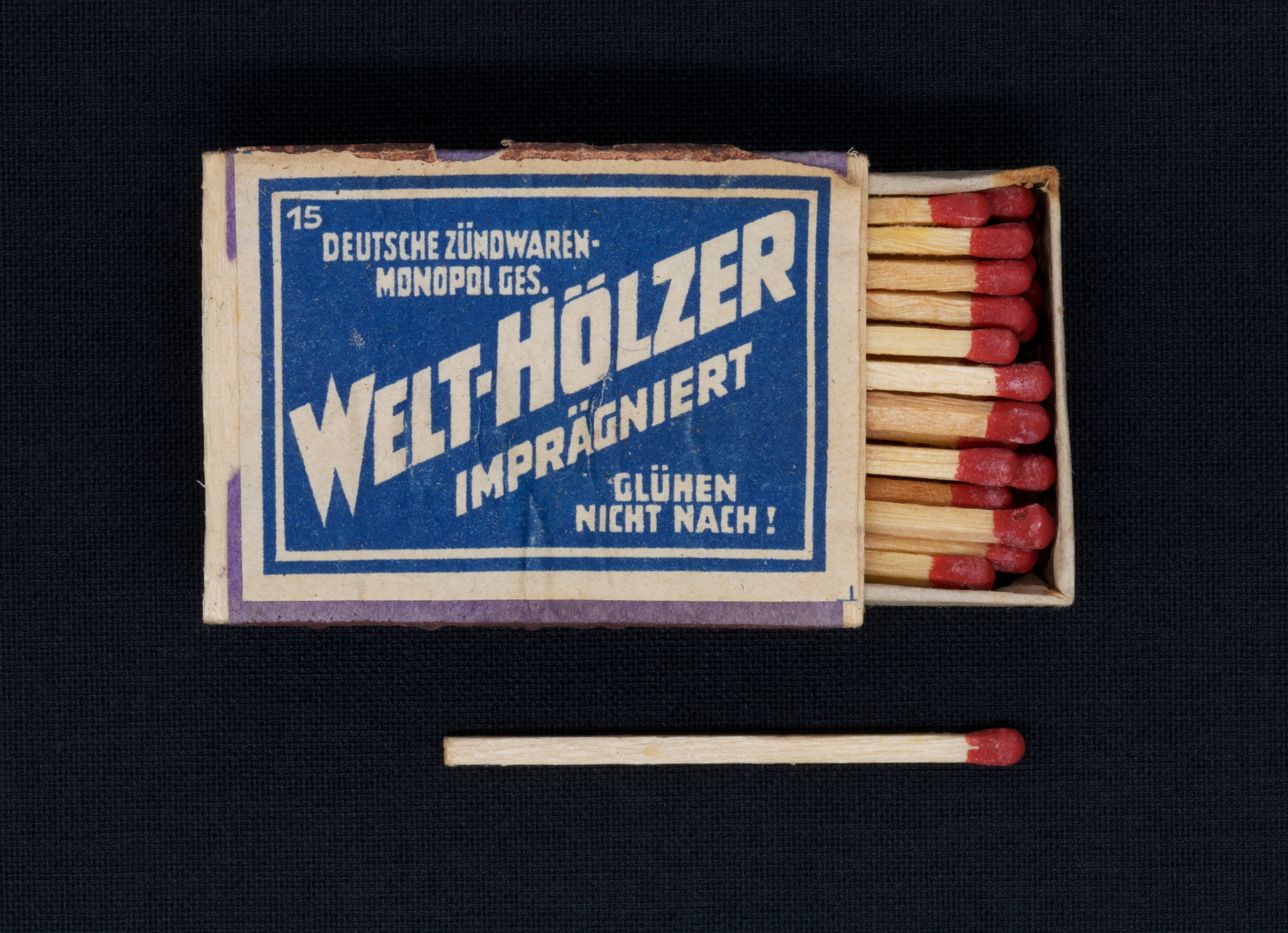
Welthölzer

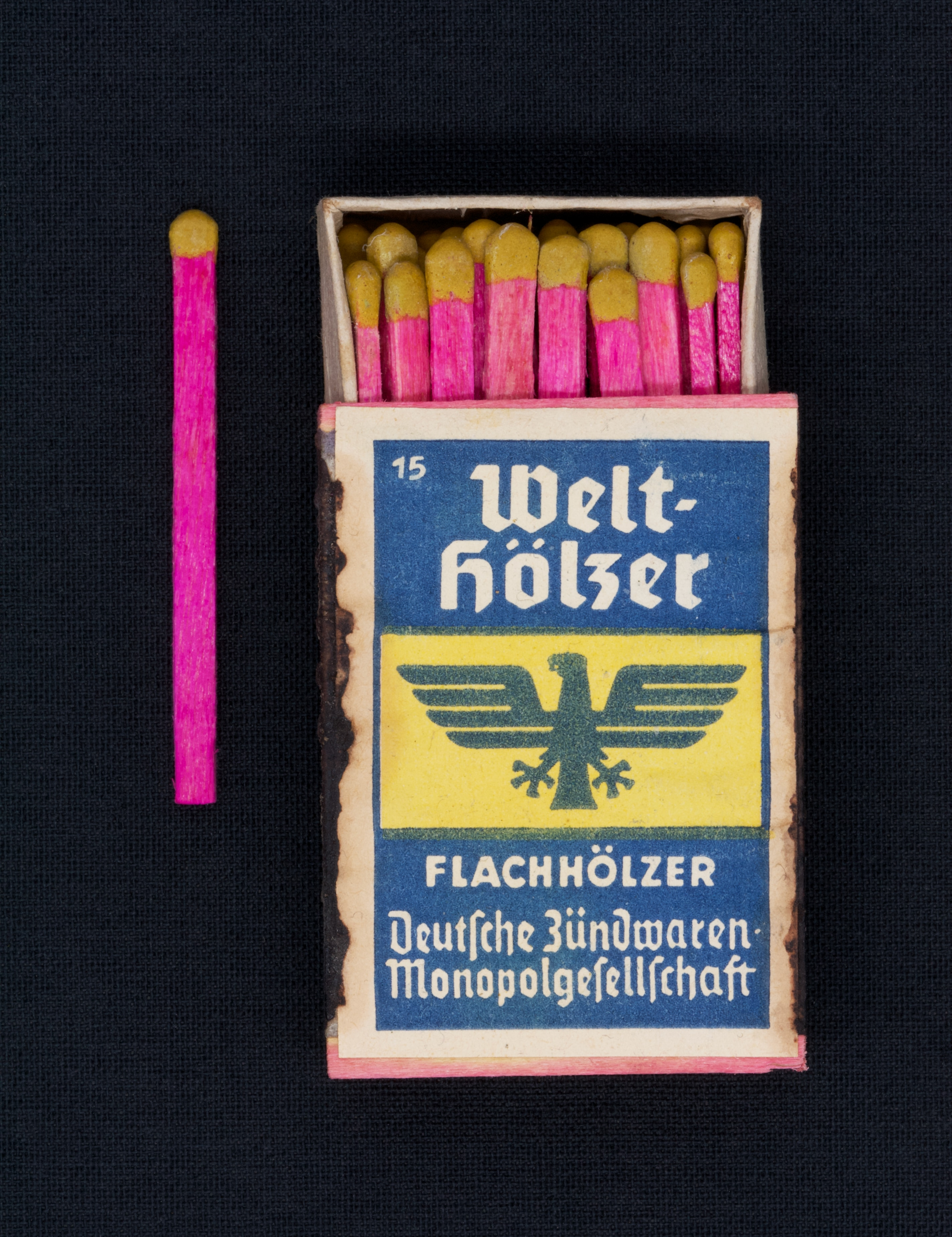
Welthölzer rectangular cross section

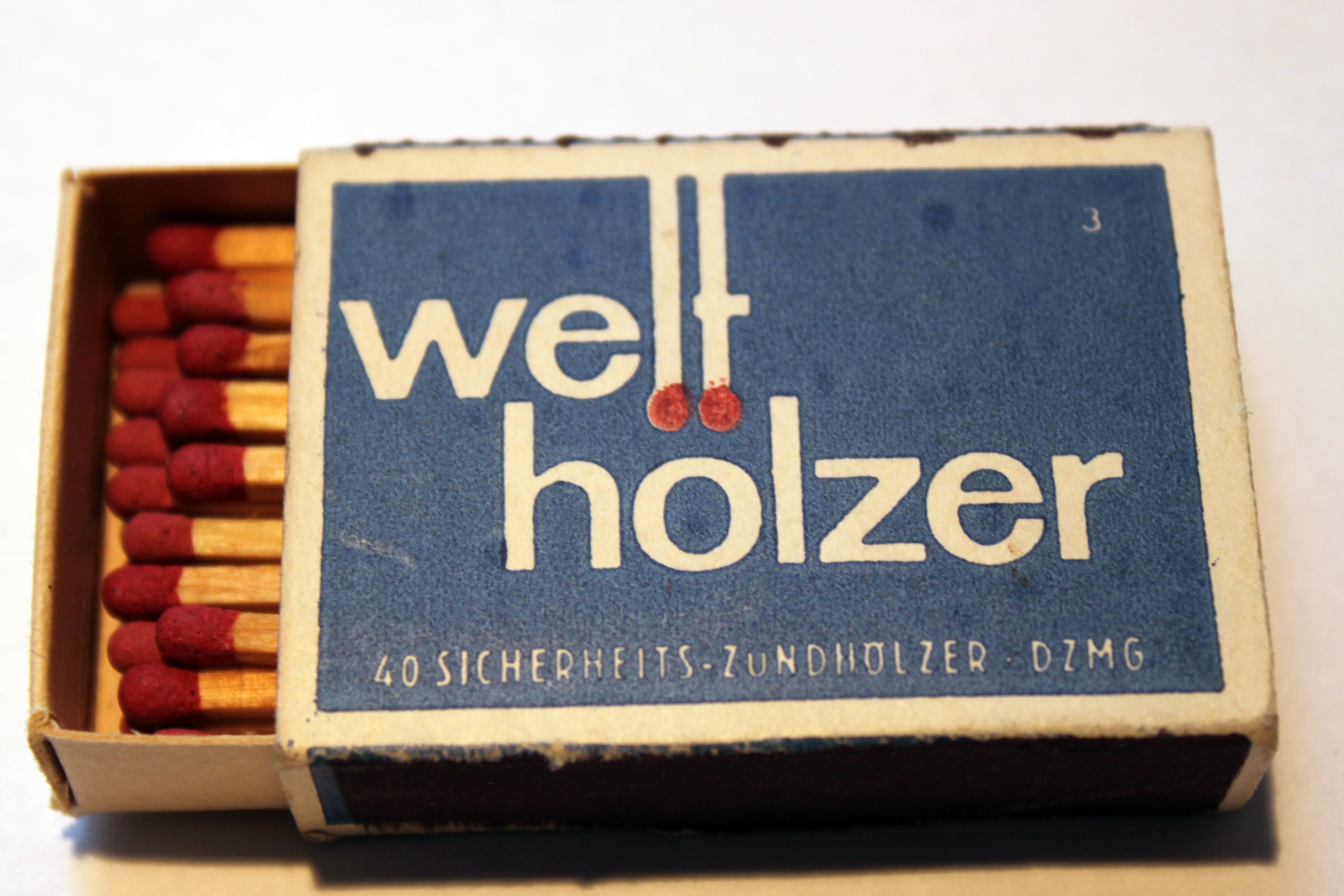
