= Erich Gritzbach =

Nazi German civil servant and SS-Oberführer (1896–1968)

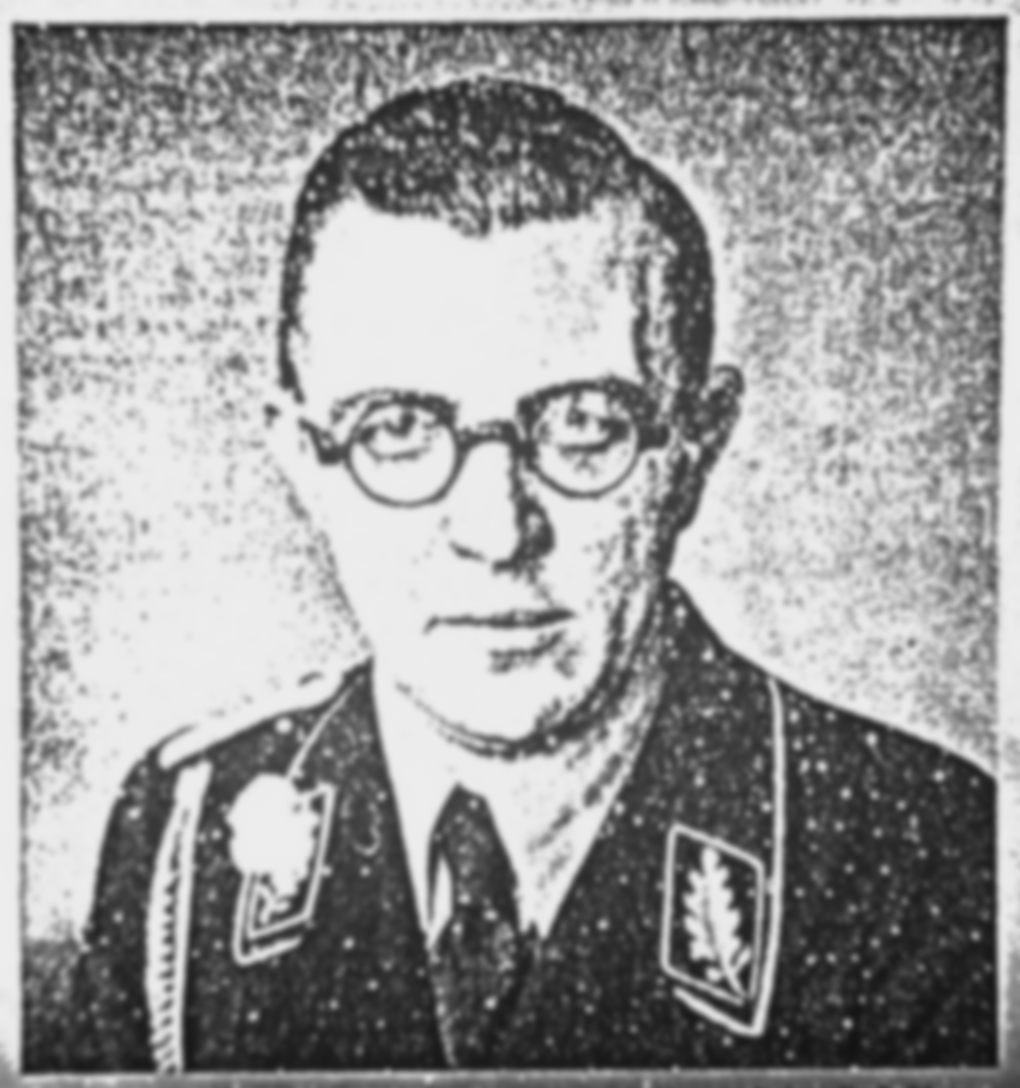
- SS-Standartenfuhrer Gritzbach (1938)

Chief of the Staff Office, Prussian State Ministry
- In office 4 March 1938 – 8 May 1945

Head of the Press Office, Prussian State Ministry
- In office 7 May 1934 – 4 March 1938

Personal details
- Born: Robert August Erich Gritzbach; 12 July 1896 Forst (Lausitz), Province of Brandenburg, Kingdom of Prussia, German Empire
- Died: 29 March 1968 (aged 71) Erlangen, Bavaria, West Germany
- Party: Nazi Party
- Other political affiliations: German National People's Party
- Education: Ph.D.
- Alma mater: University of Tübingen; Humboldt University of Berlin
- Occupation: Civil servant

Military service
- Allegiance: German Empire; Weimar Republic; Nazi Germany
- Branch/service: Imperial German Army; Reichswehr; Luftwaffe
- Years of service: 1914–1918; 1919–1920; 1935–1945
- Rank: Leutnant; Oberstleutnant
- Battles/wars: World War I World War II
- Awards: Iron Cross, 1st and 2nd class War Merit Cross, 1st and 2nd class without Swords; Wound Badge, in black

Erich Gritzbach (12 July 1896 – 29 March 1968) was a high-ranking German civil servant throughout the period of Nazi Germany. He was a protégé of Prussian Minister President Hermann Göring and served as the head of the press office and the chief of staff to the Prussian cabinet. He was also an SS-Oberführer and an officer in the Luftwaffe during the Second World War.

== Early life ==
Gritzbach was born in Forst (Lausitz) and attended the Gymnasium there. When the First World War broke out, he joined the Prussian Army on 1 August 1914, with which he served on the western front until 1918. He served with Reserve Infantry Regiment 8, was promoted to Leutnant of reserves in February 1917 and was awarded the Iron Cross 1st and 2nd class and the Wound Badge in black. After the end of the war, Gritzbach remained in the peacetime Reichswehr and volunteered for service with the Grenzschutz Ost (Eastern Border Guard). He took part in border battles in the first Silesian uprising. He served until May 1920 as a platoon and company commander of a machine gun company in both the 9th Rifle Regiment and the 93rd Rifle Regiment.

Returning to civilian life, Gritzbach worked as an assistant manager in the Association of German Machine Tool Builders from 1920 to 1922. At the same time, he studied law and political science at the Humboldt University of Berlin and the University of Tübingen. He became a member of the Berlin fraternity "Gothia" in 1921, and he earned his doctorate in political science in February 1924 from Tübingen. Gritzbach was politically active in the conservative German National People's Party (DNVP) in the early 1920s. On 17 April 1924, he joined the Reichszentrale für Heimatdienst (Reich Center for Homeland Service) an information and education authority of the Weimar Republic. There he was appointed on 1 January 1931 as a Regierungsrat (Government Counselor). On 20 July 1932, he entered the Prussian State Ministry as the adjutant to the newly-appointed Reich Commissioner for Prussia, Franz von Papen, and he was promoted to Ministerialrat (Ministerial Counselor) on 27 September 1932.

== Career in Nazi Germany ==
On 30 January 1933, upon the Nazi seizure of power, Gritzbach was appointed personal advisor to Papen when he became Vice-Chancellor of Germany in the new Hitler cabinet. Gritzbach formally joined the Nazi party on 1 April 1933 (membership number 3,473,289). On 24 April he became the personal advisor to Hermann Göring, who had become the Prussian Minister President on 11 April. On 25 September he also became the adjutant to the State Secretary of the Ministry, Paul Körner. Gritzbach additionally was named the leader of the Ministry's press office on 7 May 1934. He was made chief commissioner for the Berlin Olympic Games of 1936 in January 1936, responsible for all organizational preparations. He was promoted to Ministerialdirigent on 13 September 1936. In 1938 he was given the title of Chef des Stabsamts (Chief of the Staff Office) of the Prussian Ministry and he was promoted to Ministerialdirektor on 4 March 1938. Also on 22 August 1938, Göring appointed him to the Prussian State Council. He retained both these posts until the fall of the Nazi regime.

Gritzbach joined the (SS) on 25 September 1933 (SS member number 80,174) as an SS-Untersturmführer, rising to the rank of SS-Oberführer on 20 April 1938. From 1938 to 1945, he served on the personal staff of Reichsfuhrer SS Heinrich Himmler. Gritzbach underwent military training exercises with Luftwaffe Wing 152 in the summers of 1935 and 1936 as a Hauptmann of reserves. Just before the start of the Second World War, he was called up into the Luftwaffe in August 1939 where he attained the rank of Oberstleutnant.

== Post-war life ==
After the end of the Second World War, Gritzbach was briefly interned by American forces at Recklinghausen. He testified as a prosecution witness in June 1947 at the fifth of the subsequent Nuremberg trials, the so-called Flick Trial of leading industrialists. He subsequently was employed as an office manager in the press office of the North German Iron and Steel Control in Düsseldorf, and later worked for the European Coal and Steel Community. As a former senior civil servant, he received a pension of more than 1500 DM per month, and lived for a few years in Königsfeld im Schwarzwald. He died in Erlangen on 29 March 1968.

== Writings ==
Gritzbach wrote a biography of Göring ("Hermann Göring. Work and Man") published in 1938 that appeared in more than twenty editions and sold several hundred thousand copies, with Göring claiming the majority of the royalties for himself. It is largely hagiographic in nature.

- Pricing in German Machine Tool Construction, Ph.D. dissertation, (1924)
- Hermann Göring. Work and Man, Franz Eher Nachfolger, Munich (1938)
- Hermann Göring. Speeches and Essays, Franz Eher Nachfolger, Munich (1938)

== SS ranks ==
SS ranks
| Date | Rank |
|---|---|
| 25 September 1933 | SS-Untersturmführer |
| 4 July 1934 | SS-Obersturmführer |
| 1 January 1935 | SS-Hauptsturmführer |
| 20 April 1936 | SS-Sturmbannführer |
| 9 November 1936 | SS-Obersturmbannführer |
| 9 November 1937 | SS-Standartenführer |
| 20 April 1938 | SS-Oberführer |

== Sources ==
- Klee, Ernst (2007). Das Personenlexikon zum Dritten Reich. Wer war was vor und nach 1945. Frankfurt-am-Main: Fischer-Taschenbuch-Verlag. ISBN 978-3-596-16048-8.
- Lilla, Joachim (2005). Der Preußische Staatsrat 1921–1933: Ein biographisches Handbuch. Düsseldorf: Droste Verlag. ISBN 978-3-770-05271-4.
