= Emil Puhl =

Nazi economist and banking official

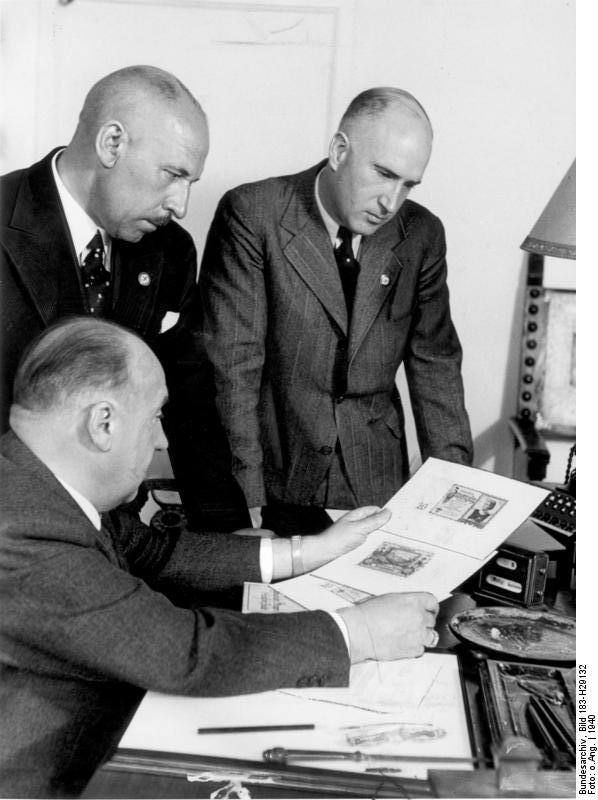
Emil Puhl (left, standing).

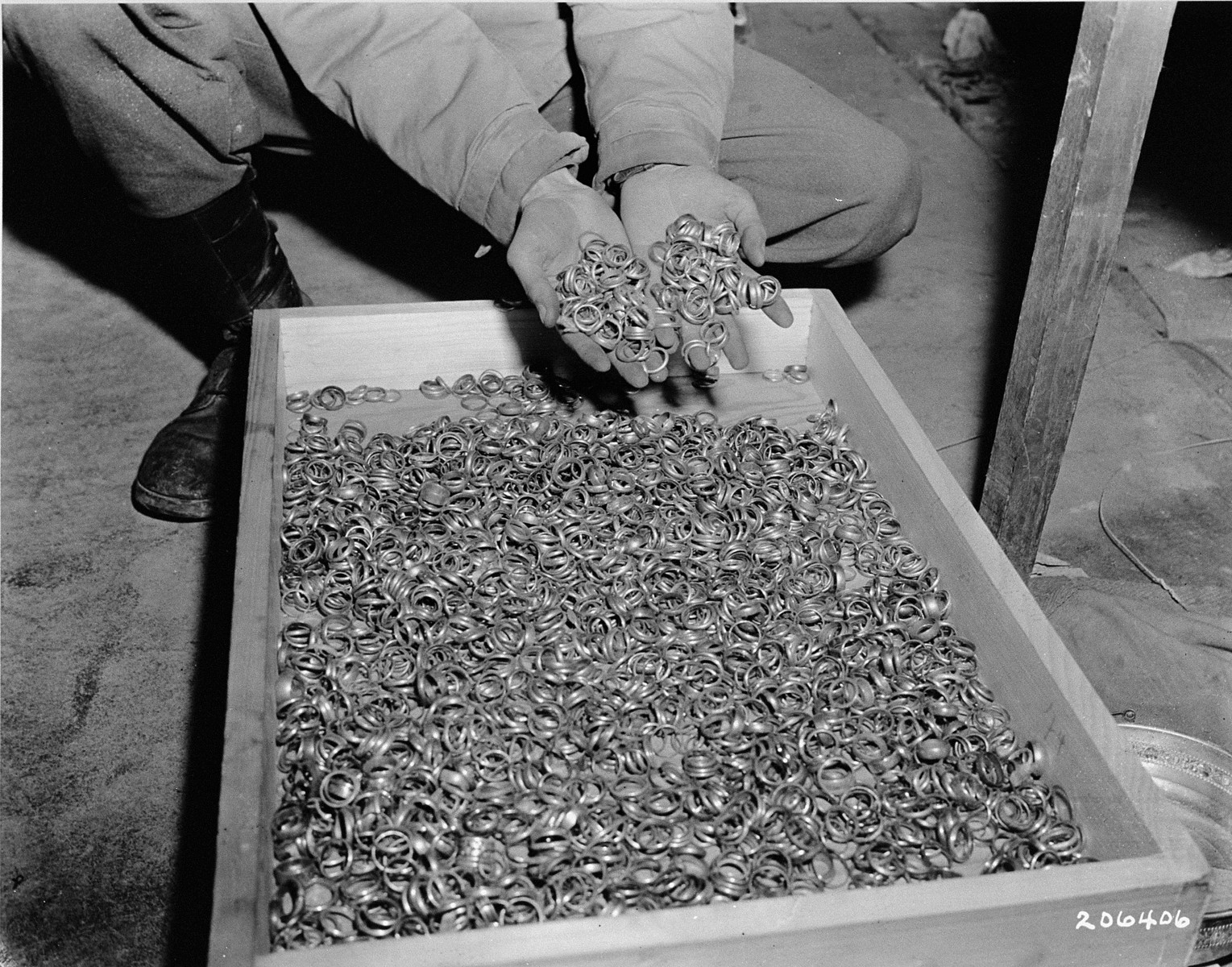
The Reichsbank banked for the SS the gold rings of Buchenwald victims to enrich the Third Reich

Emil Johann Rudolf Puhl (28 August 1889 in Berlin – 30 March 1962 in Hamburg) was a Nazi economist and banking official during World War II.

== Career ==
A Nazi, Puhl was director and vice-president of Germany's Reichsbank during World War II and also served as a director for the Bank for International Settlements (BIS) at Basel (Switzerland).

== Nazi gold ==
He was instrumental in moving Nazi gold during the war. Some of the gold had been looted from countries occupied by the Nazis, and some also stolen from their victims incarcerated in Nazi concentration camps. Much came from the victims of Operation Reinhard at Auschwitz, Majdanek, Treblinka, Bełżec, Chełmno and Sobibór where mass murder involved mainly gassing the prisoners with Zyklon B or from engine fumes, the toxic component being carbon monoxide. All their property was removed before they passed into the "showers" (which were, in fact, gas chambers, where they died). Even after death, their corpses were carefully examined for any concealed items such as gold or jewelry as well as gold teeth, which had to be removed forcibly before being passed on to the Reichsbank.

== Nuremberg Trials ==
At the Ministries Trial, one of the last of the twelve Nuremberg trials held between 6 January 1948 and 13 April 1949, he was convicted of war crimes and sentenced to five years' imprisonment. He was released from prison 21 December 1949, several months early due to good conduct.

== See also ==
- Walther Funk
- Reichsbank
- Nazi gold
- John J. McCloy
- Hermann Josef Abs
