= Deutsche Bergwerks- und Hüttenbau =

Deutsche Bergwerks- und Hüttenbau GmbH (DBH, German for German Mine Construction) was a German company specializing in construction of mines and quarries. Established under the name of Preussische Bergwerks- und Hütten-AG in late 19th century.
