= Prussian State Council (Nazi Germany) =

Advisory body in Nazi era Prussia 1933 to 1945

Prussian State Council (Nazi Germany) Preußischer Staatsrat
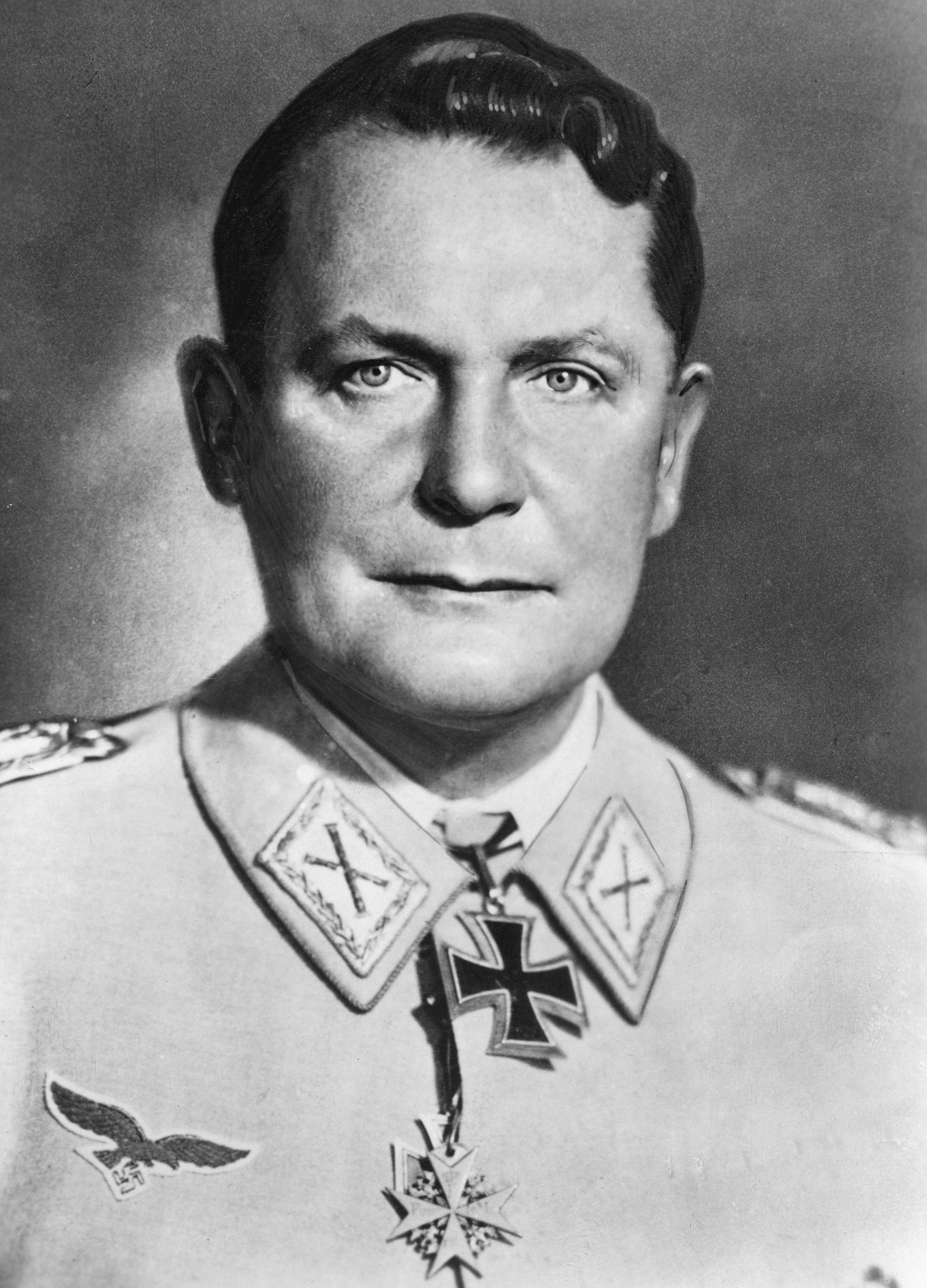
- Hermann Göring, President of the State Council

Type
- Type: Upper house

History
- Established: 8 July 1933
- Disbanded: 8 May 1945
- Preceded by: Prussian State Council (Weimar Republic)
- Succeeded by: Abolished 25 February 1947

Leadership
- President: Hermann Göring, Nazi Party

Meeting place
- New Palace, Potsdam

The Prussian State Council of Nazi Germany (German: Preußischer Staatsrat) was an advisory body to the Prussian minister president from 1933 to 1945. It was the successor to the Weimar Republic body of the same name that represented the interests of Prussia's provinces in the legislative process. In Nazi Germany its members were either appointed by Prussian minister president Hermann Göring or were members as a result of their official positions in the state of Prussia. The Council met only six times and ceased to exist with the end of Nazi rule in 1945.

== History ==
=== Background ===
During the Weimar Republic, the Prussian State Council was the second chamber of the bicameral legislature of the Free State of Prussia. Its members were elected by the Prussian provincial parliaments to represent the interests of the provinces at the state level.

With the elections to the Prussian state parliament (Landtag) that were held in parallel with the national Reichstag elections on 5 March 1933, and also with the elections to the Prussian provincial parliaments held on 12 March 1933, the Nazi Party was able to secure the necessary majority in the Landtag and in the State Council to pass a Prussian enabling act on 18 May 1933. It gave the Prussian state government the same powers at the state level that the Reich government had received at the national level through the Enabling Act of 24 March 1933. The Prussian minister president was authorized to make and implement laws without the involvement of the legislature. Through the enabling act, the State Council was deprived of its co-legislative and co-executive functions. Article 15 of the Law on the Prussian State Council of 8 July 1933 dissolved the State Council in its previous form.

=== The National Socialist State Council and its membership ===
The Law created a new body in line with the National Socialist worldview. The new State Council was a purely advisory body that by law consisted of (1) members by virtue of office (ex officio members, § 2 1.) and (2) members who were appointed by Hermann Göring in his capacity as Prussian minister president (§ 2 2.). All members were awarded the title of State Councilor (Staatsrat). Members by virtue of office were the Prussian minister president and the government ministers. Appointed members were to include the Prussian state secretaries as well as certain other office holders, among whom were the Stabschef of the SA, the Reichsführer-SS and all the Gauleiter of the Prussian Gaue. Other appointed members were to be drawn from among representatives of churches, business, labor, science, art and other "men of merit".

Members had to be males at least 25 years old with German citizenship and a residence in Prussia. For those who were members by virtue of office, membership ended by leaving office. Appointed members' terms were ended by death, resignation, or dismissal by Göring. Members of the State Council received an expense allowance of 1,000 Reichsmarks per month (from 1 April 1936, ℛℳ 500).

In his extensive biographical study of the members of the Prussian State Councils, German historian Joachim Lilla listed 122 known members of the State Council of Nazi Germany. This included 11 ministers, 19 state secretaries and 92 other appointed members. Of the total membership, 78 joined the State Council in 1933, with the first appointments taking place on 11 July. Another 40 individuals were added between 1934 and 1939, with only 4 additions being made after that year, the last in August 1943. Over the years, the membership fluctuated as a result of deaths, departures from office, resignations and dismissals (including that of Göring himself on 23 April 1945). A total of 31 members died in office (including 4 that were executed during the Night of the Long Knives and 7 suicides in the closing days of the Second World War). There were approximately 60 individuals still technically in office as Prussian State Councillors following the surrender of Nazi Germany on 8 May 1945.

=== Meetings ===
Only six meetings of the State Council were held. It met for the first time on 15 September 1933 for a ceremonial opening in the auditorium of the Friedrich Wilhelms University in Berlin, before reconvening for a working session the next day at the New Palace, Potsdam where all subsequent meetings would be held. The second meeting was held on 12 October 1933 and the third on 18 June 1934, with a report by the minister of finance on Prussia's financial situation. The fourth session was convened on 21 March 1935, the second anniversary of Potsdam Day commemorating the reopening of the Reichstag building following the fire of February 1933, and the fifth was on 25 June 1935. The last session was held on 5 March 1936.

=== End of the State Council ===
After the March 1936 session, the State Council was no longer convened, although it continued to exist. In August 1943, Albert Hoffmann was the last member appointed. With the fall of the National Socialist state in May 1945, the State Council also effectively came to an end. On 25 February 1947, the Allied Control Council promulgated Control Council Law No. 46, which stated: "The Prussian State together with its central government and all its agencies is abolished." This formally put an end to the State Council.

== Text of the law establishing the State Council ==
Gesetz über den Preußischen Staatsrat. Vom 8. Juli 1933.
Law on the Prussian State Council of 8 July 1933
§ 1 Der Staatsrat berät das Staatsministerium bei der Führung der Staatsgeschäfte.
§ 1 The State Council shall advise the State Ministry on the conduct of state affairs.
§ 2 Den Staatsrat bilden:

1. kraft ihres Amtes der Ministerpräsident und die Staatsminister;

2. kraft Ernennung durch den Ministerpräsidenten bis zu 50 Personen.

§ 2 The State Council shall consist of:

1. by virtue of their office, the Minister President and the State Ministers;

2. by appointment by the Minister President, up to 50 persons.

§ 3 Die Mitglieder des Staatsrats führen die Amtsbezeichnung: Preußischer Staatsrat.
§ 3 The members of the State Council shall have the official title: Prussian State Councilor.
§ 4 (1) Zum Staatsrat kann nur ernannt werden, wer mindestens 25 Jahre alt ist und die Rechte eines deutschen Staatsbürgers besitzt. Er muß in einer der preußischen Provinzen seinen Wohnsitz haben. Nicht zum Staatsrat können ernannt werden: Reichsminister, unbeschadet ihrer Mitgliedschaft als preußischer Staatsminister, Reichsstatthalter, Mitglieder einer außerpreußischen Landesregierung sowie Beamte des Reichs oder eines auBerpreußischen Landes.

(2) Ausnahmen von den Vorschriften des Abs. 1, Satz 2 und 3 sind nur zulässig, soweit sie sich aus § 5 ergeben.

§ 4 (1) Only a person who is at least 25 years of age and has the rights of a German citizen may be appointed to the State Council. He must have his residence in one of the Prussian provinces. The following may not be appointed to the State Council: Reich Ministers, irrespective of their positions as Prussian State Ministers, Reich Governors, members of a non-Prussian state government, and officials of the Reich or of a non-Prussian state.

(2) Exceptions to the provisions of subsection 1, sentences 2 and 3 shall be permitted only insofar as they result from § 5.

§ 5 Der Ministerpräsident ernennt die Staatsräte aus folgenden Gruppen:

1. Gruppe: Staatasekretäre

2. Gruppe: Der Stabschef der gesamten SA, der Reichsführer der SS, der Stabsleiter der PO, die für preußische Gebietsteile zuständigen Gauleiter der NSDAP, und die eine Gruppe führenden Obergruppenführer der SA und Gruppenführer der SS. Der Ernennung des Stabschefs der gesamten SA und des Reichsführers der SS stehen die Vorschriften des § 4 Satz 2 und 3 nicht entgegen. Treffen diese Vorschriften für die Gauleiter der NSDAP, die Obergruppenführer der SA und die Gruppenführer der SS nicht zu, so kann der Ministerpräsident an ihrer Stelle einen anderen nationalsozialistischen Amtswalter oder einen anderen SA- oder SS- Führer berufen.

3. Gruppe: Vertreter der Kirchen, von Wirtschaft, Arbeit, Wissenschaft und Kunst sowie sonstige um Staat und Volk verdiente Männer.

§ 5 The Minister President shall appoint the State Councilors from the following groups:

Group 1: State Secretaries

Group 2: The Chief of Staff of the entire SA, the Reichsführer of the SS, the Chief of Staff of the PO (Note: Politische Organisation (Political Organisation)), the Gauleiters of the NSDAP responsible for Prussian administrative regions, and the Obergruppenführer of the SA and Gruppenführer of the SS leading a group. The appointment of the Chief of Staff of the entire SA and the Reich Leader of the SS shall not be precluded by the provisions of § 4, sentences 2 and 3. If these provisions do not apply to the Gauleiter of the NSDAP, the Obergruppenführer of the SA and the Gruppenführer of the SS, the Minister President may appoint another National Socialist official or another SA or SS leader in their place.

Group 3: representatives of churches, business, labor, science and art, and other men of merit to the state and the people.

§ 6 (1) Der Ministerpräsident, die Staatsminister und die Staatssekretäre gehören dem Staatsrate für die Dauer ihres Amtes an, die Staatsräte der 2. Gruppe des § 5 für die Dauer der dort bezeichneten Ämter in der nationalsozialistischen Bewegung, die Staatsräte der 3. Gruppe des § 5 auf Lebenszeit.

(2) Die Zugehörigkeit der Staatsräte der 3. Gruppe des § 5 zum Staatsrat erlischt, wenn der Ministerpräsident feststellt, daß die Voraussetzungen nicht mehr vorliegen, auf Grund deren die Ernennung erfolgt ist.

(3) Die Mitgliedschaft erlischt ferner, wenn der Ministerpräsident einem Staatsrate das Anerkenntnis unverletzter Ehrenhaftigkeit oder eines der Würde des Staatsrats entsprechenden Lebenswandels oder Verhaltens versagt.

§ 6 (1) The Minister President, the State Ministers and the State Secretaries shall belong to the State Council for the duration of their office, the State Councilors of the second group of § 5 for the duration of the offices in the National Socialist movement designated therein, the State Councilors of the third group of § 5 for life.

(2) The membership of the State Councilors of the third group of § 5 in the State Council shall cease when the Minister President determines that the conditions on the basis of which the appointment was made no longer exist.

(3) Membership shall also cease if the Minister President finds a State Councilor's unimpaired sense of honor or moral conduct befitting the dignity of the State Council lacking.

§ 7 (1) Präsident des Staatsrats ist der Ministerpräsident. Er kann mit der Leitung einer Sitzung einen Staatsminister beauftragen.

(2) Der Ministerpräsident ernennt aus der Zahl der Staatsräte einen Schriftführer, der zugleich die geschäftlichen Angelegenheiten des Staatsrats verwaltet. Die Verwaltungsgeschäfte des Staatsrats führt die Geschäftsstelle des Staatsministeriums.

(3) Der Ministerpräsident gibt dem Staatsrat eine Geschäftsordnung.

§ 7 (1) The Minister President shall be the President of the State Council. He may entrust a State Minister with the chairmanship of a meeting.

(2) The Minister President shall appoint a secretary from among the number of State Councilors, who shall also manage the business affairs of the State Council. The administrative business of the State Council shall be conducted by the office of the State Ministry.

(3) The Minister President shall issue rules of procedure for the State Council.

§ 8 (1) Der Staatsrat versammelt sich, wenn er vom Ministerpräsidenten einberufen wird. Der Ministerpräsident setzt die Tagesordnung für die Sitzungen fest.

(2) Der Ministerpräsident oder der ihn im Vorsitz vertretende Staatsminister eröffnet die Sitzungen des Staatsrats; er kann sie jederzeit ohne Rücksicht auf den Stand der Beratungen schließen.

§ 8 (1) The State Council shall meet when convened by the Minister President. The Minister President shall set the agenda for the meetings.

(2) The Minister President or the State Minister representing him in the chair shall open the meetings of the State Council; he may close them at any time regardless of the progress of the discussions.

§ 9 Die Staatsräte sind verpflichtet, an allen Sitzungen teilzunehmen, soweit sie nicht vom Ministerpräsidenten beurlaubt sind.
§ 9 The State Councilors are obligated to attend all meetings unless they are granted leave by the Minister President.
§ 10 (1) Die Staatsräte äußern sich zu den Vorlagen, die dem Staatsrate zugehen. Wichtige Gesetze sollen vor ihrer Verkündung dem Staatsräte vorgelegt werden. Hält ein Staatsrat die Beratung einer sonstigen Angelegenheit für erwünscht, so teilt er dies dem Ministerpräsidenten unter Darlegung der Gründe mit; der Ministerpräsident entscheidet endgültig, ob der Anregung zu entsprechen ist.

(2) Der Staatsrat stimmt nicht ab.

§10 (1) The State Councils shall give their opinion on the bills that come before the State Council. Important laws shall be submitted to the State Council before their promulgation. If a State Councilor considers it desirable to discuss any other matter, he shall inform the Minister President thereof, stating the reasons; the Minister President shall make the final decision as to whether the suggestion is conforming.

(2) The State Councilor shall not vote.

§ 11 Die Sitzungen des Staatsrats sind nicht öffentlich.
§ 11 The meetings of the State Council are not to be public.
§ 12 Der Reichskanzler kann jederzeit die Einberufung des Staatsrats verlangen; er kann im Staatsrat jederzeit erscheinen und das Wort nehmen.
§ 12 The Reich Chancellor may demand that the State Council be convened at any time; he may appear in the State Council at any time and take the floor.
§ 13 Beamte, Angestellte und Arbeiter des Staates, der preußischen Gemeinden und Gemeindeverbände und der sonstigen preußischen Körperschaften des öffentlichen Rechtes bedürfen zur Ausübung des Amtes als Staatsräte keines Urlaubs; Gehälter und Löhne sind weiter zu zahlen.
§ 13 Civil servants, employees and workers of the State, the Prussian municipalities and associations of municipalities and the other Prussian corporate bodies under public law shall not be required to take leave in order to exercise their office as State Councilors; salaries and wages shall continue to be paid.
§ 14 Das Amt der Staatsräte ist ein Ehrenamt. Die Staatsräte erhalten freie Eisenbahnfahrt und Aufwandsentschädigung nach Maßgabe von Vorschriften, die das Staatsministerium erläßt. Ein Verzicht auf die Aufwandsentschädigung ist nicht statthaft.
§ 14 The office of State Councilor is an honorary office. The State Councilors shall receive free rail travel and reimbursement of expenses in accordance with regulations issued by the State Ministry. The reimbursement of expenses may not be waived.
§ 15 (1) Dieses Gesetz tritt mit dem auf die Verkündung folgenden Tage in Kraft. Mit dem Inkrafttreten ist der bisherige Staatsrat aufgelöst. Der Präsident des bisherigen Staatsrats überführt seine Geschäfte spätestens bis zum ersten Zusammentritt des neuen Staatsrats auf die Geschäftsstelle des Staatsministeriums.

(2) Der vierte Abschnitt der preußischen Verfassung 1) und das Gesetz über die Wahlen zum Staatsrat vom 16. Dezember 1920 (Gesetzsamml. 1921, S. 90) treten außer Kraft.

§ 15 (Note: Article 15 does not appear in the Preußische Gesetzsammlung cited as the source for the remaining articles. § 15 is taken here from the source in the reference that follows this note. It contains the sub-heading "With the amendments due to the law of 31 July 1931" – which has proven too vague to identify – and differs from the Preußische Gesetzsammlung in Articles 5 and 6.) (1) This act shall enter into force on the day following its promulgation. The previous State Council shall be dissolved upon entry into force. The President of the previous State Council shall transfer its business to the office of the State Ministry at the latest by the first meeting of the new State Council.

(2) The fourth section of the Prussian Constitution 1) (Note: Section IV defines the State Council. Its first article states: "A State Council shall be formed to represent the provinces in the legislation and administration of the State.") and the Act on the Elections to the State Council of 16 December 1920 (Law Collection 1921, p. 90) shall cease to have effect. (Note: The law established the rules for the first election to the Prussian State Council during the Weimar Republic. The footnote following has the German language text.)

== See also ==
- List of Members of the Prussian State Council of Nazi Germany
