= Naumburg Cathedral and the High Medieval Cultural Landscape of the Rivers Saale and Unstrut =

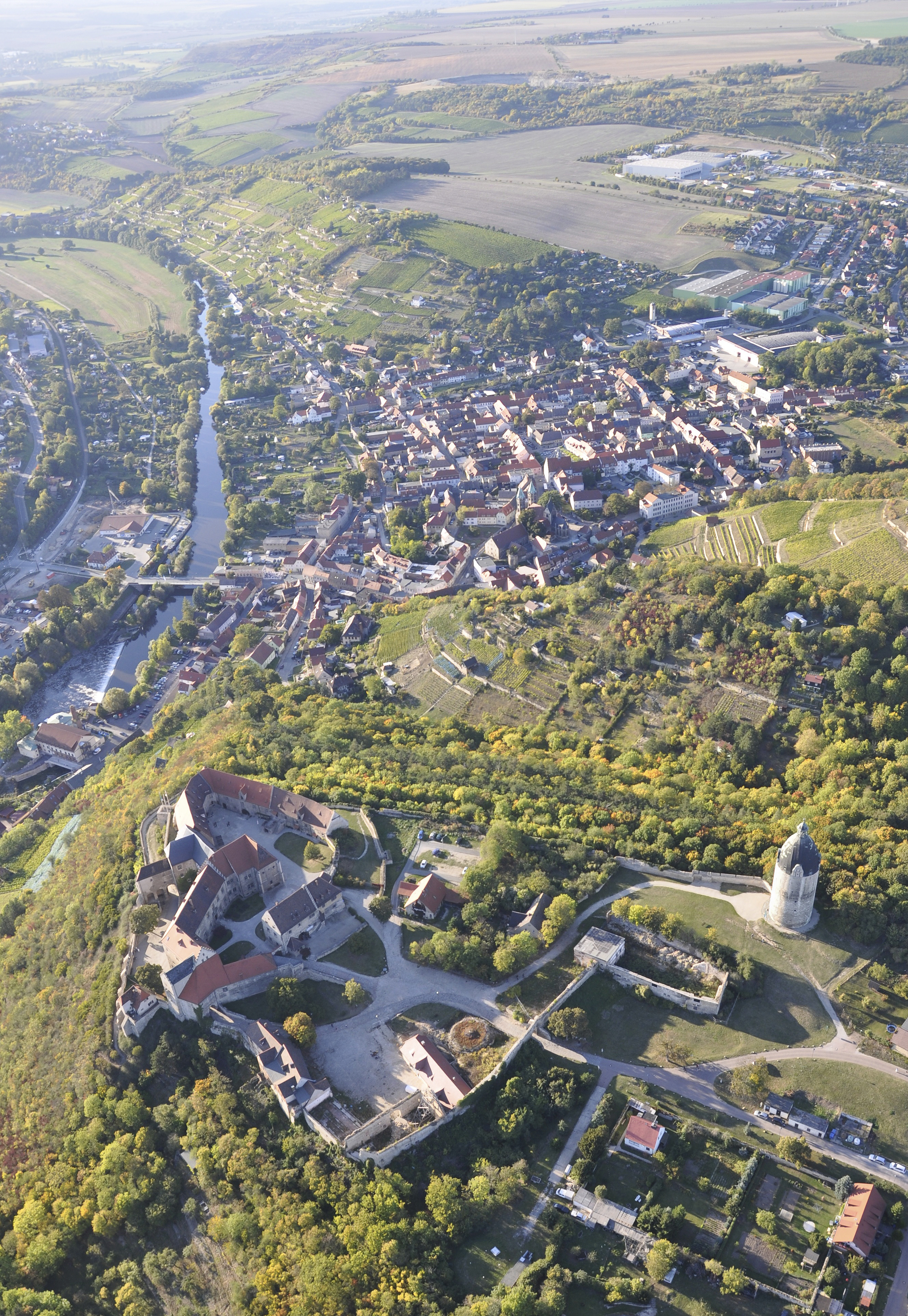
- The cultural landscape around Naumburg Cathedral

- Location within Germany

General information
- Type: Cultural Landscape
- Location: Saxony-Anhalt, Germany
- Coordinates: 51°9′17″N 11°48′14″E

Website
- naumburg-cathedral.de

The Naumburg Cathedral and the High Medieval Cultural Landscape of the Rivers Saale and Unstrut is situated in the state of Saxony-Anhalt, Germany. Naumburg Cathedral and the surrounding cultural landscape were proposed by Germany as a World Heritage Site. On July 1, 2018, only Naumburg Cathedral was designated by UNESCO as a World Heritage Site. This article discusses the cathedral and its cultural landscape based on the submissions in 1998 (cathedral) and 2005 (cultural landscape).

The cathedral and surrounding cultural landscape is representative for processes at the High Middle Ages that shaped the whole continent: Christianization, settlement and cultivation processes, the so-called Landesausbau, that took place between 1000 and 1300. This borderland region also bears witness of the intercultural exchange of different cultures in the High Middle Ages. The highest-ranking buildings and works of art, most of all Naumburg Cathedral with its globally unique artistic and iconographic founder figures, provides testimony to the claims to power and the self-confidence of the worldly and spiritual rulers as well as to the region's crucial role as a place of interchange between Western and Eastern realms.

== Nomination as World Heritage Site ==
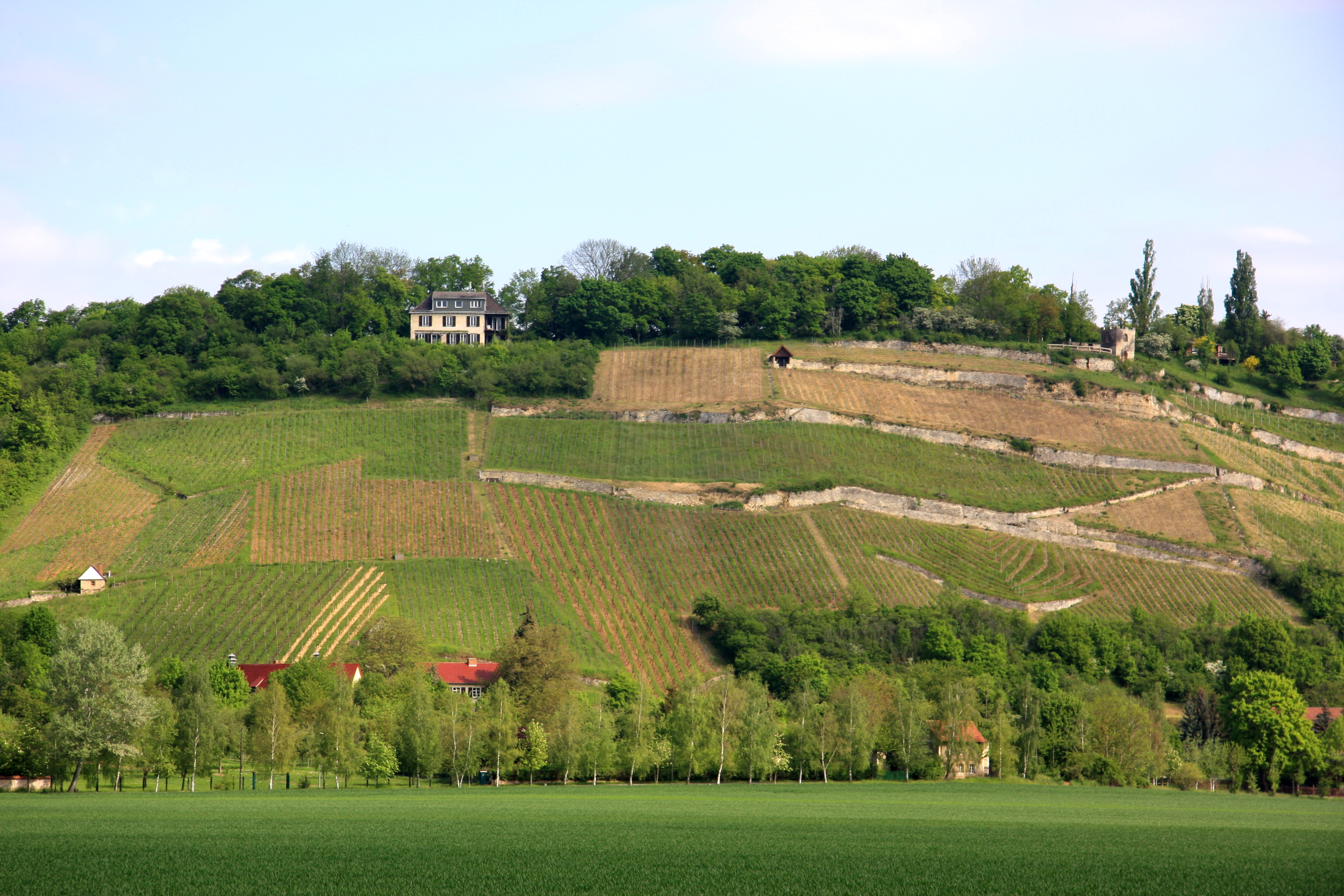
Steinmeister vineyard

In 1998, Naumburg Cathedral was inscribed into the Tentative List for World Heritage nominations and extended seven years later by its surrounding cultural landscape. (Note: Tentative Lists are prepared by States Parties to the Convention on the Protection of Cultural and Natural World Heritage. They contain a number of nomination proposals to be submitted in the future. For further information on the selection of potential World Heritage sites, please see selection criteria.) "The 'Naumburg Cathedral and the surrounding cultural landscape along the rivers Saale and Unstrut' are outstanding and representative examples of the High Middle Ages (1000–1300). Nowhere else in the world has such a high density of monuments and cultural landscape elements from the High Middle Ages been preserved in such a small space in such a level of authenticity in its original spatial setting.".
In 2008, the Förderverein Welterbe an Saale und Unstrut e.V. was founded as the Sponsoring Association of the World Heritage Site by the Saale and Unstrut.
The nomination was discussed on the 39th meeting of World Heritage Committee. The World Heritage Committee decided to defer the nomination in order to allow for a revision and renewed submission taking into account the recommendations of the ICOMOS-evaluation and seeking the guidance and advice by ICOMOS in the process.
On 1 February 2016, Germany submitted a renewed submission to the World Heritage Centre in Paris, UNESCO. This nomination was discussed at the 41st meeting of the World Heritage Committee in Kraków, Poland, from 2 until 12 July 2017 where the Committee decided upon the Outstanding Universal Value of the Naumburg Cathedral. Germany submitted the revised nomination "Naumburg Cathedral" on 1 February 2018. However, only Naumburg Cathedral was listed as a UNESCO World Heritage Site on July 1, 2018. The German officials were indifferent about the decision of excluding the surrounding landscape.

=== Cultural landscape ===
The cultural landscape around the Naumburg Cathedral is a cultural landscape that illustrates the "evolution of human society and settlement over time". This landscape was created intentionally by man.

The Naumburg Cathedral and the High Medieval Cultural Landscape of the Rivers Saale and Unstrut displays the rise of the Central Middle Ages in Europe. This was a time of rise, a "take off" due to an increase in population, Christianization and major transformation in agriculture. The "Landesausbau", urban development, internal colonization and territorialisation, took place all across Europe. "Never again has Europe seen such cultural and institutional uniformity as at that time".
The nominated area serves as an extraordinary model region due to the density and quality of elements displaying mediaeval land development and land exploitation. It was a melting pot of populations of different origins, Frankish, Thuringian, Saxon, Flemish, and Slavonic. Furthermore, as a sensitive border region, it was shaped by ecclesiastical and secular powers seeking the rights of possession, representation and defense.
In the nominated landscape, 720 elements from the period of the Central Middle Ages are still in use, establish the identity of the region and give testimony of the shaping of border lands during a period of no more than 200 years in the High Middle Ages, which has in this instance been tangibly preserved to present day.

== Description of the cultural landscape ==
The landscape is characterized by authentic monuments, intact urban morphology and unchanged rural landscape from the High Middle Ages visible in Naumburg and Freyburg, around the villages of Ebersroda, Schleberoda, Gross-Wilsdorf and Flemmingen, as well as the vineyards of Dechantenberg, Schweigenberg, Köppelberg, and Saalhäuser. In total, four castles and four monastic complexes, two cities as well as villages, vineyards, fertile fields and pastures constitute this nomination. They form a serial nomination with a total of 11 components parts:

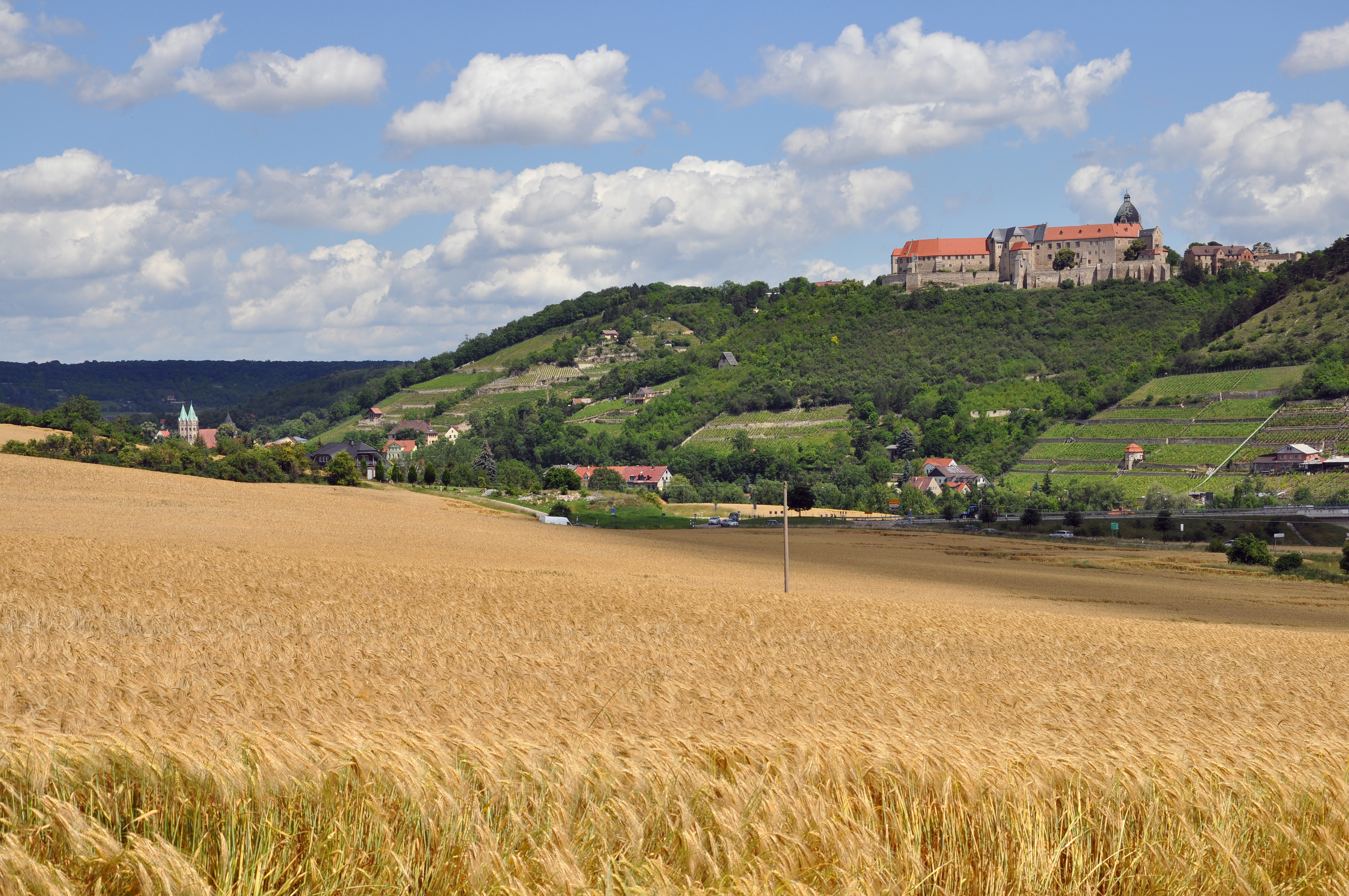
Landscape around Neuenburg

1. Naumburg
2. Schönburg Castle
3. Goseck
4. Freyburg
5. Schleberoda
6. Ebersroda
7. Großwilsdorf and the Rödel Plateau
8. Kleinjena
9. Pforta monastery
10. Saaleck
11. Flemmingen

The nominated property is surrounded by a buffer zone ensuring the protection of relevant view axes and topographical characteristics as well as the integrity of the property.

=== Component: Naumburg ===
==== Naumburg Cathedral ====
Naumburg Cathedral is known for its architecture, sculptures and images: "The harmonic connection between architecture, sculpture and stained glass windows in the west choir of the cathedral counts among the most impressive creations of human creativity in the Middle Ages at large."
The Romanesque core structure is flanked by two Gothic choirs in the east and in the west, built in the transitional style between Late Romanesque and Early Gothic.

===== The Naumburg Masters =====
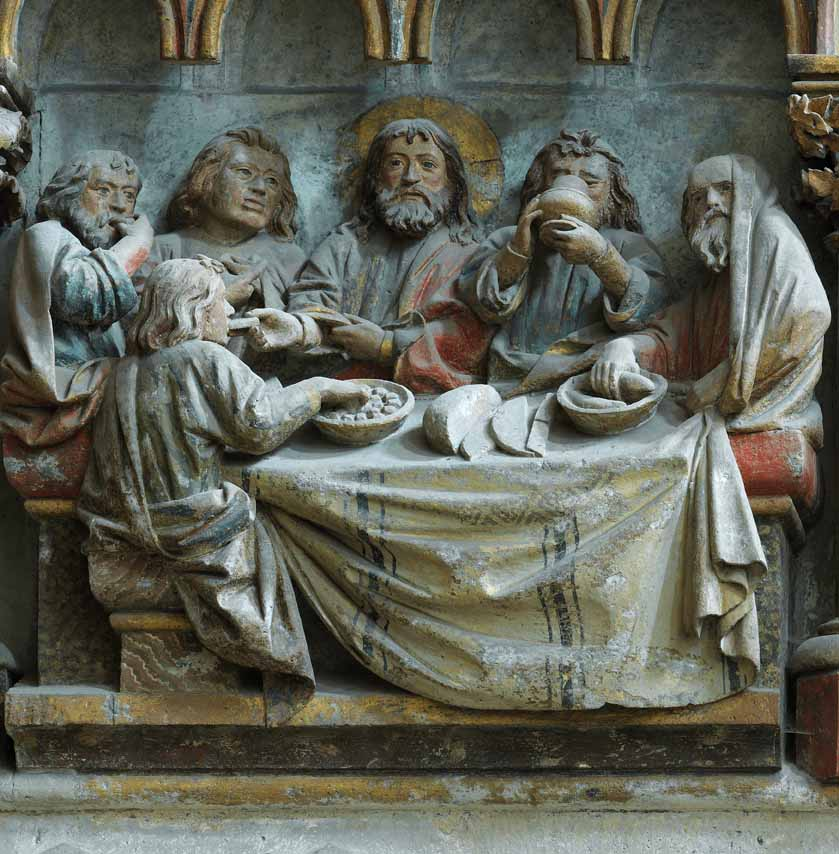
Naumburg Masters

The worldwide known workshop of sculptors and stonemasons, which was likely established in the early 13th century, known as the Naumburg Masters, was headed by a sculptor-architect, who has been described by scholars as "an artist of real genius". The quality of the work of the Naumburg Masters, marked by an extraordinary realism and individualism of sculptures and a detailed representation of the environment such as plants or ornaments, has justified Naumburg's reputation beyond its region. The Naumburg Masters were conveyors and pioneers of the innovations in architecture and sculpture of the Late Hohenstaufen period in the 13th century. Their building workshop has left traces of its work all the way from Northern France over the Middle Rhine area up to the eastern boundaries of the German Empire and further on the southwestern Europe. It reflects the cultural artistic exchange during the High Middle Ages.

===== Choir screens – Passion of Christ =====
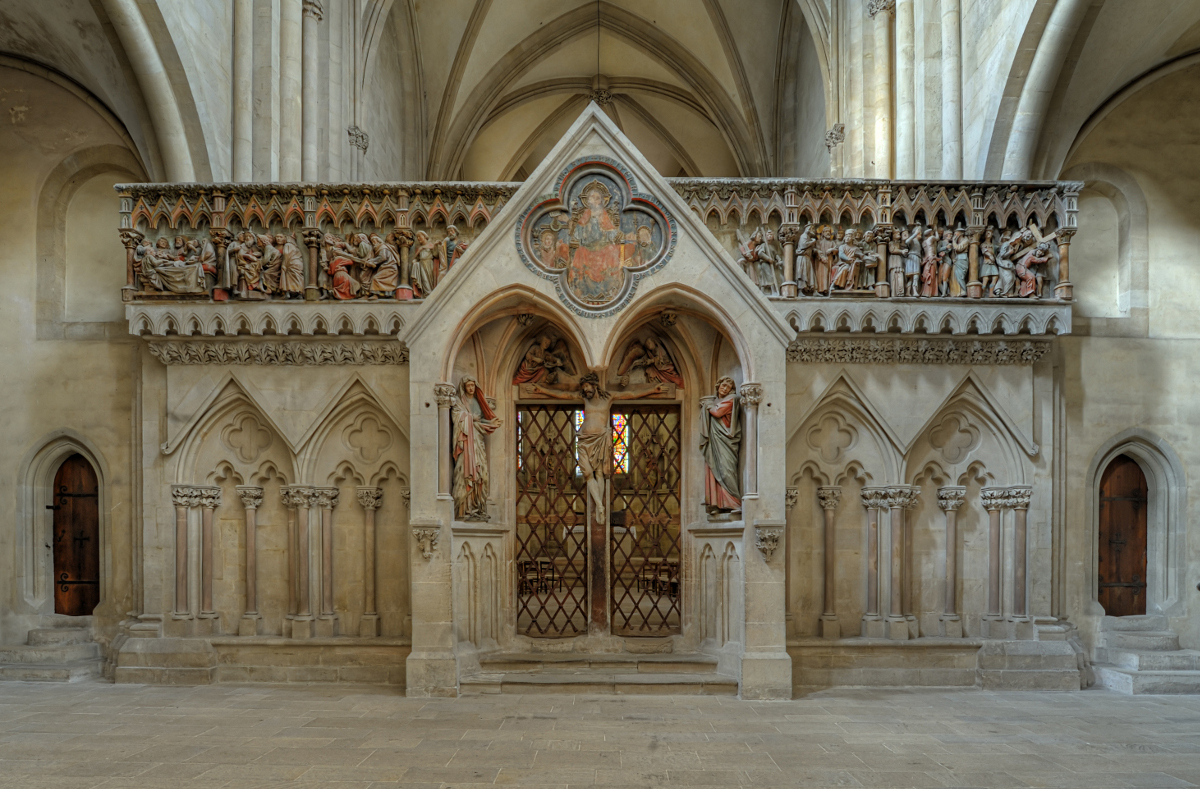
West choir

One feature of the Naumburg Cathedral is its two almost completely preserved choir screen structures from the 13th century. In the east choir, the only late Romanesque hall choir screen has survived. In the west choir, there is a Gothic partition-type screen: "Even within the tiny corpus of medieval churches whose original configurations of architecture and sculpture remain intact, the arrangement at Naumburg is unique."
The western mural choir screen shows artistic quality in terms of architecture, ornamentation and figural sculptures: "The mid-thirteenth-century west choir of Naumburg Cathedral has long been admired both for its unified architectural design"." The architecture has an organic character and provides information details such as historic local plants. The conceptually sophisticated arrangement of the passion of Christ is one of the most outstanding among the preserved sculptural ensembles from the 13th century, providing i.a. detailed information on contemporary clothing. The Naumburg Master achieved a degree of dramatic expressiveness and natural vibrancy that conveys the suffering of Christ and the deep grief of Mary and St. John. The statues of the mourning Mary and St. John catch the viewers attention and draw them close to Christ.

===== Founder statues – Uta =====
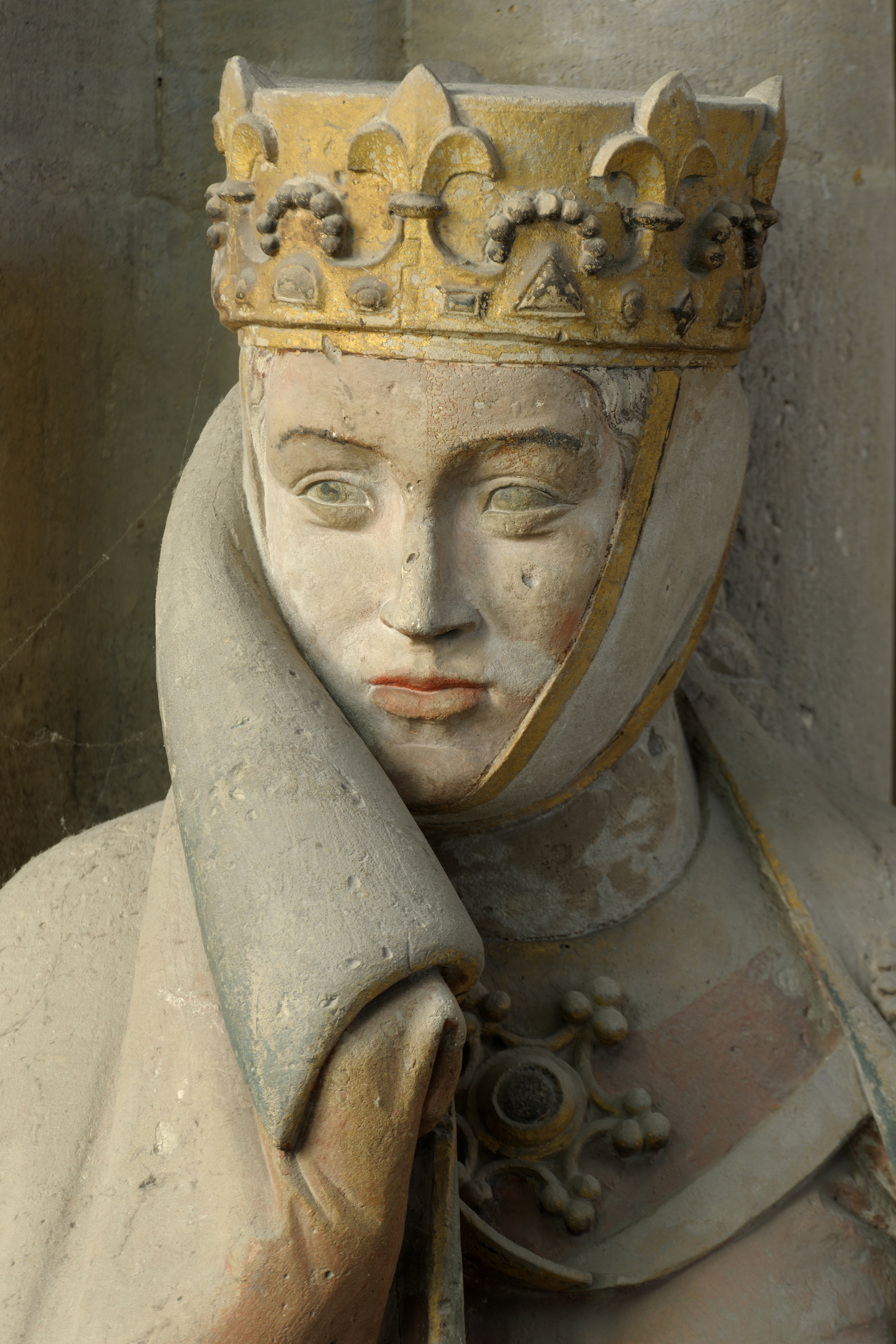
Uta von Ballenstedt statue, located in the west choir of the Naumburg Cathedral

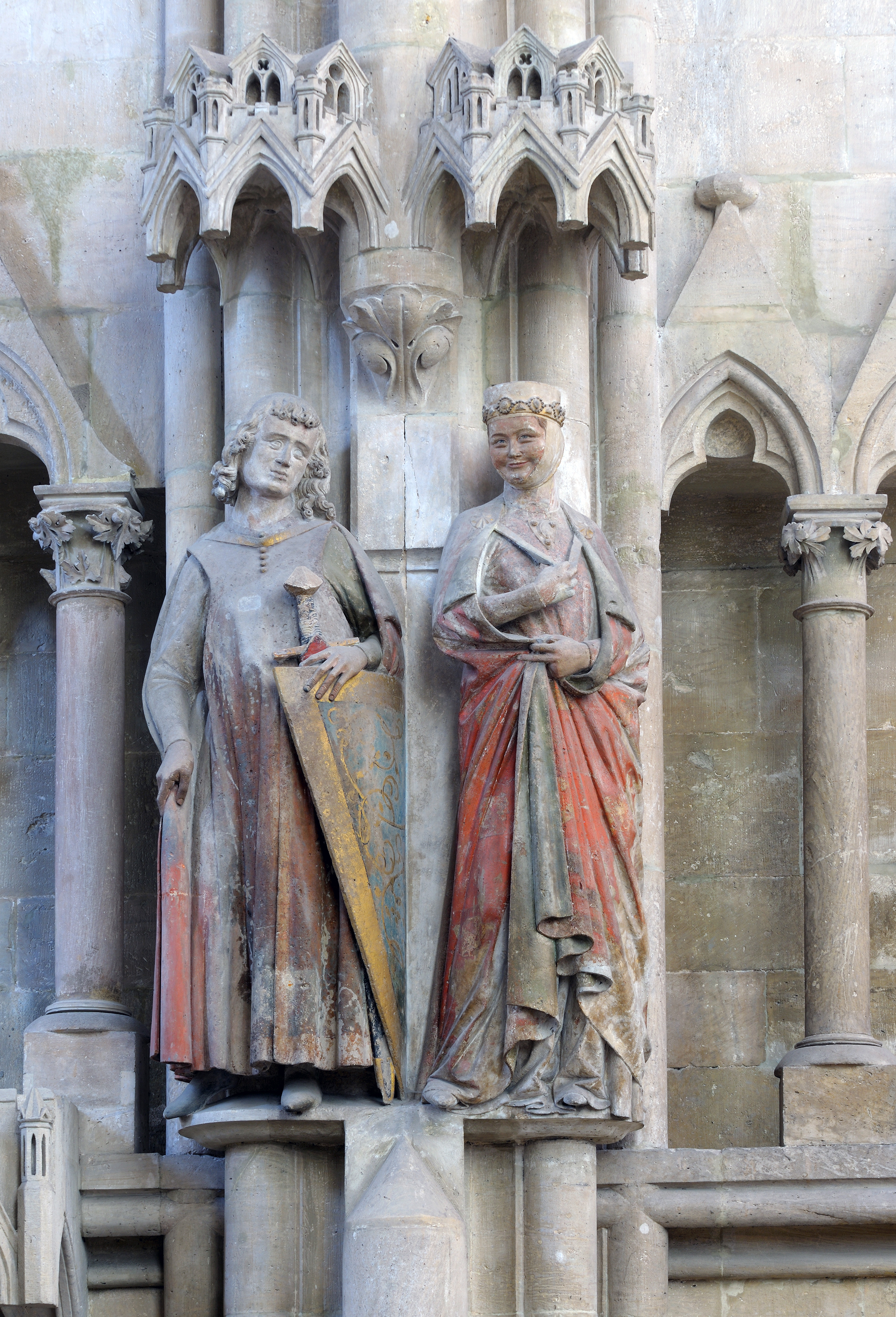
Founder figures Hermann und Reglindis

The Early Gothic west choir was built with an elevated gallery portraying the founders. The life-sized representation of a group of 12 people of the high nobility that were neither emperor neither king is unique in art history : "The twelve founder statues [...] are extraordinary in many aspects. A series of monumental representations of secular male and female founders of the cathedral of Naumburg, the statues are characterized by startling vividness and by theatrical interaction". The statues are considered "sculptural ensemble of the major arts" due to their expressiveness and to the individualized portraits. There cannot be found comparable examples from the same period.

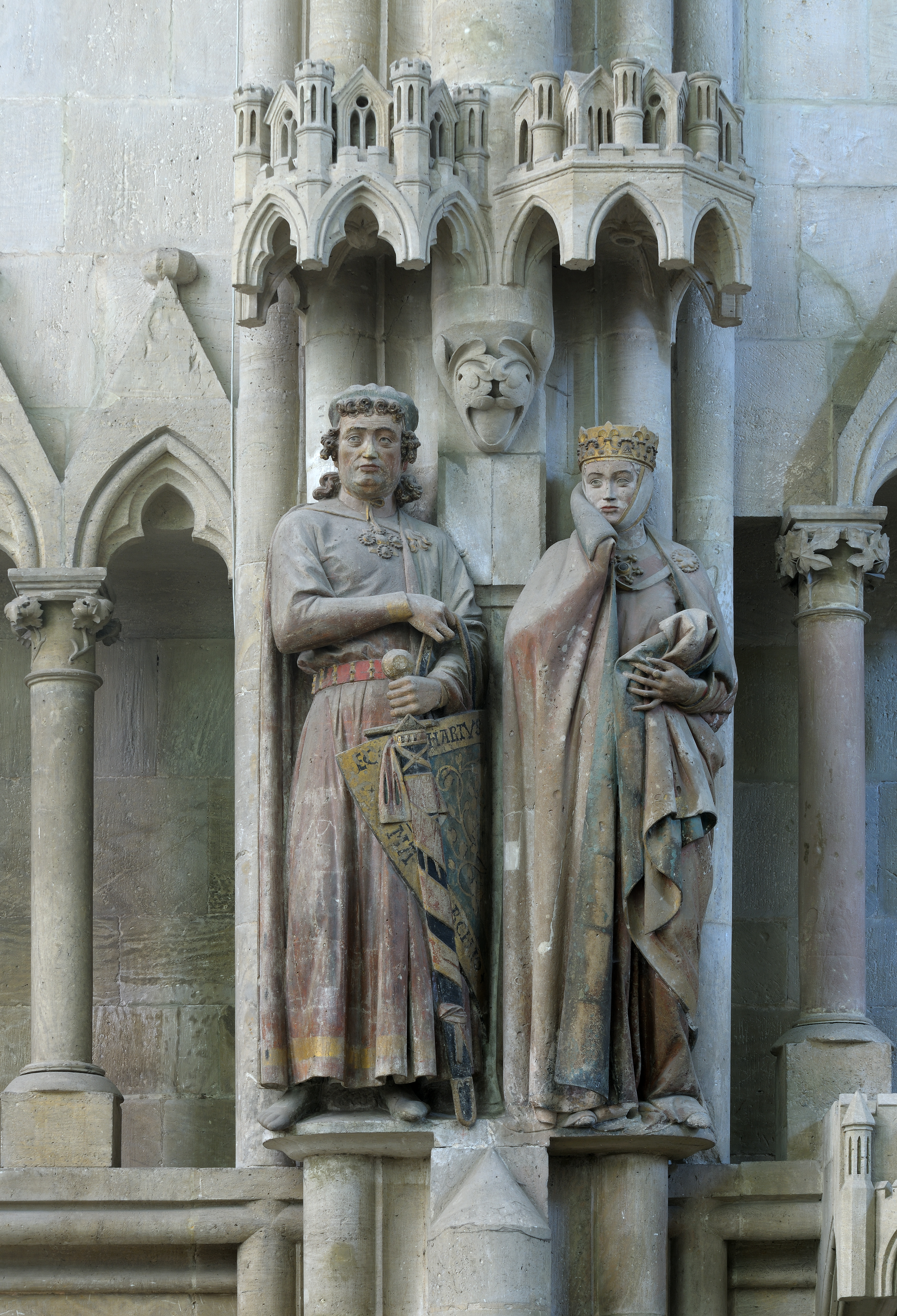
Founder figures Ekkehard und Uta

One founder couple, Ekkehard II, Margrave of Meissen, with his wife Uta von Ballenstedt, stands in the north. Margravess Uta is presented like a queen with a fleur-de-lis crown. The sculpture of Uta has experienced an unparalleled cult, due considerably to photographs taken by the Naumburger photographer Walter Hege in the 1920s. Umberto Eco wrote in his "History of Beauty" that from all women of art history, the one he would like most have dinner with was in first place, ahead of all others, Uta von Naumburg. The founder figure of Uta also found her way in the UFA motion pictures and as the Queen of Disney's Snow White, causing a huge wave of enthusiasm for this icon of gothic art.

===== Glass painting =====
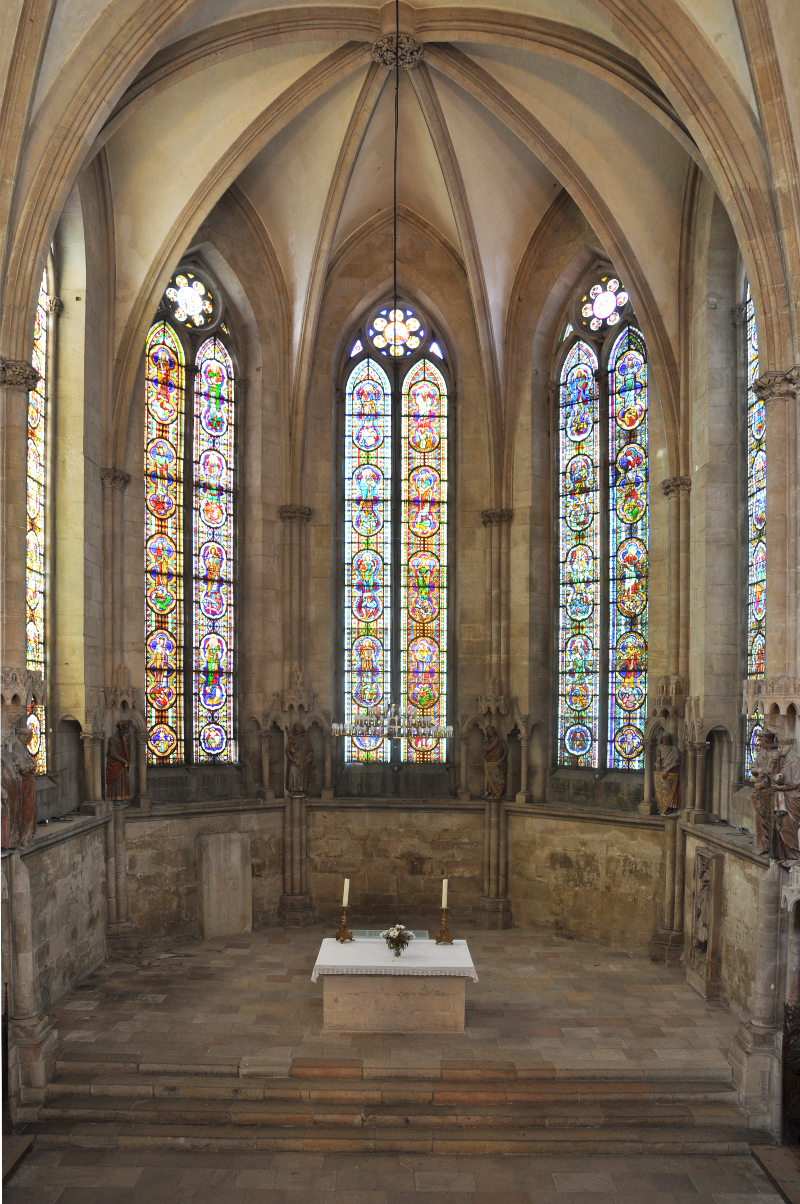
West choir Naumburg

The window paintings of the west choir were created from an unknown glass painting workshop in close consultation with the building workshop of the Naumburg Master, together creating unity and harmony. This becomes evident by the designs of the images of the saints that correspond with the founders' sculptures in many aspects like positions, gestures and weapons. The portrayal of ten bishops of Naumburg at the bottom of the window rows creates the impression as if the statues of the founders were standing on the same level as the medals. The glass paintings count among the most significant glass paintings of their style from the 13th century.

===== Old Town of Naumburg =====
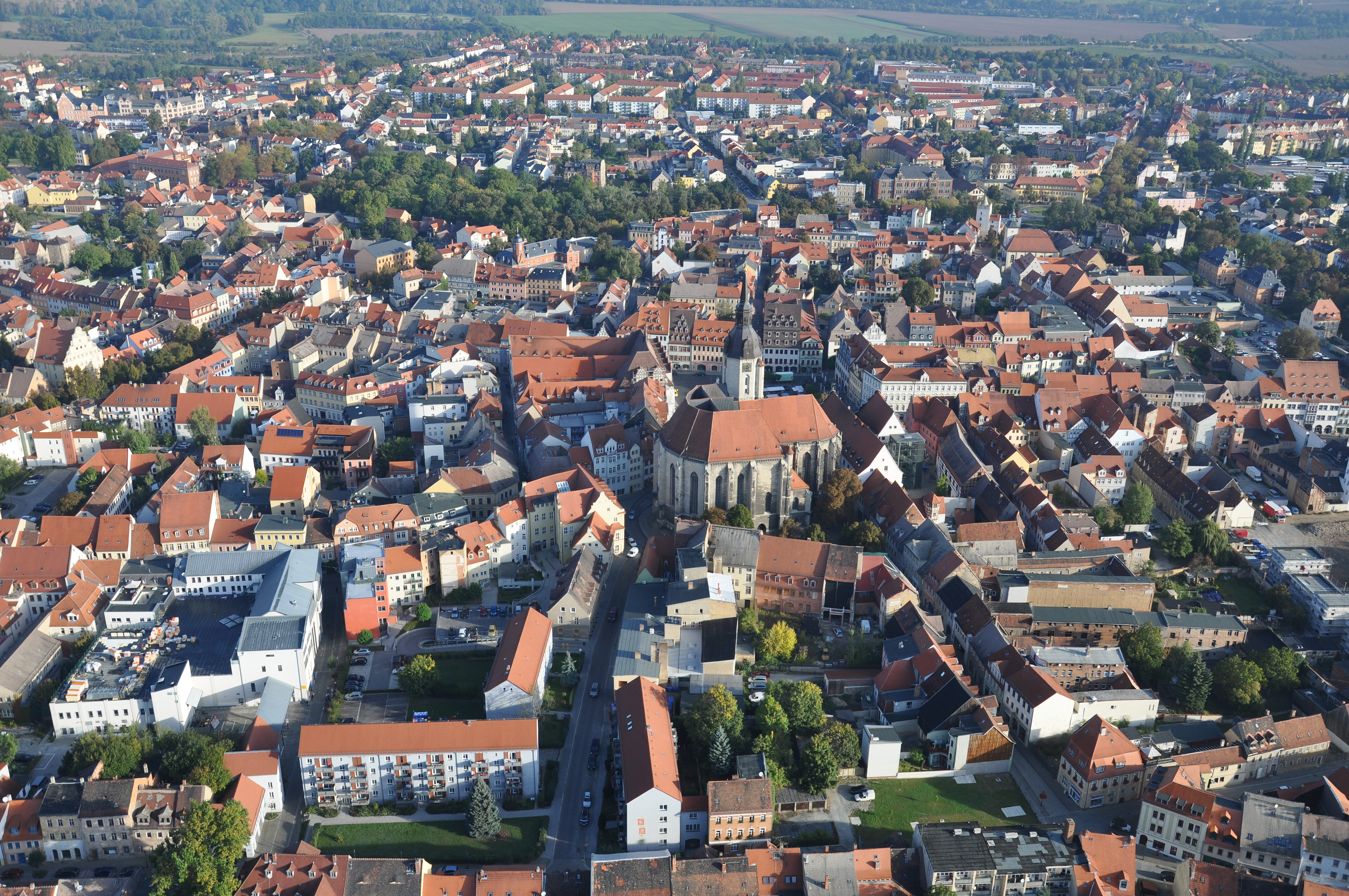
Old city of Naumburg

Naumburg was a bishop's seat and an important market place founded at the beginning of the 11th century on the place of the former Slav fortress of Wethau. The development of the town is closely connected with one of the most powerful and noble Ekkehardine dynasty of that time, Emperor Conrad II and Bishop Hildeward of Zeitz. With the consent of the pope John XIX and the emperor Konrad II, as well as citing the danger of Slav incursions, margrave Ekkerhard I relocated the Episcopal See of Zeitz to Naumburg. Along with the bishop's seat he transferred his own family seat from Kleinjena to their own estate at the new castle "Nuwemburch" in Naumburg around 1028. Furthermore, he assigned the protection of the See to the "new castle", an event hitherto unparalleled in the history of the empire. This bold move enabled the construction of the first early Romanesque cathedral in Naumburg.

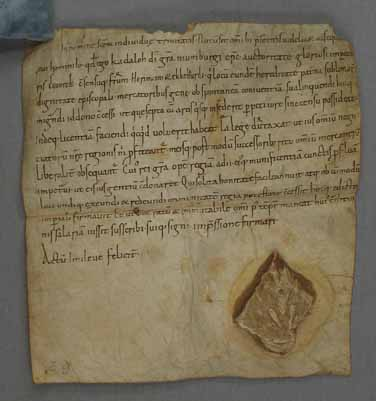
Certificate Naumburg

In 1033, another highly unusual event for this time took place: On the initiative of the bishop Kadeloh of Memleben, Emperor Conrad II granted the merchants of Kleinjena, who moved to Naumburg free trade and the heritable, interest-free ownership of their enclosed domicile. It is the earliest dated written document from 13 July 1033, that marked the Nuvemburg to the powerful market and merchant settlement in Naumburg.
Margraves Ekkehard II and Hermann also established two monasteries, the Benedictine Monastery of St. George and the St Moritz Monastery. When the Ekkehardine dynasty died out by 1046, the bishops became the rulers of the town. By that time, Naumburg had already developed into a political, economic and religious center for the entirety of this border region. The trade routes in the region were relocated to Naumburg, which was strategically situated at the crossing of the Via Regia and the Regensburg Road. Nowadays, the roads as well as parcel structures reflect the structure of the medieval civil town. The earliest stone buildings in Naumburg are situated in the cathedral precincts with the oldest residential tower of Naumburg with two Romanesque floors constructed probably in the mid-12th century at the cathedral precincts.

=== Component: Freyburg ===
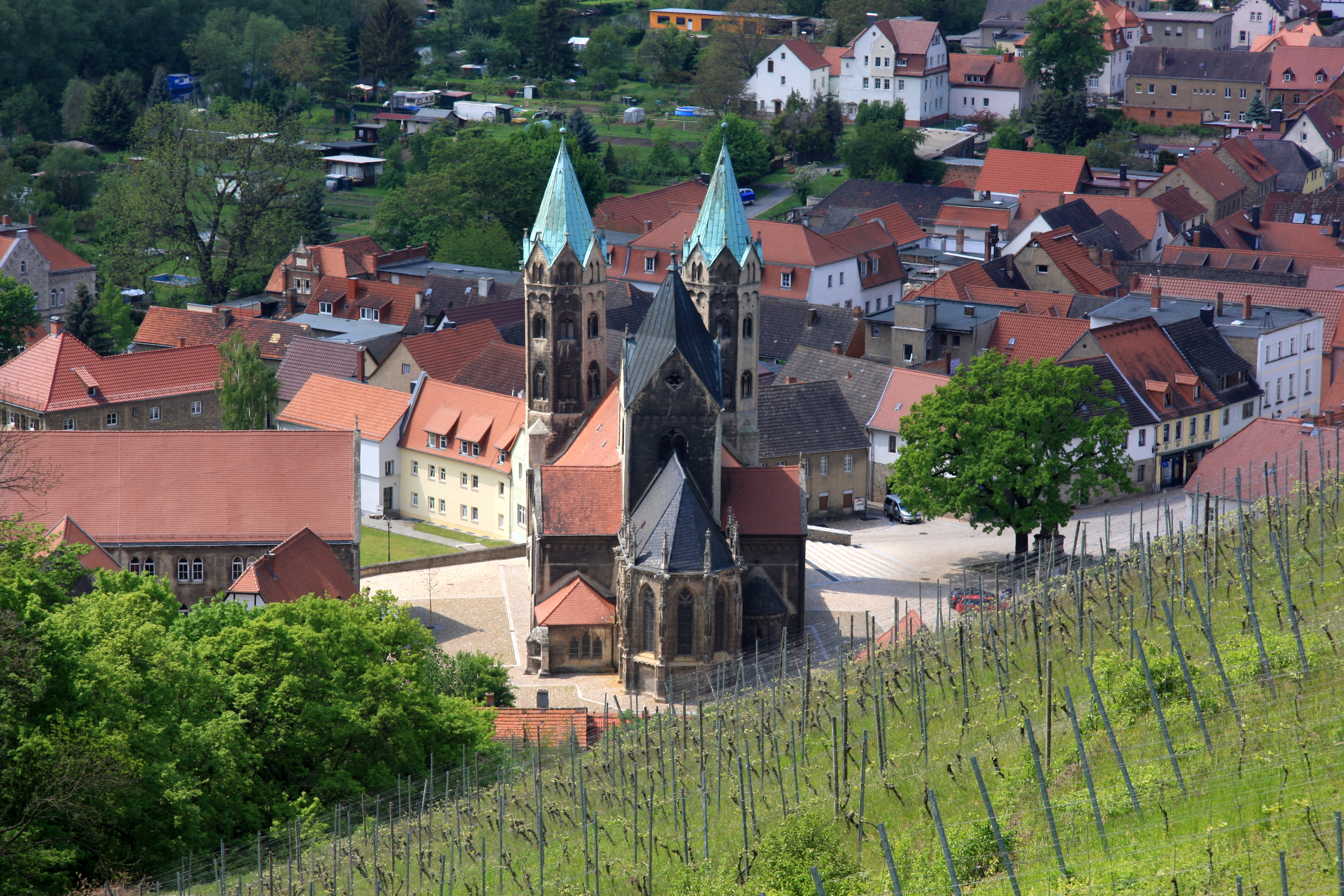
Church of Freyburg

The old town of Freyburg is situated 9 kilometers north of Naumburg on the left bank of the Unstrut River. This component contains Neuenburg Castle above the river valley. The Schweigenberg vineyard stretches along the slopes towards Zscheiplitz Monastery.

==== Neuenburg Castle ====
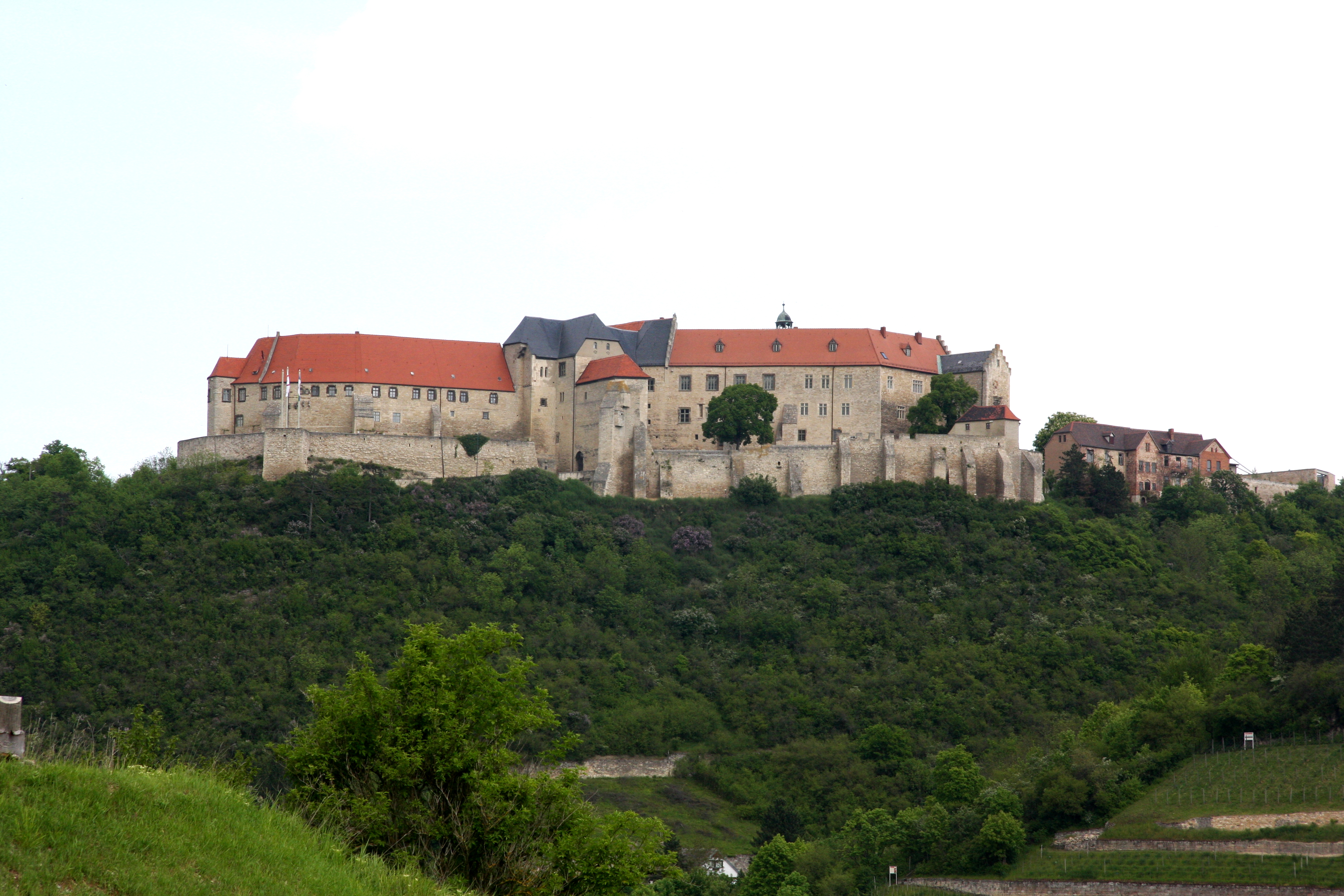
Neuenburg Chapel

Around 1090, it was most probably Louis the Springer who built the vast and impressive complex of Neuenburg Castle. Situated in the border region, this fortified castle served military purposes and reflected ambitions, self-confidence and sophistication of the Ludowingians. Already in 1100, Neuenburg Castle was the largest and most important fortification in central Germany and remained of outstanding political and military significance until the 13th century. It was designed as a border castle for the powerful Ludowinger dynasty and was part of a network of the landgraves' castles, which also included Wartburg Castle.

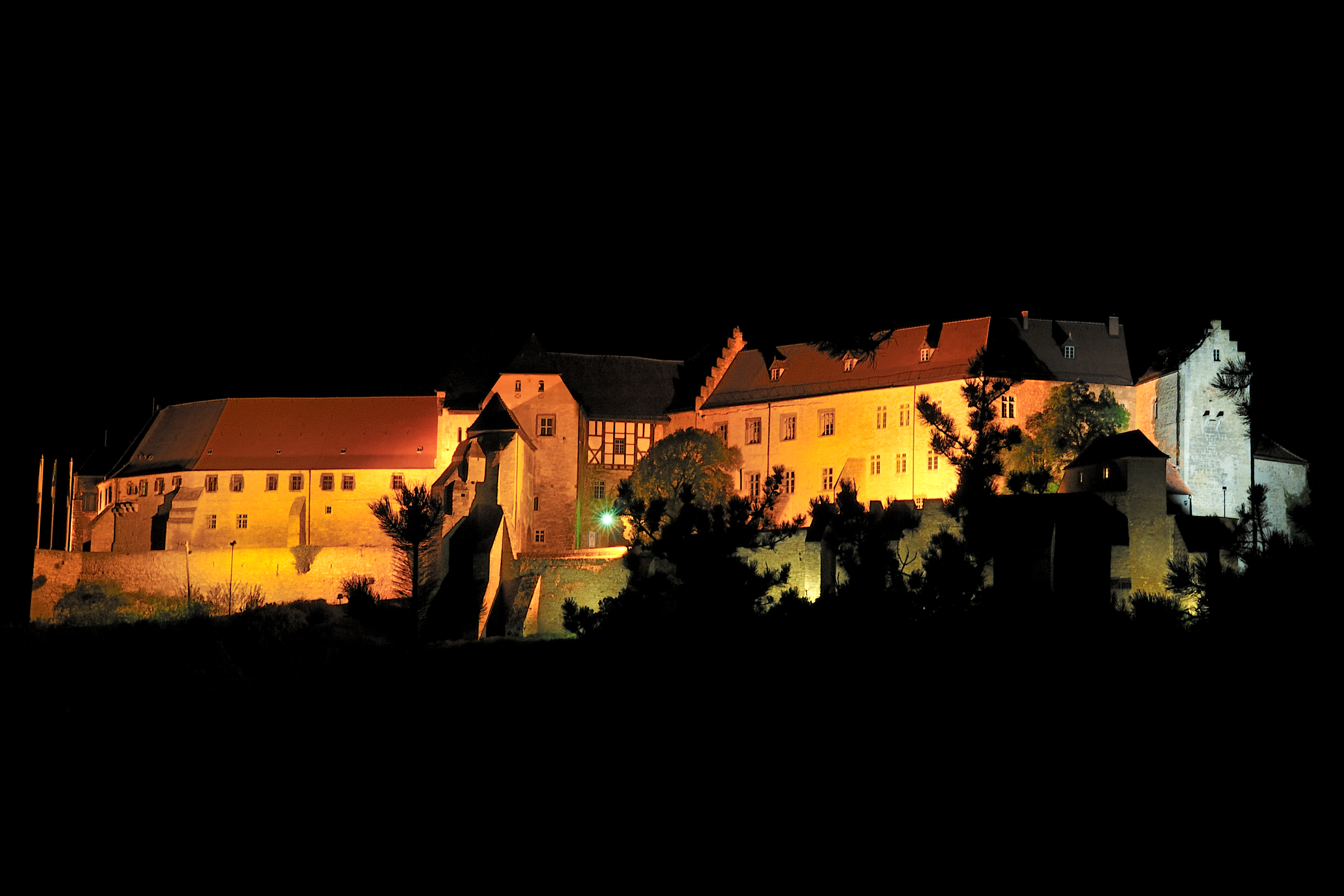
Neuenburg at night

Built around 1090, Neuenburg Castle was extended and modernized on a large scale several times. With its 30 000 square meters, the castle was amongst the strongest architectural representations of military power in all of the empire. It has survived to a remarkable extend: Major sections of the curtain walls in the north and east, part of the gate, the bottom part of the castle, the castle keep, trenches in the east and in the south are conserved until today. The landmark big William (Dicker Wilhelm) is situated in the north-eastern part of the complex and visible from far away as a symbol of power. The castle keep III is classified as an independent development next to the similar residential towers (donjons) in the Rhineland region. Around 1225, a residential tower (residential tower II) was built probably for the landgrave's family outside the southern curtain wall. 1172 Emperor Friedrich I Barbarossa visited Neuenburg Castle – the legend of the "living wall" of soldiers providing the best military defense has its roots in this legendary visit.

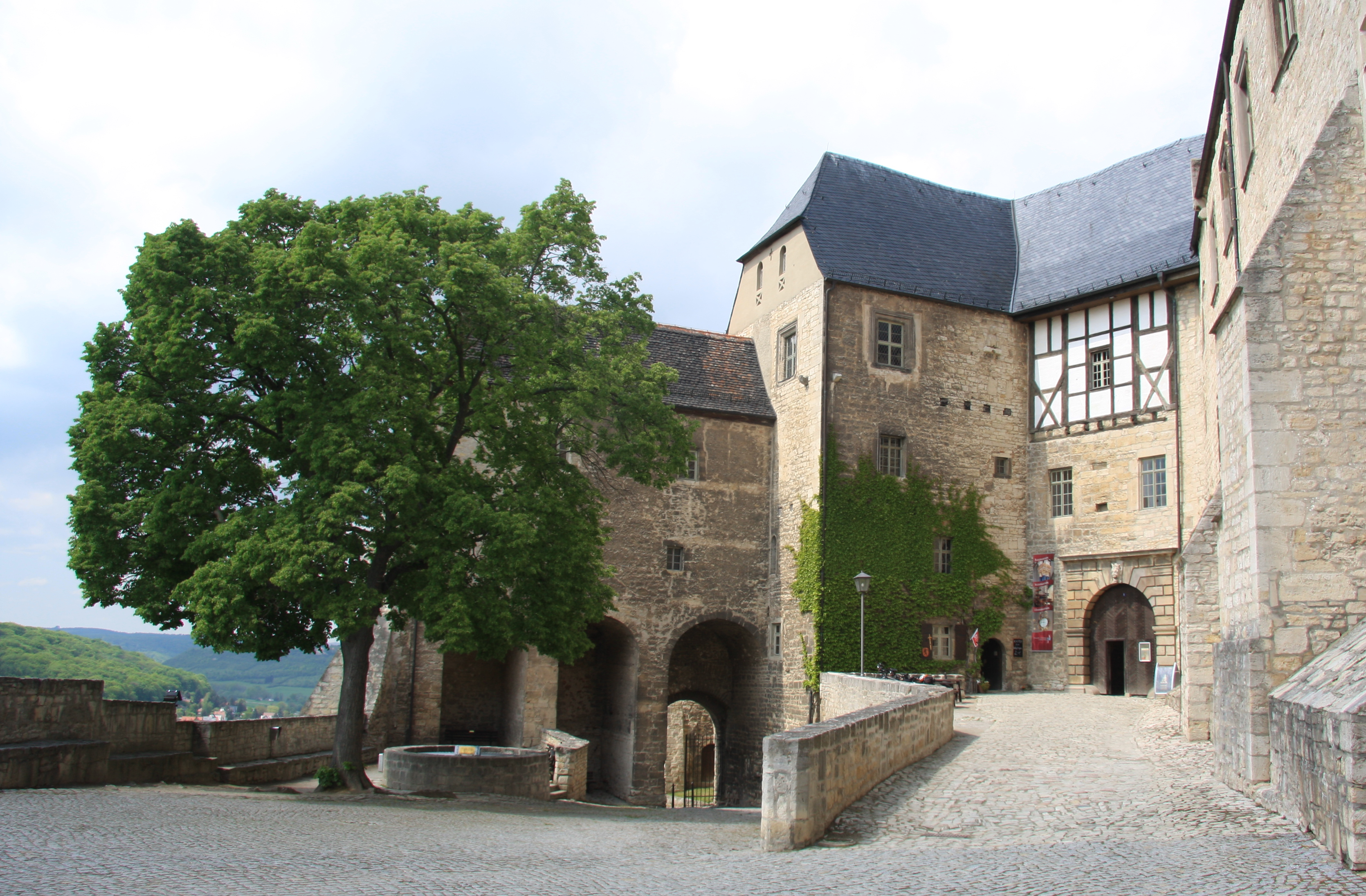
Residence building at Neuenburg

The court culture of the Count Palatine at Neuenburg Castle was an extremely important center of literary activities in the Empire at the end of the 12th and beginning of the 13th century. The most important poets of the 13th century, namely Wolfram von Eschenbach and Walther von der Vogelweide stayed at Neuenburg Castle. Heinrich von Weldecke completed here the Eneas novel which was the foundation of the German language secular epic. "When Veldeke was called to the court of Thuringia [..], he joined the entourage of a great patron and became the esteemed center of the most important literary circle that existed in Germany at the time".

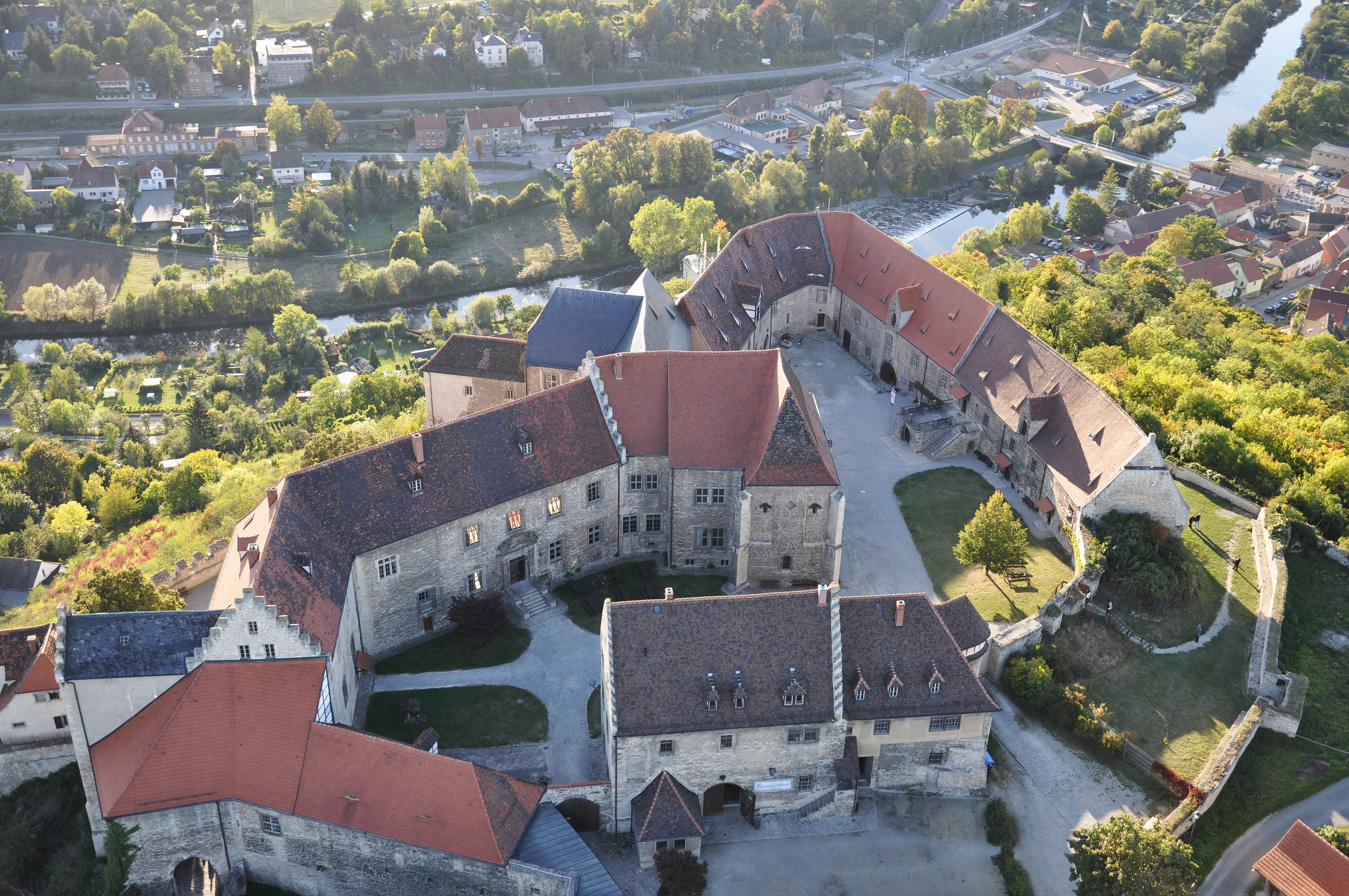
Neuenburg view

The Double Chapel of Neuenburg was developed around 1220 and is one of the best preserved Romanesque buildings of Neuenburg Castle.
In terms of its architectural shapes and structural ornamentation, it is a unique achievement by combining the Saxon tradition with the then latest developments in art which emerged in the Rhineland region.
The upper floor of the Double Chapel is a landmark of art because of the play of colors of the black column shafts made of carboniferous limestone, which came from the Northern French and Belgian region of the Ardennes, 500 kilometers away with the multi-coloured structural ornamentation. The polyglobed arches on the underside of the transverse arches are an example for the influences from the Morish part of Spain transmitted by Rhenanian Art. They are the only example of this form of ornament to the east of the Rhine and thus represent a unique item in architectural history.

==== Old town of Freyburg ====
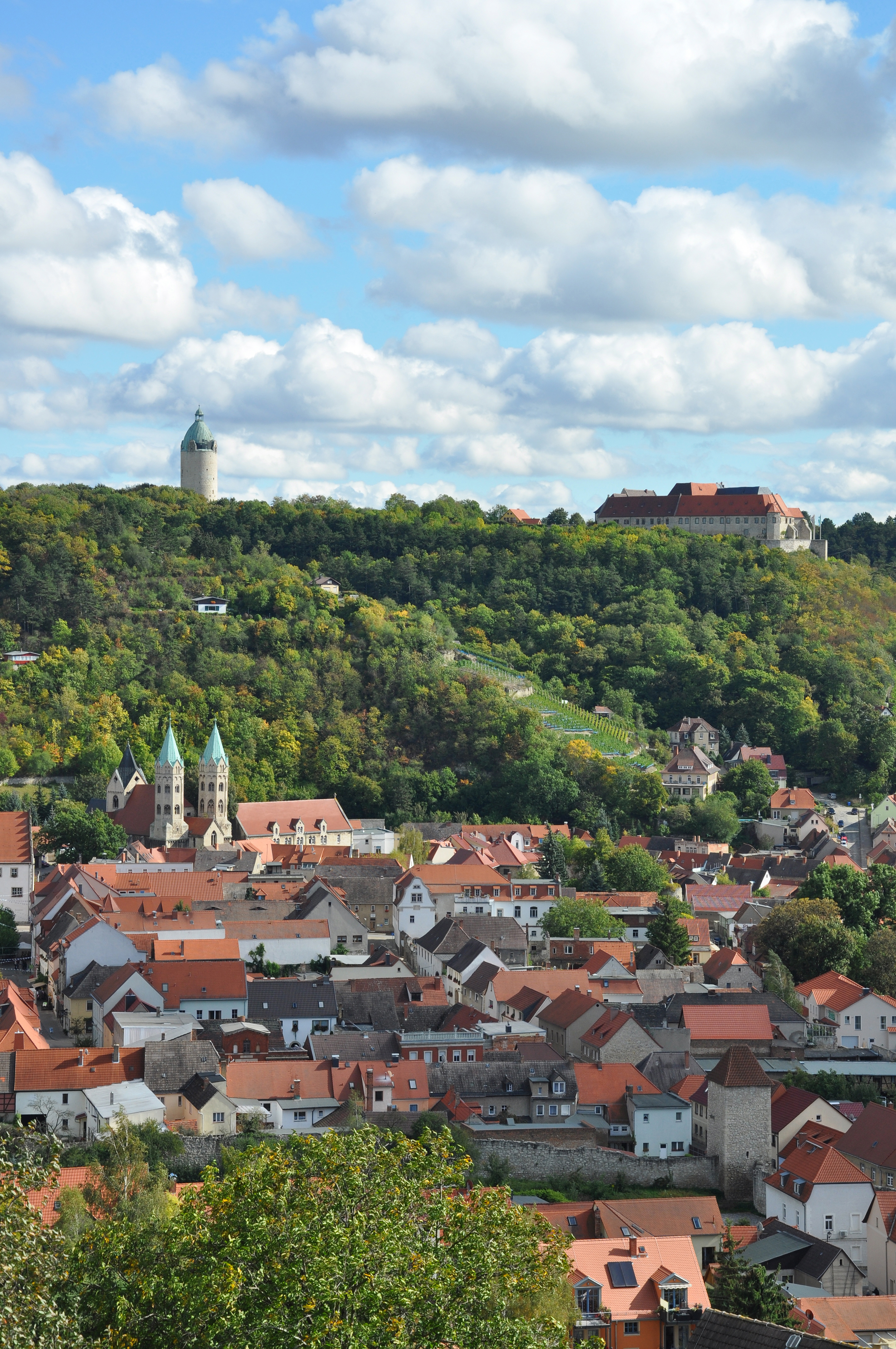
Neuenburg view from Freyburg

In the last quarter of the 12th, Herman I from the Ludowinger dynasty founded the town of Freyburg. The town was built at the food of Neuenburg Castle around a rectangular market place to meet the demands of the increased population, to provide the Neuenburg Castle with merchandise and to secure the passage and revenues of the Unstrut River. The landgraves of Thuringia controlled the road in the valley by erecting this fortified town. The determinative "frey" (free) referred to the royal freedom granted to it when it was founded and to the baronial privilege of a nearly royal rank, which primarily reveals the self-image of its rulers. The unity of Neuenburg castle and the town of Freyburg is a typical feature of the policy of power of the Ludowingers.

The landgraves were not directly present in the town but resided in Neuenburg Castle. Landgrove Ludwig IV and his wife, the later Saint Elizabeth of Hungary, built the town parish church of St Mary's to emphasize the baronial need for representation. The capital ornamentation in the entrance area with its diamond-shaped net and the Romanesque sculpting of the compact tympanum is of outstanding quality in the way of the curves of the bodies and the graphic lines of the figures were sculptured. Freyburg's regular layout is a grid of roads crossing each other in right angles, a distinct transverse axis and its nearly exact subdivision in blocks. After the extinction of the Ludowinger dynasty in 1247, the city lost its significance but continued its viticulture for which it is still known in the Saale-Unstrut region today.

==== Zscheiplitz Monastery ====
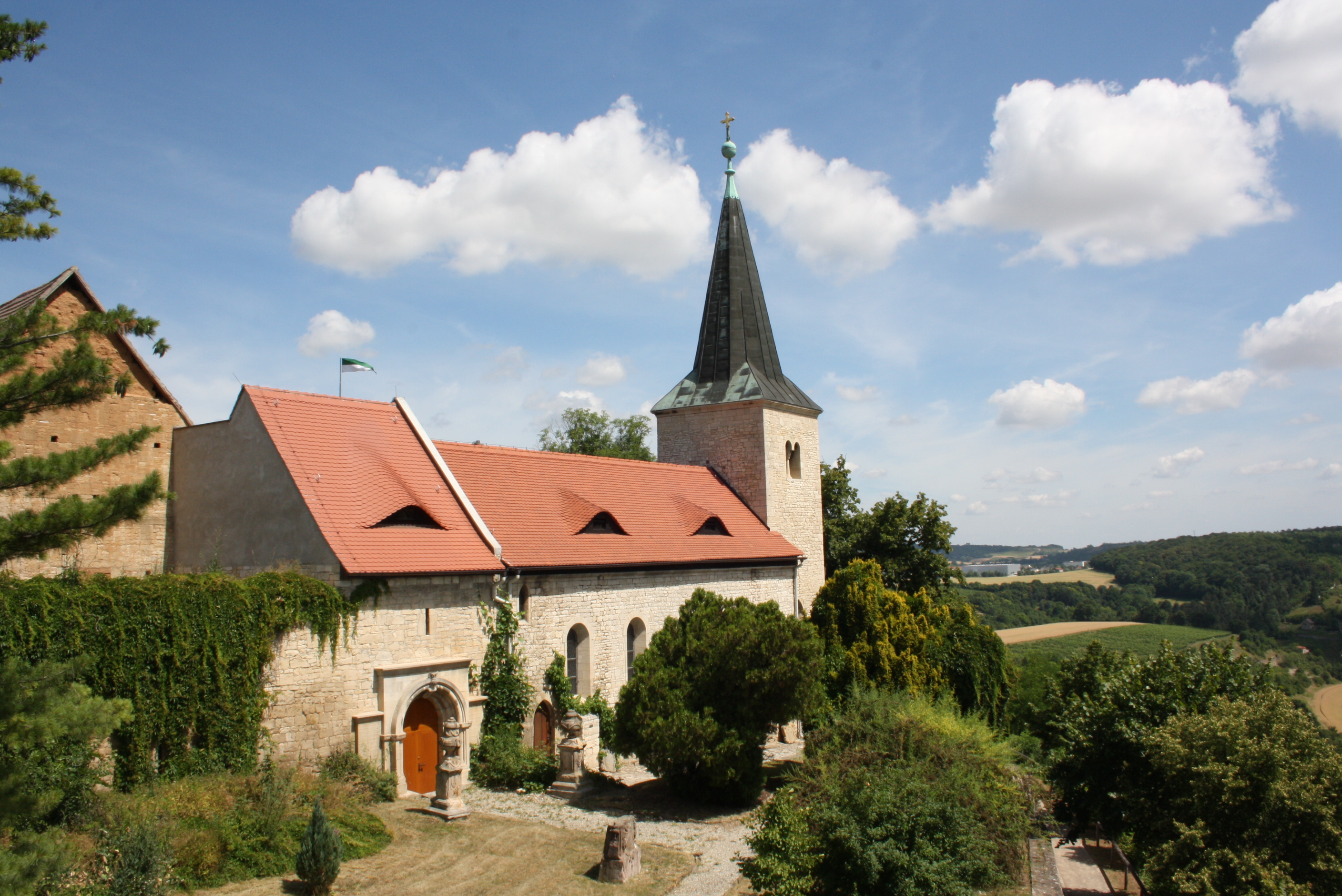
Church in Zscheiplitz

The Benedictine convent of nuns, the Zscheiplitz Monastery, was first mentioned in 1203 and is situated two kilometers west of Freyburg. The name of Zscheiplitz has its roots in the Slavic name "ciplic" (small). Around 1085, after the murder of landgrave Friedrich III, his widow Adelheid donated the estate of Zscheiplitz to the church. It was then turned into a Benedictine monastery.

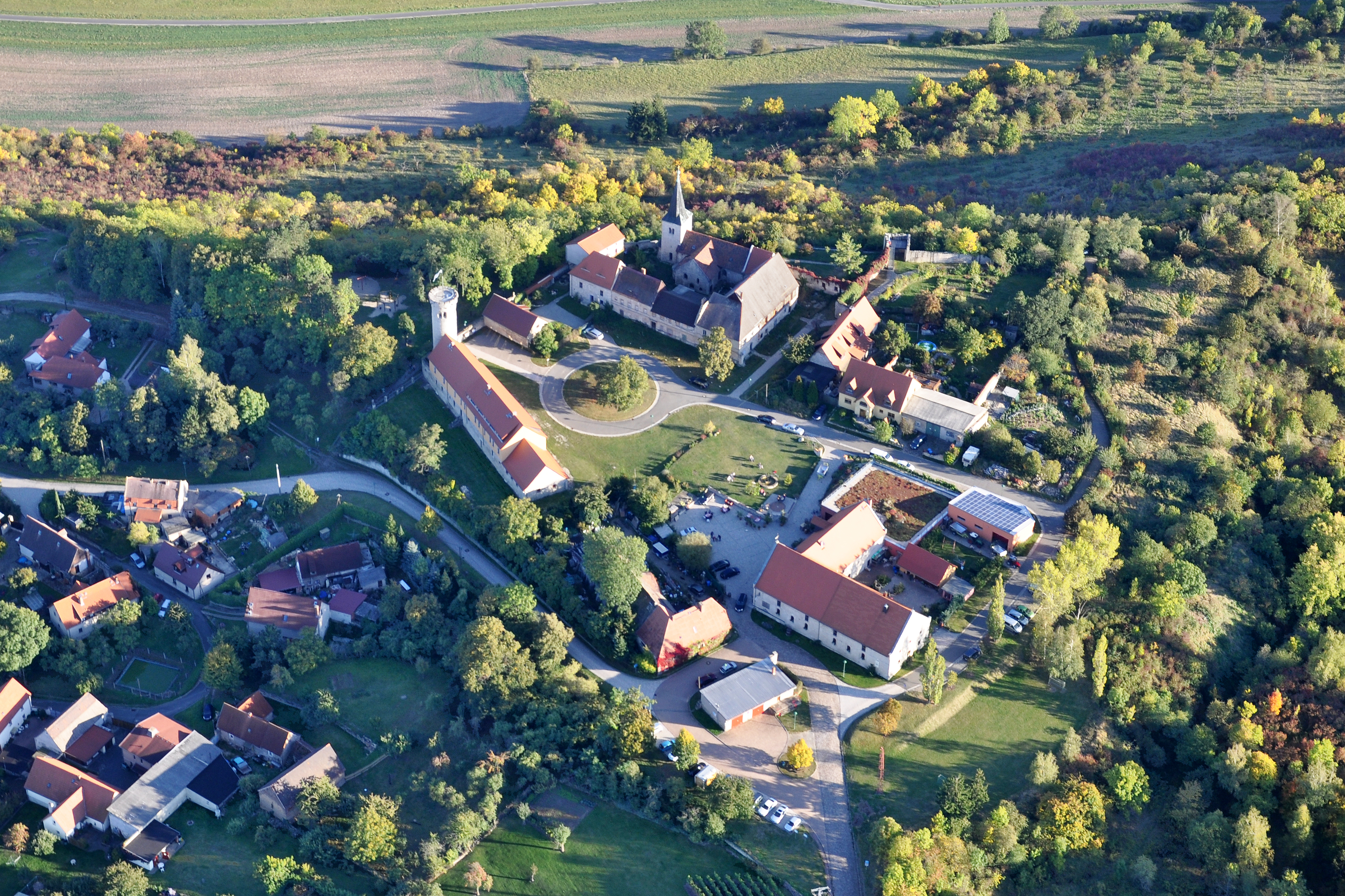
Zscheiplitz view

The church of Zscheiplitz was built as a one-nave church in the 12th century and extended by a gallery to the west and in the north during the 13th century.

==== Vineyard of Schweigenberg ====
The vineyard of Schweigenberg is located west of Freyburg and was probably created by citizens of Freyburg upon the initiative of the landgraves of Thuringia and / or the monasteries of Goseck and Zscheiplitz in the 13th century. It benefitted from favorable climatic conditions and agrarian innovations for a diversified subsistence economy in the region. This vineyard is still recognized in Germany as a prime example of terraced winegrowing by way of hoe-farming as a monument of this traditional form of cultivation.

=== Component: Pforta ===
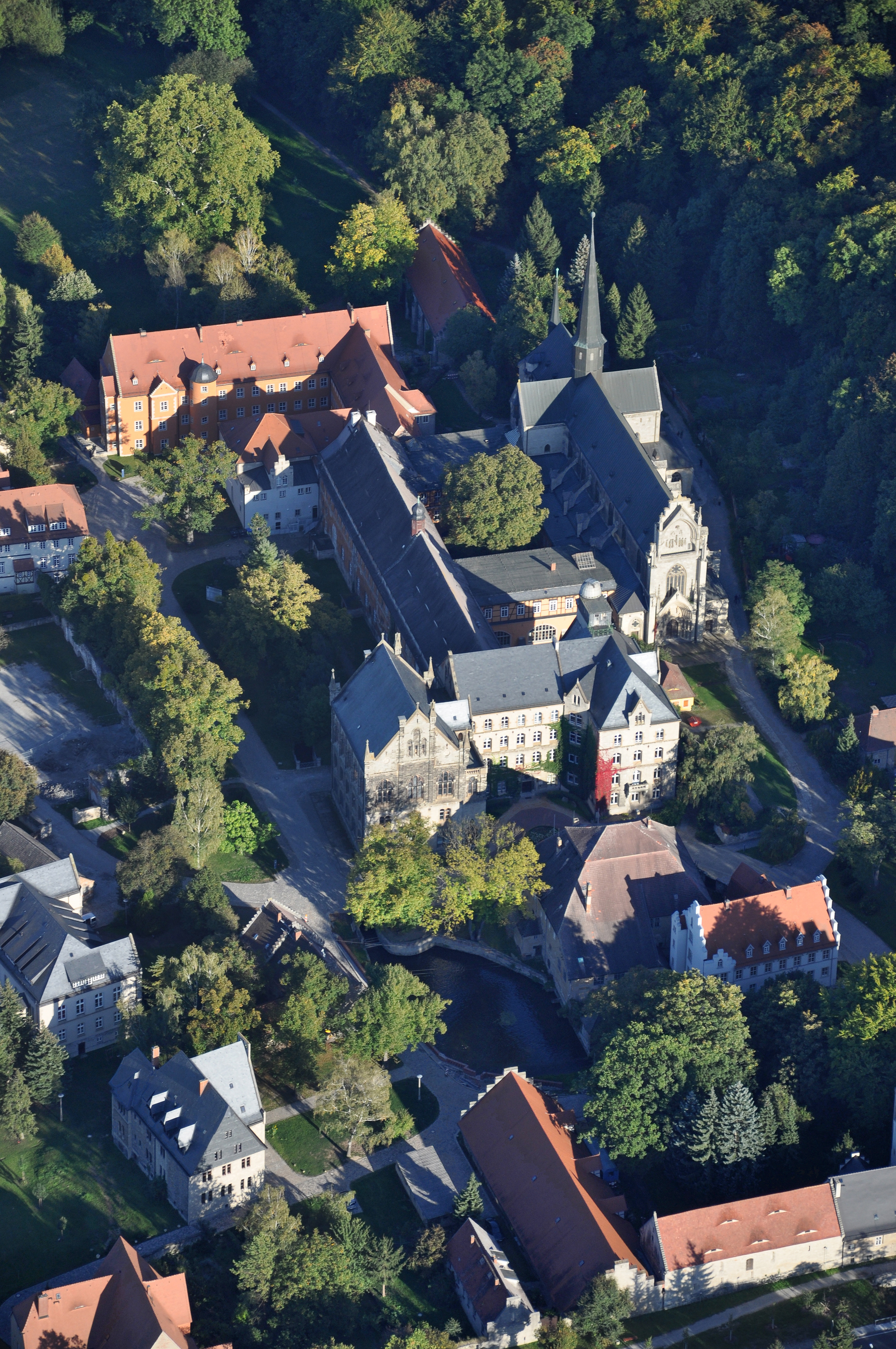
Pforta from air

The monastery of Pforta was created by the Cistercian Order. The premises include functional buildings, the Romanesque House (grange), the Kleine Saale canal, as well as the vineyards of Köppelberg and Saalhäuser. The ensemble of Cistercian monuments attests to the order's life and work and embodies the significant influence exerted in the wider Saale-Unstrut region and beyond the boundaries of the region.

==== History ====
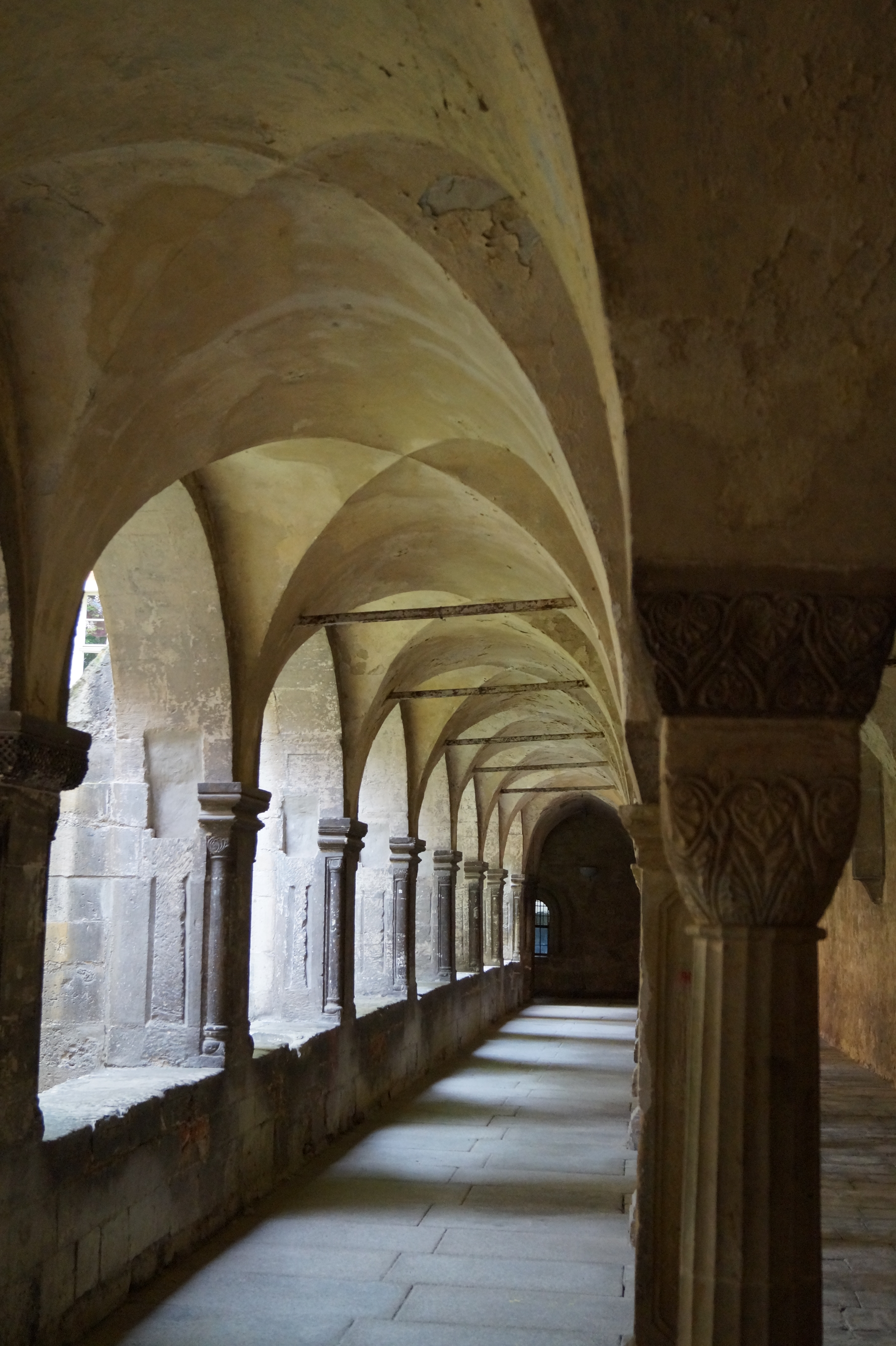
Monastery Pforta

Pforta Monastery was founded around 1132 on the initiative of bishop Udo I of Naumburg. It received only a very modest endowment of the order In order to be self-sufficient, it was located in the flood plain on the right bank of the Saale River to ensure sufficient water supply.
The monks cultivated previous wetland areas and the monastery became soon one of the wealthiest and most influential monasteries throughout Central Germany for 400 years before it was closed in the course of the Reformation. (Note: A saying of the 12th century states the immense cultivation and colonization capacity of the Cistercians "Give the monks a moor or a wild forest, let some years pass by, and you will find not only beautiful churches but also human settlements at this place".)
The name of Porta, meaning Porta Coeli – i.e. Pearly Gates –, refers to the architecture of the richly ornamented western façade of the minster with its Roman triumphal arch portal and a gallery underneath the crucifixion group that did not at all correspond to the strict stipulations of the order.

==== Architecture ====
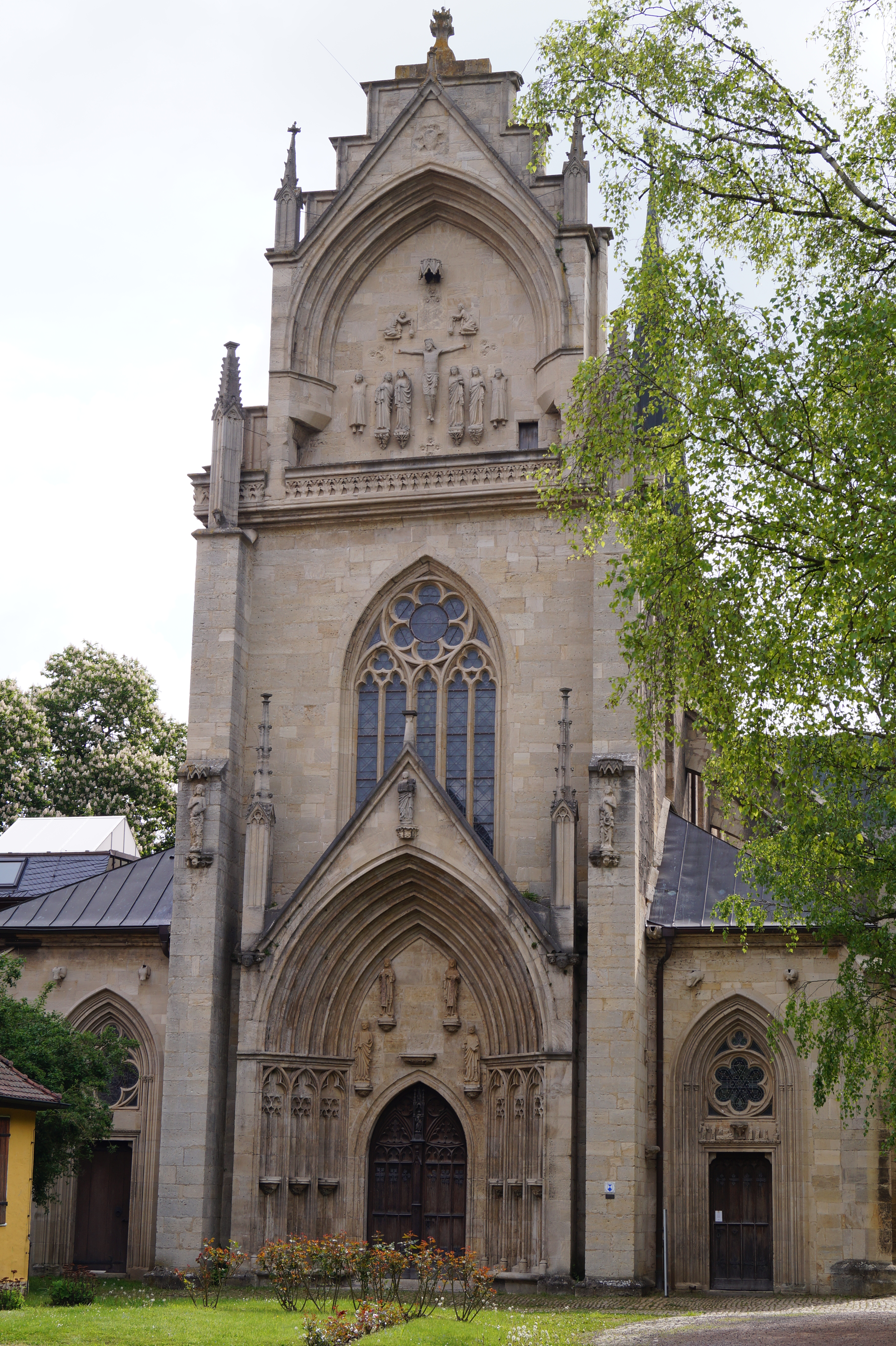
Facade of Monastery Pforta

The minster was built in the 1130s in the plain character of the Cistercians monasteries. In 1251, the Cistercians decided on an ambitious building project. Even though the new church building with its west façade was still ascetic in the interior decor, it clearly reflected the significant economic and political power of the monastery. The Gothic choir of the minster is the architectural example of the regional Gothic reception with French roots, transferring the latest shapes and forms inspired by French Gothic design and adapting them to local conditions. The glass paintings of the church, including in Europe's oldest Cistercian tracery rose window preserved almost completely together with its glazing, are an extraordinary treasure of medieval paintings.

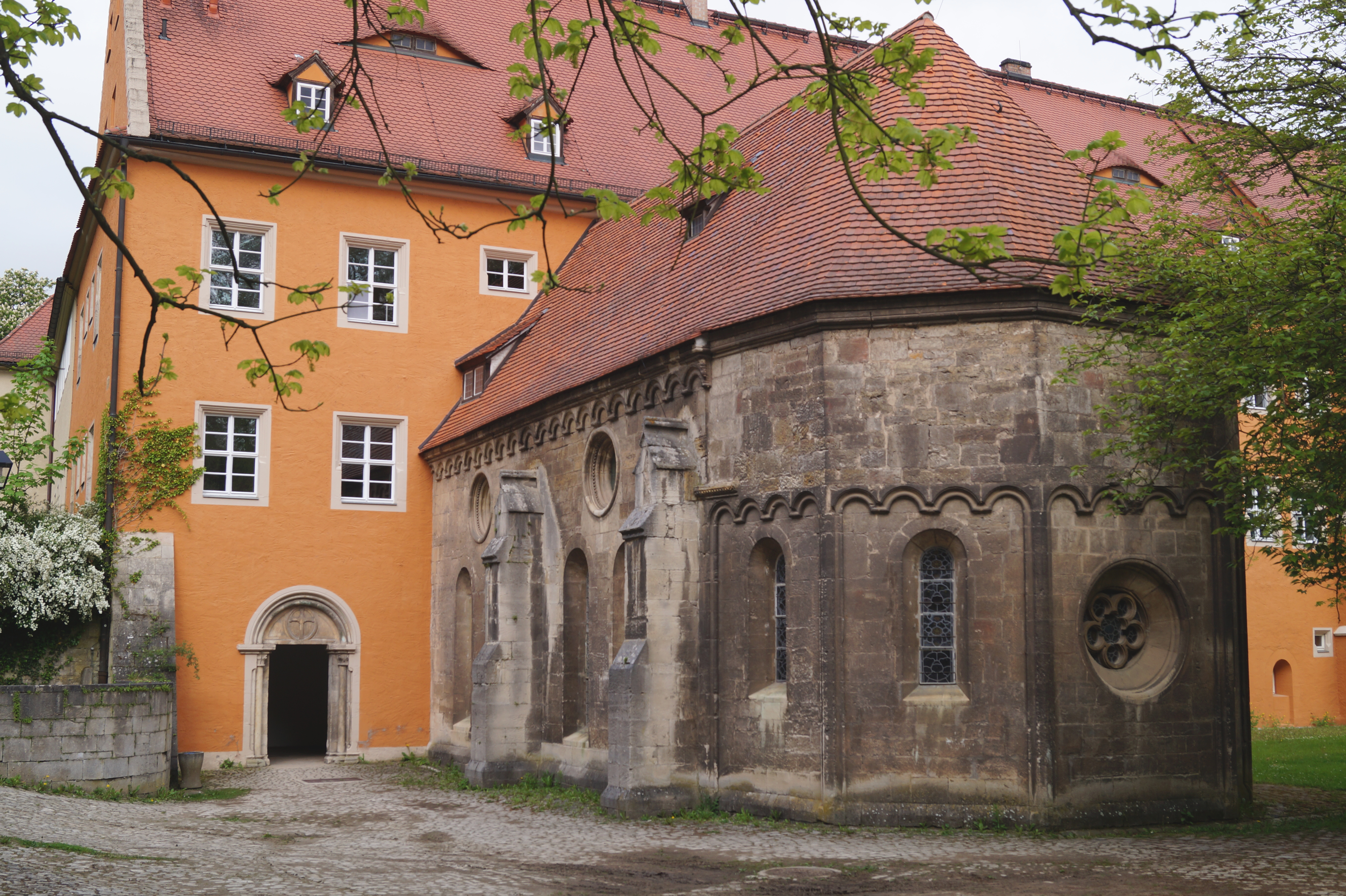
Chapel of Monastery Pforta

The so-called Abbot's Chapel (Abtskapelle) is considered to be an outstanding architectural example of the medieval infirmaries and nursing wards of the Cistercian monks. Before its conversion into an abbot's home, it had been part of the infirmary wing, allowing people to participate in the mass from there. Rare elements were found in the structure such as the latrine and the chamber of the infirmary.

==== Hydraulic system ====
In 1180, the Cistercian monks created the Romanesque mill race called "Kleine Saale" (Little Saale), a canal of 10 kilometers length. The mill inside the monastery is one of the most significant and oldest preserved functional buildings in Central Germany. The Benedictine monks of St George, the canons of St Moritz in Naumburg, and the Naumburg cathedral chapter participated in the costs and maintenance of the Kleine Saale in return for rights of utilization. Maintenance work was managed by a water expert from Pforta Monastery and the highest-ranking fisherman from the Naumburg. The Kleine Saale shows the Cistercian hydraulic engineering at that time.

==== Grange ====
The Romanesque House is an impressive piece of evidence of a former grange of Pforta Monastery that was constructed to ensure economic independence. They were run by bearded lay brothers (conversi). The foundation of those granges was made possible because many rulers assigned possessions in return for burial rights for family members on the monastery grounds. The Cistercians successfully sold agricultural and craft products on the markets in Halle, Naumburg, Jena and Erfurt. With even greater success, they managed to enlist parts of the peasant population into their service, offering the liege lords compensation payments for their release from personal bondage. As a result of its aggressive economic policy of establishing granges, Pforta acquired a charter in 1215 to transport carts and loads through the margraviates of Meissen and Lower Lusatia – and thus to Silesia – without being charged taxes or dues.

==== Winemaking ====
The Cistercian monks set about profitably using the land they had bought in a single-minded, well-planned and versatile way. Economic activities of the Cistercians included quarrying, the planting of vines on the slopes of the Saale and other suitable areas, the planting of orchards, the establishment of smithies, workshops for weaving, fur production and shoe-making, the setting-up of bakeries and cheese dairies as well as intense sheep rearing, grain growing, timber rafting and fishing. The Cistercians expanded their property from the Köppelberg vineyard, and created nine steep slope vineyards between 1195 and 1208. At the end of the Middle Ages, the monastery owned 58 vineyards between Bad Kösen and Roßbach. Cellar and wine masters at Pforta ensured high quality in winemaking, measuring it according to vinum bonum (1226), vinum melius (1289) or vinum terrestre (country wine, around 1340).

== History ==
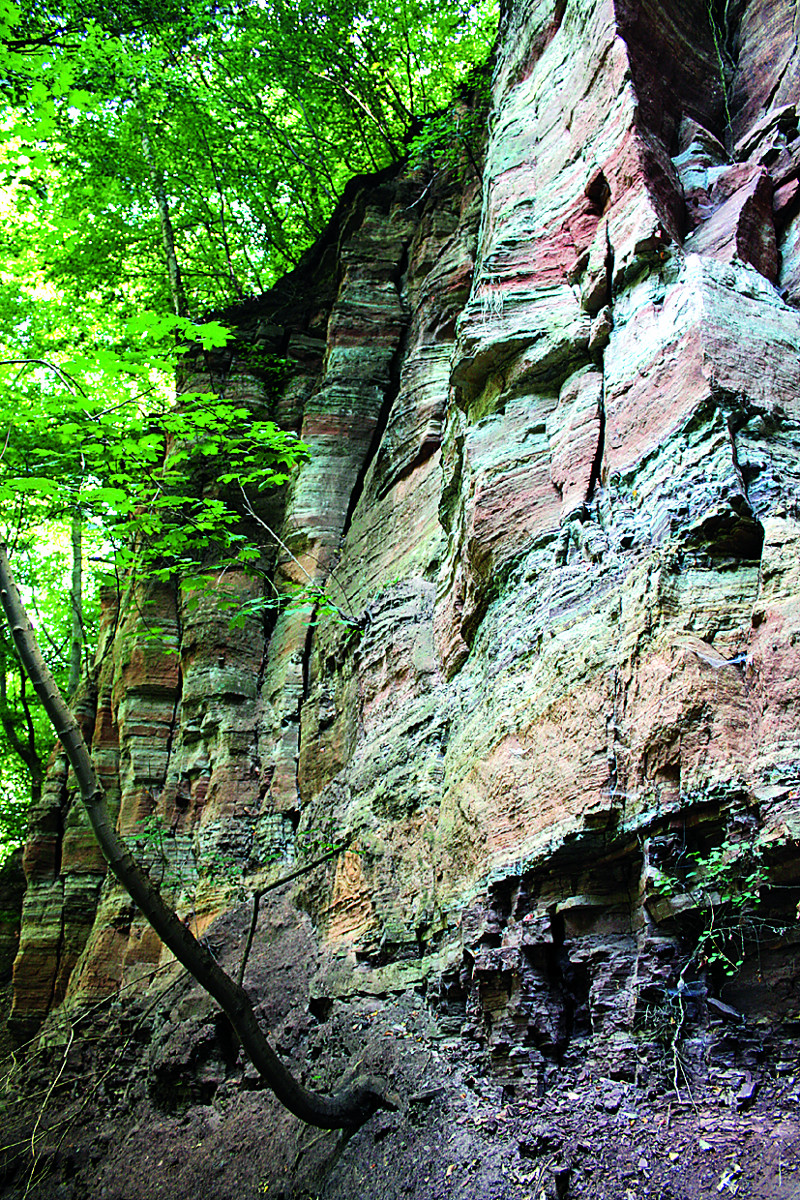
Sandstone, Saale-Unstrut

The area provided moderate climate, fertile soils, rich water sources and wood supply through forests and was populated by Stone Age hunters 380 000 years ago . From the Neolithic Age onwards throughout all prehistoric times, the area was settled.

=== The Early Middle Ages ===
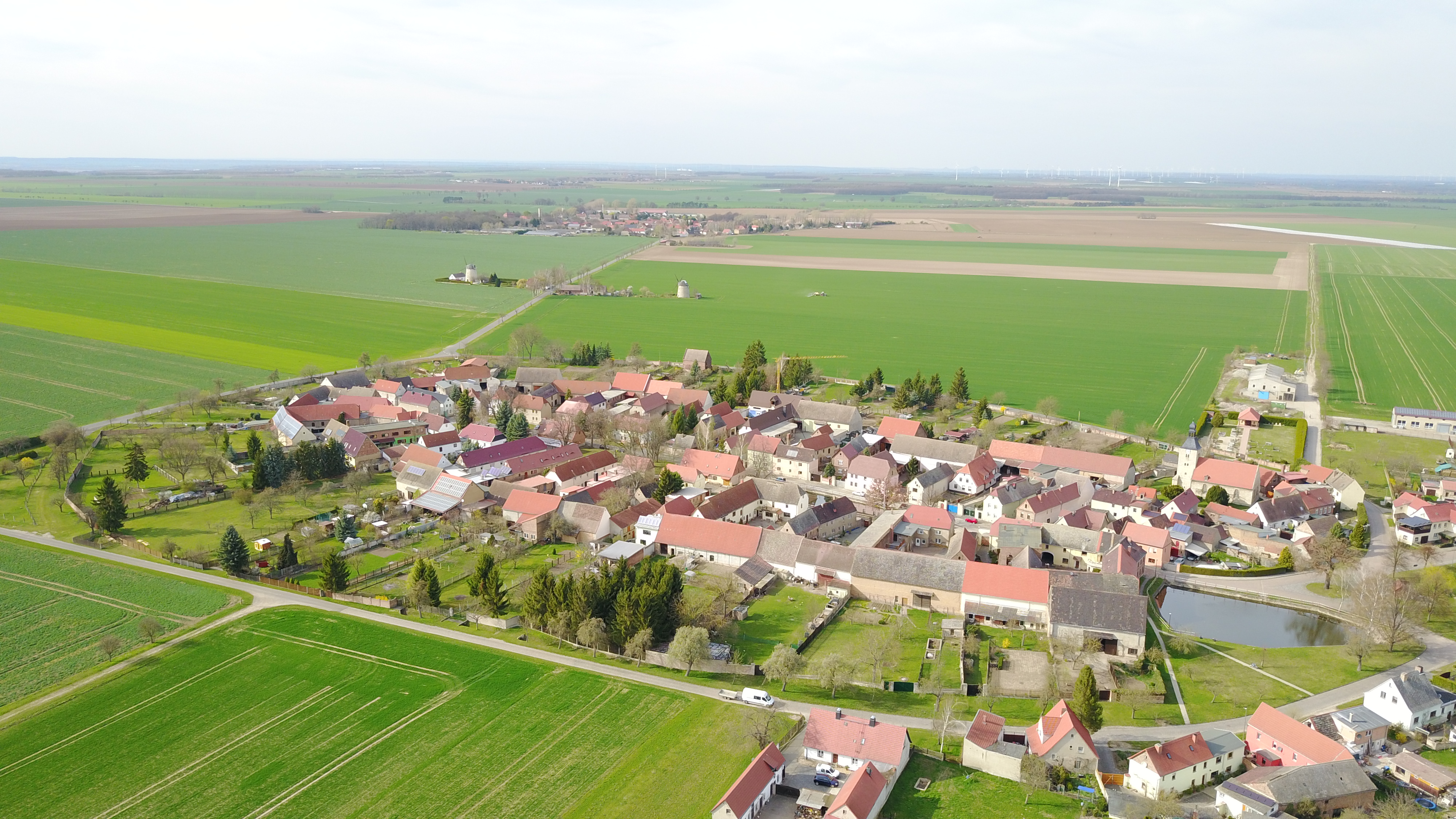
Ebersorda

The Migration Period brought decisive changes from 375 AD onwards and also had an influence on the Saale-Unstrut region. The local population, consisting of migrating Germanic Varini and Angles, merged to form the Thuringians. Following the defeat of the Thuringian army by Frankish troops in 531, the Merovingians as Frankish rulers settled groups of Frisians, Angles, Saxons and probably also Hessians to the south and north of the Unstrut in exchange for payment of tithes.
These settlers were met by Slav Sorb tribes originating from the region of the Dnieper, who came westward as far as the River Saale, crossed it repeatedly and beginning to settle on its western banks. The Sorbs had more than 50 civitates, meaning central strongholds with relating settlements. Such a fortified district or "Gau" developed on the site of today's town of Naumburg and was called "Wethau"; the centre was a Sorb castle complex in Wettaburg (now an urban district of Naumburg) . The region by the Saale and Unstrut rivers had thus become a sensitive border area because it marked the border between the peoples of Germanic and Slav origin and also the north-eastern border of Christianity in continental Europe.
In 766, a successful Frankish attack was launched against Wettaburg Castle, that was the headquarters of the Sorbs in the Saale-Unstrut region. The Frankish Empire was at its largest during the reign of Pippin's son Charlemagne (768 – 814). In a very bloody war lasting almost thirty years (772 – 804), the pagan Saxons were conquered and their territory was fully integrated into the Frankish Empire. As elsewhere, Christianization ran parallel to military subjugation in the Saxon area. The Saale remained the lasting natural border with the Slavic territories. In conjunction with the hinterland, the Saale was protected from possible attacks from the east by a chain of closely neighboring strongholds and fortifications, including the "Limes Sorabicus".
The territory of the Frankish Empire extended in the first quarter of the 9th century from the Iberian Peninsula in the west to the Elbe and Saale in the east, from the North Sea in the north to Central Italy in the south. Thus most of Christian Europe was united in Charlemagne's hands. However, Charlemagne's successors were not able to maintain Imperial unity.
In 919, Heinrich, the duke of Saxony, also known as Henry the Fowler, became king of the Franks and the Saxons. As a result, the Saale-Unstrut region moved from a peripheral position in the Frankish empire to the focus of political interest. Heinrich expanded his power along the eastern border of the Empire by conquering the Slav tribes (928/929) and defeating the Hungarians by the Unstrut in 933. As a result of Heinrich I's expansion policy and the conquest of the Slav tribes, the character of the area east of the Saale and Unstrut changed from a direct border area to a connecting region between the old settlement land to the west and the newly conquered regions by the Elbe.
With the consent of the Pope and the German Imperial bishops, the Emperor arranged for dioceses and bishop's churches to be established in Merseburg, Zeitz and Meissen in 968, forming a new church province for the eastern part of the Empire within the equally newly founded archbishopric of Magdeburg.

==== The High Middle Ages ====
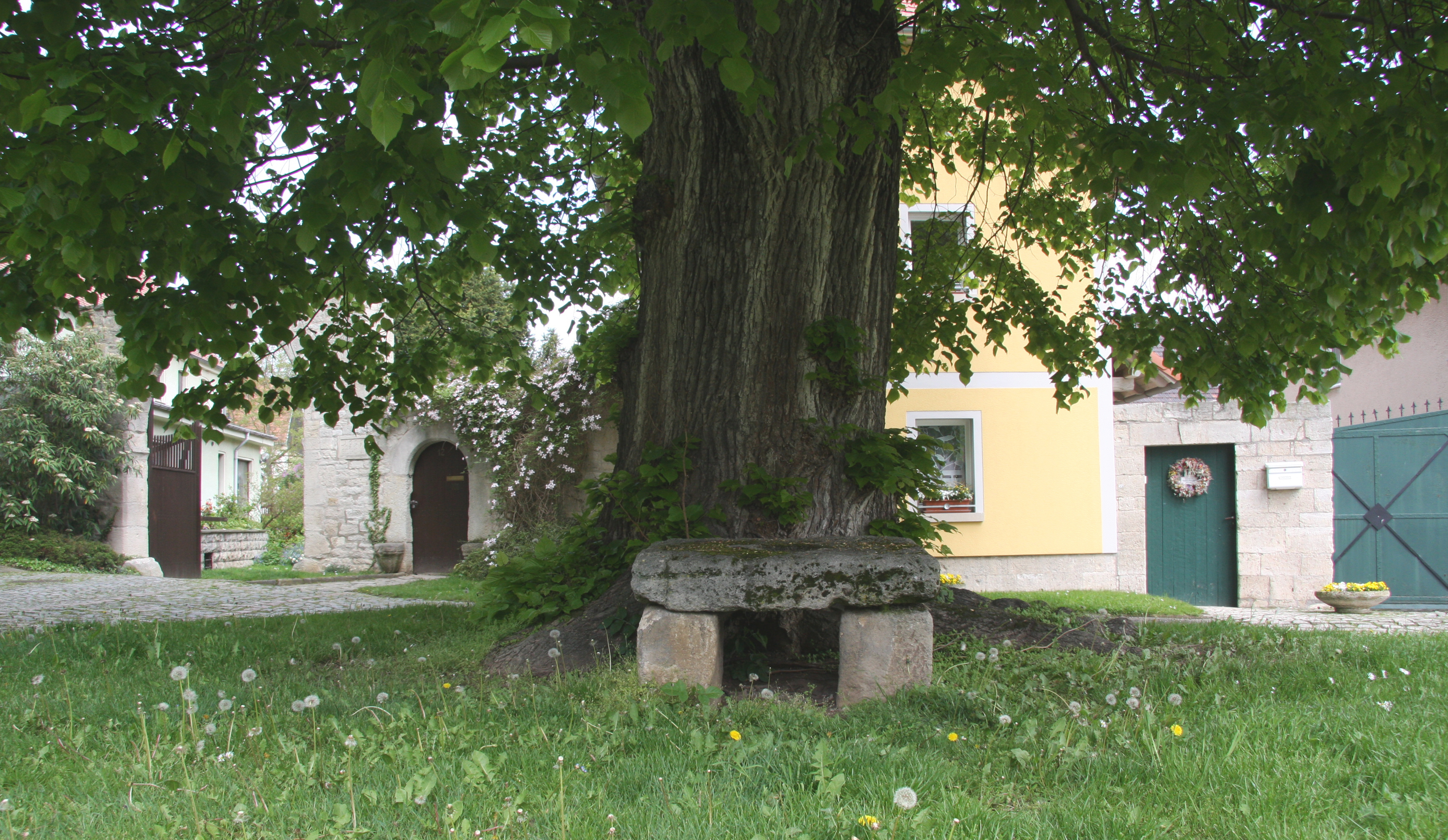
Schleberoda

From the 10th century onwards, the Ekkehardine dynasty gained influence in the Empire. Contemporaneous Bishop Thietmar of Merseburg described the first prominent representative of this house, Ekkehard I, as a person with an outstanding lack of humility "He was an ornament to the Empire, a treasure of the land, a hope for his subjects and a terror to his enemies and he would have been completely perfect if he had only been able to remain humble".
After the murder of the margrave Ekkehard I on 30 April 1002, Ekkehard's sons, Margrave Hermann (1009 – 1038) and Margrave Ekkehard II (1009 – 1046), assumed power in 1009. They became the most powerful rulers in the eastern part of the Empire and moved their family seat from Kleinjena to the "Neue Burg" (New Castle, Naumburg). The rise of Naumburg as ecclesiastical, political, cultural and economic centre of the Saale-Unstrut region had begun. In this context, it has to be emphasized that Sorb "Smurds" and German residents lived largely peacefully alongside each other.

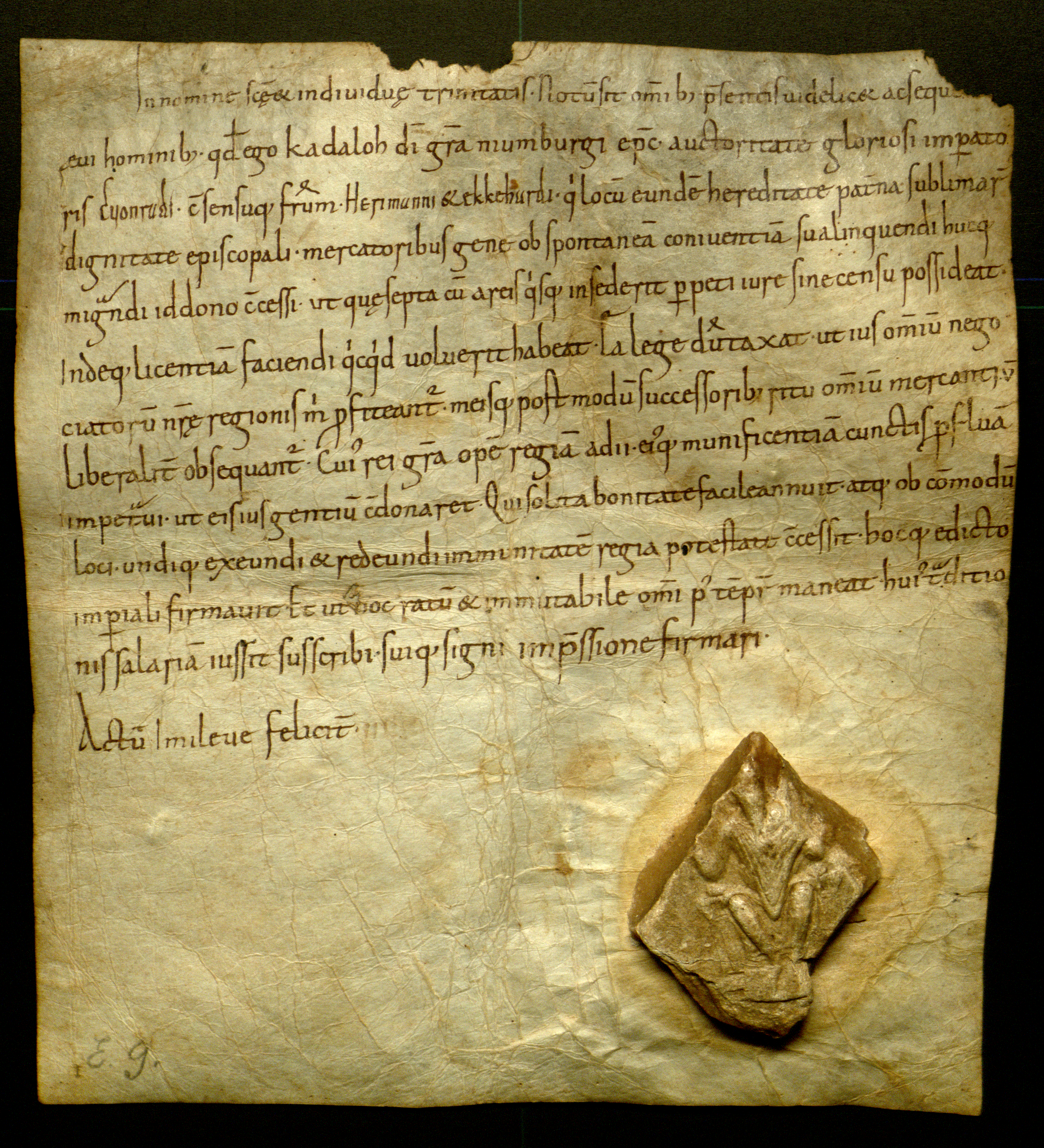
Certificate Emperor Conrad

The bishops of Naumburg, the landgraves of Thuringia and the margraves of Meissen as lords of the town of Naumburg promoted a systematic development of the city into the most important town in the Saale-Unstrut region. In March 1131, Bishop Udo I met the Cistercian abbot Bernard of Clairvaux at the Imperial Diet in Liège in March 1131, a meeting of central significance for the propagation of the Cistercian order in the Empire. As a result, a delegation of monks from the Walkenried Cistercian monastery moved to a location next to Naumburg in 1137/1138. The founding of the Cistercian Pforta Monastery contributed to the propagation of the Order on to Eastern Europe. One of the greatest achievements of Pforta Monastery was furthermore the settlement of peasants in these regions. This so-called "Landesausbau" in the High Middle Ages was supplemented by military protection of the positions already achieved. (Note: Due to increase of population, new public assignments of protection and administration for the diocese of Naumburg led to crucial changes in social structure. The prestige attained by the Naumburg bishop's seat is expressed by the construction of a new cathedral around 1210 during the period of office of Bishop Engelhard (1206 – 1242).)
For the Saale-Unstrut region, the Ludowingers were, together with the Wettin dynasty, the most influential aristocratic dynasty during the 12th and the 13th century. The Ludowingers created a princely court culture modeled to equal royal forms. The magnificent court of Count Palatine Hermann of Saxony (1181 – 1217) at Neuenburg Castle was an extremely important center of literary activities in the Empire.
The Wettins, with Margrave Heinrich the Illustrious (1221 – 1288), were appointed as margraves to the east of the Saale. They were able to expand their territories and achieved political dominance in the whole Central German region during the 13th century, creating most favorable conditions for their homelands in the Saale-Unstrut region. The cooperation of the Cistercians with the Wettin and Ludowinger dynasties contributed to the transfer of spiritual, cultural and technological knowledge into the areas intended for colonization. Nevertheless, the economic emphasis moved gradually towards the east during the Late Middle Ages, when the importance of the relatively young town of Leipzig outdid that of the old trade fair town of Naumburg.

=== From the late Middle Ages to the Present ===
Following the Reformation instigated by Martin Luther(1485 – 1546) in nearby Wittenberg, the Wettins and the region's nobility turned to Protestantism, promoting and funding the reformers. As a result of the alliance of Protestant rulers and spiritual leaders, the monasteries and religious establishments in Naumburg, Goseck, Zscheiplitz and Pforta were closed between 1533 and 1540 and their endowments and properties confiscated. Only the property rights held by the Naumburg Cathedral chapter remained untouched.

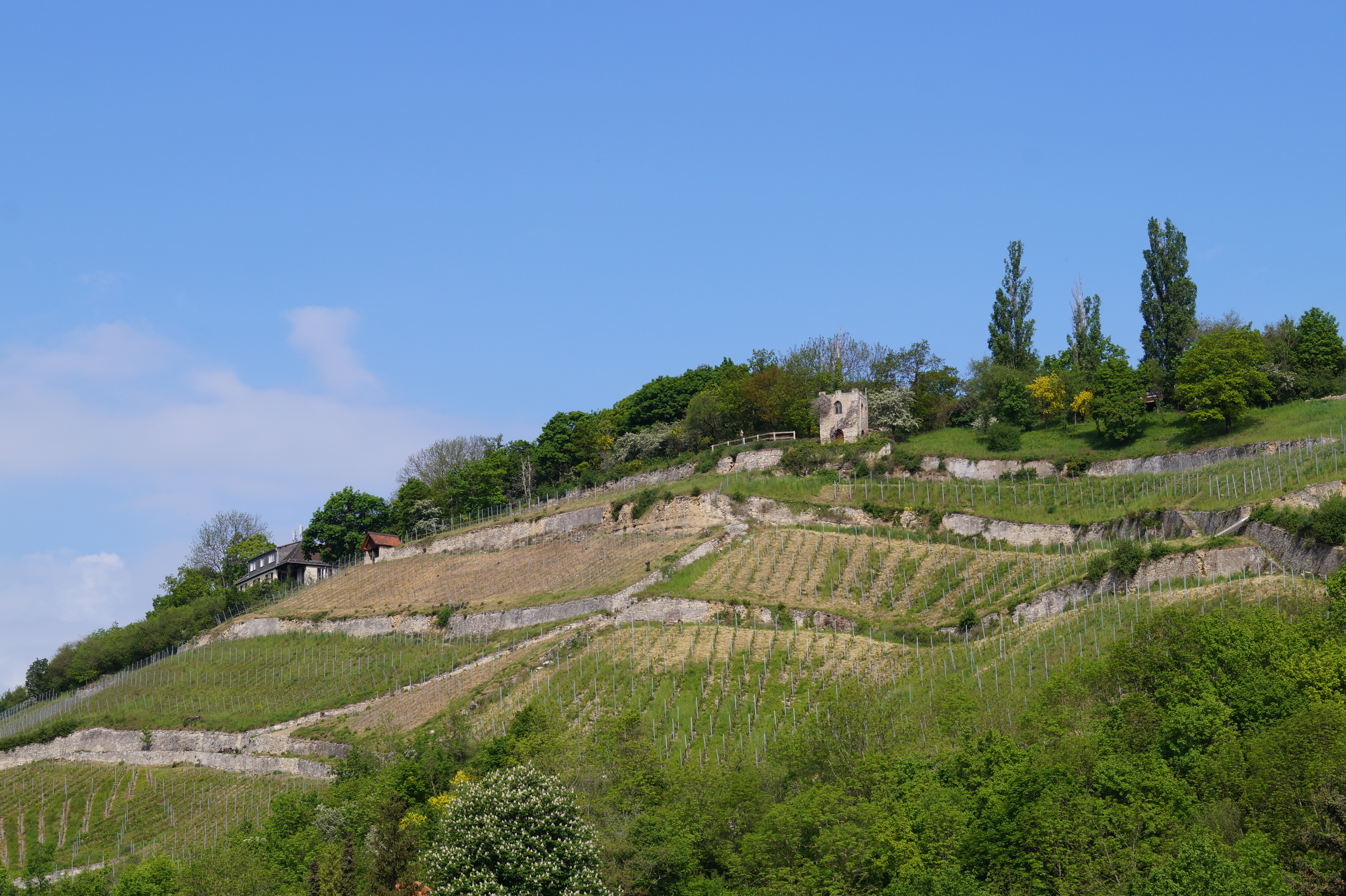
Vineyard Steinmeister

From the 18th century on, the castles along the Saale and Unstrut amidst their cultural landscape became prime subjects of romantic admiration. As a result of the Congress of Vienna, the kingdom of Saxony was forced to cede territories to the Prussian king in 1815. The landscape by the Saale and Unstrut now became part of the Prussian state until the end of the Second World War. Unlike many other regions, no drastic changes due to industrialization altered this landscape. It was due to Walter Hege's photographs published in 1925, that the founder figure of Uta became enormously popular but was exploited during the National Socialists' regime. The regime turned Neuenburg Castle into a training centre for senior leaders of the German Girls' Association (BDM) and the school at Pforta Monastery into a National Political Education Centre (NAPOLA) until the end of the regime.
The Saale-Unstrut region was spared destruction during the Second World War. The liberation by American troops in the spring of 1945 was followed in the summer of the same year by hand-over of the area to the Red Army and the Saale-Unstrut region thus became part of East Germany (GDR). There was no attempt in the Saale-Unstrut area to demolish old town quarters. After the reunification of the two German states in 1990 the well-preserved cultural landscape of the Saale-Unstrut region became part of the Federal State of Saxony-Anhalt.

== See also ==
- World Heritage Convention
- World Heritage Site
- World Heritage Committee
- High Middle Ages
- Cultural Landscape
