= Flemmingen =

- Location within Germany

General information
- Type: Village
- Location: Saxony-Anhalt, Germany
- Coordinates: 51°7′57″N 11°46′5″E

The village of Flemmingen is one of the eleven components of the cultural landscape Naumburg Cathedral and the High Medieval Cultural Landscape of the Rivers Saale and Unstrut that has been proposed by the Federal Republic of Germany for inscription in the List of World Heritage. The World Heritage nomination is representative for the processes that shaped the continent during the High Middle Ages between 1000 and 1300: Christianization, the so-called “Landesausbau” and the dynamics of cultural exchange and transfer characteristic for this very period.

== World Heritage nomination ==
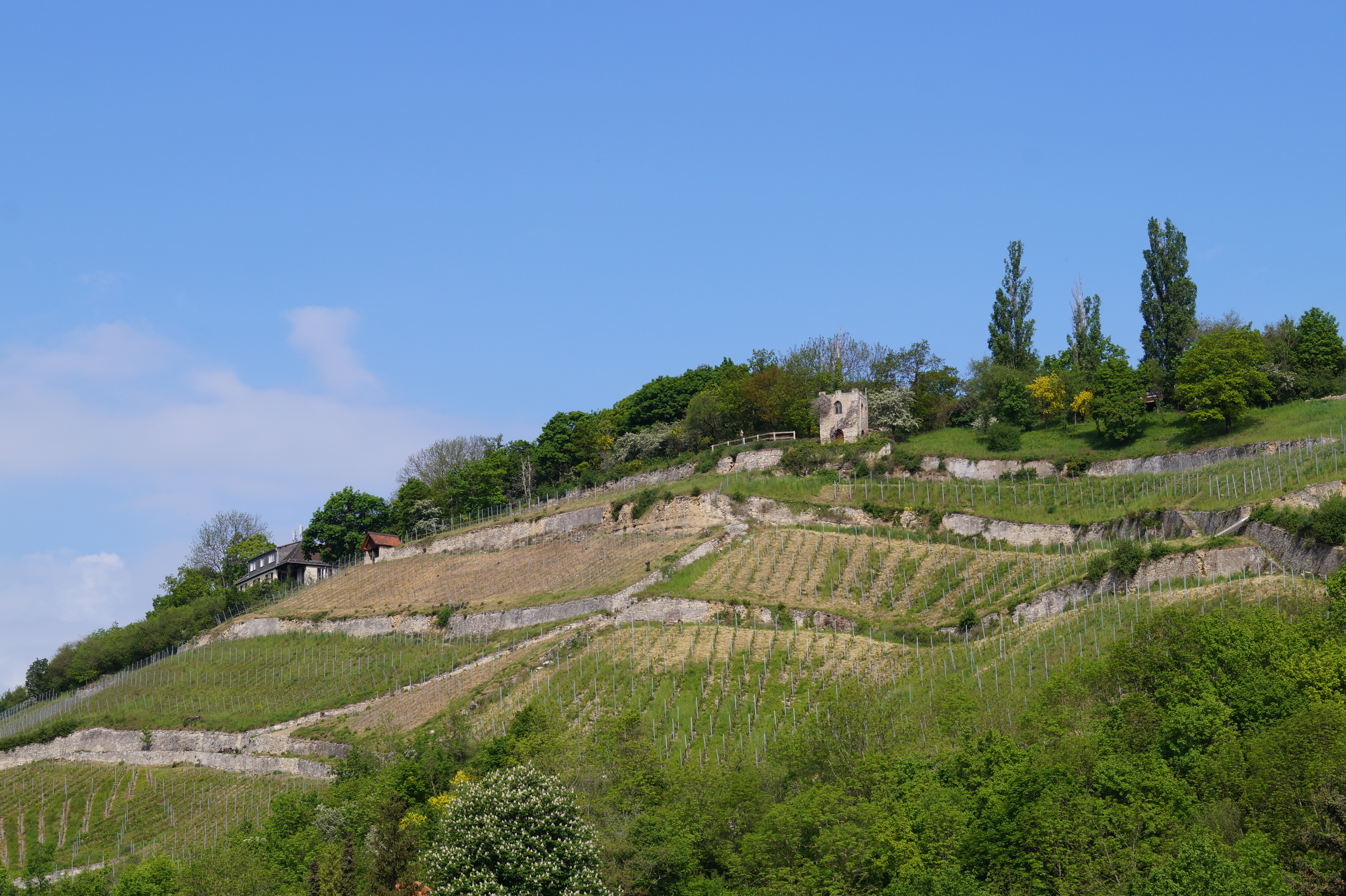
Vineyard Steinmeister

The Flemmingen village as part of the World Heritage nomination demonstrates the merging village structures in the German-Slav contact zone. (Note: The Förderverein Welterbe an Saale und Unstrut e.V. is the coordinating body for this nomination: http://www.naumburg-cathedral.de/.) The linear settlement was built on ground of an existing Sorbian village, Tribun. It is an example of the planned settlement of Flemish settlers in combination with an existing Slav settlement.

== Origin ==
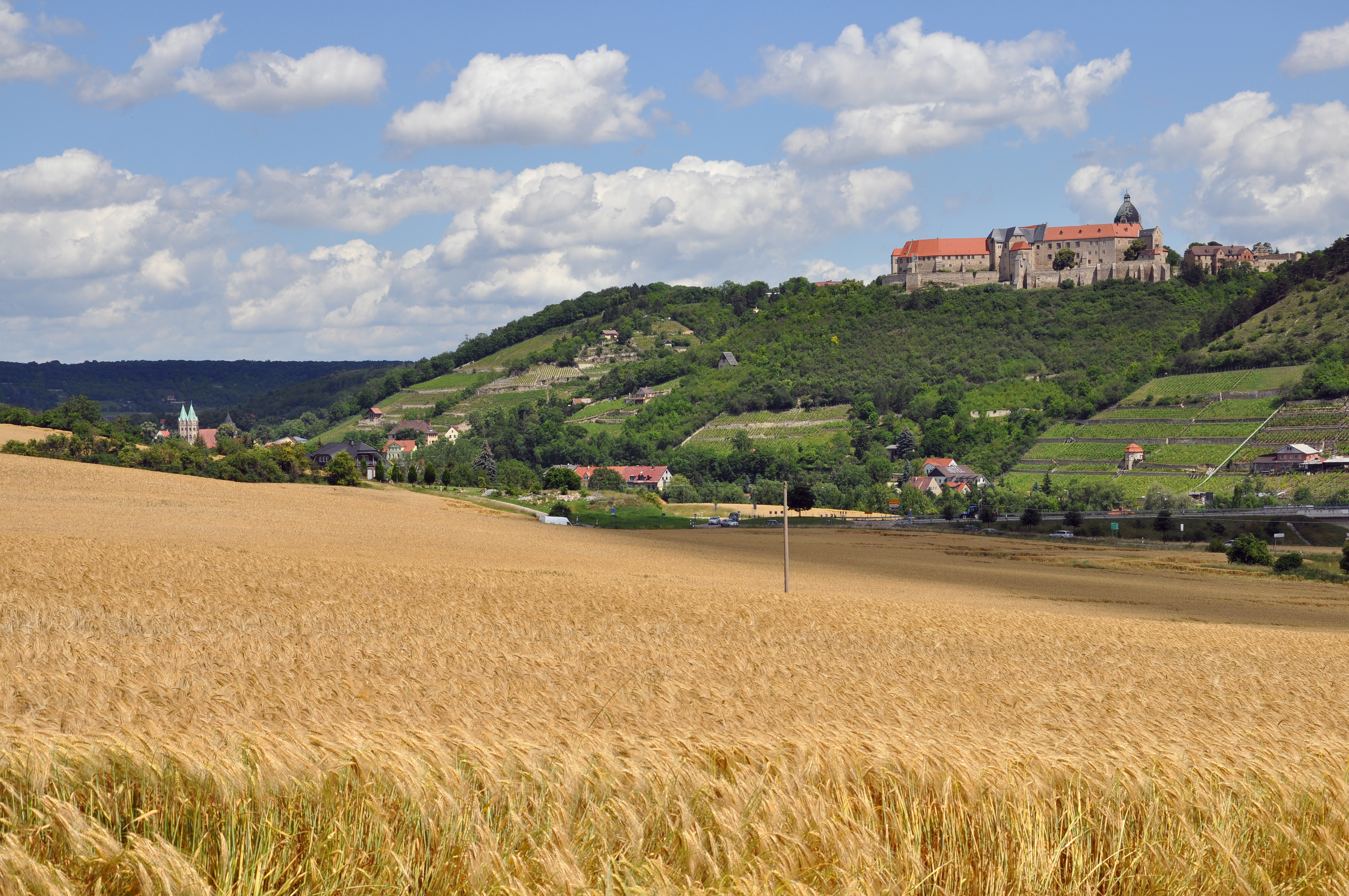
Landscape around Neuenburg

On the occasion of the Royal Assembly of Liège in 1131, Bishop Udo I of Naumburg (1125 – 1148) invited settlers from Flanders or the Netherlands to come and live in the Saale-Unstrut region. The respective place, named ″Flemmingen″ after the new settlers: ″The inhabitants of Flemmingen were called Holland, even though their residence was called Flemmingen, a name they most probably gave themselves to this place″. Flemmingen is documented for the first time in 1140. The village can be considered a paradigm of a settlement built by Flemish: The circular core of parcels around the parish church initially corresponded to the village centre of Tribun and was remodeled according to the new settlers’ requirements. Flemmingen consists of a horseshoe-shaped arrangement of farms in the centre, with tangentially to this a regular array of other farms in the manner of a ribbon village. The older Slav core settlement and the more recent Flemish colony can thus be clearly identified. The very regularly structured linear village with its narrow, rectangular farmsteads still bears rich testimony as distinctive features of this settlement type and its representativeness of the inland colonization phase.

== See also ==
- World Heritage Convention
- World Heritage Site
- World Heritage Committee
- High Middle Ages
- Cultural Landscape
