= Schleberoda =

- Stadtteil of Freyburg
- Interactive map of Schleberoda
- Location within Germany Location within Saxony-Anhalt
- Coordinates: 51°14′N 11°48′E
- Country: Germany
- State: Saxony-Anhalt
- District: Burgenlandkreis
- Town: Freyburg

Area
  - Total: 4.17 km^{2} (1.61 sq mi)
- Elevation: 161 m (528 ft)

Population (2006-12-31)
  - Total: 184
  - Density: 44.1/km^{2} (114/sq mi)
- Time zone: UTC+01:00 (CET)
  - Summer (DST): UTC+02:00 (CEST)
- Postal codes: 06632
- Dialling codes: 034464
- Website: www.freyburg-info.de

Schleberoda is a village and a former municipality in the Burgenlandkreis district, in Saxony-Anhalt, Germany. Since 1 July 2009, it has been part of the town Freyburg.

It has been proposed by Germany for inscription in the List of World Heritage. The World Heritage nomination Naumburg Cathedral and the High Medieval Cultural Landscape of the Rivers Saale and Unstrut is representative for the processes that shaped the continent during the High Middle Ages between 1000 and 1300: Christianization, the so-called Landesausbau and the dynamics of cultural exchange and transfer characteristic for this very period.

== Description ==
Schleberoda is located north of the Unstrut. It was founded as a result of intensive land development by clearance in the High Middle Ages such as other villages with ″root″ (Roda) in the name (e.g. Albersroda, Baumersorda, Schnellroda, Ebersroda and Schleberoda). The closely bordering local nobles in the area separated their territories using stone landmarks, as is still visible at the historic edges of the nearby woods, authentic landmarks which have been unchanged since the High Middle Ages: The clearance work and founding of new villages ran southwards from the original parish of Mücheln and ended at the Neue Göhle forest, which belonged to the territory of the Landgraves of Thuringia and could therefore not be cleared.
The forest Neue Göhle (Old Sorbian name gola = heath forest) has survived as a continuous, large forest complex. It was used for the production of pole wood in the context of winegrowing at a very early point in time, which is why it had been afforested in the form of coppice-with-standards. Stone landmarks, ditches, banks and paths are still visible at the historic edges of this woods separated the territories of the closely bordering local nobles in the area.

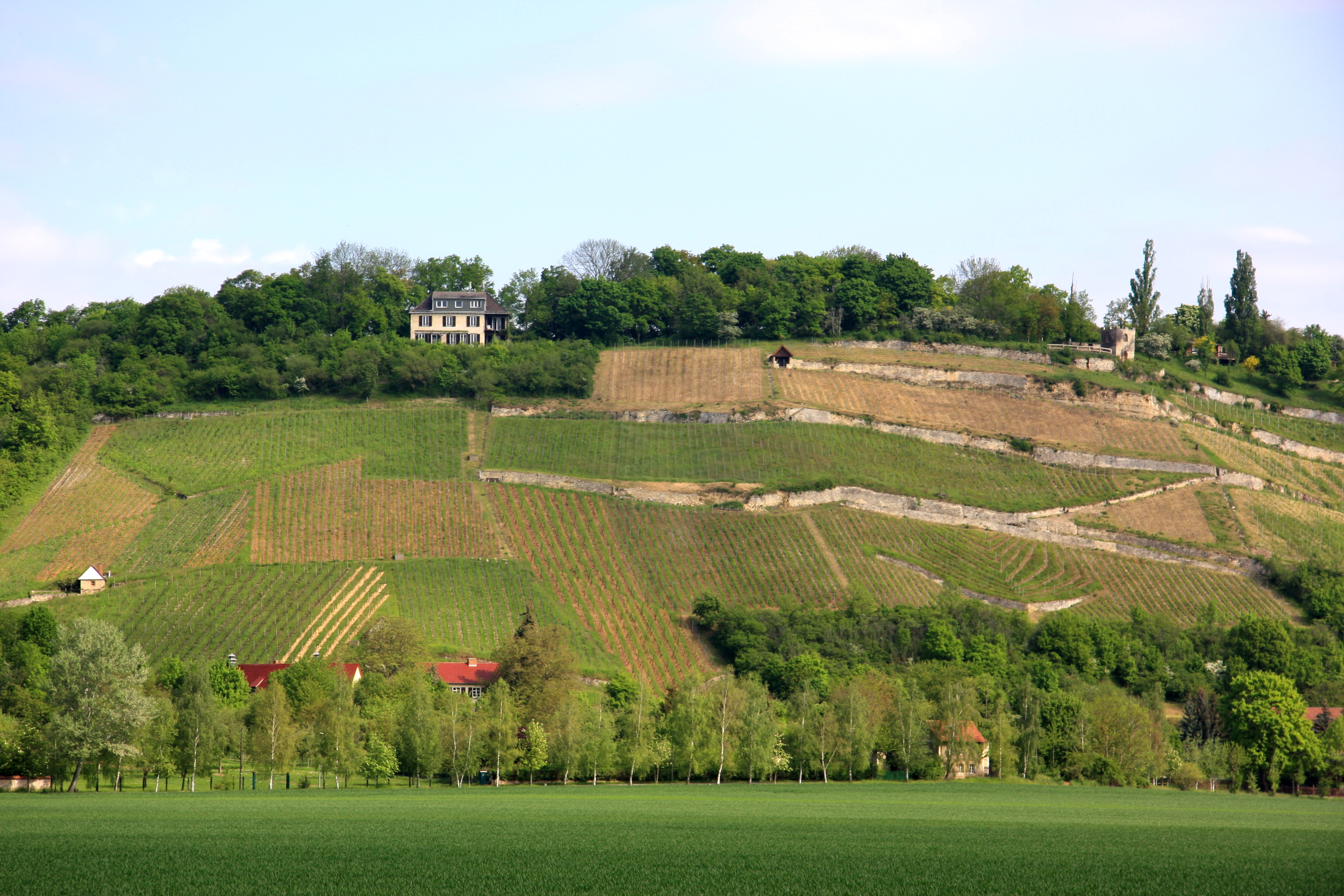
Steinmeister vineyard

== Today ==
Schleberoda has retained the structures and authentic form dating from the time of its foundation. It is an examples of the land development in the contact area between Germans and Slavs in the High Middle Ages. It has been able to retain its original ground plan as a radial round village dating from the High Middle Ages. Around the original village pond, serving for fire-fighting, and the bake house, replaced at the end of the 18th century, forward-gabled and side-gabled buildings are grouped, some made with packed loam, with high-quality portals dating from the 16th to 19th century. The position of the former gate to the compact village settlement is still identifiable today. Including the outer boundary of the official village area is not only identifiable by a circumferential path and has survived in its original form to the north-west in the shape of an impenetrable hedge. The Romanesque choir tower of the village church with coupled abat-sons has survived.

== See also ==
- World Heritage Convention
- World Heritage Site
- World Heritage Committee
- High Middle Ages
- Cultural landscape
