= Großwilsdorf =

Rödel
- Location within Germany

General information
- Type: Village and plateau
- Location: Saxony-Anhalt, Germany
- Coordinates: 51°12′56″N 11°45′18″E

The village of Großwilsdorf and the Rödel Plateau are situated in Saxony-Anhalt in the middle of Germany. It has been proposed by Germany as a World Heritage Site. The World Heritage nomination Naumburg Cathedral and the High Medieval Cultural Landscape of the Rivers Saale and Unstrut is representative for the processes that shaped the continent during the High Middle Ages between 1000 and 1300: Christianization, the so-called Landesausbau and the dynamics of cultural exchange and transfer characteristic for this very period.

== Description ==
=== Großwilsdorf ===
The farming community of Großwilsdorf is a village within the town of Naumburg. It is an example of a circular village structure in the Slav-German settlement. The entrance of the high medieval village was traditionally marked by a pond. This pond was kept for use as service water in everyday life and for fire fighting in cases of emergency. In the village of Großwilsdorf, you can also find a Romanesque choir tower church, which had been erected between the two high medieval settlement nucleuses of Großwilsdorf and Kleinwilsdorf and which has partly been preserved. The tombstones of the church were ornamented with engraved crosses and a stick-like image deemed to be a walking stick. Since medieval tombstones in places other than large cathedrals and minsters have rarely been preserved, the tombstones in Großwilsdorf can be considered special.

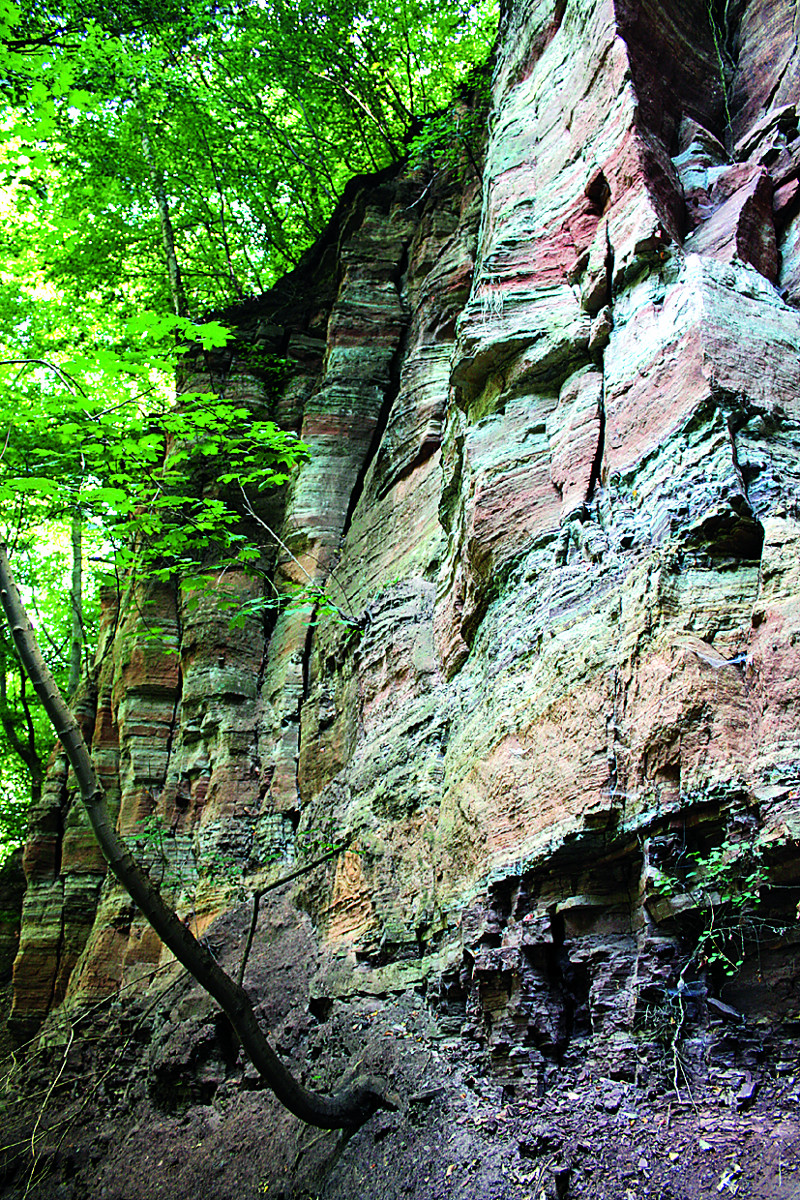
Sandstone, Saale-Unstrut

The villages of Großwilsdorf demonstrate the cultural exchange of neighboring settlers in the region, who all relied at first on their traditional settlement forms. Sorbs, Thuringians, and other groups created three individual round villages in the 12th century, that all shared the same village church built right in the middle between these settlements. During the High Middle Ages these settlers from different regions and ethnicities mixed and the villages grew together, forming nowaday Großwilsdorf. The layouts of houses and streets are still well preserved and dated to the High Middle Ages.

=== Rödel ===
Adjoining the village lies the Rödel Plateau with its porous limestone layers. The important limestone quarry “Rödel” served for producing large-sized cut stones of highest quality and supplied the Naumburg Cathedral with building material. Neuenburg Castle was almost entirely built using the local shell limestone. Structural elements of higher quality were made using shell limestone from the surrounding quarries. This quarry also is visible and unchanged until today, as are the transport paths for the limestone to Naumburg.

In the year 1032, King Conrad II gave the royal court of Balgstädt to the Cathedral of Naumburg, including all accessories such as rocks and cliffs (molis). The monastery was granted the permission to dig out suitable rock material there freely, to break it up, roll it out and carry it away. The great number of pits identified by way of laser scans clearly reflect that there was likely a multitude of entitled parties and producers because of the highly fragmented nature of medieval stone quarrying. Parcels could be identified in the forests on the Rödel Plateau.

== See also ==
- World Heritage Site
- World Heritage Committee
- High Middle Ages
- Cultural Landscape
