= Lay Tithes =

Lay tithes were a term for tithes that instead of going to the Catholic church, would go to a lay person This was either a form of rent to a landlord or, more controversially, ecclesiastical tithes that had been alienated from the parish or monastery that it had originally been intended for.
