= Saale-Unstrut =

Wine-producing region

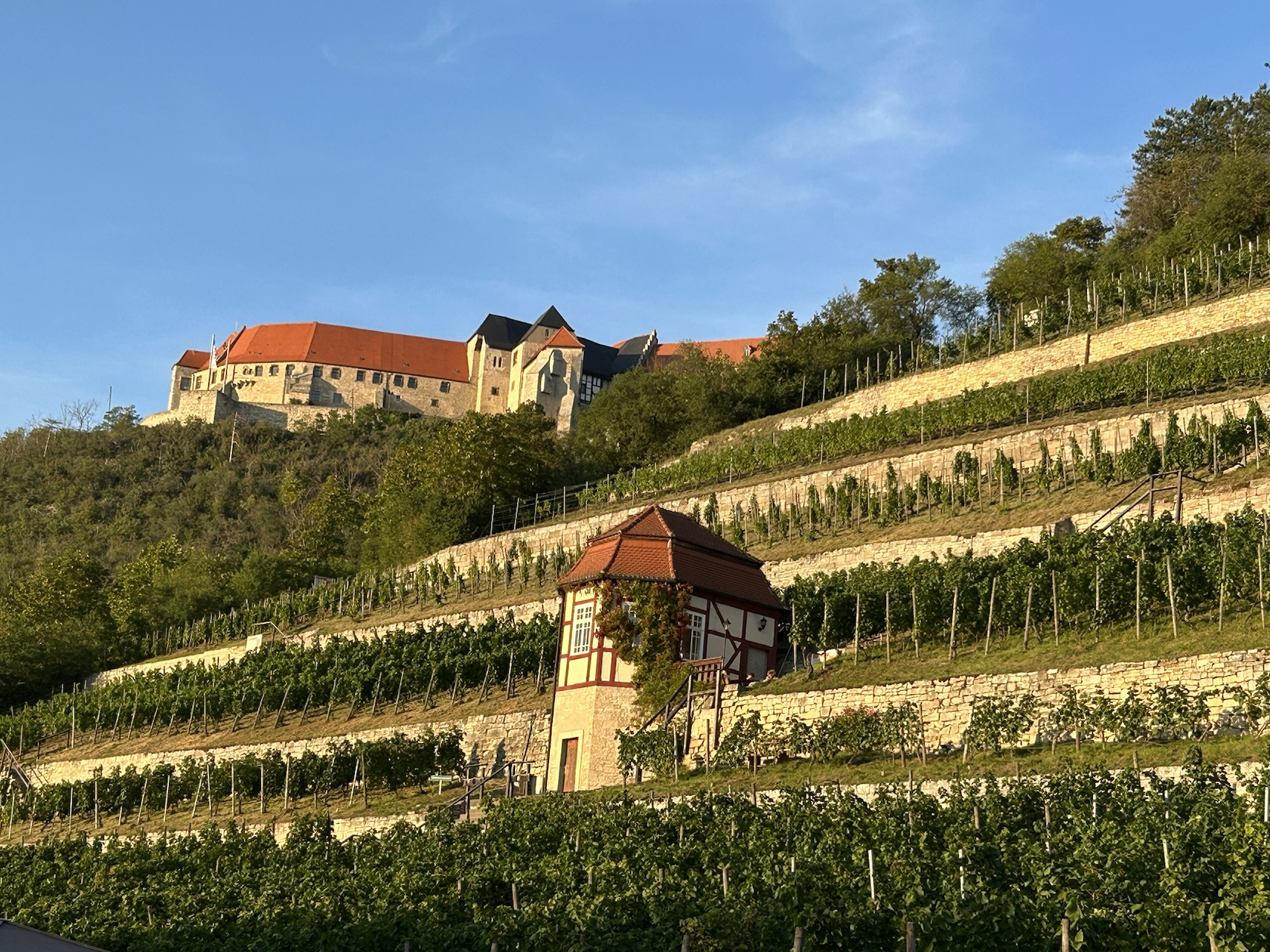
Vineyards at Freyburg.

Saale-Unstrut is a region (Anbaugebiet) for quality wine in Germany, and takes its name from the rivers Saale and Unstrut. The region is located on various hill slopes around these rivers. Most of the region's 685 hectares (1,690 acres) under vine in 2008 is situated in the federal state of Saxony-Anhalt, with around 20 hectares (49 acres) in the state of Thuringia.

== Geography and climate ==
Saale-Unstrut is the northernmost of Germany's wine regions, and is therefore one of Europe's northernmost traditional wine regions. The wines from the Memleben Abbey were mentioned in the literature already in the year 998 AD. Because of the cooler climate Spätlese or Auslese can be produced only in exceptionally warm years and yields are generally low.

The region in the district Burgenlandkreis has a wine route which was opened in 1993.

== Grape varieties ==
The most common grape varieties are the white varieties Müller-Thurgau, at 126 hectares (310 acres) and 18.4% of the vineyard surface in 2008 and Weißburgunder (Pinot blanc) at 12.1%. White grape varieties make up 74% of Saale-Unstrut's plantations. Varieties such as Müller-Thurgau and Silvaner, which elsewhere are considered to produce wines of more mediocre quality, are sometimes considered to give better wines in the cold climate such as Saale-Unstrut's. The wines are labelled varietally, as most German wines, and are generally vinified dry with a refreshing acidity, resulting from the cool growing conditions.

The most cultivated grape varieties, by area in 2008, were:

- Müller-Thurgau, 126 ha (18.4%)
- Weißer Burgunder, 83 ha (12.1%)
- Silvaner, 57 ha (8.3%)
- Riesling, 50 ha (7.3%)
- Dornfelder, 50 ha (7.3%)
- Blauer Portugieser, 46 ha (6.7%)
- Kerner, 45 ha (6.6%)
- Grauer Burgunder, 33 ha (4.8%)
- Bacchus, 32 ha (4.7%)
- Roter Traminer, 29 ha (4.2%)
- Spätburgunder, 27 ha (3.9%)
- Gutedel, 24 ha (3.5%)
- Regent, 19 ha (2.8%)
- Zweigelt, 19 ha (2.8%)
