= Nietzsche (disambiguation) =

Friedrich Nietzsche (1844–1900) was a German philologist and philosopher.

Nietzsche, or variations may also refer to:

== Academic ==
- Nietzsche-Archiv, an organization dedicated to the life and writings of Friedrich Nietzsche
- Nietzsche-Haus, Sils-Maria, a library dedicated to Friedrich Nietzsche

== Art and entertainment ==
- "Nietzsche", a song from the Dandy Warhols album Thirteen Tales from Urban Bohemia
- "Friedrich Nietzsche", a track from Klaus Schulze's 1978 album X
- Erik Nietzsche, the main character in The Early Years: Erik Nietzsche Part 1, a 2007 film directed by Jacob Thuesen

== Literature ==
- Nietzsche (Jünger book), a 1949 book by Friedrich Georg Jünger
- Nietzsche: Philosopher, Psychologist, Antichrist, a 1950 book by Walter Kaufmann
- Nietzsche: A Philosophical Biography, a 2000 book by Rüdiger Safranski

== Other uses ==
- Carl Ludwig Nietzsche (1813–1849), a Lutheran pastor and the father of Friedrich Nietzsche
- Elisabeth Förster-Nietzsche (1846–1935), sister of Friedrich Nietzsche
- Nietzsche-Haus, Naumburg, a museum dedicated to Friedrich Nietzsche

== See also ==
- Nitsche
- Nitzsche
- Nietsch (Nietzsch)
- Nitsch
- Nitzsch
- Nitschke (disambiguation)
- Nitzschke (Nietschke, Nietzschke)
- Nikisch, Nickisch, Niekisch, Nikusch
- Nicklisch
- Nikić
