= Nitzsch =

Nitzsch is a surname, and may refer to:

- Karl Ludwig Nitzsch (1751–1831), German theologian
  - His better–known son, Karl Immanuel Nitzsch (1787–1868), Lutheran church leader
    - Friedrich August Nitzsch (1832–1898), German theologian and son of Karl Immanuel
- Christian Ludwig Nitzsch (1782–1837), German zoologist
- Gregor Wilhelm Nitzsch (1790–1861), German classical scholar known chiefly for his writings on Homeric epic
- Karl Wilhelm Nitzsch (1818–1880), German historian, son of Gregor Wilhelm Nitzsch
- Elfriede von Nitzsch (1920–2011), German track and field athlete

== See also ==
- Tzsch
