= Nikiš =

Nikisch is a surname of Slavic origin (Nikiš, "little Nik(olaus)"). Notable people with the surname include:

- Amélie Nikisch (née Heussner; 1862–1938), Belgian actress and composer
- Artúr Nikisch (1855–1922), Hungarian conductor
  - Arthur Philipp Nikisch (1888–1968), German lawyer, son of Arthur (de)
  - Mitja Nikisch (1899–1936), German classical pianist, dance band leader, composer, son of Arthur
- Roy (Abelardo) Nikisch (born 1951), Croatian-Argentine Radical Civic Union senator
- Jan Jacek Nikisch (1910–1996), Polish advocate

== Niekisch ==
- Ernst Niekisch (1889–1967), prominent German exponent of National Bolshevism
- Manfred Niekisch (1951–2024), German biologist
- Wieland Niekisch (born 1957), German politician

== See also ==
- Niki (disambiguation)
- Nikić
- Nikšić
- Nikisha (< Nikita)
  - Nikishov
  - Nikishin (e.g. Bogdan Nikishin) (ru)
- Nikiszowiec
