= Naumburg =

Town in Saxony-Anhalt, Germany

- Town
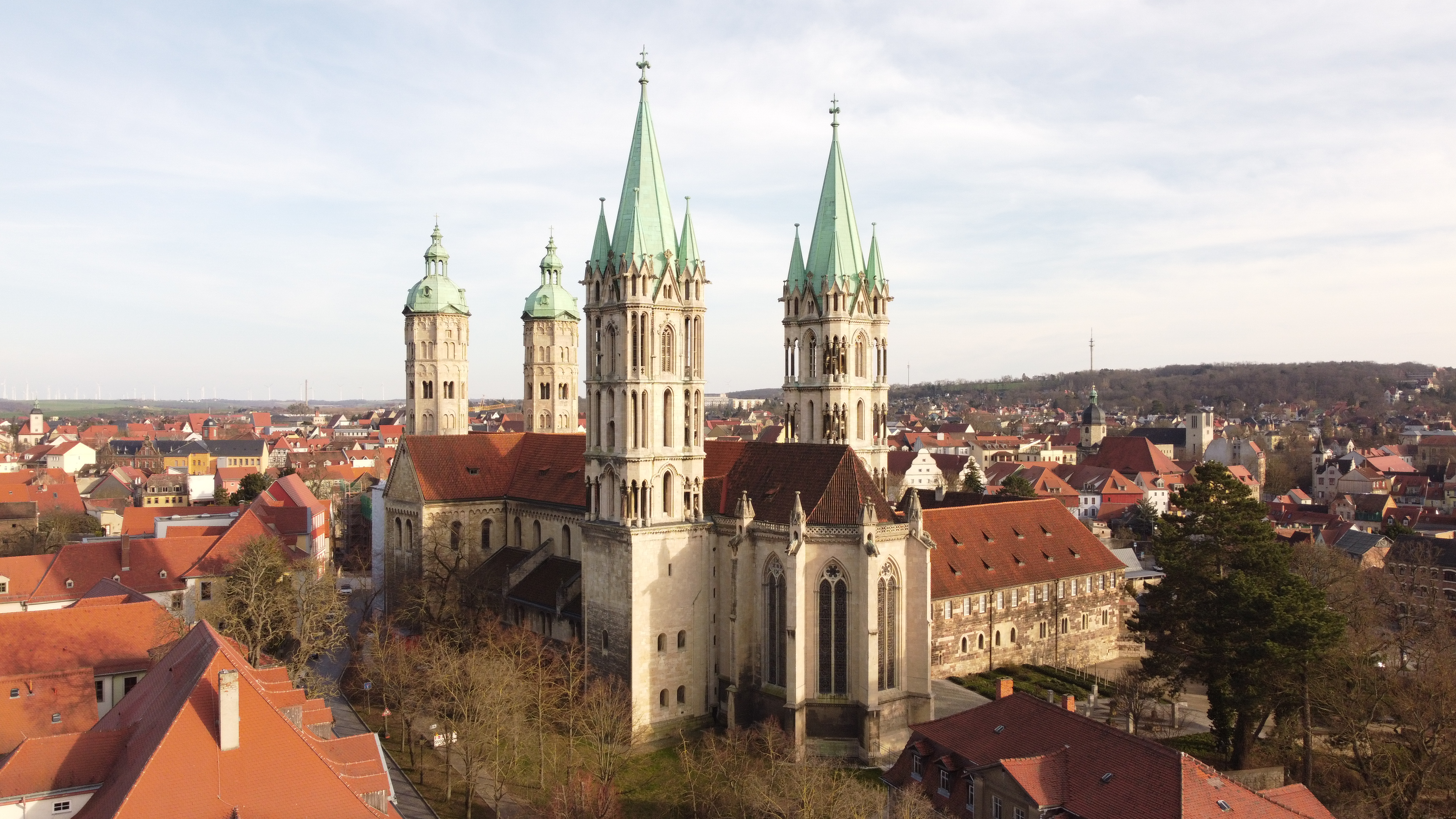
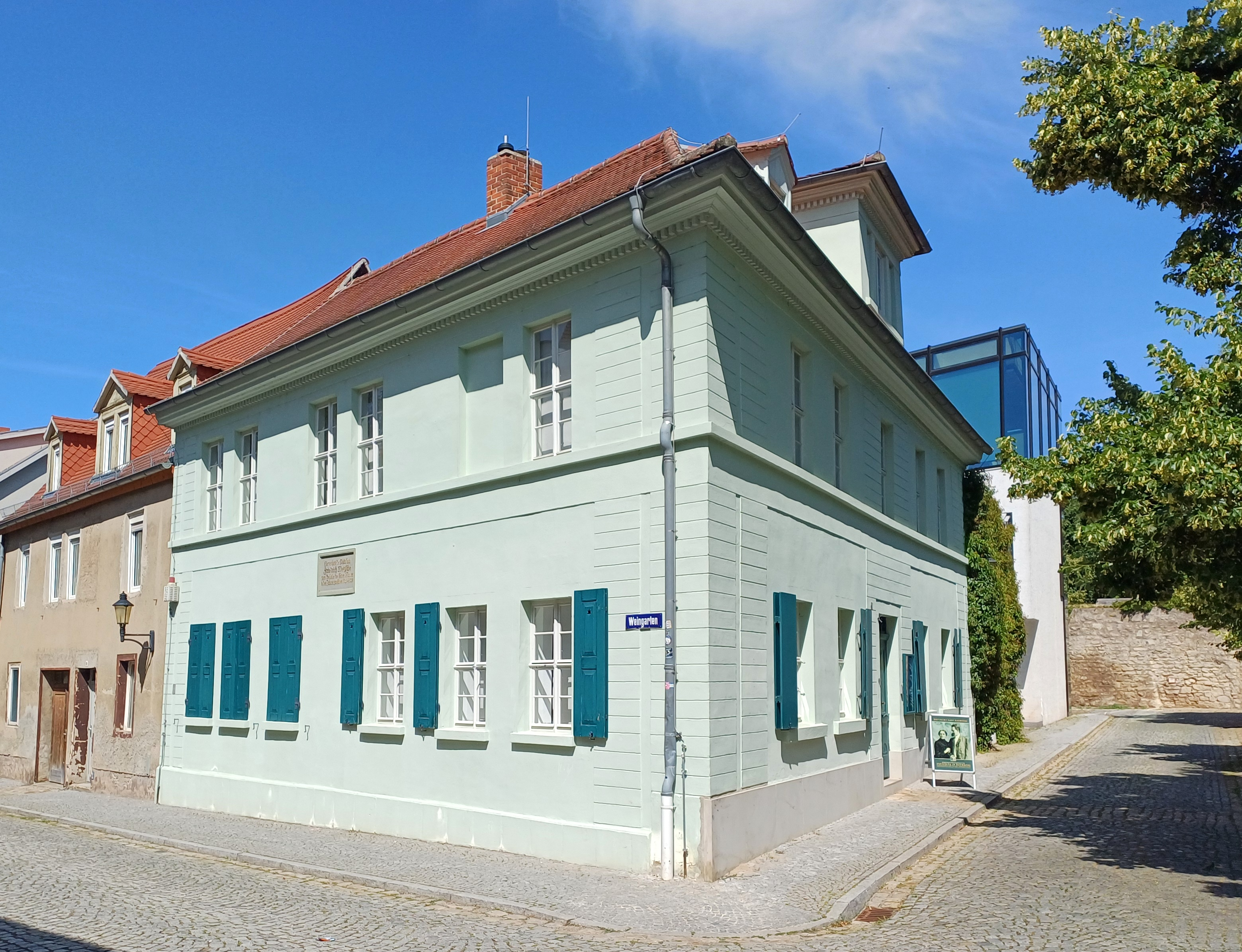
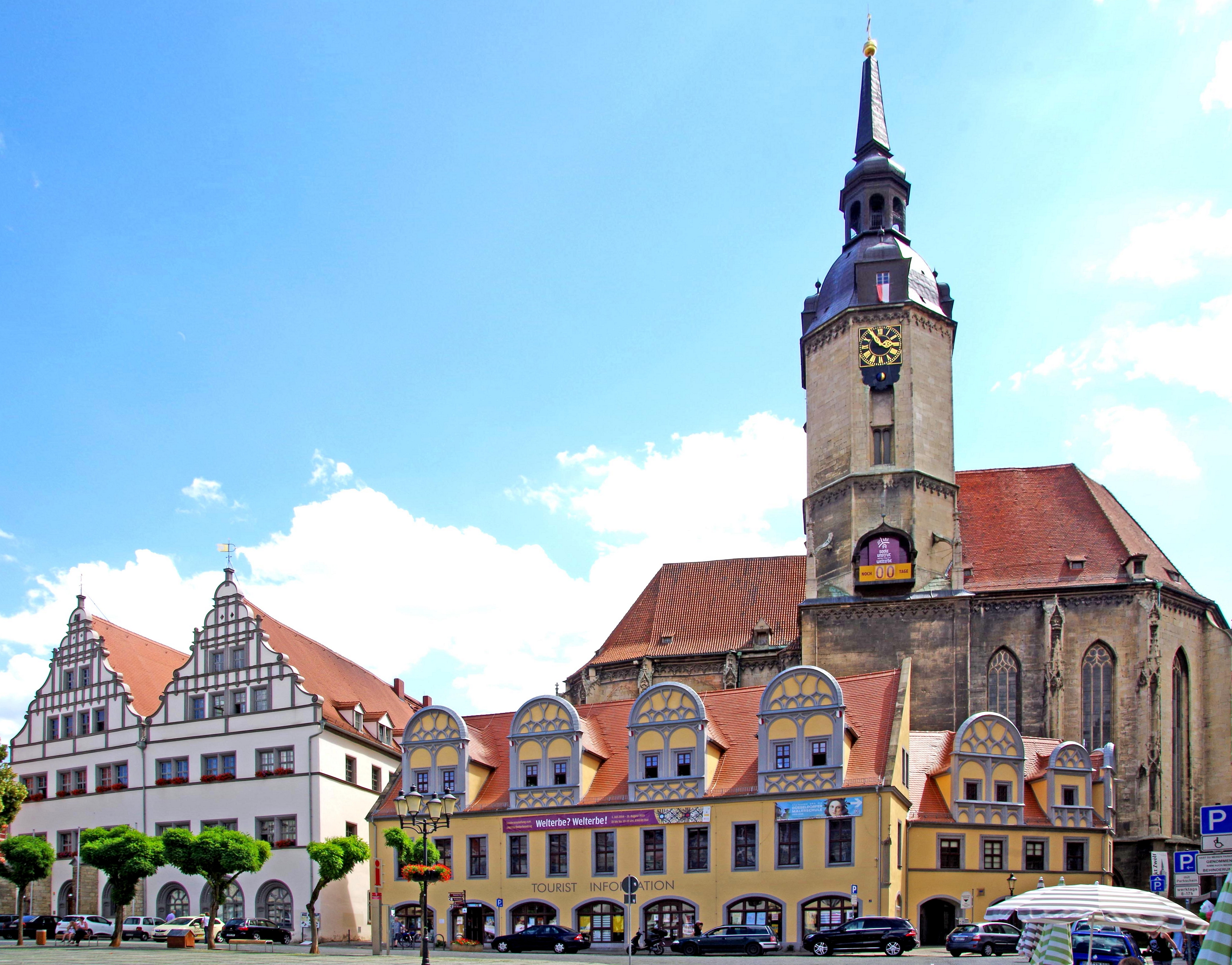
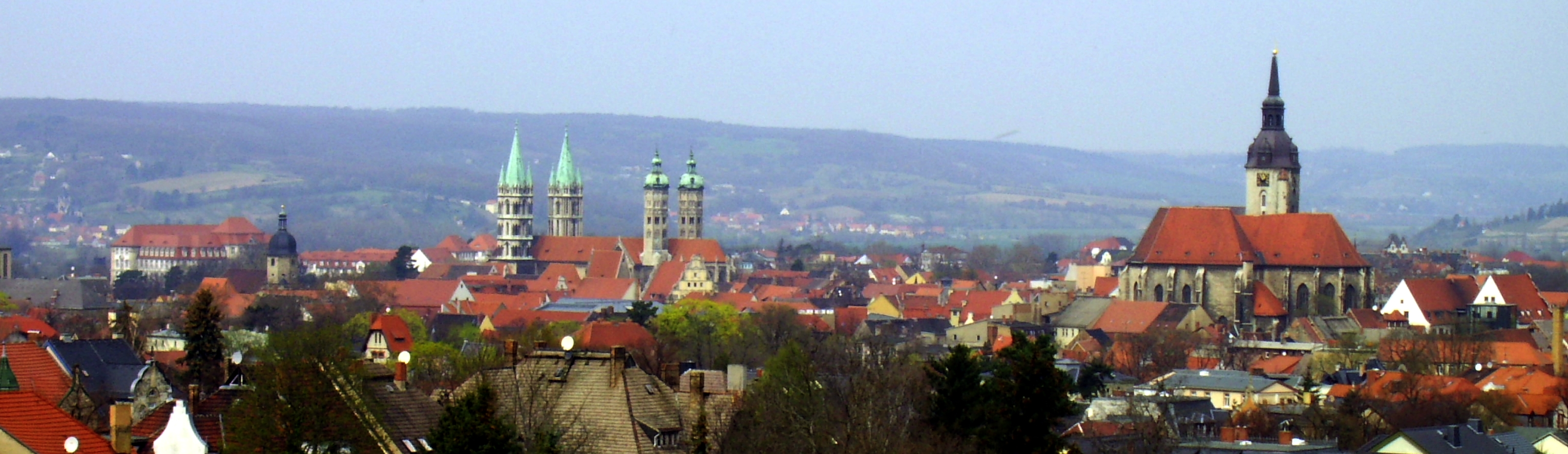
- Naumburg Cathedral, UNESCO World Heritage Site) Nietzsche-Haus, Naumburg Market square with church Panoramic view over Naumburg

- Coat of arms

- Location of Naumburg within Burgenlandkreis district
- Interactive map of Naumburg
- Location within Germany Location within Saxony-Anhalt
- Coordinates: 51°9′N 11°49′E
- Country: Germany
- State: Saxony-Anhalt
- District: Burgenlandkreis
- Subdivisions: 18

Government
  - Mayor (2021–28): Armin Müller (CDU)

Area
  - Total: 129.9 km^{2} (50.2 sq mi)
- Elevation: 130 m (430 ft)

Population (2025-12-31)
  - Total: 31,617
  - Density: 243.4/km^{2} (630.4/sq mi)
- Time zone: UTC+01:00 (CET)
  - Summer (DST): UTC+02:00 (CEST)
- Postal codes: 06618, 06628
- Dialling codes: 03445, 034466, 034463
- Vehicle registration: BLK
- Website: www.naumburg.de

Naumburg (German: [ˈnaʊmbʊɐ̯k]) is a town in (and the administrative capital of) the district Burgenlandkreis, in the state of Saxony-Anhalt, Central Germany. It has a population of around 33,000. The Naumburg Cathedral became a UNESCO World Heritage Site in 2018. This UNESCO designation recognizes the processes that shaped the European continent during the High Middle Ages between 1000 and 1300: Christianization, the so-called "Landesausbau" and the dynamics of cultural exchange and transfer characteristic for this very period.

== History ==
Naumburg and surroundings (around 1775)

The first written record of Naumburg dates from 1012, when it was mentioned as the new castle of the Ekkehardinger, the Margrave of Meissen. It was founded at the crossing of two trade-routes, Via Regia and the Regensburg Road. The successful foundation not long beforehand of a Propstei Church on the site of the later Naumburg Cathedral was mentioned in the Merseburg Bishops' Chronicles in 1021. In 1028 Pope John XIX gave his approval for the transfer of the bishopric from Zeitz to Naumburg. Until 1568, during the Reformation, Naumburg was the seat of the bishops. The last Catholic bishop was Julius von Pflug. The foundation of the cathedral school is dated to 1030. Naumburg has been known as a town since 1144.

Naumburg was a significant trading centre on the Via Regia in the Middle Ages, especially because of the Naumburg Trade Fairs, first known to have taken place in 1278. The emergence of Leipzig as a trade-fair centre from 1500 and the Thirty Years' War adversely affected the Naumburg economy.

In 1561, the Naumburg Diet recognized the unaltered Augsburg Confession and is recognized as part of the pre-history of the Book of Concord. The ecclesiastical domain was secularised in middle of the 16th century and transferred to the Dukes of Saxony, who administered the district through a government endowment (Stiftsregierung) and later provided administrators. After the fraternal agreement between the four brothers of John George I, Elector of Saxony, in 1657 the Naumburg district came into the possession of the secondogeniture of Saxe-Zeitz, which was inherited by Moritz, the youngest of the brothers.

Before the Moritzburg castle was built in nearby Zeitz, the city castle in Naumburg served as the residence of this line. This period came to an end with the death of the last Protestant representative of the Saxe-Zeitz line in the year 1718. The Naumburg district reverted to the Dukes of Saxony in Dresden and became fully integrated into Albertine Saxony. However, it remained until 1815 the seat of its own administrative authority (Consistory of the district of Naumburg-Zeitz). After the Congress of Vienna in 1815, Naumburg was ceded to the Kingdom of Prussia, becoming part of the Province of Saxony. It gained control over the cathedral and its close in 1832.

In 1846 the city was connected to the rail line from Halle to Erfurt, in 1889 to Artern and eventually in 1900 to Teuchern. On 15 September 1892 a steam tramway opened in Naumburg. From 2 January 1907 the Naumburg tramway was electrified.

Although industry was only weakly developed, a socialist club was founded in 1848. During the 1920 Kapp Putsch five workers were killed. The establishment of the local Communist Party followed in December 1920. From 1933–1945, Jewish residents of Naumberg were systematically rounded up and killed. There is a memorial plaques displaying their names. Under the German Democratic Republic Naumburg was a centre of mechanical engineering, pharmaceuticals, metal-working and footwear manufacture. It was also a garrison town for the Soviet Air Force. Unofficial estimates are that the number of Soviet military personnel approximately equalled that of the local population. The fall of communism in 1989 was accompanied by demonstrations and gatherings in the churches of the city.

== Geography ==
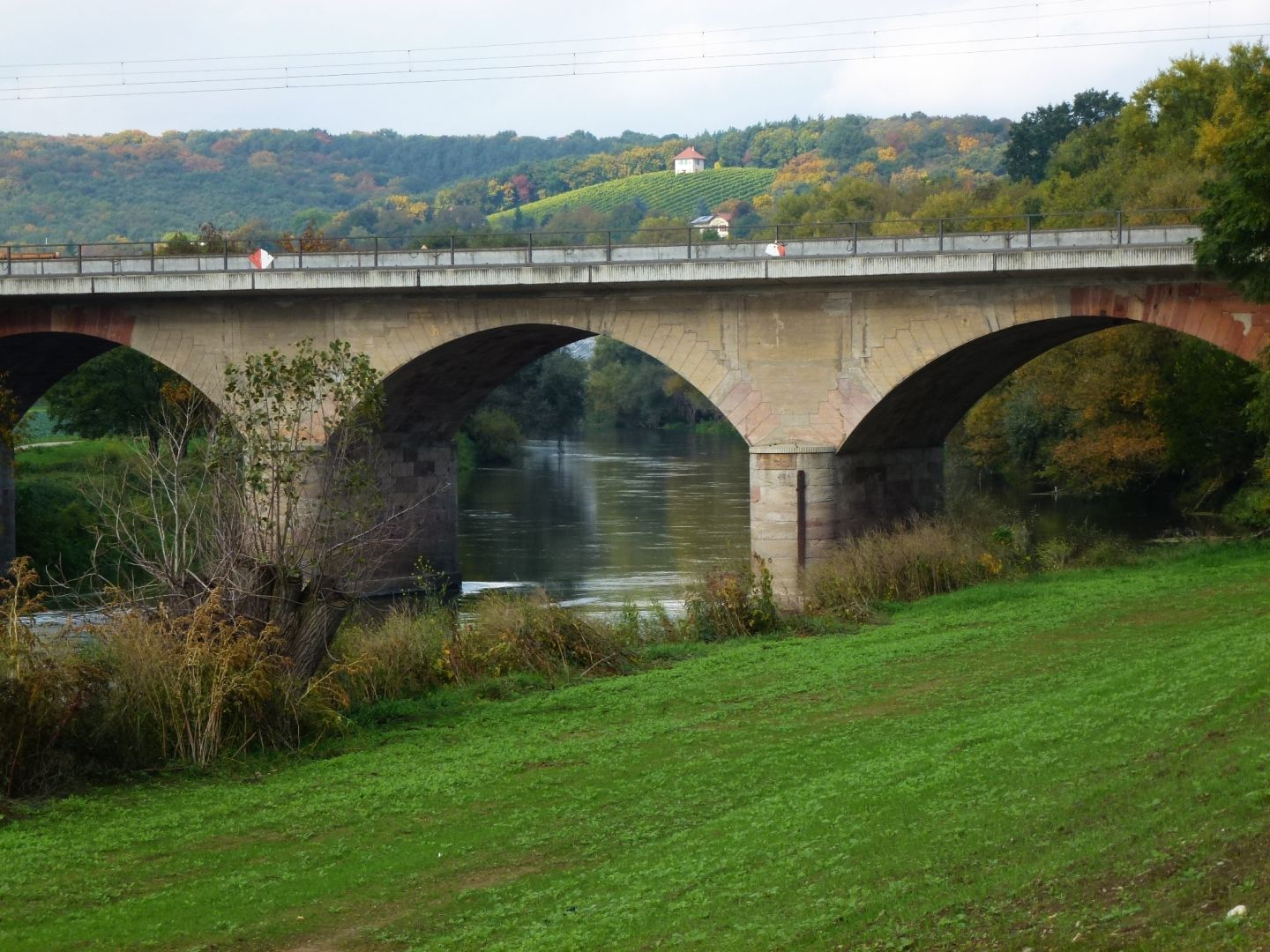
Railway bridge over the Saale at Naumburg

=== Location ===
Naumburg lies in the south of Saxony-Anhalt at the confluence of the Unstrut and the Saale near the border with Thuringia, approximately 60 km (37 mi) southwest of Leipzig, 50 km (31 mi) south-southwest of Halle, and 40 km (25 mi) north-northeast of Jena.

To the town itself belong the quarters of Almrich (formerly Altenburg), Grochlitz, Henne and Weinberge. In addition, the borough of Naumburg consists of the following villages:

Village/Quarter	Population (May 2010)	Year of incorporation
Naumburg (town)	24,886	—
Bad Kösen	3,839	2010
Beuditz	85	1991
Boblas	181	1991
Crölpa-Löbschütz	169	2010
Eulau	451	1991
Flemmingen	507	1992
Fränkenau	125	2010
Freiroda	124	2010
Großjena	526	1994
Großwilsdorf	133	1994
Hassenhausen	341	1992 (Kösen); 2010
Heiligenkreuz	183	2010
Janisroda	162	2010
Kleinheringen	79	2010
Kleinjena	282	1991
Kreipitzsch	58	2010

Village/Quarter	Population (May 2010)	Year of incorporation
Kukulau	58	2010
Meyhen	191	1991
Neidschütz	253	1991
Neuflemmingen	31	1992
Neujanisroda	44	2010
Prießnitz	309	2010
Punschrau	177	2010
Rödigen	23	1991 (Kösen); 2010
Roßbach	312	1991
Saaleck	229	2010
Schellsitz	211	1950
Schieben	75	2010
Schulpforte	147	2010
Tultewitz	60	2010
Wettaburg	103	1991

=== Climate ===
Naumburg has a mild climate with warm summers and cool winters that is relatively dry for German standards.

Climate data for naumburg 1992-2013
Month	Jan	Feb	Mar	Apr	May	Jun	Jul	Aug	Sep	Oct	Nov	Dec	Year
Record high °C (°F)	16 (61)	19 (66)	24 (75)	30 (86)	33 (91)	34 (93)	37 (99)	37 (99)	33 (91)	26 (79)	19 (66)	16 (61)	37 (99)
Mean daily maximum °C (°F)	3 (37)	5 (41)	8 (46)	14 (57)	18 (64)	22 (72)	24 (75)	24 (75)	19 (66)	14 (57)	7 (45)	3 (37)	13 (56)
Mean daily minimum °C (°F)	−1 (30)	−1 (30)	2 (36)	5 (41)	9 (48)	12 (54)	14 (57)	14 (57)	9 (48)	6 (43)	2 (36)	−1 (30)	6 (43)
Record low °C (°F)	−20 (−4)	−21 (−6)	−13 (9)	−6 (21)	0 (32)	4 (39)	7 (45)	5 (41)	1 (34)	−6 (21)	−11 (12)	−19 (−2)	−21 (−6)
Average precipitation mm (inches)	27 (1.1)	25 (1.0)	34 (1.3)	31 (1.2)	57 (2.2)	59 (2.3)	75 (3.0)	54 (2.1)	54 (2.1)	34 (1.3)	45 (1.8)	40 (1.6)	535 (21.1)
Source 1: Pogoda.ru.net
Source 2: Weatherbase (sun only)

== Demographics ==
Population levels:

- 1300 - c. 3,000
- 1755 - 6,987
- 1840 - 12,674
- 1875 - 16,258
- 1880 - 17,868
- 1890 - 19,807
- 1925 - 29,337
- 1933 - 31,427
- 1939 - 36,940
- 1946 - 41,379 ^{1}
- 1950 - 40,595 ^{2}
- 1960 - 37,377
- 1981 - 33,585
- 1984 - 32,610
- 1990 - 32,583
- 1995 - 30,867
- 1997 - 30,530
- 2000 - 30,399
- 2001 - 30,388
- 2002 - 30,279
- 2003 - 29,933
- 2004 - 29,927
- 2006 - 29,521 ^{3}
- 2009 - 28,259

1: 29. October
2: 31. August
3: 30. June

== Attractions ==
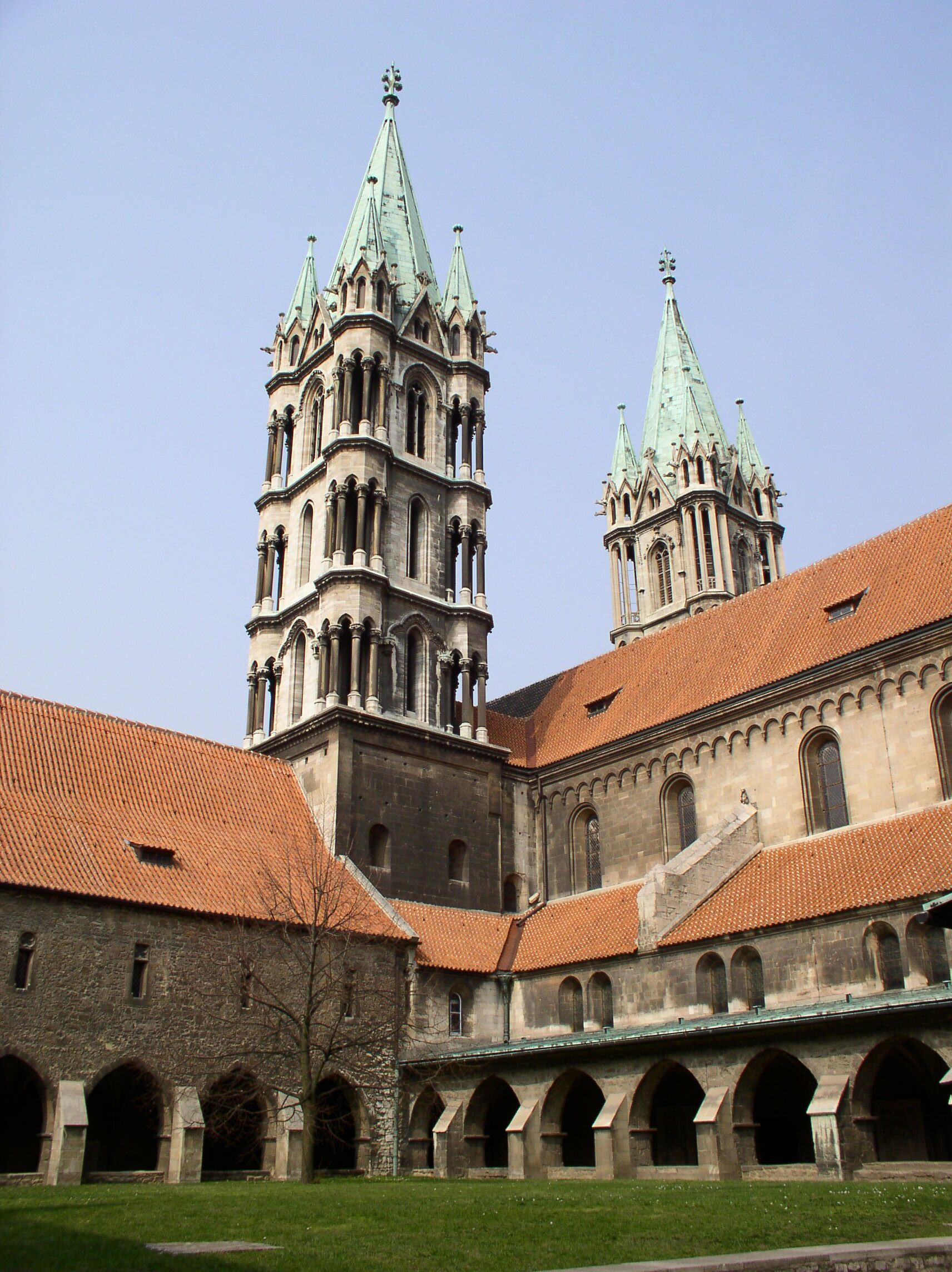
St. Peter and Paul Cathedral

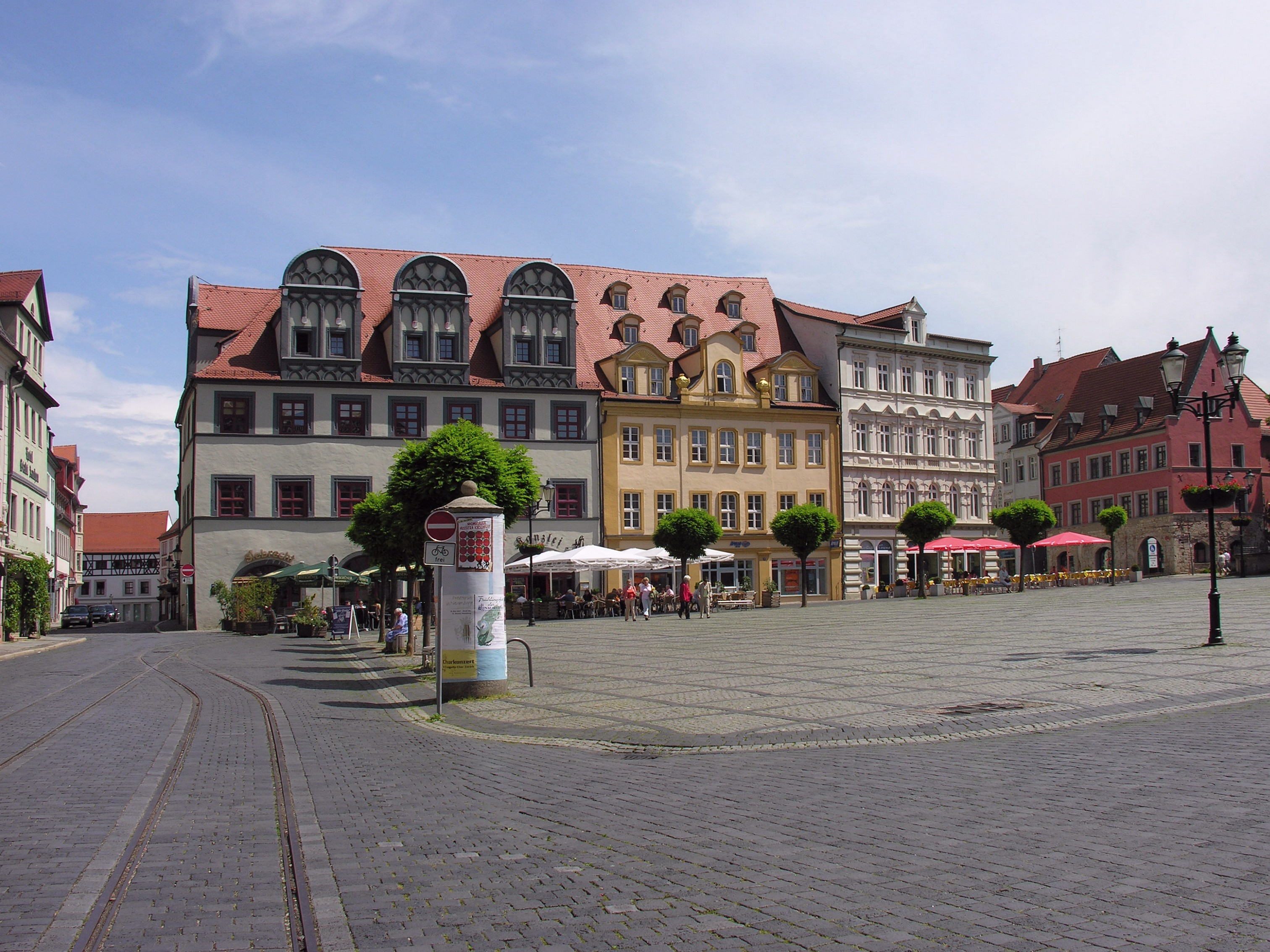
Naumburg Market place

=== Naumburg Cathedral ===
Naumburg Cathedral is a UNESCO world heritage site. The cathedral is composed of a Romanesque core structure flanked by two Gothic choirs in the east and in the west. Naumburg Cathedral was one of the large double-choir cathedrals built in the transitional style between Late Romanesque and Early Gothic. The four towers form part of the Romanesque structure of the cathedral, even though parts of the upper floors and domes date from more recent style periods. The cathedral is a vaulted, cruciform basilica in a bound system with a segregated crossing.

The Late Romanesque structure of Naumburg Cathedral replaced the first, Early Romanesque cathedral, which had been consecrated around 1042. The new construction was initiated in 1242 under the patronage of the Princes of the Apostles – Peter and Paul.

Naumburg Masters

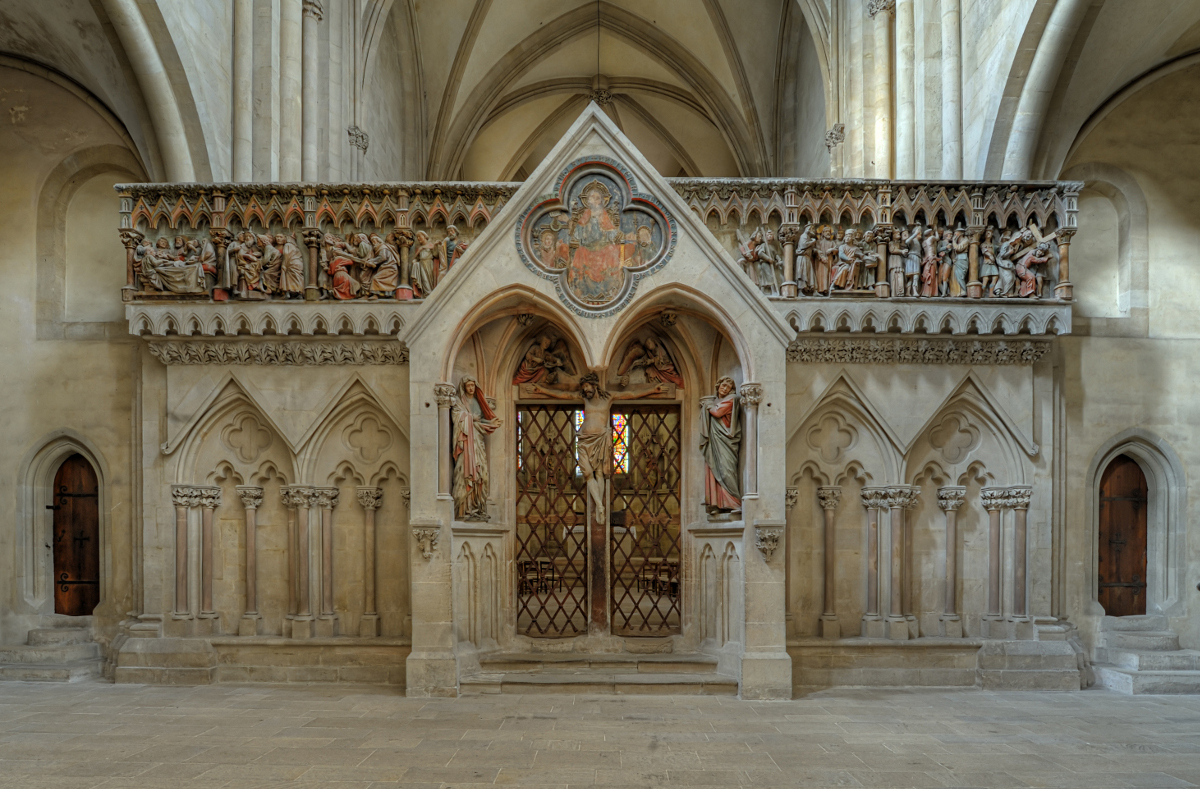
West choir

The workshop organization of sculptors and stonemasons, the Naumburg Master innovated architecture and sculpture of the Hohenstaufen period of the 13th century that were particularly developed at the cathedral in Reims.

No written sources about the chief sculptor-architect of this workshop who was named after his main work in Naumburg. However, there is a general consensus with regard to the itinerary of the building workshop from Mainz via Naumburg to Meissen. An assumption relying on the analysis of historic sources is based on the idea that the milestones of his creative work are marked by the completion of the choir screen in Mainz in 1239, the west choir in Naumburg in 1249/50 and the work of the building workshop in Meissen from 1250 up until prior to 1268.

Next to the plant ornaments, based on the thorough observation of nature and found in all three places, and next to the many matching architectural details, identical stonemason's marks recently found in Iben, Naumburg and Meissen support the evidence. The migration of the building workshop of the Naumburg Master, from Northern France over the Middle Rhine area up to the eastern boundaries of the German Empire and further on to southwestern Europe, reflects the extensive European cultural exchange during the High Middle Ages.

Choir screens

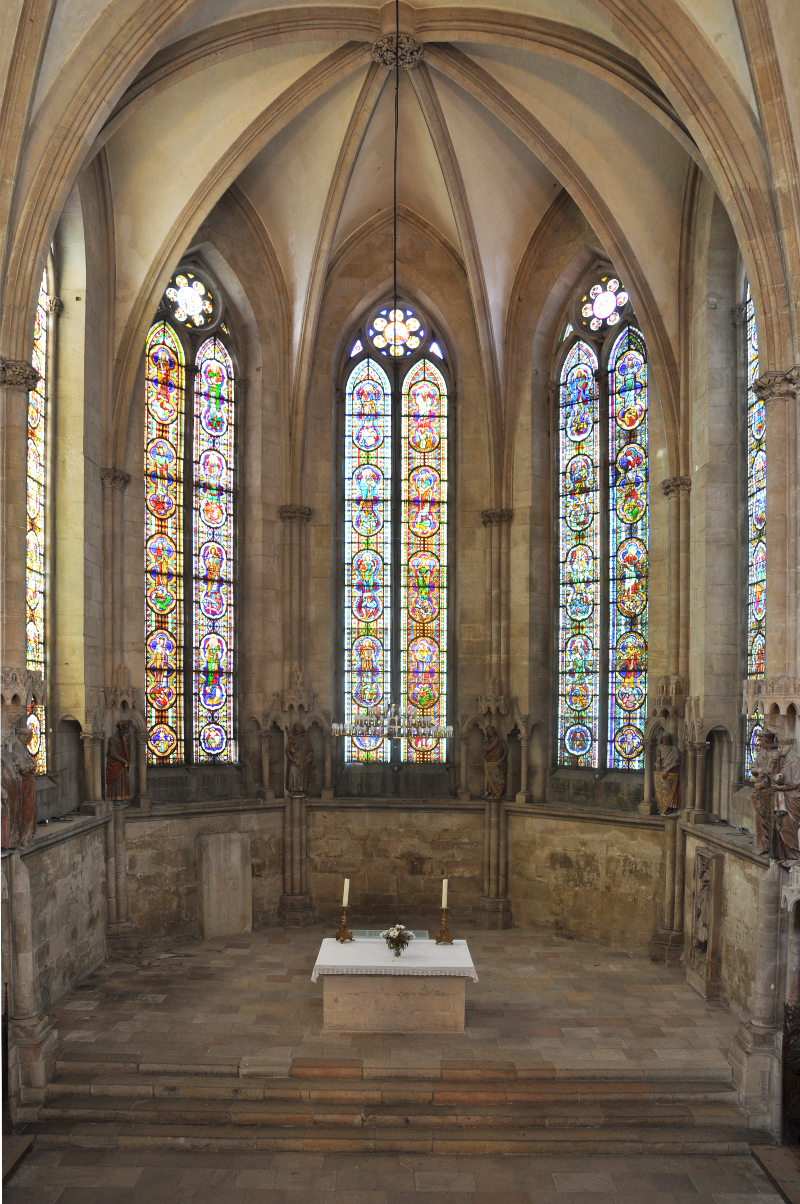
West choir Naumburg

This mural choir screen type combines high artistic architecture, ornamentation and figural sculptures. The plant décor of the west choir, due to its exceptional accuracy and the great variety of shapes to be seen on the capitals, friezes and corbels (corydalis, mugwort, hazel and vine), softens the sharpness and blocky features of the partition architecture and emphasises the organic character of the architecture.

The relief frieze is one of the most sophisticated and formally most perfected arrangement of the Passion of Christ among the preserved sculptural ensembles from the 13th century throughout Europe. It shows the last supper, the payment of the pieces of silver, the capture, Peter's denial, two guards, the reading of Christ's sentence, the flagellation and the carrying of the cross. An important theme of the cycle is the juxtaposition of Judas and Peter; Judas, the sinner who was desperate and damned; Peter, the sinner who believed in forgiveness and became a saint.

The Namburg Master's work is known for dramatic expressiveness and natural vibrancy. The monumental multi-coloured crucifixion group in the central portal of the choir screen shows depicts suffering of Christ and the deep grief of Mary and John. Other scenes also demonstrate nuanced detail work: the Jews, for example, wear the typical hats, while Pilatus appears in a splendorous courtly garment. Elements of the frieze also demonstrate how the Naumburg Master worked within the given confines. In the Last Supper, for example, Christ surrounded by only four of the twelve disciples; the figure of Judas remains isolated.

Gothic west choir

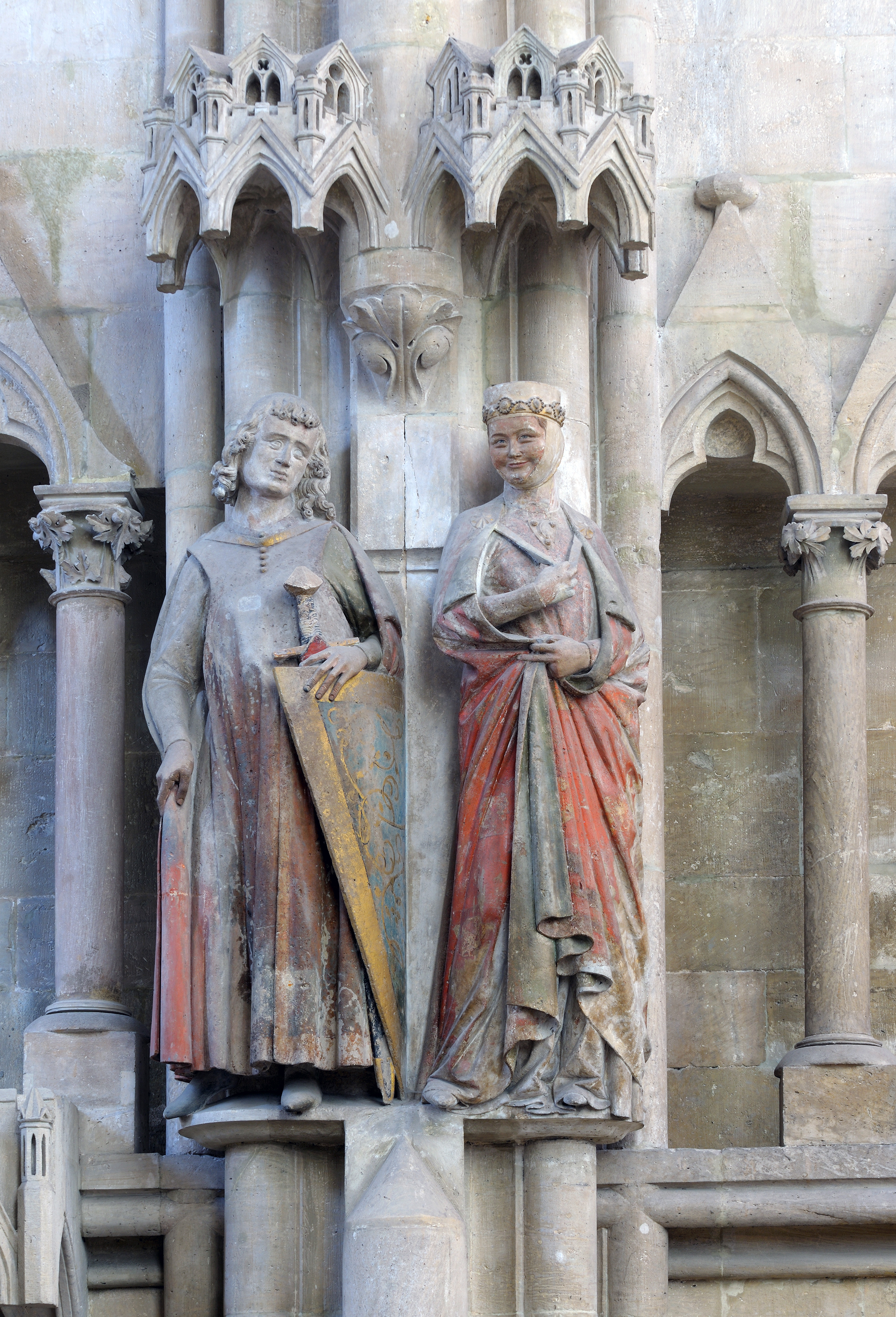
Founder figures Hermann und Reglindis

The Early Gothic west choir is a hall choir and was built with an elevated gallery. On the level of the gallery, the ten pillars supporting the vault merge with the life-sized sculptures of the founders. The twelve statues of the founders of Naumburg Cathedral rank among the most outstanding creations of European medieval sculpting.

The nearly portrait-like representation of aristocratic men and women of the Thuringian-Saxon nobility is an unparalleled appreciation of the first founders of the church. Even though the people honoured with the sculptures had already been dead for 150 to 200 years at the time of creation, they are shown wearing contemporary courtly garments from the middle of the 13th century. The faces are individual and express inner emotions. The figures interact with the beholder and apparently with each other through looks and gestures.

The attempt to relate the sculptures of the founders to the first founders of the church that were mentioned in the call for donations from 1249 has proven to be an unsolvable undertaking, even after the meticulous examinations of the colouration of the statues during the restoration work. The prevalent opinion in art science is that the statues on the south side are Countess Gerburg and Count Conrad and those on the north side are Countess Berchta and Count Theodoric.

Two founder couples are standing across from each other in clearly prominent positions: Ekkehard II, Margrave of Meissen, with his wife Uta in the north and his older brother, Margrave Hermann, with his wife Reglindis in the south. Only the sculpture of Uta has experienced an unparalleled cult, fostered considerably by the photographs of Walter Hege in the early 20th century.

=== Old Town of Naumburg ===
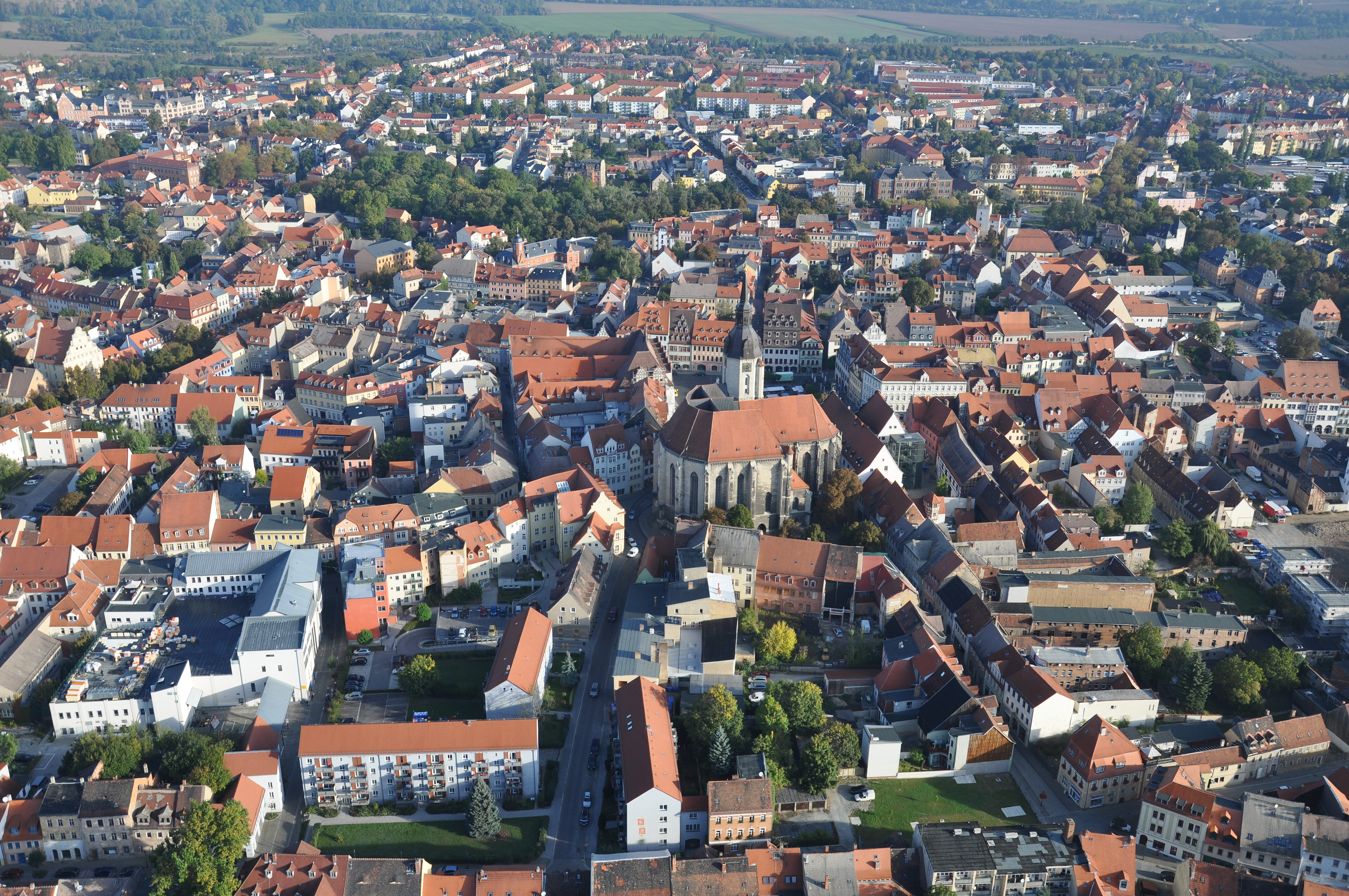
Old city of Naumburg

The layout of both the bishop's district and the old town, still intact to this day, were both created between the 11th and 13th centuries. They feature a number of high medieval monuments like the cathedral itself, the romanic residential tower next to the cathedral, the early gothic residential tower at the market square as well as the city wall.

Naumburg, a bishop's seat and an important market place, was founded at the beginning of the 11th century. It was first mentioned in the records in the year 1012.

Some settlements already existed in the immediate neighbourhood of the newly founded town, as evidenced by pottery found at Domberg Hill, in the Othmarsviertel and in the western part of today's town. There are no traces of the former Slav fortress of Wethau, which only survives in the name of the municipality of Wethau, where it is assumed to have been located.

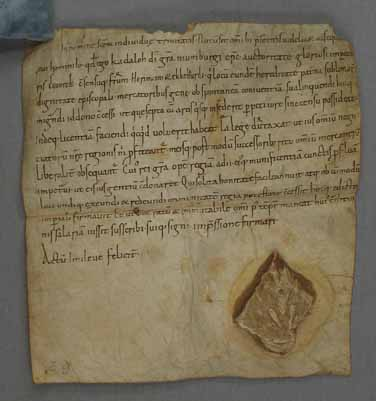
Certificate Naumburg

The early development of the town of Naumburg is closely connected with the Ekkehardine dynasty, Emperor Conrad II and Bishop Hildeward of Zeitz, who transferred the family seat from Kleinjena to their own estate at the new castle in Naumburg (Nuenburch) around 1028.

In 1030, Naumburg appears in the sources with the addition ″civitas″. Encouraged by a privilege granted by Emperor Conrad II in 1033 the merchants of Kleinjena also moved to Naumburg, being guaranteed free trade and the heritable, interest-free ownership of their enclosed domicile. Ekkehard II and Hermann also established two monasteries: The Benedictine Monastery of St George and the St Moritz Monastery of the Augustinian Canons.

When the Ekkehardine dynasty died out by 1046, the bishops became the rulers of the town. By that time, Naumburg had already developed into a political, economic and religious centre. The foundation of Naumburg with its merchant settlement had also caused the trade routes in the region to relocate, concentrating on Naumburg located at the crossing of the Via Regia and the Regensburg Road.

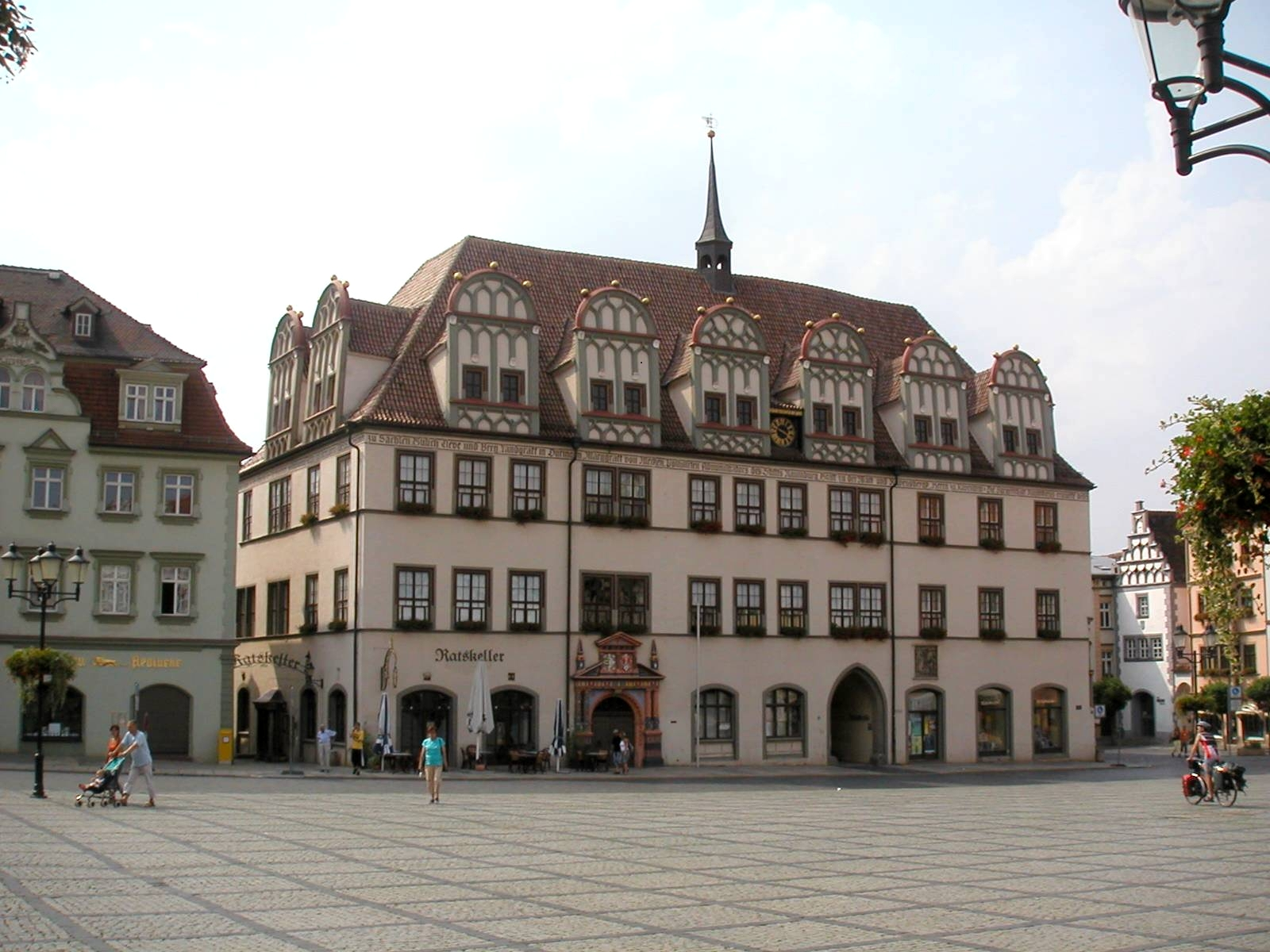
Naumburg Town hall

The cathedral district (cathedral precincts, cathedral town) and the civil district as well as the immunities of the two monasteries coexisted for centuries and were visibly separated from each other by means of fortifications, forming districts subject to special rights. The relevant areas, subject to special rights held by the bishop and his cathedral chapter, included castles, towns, church institutions, villages, forums, but also fields, meadows and forests, and were enclosed by trenches, ramparts, walls, or fences.

The oldest residential tower of Naumburg was built probably in the mid-12th century at the cathedral precincts, at the curia episcopalis, Domplatz 1. It exhibits the same dimensions as the residential tower of the Haus zur Hohen Lilie and has two Romanesque floors. Another residential tower used to be located on the south side of the west choir of Naumburg Cathedral. It had to give way to the new west choir built in the second quarter of the 13th century. The Haus zur Hohen Lilie (Markt 19) is a Romanesque secular building including a tower visible from the market square, the kitchen building to the west of the tower, the northern building bordering the tower and the Baroque building north of the northern building. Some parts of the medieval city fortifications survive, including one of the old city gates, the Marientor. The German philosopher Friedrich Nietzsche spent his childhood and his later years in Naumburg in the home of his mother's family. The house, known as the Nietzsche-Haus, is now a museum.

== Politics ==
The office of Oberbürgermeister (Lord Mayor) was held by Bernward Küper (CDU) between 2007 and 2021. In April 2021, Armin Müller (CDU) was elected Lord Mayor.

== Economy ==
Local industries include the manufacture of foodstuffs, textiles, machinery and toys. Naumburg is in a wine-growing region, with numerous vineyards in the surrounding area.

== Sports ==
SC Naumburg was a former football club in the city from September 1899 to 1908.

== Arts and culture ==
=== Hussite Cherry Festival ===
Every year on the last weekend in June, when the cherries are ripe, the city of Naumburg celebrates the Hussite Cherry Festival. This festival has a long tradition and dates back to at least the 16th century. Since the 17th century the celebrations have been connected with the legendary siege of Naumburg by the Hussites in 1432. A teacher is said to have led his pupils outside the gates of the beleaguered city to beg the Hussite commander Andreas Prokop for mercy. The latter granted their request and gave the children cherries. The legend is commemorated in the song "Die Hussiten zogen vor Naumburg" (The Hussites marched on Naumburg) written by Karl Friedrich Seyferth in 1832.

=== Central German St. James Way ===
Naumburg is located on the central German route of the St. James pilgrims way to Santiago de Compostela, the so-called Camino de Santiago. It follows the old Via Regia which has been designated a Cultural Route of the Council of Europe in 2005.

=== Transromanica ===
Another recognised cultural route is the German section of the international Transromanica (a Cultural Route of the Council of Europe since 2007).

== Education ==
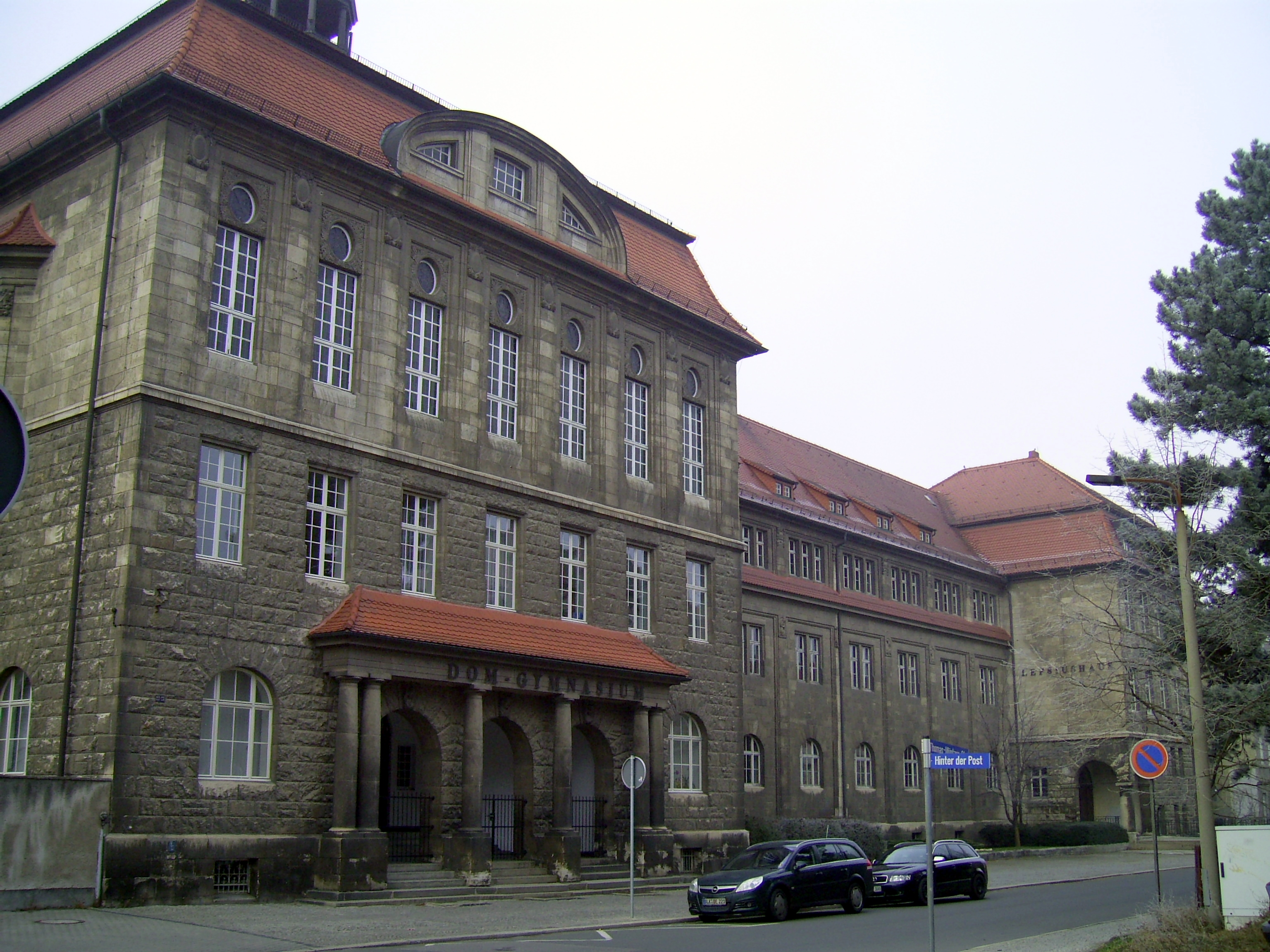
Domgymnasium

Naumburg had two grammar schools, the Domgymnasium and the Lepsiusgymnasium. After the fusion of both and the migration from the school site Seminarstraße in the year 2007, the Domgymnasium is now housed in the buildings of the former Lepsiusgymnasium. Since the incorporation of Bad Kösen, the town has a second gymnasium again, Pforta.

Between 1948 and 1993 Naumburg possessed an ecclesiastical university with the name Katechistisches Oberseminar (Catechetical advanced seminar), where theology, philosophy, religious education and for a while religious law was taught. At the same time there was an ecclesiastical proseminar. Here pupils, who were refused the Abitur at public schools during the SED regime, were able to attain an ecclesiastical qualification.

== Twin towns – sister cities ==
Naumburg is twinned with:

- Aachen, Germany
- Nidda, Germany
- Les Ulis, France
- Armavir, Armenia (since 2025)

== Notable people ==
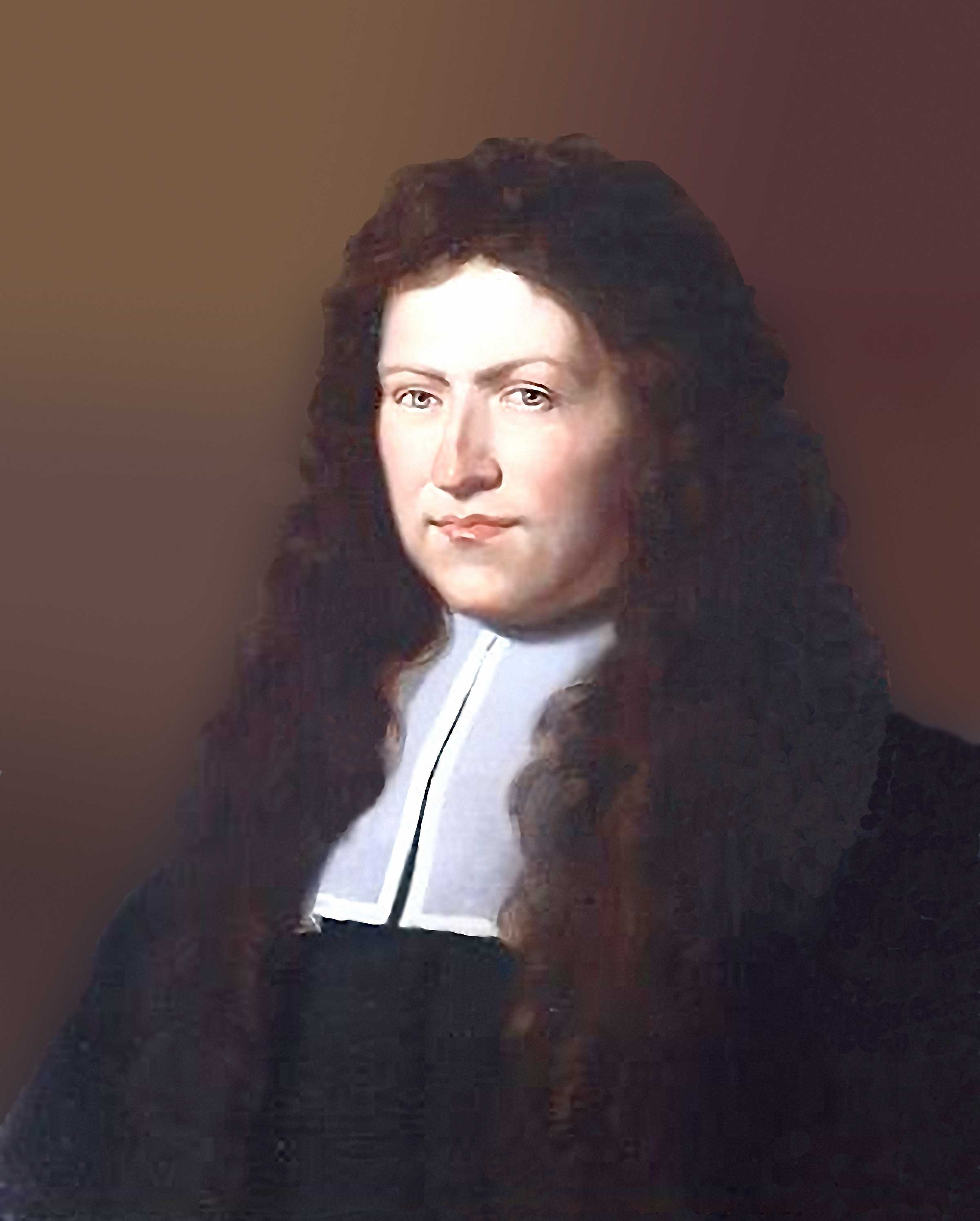
Johann Georg Graevius

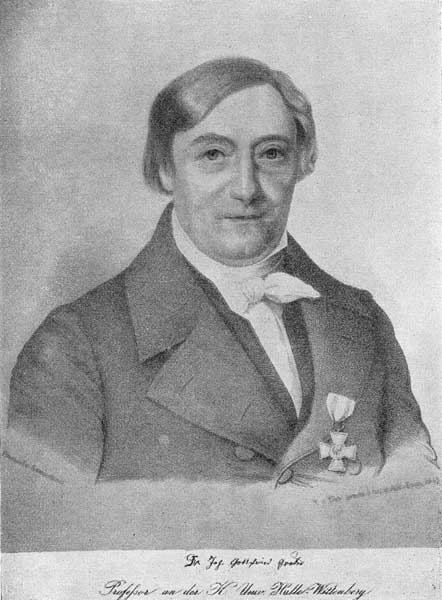
Johann Gottfried Gruber 1848

- Volkwin (?–1236), Master of the Livonian Brothers of the Sword
- Elias Ammerbach (c. 1530–1597), organist
- Johann Georg Graevius (1632–1703), classical scholar and critic.
- Johann Theile (1646–1724), composer of the Baroque era
- Johann Heinrich Acker (1647–1719), writer
- Johann Gottfried Gruber (1774–1851), critic and literary historian.
- Christian Lobeck (1781–1860), classical scholar.
- Karl Richard Lepsius (1810–1884), egyptologist, linguist and librarian.
- Gustav von Goßler (1838–1902), politician (German Conservative Party)
- Friedrich Nietzsche (1844–1900), philosopher, cultural critic, poet and philologist, lived in Naumburg 1849-1864.
- Oskar Hergt (1869-1967), politician
- Gisela von Poswik (1875–1940), radiologist
- Götz Friedrich (1930–2000), director and theater director
- Klaus Keitel (1939-2026) journalist and politician
- Bärbel Podeswa (born 1946), athlete
- Botho Strauß (born 1944), playwright, novelist and essayist
- Sophia Martineck (born 1981), illustrator, designer and comics artist

=== Bishops of Naumburg ===
- Engelhard of Naumburg (1206–1242), see List of religious leaders in 1220
- John of Neumarkt (1310–1380) was Chancellor of Charles IV, Holy Roman Emperor
- Johannes Ambundii (1384–1424) was a German ecclesiastic.
- Nicolaus von Amsdorf (1483–1565), a German Lutheran theologian and an early Protestant reformer.
- Johannes Agricola (1494–1566), a German Protestant Reformer
- Julius von Pflug (1499–1564), the last Catholic bishop of the Diocese of Naumburg
