= Louis Victor Robert Schwartzkopff =

German industrialist

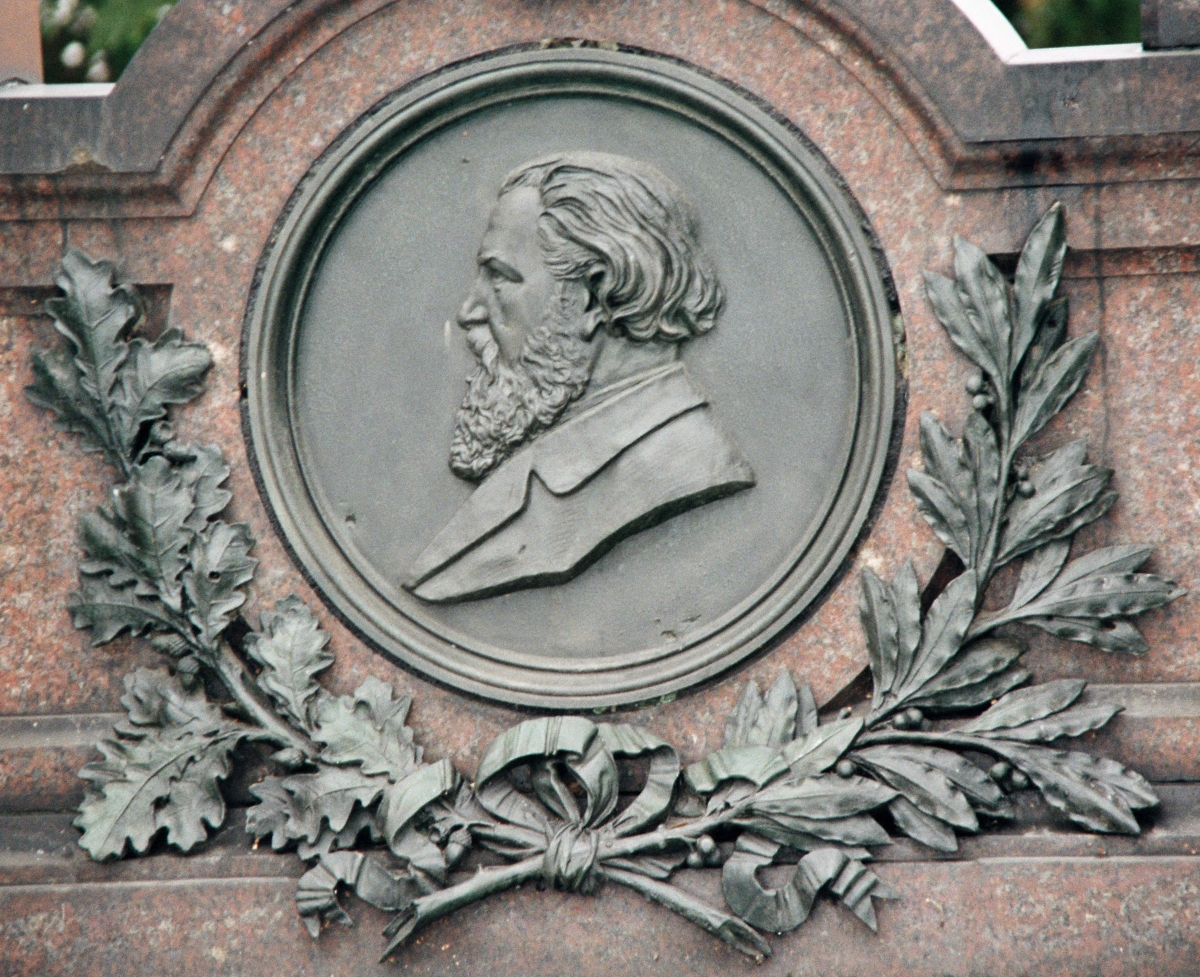
Medaillon on the Schwartzkopff grave memorial, Dorotheenstadt cemetery, Berlin

Louis Victor Robert Schwartzkopff (5 June 1825 - 7 March 1892) was a German industrialist and founder of the Berliner Maschinenbau (BMAG) mechanical engineering company, chiefly known as manufacturer of steam locomotives.

== Life ==
Louis Schwartzkopff was born in Magdeburg, then capital of the Prussian province of Saxony. Between 1831 and 1842 he attended the grammar school in Magdeburg as well as the trade school there, where he, together with Carl Wilhelm Siemens, studied mathematics under Carl’s brother, Werner von Siemens. From 1842 to 1845 Schwartzkopff attended the trade institute (Gewerbeinstitut) founded by Wilhelm Beuth in Berlin. After that he did his practical training at the firm of Borsig, where he got to know August Borsig personally. Schwartzkopff finished his training with a six-month post as an engine driver on the Berlin-Hamburg Railway. Between 1847 and 1851 he was the chief mechanical engineer (Maschinenmeister) of the Magdeburg-Wittenberge Railway.

With the support of his family he bought the site at Chausseestrasse 20, which was bordered to the south by Invalidenstrasse and to the east by the Berlin-Stettin Railway. Under the terrain of the latter is the underground S-Bahn station called Nordbahnhof.

On 3 October 1852 he founded, together with the then Berliner Gießereimeister Nitsche the Schwartzkopff and Nitsche Iron Foundry & Engineering Works (Eisengießerei and Maschinenfabrik Schwartzkopff and Nitsche) in Berlin, from which the Berliner Maschinenbau AG vorm. L. Schwartzkopff emerged in 1870. Schwartzkopff wanted above all to expand the engineering works, whilst Nitsche preferred to concentrate on artistic castings. So Schwartzkopff bought Nitsche out in 1853 and from then on ran the firm as the only owner. Until 30 June 1888 he was the general manager of the company, but then pulled out of the firm entirely.

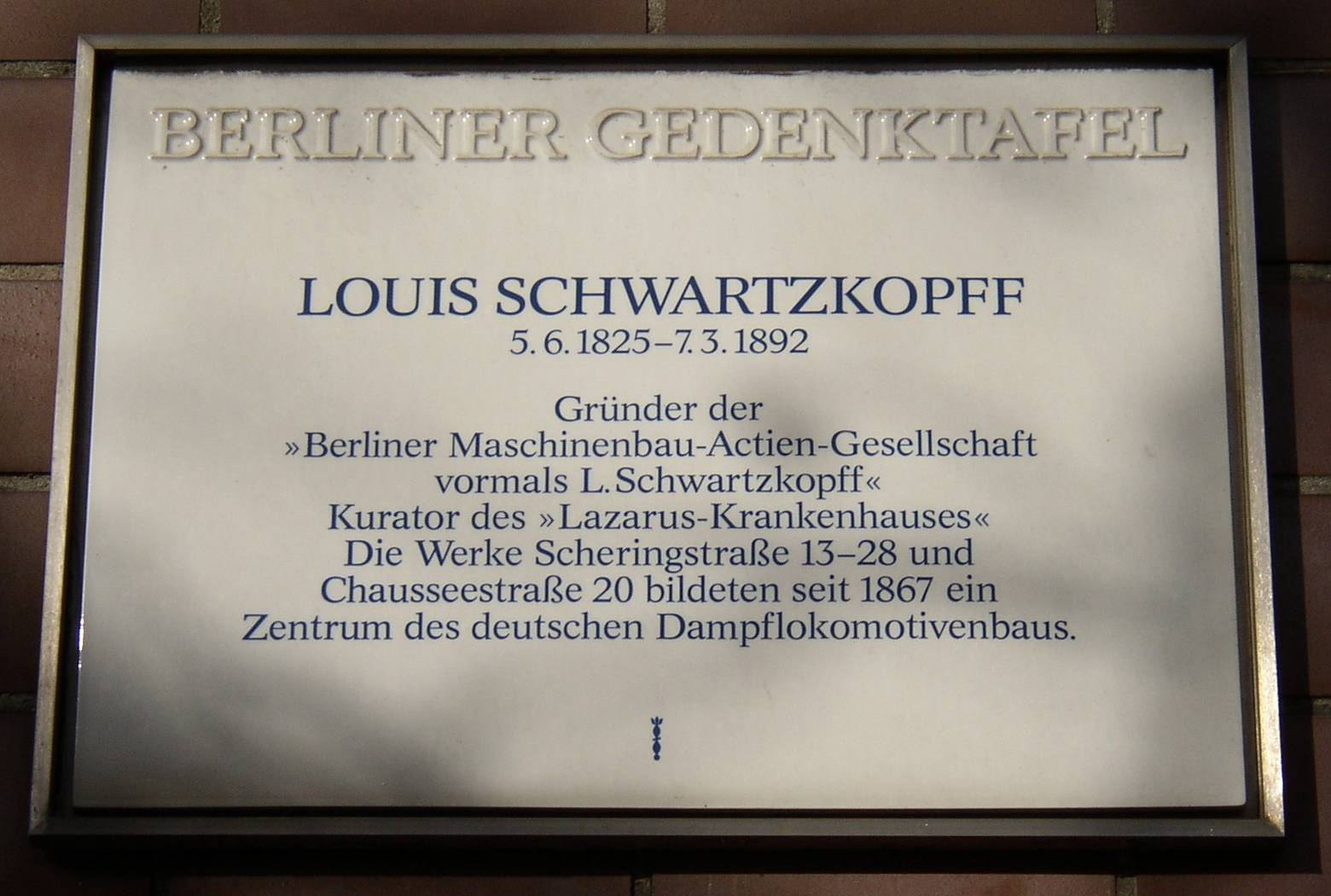
Memorial tablet in Berlin-Gesundbrunnen (Scheringstrasse)

The company's production in support of the military and the railway industry resulted, in the 1860s, in Schwartzkopff being granted the title of Kommerzienrat, a historical title conferred on distinguished industrialists or financiers. In 1867, when the production of goods locomotives for the Lower Silesian-Märkische Railway began, Schwartzkopff moved the general engineering side of the business to a newly acquired site in Ackerstrasse, whilst the core business expanded on the previous sites at Chausseestrasse 19 and 23. Schwartzkopff had also acquired the site at Scheringstrasse 13-28 in Berlin-Gesundbrunnen.

At the end of the 1880s Schwartzkopff was appointed to the Council of State for the Prussian Government (Staatsrat der Preußischen Regierung). On 7 March 1892 he died as the result of a stroke. During his life Schwartzkopff always held his master, August Borsig, in high esteem.

Schwartzkopff was curator of the Lazarus Hospital. Schwartzkopffstrasse in Berlin-Mitte was named in his honour on 12 March 1889.

He was buried at the Dorotheenstadt cemetery in Berlin.

== Sources ==
- de:Louis Victor Robert Schwartzkopff
