= Poetae Latini Minores =

Poetae Latini Minores ("Minor Latin Poets") may refer to collections of Latin poetry edited by:

- Emil Baehrens
- Pieter Burman the Elder
- Johann Christian Wernsdorf
