= Gisela von Poswik =

American physician

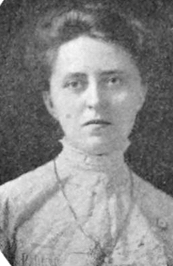
- Gisela von Poswik, from a 1911 yearbook.
- Born: Gisela Johanna Ida von Poswik; June 19, 1875; Naumburg, Germany
- Died: October 2, 1940 (aged 65); Scranton, Pennsylvania, U.S.
- Occupations: Nurse, physician, radiologist

Gisela Johanna Ida von Poswik (June 19, 1875 – October 2, 1940) was a German-born American nurse and physician and an early specialist in radiology.

== Early life ==
Gisela von Poswik was born in 1875, in Naumburg, Germany, the daughter of Count Jacobus Napoleon von Poswik and Maria Johanna Lieskau von Poswik. She earned a nursing certificate from the Lankenau Hospital of Philadelphia in 1903. In 1911, she earned a medical degree at the Woman's Medical College of Pennsylvania.

== Career ==
Von Poswik served in administrative roles at hospitals in Harrisburg and Philadelphia. She was superintendent of a sanitarium in White Haven, Pennsylvania. In a 1907 article for the American Journal of Nursing, she dispensed advice to nurses, including "Never share a bed with your patient." Other scholarly publications by von Poswik included "The Value of the Roentgen Diagnosis, for the General Practitioner, in Gastro-Intestinal Diseases" (1916). She presented a paper titled "The Value of X-Ray Treatment in Cases of Pyorrhea" at a meeting of the Scranton Dental Association in 1922.

She was the first woman member of the American Roentgen Ray Society, read a paper at the Third International Congress of Radiology in Paris in 1931, and was a member of the American Medical Association of Vienna. From 1916 to 1918, she was chief "roentgenologist" (radiologist) at Hahnemann Hospital in Scranton, Pennsylvania. Her obituary in The New York Times noted that "she was the first woman physician in the United States to have her own x-ray equipment." She was the founding president of the Lankenau Hospital School of Nursing Alumnae Association.

== Personal life ==
Gisela von Poswik became a United States citizen in 1919. She died in 1940 in Scranton, Pennsylvania, at age 65. A scrapbook of von Poswik's creation, including clippings, notes and photographs, is in the collection of Drexel University College of Medicine Archives and Special Collections.
