= Gregor Wilhelm Nitzsch =

German classical scholar (1790–1861)

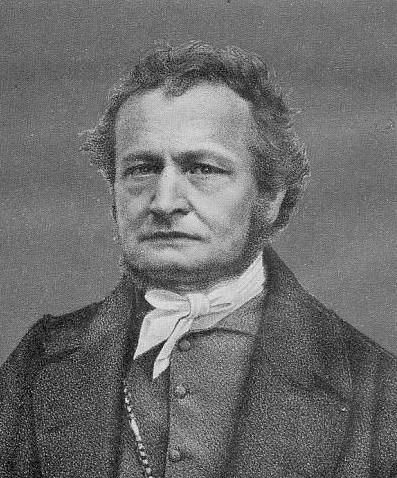
Gregor Wilhelm Nitzsch

Gregor Wilhelm Nitzsch (22 November 1790 – 22 July 1861) was a German classical scholar known chiefly for his writings on Homeric epic.

== Biography ==
Son of Karl Ludwig Nitzsch and brother of Karl Immanuel Nitzsch, he was born at Wittenberg. In 1827 he was appointed professor of ancient literature at the University of Kiel, but in 1852 was dismissed by the Danish government for his German sympathies. In the same year, he accepted a similar post at Leipzig, which he held until his death.

In opposition to F. A. Wolf and Karl Lachmann, Nitzsch maintained that the Iliad and Odyssey were not an aggregate of single, short poems but long and complete ones, composed by the same single author according to a uniform plan with a central dramatic idea. His writings were broad, dealing with every side of the controversy over the Homeric Question. In the earlier part of his Meletemata (1830), he took up the question of written or unwritten literature, on which Wolf's entire argument turned, and showed that the art of writing must be anterior to Peisistratos. In the later part of the same series of discussions (1837), and in his chief work (Die Sagenpoesie der Griechen, 1852), he investigated the structure of the Homeric poems, and their relation to the other epics of the Trojan cycle.

Nitzsch died at Leipzig.

His son, Karl Wilhelm Nitzsch (1818–1880), became professor of history at Königsberg in 1862 and at Berlin in 1872.

== Important works ==
- De historia Homeri: maximeque de scriptorum carminum aetate meletemata (1830)
- Erklärende Anmerkungen zu Homers Odyssee, i.–xii. (1826–1840)
- Die Sagenpoesie der Griechen (1852)
- Beiträge zur Geschichte der epischen Poesie der Griechen (pub. 1862, ed. C. W. Nitzsch)

== See also ==
- Friedrich August Berthold Nitzsch (his nephew)
