= Nitsch =

Nitsch is a German language surname that stems from a reduced form of the male given name Nicholas. It may refer to:

- Fritz Heinisch (1900–1983), American football end
- Herbert Nitsch (1970), Austrian freediver
- Hermann Nitsch (1938–2022), Austrian avant-garde artist
- Jennifer Nitsch (1966–2004), German television actress
- Johannes Nitsch (born 1937), former German politician
- Kazimierz Nitsch (1874–1958), Polish linguist
- Leopold Nitsch (1897–1977), Austrian footballer and coach
- Robert Nitsch, British Army general
- Sybilla Nitsch (born 1980), German politician
