= OroVerde – Die Tropenwaldstiftung =

Environmental organisation

- Abbreviation: OroVerde
- Types: nonprofit organization
- Legal status: private foundation
- Aim: Conservation, Ecology, Environmental education
- Headquarters: Bonn
- Country: Germany
- Revenue: 6,975,854 euro (2025)
- Employees: 42 (2024)
- Volunteers: 11 (2024)
- Awards: DZI Seal-of-Approval
- Website: www.regenwald-schuetzen.org/english

OroVerde – Die Tropenwaldstiftung (OroVerde - The Tropical Forest Foundation) is a non-profit environmental organisation working on the preservation of tropical forests. For this purpose, international projects are initiated, supported and realized in cooperation with local partner organisations. In Germany, environmental education projects are promoted and materials for teachers and pupils are created.

OroVerde was founded in 1989 by renowned individuals from business and nature sciences in Frankfurt. Today OroVerde's projects are coordinated from Bonn. There are 10 full-time staff members working for the organisation, as well as volunteers and interns. Currently Volkhard Wille is chairman of OroVerde and Prof. Manfred Niekisch, PhD, director of the Frankfurt Zoological Garden, is chairman of the foundation board.

== Goals and projects ==
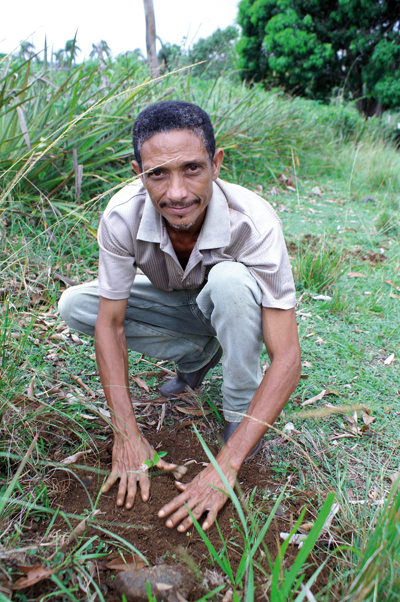
Reforestation project in Central America

=== International projects ===
The implementation of the conservation projects is done by local partner organisations which are supported by experts from OroVerde until they can conduct the projects by themselves. The most important project activities are the reforestation of destroyed or degraded land, the installation of Protected areas, the environmental education of the local inhabitants and the joint development of sustainable forest management strategies to reduce the impact on the tropical forests.
Currently, OroVerde is implementing projects in:

- Cuba: Support of the rangers and staff of the Alejandro de Humboldt National Park.
- Guatemala: Purchase of land; reforestation and environmental education in the Sierra del Lacandón National Park.
- Honduras: Reforestation in the Patuca National Park (located in the area of the Patuca River and Coco River), support of the local communities in drinking water management and environmental education.
- Ecuador: Support of the Kichwa Indians of Sarayaku in their resistance against oil companies that plan to exploit the Kichwa's land for oil production; strengthening their capacity, development and cultural identity.
- Venezuela: Reforestation of degraded areas in one of the last cloud forests on the Paria Peninsula; environmental education of the local communities; developing and initiating alternative, environment-friendly income sources, e.g. establishing of agroforestry systems to facilitate a sustainable cocoa farming in the area of Serranía de la Cerbatana.
- Central America (Cuba, Nicaragua and Dominican Republic): OroVerde cooperates here with the Welthungerhilfe to improve the nutrition and living situation of those communities living in the buffer zones of three national parks and to assist them in developing a sustainable livelihood.
- Indonesia: Mapping and ecological monitoring of the forests to protect and preserve the biodiversity on the Raja Ampat Islands; developing and initiating alternative, environment-friendly and sustainable income sources (for example, OroVerde supported the building of the environmental education center "El Refugio del Bosque").

=== National projects ===
In Germany, the main focus of work is environmental education, providing information about the tropical forests and enhancing the exchange of information between environmental organisations, the economy, science and policy.
Currently, there are projects in the following sections:

- Forest & Climate: The project Forest & Climate is providing information about forest and climate projects, evaluating the existing certification standards and developing guidelines for companies and private investors.

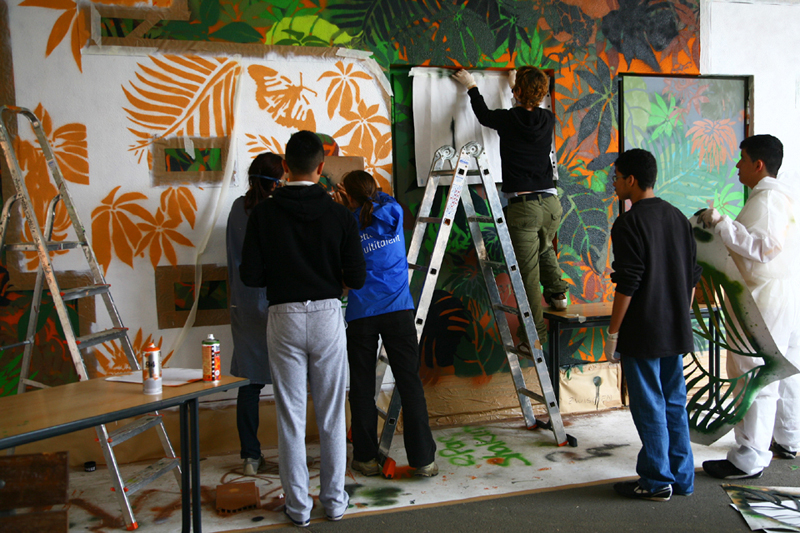
Pupils working on a graffito for "Weil wir es wert sind!"

- Environmental education: OroVerde organizes environmental education projects and provides teaching materials. The pilot project "Weil wir es wert sind!" ("Because we're worth it!") and the poster competition "Geist ist geil! - How Advertising Works" were chosen as Official German Projects of the UN Decade Education for Sustainable Development.
- Political work and networking: Because global trade and subventions have a high impact on tropical countries, for example by the import of wood, soy (for factory farming) or palm oil, OroVerde participates in political debates by making statements, discussing with politicians and joining official hearings.

== Financing of the projects ==
In 2010, OroVerde received 1,497,812 € of subsidies, donations, money allocations and project fundings. The total expenditure was 1,474,472 €, of which 85% directly went into the projects, 5% were spent on public relations and 10% on administration expenses.
