= Kleinjena =

- Location within Germany

General information
- Type: Castle
- Location: Saxony-Anhalt, Germany
- Coordinates: 51°10′47″N 11°46′41″E

Kleinjena (Little Jena in German) is situated 4 kilometres north of Naumburg on a long spur at the foot of the Finne mountain range above the village of Kleinjena, at the heart of Federal Republic of Germany in the State of Saxony-Anhalt. It has been proposed by Germany for inscription in the List of World Heritage. The World Heritage nomination is representative for the processes that shaped the continent during the High Middle Ages between 1000 and 1300: Christianization, the so-called "Landesausbau" and the dynamics of cultural exchange and transfer characteristic for this very period.

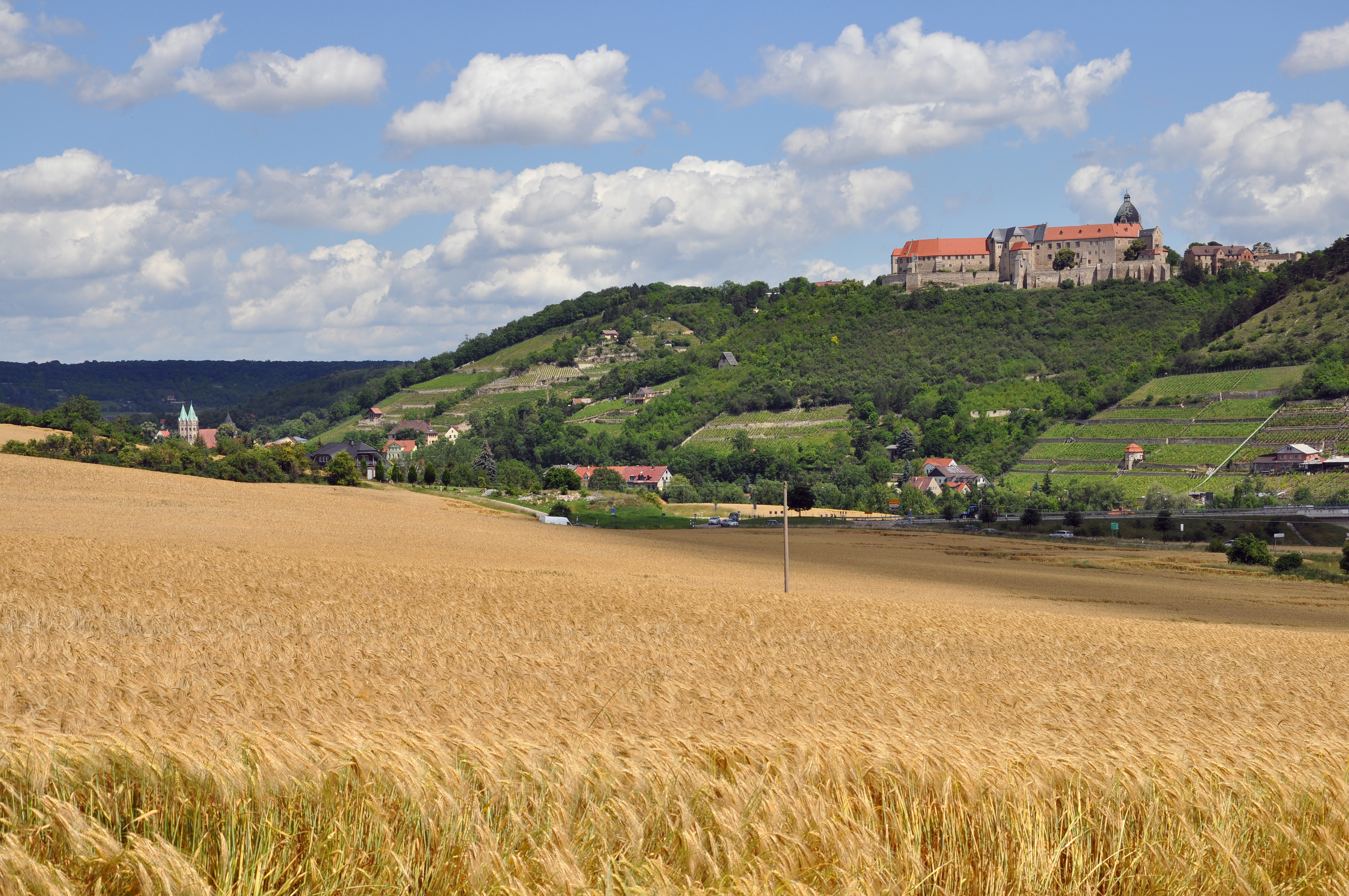
Landscape around Neuenburg

== World Heritage Nomination ==
The castle of Kleinjena is one of the eleven components of the cultural landscape Naumburg Cathedral and the High Medieval Cultural Landscape of the Rivers Saale and Unstrut. As Kleinjena marks the starting point for the vast growth of the region in the 12th century, it is indispensable for an understanding of the history of this cultural landscape as a whole. (Note: The Förderverein Welterbe an Saale und Unstrut e.V. is the coordinating body for this nomination: http://www.naumburg-cathedral.de/.)

== History ==
The castle of Kleinjena was built by the influential Ekkehardine dynasty. This dynasty owned estates in the old settlement area in the northern part of Thuringia and in the area of the confluence of the rivers Saale and Unstrut. The family seat was the castle of Gene, which was situated south of the Unstrut River in the former diocese of the Archbishopric of Mainz. Like other Ottonian palaces or imperial castles of the time, the castle complex of Ekkehard I was a segmented complex with two ramparts on a flat spur. Its main rampart and the related trench have flattened to a great extent, but they are still clearly visible in the terrain. Following the murder of Ekkehard I, the site was gradually abandoned as the margravial brothers Hermann and Ekkehard II transferred their family seatfrom Kleinjena to Naumburg (Nuenburch), first mentioned in the records in 1012.

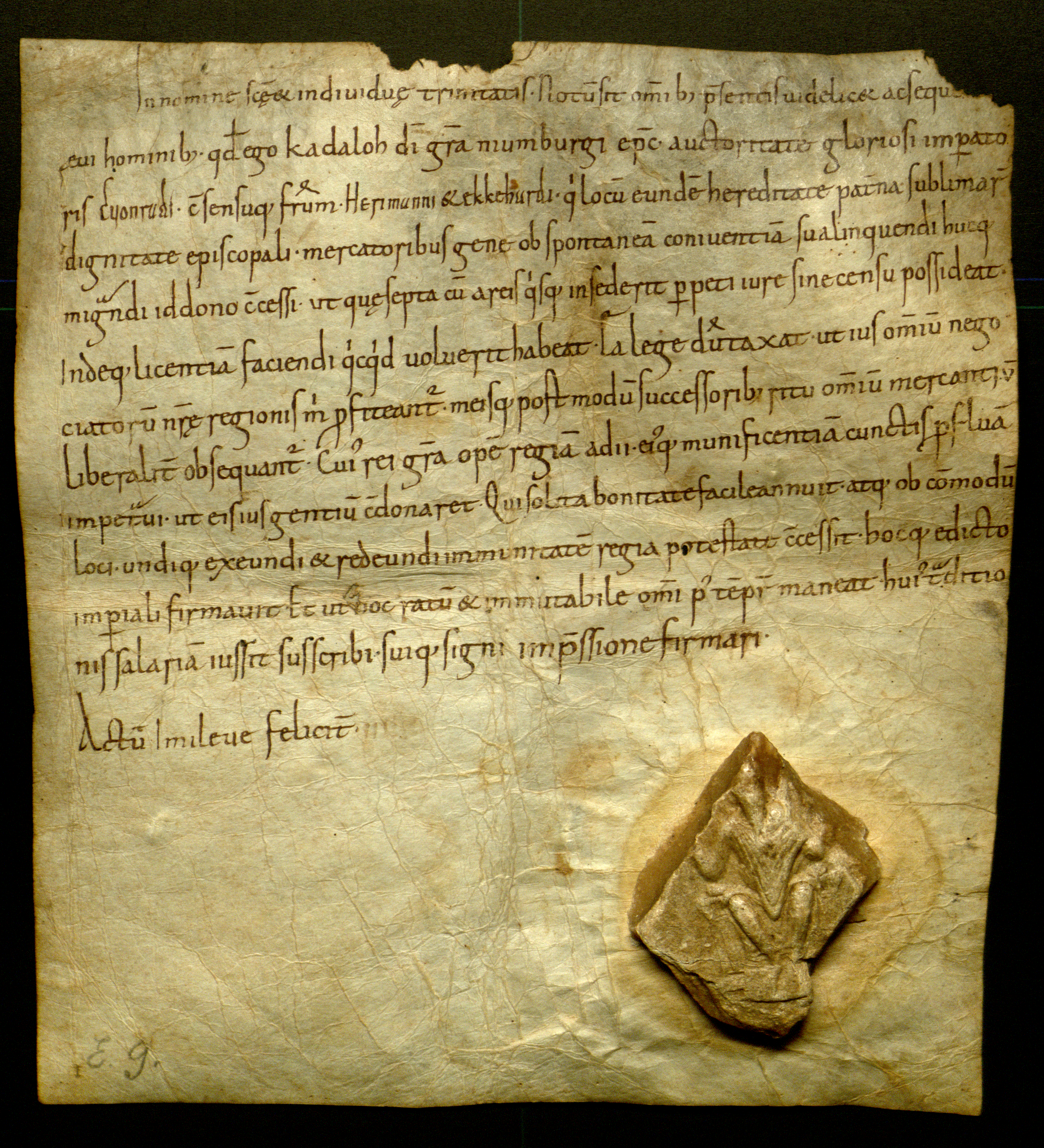
Certificate Emperor Conrad

Encouraged by a privilege granted by Emperor Conrad II in 1033, also the merchants of Kleinjena moved to Naumburg, since they were guaranteed free trade and the heritable, interest-free ownership of their enclosed domicile. The comparative advantage of Naumburg was also a topographical one as that the descent of the long-distance routes coming from the plateau was not as steep as in Kleinjena and Grossjena.

== Today ==
These archeologically documented remains of the castle of the Markgraves of Meißen, the Ekkehardines, date back to the 10th century. At the European level, these preserved structures are an early evidence of the efforts undertaken by the high nobility to impose its centre of power through large-scale fortifications that eventually served as their memorials.

== See also ==
- World Heritage Convention
- World Heritage Site
- World Heritage Committee
- High Middle Ages
- Cultural Landscape
