= Amélie Nikisch =

Belgian singer, composer (1862–1938)

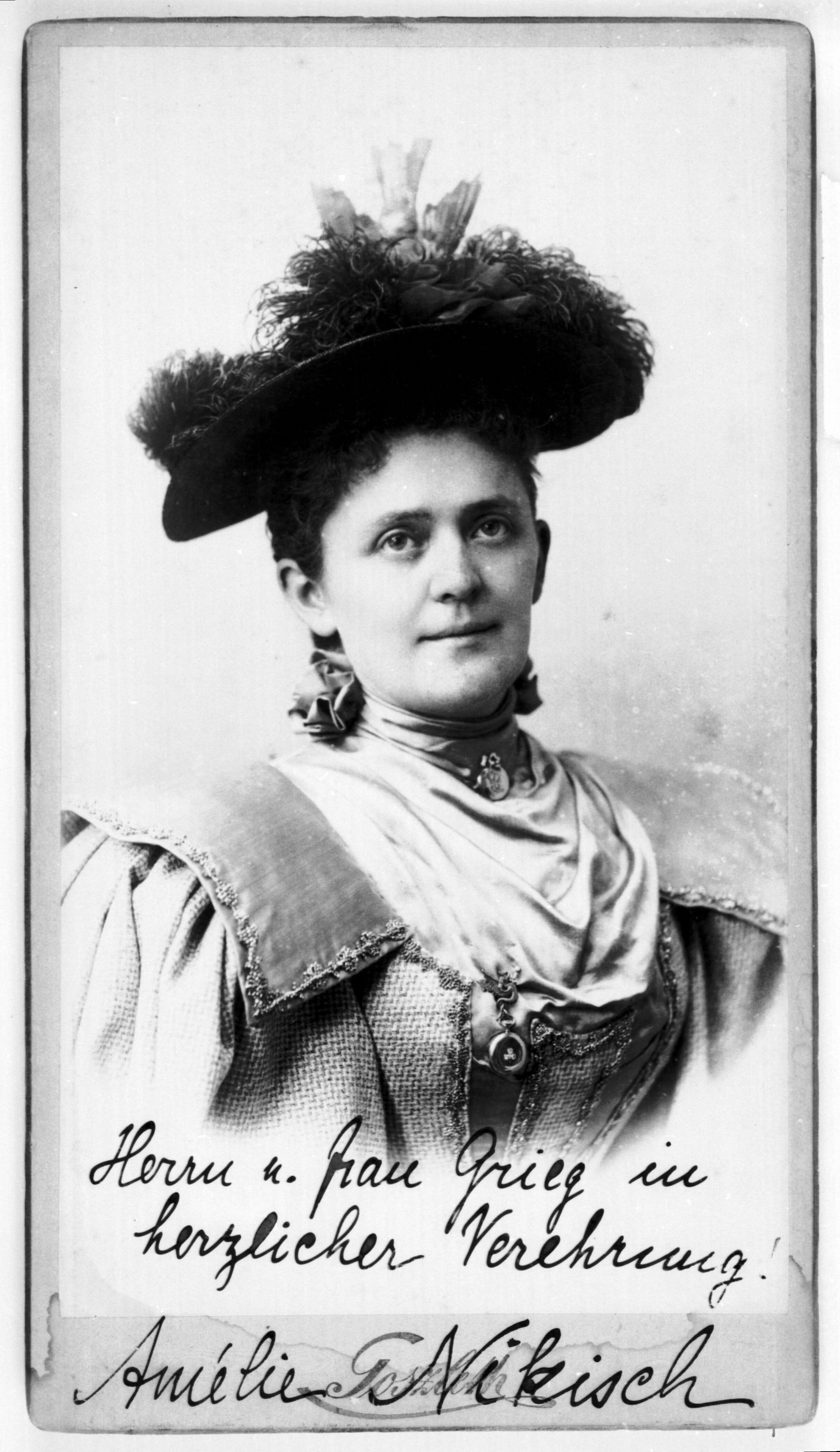
- Born: Amélie Augusta Heussner; 28 December 1862; Brussels, Belgium
- Died: 18 January 1938 (aged 75); Leipzig, Germany
- Occupations: Singer, composer
- Spouse: Arthur Nikisch
- Children: 4, including Mitja Nikisch

Amélie Heussner Nikisch (28 December 1862 – 18 January 1938) was a Belgian soprano, actress, voice teacher, and composer.

== Early life ==
Amélie Augusta Heussner was born in Brussels.

== Career ==
As a young woman, Heussner played soubrette roles in operas in Kassel and Leipzig. She taught voice lessons after she married in 1885. While her husband, Arthur Nikisch, was conducting the Boston Symphony Orchestra from 1890 to 1893, she frequently performed with the orchestra as a soprano soloist. "If anything, Mme. Nikisch's work as a vocalist might be characterized as too finished for the appreciation of the general public", noted an American newspaper in 1891, "free from all the tricks and devices that are too frequently resorted to for effect and applause".

Nikisch wrote music and lyrics for light operas. Her compositions included the operettas Prinz Adolar und das Tausendschönchen (1907, with Ilse Friedlaender), Meine Tante, deine Tante (1909), Daniel in der Löwengrube (1914, with Friedlaender), and Immer der Andere (1915).

One of her voice students was American soprano Eleanor Painter Strong.

== Personal life ==
Amélie Heussner married Hungarian conductor Arthur Nikisch (1855–1922) in 1885. They had four children; their younger son was pianist Mitja Nikisch (1899–1936). Amélie Nikisch died in 1938, in Berlin, aged 75 years. Her daughter Eleanora (Nora) Schindler married a Jewish actor, and fled Nazi persecution with help from the Nikisches' musical contacts, moving to the United States in 1941.
