= Mitja Nikisch =

- Nikisch in 1922

Background information
- Born: 21 May 1899; Leipzig, Germany
- Died: 5 August 1936 (aged 37); Venice, Italy
- Genres: Classical
- Occupation(s): Pianist, bandleader
- Instrument: Piano

Mitja Nikisch was a classical pianist and dance band leader, born in Leipzig, Germany on 21 May 1899 and died in Venice, Italy on 5 August 1936.

== Career ==
Mitja Nikisch was the son of the celebrated Hungarian orchestral conductor Arthur Nikisch and the Belgian singer and composer Amélie Nikisch. Like his parents, he became a fine interpreter of classical works. Nonetheless, while respected in that literature — he made his debut as piano soloist with the Berlin Philharmonic Orchestra on 22 April 1918, performed with classical conductors including Wilhelm Furtwängler and Sir Henry J. Wood — he was most celebrated as leader of a popular jazz band in Berlin during the Weimar Republic era. The Mitja Nikisch Dance Orchestra played in fashionable clubs and included some of the most admired popular performers in Germany of the day; prominent guitarist Otto Sachsenhauer described it as "the best dance band ever heard in Berlin”. Due to the Nazi dictatorship he had to give up the band, which he had founded in 1925.

Mitja returned to playing the piano, hoping to pick up where he had left off with his career as a concert performer. He was on summer holiday in northern Italy when he was diagnosed with lymphatic cancer. He had recently fallen in love with a woman from Moscow, Alexandra Mironova. She was twelve years his junior and was a well-known soubrette in Berlin's Schillertheater under the pseudonym Barbara Diu. Mitja called her Barbara as he did not like her Russian name. The two were planning to get married when his diagnosis of cancer came. Knowing he did not have long left to live, he feverishly began to compose a piano concerto. He dedicated several hours a day to his magnum opus as his illness released enormous amounts of energy. On Wednesday 5 August 1936, Nikisch finished the concerto and died at age 37. Barbara was in London on business when her fiancé died. The handwritten score she found upon her return to Venice was a recollection of an all-too-brief life. Nikisch dedicated it to his second wife, Barbara.

He had been married to and divorced from stage and film actress Nora Gregor.

== Recordings ==
As a classical performer, Mitja Nikisch left some reproducing piano rolls and one commercial recording, a 1934 account of Mozart's Piano Concerto no. 20 in D Minor, K. 466, with the Berlin Philharmonic Orchestra under Rudolf Schulz-Dornburg. The Tahra label reissued it in 2007 as part of a set of 4 compact discs (TAHRA 595-598).

Recordings by the Mitja Nikisch Tanz Orchester included one in 1931 of the Nacio Herb Brown-Arthur Freed tune for the MGM film Lord Byron of Broadway, Should I (Reveal Exactly How I Feel), in German as Ich kann, ich will with vocalist Paul Dorn.

His Concerto for Piano was recorded by Howard Shelley (piano) with the Graunke Symphony Orchestra conducted by Kurt Graunke, issued on Edition Sedina E.S. 107 CD.
