= Nitschke =

Nitschke is the name of:

- Jack Nitschke (1905–1982), South Australian cricketer
- Philip Nitschke (1947– ), South Australian medical doctor, founder of pro-euthanasia group Exit
- Ray Nitschke (1936–1998), American football player
- Richard Nitschke (1863–1944), South Australian baritone and racehorse owner
- Shelley Nitschke (1976– ), South Australian woman cricketer
- Theodor Rudolph Joseph Nitschke (1834–1883), German botanist
