= Manfred Niekisch =

German biologist (1951–2024)

- Born: 14 July 1951; Nuremberg, Bavaria, West Germany
- Died: 11 November 2024 (aged 73)
- Education: University of Cologne
- Known for: Promoting international approaches of nature conservation
- Scientific career
- Fields: Biology, zoo director
- Workplaces: University of Frankfurt

Manfred Niekisch (14 July 1951 – 11 November 2024) was a German biologist. He was professor for international nature conservation and director of Frankfurt Zoo (2008–2017).

== Life and career ==
Manfred Niekisch studied biology at the University of Cologne and obtained his PhD (Dr. rer. nat.) at the University of Bonn with a study on the dispersal strategies of the yellow-bellied toad (Bombina variegata).

From 1983 to 1989 he was director for species conservation of World Wildlife Fund Germany and the Wildlife Trade Monitoring Network TRAFFIC. Between 1989 and 1998 he was executive director of OroVerde, Foundation for tropical forests. In 1998 he became professor for International Nature Conservation at the University of Greifswald. This is the only university chair in German-speaking countries for international aspects of conservation.

In March 2008 he became director of Frankfurt Zoo. At the University of Marburg, the University of Hanoi, Vietnam and the Universidad Internacional de Andalucía in Baeza, Spain, he was lecturing on topics of international nature conservation.

In 2010 he became professor for international nature conservation at Goethe-University Frankfurt.

His scientific interests was both in strategies and instruments for the sustainable use of natural resources, aiming especially the conservation of biological diversity.

Niekisch was the author or co-author of numerous publications. He was co-editor of the Journal for Nature Conservation (Elsevier) of ECNC. Niekisch local focus is on Vietnam and the countries of Latin America.

Niekisch died on 11 November 2024, at the age of 73.

== Memberships ==
Niekisch was active in many voluntary functions, among others he was President of the German Society for Tropical Ecology (gtö). He was vice-president of the Frankfurt Zoological Society (FZS) and Chairman of the foundation OroVerde.

== Publications (selection) ==
- 2010: International conservation policy and the contribution of the zoo and aquarium community. – In: DICK, G. & M. GUSSET (Ed.): Building a Future for Wildlife. Zoos and Aquariums Committed to Biodiversity Conservation. S. 45–48, Gland
- 2008: Vorwort. – In: WWF Artenschutz. Die bedrohten Tiere der Erde. – White Star Verlag, Wiesbaden
- 2008: Aspirations and realities of the Biodiversity Convention. – Rural 21 The International Journal for Rural Development, Vol. 42 no. 2, S. 8–10. Frankfurt
- 2006: Countdown 2010. Schutz der biologischen Vielfalt. – Grünbuch Europa, Politische Ökologie 102–103, S. 49-52
- 2006: Marketing concepts for global conservation. – World Association of Zoos and Aquariums (Ed.): Proceedings of the 5th International Conference on Zoo Marketing and Public Relations, S. 34–36. Bern
- 2006: IUCN's Countdown 2010 Initiative. – World Association of Zoos and Aquariums (Ed.): Proceedings of the 5th International Conference on Zoo Marketing and Public Relations, S. 19–20. Bern
- 2002: CITES-Artenschutzkonferenz: Perspektiven für die Zukunft. - EU-Rundschreiben, Ausgabe 11/12.02, Dezember 2002, S. 10 - 12
