= Nikishin =

Nikishin (Russian: Никишин) is a Russian masculine surname, its feminine counterpart is Nikishina. It may refer to

- Alexander Nikishin (born 2001), Russian hockey player
- Bohdan Nikishyn (born 1980), Ukrainian fencer
- Evgenii Nikishin (1945–1986), Russian mathematician
- Svetlana Nikishina (born 1958), Russian volleyball player
- Viktoria Nikishina (born 1984), Russian foil fencer
- Yevgeni Nikishin (1904–1965), Russian football player
