= Karl Wilhelm Nitzsch =

German historian (1818–1880)

Karl Nitzsch
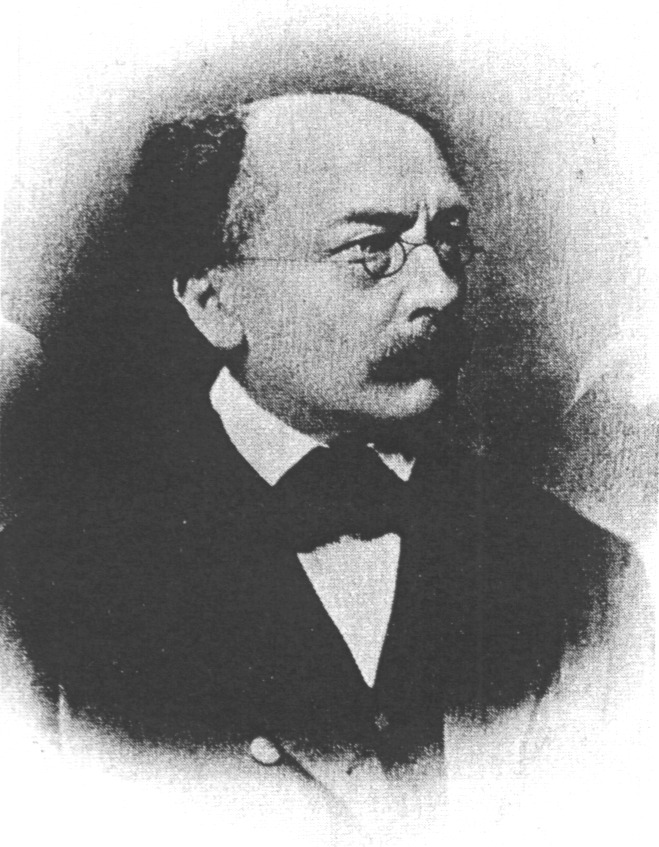
- Born: 22 December 1818; Zerbst, Duchy of Anhalt
- Died: 20 June 1880 (aged 61); Berlin, German Empire
- Father: Gregor Wilhelm Nitzsch

Academic background
- Education: Kiel University (PhD)

Academic work
- Discipline: History
- Institutions: Kiel University; University of Berlin; University of Königsberg

Karl Wilhelm Nitzsch (22 December 1818 – 20 June 1880) was a German historian known for his studies of ancient Rome and medieval Germany. He was the son of classical philologist Gregor Wilhelm Nitzsch (1790–1861).

In 1842, he received his doctorate from the University of Kiel with a dissertation involving the Greek historian Polybius. Following graduation, he took an extended study trip to Italy (1842–1843). In 1848, he became an associate professor at Kiel, where in 1858 he was named a full professor of history. Later, he was a professor of history at the Universities of Königsberg (from 1862) and Berlin (from 1872).

== Main works ==
- Polybius. Zur geschichte antiker politik und historiographie, 1842 – "Polybius. On the history of ancient politics and historiography.
- Die Gracchen und ihre nächsten Vorgänger vier Bücher römischer Geschichte, 1847 – The Gracchi and their closest predecessors, Four books on Roman history.
- Vorarbeiten zur Geschichte der Staufischen Periode, 1859 – Preliminary work on the history of the Hohenstaufen period.
- Ministerialität und bürgerthum im 11. und 12. jahrhundert, 1859 – Ministeriality and bourgeoisie in the 11th and 12th centuries.
- Die römische Annalistik von ihren ersten Anfängen bis auf Valerius Antias, 1873 – The Roman Annalists; from their beginnings up until Valerius Antias.
- Nordalbingische studien, 1874 – Nordalbingian studies.
- Deutsche Studien. Gesammelte Aufsätze und Vortäge zur deutschen Geschichte, 1879 – German studies, collected essays and lectures on German history.
- Geschichte des deutschen Volkes bis zum Augsburger Religionsfrieden, 1883 – History of the German people up until the Peace of Augsburg.
- Geschichte der römischen republik, 1884 – History of the Roman Republic.
- Books about Karl Wilhelm Nitzsch:
- Karl Wilhelm Nitzsch : die methodischen Grundlagen seiner Geschichtschreibung : ein Beitrag zur Geschichte der Geschichtswissenschaft, 1912 (by Herbert Merzdorf) – Karl Wilhelm Nitzsch: the methodological foundations of his historical writing: a contribution to the history of historical science.
