= Nietzsche-Haus, Naumburg =

Coordinates: 51.15004°N 11.81256°E

Nietzsche-Haus
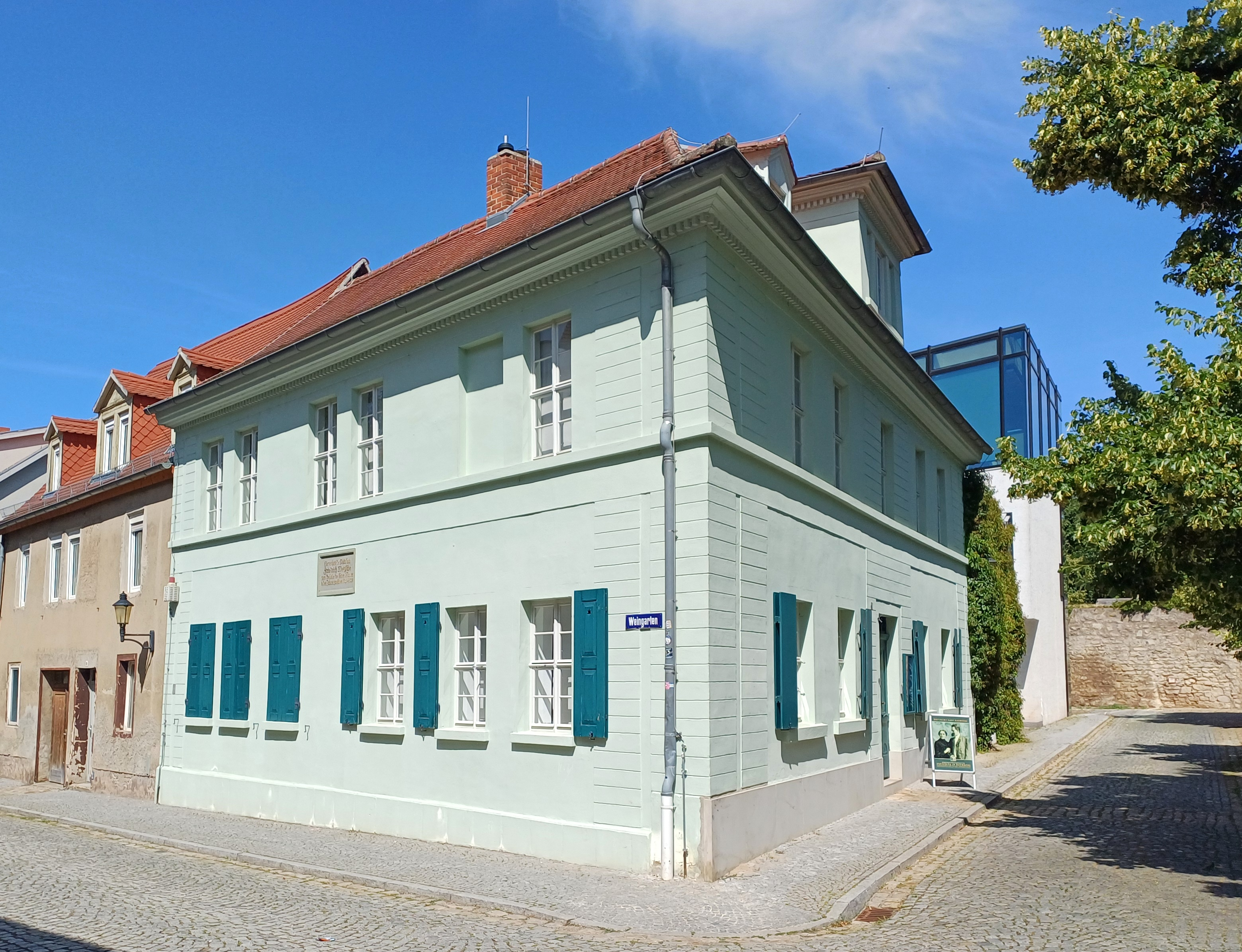
- The Nietzsche House in Naumburg
- Website: nietzschehaus.de

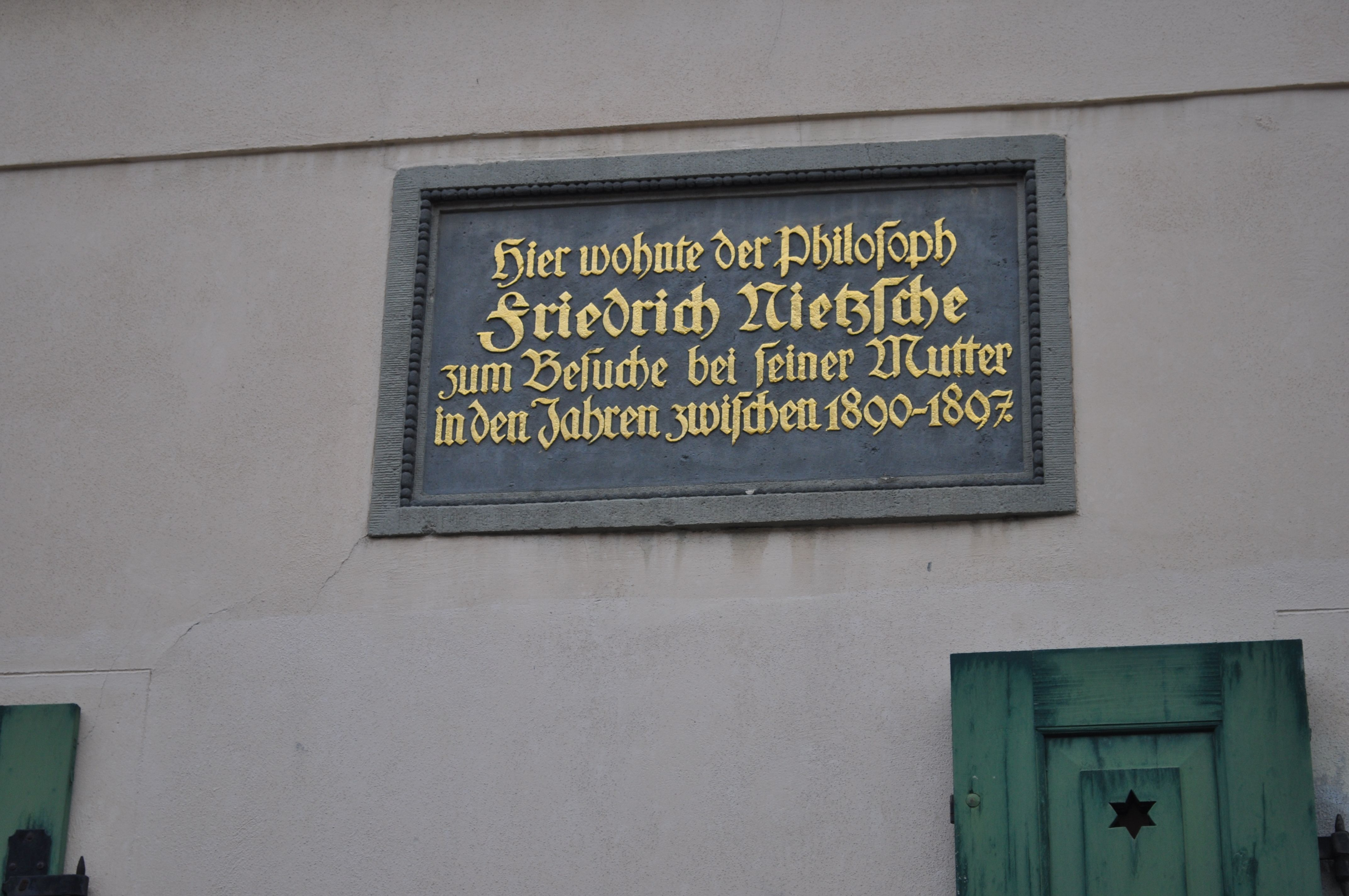
Inscription: "The philosopher Friedrich Nietzsche lived here visiting his mother between 1890 and 1897"

The Nietzsche-Haus in Naumburg, Germany, is a building dedicated to the life and work of the German philosopher Friedrich Nietzsche.

== History ==
In the summer of 1858, Nietzsche's mother, Franziska Nietzsche, moved with her two children, Elisabeth and Friedrich, to 18 Weingarten in Naumburg, the site of the Nietzsche-Haus. She rented a bright, spacious apartment on the upper floor. In 1878, she bought the house and continued to live there until her death in 1897.

== Modern use ==
Since 1994, the Nietzsche-Haus has been open to the public as a museum. The philosopher's life and work are documented in a permanent exhibition, while the house library in the exhibition rooms offers visitors the opportunity to learn about Nietzsche's work.

In October 2010, the "Nietzsche Documentation Center" (Nietzsche Dokumentationszentrum) was opened. The building was constructed immediately next to the Nietzsche-Haus following an international architectural design competition by the city of Naumburg won by the Weimar architectural firm KGB Architekten Kirchmeier, Graw, Brück. It is a modern, cubist glass building that stands out clearly from the rest of the buildings in the historic city center. An internal courtyard connects the two houses.

The Documentation Center is dedicated to research and critical examination of the influence and reception of Friedrich Nietzsche's thought. Once a year in October, philosophers from all over the world meet. During the four days of the Nietzsche Congress, specific themes related to the philosopher's work will be presented and discussed.

The museum is included in the Blaubuch (Blue Book) of the cabinet of Germany, as an important cultural site.

== See also ==
- Nietzsche-Haus, Sils-Maria
