= Karl Immanuel Nitzsch =

German theologian (1787–1868)

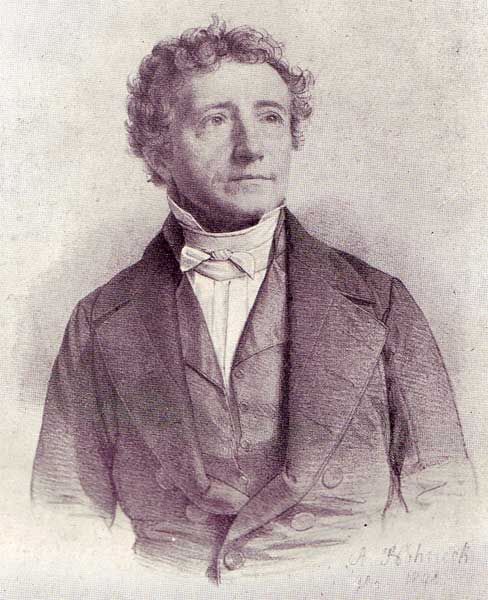
Karl Immanuel Nitzsch in 1842

Karl Immanuel Nitzsch (21 September 1787 – 21 August 1868) was a German Lutheran theologian. He represented the Vermittlungstheologie school of theology.

He was the brother of Gregor Wilhelm Nitzsch and the father of theologian Friedrich August Berthold Nitzsch.

== Biography ==
He was born in the small Saxon town of Borna near Leipzig. His father, Karl Ludwig Nitzsch, at that time pastor and superintendent in Borna, later (1790) became professor at Wittenberg and director (1817) of the seminary for preachers. He was sent to study at Schulpforta in 1803, going on to the University of Wittenberg in 1806. In 1809 he graduated, and in 1810 he became a privatdozent at the university. Having become a deacon at the Schlosskirche in 1811, he showed remarkable energy and zeal during the bombardment and siege of the city in 1813. In 1815 he was appointed a preceptor in the preachers' seminary which had been established at Wittenberg after the suppression of the university.

From 1820 to 1822 he was superintendent in Kemberg, and in the latter year he was appointed professor ordinarius of systematic and practical theology at Bonn. Here he remained until called to succeed Philip Marheineke at Berlin in 1847; subsequently he became university preacher, rector of the university, provost of St Nicolai (in 1854) and member of the supreme council of the church, in which last capacity he was one of the ablest and most active promoters of the Evangelical Union.

He died in Berlin.

== Published works ==
Nitzsch's principal works are: System der christlichen Lehre (1829; 6th edition, 1851; English translation: System of Christian doctrine 1849), Praktische Theologie (1847–1860; 2nd edition, 1863–1868), Akademische Vorträge über christliche Glaubenslehre (1858), and several series of sermons. According to Otto Pfleiderer, (Development of Theology, p. 123): "He took as his starting-point the fundamental thought of Schleiermacher, that religion is not doctrine but life, direct consciousness, feeling. At the same time he sought to bring religious feeling into closer connection with knowledge and volition than Schleiermacher had done; he laid special stress – and justly – on the recognition of a necessary and radical union of religion with morality, treating both dogmatics and ethics together accordingly in his System der christlichen Lehre". His Protestantische Beantwortung, a reply to the Symbolik of Johann Adam Möhler (1796–1838), which originally appeared in the Studien und Kritiken, of which he was one of the founders, may also be mentioned.
