= Nitsche =

Nitsche is a surname. Notable people with the surname include:

- Dominik Nitsche (b. 1990), German professional poker player
- Joachim Nitsche (1926–1996), German mathematician
- Erik Nitsche (1908–1998), American graphic designer
- Francisco Nitsche (1930–2018), Chilean footballer
- Franz Nitsche (b. 1951), Austrian rower
- Heino Nitsche (1949–2014), German-American nuclear chemist
- Hinrich Nitsche (1845–1902), German zoologist
- Paul Nitsche (1876–1948), German psychiatrist executed for crimes against humanity
- Robert Lehmann-Nitsche (1872–1938), German anthropologist

== See also ==
- Friedrich Nietzsche, whose last name is sometimes misspelt "Nitsche".
- Nietzsche (disambiguation)
