= Nitzschke =

Nitzschke is a surname. Notable people with the surname include:

- Dale F. Nitzschke (1937–2024), American academic
- Ulrich Nitzschke (1933–2013), German boxer
