= Johann Christian Wernsdorf =

German writer, poet, and rhetorician (1723–1793)

Johann Christian Wernsdorf I (6 November 1723, Wittenberg – 25 August 1793, Helmstedt) was a German writer, poet, and rhetorician.

== Life ==
Born the son of Gottlieb Wernsdorf the Elder and his wife Magaretha Katharina (nee Nitsch), he lost his father at an early age. He was his mother's caregiver afterward. He was educated by private tutors visiting Wittenberg Latin school, and afterwards studying at the Pforta school.

Here he was trained in particular by Friedrich Gotthilf Freitag, from whom he gained insight into the Greek and Roman writers. He was especially attracted to German and Latin literature, and he wrote his own Latin verse. On October 4, 1741, he enrolled at Martin Luther University of Halle-Wittenberg, where, after earning a "Magister" degree (equivalent to a modern Master's degree) on April 30, 1744, in the following year, on October 17, 1745, he acquired a teaching license.

During this period he held lectures, and on July 9, 1750 became an adjunct professor added to the philosophical faculty. During this time he undertook, as was customary, an educational trip and returned on October 4, 1791. At the instigation of Old testament scholar Johann Gottlob Carpzov, he was appointed by Charles I, Duke of Brunswick-Wolfenbüttel in autumn 1752 to the faculty of the University of Helmstedt, where he remained as a professor of rhetoric and poetry until his death in 1793.

Helmstedt offered him no favorable environment, however. Since the founding of the University of Göttingen in 1734, a large loss of students had gone hand in hand. The Greek language was heard only in connection with theology, while the Latin curriculum was still treated as a scholarly language.

Even still, Wernsdorf's scholarly writings brought him a great deal of prestige. His Helmstedt lectures produced many poems, speeches, and dissertations, and he endeavored to distinguish philology from theology. His major work is an edition of Poetae latini minores in seven volumes. The first five volumes were published by Wernsdorf himself (Altenburg, 1780-1788, Helmstedt 1791), a sixth volume was published after his death by his son (Helmstedt, 1799). The seventh volume remained unpublished.

After the death of philologist Pieter Burman the Younger in 1778, Wernsdorf succeeded him as the editor of the Latin Anthology.

He had a daughter Louise, married to the German theologian Karl Ludwig Nitzsch, and a son Christian Gottlieb Wernsdorf.
