= Nikić =

Nikić (Serbian Cyrillic: Никић) is a South Slavic surname. It may refer to:

- Chris Nikic (born 1999), American amateur triathlete
- Goran Nikić (born 1969), Serbian footballer
- Miloš Nikić (born 1986), Serbian volleyball player
- Nikola Nikić (born 1956), Bosnian football manager
- Predrag K. Nikic, Yoga exponent
- Slobodan Nikić (born 1983), Serbian water polo player
- Mila Nikić (born 1993), 13th place entrant for Montesong 2025

== See also ==
- Nikisch
- Nikitsch, Burgenland
