= Karl Ludwig Nitzsch =

German theologian (1751–1831)

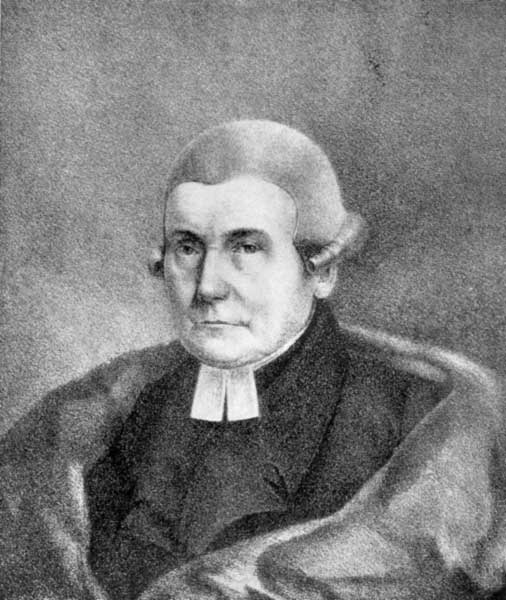
Karl Ludwig Nitzsch

Karl Ludwig Nitzsch (6 August 1751 – 5 December 1831) was a German Lutheran theologian, a professor of theology since 1790. He was the father of Karl Immanuel Nitzsch and Gregor Wilhelm Nitzsch.

== Biography ==
Grandson of Gregor Nitzsch and son of Wilhelm Ludwig Nitzsch, he was born in Wittenberg. He studied at the University of Wittenberg from 1770 to 1775. He later served as a pastor in the towns of Beucha (from 1781) and Borna (from 1785). In 1788, he became a superintendent and consistorial assessor in Zeitz. In 1790, he obtained his doctorate in theology and during the same year became a professor at the University of Wittenberg. He was married to Louise Wernsdorf, the daughter of German rhetorician Johann Christian Wernsdorf. He died in his home city of Wittenberg.

Like his son, the better-known Karl Immanuel Nitzsch, he earned some distinction in the theological world by a number of writings, including a work entitled De discrimine revelationis imperaboriae et didacticae prolusiones academicae (2 volumes, 1830). Theologically, he represented a combination of supernaturalism and rationalism (supernatural rationalism or a Kantian rational supernaturalism).

In addition to the aforementioned work, he was the author of:

- Ueber das Heil der Welt, 1817 – On salvation of the world.
- Ueber das Heil der Kirche, 1821 – On salvation of the church.
- Ueber das Heil der Theologie 1830 – On salvation of theology.

He died in Wittenberg.
