= Sybilla Nitsch =

German politician (born 1980)

Member of the Landtag of Schleswig-Holstein
- Incumbent
- Assumed office 7 June 2022

Personal details
- Born: 7 December 1980 (age 45)
- Party: South Schleswig Voters' Association (since 2012)

Sybilla Lena Nitsch (born 7 December 1980) is a German politician serving as a member of the Landtag of Schleswig-Holstein since 2022. She has served as chairwoman of the South Schleswig Voters' Association since 2025.
