= Friedrich August Berthold Nitzsch =

German theologian

Friedrich August Berthold Nitzsch (19 February 1832, Bonn – 21 December 1898, Kiel) was a German theologian.

The son of Karl Immanuel Nitzsch, he became professor ordinarius of theology at Gießen in 1868 and at Kiel in 1872. He was the author of Das System des Boethius ("The system of Boethius"; 1860) and Grundriss der christlichen Dogmengeschichte, t. I, Die patristische Periode ("Outline on the Christian history of dogma, part 1: The patrician era"; 1870), amongst other texts.
