= Landesausbau =

Medieval settlement processes

Landesausbau (literally "land development") refers to medieval settlement and cultivation processes in regions of Western Europe that were previously only sparsely populated or uninhabitable. By means of clearing of woods and drainage of wetlands, new agricultural areas and new settlement areas were created.

The processes of population expansion and resettlement led to an exchange of cultures and cultural diversity of languages, traditions and lifestyles. The Landesausbau changed the natural and cultural landscapes of Western Europe and continues to have an impact.

The terminology “inland colonization“ to describe the Landesausbau has raised controversies between historians because of the linguistic parallelism to modern colonialism.

== History ==
After an early phase of Landesausbau at the end of the 7th century, the land expansion and the establishment of new settlements increased from the 10th century onwards and reached its peak at the 12th century. It came to a halt at the 14th century because of natural catastrophes, the outbreak of the Black Plague and other crises that caused a steep decline in population.

As part of the Landesausbau in High Middle Ages, the Eastern settlement of peasants, craftsmen and merchants crossing the Eastern borders of the Holy Roman Empire took place. At the same time, the Normans settled in England and Southern Italy and the Crusaders expanded to the Iberian Peninsula.

During the intense phase of Landesausbau, the area that was settled and cultivated increased by a third. Cultivation and settlement were carried out by a multitude of ethnic groups and, in most cases, peacefully on the initiative of landowners and landlords. The settlement east of Elbe and Saale at the 12th century involved mainly Germans, the so-called ″coloni Theutonici″, extending the German-speaking lands to beyond the Oder to Pomerania, Silesia, Bohemia, Moravia, East Prussia and West Prussia. However, the Landesausbau also involved Slavs, such as in Masuria, and Flemish, Danish and other ethnic groups.

== Climatic conditions ==
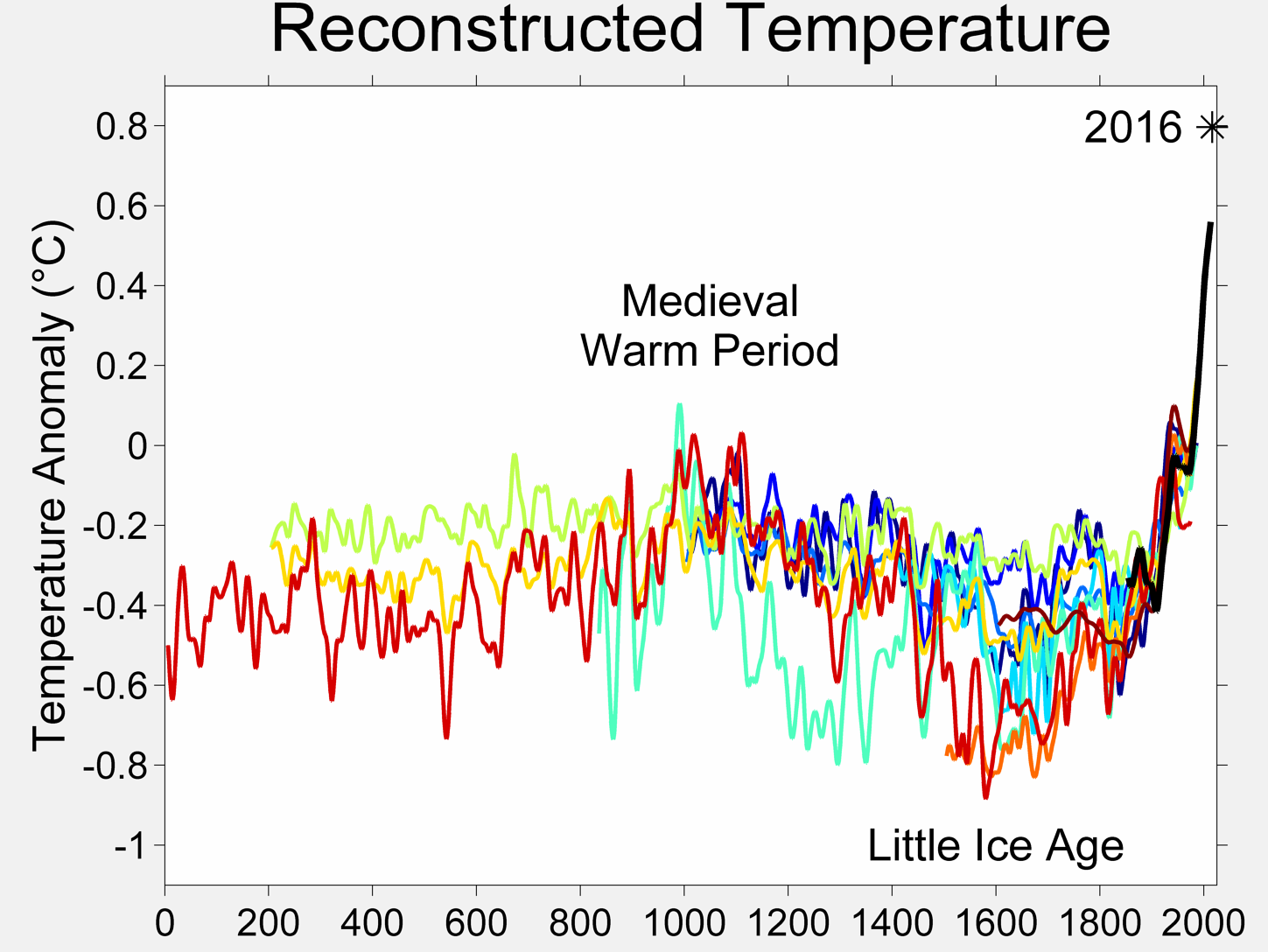
Northern Hemisphere temperature reconstructions for the past 2000 years

The Landesausbau was caused by several factors, including a moderate climate known as the Medieval Warm Period from about 950 to 1250, which resulted in a greater exploitation of the natural resources and in longer and more productive growing season.

== Technological innovations ==
Technological breakthroughs such as better harnessing material, including whippletrees, traces and dykes and mills went parallel with improved cultivation techniques, including selective cropping and grazing as well as crop rotation (the so-called three-field-rotation). They improved the supply of the population with food.

== Population growth ==
The population of Europe increased significantly at the High Middle Ages, but an extensive, almost deserted fallow land of forests and marshes was not cleared. Around 1300, the population of Europe is estimated to have reached a peak of as high as 70 million, and the population density reached a peak of over 20 inhabitants per square kilometre. The clearing of woods and the drainage of wetlands for the creation of new settlement and cultivation areas became necessary.

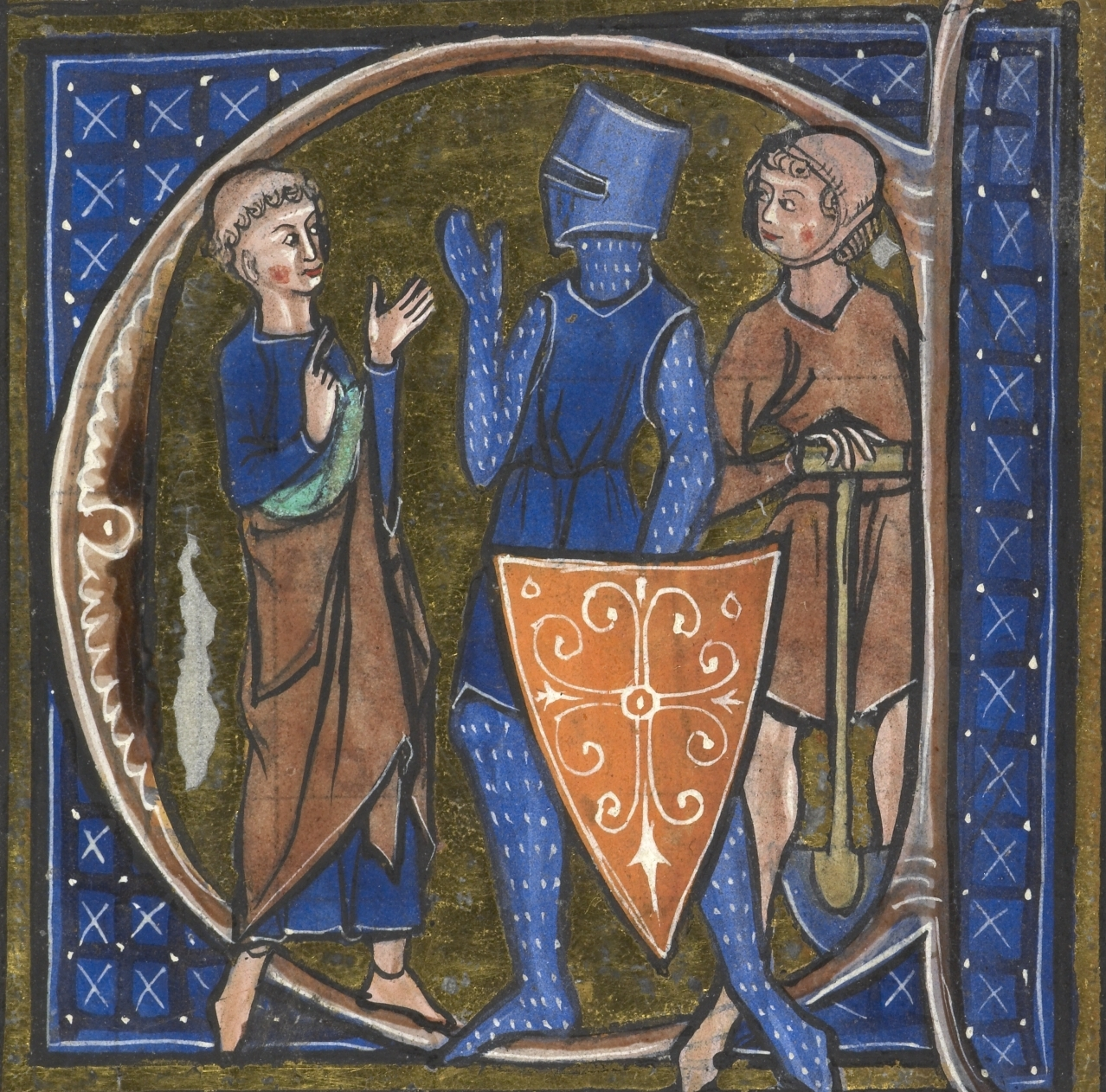
Medieval French manuscript illustration of the three classes of medieval society: those who prayed (the clergy), those who fought (the knights) and those who worked (the peasants).

== Social changes ==
The Landesausbau can also be seen in relation to the changing social pattern. The spread of a new money system in the 12th century, the birth of towns with market privileges, the creation of new distant trade routes to the Netherlands and Lombardy and intensive commercial relations all greatly increased the mobility of merchants and craftmen. The merchants and craftmen were attracted by privileges such as free trade and the heritable, interest-free ownership of their enclosed domiciles in urban centres.

At the same time, feudalistic structures were weakened and so the bonds of serfdom that tied peasants to the land diminished. The greater mobility contributed to the resettlement of the population, especially during High Middle Ages.

== See also ==
- High Middle Ages
- Cultural landscape
- Marshland colonization, Wetland settlement
