= Jan Bohls =

Jan Friedrich Wilhelm Bohls
- Born: 19 November 1863; Lehe, Bremerhaven, Free and Hanseatic City of Bremen
- Died: 3 April 1950 (aged 86); Lehe, Bremerhaven, Germany
- Known for: Zoology, Folkloristics, Heimatorschung

Jan (also: Johann) Friedrich Wilhelm Bohls (19 November 1863, Bremerhaven – 3 April 1950, Bremerhaven) was a German zoologist, independent scholar, folklorist and Heimatforscher.

== Life ==
Bohls was born in 1863 in Lehe, in the city of Bremerhaven, Germany, as the son of a farmer and lime kiln worker. He studied in the Rektorschule in Lehe and after in the Realgymnasium in Hildesheim. After finishing school, he studied botany, geology, paleontology and zoology, first at the University of Göttingen (where in 1884 he joined the Burschenschaft Holzminda), then intermittently at the Friedrich Wilhelm University of Berlin and the Ludwig-Maximilians-Universität München. After his return to the University of Göttingen, he did his doctorate under the advice of Ernst Ehlers. Afterwards, he became a private tutor for a family from Lehe living in Paraguay. There, he gathered linguistic information on indigenous peoples of the Gran Chaco and conducted zoological research, especially on ants, discovering several new species.

Bohls was a member of the Berlin Society for Anthropology, Ethnology, and Prehistory. After his return from South America, he became assistant at the Natural History Museum in Hamburg. In the mid 1890s, Bohls returned to his hometown, where he made acquaintance with the writer Hermann Allmers, who introduced him to the union of Männer vom Morgenstern. Together with Gustav von der Osten, he formed in 1898 a homeland association for the whole area between the mouths of the Elbe and Weser rivers. During this time, he also took an important role as a mediator in the beginnings of the German boat research.

Regarding the history of his homeland, Bohls made several discoveries. He examined an urn cemetery in Dingen near Wursten, where he excavated old Saxon vessels with Barbotine technique of Romanesque origin. In the Fickmühlen Forest, he uncovered a grave of the Stone Age. Bog body finds and an excavation of the gallows hill (German: Galgenberg) of Debstedt, which dates back to the Bronze Age, were other projects of his.

The finds of the homeland union of the Männer von Morgenstern were sold to the city of Geestemünde in 1902 and shown in the city's Morgenstern Museum from 1906 onwards. Bohls was the museum director until 1907. In order to make the accumulating findings available to the public, the Farmhaus Union of Lehe was founded in 1908 under the leadership of Bohls, creating the beginnings of the Speckenbüttel open-air museum, one of the oldest open-air museums in Germany. In 1909, the Geest House was inaugurated. Next to a mill, more and more buildings were built in the Speckenbüttel Park. In 1920, Bohls promoted the founding of the Lower German stage "Waterkant".
