= Rudelsburg =

Ruined hill castle in Germany

Coordinates: 51°06′33″N 11°42′25″E

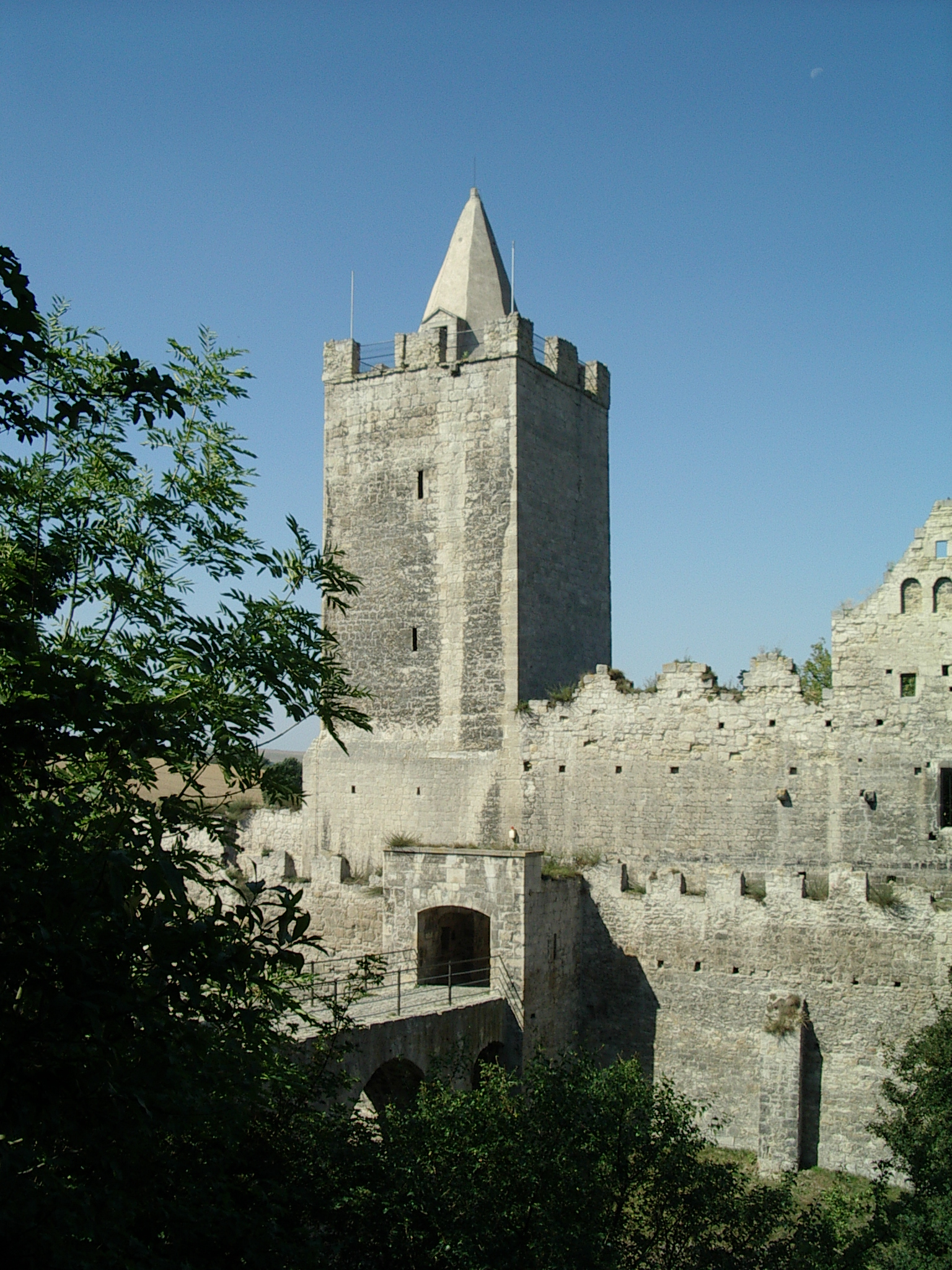

- Location within Germany Location within Saxony-Anhalt

General information
- Type: hill castle
- Architectural style: Romanesque
- Location: Naumburg, Germany

The Rudelsburg is a ruined hill castle located on the east bank of the river Saale above Saaleck, a village in the borough of Naumburg in the county of Burgenlandkreis in Saxony-Anhalt, Germany. The Rudelsburg was built in the Middle Ages by the Bishop of Naumburg and served to secure trade routes such as the Via Regia through the Saale Valley.

The Rudelsburg was a point of conflict between the bishops of Naumburg and the Margraves of Meissen belonging to the House of Wettin. The castle occasionally served various noble families as a residence, until it was destroyed in the Thirty Years' War and thereafter fell into disrepair. In the early 19th century the Rudelsburg became a popular tourist destination thanks to the romanticisation of mountains and the rise of hiking as a pastime. From 1855 onwards it achieved national renown as the annual meeting place of the Kösener Senioren-Convents-Verband, the oldest union of student fraternities with delegates from all German-speaking countries. The Rudelsburg still maintains a particular attraction for visitors and lies on the Romanesque Road (Ger:Straße der Romanik), a tourist route.

== Geography ==
Rudelsburg sits atop a rocky shell limestone ridge, approximately 85 metres (279 ft) above the river Saale and above Saaleck, a suburb of Bad Kösen in the Burgenlandkreis district in Saxony-Anhalt, Germany. Since 2010, the area has been part of the municipality of Naumburg.

== History ==
=== Prehistory: Early Bronze Age settlement ===
Archaeological finds seem to indicate that an early Bronze Age settlement existed on the site of the Rudelsburg, which has been attributed to the Unetice culture. The discovery of the Nebra sky disk attracted public attention to this prehistoric civilisation and its elevated culture and provoked interest in the settlements in the region of Saxony-Anhalt and Thuringia. The political, religious and economic importance of such settlements has not yet been established, but is the focus of intense research.

=== Military fortification and seat of nobility ===
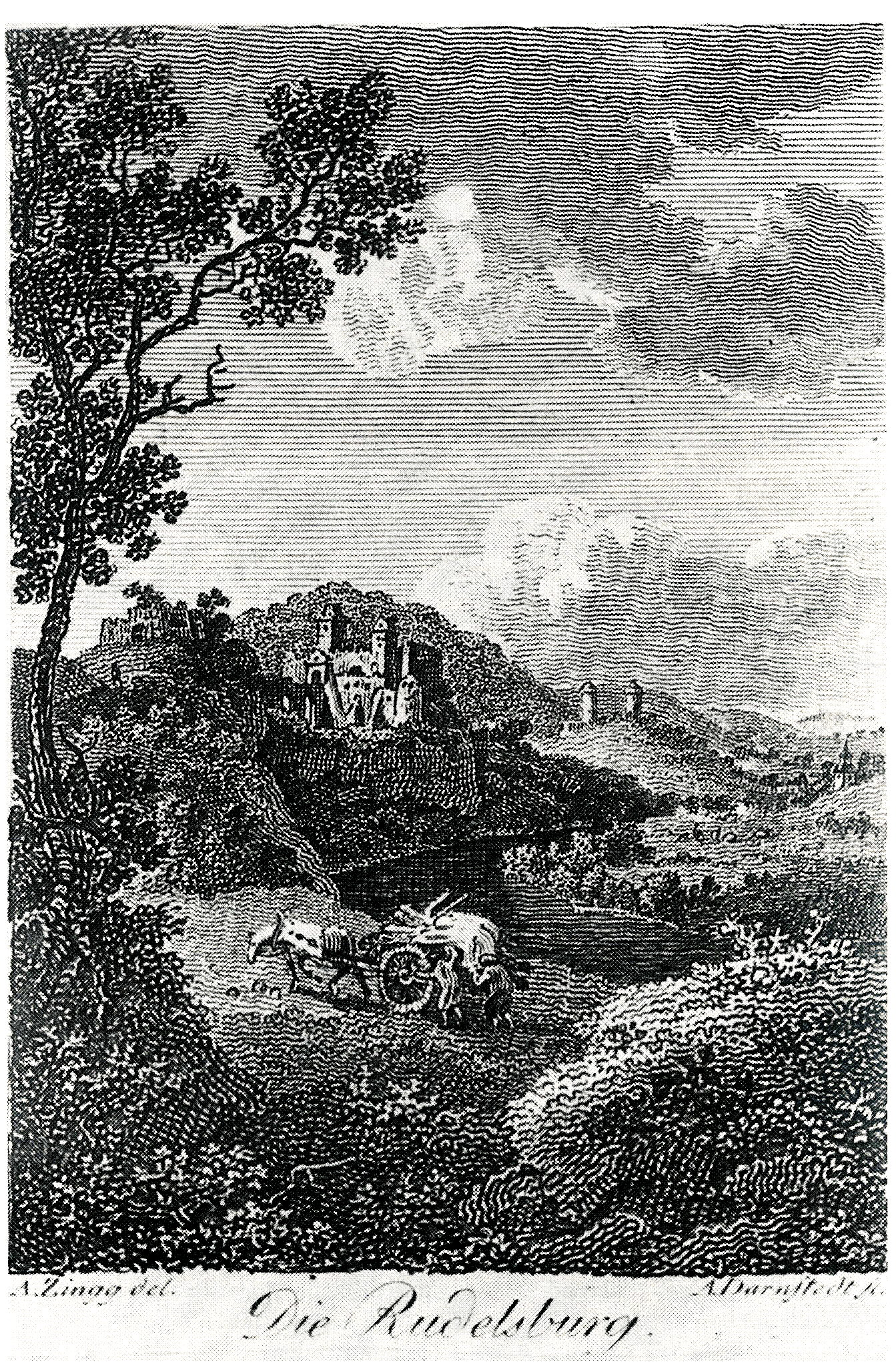
A well-known depiction with remains of the outer keep (before 1770)

The Rudelsburg castle was established in 1050 as a border fortification and was extended around 1150, with the addition of the central and outer keeps. Not far away on the western knoll is the ruin of Saaleck Castle. Rudelsburg was officially mentioned for the first time in 1171 under the name Rutheleibisberg.

Heinrich III, Margrave of Meissen, received the castle from the Bishop from Naumburg in 1238 as recompense for services to the church and installed there a number of families belonging to the nobility of service (retainers to a lord whose status was far above that of the peasantry but who nonetheless did not belong to the ranks of the high nobility). A source from 1271 names 12 different castellans. A priest is mentioned for the first time in 1293.

During a dispute with the noble Curtefrund, the citizens of Naumburg led by their captain Johann von Trautzschen laid siege to the Rudelsburg from 22 April to 30 July 1348. The sources relate that an “instrumentum” was brought to bear during the siege that could shoot Greek fire. This must have been some early form of gunpowder and is thought to be one of the first records of the use of firearms in a siege in Germany. The only earlier recorded use of ordnance dates back to the siege of the town of Meersburg on Lake Constance by Ludwig von Bayern in 1334. The oldest reports in all of Europe are from Italy (Florence 1326, Cividale 1331) and from the French fleet (1338-1346).

The citizens of Naumburg burnt down the Rudelsburg during their siege, and there were deaths and injuries on both sides. It seems that the castle was not rebuilt, as it is not mentioned in any official document for several decades after this event.

The next mention of the castle dates to 1383, when the Schenk family from Saaleck belonging to the House of Vargula are named as masters of the citadel, seated in Rottelsburg.

A loan certificate of the Dukes of Saxony, who belonged to the House of Wettin, dated 2 April 1441 names the brothers Rudolf, Günther and Heinrich von Bünau as the owners of the Rudelsburg. Apparently they owned no land other than that on which the castle stood.

During the fratricidal war between Friedrich and Wilhelm of Saxony, the Rudelsburg was besieged and destroyed for a second time in 1450. The inner keep was burnt to the ground during this incident.

At the division of the lands of the House of Wettin in 1485, the Rudelsburg was attributed to the Albertine line.

Rudolph von Bünau auf Teuchern and Günther von Bünau auf Gröbitz sold the Rudelsburg and the surrounding outworks to Hans Georg von Osterhausen in 1581 to cover their debts. The castle, which had been barely maintained until then, began to fall into decay during this period.

Although Groitzsch still describes the Rudelsburg as arx pulcherrima ("most beautiful castle") in his 1585 work Descriptio Salae fluvii eidemque adjacentium urbium, arcium etc. (Description of the river Saale and the surrounding towns, castles, etc.), a record from 1612 indicates that the lord marshal of Osterhausen employed a stonemason and a carpenter to provide "necessary support of the sagging beams, girders and rafters".

According to Osterhausen court records, a process was held at the Rudelsburg on 4 June 1616. At the time, a caretaker still lived in the castle, which was accessible via a narrow road. The courtyard was covered in grass. Besides a small room with a wooden pulpit, the usable remains of the castle included the dungeons with their very strong doors.

Towards the end of the Thirty Years' War in 1640, Swedish troops set fire to the Rudelsburg. Following this third destruction, the Rudelsburg was abandoned on 14 April 1641 and the inhabitants moved to the nearby Kreipitzsch property.

The nobles from Creutz(en) are believed to have been the owners of the Rudelsburg from 1671 to 1771. In 1690, they tried to establish the status of the (uninhabited) castle as a possession owing direct allegiance only to the emperor (Reichsunmittelbarkeit) in a court process in the imperial court in Wetzlar.

In 1770, the owner of the Rudelsburg ordered that the walls of the outer keep be torn down in order to reuse the stones for construction on the property, but a worker was permanently injured in an accident, and this was interpreted as a bad omen. The work was stopped. The outer keep was almost completely destroyed at this point in time, and it is probably only as a result of this accident that the ruined inner keep was preserved.

With the death of Friedrich Adolph von Creutz in 1774, the male line of the family was extinguished. This thwarted the plans to establish the Reichsunmittelbarkeit of the Rudelsburg.

In the following years, the counts from Zech and the counts from Brühl are named briefly as the owners of the Rudelsburg. The family von Schönberg bought the castle in 1797 and established an entailment, i.e. an indivisible trust that was designed to keep together the inheritance of the family.

=== The Rudelsburg as a destination for hikers and a tourist attraction ===
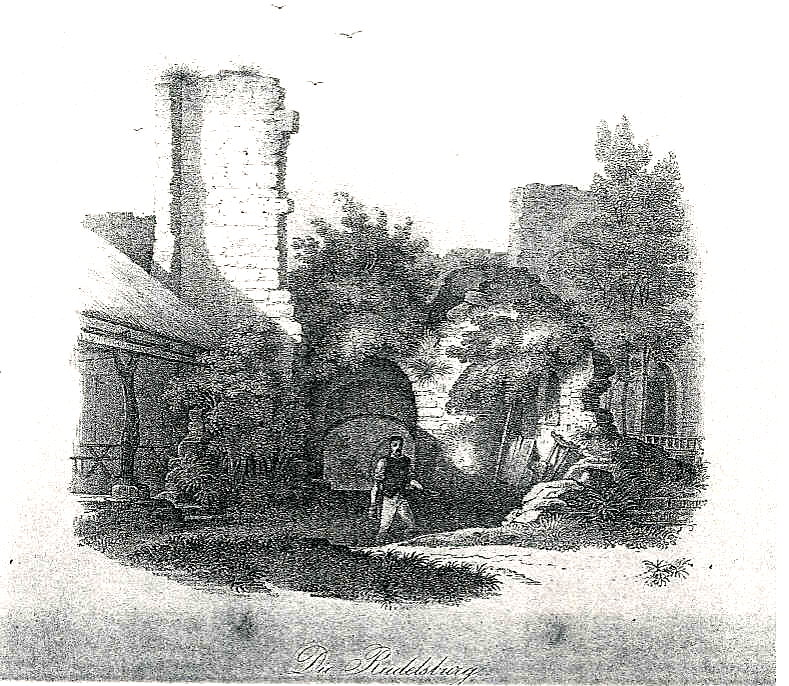
1849: Inner courtyard of the Rudelsburg with the first Rudelsburg innkeeper Gottlieb “Samiel” Wagner, to the left in the picture is the provisional straw roof that existed until 1853

In the 19th century, the Rudelburg became a meeting point for romantically-minded hikers, especially for students from Jena, Leipzig and Halle.

By this time, the castle was desolate, and devoid of all infrastructure. There was no entrance into the courtyard of the central keep and there were no sealed rooms, just rubble and debris. In 1818, the cantor emeritus, Johann Friedrich Förtsch, described the Rudelsburg as follows:

“The inner courtyard is covered in the rubble of the various ceremonial halls, chambers, weapon and storage rooms, kitchens, underground vaults, cellars and corridors, which have collapsed. It is thus impossible to say how everything used to be arranged.”

Nonetheless, ever more visitors came to the Rudelsburg. During the same period, the masters of the castle belonging to the family of the barons von Schönberg planted grapevines on the southern slope of the hill. One of the former vineyard workers, Gottlieb Wagner, known as “Samiel”, began to look after the ruins. From 1824 onwards, he offered food and drink from the Kreipitzsch property to visitors.

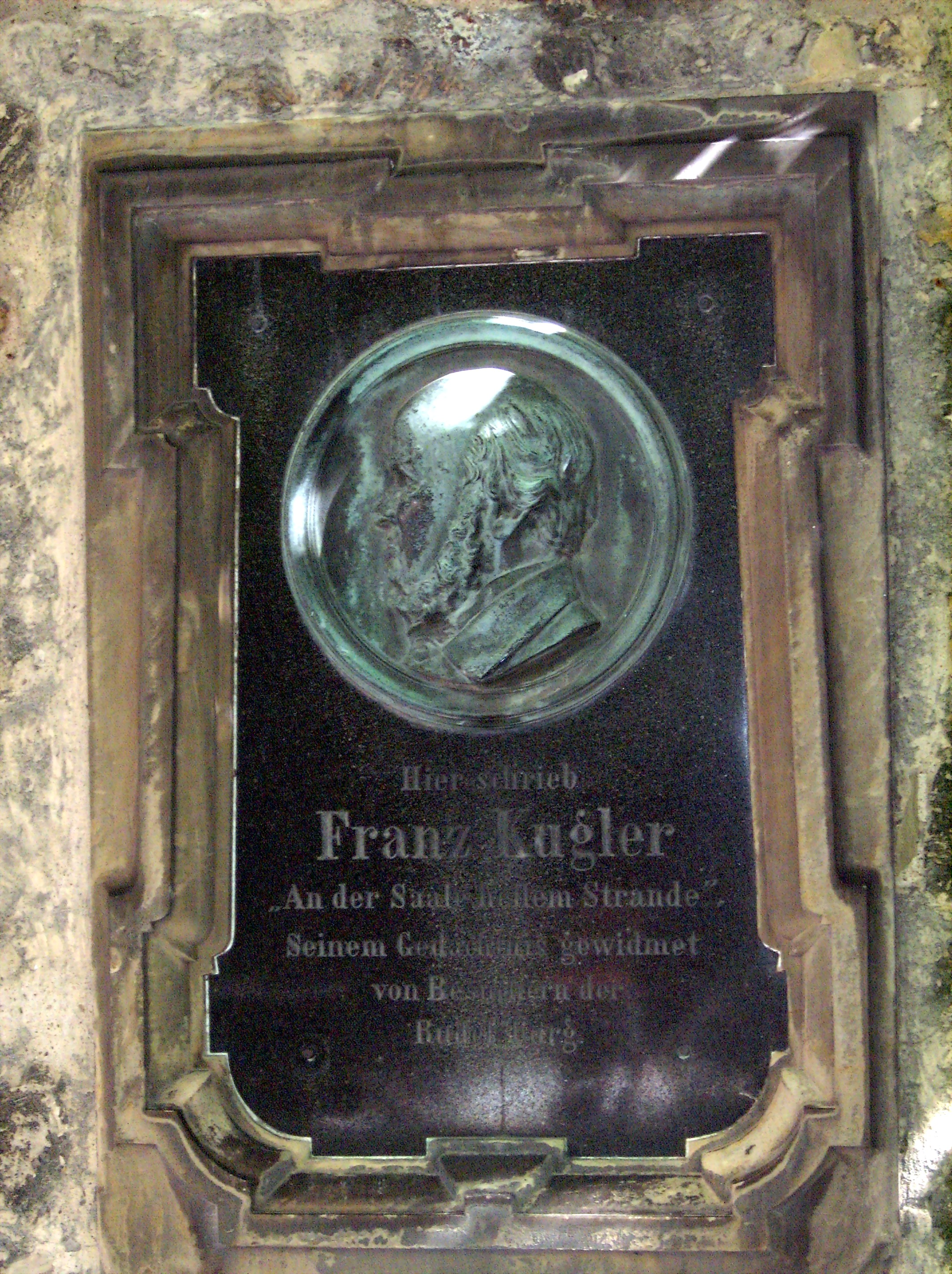
Franz Kugler

Franz Kugler, a student from Stettin studying in Berlin, composed the famous song An der Saale hellem Strande (On the bright bank of the Saale) whilst resting at the castle during a hike along the river in 1826:

On the bright bank of the Saale stand castles proud and bold, their roofs have fallen, and the wind blows through the halls, clouds float overhead.

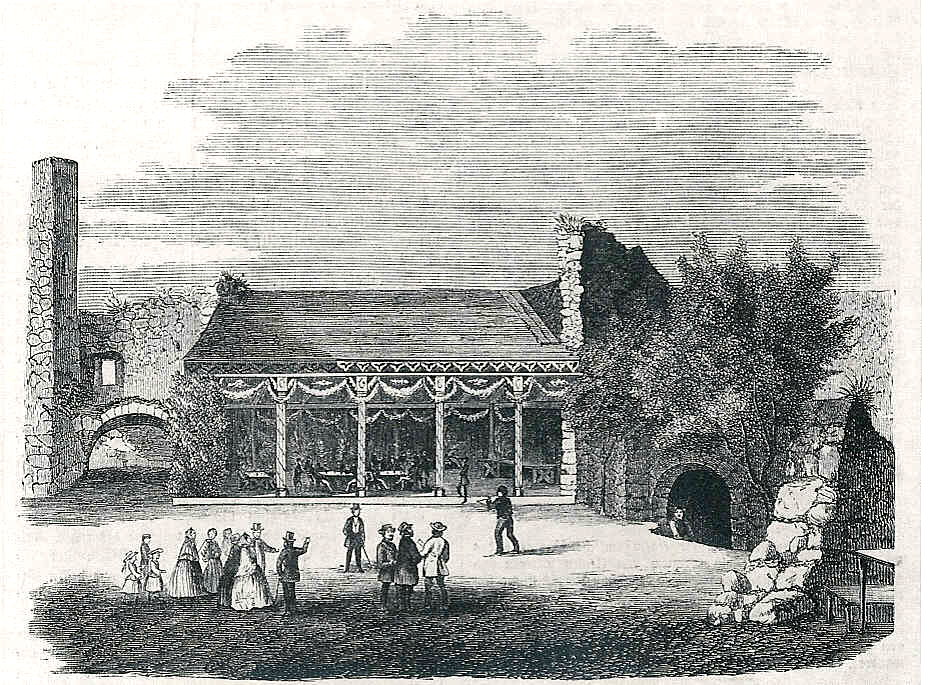
1856: Courtyard of the Rudelsburg with the drinking hall built in 1853

In this song, the castles on the Saale are decaying ruins that serve only to inspire the imagination. There is as yet no mention of drinking and celebrations or of the Rudelsburg as a venue for events.

The attractiveness of the castle rose however with the services offered by Wagner, so much so that the head of the district authorities in Naumburg asked Friedrich von Schönberg, the owner of the property, if it would be possible to open it officially for visitors. Consequently, a road was even built up to the castle.

Gottlieb Wagner opened the first tavern in the castle in time for Easter 1827, although it was only open on Sundays at first. When word got around about this development amongst the students in Jena, they marched on the Rudelsburg and, cheering loudly, occupied it for three days. The owner of the castle was honoured with a torchlight procession.

The completion of the Thuringian Railway in 1849, which improved the access to the Rudelsburg, coupled with the gastronomic offerings, further increased the attractiveness of the castle and brought in visitors from further abroad, including for example students from Leipzig and Halle an der Saale.

During a large-scale Prussian military exercise in the area in 1853, the provincial classes invited King Frederick William IV to breakfast at the castle. The drinking hall in the inner courtyard, which was built in the same year, is probably a product of this visit. The hall took the form of a roofed seating area that was open to the courtyard and replaced the old straw roof that had been held up by simple tree trunks.

=== The Rudelsburg as a venue and a symbol for students ===
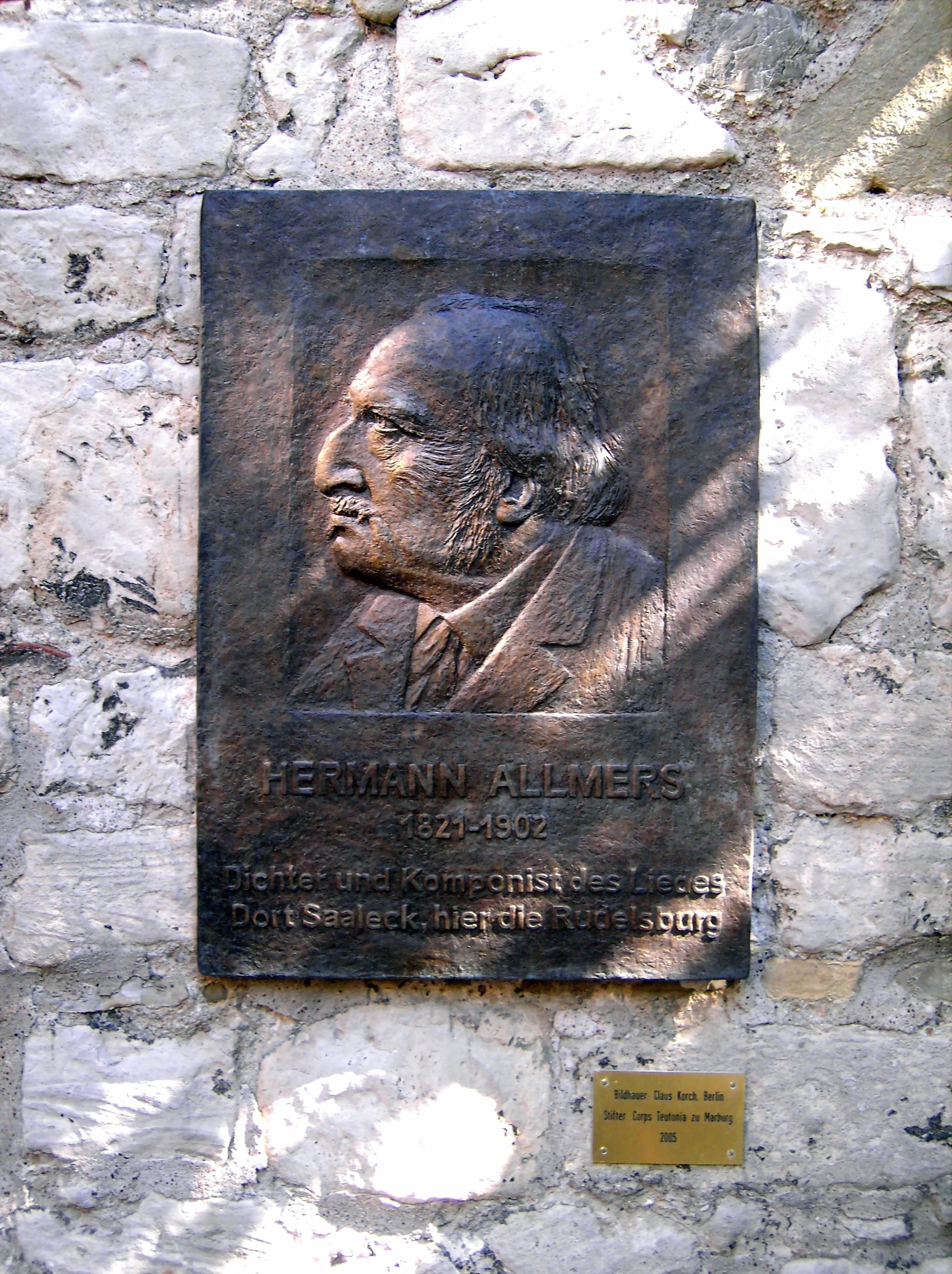
Hermann Allmers

In 1863, Hermann Allmers from Rechtenfleth near Bremen composed the student song Dort Saaleck, hier die Rudelsburg (There Saaleck, here the Rudelsburg). Although Allmers was himself not a student, he traveled with students in the Saale valley, and his song speaks of the new life within the walls of the castle.

There Saaleck, here the Rudelsburg, and deep down in the valley splashing between rocks the dear old Saale; and mountains here and mountains there, to the right and to the left - |: The Rudelsburg, that is a place for feasting and for drinking. :|	They know this too the students in Jena and in Halle and they drink there in the old way, in the yard and on the wall. surrounded by mossy stone, how the songs sound so fine! |: The Saale splashes so happily, the mountains echo. :|

In the middle of the 19th century, the Rudelsburg became a regular meeting point for students’ corps, whose umbrella organisation the Kösener Senioren-Convents-Verband (KSCV) had been founded in Jena in 1848, making it the oldest union of German student fraternities. The site of the KSCV's annual meeting was soon moved to Bad Kösen, and a meeting took place in the Rudelsburg for the first time in 1855. From this time until World War I, the Rudelburg served every year as a social meeting point during the annual meeting in Bad Kösen.

==== (Re-)construction under the Empire ====
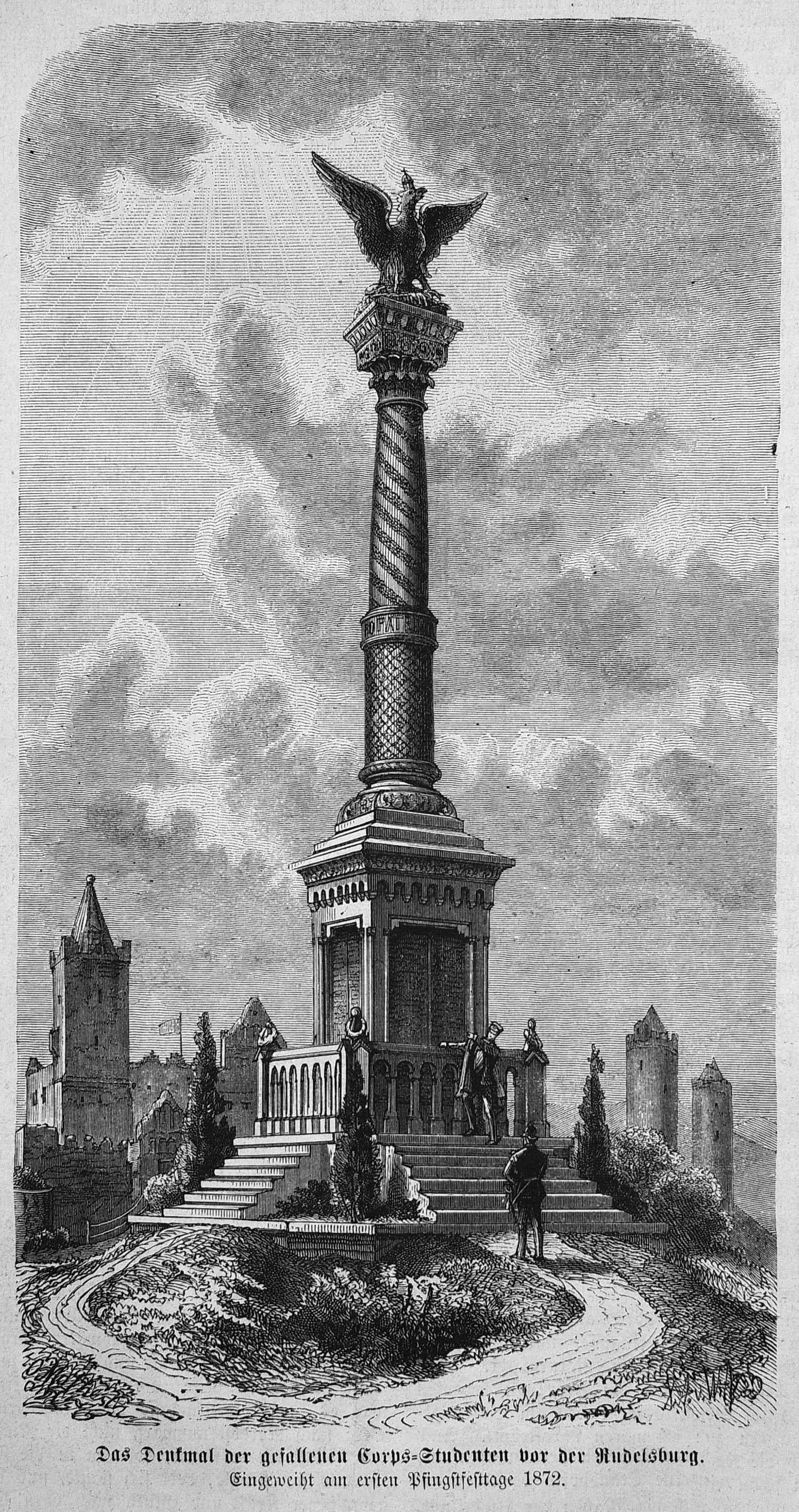
The Pillar to the Fallen at the Rudelsburg in 1872; lithograph after a drawing by Oskar Mothes

In 1867, following the celebration of the 800th anniversary of the restoration of the Wartburg, discussions began as to whether the Rudelsburg should also be restored. These discussions were further provoked by a storm in December 1868, which brought down parts of the perimeter walls. Work to restore the perimeter walls in the west and in the south began in 1870. The partial reconstruction of the castle began a year later under the leadership of the master builder, Werner, from Bad Kösen, using plans drawn up by the royal building officer in Saxony, Oskar Mothes. During these works, the entrance and the bridge were repaired. The knight's hall with its staircase and side room were restored. A large breach in the wall was closed in the north-eastern corner and windows were cut in the old northern wall. A canon that had been captured in the 1870-71 Franco-Prussian War was placed on the bridge. These works were complete by Easter 1872.

In 1872, the first monument erected by members of the students’ corps was unveiled. The Gefallenensäule (English: Pillar to the Fallen) was established in honour of those members who had fallen in the Franco-Prussian War. The Emperor William I Obelisk was unveiled in 1890, followed in 1896 by the Young Bismarck Memorial. The last of this first round of monuments was erected in 1926 in honour of those who fell in World War I.

(See below: Monuments)

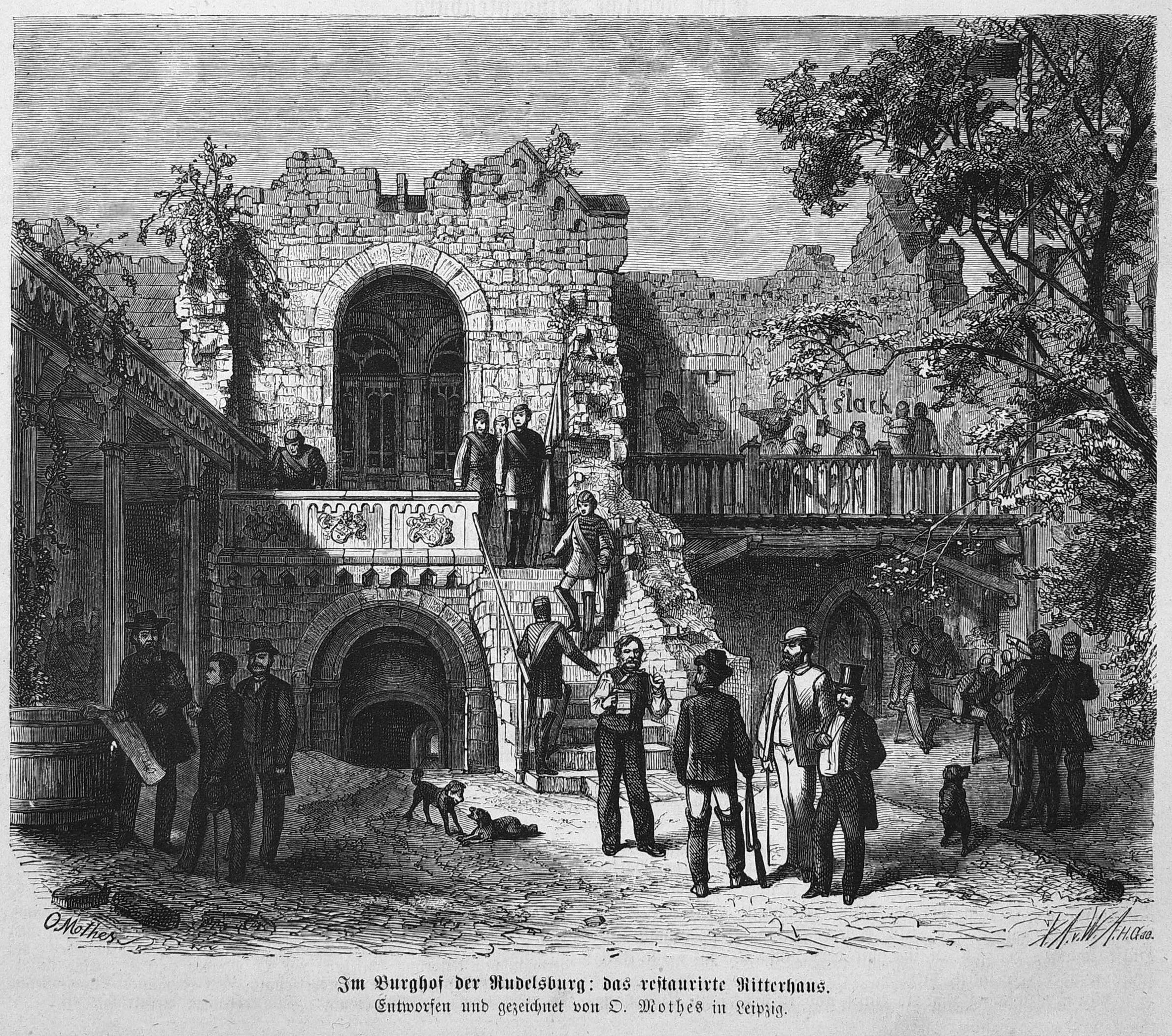
The courtyard of the Rudelsburg, Gottlieb Wagner is in the foreground with a beer mug in his hand; wood carving after a drawing by Oskar Mothes around 1872.

The partial reconstruction by Mothes, the founding of the German Empire in 1871 and the erection of the monuments in the area near the outer keep marked a completely new phase in the history of the Rudelsburg. While youthful appreciation of nature and the romantic scenery had been pivotal in the first half of the century, the Rudelsburg now became a symbol for the members of the KSCV. The KSCV was a strong ally of the state, which was reinforced by the membership of both of the most important political decision-makers of the time, Otto von Bismarck and Emperor Wilhelm II. With the founding of the Verband Alter Corpsstudenten (English: Federation of old members), the KSCV, which had until then only counted students amongst its members, had a new source of income in the form of contributions from the “old men”. The Rudelsburg became a platform for celebrations of the KSCV's new self-confidence. As a consequence, the annual meeting at the Rudelsburg became more sedate and ceremonial. Speeches held at the monuments and patriotic songs were fixtures in the annual Pentecost programme in the German Empire.

In the Empire and the Weimar Republic, life-size copies of the Rudelsburg monuments were made and sold to interested buyers in Germany and Austria. In 2007, these laboriously produced objects are still to be found from time to time in antique shops.

In 1913, Paul Schreckenbach wrote the historical novel The last Rudelsburger, which is set in the 14th century and which reflects the conservative Prussian values of his time.

==== Weimar Republic and National Socialism ====
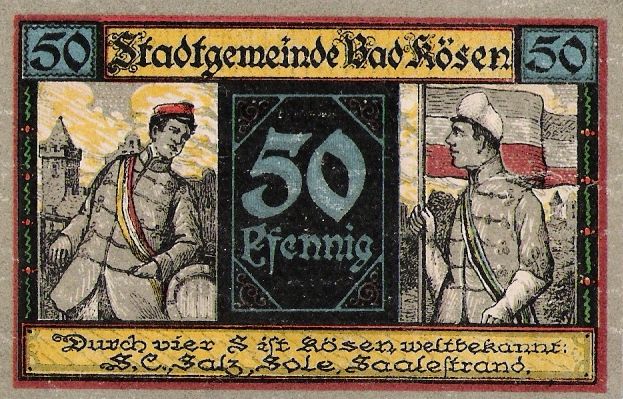
Notgeld issued by the town of Bad Kösen in 1921 with the Rudelsburg and students

There were no student meetings at the Rudelsburg during World War I, but the tradition was restarted after the end of the war. In 1926, the Löwendenkmal (English: Lion Monument) was unveiled with great pomp. This ceremony was seen as a symbol of the members of the students’ corps attachment to the old imperial system and was reported throughout Germany and beyond.

The last meeting of the KSCV at the Rudelsburg before World War II took place in 1934. The 1935 congress ended with the dissolution of the group by the National Socialists.

During World War II, there were efforts at some universities to re-establish individual student bodies in secret. These were to include the umbrella organisation, the KSCV. To this end, a meeting was organised at the Rudelsburg in 1944, which ended with a ceremonial drinking session. Because of the chaos in the last months of the war, neither this new founding nor the attraction of the Gestapo’s attention had serious consequences for those involved.

After the end of World War II, the Rudelsburg was part of the Soviet occupation zone and later the German Democratic Republic (GDR). The owner, a member of the nobility, lost his possessions, and the castle was attributed to the town of Bad Kösen.

==== In the GDR ====
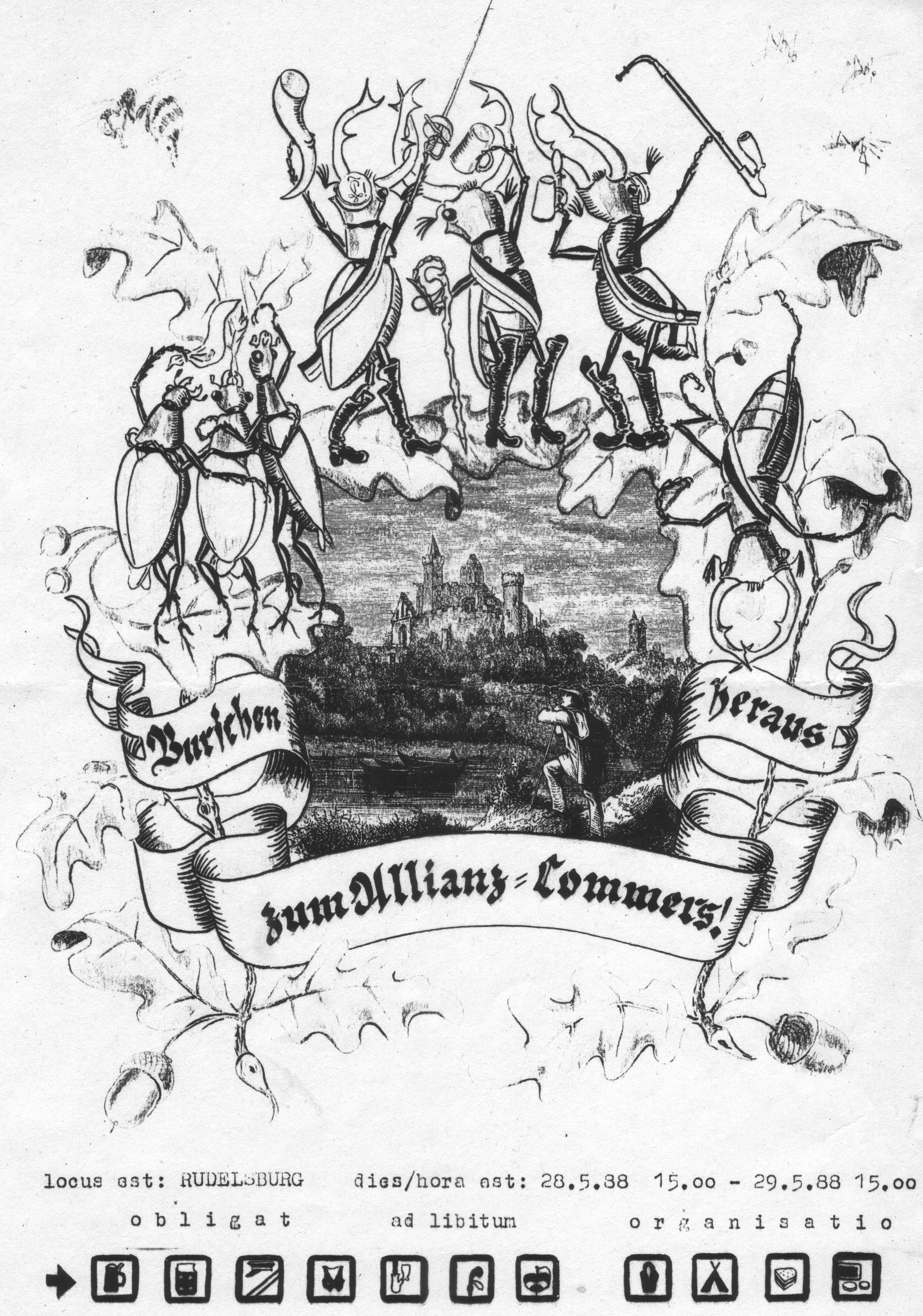
Invitation to the ceremonial drinking session of the GDR student fraternities at the Rudelsburg in 1988

The student organisations which found themselves on the territory of the GDR moved to the west. The KSCV’s congress was held from 1954 to 1994 in Würzburg, near to the Fortress Marienberg. The Rudelsburg and Bad Kösen were but a memory for the members of the students’ corps.

The Rudelsburg decayed further during this time, as did the monuments that had been erected there. Some larger metal pieces were melted down and reused.

As it was common to take the names of tourist attractions to designate products produced in a particular area, the name “Rudelsburg” was used to name a car radio produced in the state-owned radio factory in Halle and various products produced in the equally state-owned limestone factory in Bad Kösen.

The first attempts to revive the old student traditions began in the GDR in the 1960s. Much however had already been forgotten, and information and materials first had to be collected in secret. In the early years of the 1980s, the first new fraternities in the GDR were founded, at first secretly and then ever more openly. The Rudelsburg and other traditional meeting points featured in the plans of the GDR students.

On 20 June 1987, the fraternity Salana Jenensis organised the first ceremonial drinking session of the GDR student fraternities at the Rudelsburg. At the first such meeting, just 19 participants were present, some of whom had arrived by using rafts or bath tubs made of zinc to travel along the Saale. This was to be a reference to the tradition of boat trips on the Saale which can be seen in many old depictions. This ceremonial drinking session was the first officially registered traditional student meeting in the history of the GDR.

From this year on, the Rudelsburg was the annual meeting point for the student fraternities which had been founded in the GDR before 1990. In 1990, they joined in the Rudelsburg Alliance.

==== Reconstruction after German Reunification ====
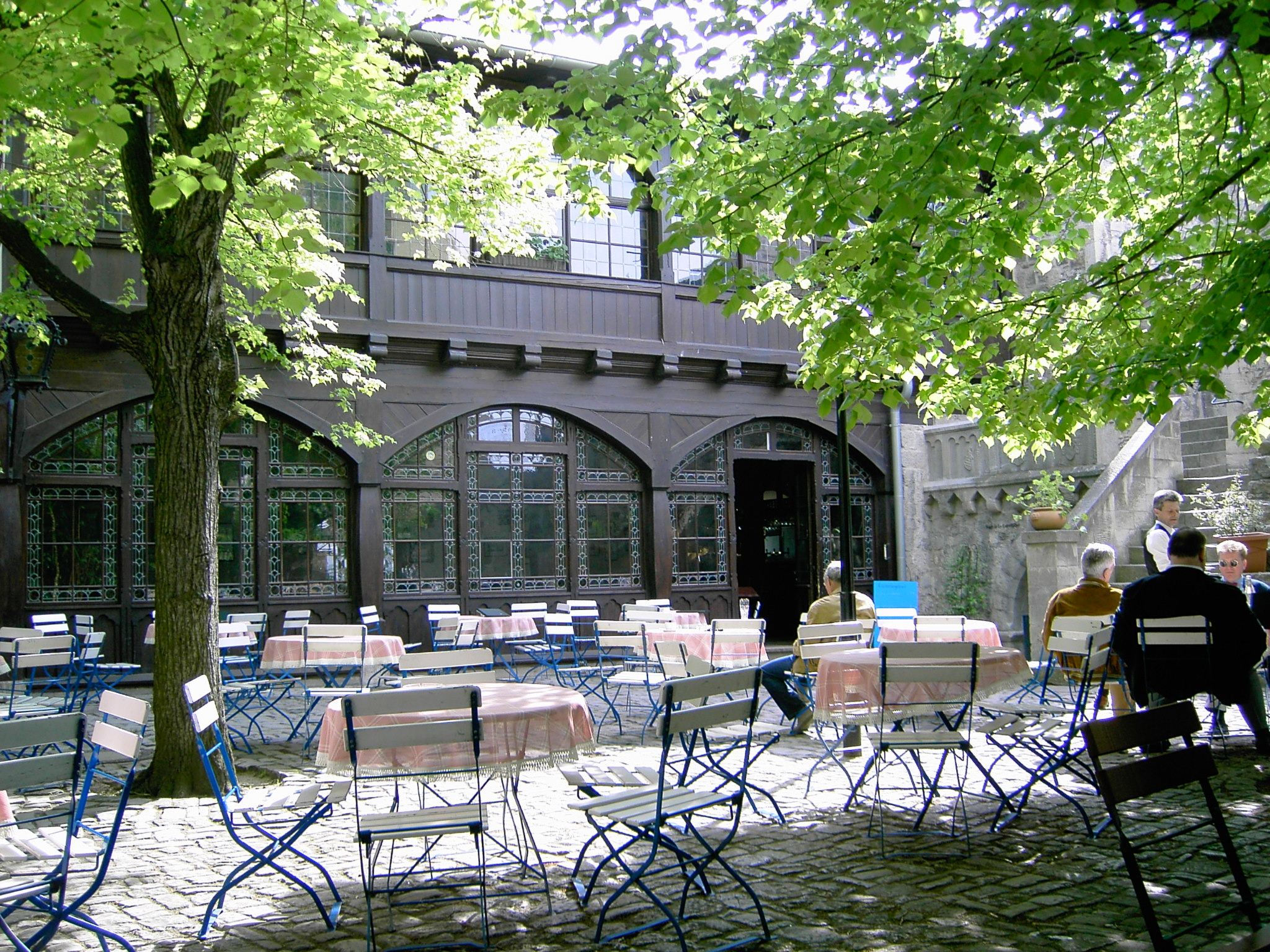
The courtyard today

In 1990 (sometimes even before German Reunification), the first student bodies began to return to their old university towns in the GDR. The first congress took place in Bad Kösen in 1995. The Rudelsburg was once again put to use for this purpose, which required extensive work to restore the castle. Bad Kösen's infrastructure also had to be upgraded, for the congress was now much larger than it had even been before the war.

The monuments at the Rudelsburg have also been successively restored since unification. These works have been financed by the KSCV, with donations from individual student bodies, but also with donations from individual members.

The song Dort Saaleck, hier die Rudelsburg is still used by members of both the KSCV and the Rudelsburg Alliance.

The Rudelsburg still hosts a restaurant. The inner area of the castle and the donjon are accessible during the opening hours of the restaurant and visitors have a view of the Saale valley from the donjon. In the lower rooms of the donjon, there are display windows with exhibits about the student organisations.

So that weddings may take place there, there is a civil registry office in the castle. The town Bad Kösen and the surrounding districts now market the castle as part of the “Thuringian Toscana”, including the nature reserve Saale-Unstrut-Triasland.

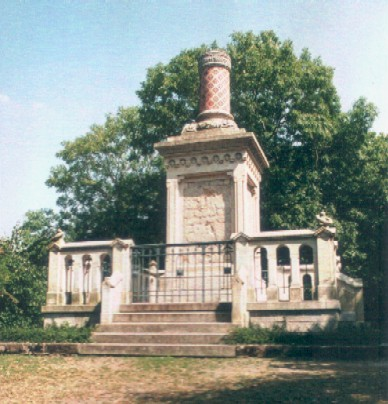
Pillar to the Fallen

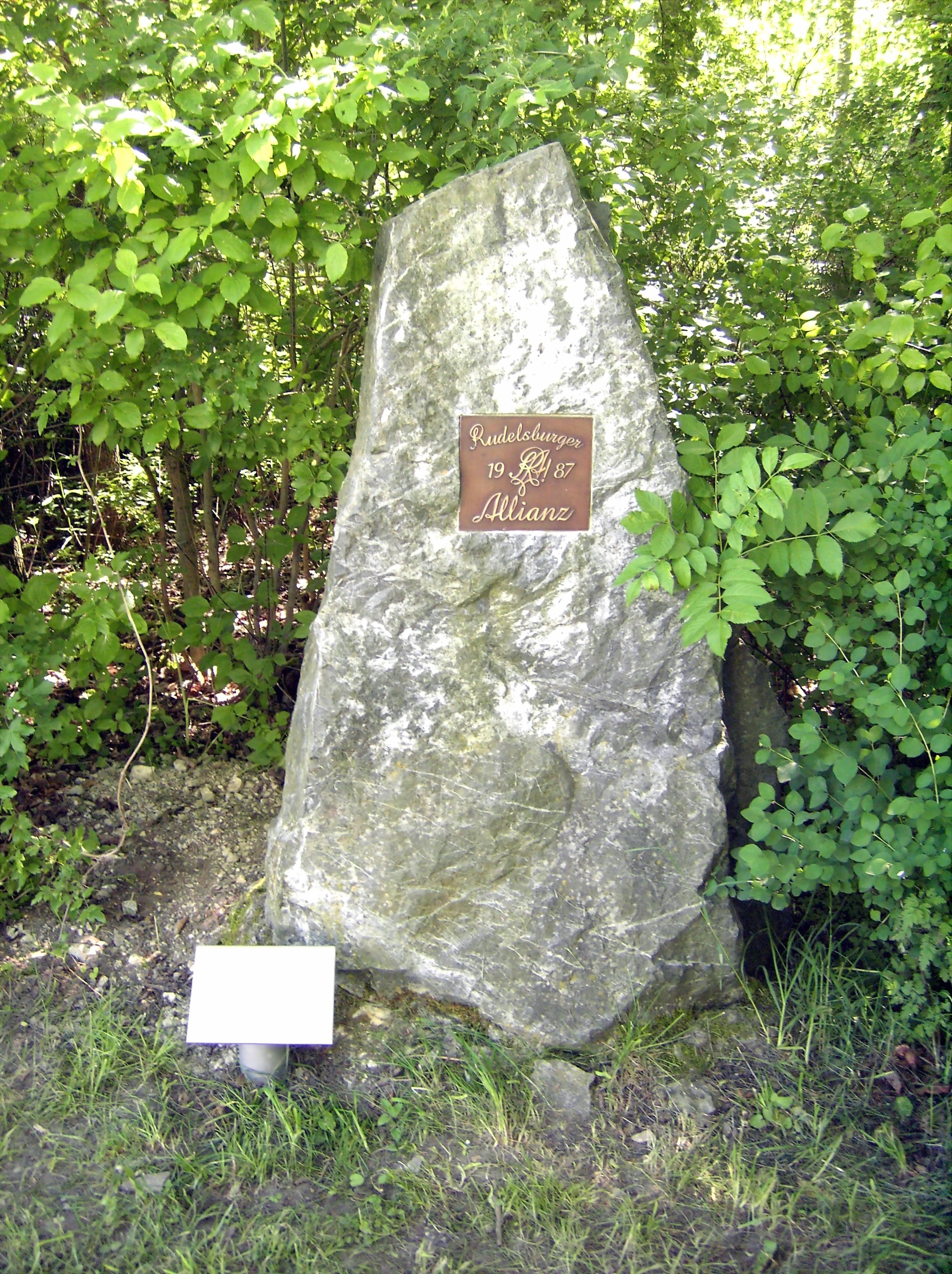
Alliance Stone at the Rudelsburg

== Description ==
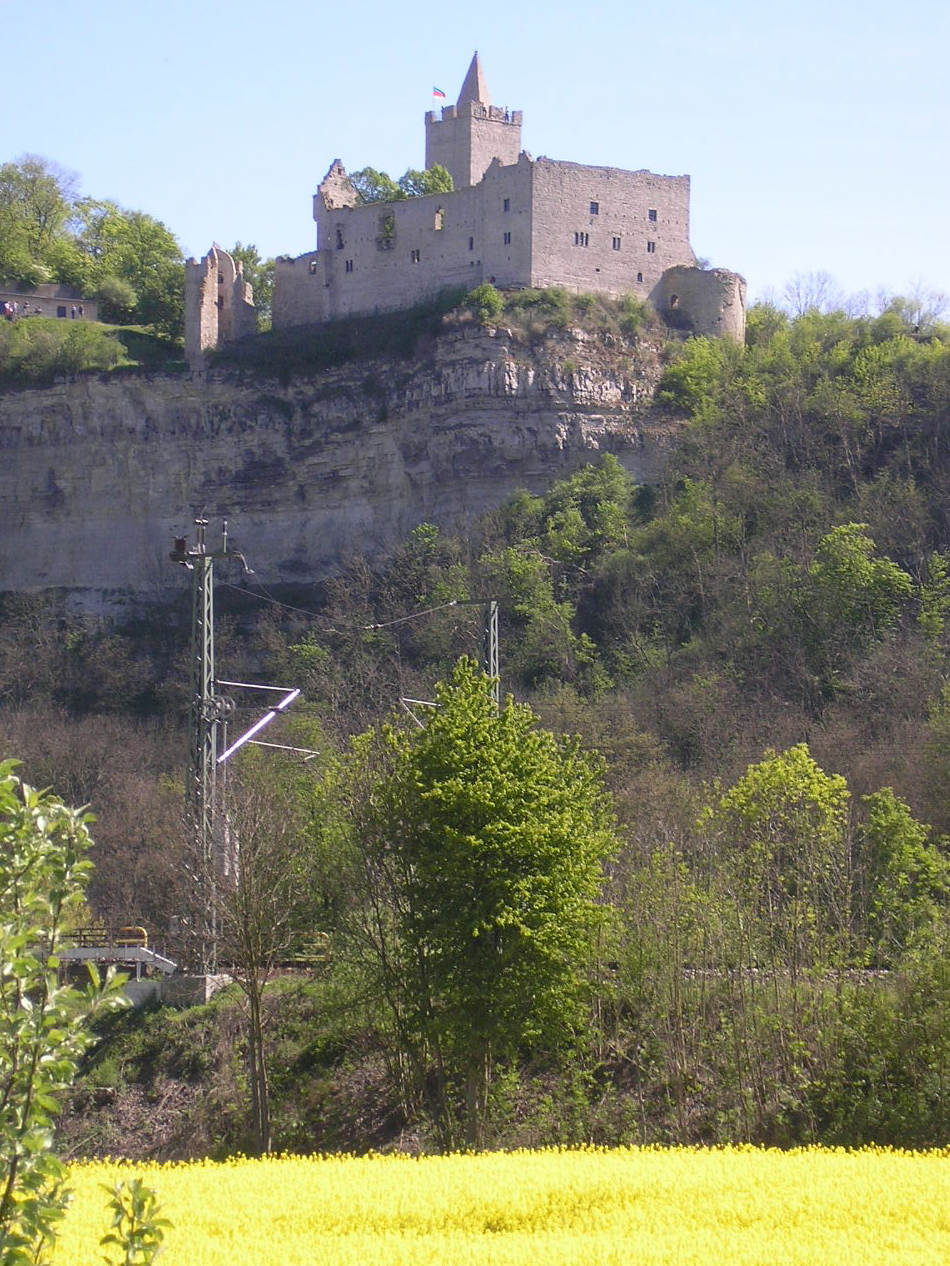
View of the castle from the Saale valley

=== Architecture ===
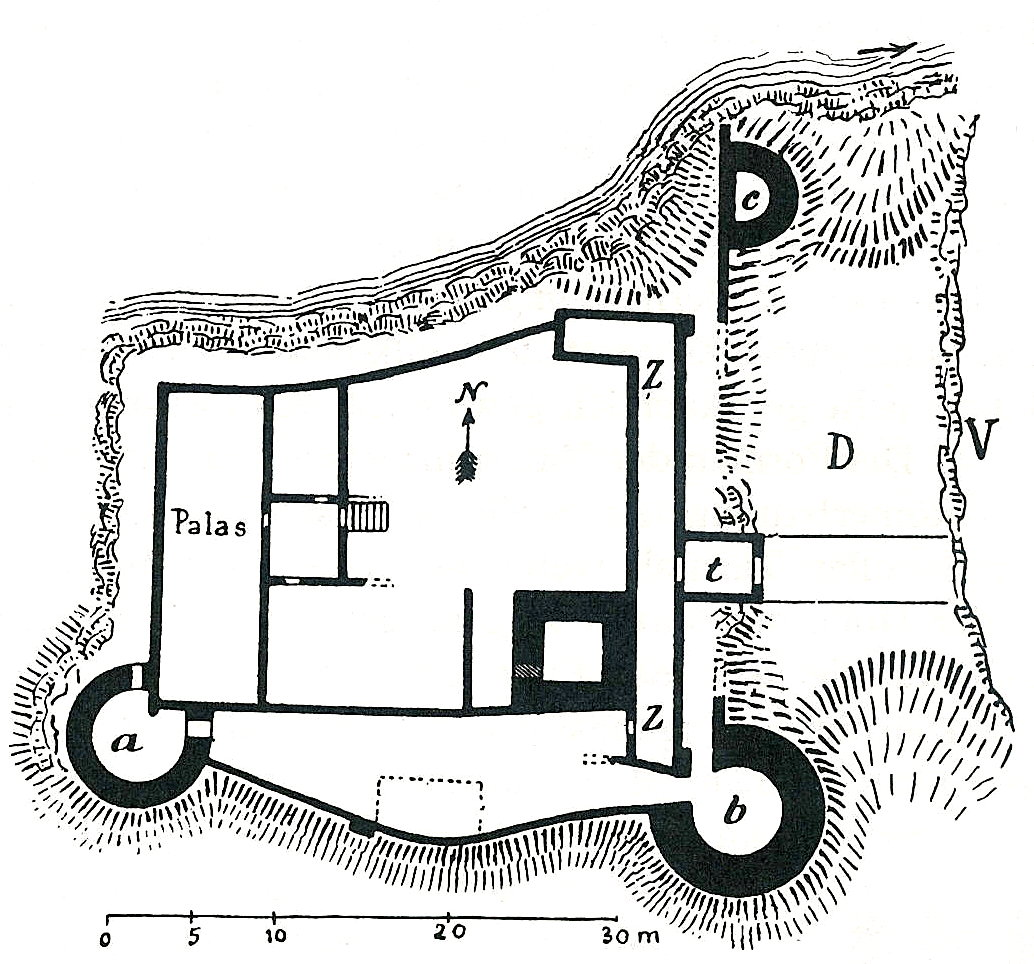
Defensive structures of the Rudelsburg: corner towers (a, b, c), palisades (zz), gate tower (t), ditch (D), remains of the outer keep (V)

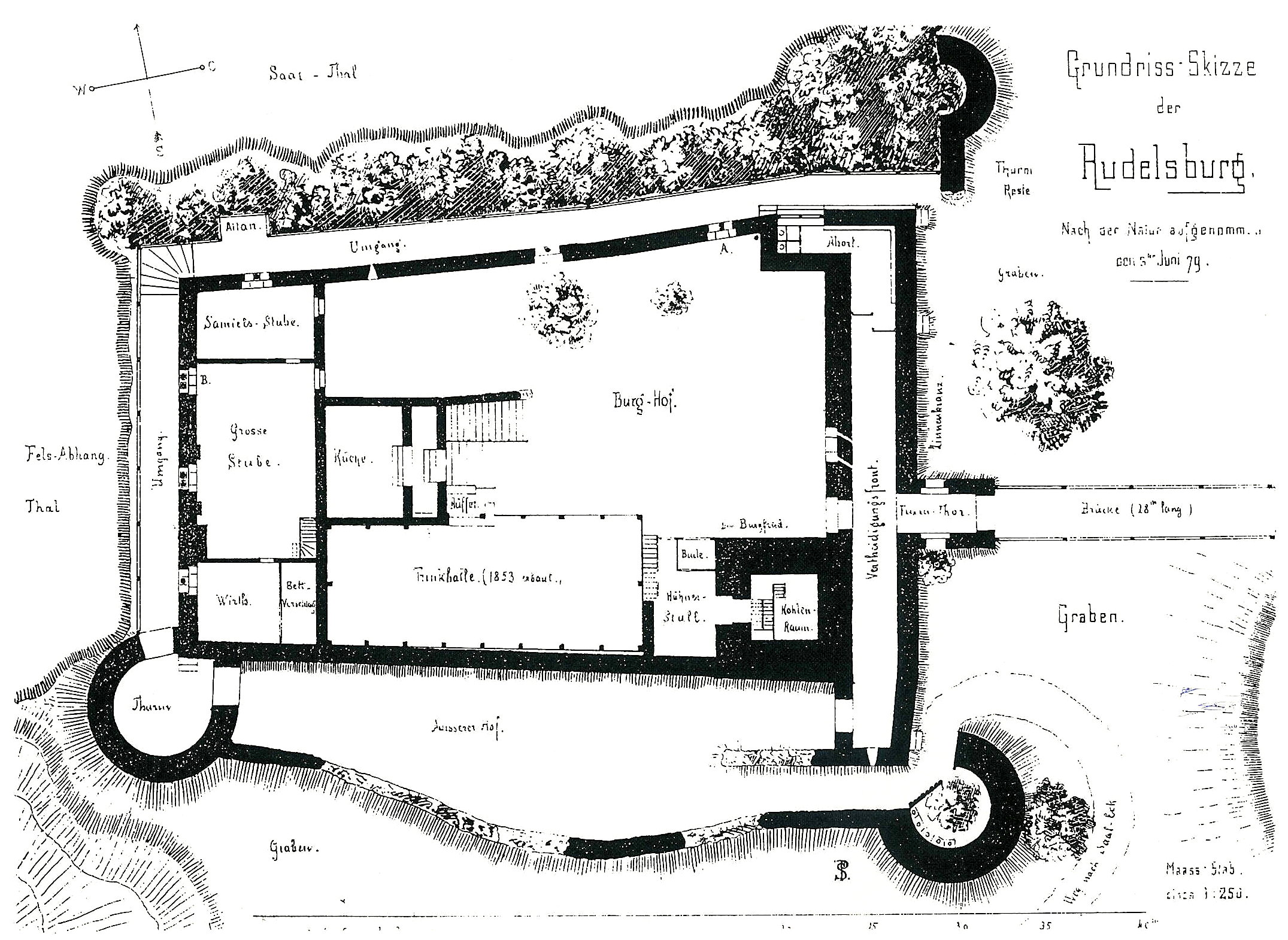
Floor plan of the Rudelsburg from 1879

The Rudelsburg was constructed in the Middle Ages with a central ward divided into several sections and surrounded by an outer ward. The stones of the outer ward were largely reused in the 18th century and it is no longer recognisable; only parts of the wall in the east and south are still there. The outer ward was unusual to the extent that it was built higher up than the central ward was.

The central ward, which was separated from the ward keep by a deep encircling ditch, has a bergfried that is approximately 20 metres (66 ft) high, a transverse rectangular great hall, several living quarters, and is surrounded by a circular wall. The courtyard is very small.

The Romanesque bergfried is almost exactly square (7.6 m × 8.2 m or 24.9 ft × 26.9 ft) and is topped with a pyramid-shaped tower roof made of stone, which gives the castle its characteristic appearance. There is a dungeon in the basement of the donjon.

The outer palisades in the east were constructed in the 13th century, the other palisades and the circular corner towers were constructed in the 15th century. The Rudelsburg palisade, which is located between the central and outer keeps, was obviously envisaged during the construction of the castle and is seen as proof that the idea of palisades did not first arrive in Europe as a result of the Crusades.

Because of its position atop a steep cliff above the Saale, the western side of the castle was the hardest to attack. It is protected only by the circular wall and the great hall is also located on this side.

The northern circular wall was not built on the very edge of the cliff, in contrast to the practice elsewhere in Europe. This was presumably done so as to avoid the wall collapsing if a section of the fragile limestone were to break off. The wall is set back about 1.5 metres (4 ft 11 in), which made the later addition of an advanced corner tower on the north-east side necessary in order to prevent potential enemies from advancing onto this ledge.

The southern side, which is only protected by a small valley, has an additional palisade, which is flanked by two corner towers. The strongest corner tower is on the south-east side. The eastern side looks to the outer keep and is protected by the ditch, a palisade and the donjon.

At some point in time, a windmill was attached to one of the round castle towers. The windmill is shown in many depictions of the castle until the middle of the 19th century. It was destroyed by fire in 1864.

=== Monuments ===
In the course of time, many monuments have been erected at the Rudelsburg. Four important monuments have been put up just by the KSCV on the way from Bad Kösen to the Rudelsburg on the land formerly occupied by the outer keep.

==== Pillar to the Fallen ====
The Kösener Gefallenendenkmal (Pillar to the Fallen) was erected at Pentecost in 1872 in honour of the members of the students’ corps who had fallen in the 1870-1871 Franco-Prussian War. The students put up this monument without the help of the “old men”, whose federation had not yet been founded, and the Pillar was in fact the first monument ever erected by students in Germany. It consisted of a base with stairs, a platform with balustrade, a four-metre tall pedestal and a pillar topped by an imperial eagle with a crown. The monument was destroyed in 1953, under the GDR.

==== Emperor William I Obelisk ====
The Kaiser-Wilhelm-Obelisk (Emperor William I Obelisk) was unveiled on 25 May 1890. It honours the German Emperor, who died in 1888. It too was destroyed under the GDR, but was rebuilt following the reunification.

==== Young Bismarck Monument ====
The Young Bismarck Monument was the first project to be realised by the Verband Alter Corpsstudenten. It was erected in 1895–96 to commemorate the 80th birthday of Otto von Bismarck, himself an “old man” of the Corps Hannovera Göttingen. Of the countless Bismarck monuments erected in Germany, this was the only one that depicted the first Imperial Chancellor as a nonchalantly seated young man with the sash of his fraternity across his chest and a duelling sword in his hand. This portrayal of Bismarck in a casual stance provoked heated discussions, but had been approved by Bismarck himself on 27 April 1895. It is the work of sculptor Norbert Pfretzschner. This monument was destroyed under the GDR by the Free German Youth, but the foundation stone with inscriptions and Bismarck's student hat was saved by members of East German student fraternities and handed over to the KSCV after Reunification. On 29 May 1998, members of the Corps Hannovera Göttingen paid for a memorial to be erected on the site of the old Bismarck monument.

A reproduction of the original monument was unveiled by the KSCV on 1 April 2006 in the presence of the Justice Minister of Saxony-Anhalt, Curt Becker. Andreas Belser from Traunstein was the responsible sculptor and the casting had been carried out by the firm Otto Strehle in Winhöring near Altötting. Many members of the Corps Hannovera who had been involved in the realisation and financing of the reproduction were present at the ceremonial unveiling of the monument. The monument has however already been damaged by souvenir hunters or vandals.

==== Lion Monument ====
The Löwendenkmal (Lion Monument) was erected in 1926 in memory of the 2,360 members of the KSCV who had fallen in World War I. It shows in relief an oversized lion that has been pierced with lances and is dying.

The Lion Monument was created by Hermann Hosaeus (1875–1958), a sculptor from Berlin. After the Reunification, the overgrown monument was restored and new plaques in memory of those who fell in both World Wars were added.

==== Alliance Stone ====
The Alliance Stone was erected at the Rudelsburg in 1997 by members of the Rudelsburger Alliance to commemorate the tenth anniversary of the first official meeting of student fraternities in the GDR. An earlier stone made of concrete had been placed next to the Bismarck Monument in 1987. This “Old Alliance Stone” is still in its original place.

== Gallery ==
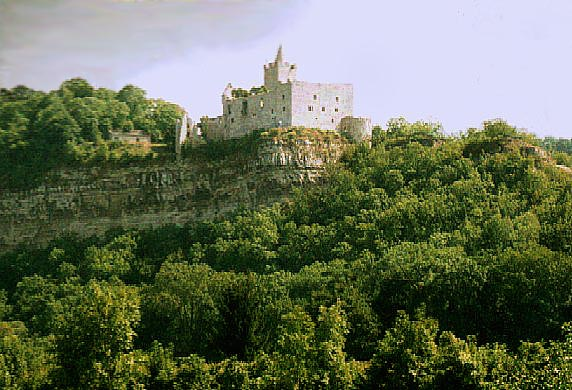
Rudelsburg seen from the Saale valley

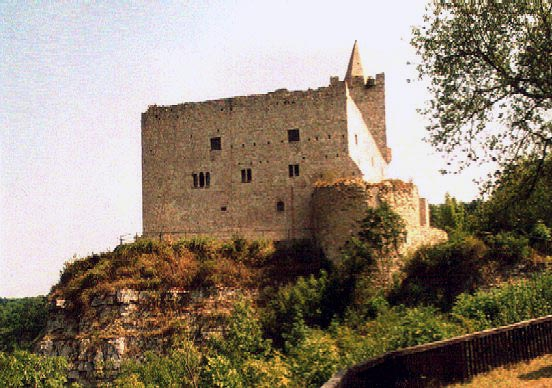
South-western tower

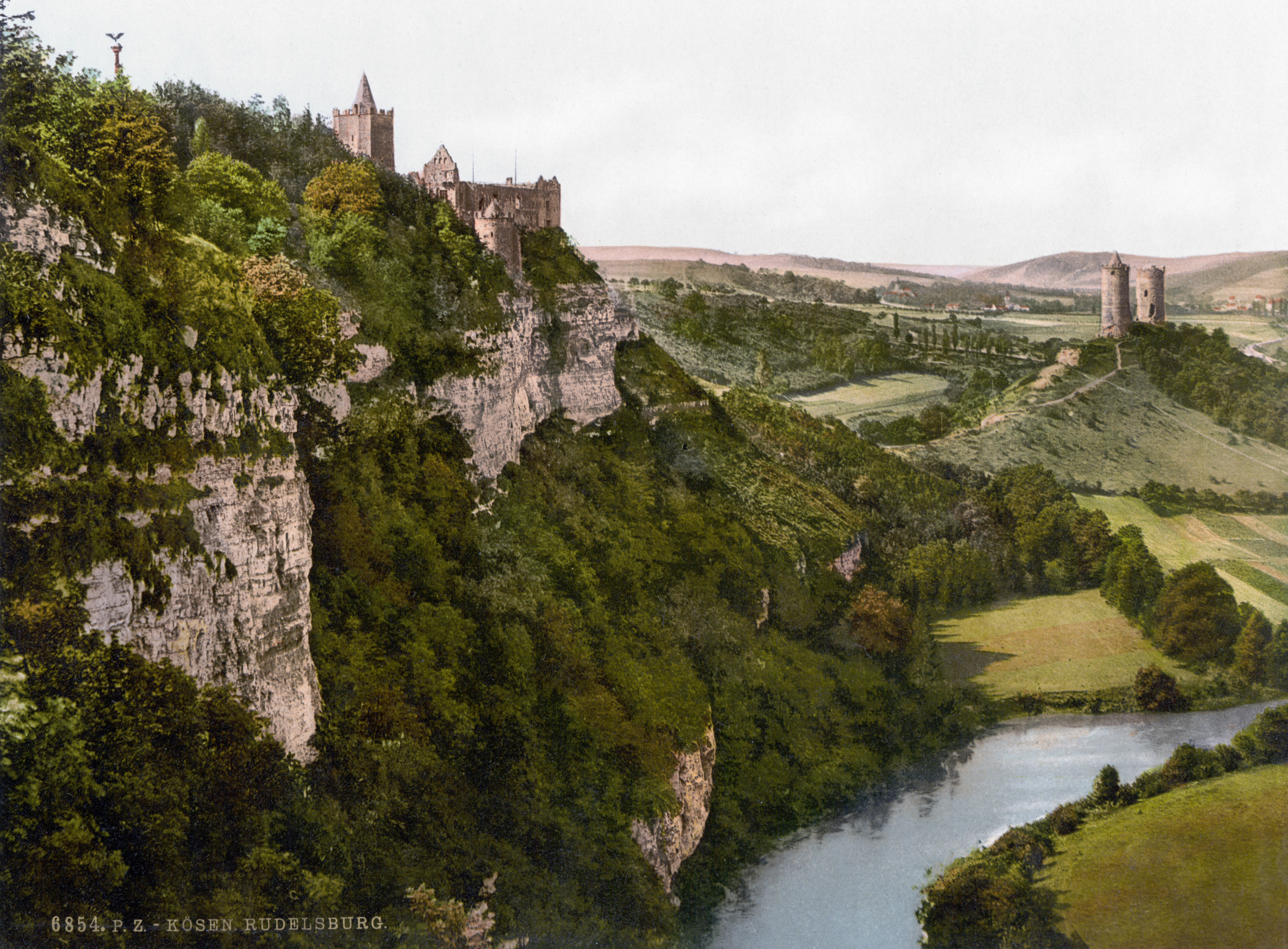
Rudelsburg (left) and Castle Saaleck (around 1900)
