= Saaleck (Naumburg) =

- Ortsteil of Naumburg
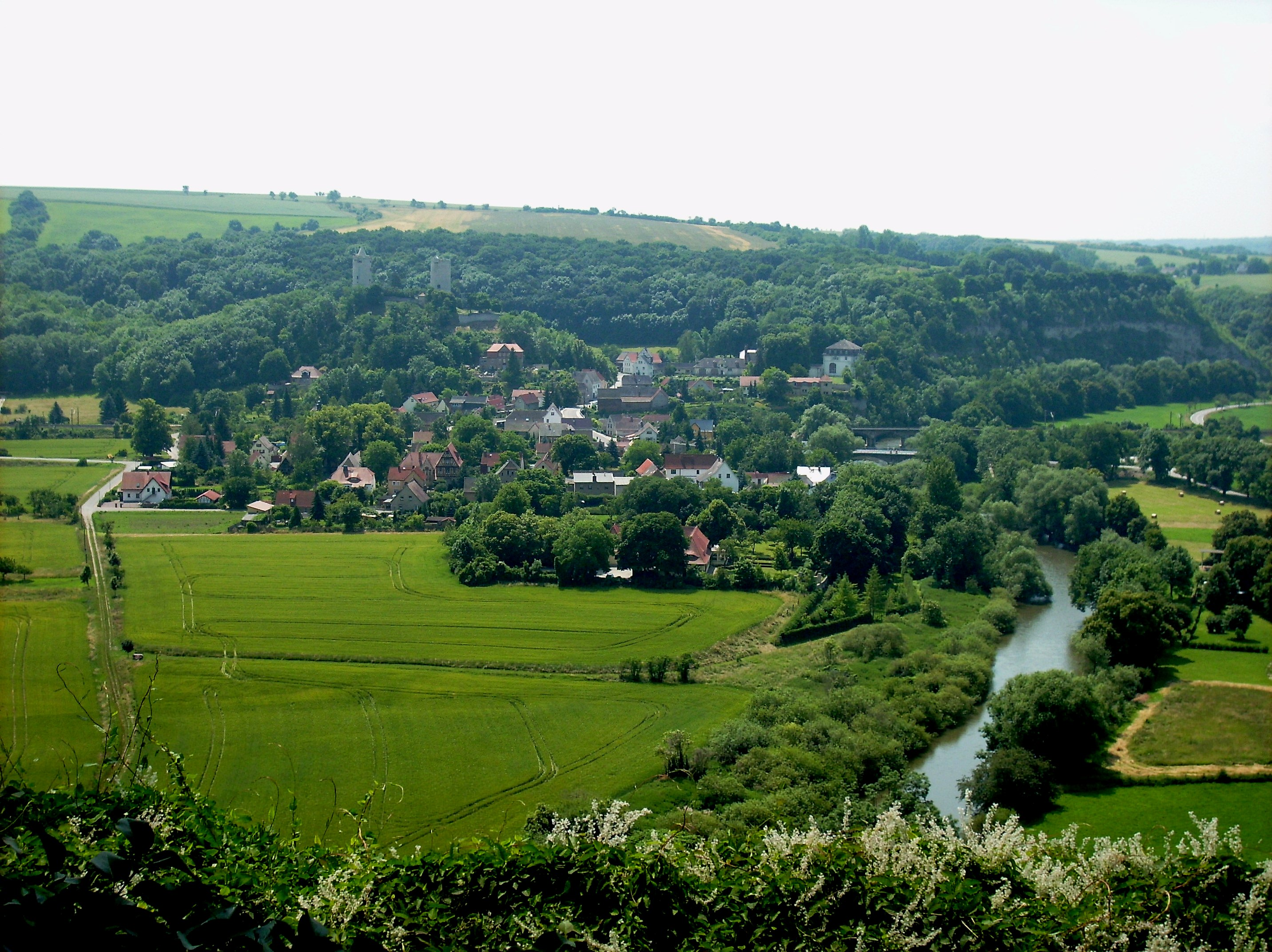
- View of the village and castle of Saaleck
- Interactive map of Saaleck
- Location within Germany Location within Saxony-Anhalt
- Coordinates: 51°06′43″N 11°42′00″E
- Country: Germany
- State: Saxony-Anhalt
- Town: Naumburg
- First mentioned: 1147
- Time zone: UTC+01:00 (CET)
  - Summer (DST): UTC+02:00 (CEST)
- Postal codes: 06628
- Dialling codes: 034463

Saaleck is a village in the former municipality of Bad Kösen, since 2010 part of the town of Naumburg in the district of Burgenlandkreis in the German state of Saxony-Anhalt.

The castles Saaleck and Rudelsburg next to the village have been proposed by Germany for inscription in the List of World Heritage. The World Heritage nomination Naumburg Cathedral and the High Medieval Cultural Landscape of the Rivers Saale and Unstrut is representative for the processes that shaped the continent during the High Middle Ages between 1000 and 1300: Christianization, the so-called “Landesausbau” and the dynamics of cultural exchange and transfer characteristic for this very period.

== Location ==
The village of Saaleck lies about 4 kilometres west (and upstream) of Bad Kösen. The village is managed by the town Naumburg, some 14 kilometres away, and has a population of roughly 300. Above the village is Saaleck Castle and the castle of Rudelsburg. The River Saale flows past the settlement and gives its name to the village because, at this point in the Saale valley, it turns a corner (Ecke). Saaleck is surrounded by rocky slopes about 80 metres high. The castles Saaleck and Rudelsburg are situated in Saxony-Anhalt at the heart of Germany.

== History ==
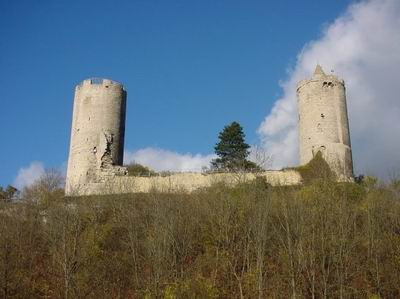
Sandstone, Saale-Unstrut

The castles of Rudelsburg and Saaleck are situated in the immediate vicinity with each other. These castles were built to secure the assets within the territory.

Rudelsburg castle was owned by the bishops of Naumburg while Saaleck castle was founded by the Schenken von Saaleck, a noble family dependent on the Landgraves of Thuringia.

By directly facing each other, the castles of Saaleck and Rudelsburg are symbols of the rivalry among the regional competing powers in the High Middle Ages. Both castles served as strategic outposts above the nearby fords to collect taxes and rights along the Via Regia and the main trade routes that added to the wealth of the region in the 12th century.

== Rudelsburg ==
Rudelsburg Castle was constructed around 1170 during the term of Bishop Udo II of Naumburg (1161 – 1186). In 1238, Bishop Engelhard (1206 – 1242) gave the castle (castrum et oppidum) to Margrave Henry of Meissen (1221 – 1288) as a fief. It marked the border of the realm of the Naumburg bishops. Rudelsburg Castle is a two-part complex comprising a small inner bailey in the west and a large-area outer bailey stretching over the entire plateau. Directly behind the gate there is a square-shaped Romanesque castle keep. This type of castle keep is rarely to be found. The square-shaped castle keep from the 12th century with battlements measures 20 metres and is the symbol of the castle, which can be seen from afar.

== Saaleck ==
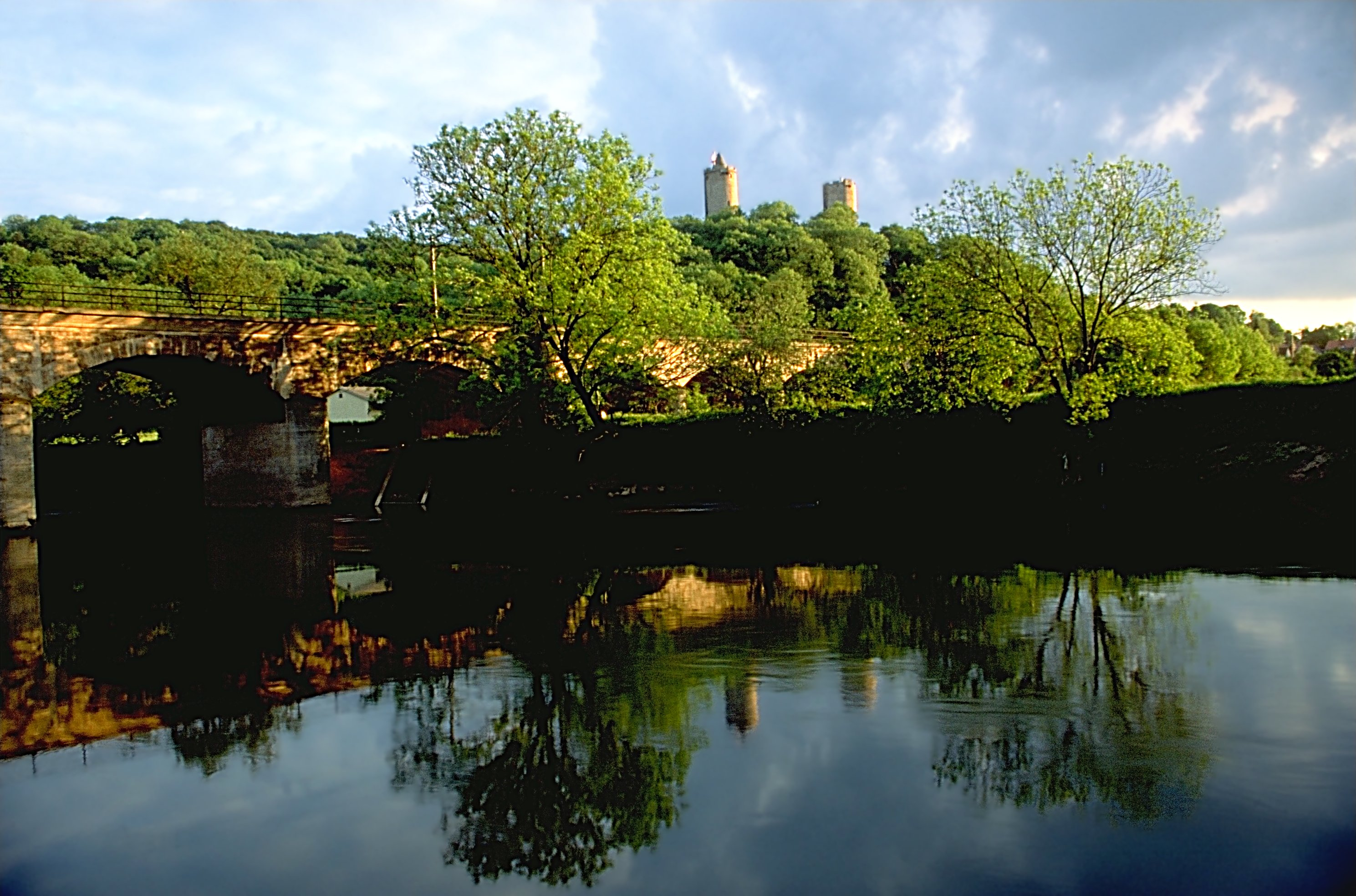
Saaleck

The ruins of Saaleck Castle rest on a low tongue of a range of hills about 65 metres above the Saale River, which is flowing around three of its sides. The surviving structures suggest that the castle was erected in the late 12th and early 13th century.

The small, two-part castle complex was limited in size also by the natural characteristics of the terrain. It used to be composed of an upper castle (inner bailey) and a lower castle (outer bailey). Local shell limestone was used as building material.

== Today ==
The silhouette of the castles Saaleck and Rudelsburg in very short distance to another has become one of the most prominent emblems of the reception of the Middle Ages since the period of Romanticism.

== See also ==
- World Heritage Convention
- World Heritage Site
- World Heritage Committee
- High Middle Ages
- Cultural Landscape
