= Saaleck Castle =

Castle

- Burg Saaleck
- Saaleck
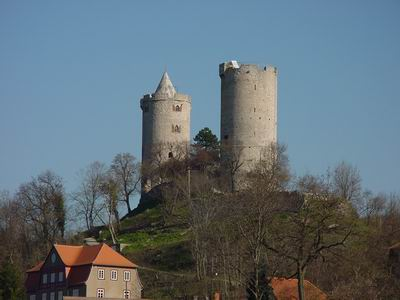
- Saaleck Castle

Site information
- Type: hill castle
- Code: DE-ST
- Condition: two towers, enceinte

Location
- Location within Saxony-Anhalt Location within Germany
- Coordinates: 51°6′35″N 11°42′5″E
- Height: 172 m above sea level (NN)

Site history
- Built: before 1200

Garrison information
- Occupants: free knights, counts, Amtmänner

Saaleck Castle (German: Burg Saaleck) is a hill castle near Bad Kösen, now a part of Naumburg, Saxony-Anhalt, Germany.

It was constructed in the 12th century. For details, see among Saaleck (Naumburg) Saaleck town history.

In 1922, two of the men who had killed Walther Rathenau, the foreign minister of Germany, hid at Saaleck Castle but were tracked down by the police. The Nazi regime later put up a memorial plaque at the castle and turned their grave in Saaleck cemetery into a heroes' shrine.

The castle is now mostly ruined, but its two towers feature small exhibits and it is a popular tourist attraction. Saaleck Castle is a stop on the designated tourist route Straße der Romanik ("Romanesque Road").

== Geography ==
Saaleck Castle is located in the village of Saaleck in the district of Burgenlandkreis in the German state of Saxony-Anhalt. It overlooks the Saale river and is only a few hundred metres from another castle, the Rudelsburg. Since 2010, Bad Kösen and with it Saaleck Castle has been part of the municipality of Naumburg.

== History ==
In 1922, two of the assassins of German foreign minister Walther Rathenau were spotted at the castle, whose owner was himself a secret member of the Organisation Consul. On 17 July they were confronted by two police detectives. While waiting for reinforcements during the stand-off one of the detectives fired at a window, unknowingly killing Erwin Kern with a bullet in the head. Hermann Willibald Fischer then took his own life. The Nazis erected a memorial plate to them at the castle in July 1933.

Under East Germany's communist regime, the complex served as a residential care home for the elderly. From 1995 until 2019, it was not used.

The Marzona Foundation acquired the property in 2018 and the German government has approved a grant of 7 million euros towards the site's renovation. The Design Academy Saaleck plans to offer six-month stipends to work on individual and joint projects with a special focus on climate, sustainability and new technologies to 16 emerging designers, craftspeople or architects from around the world each year.

== Description ==
The castle lies on a roof-shaped, west-facing muschelkalk ridge immediately south of the village of Saaleck, at a height of about 172 metres (564 ft) above sea level and is just under 23 metres (75 ft) high. The characteristic picture of the castle is dominated by its two bergfrieds, which have wall thicknesses of about 2 metres and are visible from a long way off. In the masonry of the west tower is a medieval garderobe and a stove that indicate where the residential level was. The centre of the castle was once surrounded by inner and outer defensive walls. By the inner wall are the remains of several domestic buildings. On the two narrow sides of the surrounding terrace were moats with ramparts in front of it. On the east side of the hill spur facing Rudelsburg there are more neck ditches, again guarded by ramparts.

Comparable castles with two round bergfrieds are Münzenberg, Hohandlau, Botenlaube and Thurant.

== Gallery ==
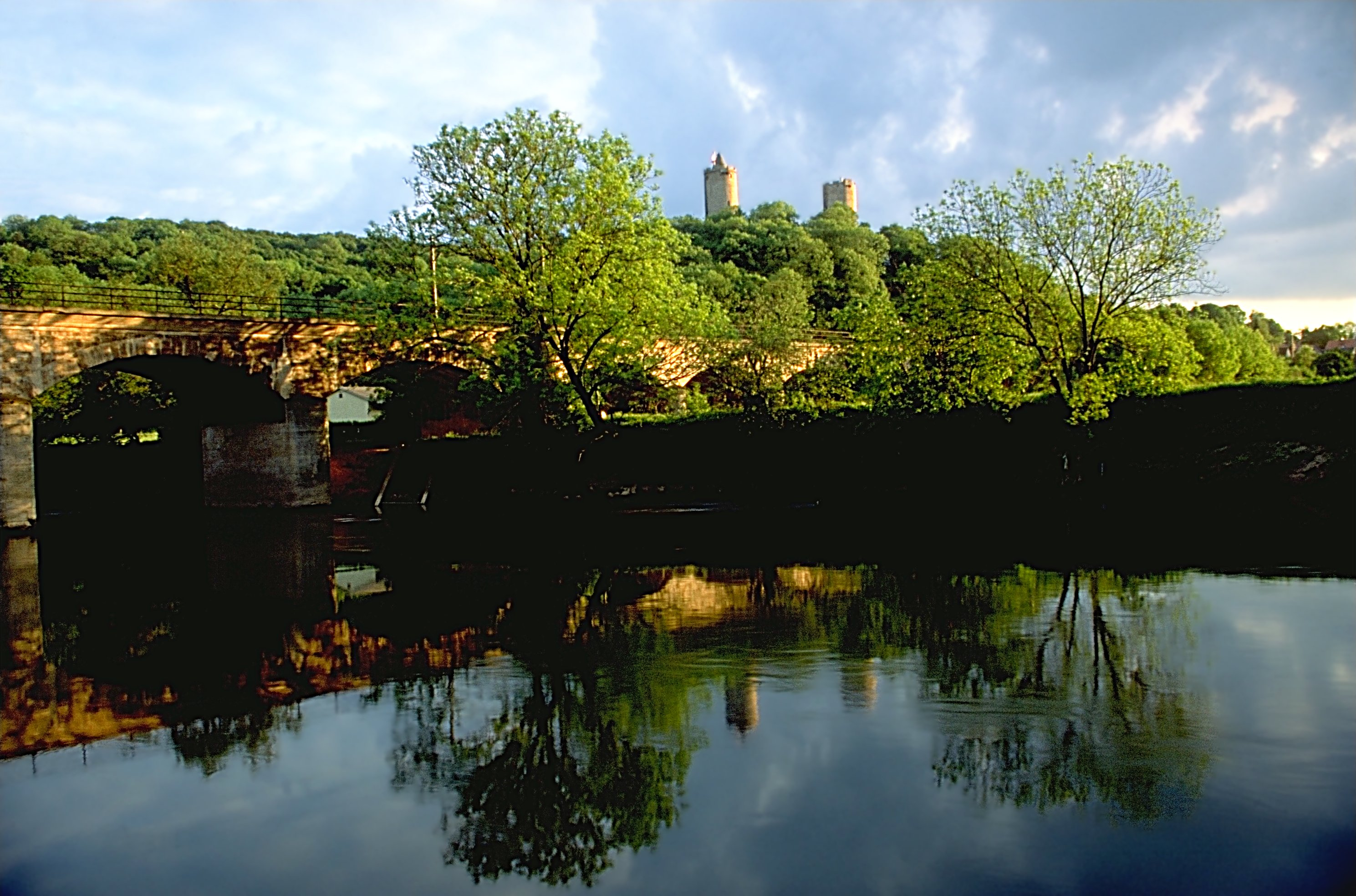
Saaleck Castle

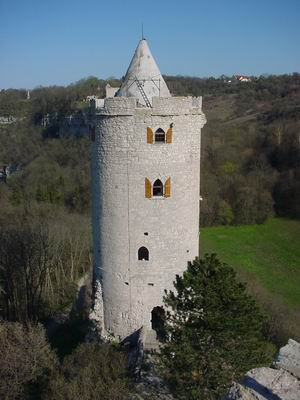
Saaleck Castle

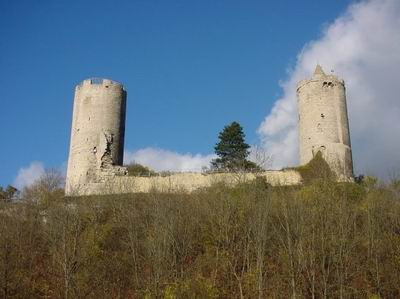
Saaleck Castle

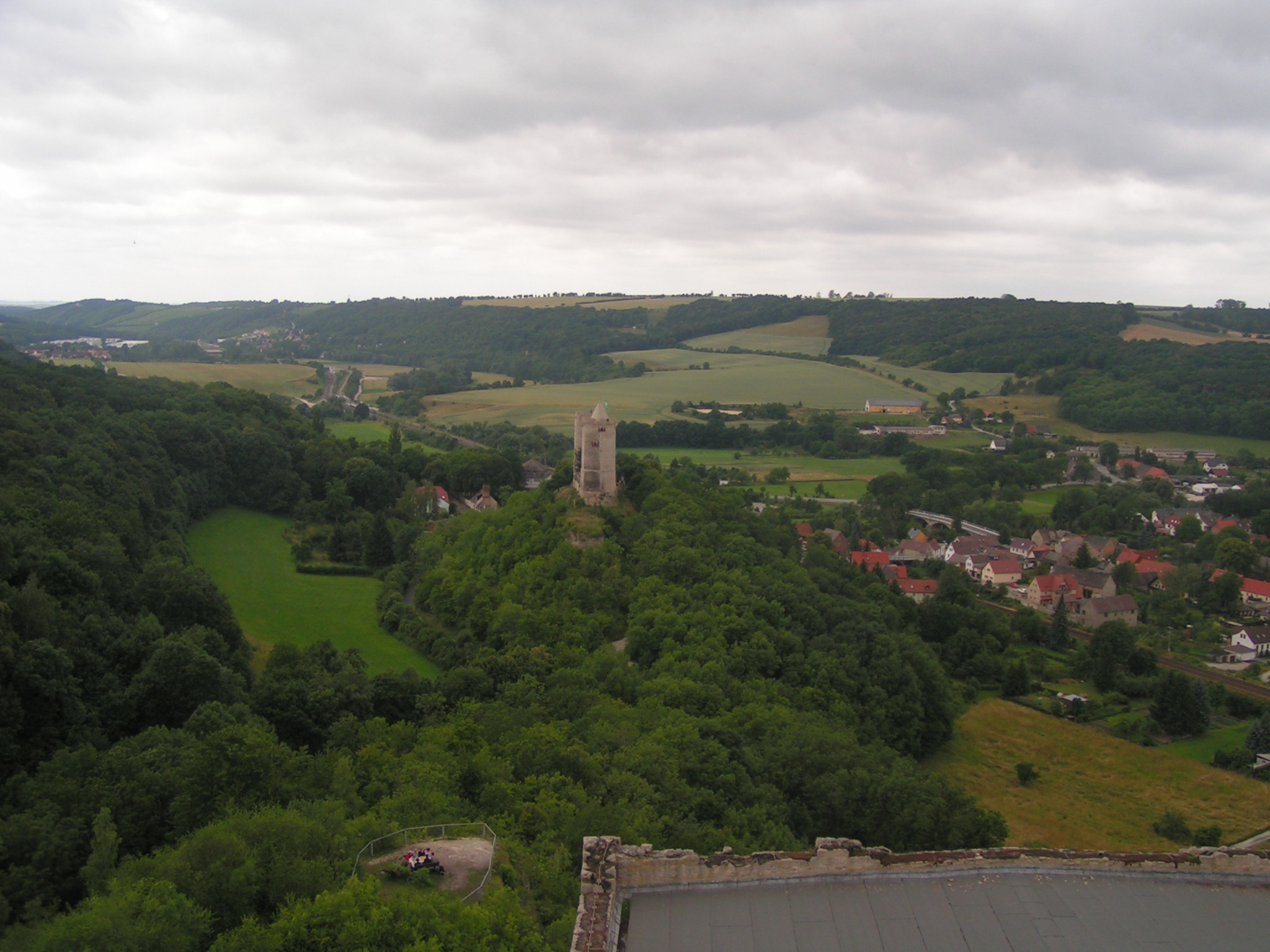
View of the castle from Rudelsburg
