= Bad Kösen =

- Stadtteil of Naumburg
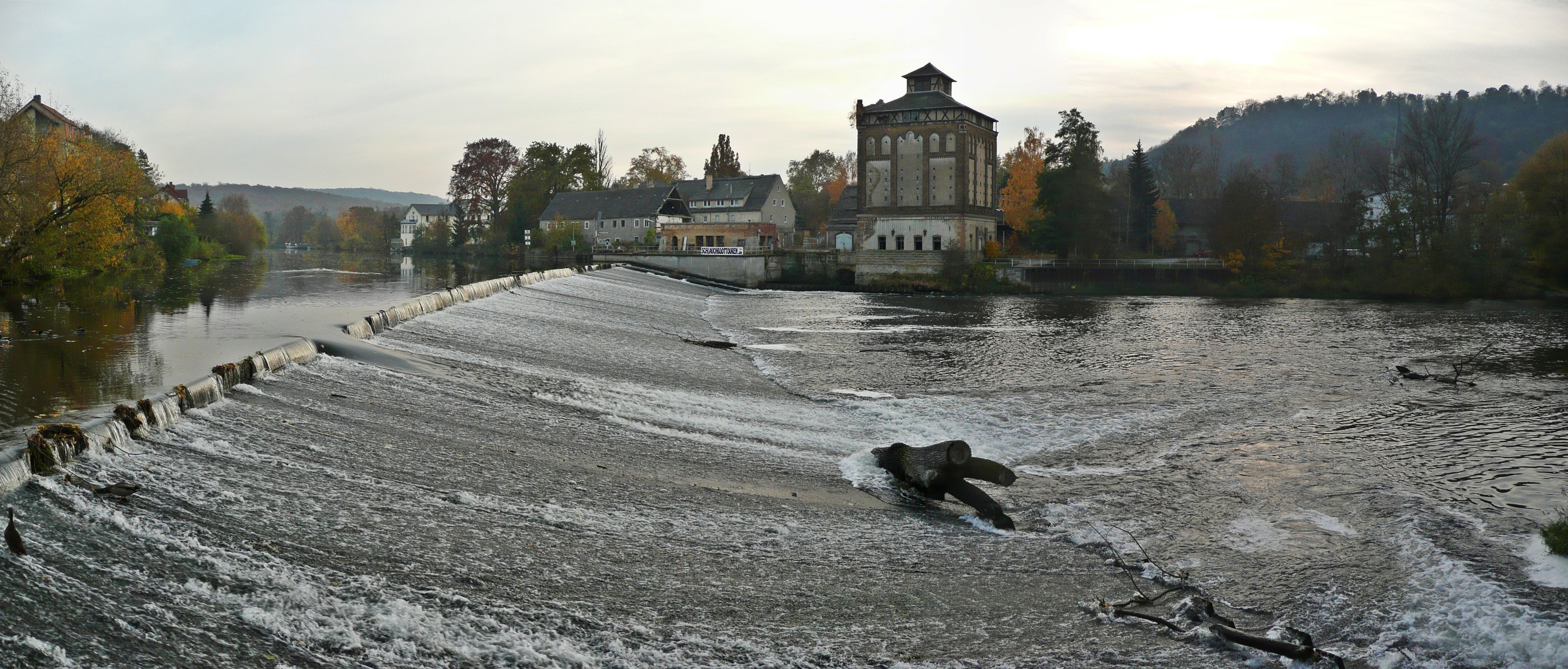
- Weir of the Saale river and old water mill

- Coat of arms
- Interactive map of Bad Kösen
- Location within Germany Location within Saxony-Anhalt
- Coordinates: 51°8′7″N 11°43′14″E
- Country: Germany
- State: Saxony-Anhalt
- District: Burgenlandkreis
- Town: Naumburg

Area
  - Total: 35.72 km^{2} (13.79 sq mi)
- Elevation: 115 m (377 ft)

Population (2006-12-31)
  - Total: 5,360
  - Density: 150/km^{2} (389/sq mi)
- Time zone: UTC+01:00 (CET)
  - Summer (DST): UTC+02:00 (CEST)
- Postal codes: 06628
- Dialling codes: 034463
- Vehicle registration: BLK
- Website: Official website

Bad Kösen (German: [baːt ˈkøːzn̩]) is a spa town on the Saale river in the small wine-growing region of Saale-Unstrut, Germany. It is a former municipality in the Burgenlandkreis district, in Saxony-Anhalt. Bad Kösen has a population of around 5,300. Since 1 January 2010, it has been a Stadtteil (part) of the town of Naumburg.

== Overview ==
The name of the town was Kösen until 1935.
Bad Kösen, and the nearby Rudelsburg castle with its memorials to the German Student Corps, is the location of the annual convention of the Kösener Senioren-Convents-Verband. In sight of the Rudelsburg is the ruin of the nearby Saaleck Castle.

Bad Kösen was the seat of the former Verwaltungsgemeinschaft ("municipal association") Bad Kösen.

Pforta is an Ortsteil of Bad Kösen.

== Gallery ==
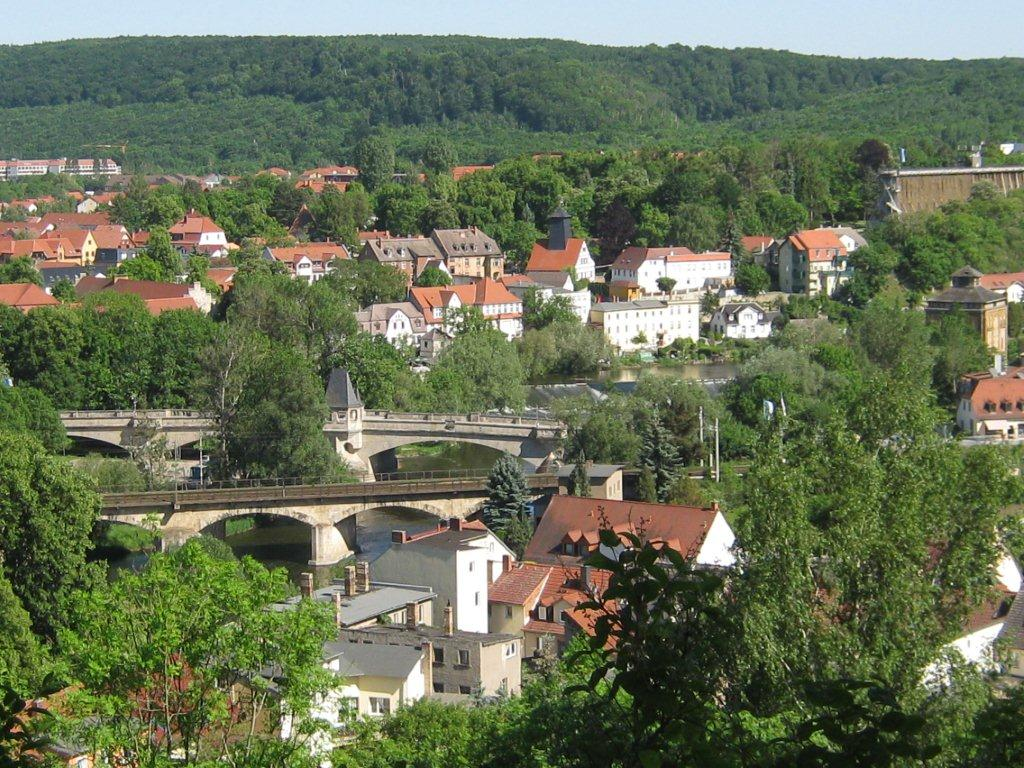

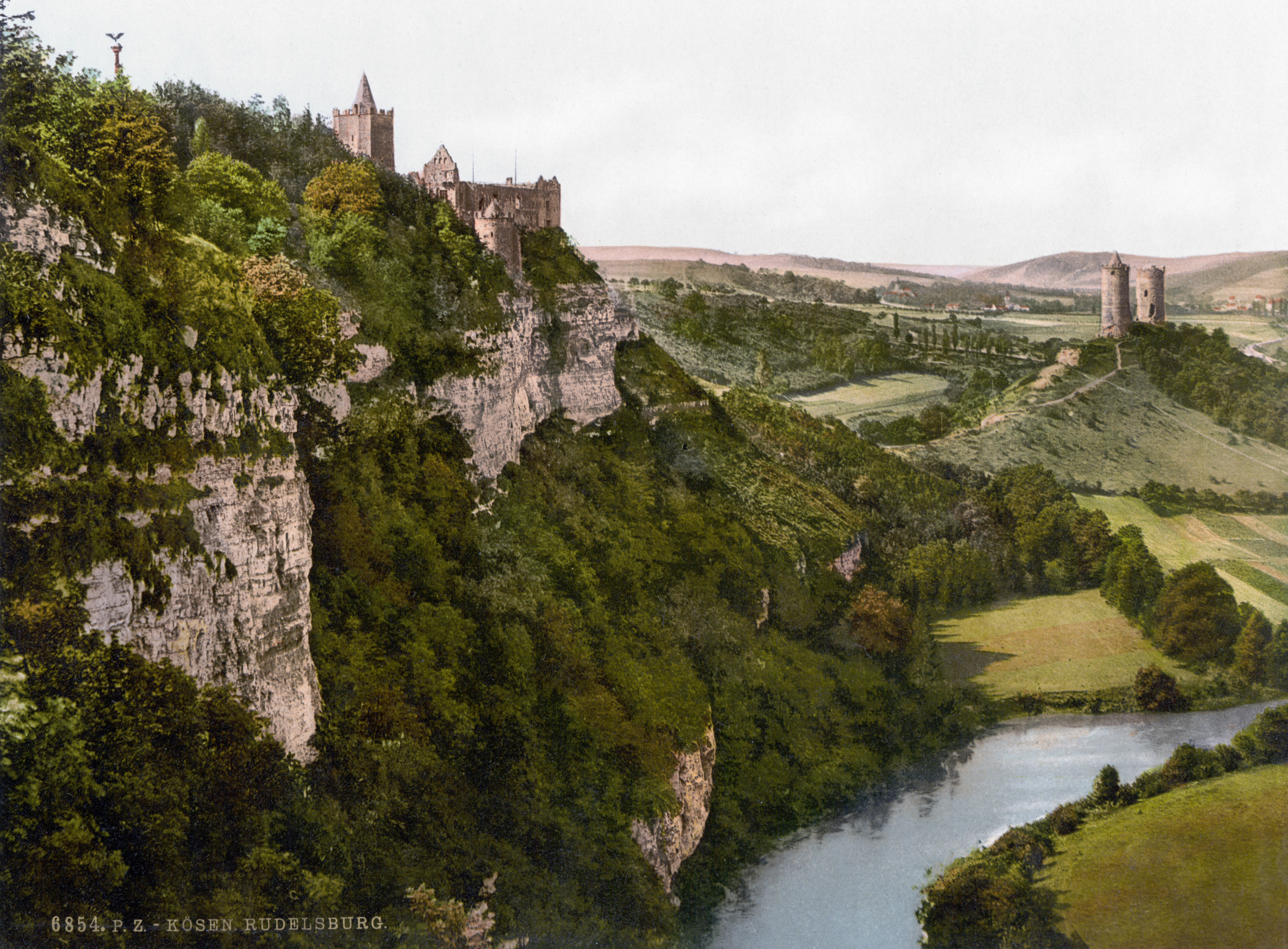
Rudelsburg, c.1890

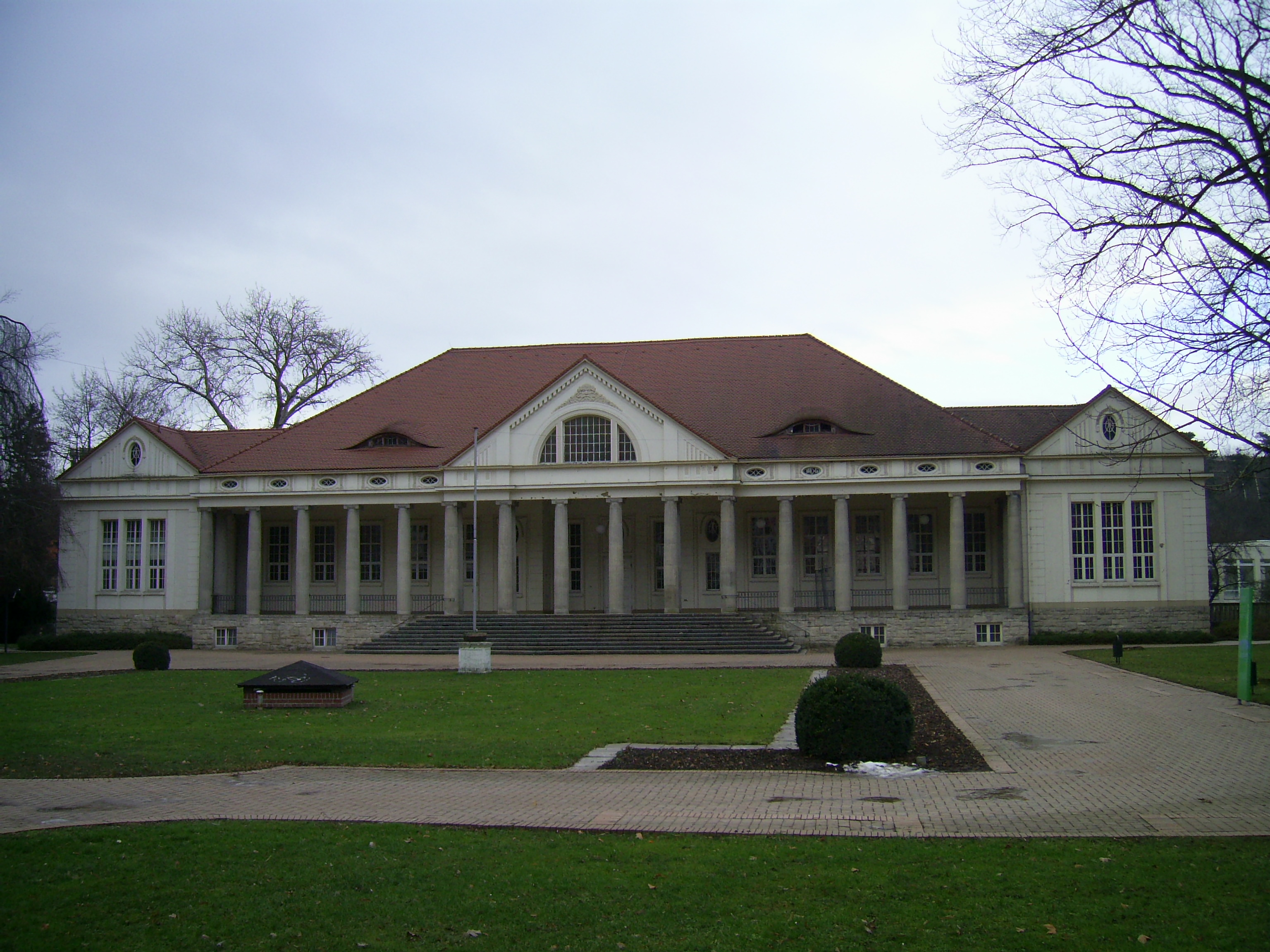

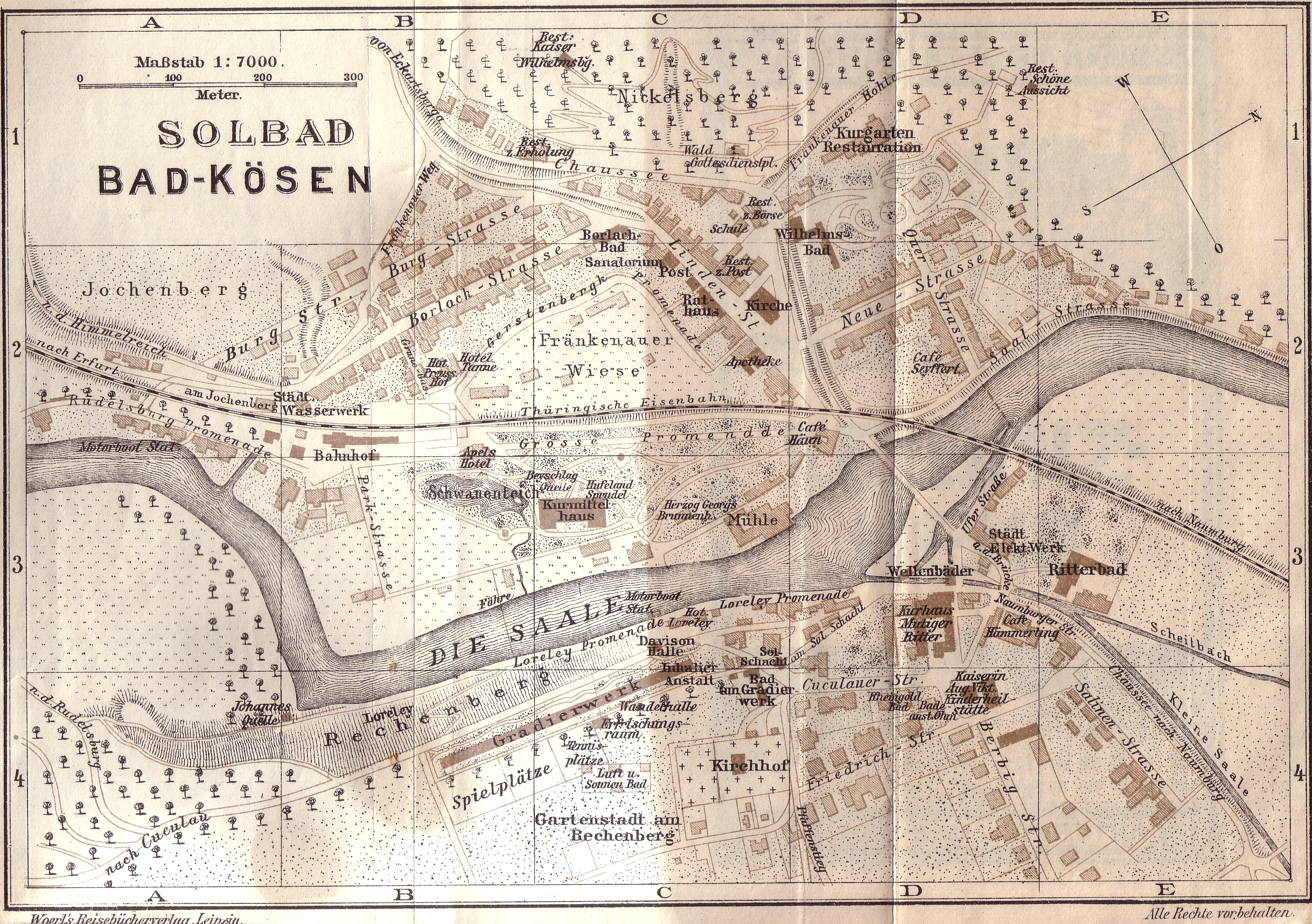
Map from 1914

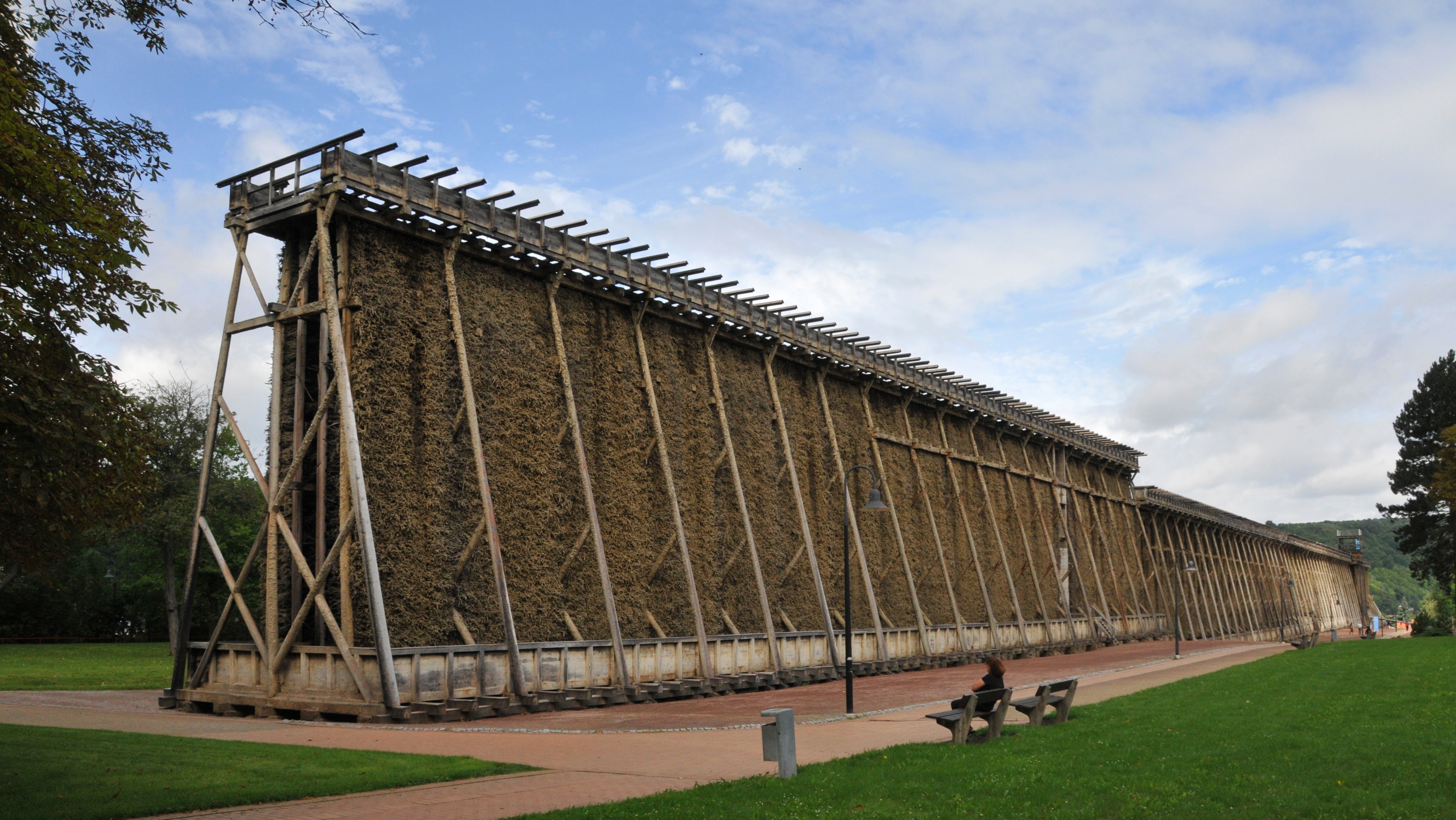

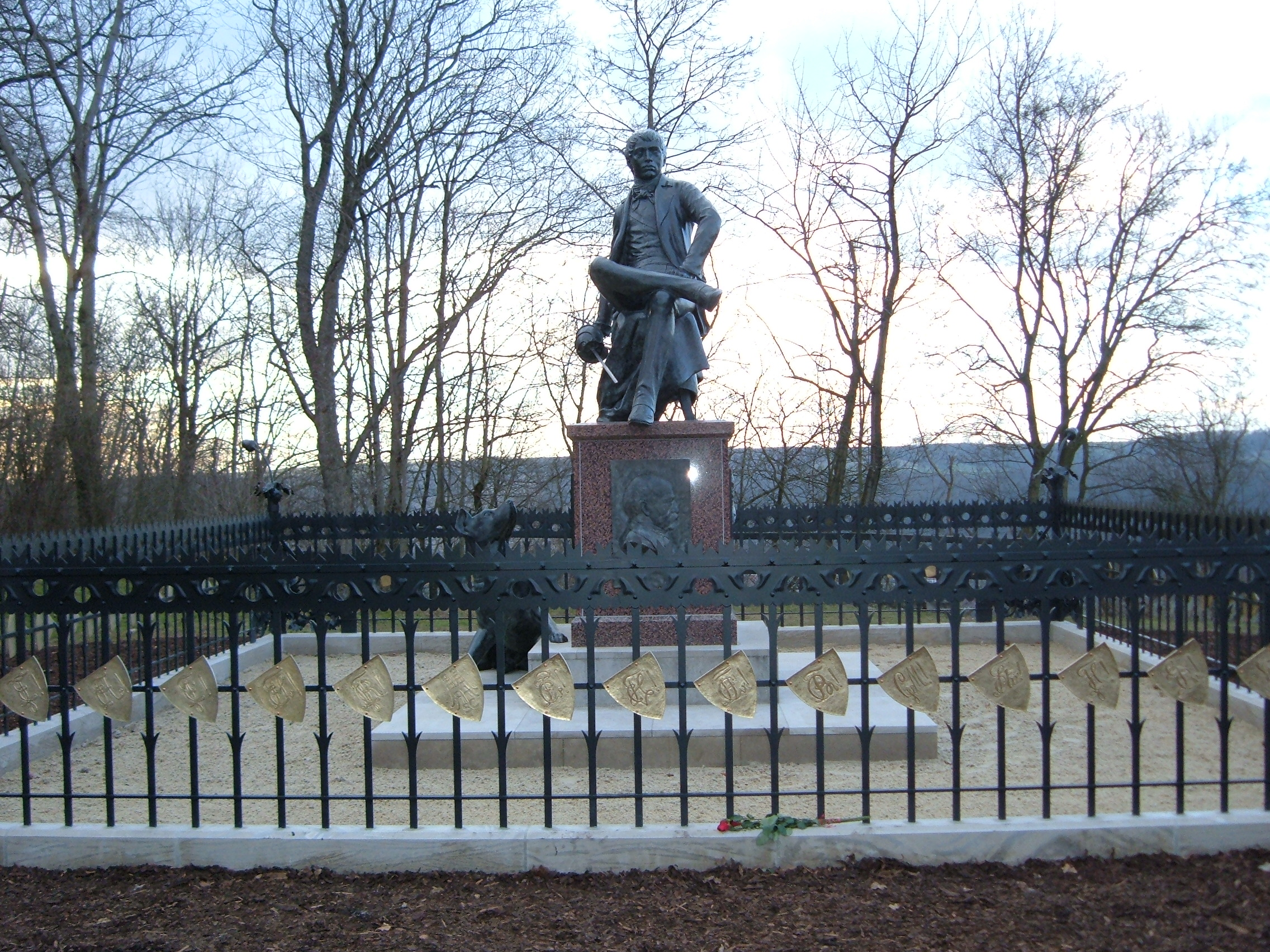
Bismarck Memorial

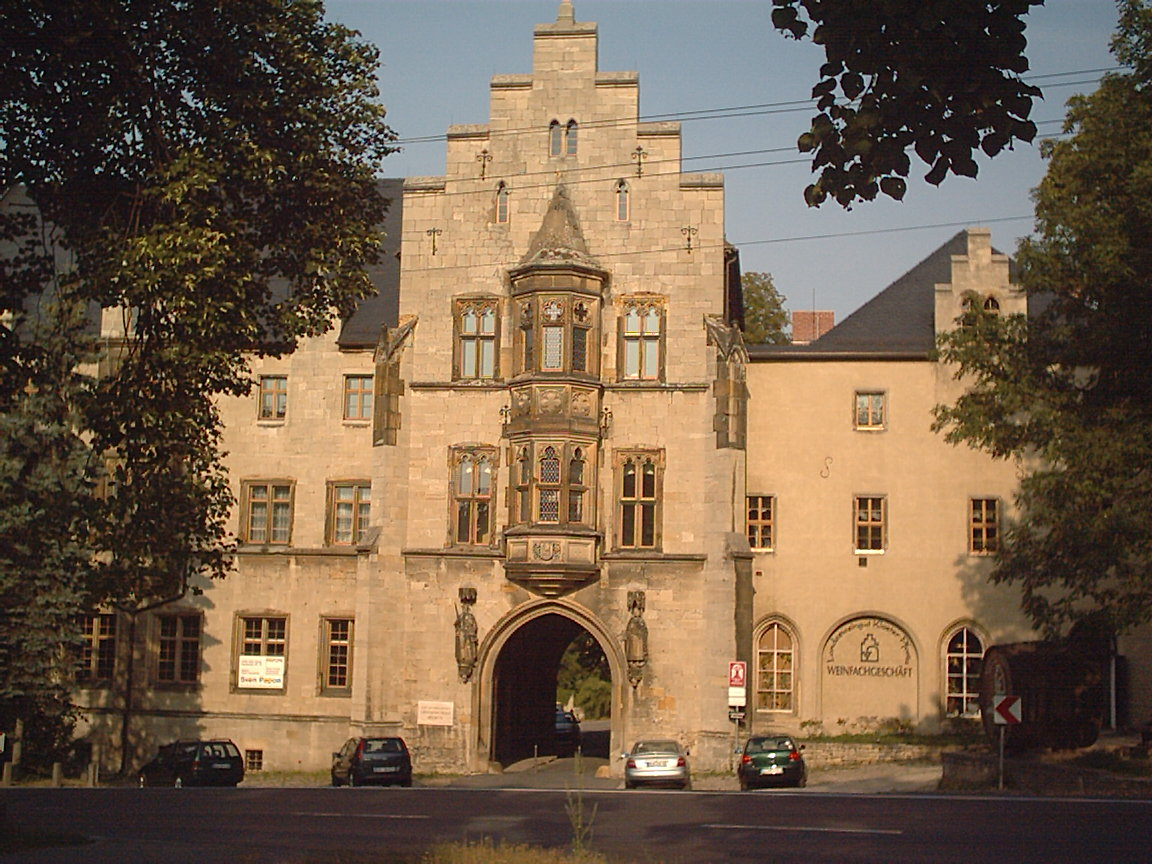
Gate house of Pforta

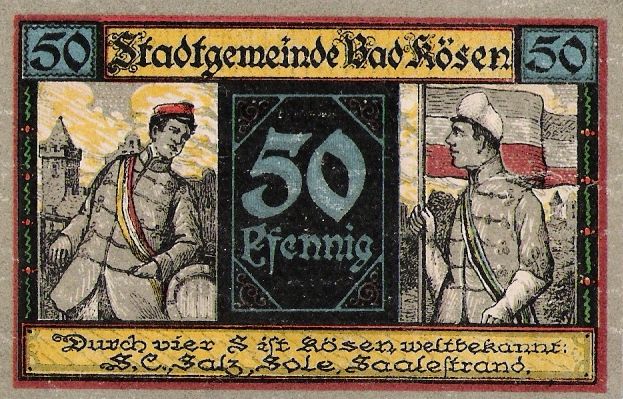

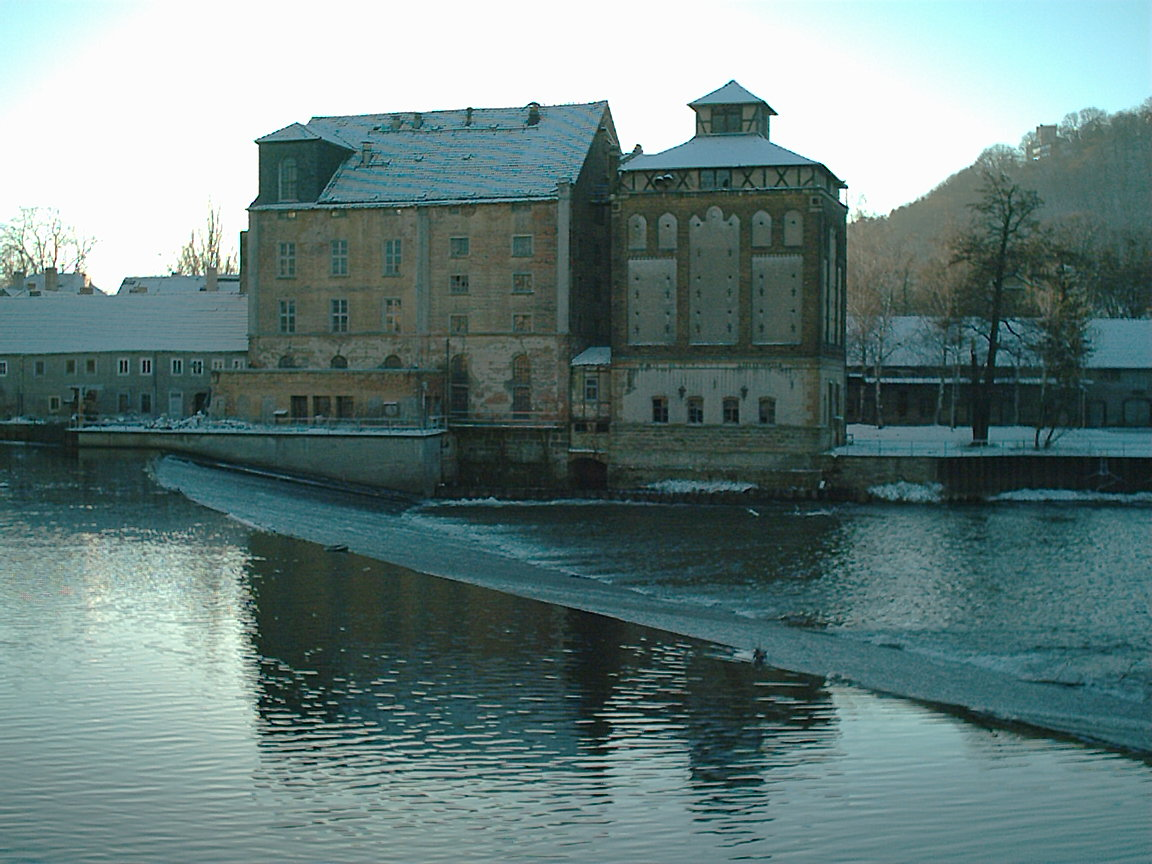
Old water mill

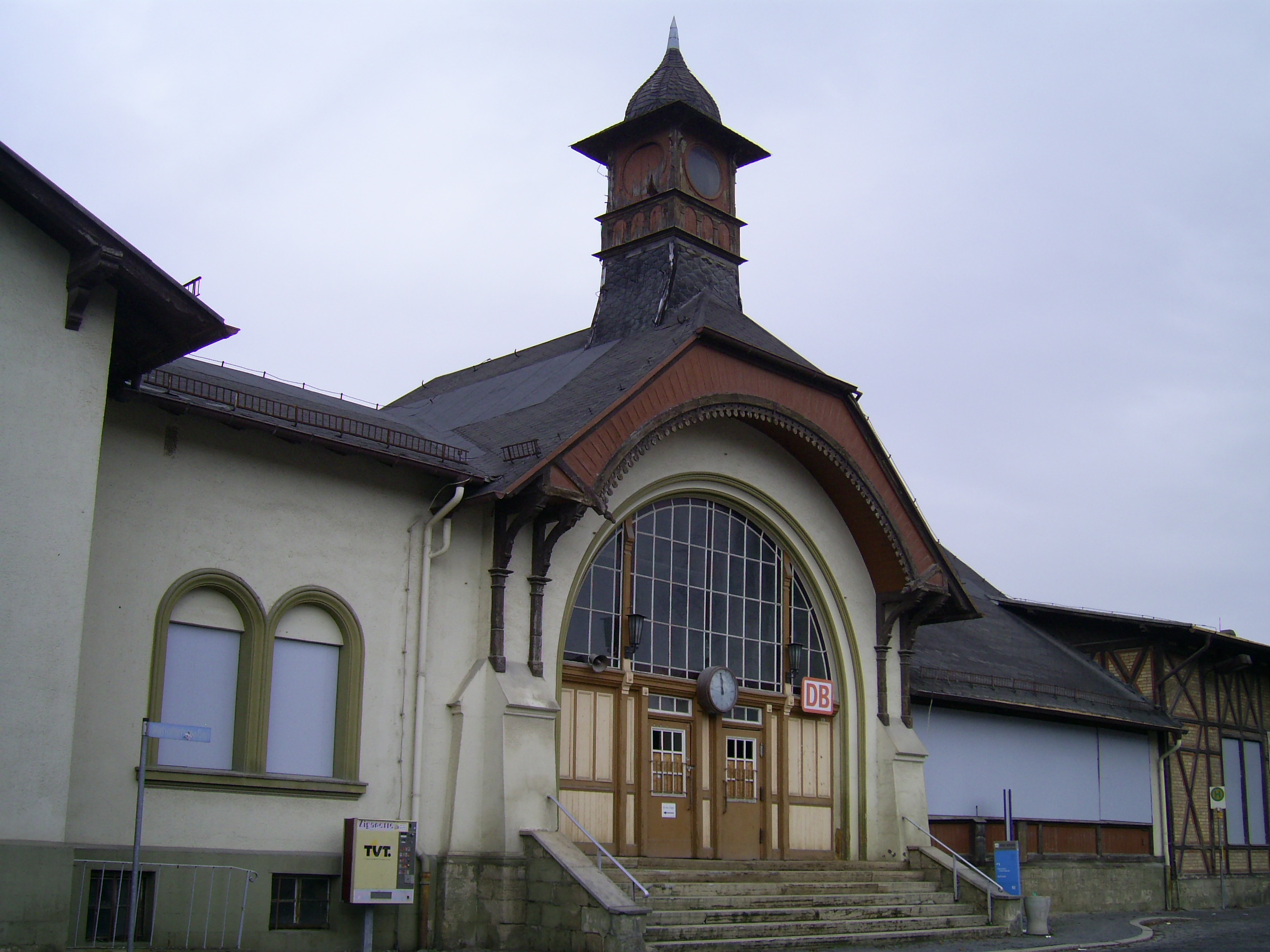
Train station

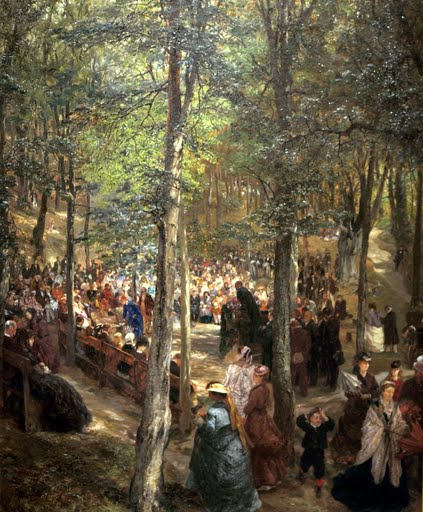
