= Hermann Allmers =

German poet (1821–1902)

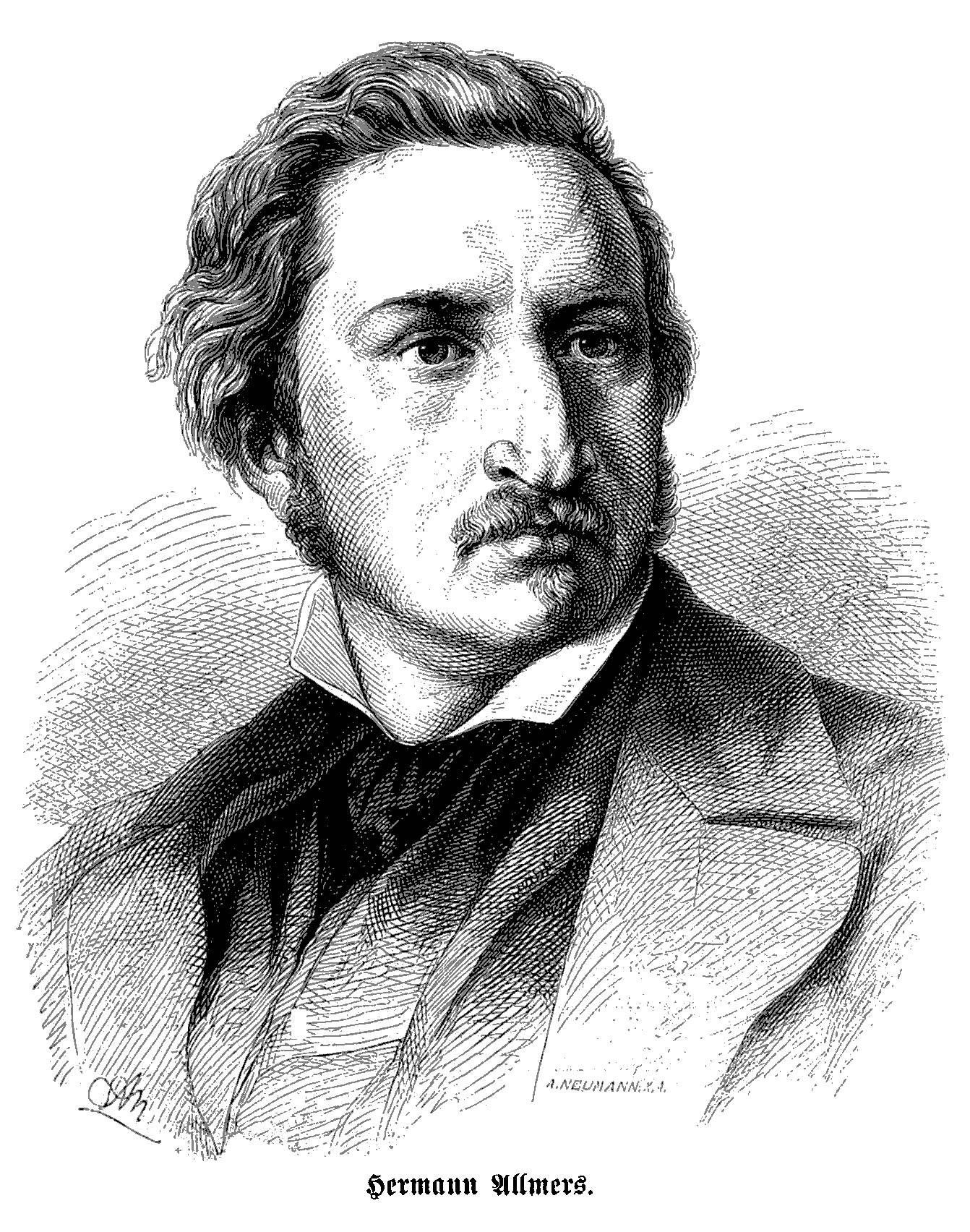
Hermann Allmers; from Die Gartenlaube (1872)

Hermann Allmers (11 February 1821, Rechtenfleth – 9 March 1902) was a German poet.

He was an only child, and was privately tutored. He began his career in public education, but took over the family farm after the death of his father in 1849.

Through travel, he met a number of influential people who inspired him to take writing seriously, leading to his publication of his Marschenbuch in 1858.

He wrote the poem Feldeinsamkeit which was then made into a song by Johannes Brahms.

Allmers was born in Rechtenfleth, just north of Sandstedt, and died in Rechtenfleth also.
