= Bad Kösen (Verwaltungsgemeinschaft) =

Coordinates: 51.135°N 11.721°E

Bad Kösen was a Verwaltungsgemeinschaft ("collective municipality") in the Burgenlandkreis (district), in Saxony-Anhalt, Germany. The seat of the Verwaltungsgemeinschaft was in Bad Kösen. It was disbanded in January 2008.

The Verwaltungsgemeinschaft Bad Kösen consisted of the following municipalities:

1. Abtlöbnitz
2. Bad Kösen
3. Crölpa-Löbschütz
4. Janisroda
5. Leislau
6. Prießnitz
