= Christian Gottlob Leberecht Großmann =

German theologian

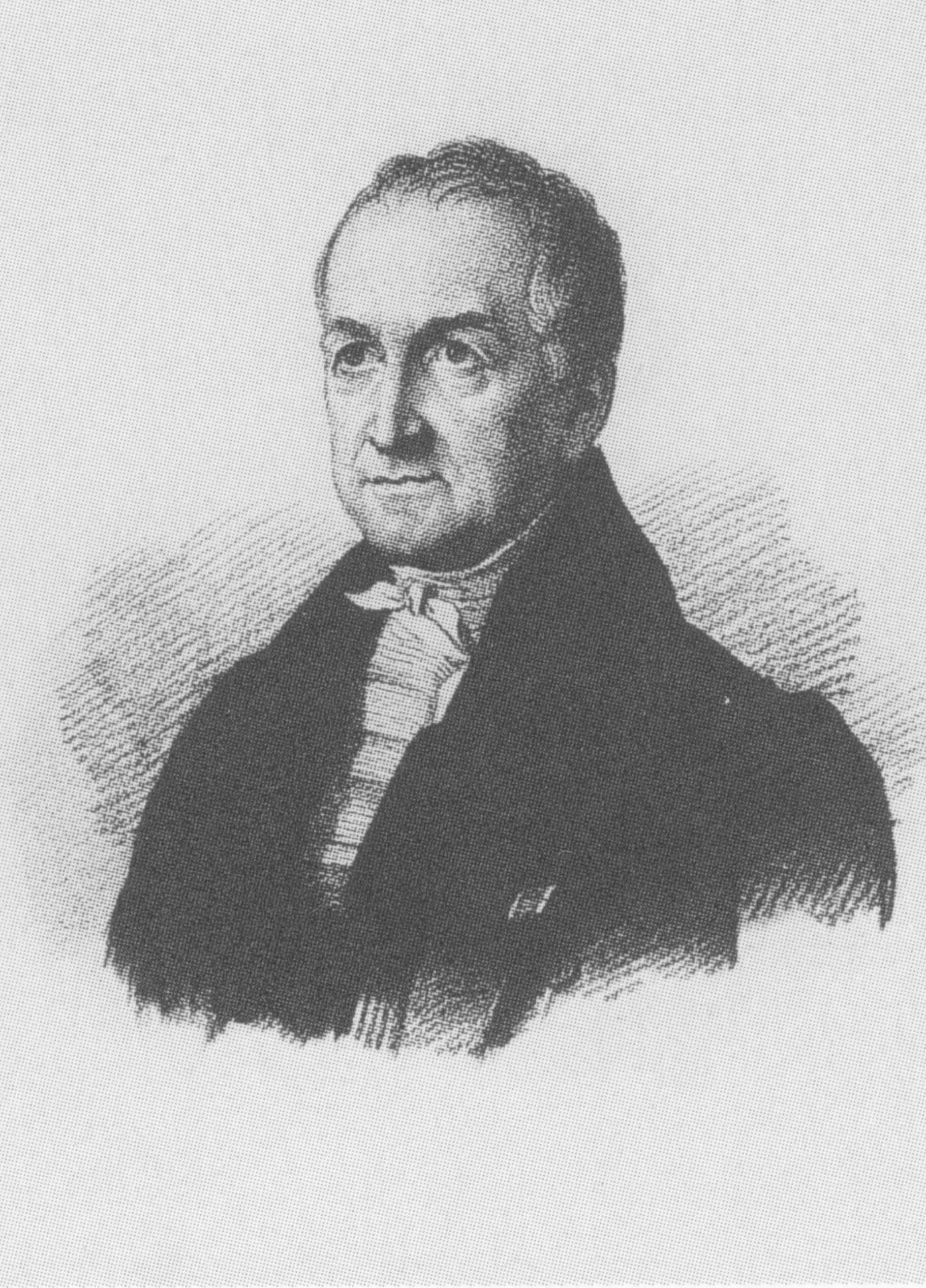
Christian Gottlob Leberecht Großmann

Christian Gottlob Leberecht Großmann (9 November 1783 in Prießnitz – 29 June 1857 in Leipzig) was a German theologian.

From 1802 he studied theology at the University of Jena, receiving his doctorate in 1805. From 1808 to 1811 he served as a substitute minister in his hometown of Prießnitz, and afterwards, was a minister in Gröbitz (1811–22) and an ecclesiastical superintendent in Altenburg (1823–28). In 1829 he was named pastor and superintendent at the St. Thomas Church in Leipzig.

On six occasions he served as dean to the theological faculty at Leipzig University. As a professor, his studies largely involved New Testament exegesis, Saxon church law and contemporary history. He held a particular interest in the works of Jewish-Hellenistic philosopher Philo of Alexandria.

In 1831 he became a member of the First Chamber of the Saxon Landtag. Known for his moderate-liberal views, he strove for abolition of the death penalty and advocated religious intermarriage between Protestants and Catholics. He is regarded as founder of the Gustav-Adolf-Verein, a society in which he served as its first president.

== Selected works ==
- Alcæi Mytilenæ reliquiæ (fragments by Alcaeus); with August Heinrich Matthiae, 1827.
- Lexici Platonici specimen I., 1828.
- Quaestiones Philoneae (2 parts, 1829).
- De philosophiae Judaeorum sacrae vestigiis nonnullis in Epistola ad Hebraeos conspicuis, 1833.
- Ueber eine Reformation der protestantischen Kirchenverfassung im Königreich Sachsen, 1833 – On a reformation of the Protestant Church constitution in the Kingdom of Saxony.
- De collegio Pharisaeorum commentatio, 1851.
- Philonis Iudaei Anecdoton graecum de cherubinis : ad Exod. 25. 18 (edition and interpretation of Philo), 1856.
