= Carl Zimmermann =

Carl (or Karl) Zimmermann (or Zimmerman) may refer to:

== Military men ==
- Carl Heinrich Zimmermann (1864–1949), German military officer
- Karl Zimmermann (admiral), promoted to admiral in 1911 (List of admirals of Germany)

== Sportspeople ==
- Karl Zimmermann (sport shooter) (1894–1986), Swiss sports shooter
- Carl Zimmerman (cricketer) (1898–1969), New Zealand cricketer

== Television personalities ==
- Carl Zimmermann (news anchor) (c. 1918–2014), American television journalist
- Carl Zimmerman (producer) (born 1929), American producer and talent agent

== Others ==
- Karl Zimmermann (theologian) (1803–1877), German Protestant theologian
- Carl Johann Christian Zimmermann (1831–1911), German architect and chief of works
- Carl Zimmermann (politician) (born 1951), American politician from Florida
