= Pforta monastery =

- Kloster Pforta, sometimes Pforte
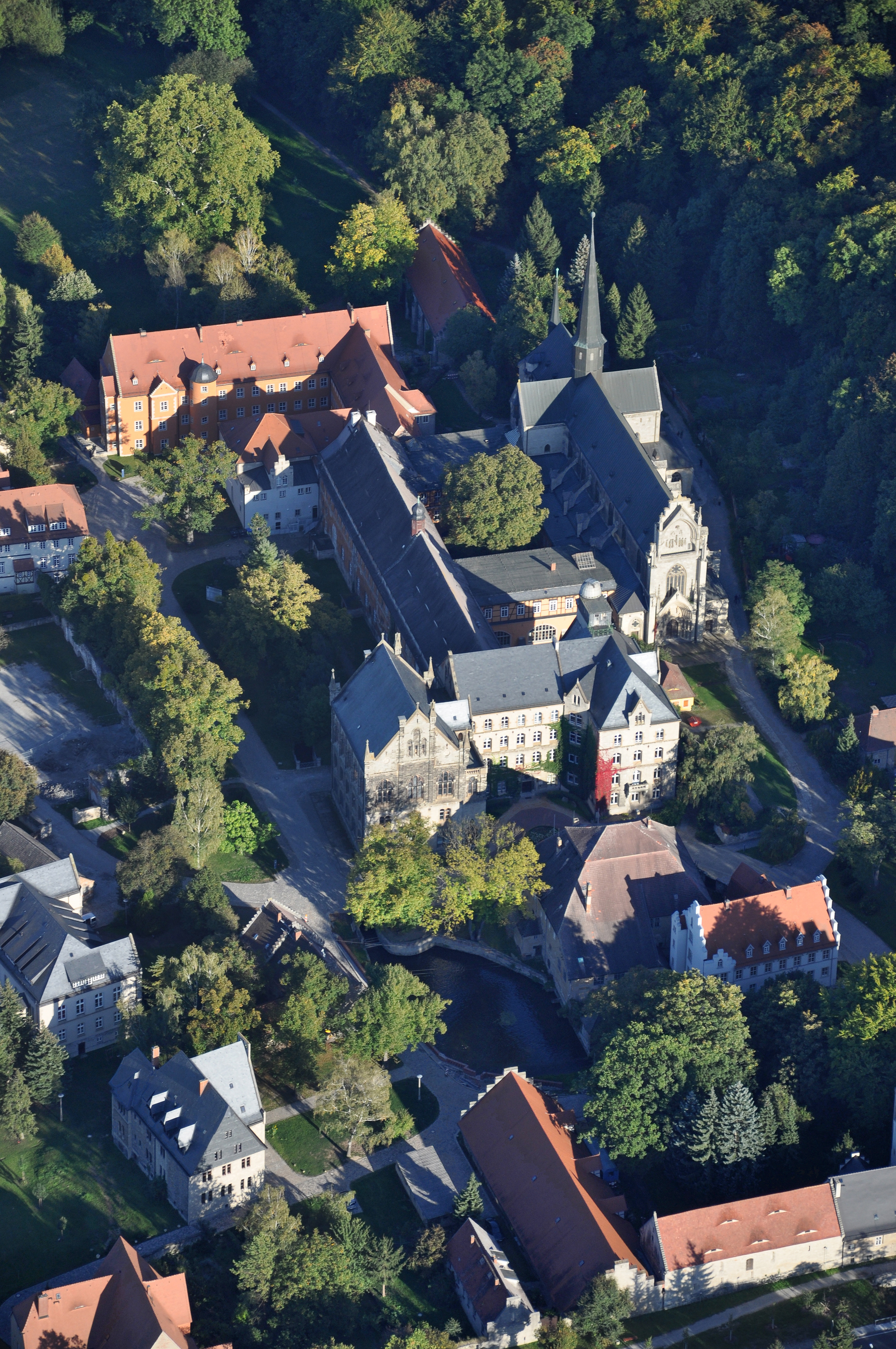
- Pforta seen from the air

- Location within Saxony-Anhalt Location within Germany
- Interactive map of Pforta monastery

Monastery information
- Other name: Sancta Maria ad Portam (Sankt Marien zur Pforte)
- Order: Cistercians
- Established: 1137
- Disestablished: 1540

Architecture
- Status: reused in school buildings
- Style: Romanesque and Gothic

Site
- Location: Bad Kösen, Saxony-Anhalt
- Coordinates: 51°12′56″N 11°45′18″E
- Public access: yes (partial)

The Pforta monastery is a former Cistercian monastery located near Naumburg in Saxony-Anhalt, Germany. It was established in the 1130s and prospered in the Middle Ages. In the course of the Reformation the monastery was disbanded in 1540. Today the buildings are used by the school Landesschule Pforta. The site is located on the tourist route Romanesque Road and has been nominated by Germany for inclusion in the UNESCO list of World Heritage Sites.

== History ==
Bishop Udo I of Naumburg who belonged to the House of the Ludowingers, met the Cistercian abbot Bernard of Clairvaux for the first time at the Imperial Diet in Liège in March 1131. This meeting can be seen as of central significance for the propagation of the Cistercian order in the Empire. For Bishop Udo I, it provided both motivation and opportunity to arrange for a delegation of monks from the Walkenried Cistercian monastery to settle in a location in the vicinity of the bishop's town of Naumburg in 1137/1138.

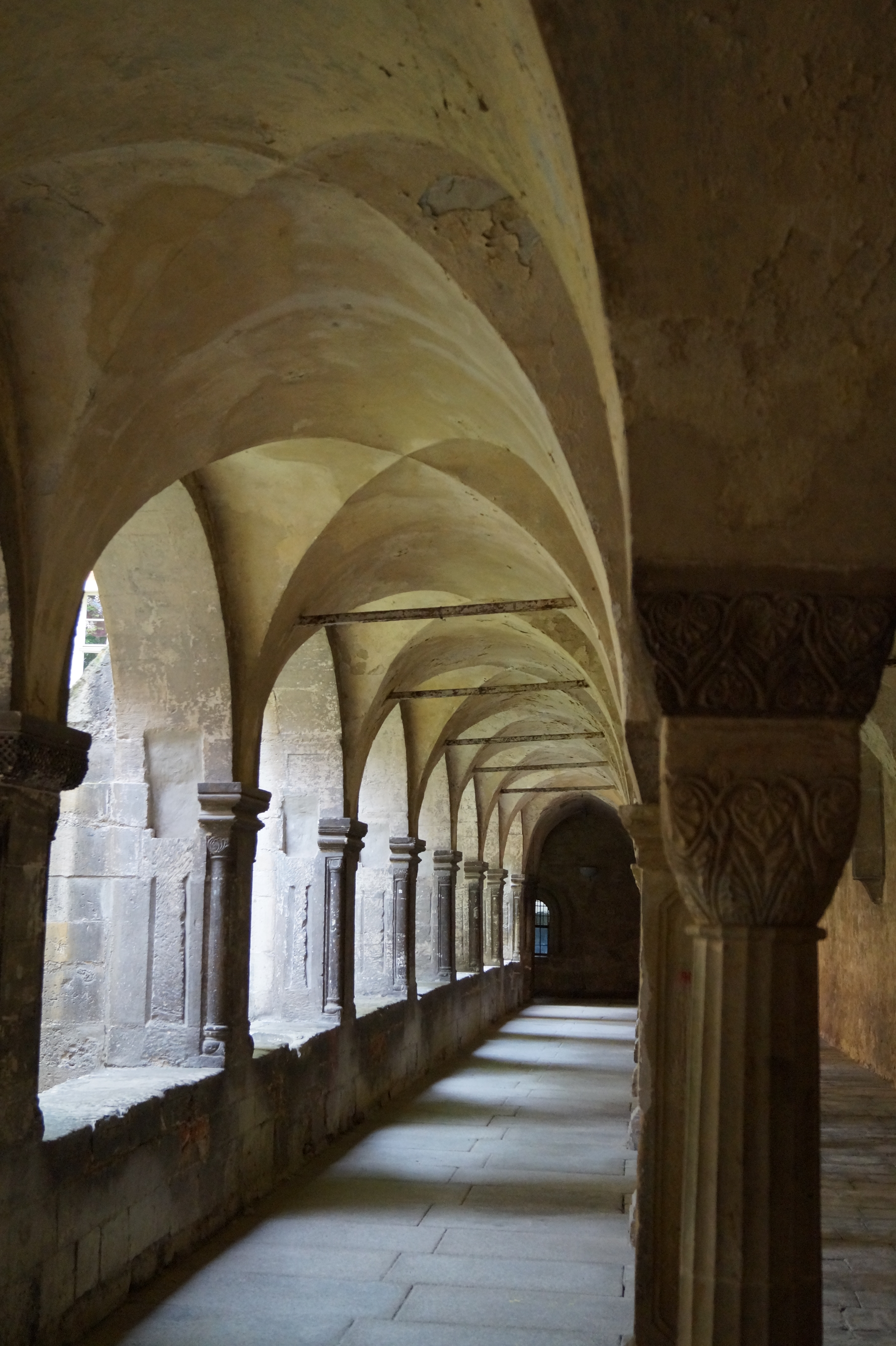
Cloister

The monastery complex itself comprises the religious, as well as residential and functional buildings: the "minster" (church), the cloister and the abbot's chapel as well as numerous functional buildings from the monastery time and the mill stream Kleine Saale which flows through the monastery property. Pforta ranked among the wealthiest and most influential monasteries throughout Central Germany before it was closed in the course of the Reformation. Today, the premises host a public boarding school run by the state of Saxony-Anhalt.

== Description ==
=== Central monastic premises ===
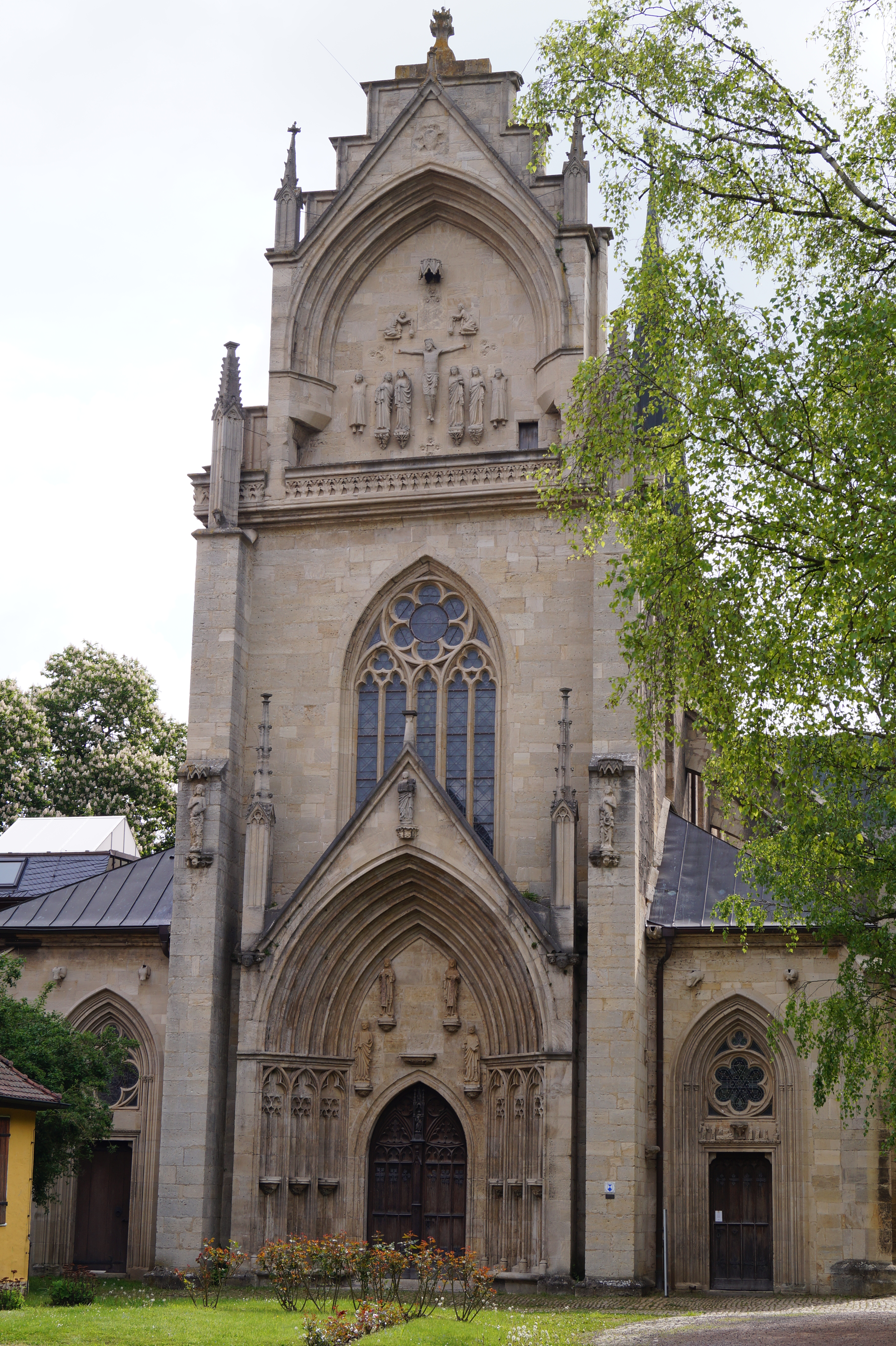
Facade of the church

The richly ornamented western façade of the minster differs from façade designs of other Cistercian churches from the 13th century since it displays sculptural designs that did not correspond to the strict stipulations of the order. It is reminiscent of a Roman triumphal arch portal. This elaborately designed facade with its sculptural decoration symbolically expressed the meaning of the Latinised monastery name of Porta, meaning Porta Coeli – i.e. "Gate of Heaven" – through its architecture. It has been described as the ″most brilliant example of a towerless façade in Germany″.

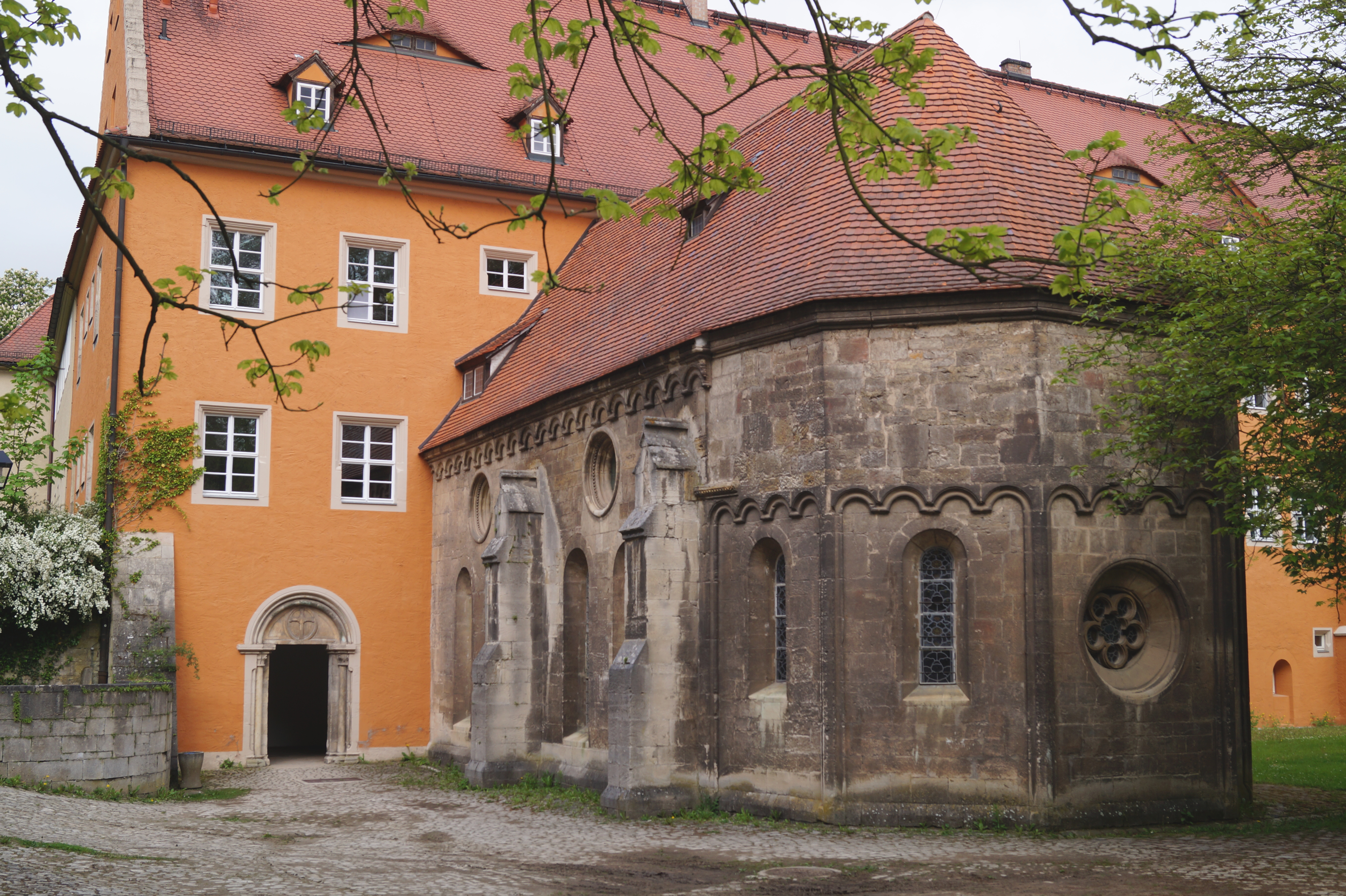
So-called Abbot's Chapel of Pforta monastery

As a sign of the economic power of the monastery, the Cistercians were able to commission a new church and abbot's chapel (Abtskapelle) between 1251 and 1268, both of which are of artistic and architectural quality. Rare elements were still to be found in the structure such as the latrine and the chamber of the infirmary. It constitutes the high point of Romanesque interior design in the local cultural landscape and stands out thanks to the opulent and yet balanced profiles of the wall design above the columns with their many shaft tori and leaping impost heights.

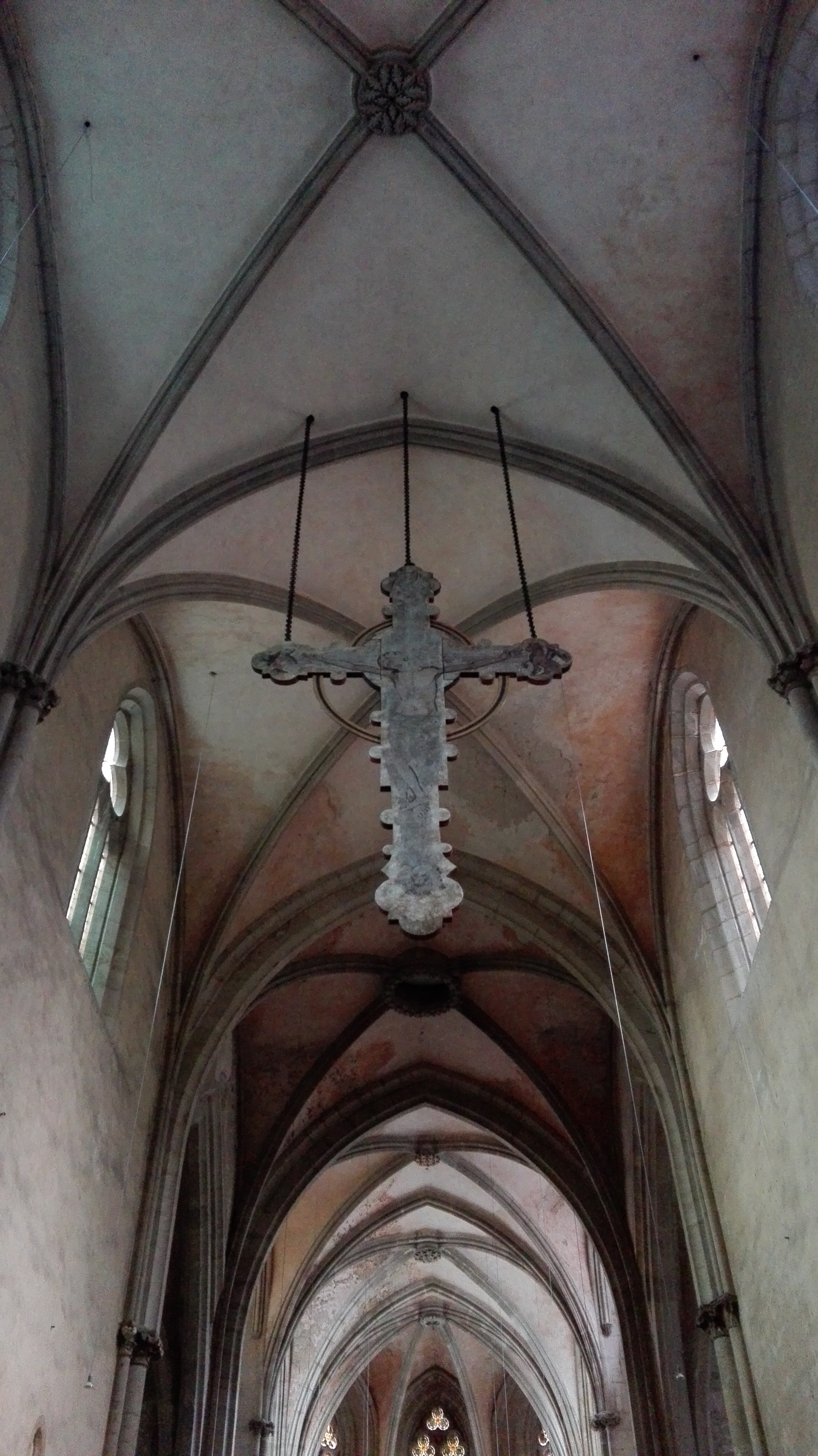
Nave and wooden Cistercian cross (13th century)

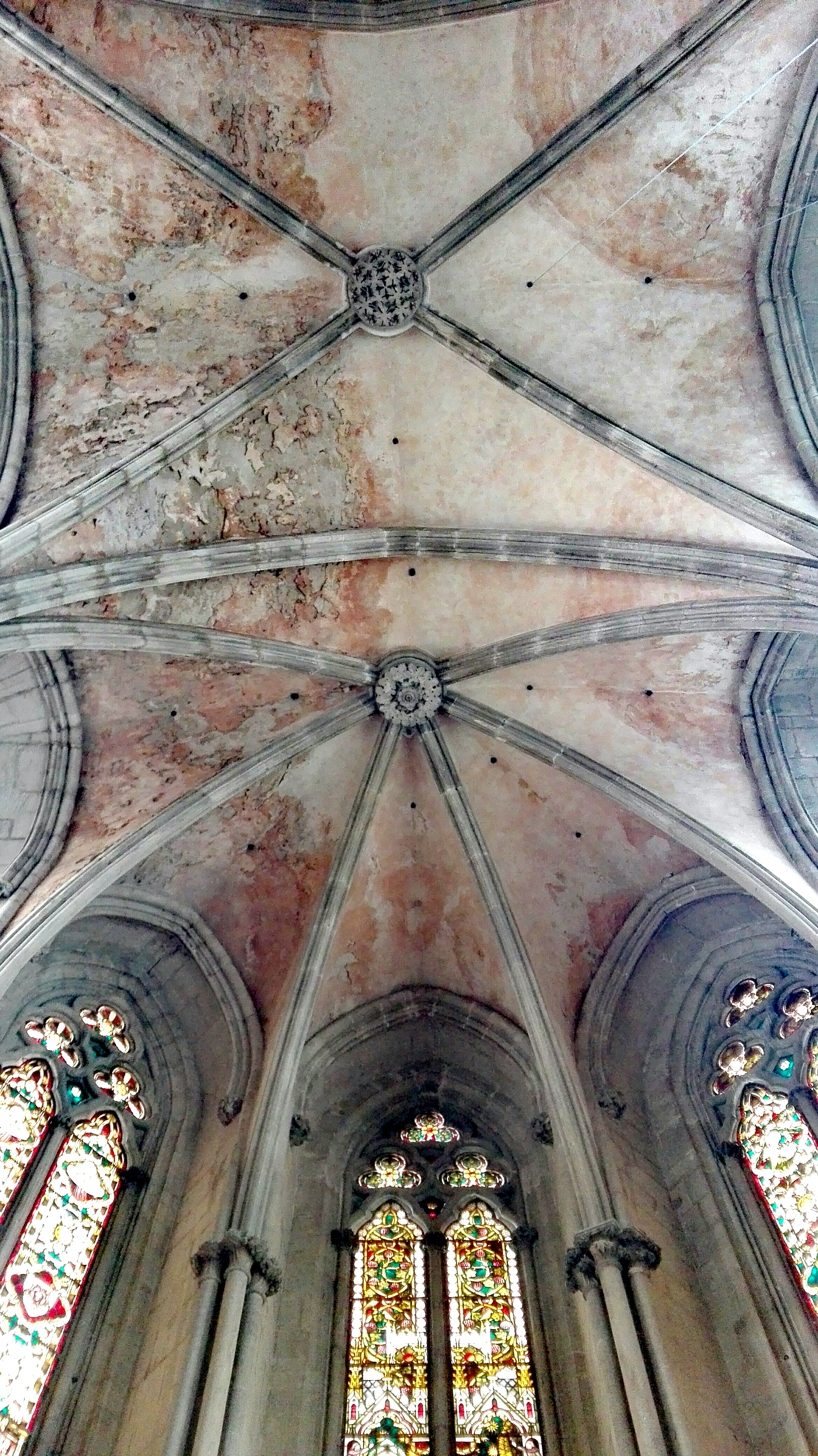
Choir vault

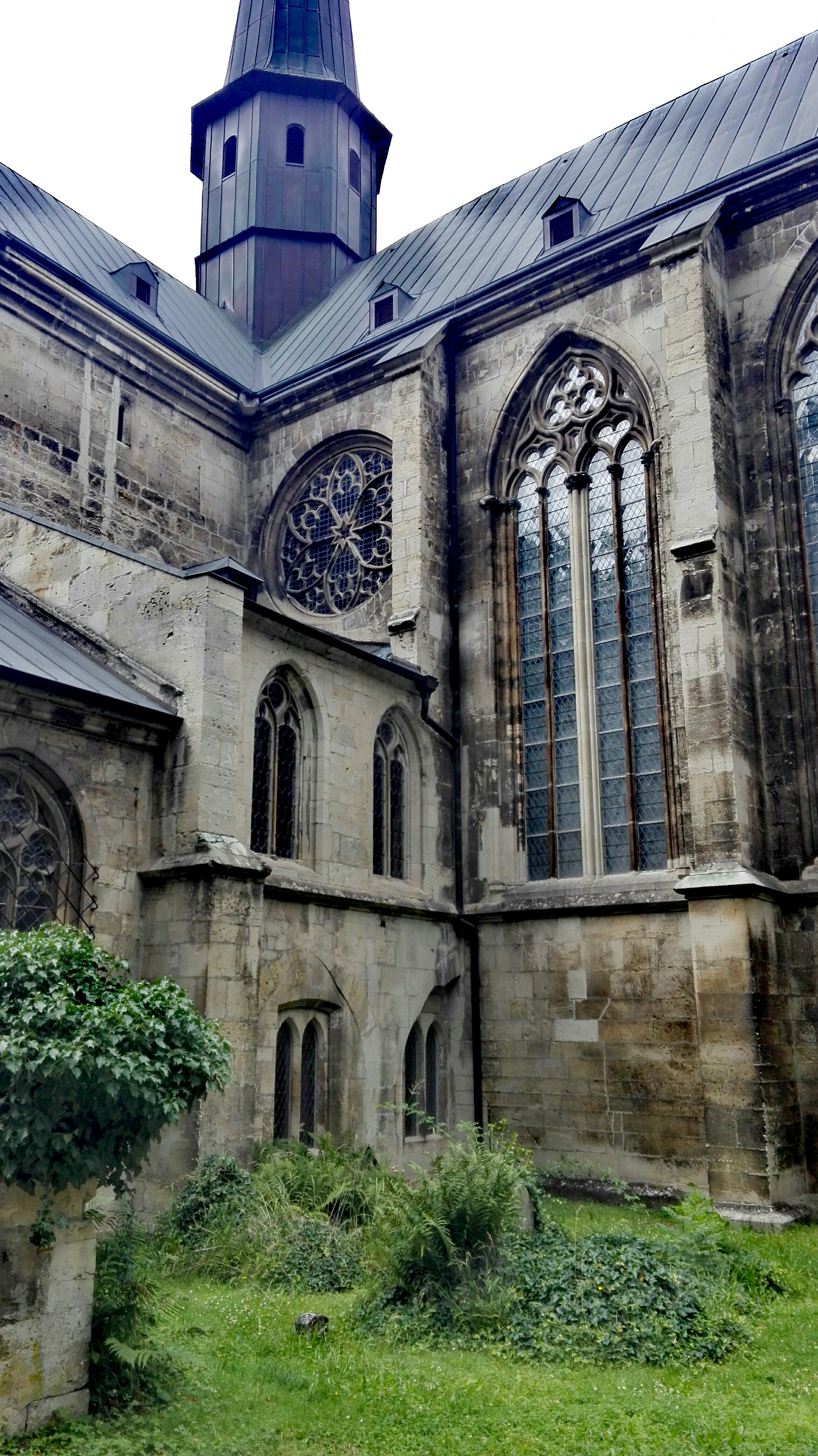
Cistercian church, exterior view of the choir and crossing

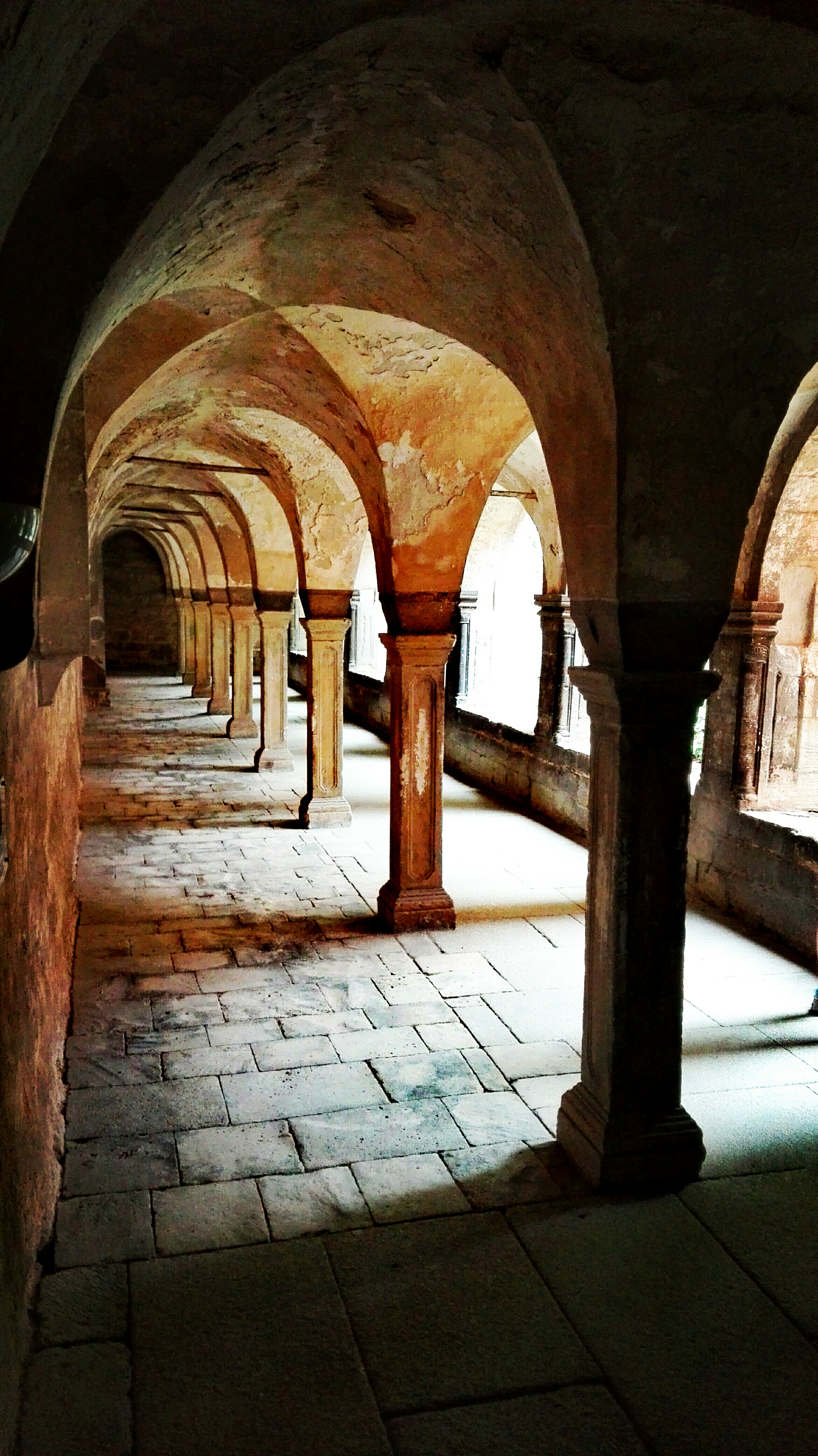
Cloisters south side

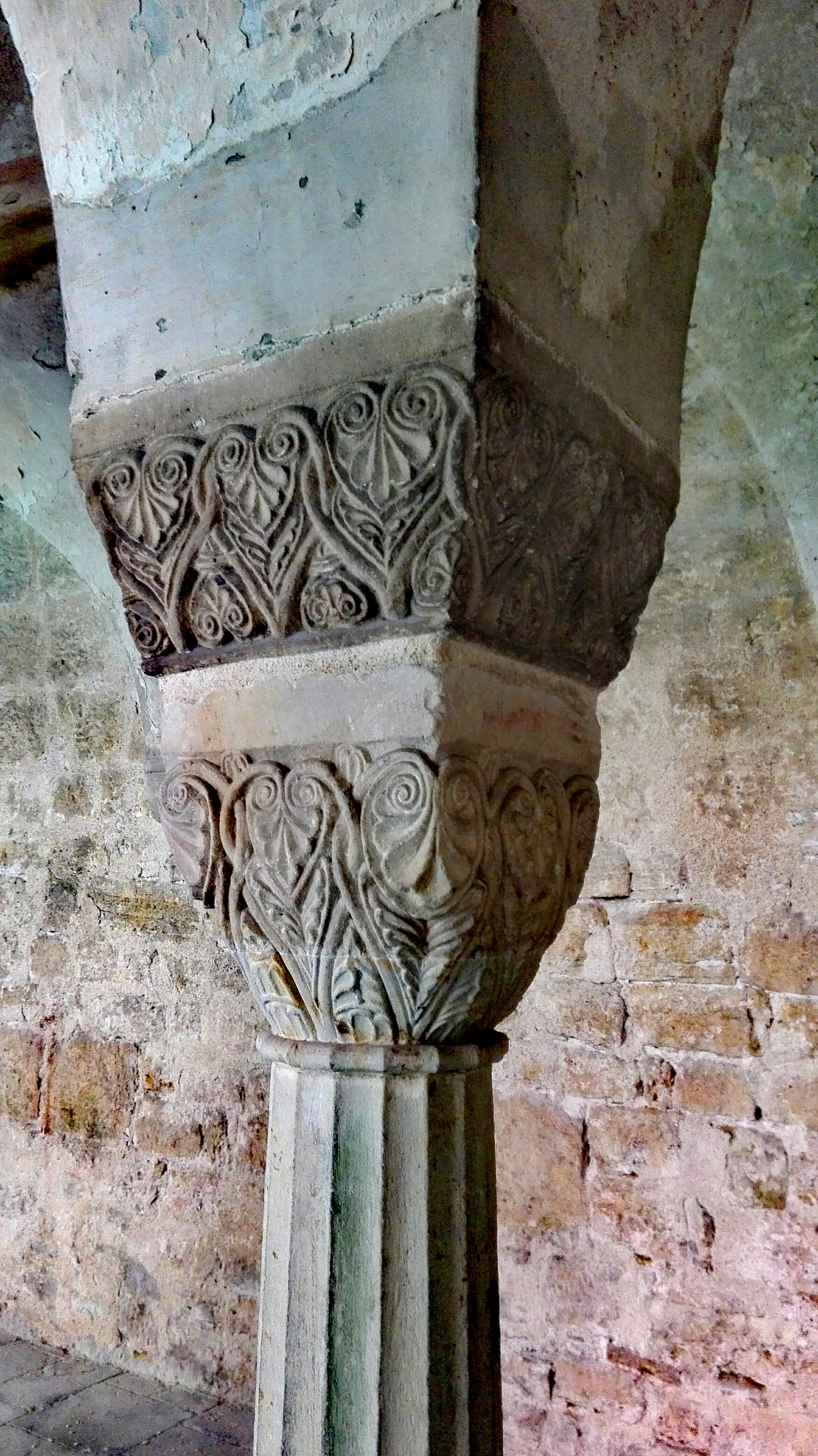
Romanesque masonry in the cloisters

=== Grange ===
Located in Kösen, the so-called "Romanesque House" is an example of a former grange of Pforta monastery. It is situated above the weir in Kösen and was first referred to in a papal deed of confirmation from 1138. The one-storey building that has survived is dated to the third quarter of the 12th century. The grange was run by bearded lay brothers (conversi), including their own mills, workshops and efficient water supply systems in order to enhance the economic independence of the Cistercians.

The Cistercians managed to enlist parts of the peasant population into their service, offering the liege lords compensation payments for their release from personal bondage. These people partly worked as conversi, lay brothers, supporting the Cistercians’ local grange economy, and partly they were sent as groups to resettle in Silesia, Greater Poland or the Baltic region through the agency and assistance of the Cistercian Order. If the monastery's own financial resources were not adequate for such endeavours, Pforta was able to borrow large amounts of money within the Cistercian Order, foremost from the primary abbey of Clairvaux. Over time, Pforta was thus able to establish a sphere of domination within the area surrounding the monastery.

=== Kleine Saale ===
For 1180, it is documented that the Cistercians were given permission to build a Saale weir between Wenzendorf on the west bank of the Saale and Kösen. The construction of this weir was linked to the building of a canal of some 10 kilometres in length, which still exists today and runs from Bad Kösen via Pforta to just outside Naumburg. It has been called the "Kleine Saale" (Little Saale) since the 13th century. This canal was designed not only to supply drinking and domestic water to the monastery but also to drive a number of mills in Kösen, at Pforta monastery and in Altenburg (Almrich). The mill at Pforte is a monumental, basically Romanesque stone structure, situated between the western monastery wall and the cloister area. A Romanesque chimney indicates that there used to be a blacksmith's workshop. With their elements of medieval architecture, the mill and blacksmith's building is one of the oldest preserved functional buildings in Central Germany. Several contracts show that the Benedictine monks of St George, the canons of St Moritz in Naumburg, and the Naumburg Cathedral chapter participated in the costs and maintenance of the Kleine Saale in return for rights of utilization of mill streams. A water expert from Pforta monastery and the highest-ranking fisherman from the Naumburg Cathedral chapter were assigned to perform the technical maintenance of the Kleine Saale and to settle any disputes.

=== Vineyards ===
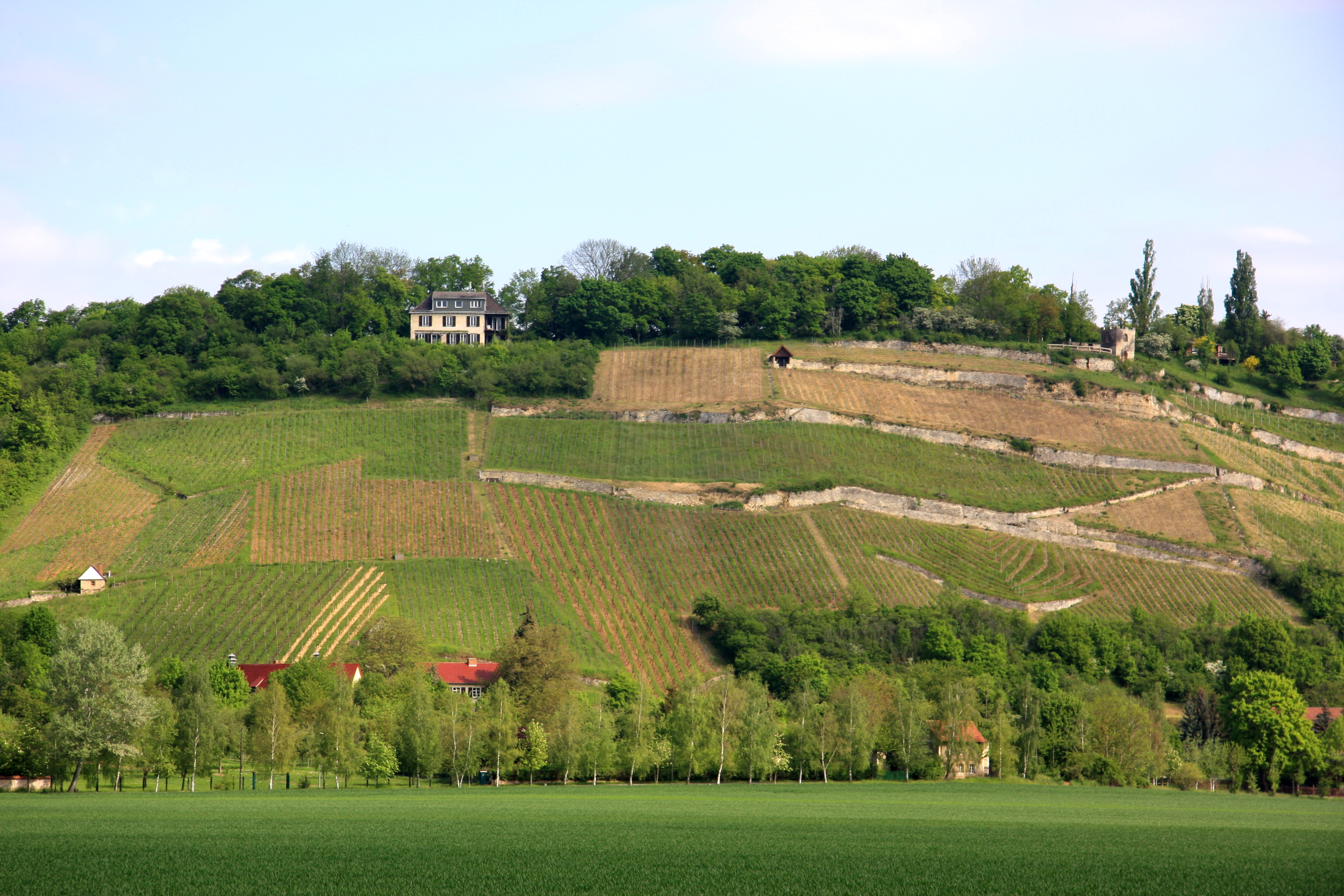
Steinmeister vineyard

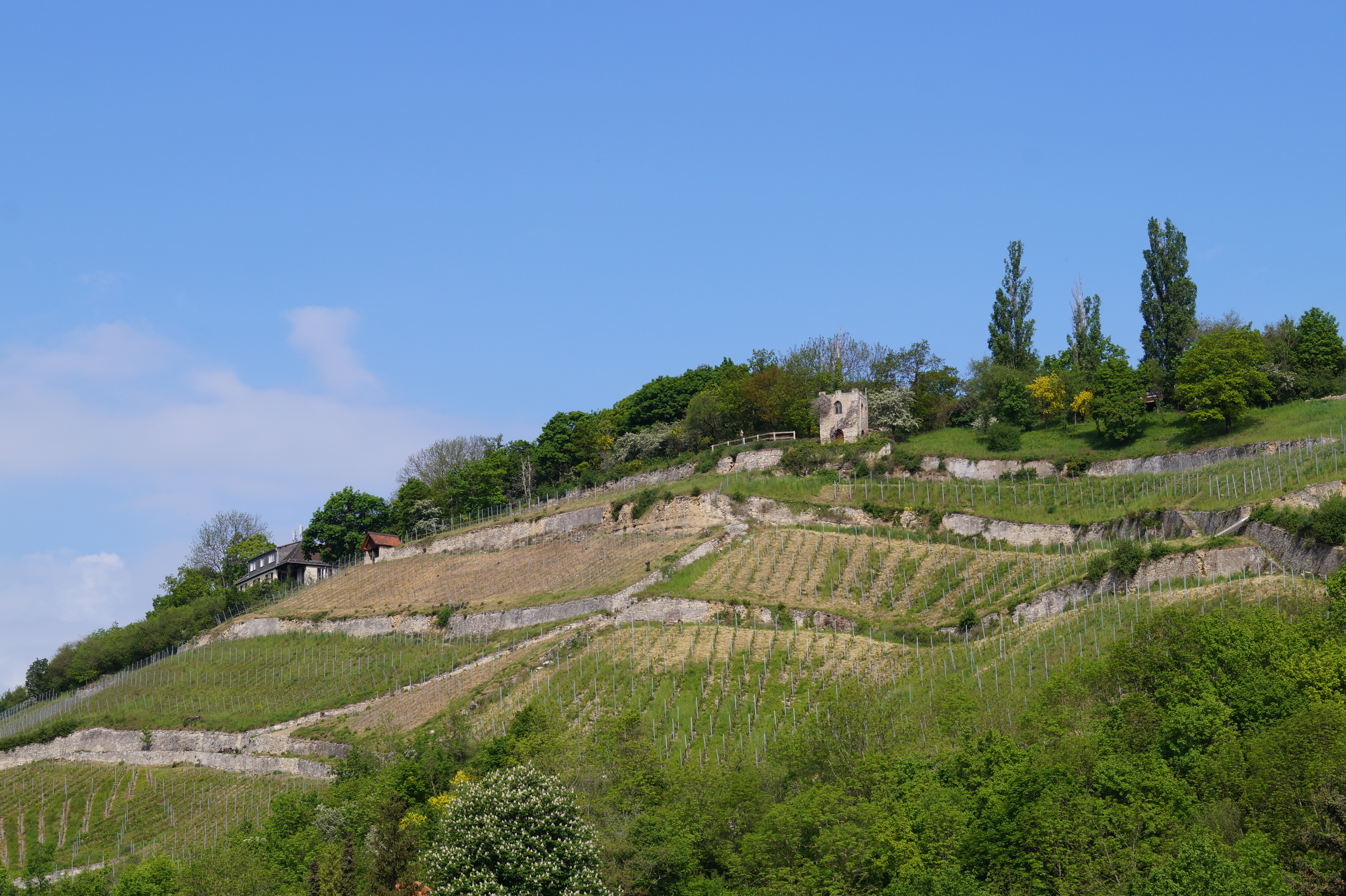
Vineyard

The Cistercians expanded their property from the Köppelberg vineyard, and created nine vineyards on Saalberg Hill between 1195 and 1208. The fact that they purchased that part of the hill above their own vineyard sites is an indication of the beginning of medieval steep slope cultivation, which is an important documentation of the increasing wine-growing activities on steep slopes. Hence, a large, continuous wine-growing area had been created by the monks of Pforta. At the end of the Middle Ages, the monastery owned 58 vineyards at 27 locations between Bad Kösen and Roßbach. According to the records, Pforta had cellar and wine masters (1229 magister vini) in the 13th century demonstrating highly developed wine-growing and wine-making. The vines were planted irregularly, and different grape varieties were planted together (documented in 1234). Between them, vegetables and other agricultural crops were planted on acres. Fruit-bearing trees or walnut trees as well as hops were also planted together with the vines. The vineyards were enclosed (first documented in 1268), and featured dry stone walls and terraces on the slopes, stairs, water drainage ditches or buildings as early as in the High Middle Ages.

== World heritage nomination ==
The monastery has been proposed by Germany for inscription in the List of World Heritage Sites. The World Heritage nomination Naumburg Cathedral and the High Medieval Cultural Landscape of the Rivers Saale and Unstrut is representative for the processes that shaped the continent during the High Middle Ages between 1000 and 1300: Christianization, the so-called Landesausbau, and the dynamics of cultural exchange and transfer characteristic for this very period. This cultural landscape was specifically shaped by the Cistercian monks of the Pforta monastery which developed into a driving force for the landscape as a whole during the High Middle Ages, fostering technology and agriculture, education, and eastward Christianization.
