= Gustav-Adolf-Werk =

German Evangelical Church society

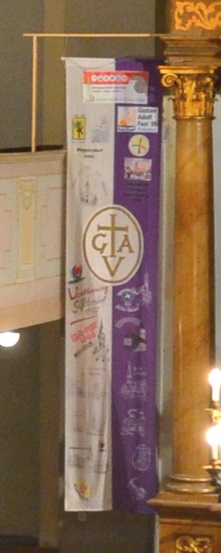
Flag of the Gustav-Adolf-Verein in the Protestant church of Sopron, Hungary

The Gustav-Adolf-Werk (GAW) is a society under the roof of the Evangelical Church in Germany (EKD) which has for its object the aid of feeble sister churches and congregations. It is responsible for the taking care of the diaspora work of the EKD, in cooperation with the EKD itself, its member churches and congregations. The organization started with a focus on the diaspora, but has separate branches internationally in the meanwhile. The organization in Austria is still called the Gustav-Adolf-Verein, which was the original name in Germany as well. Further terms used for the GAW in the past include Gustavus Adolphus Union, Gustav-Adolf-Stiftung and Evangelischer Verein der Gustav-Adolf-Stiftung.

== Origin of the name ==
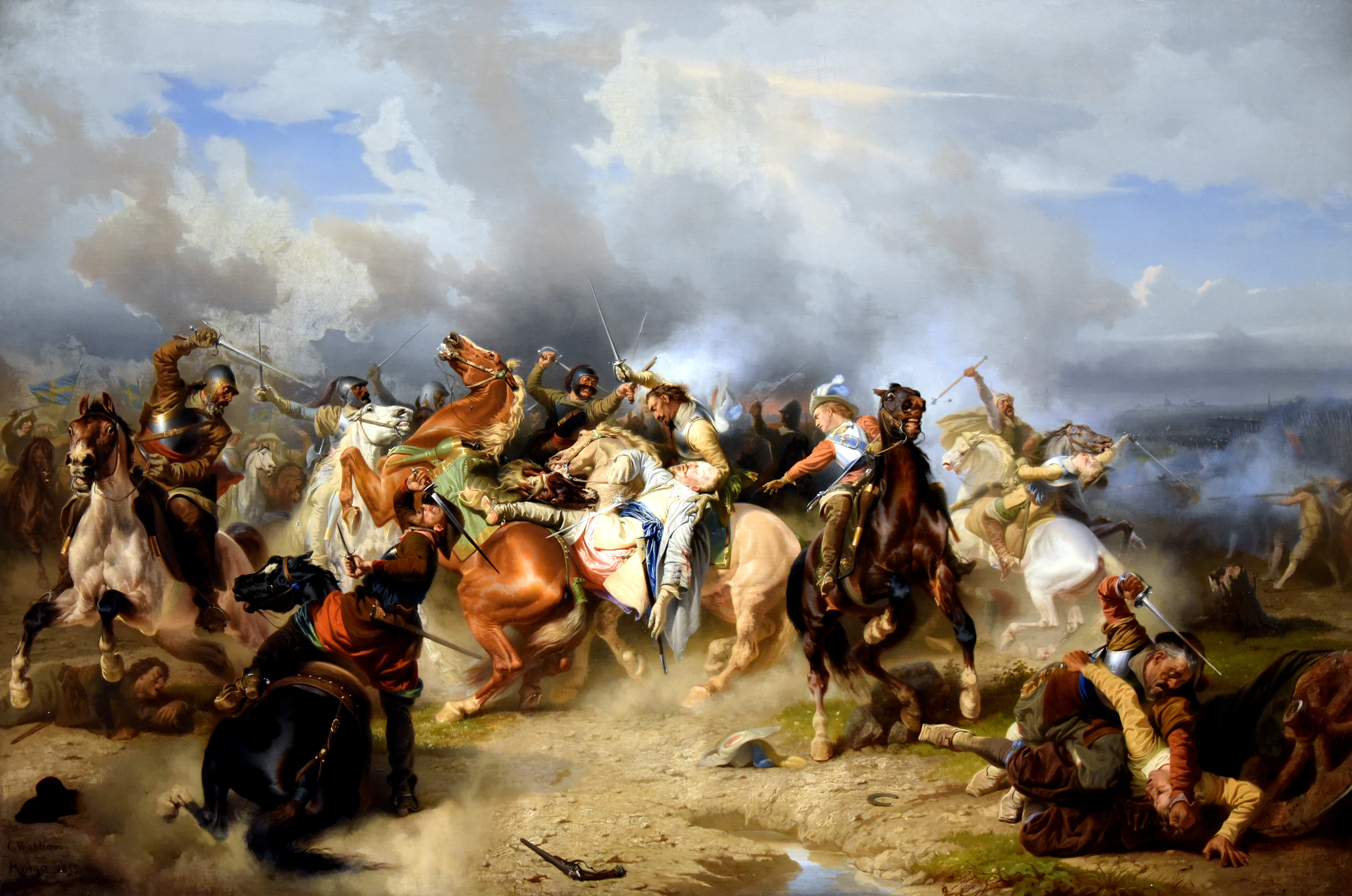
The Battle of Lützen by Carl Wahlbom shows the death of King Gustavus Adolphus on 16 November 1632.

The Battle of Lützen (1632) was a decisive battle of the Thirty Years' War. It was a Protestant victory, but cost the life of one of the most important leaders of the Protestant alliance, Gustavus Adolphus of Sweden, which caused the Protestant campaign to lose direction later. Near the spot where Gustavus Adolphus fell, a granite boulder was placed in position on the day after the battle. A canopy of cast iron was erected over this "Swedes' stone" (German: Schwedenstein) in 1832, and close by, a chapel, built by Oskar Ekman, a citizen of Gothenburg (d. 1907), was dedicated on 6 November 1907. The fallen king is remembered every year in Sweden, on Gustavus Adolphus Day the 6 November with Gustavus Adolphus pastry.

== Founding of the GAW foundation ==
The project of forming such a society was first broached in connexion with the bicentennial celebration of the battle of Lützen on November 6, 1632. A proposal to collect funds for a larger monument to Gustavus Adolphus having been agreed to. The existing memorial, a simple stone at a crossing where the King had died, was rather popular with the locals (and some newspapers), which did not want to have it replaced by a more pompous statue. It was then suggested by Superintendent Grossmann that the best memorial to the great champion of Protestantism would be the formation of a union for propagating his ideas. It quickly gained popularity. Großmann and others of the time saw Gustavus Adolphus as a symbol for religious freedom and self-determination. It was helpful to set a new goal for the Gustaph Adolphus Memorial. Before the GAW's foundation, Großmann had dealt, at the start of the 1830s, with problems of the Protestant community in Fleißen (now Plesná, Czech Republic). The local congregation had been bullied by the Catholic (Austrian) administration and e.g. disallowed for the locals to join church services and schools of the neighbouring Bad Brambach as before.

The use of a foundation itself was not very successful in the start, as it did not allow for very active membership. For some years the society was limited in its area and its operations, being practically confined to Leipzig and Dresden. When Karl Zimmermann, a pastor and journalist from Darmstadt, used the Reformation festival in 1841 to found an association in support of the diaspora via public appeal, he did not mention the GAW at all. Zimmermann (1803–1877), court preacher at Darmstadt, achieved to mobilize a larger audience.

== Enlargement to the Gustav-Adolf-Union ==
The two founders and the respective organizations found a way to merge both projects. In 1843 a general meeting was held at Frankfurt-am-Main, where no fewer than twenty-nine branch associations (vereine) belonging to all parts of Germany except Bavaria and Austria were represented.

The want of a positive creed tended to make many of the stricter Protestant churchmen doubtful of the usefulness of the union, and the stricter Lutherans have always held aloof from it. At a general convention held in Berlin in September 1846 a keen internal dispute arose about the admission of the Königsberg delegate, Julius Rupp (1809-1884), who in 1845 had been deprived for publicly repudiating the Athanasian Creed and became one of the founders of the "Free Congregations"; and at one time it seemed likely that the society would be completely broken up. On the other hand, GAW's comparable critical attitude in relation to Roman Catholicism was shared in a broad audience, expressed in the later Kulturkampf and as well in the relationship with Austria and France.

Amid the political revolutions of the year 1848 the whole movement fell into stagnation; but in 1849 another general convention (the seventh), held at Breslau, showed that, although the society had lost both in membership and income in the meanwhile, it was still possessed of considerable vitality. From that date the Gustav-Adolf-Verein has been more definitely "evangelical" in its tone than formerly; and under the direction of Karl Zimmermann it greatly increased both in numbers and in wealth. It had already then built over 2,000 churches and assisted with some two million pounds (19th century figure) over 5,000 different communities.

Apart from its influence in maintaining Protestantism in hostile areas, there can be no doubt that the union has had a great effect in helping the various Protestant churches of Germany to realize the array and value of their common interests. The GAW started early (in 1851) to involve women's associations and public lectures. The de:Protestantenpatent, the acknowledgement of Protestatants in Austria 1861 allowed to expand to Austria, the GAW membership of the Austrian Protestants is and was comparable high.

== 20th century ==
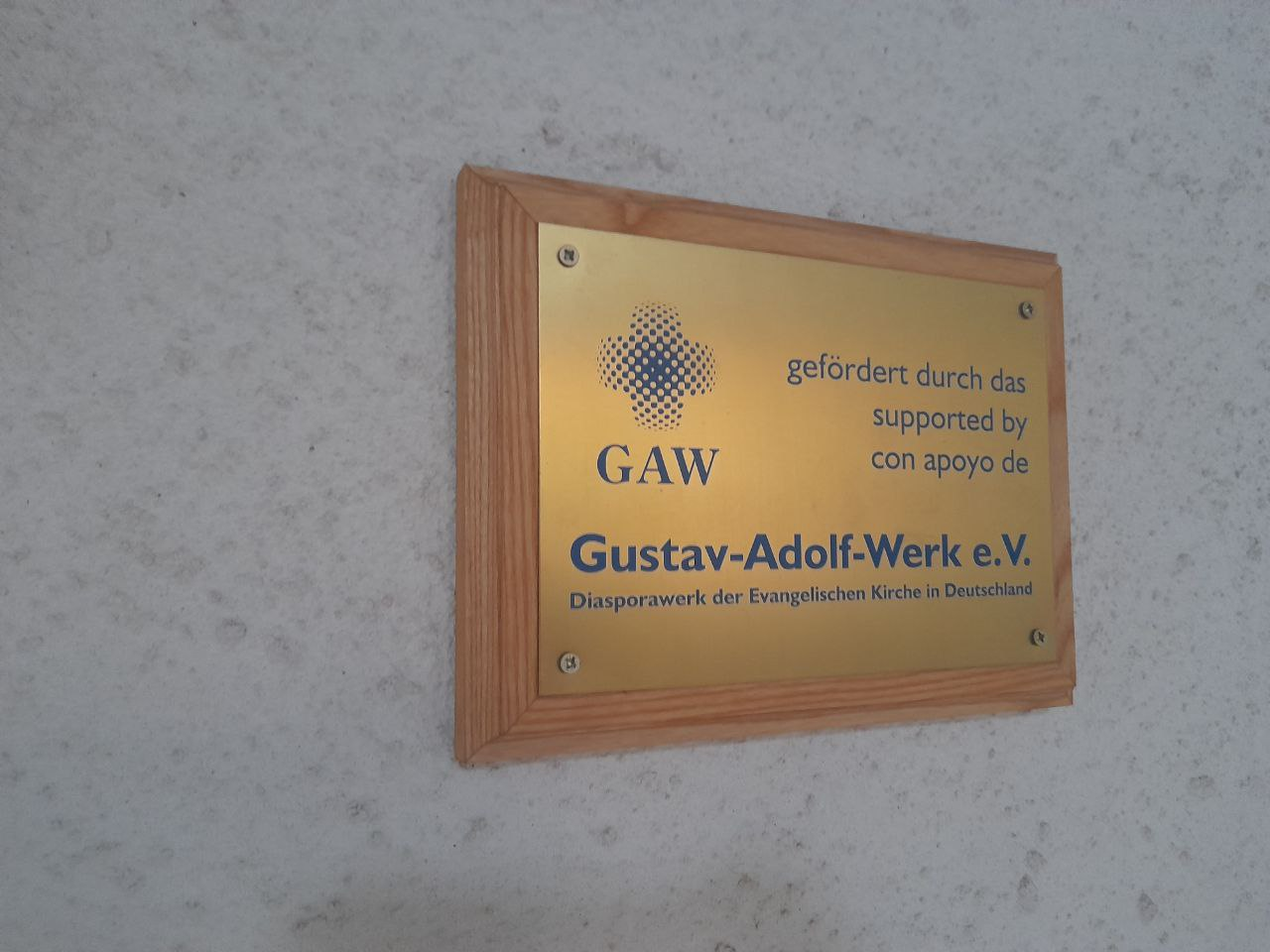
Gustav-Adolf-Werk sign in the Lutheran Church in Yaroslavl

Under the leadership of Hans Gerber (1934–1944), the first lawyer, and among the only non presidents with a non theologician background, the Gustav Adolf Werk was comparable close to the regime and the Deutsche Christen. de:Gerhard Heinzelmann replaced him 1944, he was a more liberal member of the neohumanist de: Spirituskreis and, similar to Ernst Wagner, a founding member of the CDU, the German Christian Democrats. The first congregation of the GAW after WWII took place in Fulda, the East West conflict lead to a separation in Kassel 1963 and a Leipzig, working along the lines of "Kassel got the money, Leipzig the tradition". The GAW tried to manage its cohesion despite the fact of the separation of Germany. However, with Johannes Hoffmann as first "Eastern" president, the political divide forced to set up two organizations starting from 1971. 1992 the GAW was the first major entity of the EKD, that moved to the East, back its former headquarter in Leipzig and integrated the organization. 1994, with the 400 anniversary of King Gustav, the Swedish royal family visited the GAW in Leipzig. The perception of lack of political correctness of the name resulted in some internal criticism, the organization uses GAW as its brand nowadays. The current approach is to gain interest for Protestant diaspora churches worldwide, the GAW as well interacts with immigrants from such regions, as possible messengers in their home countries.

== Role within the German churches ==
The GAW had a role in unifying various Protestant views in a popular movement across the various confessions within German Protestantism. It constrains cooperation and aid to the members of the Leuenberger Konkordie (Community of Protestant Churches in Europe) and its affiliates worldwide.

=== Current activities ===
Since 2011, the GAW started to involve partnerships with e.g. the „Fellowship of Middle East Evangelical Churches" (FMEEC) and has done so with the GEKE in Egypt and Syria but has as well ongoing talks with the presbyterian Church on Cuba (compare religion in Cuba). In the other hand, it may stop the current cooperation with the Bulgarian Evangelical Alliance, as it contains various churches beyond the Leuenberg setup. With regard to the French Protestantic Federation, the GAW confines its cooperation on those members, which are within the Leuenberger concorde. 2015 will include for the first time a project in Cuba, as the GAW envisages installing a community house in Havana. Various current projects serve Protestant Christians under oppression, as for the Evangelical Church of Egypt (compare Persecution of Copts) and Christianity in Syria, a major part of the budget includes educational tasks.

2015 the GAW installed its first female president and a second from Württembergische Landeskirche, Gabriele Wulz. Wulz intends to assure awareness about diaspora topics in different parts of the EKD.

== Presidents ==
- Christian Gottlob Leberecht Großmann (1783–1857); 1843–1857
- Ewald Hoffmann (1808–1875); 1857–1874
- Gustav Adolf Fricke (1875–1900); 1874–1899
- Oskar Pank (1822–1908); 1900–1908
- Bruno Härtung (1846–1919); 1908–1917
- Franz Rendtorff (1860–1937); 1917–1934
- Hans Gerber (1889–1981); 1934–1944
- Gerhard Heinzelmann (1884–1951); 1944–1951
- Ernst Wagner (1907–1973); 1951–58
- Fritz Hermann Hauß (1889–1976); 1959–1963 GAW (West)
- Hans Jungbluth (1920–1968); 1964–1968 GAW (West)
- Hans Katz (1900–1974); 1968–1970 GAW (West), 1970–1974 GAW (EKD)
- Günter Besch (1904–1999); 1975–1978 GAW (EKD)
- Hermann Rieß (1914–1990); 1979–1988 GAW (EKD)
- Dietrich Gang (1934–); 1989–1992 GAW (EKD)

GAW in Eastern Germany

- Johannes Hoffmann (theologian) (1910–1977); 1971–1977 GAW (DDR)
- Rolf Stubbe (1922–1985); 1978–1985 GAW (DDR)
- Ebergard Winkler (1933–); 1987–1992 GAW (East)

GAW after reunification

- Karl-Christoph Epting (1940–); 1992–2004
- Wilhelm Hüffmeier (1941–); 2004–2015
- Gabriele Wulz (1959–); 2016–
