= Lutheran Church of Saint Peter and Saint Paul (Yaroslavl) =

Lutheran church in Yaroslavl

- Russian: Церковь Святых Петра и Павла German: Kirche der Heiligen Peter und Paul
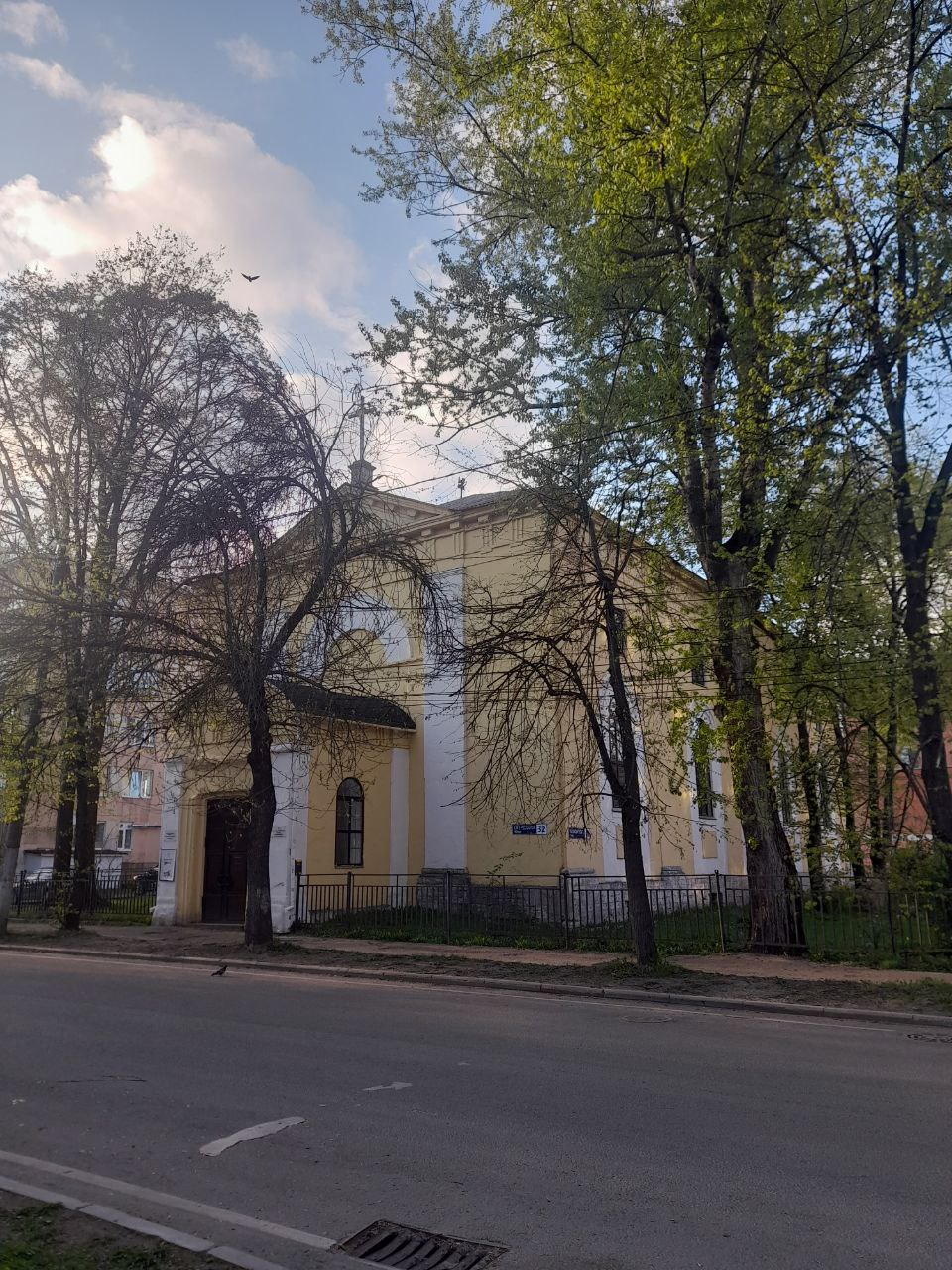

Religion
- Affiliation: Lutheran
- Governing body: Evangelical Lutheran Church of the European part of Russia
- Status: Active

Location
- Location: Sverdlov 32, Yaroslavl, Russia
- Interactive map of Lutheran Church of Saint Peter and Saint Paul
- Coordinates: 57°37′49″N 39°52′26″E

Architecture
- Architect: Peter Pankov
- Style: Russian classicism
- Completed: 1849

Website
- https://vk.com/yarluther

Church of Saints Peter and Paul (Russian: Церковь Святых Петра и Павла also known as Кирха Петра и Павла.)— is an Evangelical Lutheran church in Yaroslavl, Russia. It was built in the 1840s at the corner of Borisoglebskaya and Lyubimskaya streets. It is the last work of the architect Peter Pankov and has been identified as an object of cultural heritage in Russia.

The community of the church belongs to the Central Priest of the Evangelical Lutheran Church of the European part of Russia.

== History ==
=== During the Russian Empire ===
It is not known exactly when the first Lutheran church was built in Yaroslavl, but after the Thirty Years' War a large number of Protestant soldiers appeared in the Tsardom of Russia and, in particular, in Yaroslavl. They built a small wooden church in the city.

In 1742, the Duke of the Duchy of Courland and Semigallia Ernst Johann Biron was exiled to Yaroslavl for 19 years, with whom his family doctor and at the same time pastor Gove went into exile. After the departure of Biron in 1762, and with him the pastor Gauvet, the believers were left without constant spiritual care.

In 1817, a small Lutheran community was formed in Yaroslavl, however, as yet deprived of official status and its own pastor. Independent communities in Russia were allowed to be created only in 1832, when Nicholas I signed the "Decree on the official status of the Evangelical Lutheran Church." After that, the communities began to unite into church districts.

In 1840, Nicholas I visited Yaroslavl, the city church council filed a petition for the construction of a Lutheran church, providing him with a project and a cost estimate. The Committee of Ministers approved them on 22 September 1842. The General Treasury allocated 3428 rubles for the construction, which were added to the donations collected by the Lutheran community of the city from the moment the petition was submitted. At the request of Duke Peter of Oldenburg, the emperor donated 12,000 rubles for the construction of the church.

Initially, the construction of a Lutheran church was planned on Boris and Gleb Square, where the Orthodox churches of the same name were previously located. However, such a decision was resisted by the Russian Orthodox Church and the construction of the Lutheran church was decided to be moved to Borisoglebskaya Street. The laying of the church took place in the spring of 1845, but due to lack of money, construction was delayed until 1849. In 1847, a bell appeared in the church. The first church service took place only in January 1850.

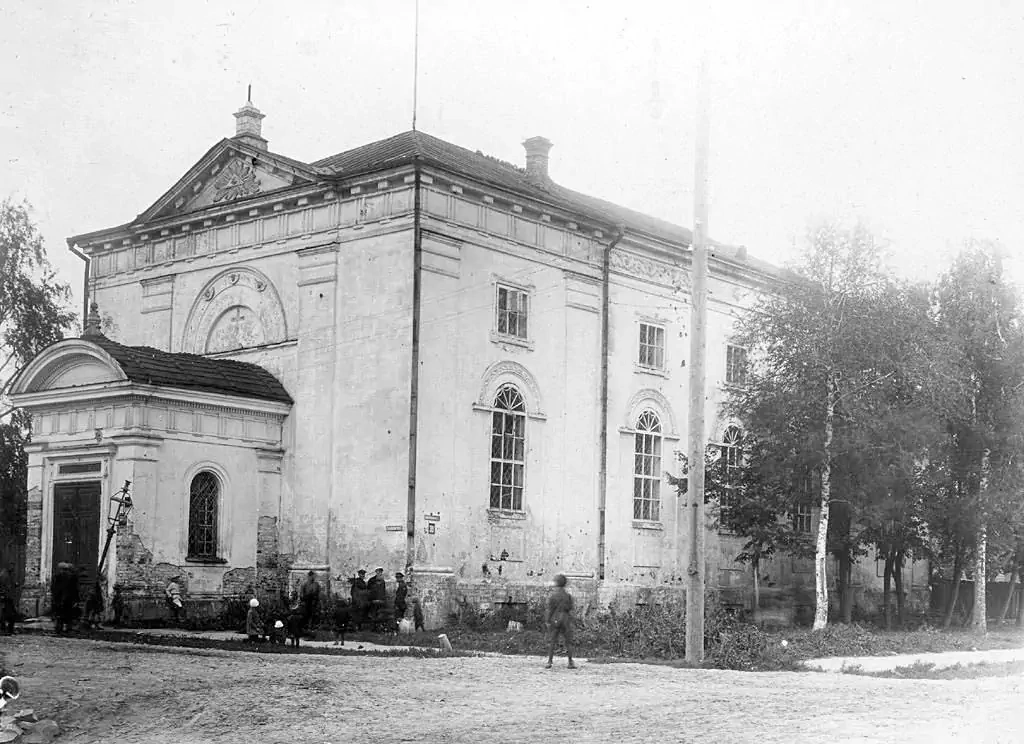
Photograph of the early 20th century

During the First World War in Yaroslavl there were many refugees from Western Russian provinces. Among them were many Lithuanians, Poles, Latvians and Germans. The first two nations received support from the Catholic parish of the Exaltation of the Holy Cross. In turn, the Latvians and Germans were supported by the local Lutheran community.

During this war, many prominent members of the Lutheran community had the goal of providing assistance to the Germans, who at that time found themselves in a difficult situation. In implementing the Russian government's policy of forcibly evicting Germans from the front line and large cities to provincial provinces, international organizations (International Red Cross and Red Crescent Movement, International Peace Bureau) were faced with the task of providing assistance to the German diaspora in the Russian Empire. Yaroslavl province was under the jurisdiction of the US Consulate General in Moscow. As assistants, as a rule, representatives of the German-speaking diaspora were chosen.

In the Yaroslavl Governorate in 1914–1915 this role was performed by the pastor of the congregation, Karl Konigsfeld. Money was transferred to him, and he distributed them among the needy German and Austrian subjects. For example, the Consul General sent "a postal order in the amount of 115 rubles" for nine German citizens who ended up on the territory of the Yaroslavl Governorate. Such events were not isolated. In 1915, in connection with the intensification of the anti-German campaign, the Russian government forbade the transfer of money to German priests. In July 1915, the American Consul wrote to Governor D. N. Tatishchev: "Pastor Koenigsfeldt cannot perform his duties, and I appeal to Your Excellency with a request to inform me who I could find in Yaroslavl as Deputy Pastor Koenigsfeldt to fulfill my instructions". Soon a special committee of eight people was set up to help the German-speaking diaspora. It was headed by the former police chief Dolivo-Dobrovolsky and State Councilor Arsenyev, and since 1917 this function was taken over by the Swedish embassy.

By the time of the revolution, there were about 2,000 members of the Yaroslavl-Kostroma-Vologda district in Yaroslavl (according to the statistics of 1905: 1,000 Estonians, 720 Germans, 660 Latvians), to which the church belonged.

=== After 1917 year ===
In 1922, most of the church utensils and other property of the church were confiscated by the Bolsheviks. In 1934, the Soviet government liquidated the Evangelical Lutheran community of Yaroslavl itself, nationalizing its remaining property.

In the 1930s, the church building was rebuilt – additional ceilings were erected, which is why it became a three-story building. As a result, most of the unique murals and interior decoration were lost. The E.F.Walcker organ was also dismantled and removed from the church building. During the Soviet period, the building was state property.

=== The revival of the kirche and modernity ===
During Perestroika, the Lutherans began to gradually return the building to their control. This process took the beginning of the 1980s and the beginning of the 1990s. Initially, the congregation was located on a small 3-floor lot with an entrance to the back lot of the building, but soon more and more space was occupied by the congregation rather than state institutions.

As an official organization, the Lutheran community in Yaroslavl was registered in 1994.

On 16 May 1999, the Evangelical Lutheran community of the city of Yaroslavl received the church building for use.

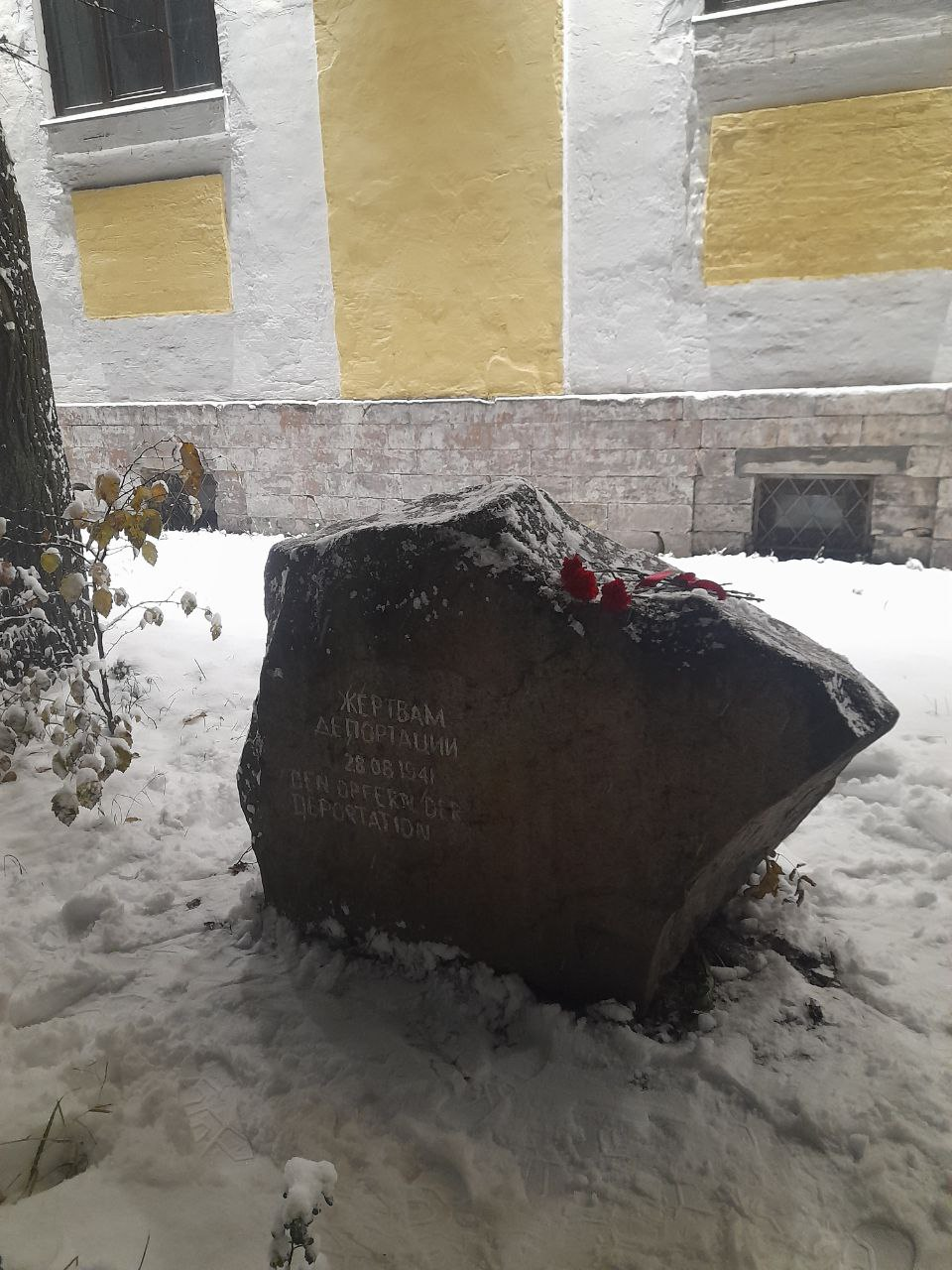
Monument to Volga Germans – victims of deportation

On 2 August 2011, a monument was erected in the courtyard of the church in memory of the deportation of Russian Germans in the USSR during the German-Soviet War. On the memorial stone in Russian and German is engraved: "To the victims of deportation." Lutherans, Russian Germans, representatives of the authorities, Orthodox and Catholic priests came to the opening and consecration of the memorial stone.

On 15 December 2013, after 90 years, a permanent local pastor appeared – Ivan Shirokov. Dietrich Brauer, Bishop of the ELC of the European part of Russia, ordained him to serve.

In 2013–2015, a complex of complex engineering works was carried out, which resulted in the possibility of holding services in the main hall. It is planned to install a heating system.

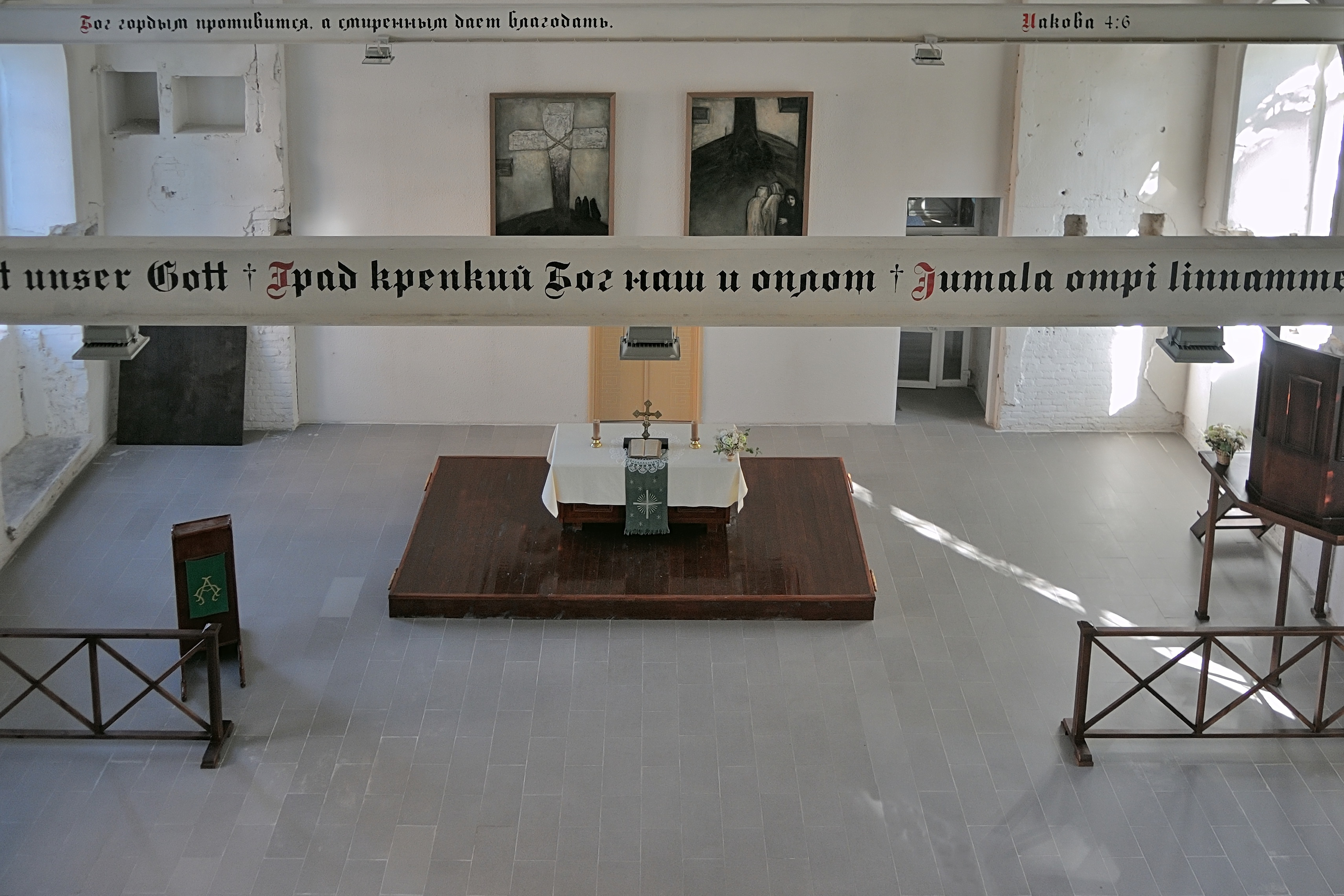
Quotes from scripture in the interior

Significant assistance in the restoration of the church was provided by Lutheran organizations and societies, including those from Kassel. One such organization, the Kassel Society for Promoting the Revival of the Church Building of the Lutheran Community of Yaroslavl, donated a total of 230,000 euros. One of the founders of this organization was the theologian Christian Zippert. The Gustav Adolf Foundation donated 3,000 euros. As part of a partnership between the cities of Yaroslavl and Kassel, the church received pastor Martin Schweitzer through the Evangelical Church of Kurgessen-Waldeck, who, from the time of its new creation, worked on its restoration for 11 years from 1995 to 2006.

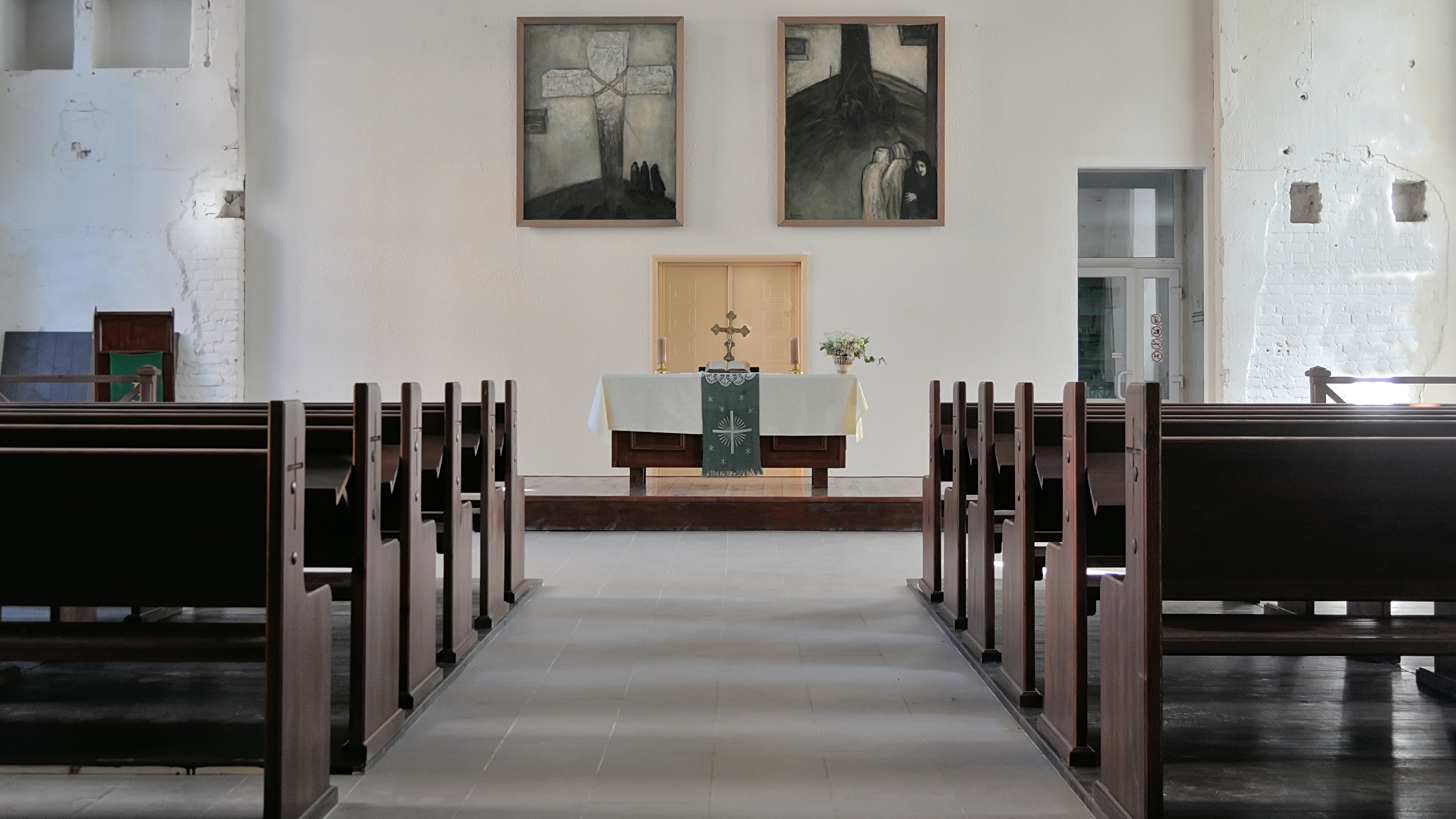
Church interior

On 25 March 2015, the local news program Vesti reported that due to lack of money in the city's budget, a Communist MP suggested selling the Lutheran church. The offer to sell was also linked to the accusation that the church was in poor condition and that no positive development was taking place in it.

On 7 June 2016, an official delegation from the state of Hesse, Germany, visited the church. The head of the delegation was Lucia Puttrich, Minister of State for European and German Affairs, authorized representative of the state of Hesse in the German federal government. The delegation also included deputies of the Landtag of Hesse.

On 15 March 2018, pastor Agris Pilsums, who ministers in the Lutheran communities of Ilukste, Subate, Lashi in Latvia, arrived by car in Yaroslavl and brought for the congregation a diptych "The Ninth Hour" ("Devītā stunda"), written by his wife, Master of Arts Daiga Pilsume. The diptych became an altarpiece in the church. The paintings depict stories of the Passion of Christ.

The Lutheran community finally regained the church only on 19 December 2018, after a decision was made by a meeting of the municipality of Yaroslavl.

In 2023, the city authorities decided to highlight 58 architectural objects, including the church. On 25 July 2023, the building was illuminated.

== Culture ==
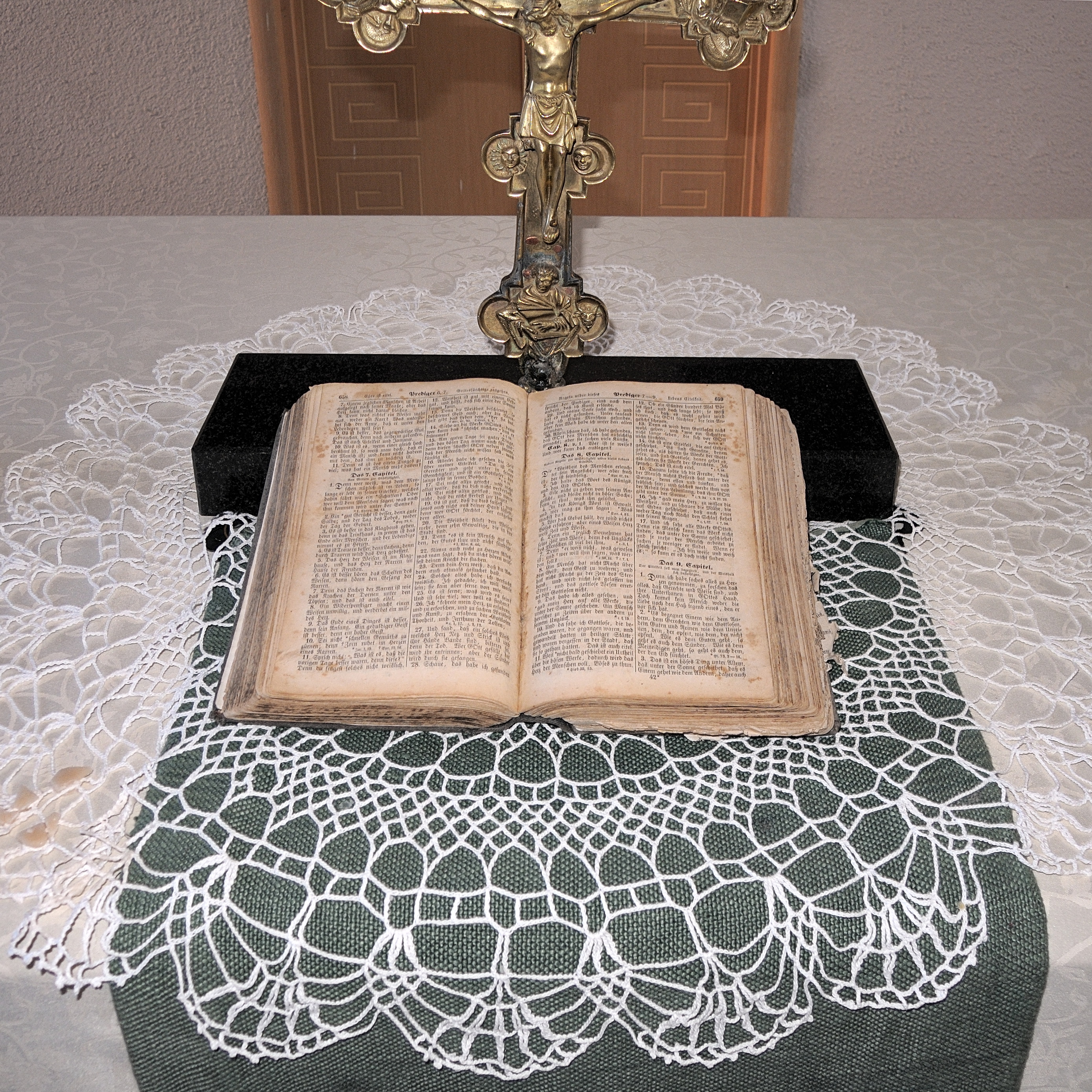
Bible in German in the interior

The Kirche is an important cultural space for the German community of the city, region and neighboring regions.

There is a cooperation with the Lutheran community from Kostroma. It is important because there is no church in the city, there is only a chapel. Concerts are held by the vocal and dance ensemble "Wandervogel" of the Kostroma Association of Germans, which performs traditional German songs and dances. The local German autonomy of Yaroslavl also cooperates with the church, holding various events, including concerts.

== Architecture ==
The building of the church is an example of a Lutheran church of the 19th century in the style of classicism. After the restoration of the main hall, its capacity is about 150 people.

== Organ ==
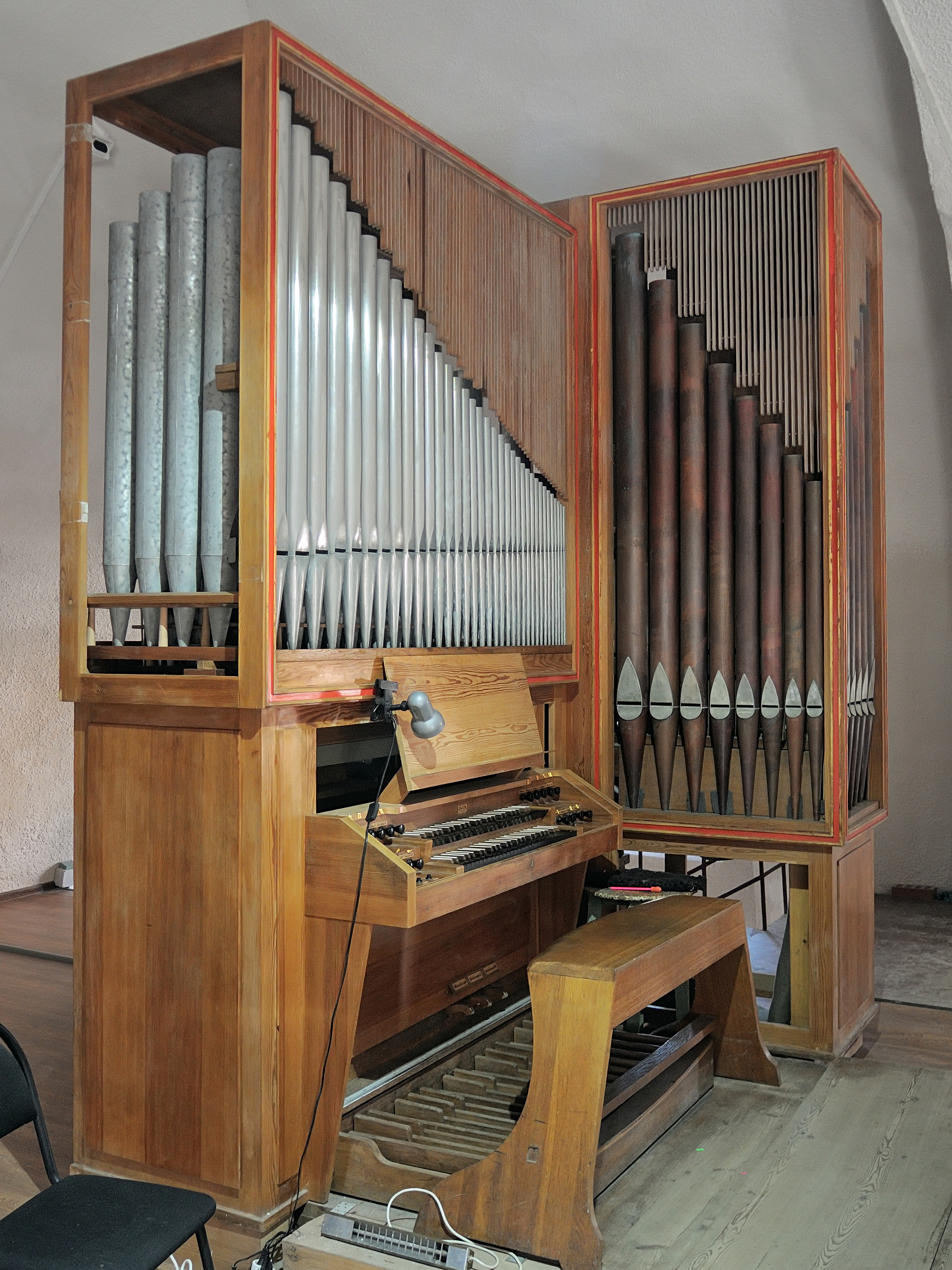
The pipe organ in church

In 2001, the Emmaus Church from Kassel-Brasselsberg donated an organ to the Yaroslavl Lutheran community. But due to the dilapidated condition of the building, it was impossible to install the instrument in it. The condition for obtaining the organ was the restoration of the church, which was subsequently carried out. In July 2015, the organ was installed in the church. It was manufactured by Paul-Ott Goettingen in 1958. The organ has 16 registers and 1060 pipes. On 4 October 2015, he was solemnly consecrated.

The organ was built in the post-war period, and organ builders were not always able to use the necessary materials for construction. Windlad valves are covered with synthetic materials, and not at all with natural leather, as required. Register gate valves – loops – are made of cardboard.

The organ has 16 registers and mechanical playing and register tractures.

== Personalities ==
=== Pastors ===
- 1863—1872 – Oskar Fromhold Mirsalis (27 February 1838, Dorpat — 29 April 1890, Riga) — was ordained to serve in the community on 16 June 1863. In Yaroslavl he lived in a service apartment for the maintenance of which there was a special cash desk in the amount of 400 rubles. From 1863 to 1873, in addition to serving in the community, he was a garrison preacher, after 1873 he continued his ministry in Smolensk.
- 1872—1890 – Israel-Bek Dolukhanyants (8 December 1840 — ?) — during his ministry in the community, the Pastor's House was built (1875–1876), which has not survived to this day. It was located next to the church on the modern Tchaikovsky Street on the site of the Regional Dental Clinic.
- 1888—1923 – Leonard Karl Gottfried Konigsfeld (2 March 1862, Dorpat — 1 December 1945, Potsdam) —studied theology in Dorpat, was assistant to the chief pastor of the Cathedral of Saints Peter and Paul in Moscow. He was a teacher at the Yaroslavl Cadet Corps. Until 1923 he served as a pastor in the church district of Yaroslavl-Kostroma-Vologda, in 1923 he emigrated to the Weimar Republic.
- 1994—2005 – Martin Schweitzer (? — 31 May 2008, Kassel) – became the first pastor of the church after its reopening.
- 2013 – 2023 – Ivan Vyacheslavovich Shirokov – graduated from the Volgograd State Pedagogical University with a degree in biology and chemistry teacher and in the same year entered the theological seminary of the Evangelical Lutheran Church in Novosaratovka, which he successfully graduated in 2012 and was sent by the leadership of the Lutheran church to the Yaroslavl.

=== Organists ===
- 2015 – 2018 – Sergey Konovalov – the first organist in the church after the installation of a new organ. Graduated from the Nizhny Novgorod State Conservatory. He mastered playing the organ in Kassel
- 2018–present – Svetlana Razryadova – graduated from the N.G. Zhiganov Kazan State Conservatory in the class of Professor Abdullin Rubin Kabirovich, before serving in Yaroslavl she was an organist of the Lutheran Church in Kazan. She is also a part-time preacher in the church.

== Gallery ==
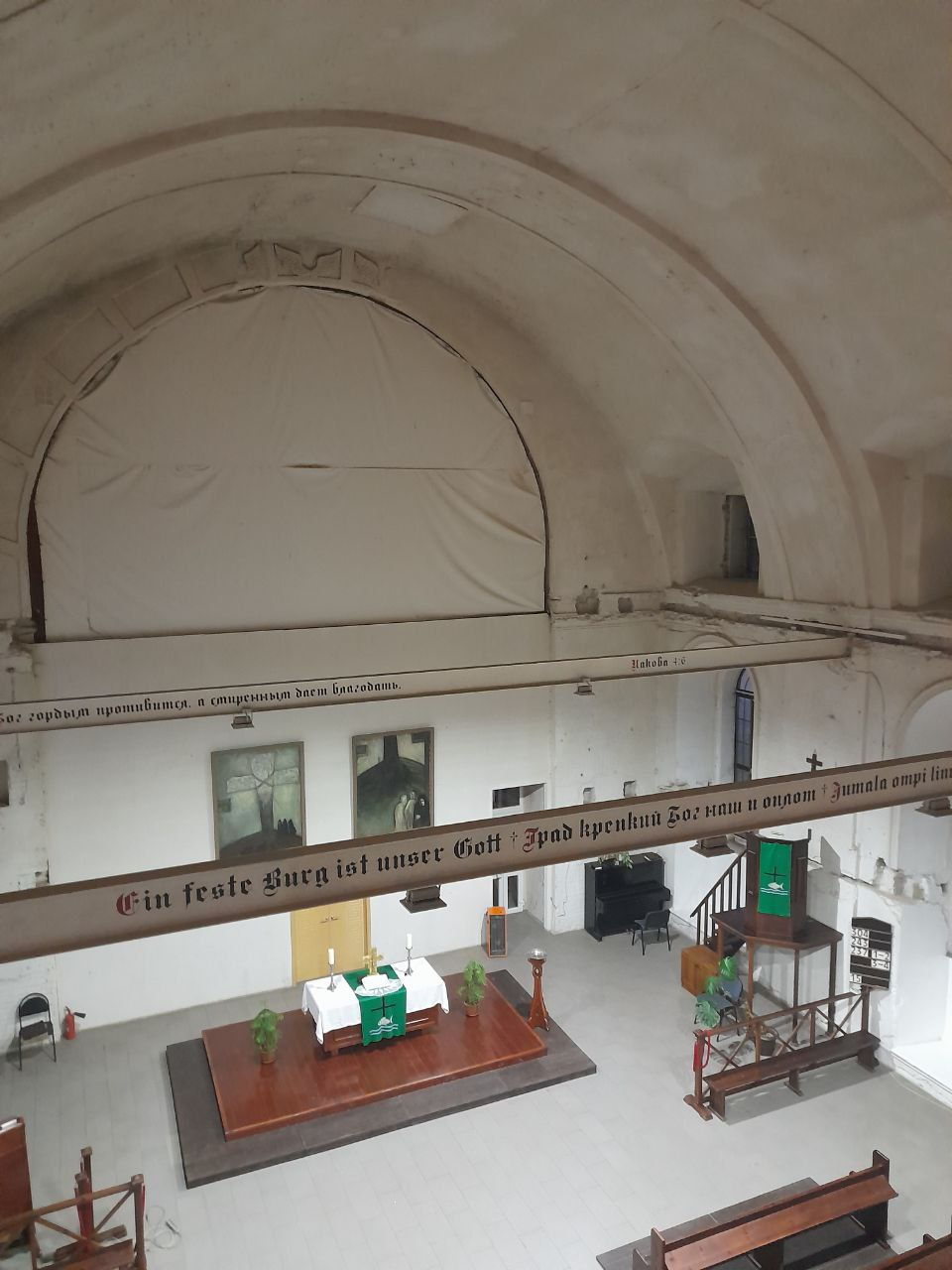
View of the hall of the church from the second floor

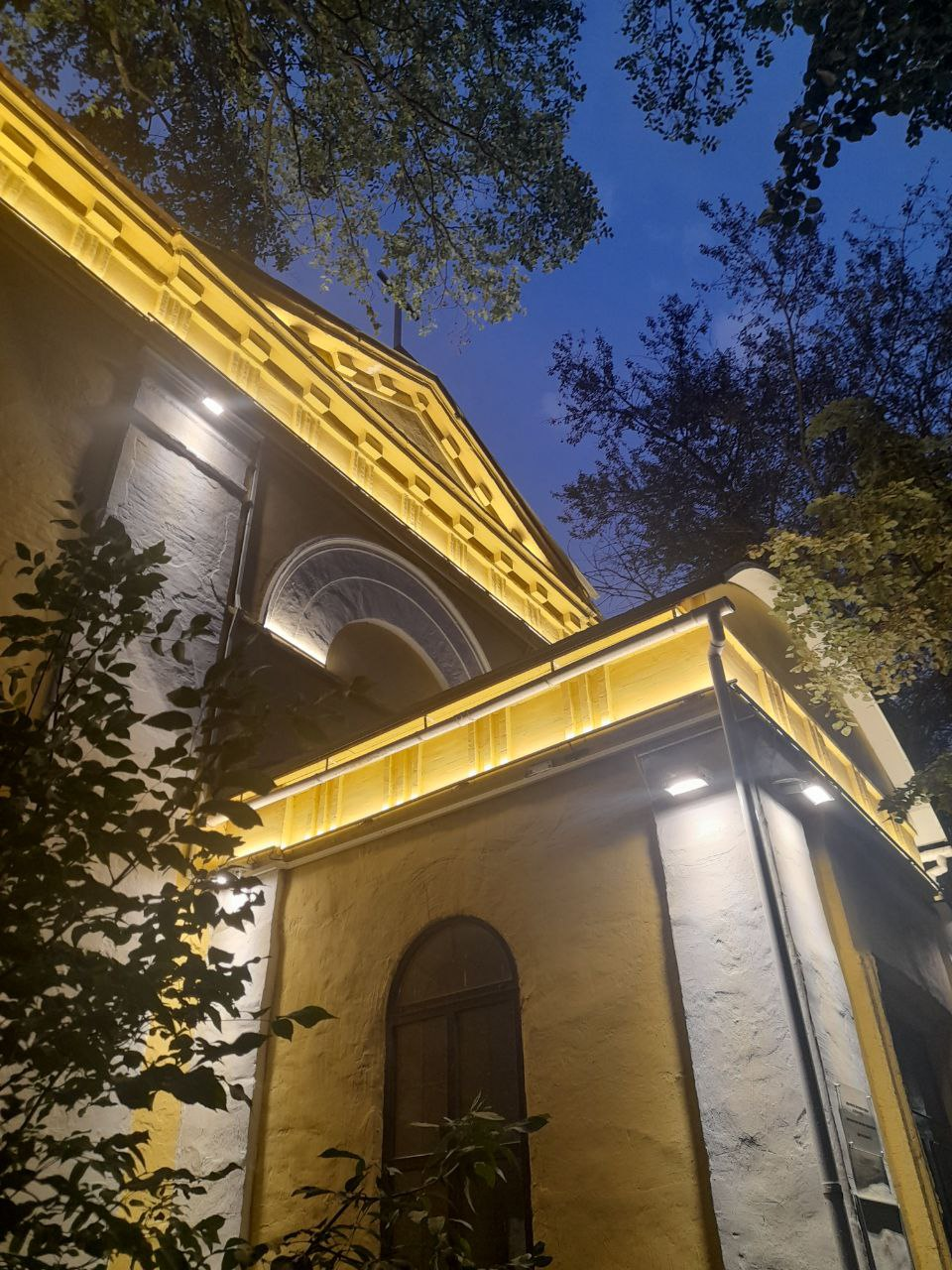
Kirche in the evening

== Sources ==
- Сапрыкина Н. С. Замыслы и реализации, исторические факты. Очерки об архитектуре Ярославля : [монография]. — Ярославль : Изд-во ЯГТУ, 2009. — С. 105–106, 114–128: ил., фот., фот. цв.
