= Molau =

- Ortsteil of Molauer Land
- Interactive map of Molau
- Location within Germany Location within Saxony-Anhalt
- Coordinates: 51°03′N 11°47′E
- Country: Germany
- State: Saxony-Anhalt
- District: Burgenlandkreis
- Municipality: Molauer Land

Area
  - Total: 13.39 km^{2} (5.17 sq mi)
- Elevation: 263 m (863 ft)

Population (2006-12-31)
  - Total: 551
  - Density: 41.2/km^{2} (107/sq mi)
- Time zone: UTC+01:00 (CET)
  - Summer (DST): UTC+02:00 (CEST)
- Postal codes: 06618
- Dialling codes: 036694

Molau is a village and a former municipality in the Burgenlandkreis district, in Saxony-Anhalt, Germany.

Since 1 January 2010, it is part of the municipality Molauer Land.
