= Molauer Land =

- Municipality
- Location of Molauer Land within Burgenlandkreis district
- Interactive map of Molauer Land
- Location within Germany Location within Saxony-Anhalt
- Coordinates: 51°4′N 11°52′E
- Country: Germany
- State: Saxony-Anhalt
- District: Burgenlandkreis
- Municipal assoc.: Wethautal
- Subdivisions: 2

Government
  - Mayor (2023–30): Bodo Zier

Area
  - Total: 33.94 km^{2} (13.10 sq mi)
- Elevation: 220 m (720 ft)

Population (2025-12-31)
  - Total: 939
  - Density: 27.7/km^{2} (71.7/sq mi)
- Time zone: UTC+01:00 (CET)
  - Summer (DST): UTC+02:00 (CEST)
- Postal codes: 06618
- Dialling codes: 036694
- Vehicle registration: BLK
- Website: www.vgem-wethautal.de

Molauer Land is a municipality in the Burgenlandkreis district, in Saxony-Anhalt, Germany. It was formed on 1 January 2010 by the merger of the former municipalities Abtlöbnitz, Casekirchen, Leislau and Molau.
