= Ernst Zimmermann =

Ernst Christoph Philipp Zimmermann (18 September 1786 in Darmstadt – 24 June 1832 in Darmstadt) was a German classical philologist and theologian. He was the brother of theologian Karl Zimmermann (1803–1877).

He studied at the Darmstadt gymnasium as a pupil of historian Helfrich Bernhard Wenck, and afterwards furthered his education at the University of Giessen (1803–05). In 1805 he became a clergyman in the community of Auerbach (today a district of Bensheim), then in 1809 was named deacon in Gross-Gerau and pastor in nearby Büttelborn. In 1814 he was appointed court deacon at the Hofkirche in Darmstadt, where two years later he became a court preacher. In 1831 he attained the titles of prelate, ecclesiastical superintendent and Oberkonsistorialrat (chief consistorial councilor).

He was founder of the publications Allgemeine Kirchenzeitung (since 1822) and Allgemeine Schul-Zeitung (since 1824). A collection of his sermons at the Hofkirche in Darmstadt was published in eight volumes (1816–30).

== Selected works ==
- Euripidis Dramata (edition of Euripides); 4 volumes, 1808–15.
- Eusebii Pamphili Ecclesiasticae Historiae Libri Decem, 1822 part of series: Corpus Patrum Graecorum (on Eusebius' ecclesiastical history, Book X).
- Predigten über sämmtliche Sonn- und Festtags-Evangelien des Jahres (2 volumes, 1825–27).
- Geist aus Luther's Schriften oder Concordanz der Ansichten und Urtheile des großen Reformators über die wichtigsten Gegenstände des Glaubens, der Wissenschaft und des Lebens (as co-editor) – Spirit of Martin Luther's writings or concordance on the views and judgments of the great reformer involving the most important articles of faith, science and life.
- Stimmen aus dem Reiche Gottes an und für die bewegte Zeit, 1831.
- Jahrbuch der theologischen Literatur, since 1832 (editor) – Yearbook of theological literature.
