= Edward Valentine Blomfield =

English classical scholar

Edward Valentine Blomfield (14 February 1788 – 9 October 1816) was an English classical scholar and brother of Bishop Charles James Blomfield.

== Life ==
Blomfield was born at Bury St Edmunds, the second son of the six children of Charles Blomfield (1763–1831), a schoolmaster (as was E. V. Blomfield's grandfather, James Blomfield), JP and chief alderman of Bury St Edmunds, and his wife, Hester (1765–1844), daughter of Edward Pawsey, a Bury grocer.

Edward acquired a high reputation for learning and general accomplishments, being a good modern linguist and draughtsman, as well as a brilliant scholar He was educated under Dr. Becher at the grammar school at Bury St Edmunds, and thence proceeded to Gonville and Caius College, Cambridge, in 1807.

In 1811, he took his B.A. degree, being placed thirteenth wrangler. He had, however, obtained such classical distinctions as were then open to competition; he was Browne medallist in 1809 and 1810 (in the former year being beaten by one candidate, but receiving a prize of books from the vice-chancellor, Dr. Barnes), members' prizeman in 1812, and finally first chancellor's classical medallist

The fellowships in his own college being full, he was elected to a classical lectureship and fellowship at Emmanuel College, which he retained till his death in 1816. He died from a fever contracted in a long vacation tour in Switzerland in that year. He managed, after being taken ill at Dover, to reach Cambridge, where he died on 3 Oct., and was buried in Emmanuel College Chapel; in the cloisters of which is a tablet to his memory, with an inscription by his brother, Charles James.

In 1813, he travelled to Germany and made the acquaintance of some of the great scholars of that country. On his return, he published in the Museum Criticum (No. ii), an interesting paper on "The Present State of Classical Literature in Germany." He died in 1816, his early death depriving Cambridge of one who seemed destined to take a high place amongst her most brilliant classical scholars.

== Work ==
His chief work was a translation of Matthiae's Greek Grammar, a book still unrivalled in its way. He had completed it in the spring of 1816, intending to furnish it with indexes, &c., in the autumn. It was left for his brother Charles James to edit, who prefixed to it a short essay on the virtues and learning of the translator. Edward had met with this book in the course of a tour in Germany, undertaken in 1813, as soon as the events of that year had opened the continent to English travellers. Another fruit of this tour was a paper in the Museum Criticum on "The State of Classical Literature in Germany," a subject which had then become almost unknown in England. Besides a few other papers contributed to the ' Museum ' Blomfield had projected a Greek-English lexicon to take the place of the old Greek-Latin Lexicons of Scapula and Hedericus, which gave needless difficulty to students and were neither full nor accurate. He published a specimen of his Lexicon, which was well received, and his plans seem to have been rational and promising.

== Sources ==
- This article incorporates text from a publication now in the public domain: Shuckburgh, Evelyn Shirley (1886). "Blomfield, Edward Valentine". In Stephen, Leslie (ed.). Dictionary of National Biography. Vol. 05. London: Smith, Elder & Co. pp. 30–231.
- Chisholm, Hugh, ed. (1911). "Blomfield, Edward Valentine" . Encyclopædia Britannica (11th ed.). Cambridge University Press.
- James Henry Monk, "Memoir of Edward Valentine Blomfield," in Museum Criticum, No. vii.
