= Casekirchen =

- Ortsteil of Molauer Land
- Interactive map of Casekirchen
- Location within Germany Location within Saxony-Anhalt
- Coordinates: 51°4′N 11°52′E
- Country: Germany
- State: Saxony-Anhalt
- District: Burgenlandkreis
- Municipality: Molauer Land

Area
  - Total: 8.83 km^{2} (3.41 sq mi)
- Elevation: 220 m (720 ft)

Population (2006-12-31)
  - Total: 273
  - Density: 30.9/km^{2} (80.1/sq mi)
- Time zone: UTC+01:00 (CET)
  - Summer (DST): UTC+02:00 (CEST)
- Postal codes: 06618
- Dialling codes: 036694
- Website: www.casekirchen.eu

Casekirchen is a village and a former municipality in the Burgenlandkreis district, in Saxony-Anhalt, Germany.

Since 1 January 2010 it has been part of the municipality Molauer Land.
