= Abtlöbnitz =

- Ortsteil of Molauer Land
- Interactive map of Abtlöbnitz
- Location within Germany Location within Saxony-Anhalt
- Coordinates: 51°5′N 11°43′E
- Country: Germany
- State: Saxony-Anhalt
- District: Burgenlandkreis
- Municipality: Molauer Land

Area
  - Total: 4.26 km^{2} (1.64 sq mi)
- Elevation: 249 m (817 ft)

Population (2006-12-31)
  - Total: 153
  - Density: 35.9/km^{2} (93.0/sq mi)
- Time zone: UTC+01:00 (CET)
  - Summer (DST): UTC+02:00 (CEST)
- Postal codes: 06628
- Dialling codes: 034466
- Vehicle registration: BLK

Abtlöbnitz is a village and a former municipality in the Burgenlandkreis district, in Saxony-Anhalt, Germany.

Since 1 January 2010, it is part of the municipality Molauer Land.
