= Carl Zimmerman (producer) =

American producer and talent agent (born 1939)

- Born: November 15, 1939 (age 86); Brooklyn, New York, United States
- Occupation: Producer

Carl Zimmerman (born November 15, 1939) is an American theatre producer and talent agent. He is a current advisor and project scout for leading television and cable networks, mainly HBO and CBS.

== Early life ==
Zimmerman was born in Brooklyn, the son of Esther Schwartz, a school teacher, and Julius Zimmerman, a talent agent. At age 17 he went to work for his father as an assistant before opening his own agency in 1961.

== Career ==
Zimmerman was known for representing clients such as Academy Award winners Spencer Tracy, Bette Davis, Gene Kelly, Paul Muni, and Claudette Colbert. In an interview with The Washington Post, Zimmerman stated, "The entertainment industry is one of the greatest in the world, it has given me my life and education, I have always worshiped and adored talent, it's been a huge privilege".

Zimmerman became a theater producer in 1960 while still working as an agent. Zimmerman began producing smaller-scale theatre before creating the acclaimed Oscar Wilde Trilogy for a national tour of the United States. It was the first of its kind to reach capacity in the box office.

In the summer of 1972 Zimmerman launched Shakespeare's Loves, beginning a successful, large-scale tour of Shakespearean plays in classic repertory style. Afterwards, in 1975, he took the tour to Australia. After producing large-scale productions around the world for 13 years, Zimmerman returned to being a full-time agent while working as a co-producer on Broadway. He produced some classics such as The Seagull, The Cherry Orchard, and The Bear, all of which won the Critics' Drama Desk Award.

Zimmerman is a recipient of a number of international prizes for his work and dedication to theater, film, and the television industry. In 2008 he received the Lifetime Merit Award at Radio City Music Hall.
