= August Heinrich Matthiae =

- Born: 25 December 1769; Göttingen, Lower Saxony, Germany
- Died: 6 January 1835 (aged 65)
- Occupation: Classical scholar

Academic background
- Education: University of Göttingen

August Heinrich Matthiae (25 December 1769 – 6 January 1835) was a German classical scholar.

== Biography ==
He was born at Göttingen, and educated at the university. He then spent some years as a tutor in Amsterdam. In 1798 he returned to the Holy Roman Empire, and in 1802 was appointed director of the Friedrichsgymnasium at Altenburg, which post he held till his death. His biography was written by his son Constantin, with the title A. Matthiä in seinem Leben und Wirken, etc. (1845).

== Works ==
Of his numerous important works the best-known are:

- A copious Greek grammar, translated into English by V Blomfield, edited by John Kenrick (1832).
- an edition of Euripides (9 vols., 1813–1829)
- Grundriss der Geschichte der griechischen und römischen Litteratur (3rd ed., 1834, Eng. trans., Oxford, 1841)
- Lehrbuch fur den ersten Unterricht in der Philosophie (3rd ed., 1833)
- Encyklopädie und Methodologie der Philologie (1835)

== Family ==
His brother, Friedrich Christian Matthiae (1763–1822), rector of the Frankfurt gymnasium, published editions of Seneca's Letters, Aratus, and Dionysius Periegetes.
