= Leislau =

- Ortsteil of Molauer Land
- Interactive map of Leislau
- Location within Germany Location within Saxony-Anhalt
- Coordinates: 51°5′N 11°45′E
- Country: Germany
- State: Saxony-Anhalt
- District: Burgenlandkreis
- Municipality: Molauer Land

Area
  - Total: 7.46 km^{2} (2.88 sq mi)
- Elevation: 269 m (883 ft)

Population (2006-12-31)
  - Total: 264
  - Density: 35.4/km^{2} (91.7/sq mi)
- Time zone: UTC+01:00 (CET)
  - Summer (DST): UTC+02:00 (CEST)
- Postal codes: 06618
- Dialling codes: 036421

Leislau is a village and a former municipality in the Burgenlandkreis district, in Saxony-Anhalt, Germany.

Since 1 January 2010, it is part of the municipality Molauer Land.
