= Karl Zimmermann (theologian) =

German Protestant theologian

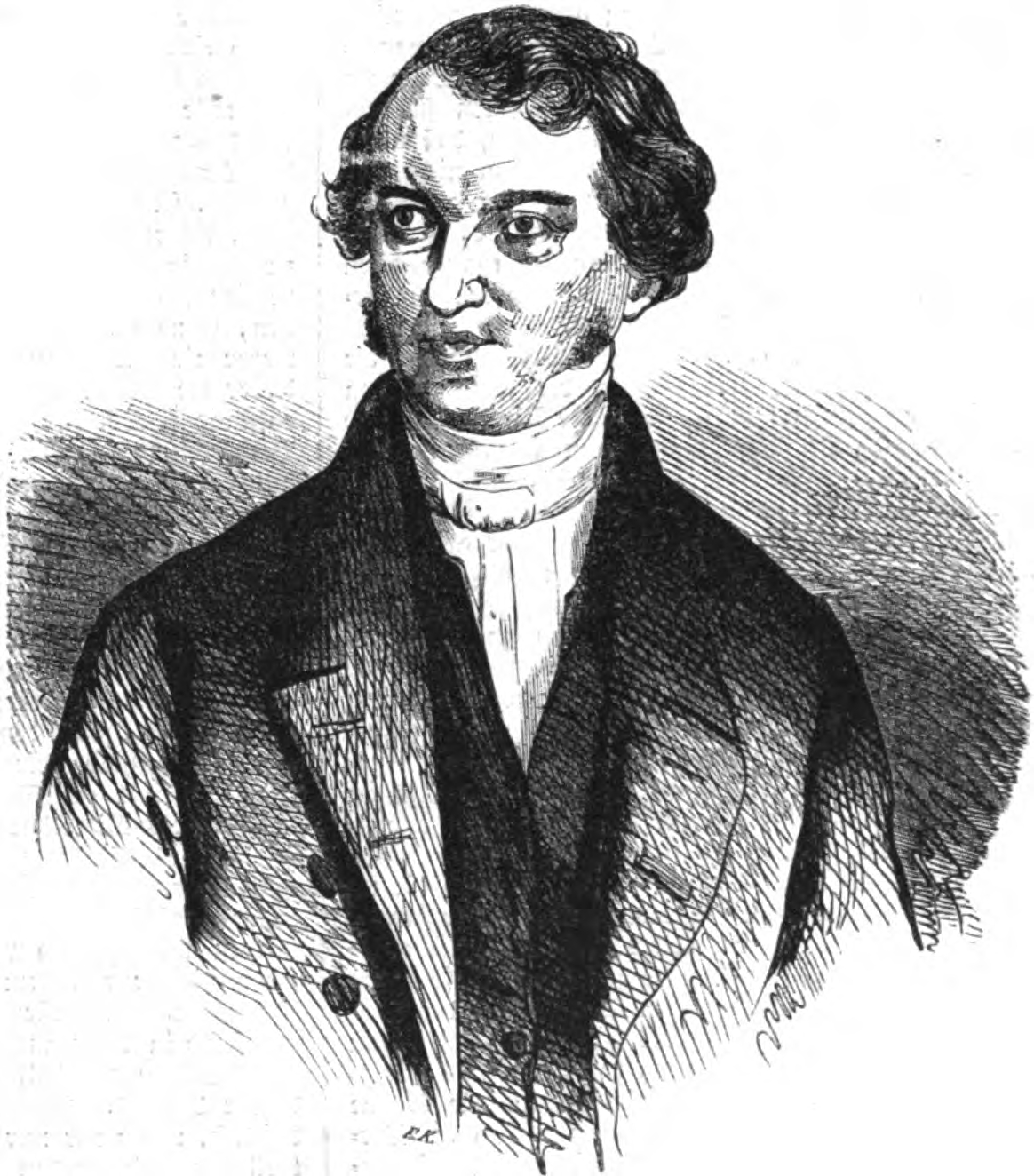
Karl Zimmermann

Justus Joseph Georg Friedrich Karl Zimmermann (23 August 1803 – 12 June 1877) was a German Protestant theologian. His older brother, Ernst Zimmermann (1786–1832), was also a theologian.

Born in the Hessian city of Darmstadt, He studied philology and theology at the universities of Giessen and Heidelberg, and for several years worked as a teacher in various schools. In 1835 he was named second court chaplain in Darmstadt, then obtained the title of first court chaplain in 1842. From 1847 onward, he served as a member of the consistory, a prelate and ecclesiastical superintendent at the Schlosskirche in Darmstadt.

He was a catalyst towards the development and promotion of the Gustav-Adolf-Verein, a society that is presently known as the "Gustav-Adolf-Werk". It is responsible for taking care of "diaspora duties" of the Evangelical Church in Germany (EKD).

Zimmermann died in Darmstadt at the age of 73.

== Selected works ==
- Aufruf an die protestantische Welt (1841) – Appeal to the Protestant world.
- Beiträge zur vergleichenden Homiletik Predigten an Gustav-Adolfs-Festen nach Text, Thema und Disposition (1866) – On comparative homiletic sermons at Gustav Adolfs festivals, etc.
- Die christliche Toleranz (1868) – Christian tolerance.
