= Janisroda =

- Stadtteil of Naumburg
- Interactive map of Janisroda
- Location within Germany Location within Saxony-Anhalt
- Coordinates: 51°7′N 11°47′E
- Country: Germany
- State: Saxony-Anhalt
- District: Burgenlandkreis
- Town: Naumburg

Area
  - Total: 3.81 km^{2} (1.47 sq mi)
- Elevation: 269 m (883 ft)

Population (2006-12-31)
  - Total: 212
  - Density: 55.6/km^{2} (144/sq mi)
- Time zone: UTC+01:00 (CET)
  - Summer (DST): UTC+02:00 (CEST)
- Postal codes: 06618
- Dialling codes: 034466

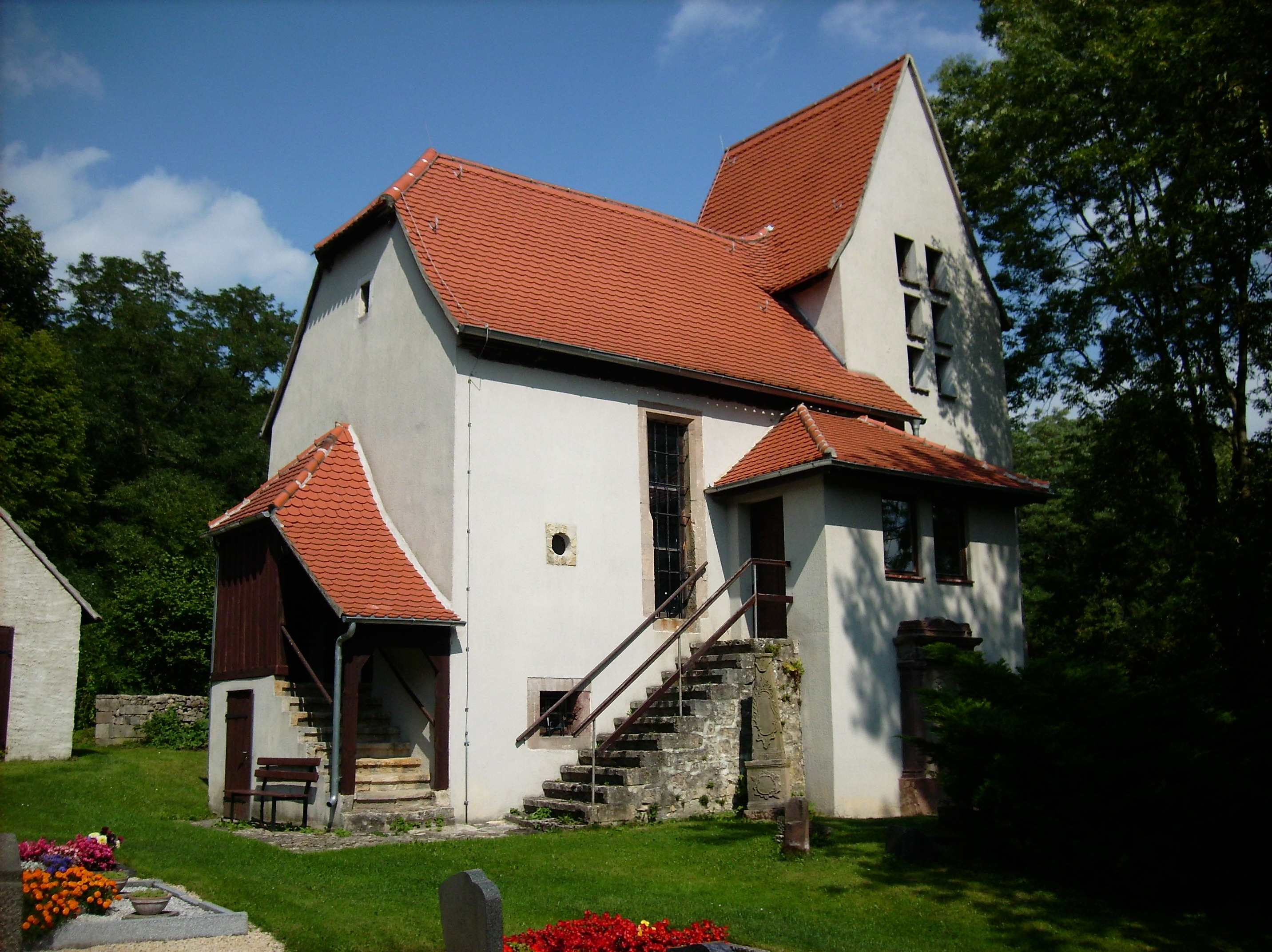
Church of the village of Janisroda (Naumburg, district of Burgenlandkreis, Saxony-Anhalt)

Janisroda (German pronunciation: [jaːnɪsˈʁoːda]) is a village and a former municipality in the Burgenlandkreis district, in Saxony-Anhalt, Germany. Since 1 January 2010, it is part of the town Naumburg.

== Geography ==
Janisroda is located between Jena and Naumburg (Saale). In this area, the Zeitzer-Altenburger Loess Hills begin, which are an extension of the Leipzig Bay. The neighboring village is Neujanisroda.
