= Crölpa-Löbschütz =

- Stadtteil of Naumburg
- Interactive map of Crölpa-Löbschütz
- Location within Germany Location within Saxony-Anhalt
- Coordinates: 51°6′N 11°44′E
- Country: Germany
- State: Saxony-Anhalt
- District: Burgenlandkreis
- Town: Naumburg

Area
  - Total: 7.82 km^{2} (3.02 sq mi)
- Elevation: 269 m (883 ft)

Population (2006-12-31)
  - Total: 546
  - Density: 69.8/km^{2} (181/sq mi)
- Time zone: UTC+01:00 (CET)
  - Summer (DST): UTC+02:00 (CEST)
- Postal codes: 06628
- Dialling codes: 034466

Crölpa-Löbschütz (German pronunciation: [ˈkʁœlpa ˈløːpʃʏts]) is a village and a former municipality in the Burgenlandkreis district, in Saxony-Anhalt, Germany.

Since 1 January 2010, it is part of the town Naumburg.
