= Prießnitz =

- Stadtteil of Naumburg
- Interactive map of Prießnitz
- Location within Germany Location within Saxony-Anhalt
- Coordinates: 51°6′N 11°47′E
- Country: Germany
- State: Saxony-Anhalt
- District: Burgenlandkreis
- Town: Naumburg

Area
  - Total: 6.49 km^{2} (2.51 sq mi)
- Elevation: 239 m (784 ft)

Population (2016-12-31)
  - Total: 305
  - Density: 47.0/km^{2} (122/sq mi)
- Time zone: UTC+01:00 (CET)
  - Summer (DST): UTC+02:00 (CEST)
- Postal codes: 06618
- Dialling codes: 034466

Prießnitz (German pronunciation: [ˈpʁiːsnɪts]) is a village and a former municipality in the Burgenlandkreis district, in Saxony-Anhalt, Germany. Since 1 January 2010, it is part of the town Naumburg.
