= Dörflinger =

Dörflinger is a surname. Notable people with the surname include:

- Stefan Dörflinger (born 1948), Swiss Grand Prix motorcycle road racer
- Thomas Dörflinger (born 1965), German politician
- Werner Dörflinger (1940–2021), German politician
