= Michael F. Feldkamp =

German historian and journalist (born 1962)

Michael F. Feldkamp (born 23 April 1962) is a German historian and journalist.

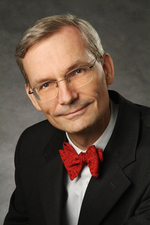
Michael F. Feldkamp in 2010

== Career ==
Feldkamp was born in Kiel. After completing his high school studies at the Gymnasium Carolinum in Osnabrück, he studied history, Catholic theology, teaching, and philosophy at the University of Bonn. During the academic year 1985–86 he studied Church history at the Gregorian University in Rome. He concluded his studies with the German state examination in 1990. In 1986, and again in 1990-1991, he received fellowships from the German Historical Institute in Rome. The University of Bonn awarded him the Dr. phil. degree in 1992. From 1993 to 1995 he was on the staff of the archives of the German Bundestag (Parliament). From 1996 to 1997 he worked in the Bonn antenna for the Institute for Contemporary History in Munich. In 2000 he was given a permanent civil service appointment in the administration of the Bundestag.

Feldkamp is a member of the Roman Catholic fraternity Katholischer Studentenverein Arminia Bonn and the Katholischer Studentenverein Askania-Burgundia Berlin, the two founder fraternities of the Kartellverband katholischer deutscher Studentenvereine. Feldkamp's research is wide-ranging. In addition to numerous articles about the history of the diocese and province of Osnabrück, he has studied papal diplomacy and the Cologne nuntiature, and written about university history and the history of scholarship. He is best known outside Germany for his writings about the role of Pope Pius XII during the Third Reich. So he has critically analysed "Hitler's Pope" by John Cornwell and A Moral Reckoning by Daniel Goldhagen. Within Germany, he has achieved recognition for his studies of the German "Basic Law" (Constitution) and the history of the Bundestag. In 2012, the German publisher Wolfram Weimer counted Feldkamp to the 800 most important representatives of modern Catholicism in Germany due to his scientific and journalistic commitment. Feldkamp became a member of the papal order of St. Gregory the Great in July 2021 with the office of commander. The honor was awarded in the apostolic nunciature in Berlin.

In January 2022, Feldkamp presented in the Vatican his latest research on Pius XII in relation to the Holocaust, thereby contradicting with evidence what John Cornwell wrote in his book "Pius XII - The Pope Who Remained Silent" and claiming that Pope Pius XII saved more than 15,000 Jews from extermination.

== Honours ==
- 2009: Knight of the Order of the Holy Sepulchre.
- 2011: Commander of commandry/Local Delegate of the Order of the Holy Sepulchre in Berlin.
- 2015: Honorary member of the Real Academia Sancti Ambrosii Martyris (Ferentino/Italy) as well as delegate of this academy in Germany.
- 2015: Knight Commander of the Order of Holy Sepulchre.
- 2017: Grand Cross of the Royal Order of the Lion of Rwanda (Intare).
- 2021: Cross of the papal order of St. Gregory the Great.

== Works available in German ==
- Studien und Texte zur Geschichte der Kölner Nuntiatur, 4 vol., Città del Vaticano 1993, 1995 und 2008 ISBN 88-85042-22-8 - ISBN 88-85042-21-X - ISBN 88-85042-27-9 - ISBN 978-88-85042-51-3
- Der Parlamentarische Rat 1948-1949. Akten und Protokolle, Vol. 8, 10, 11 und 12, Boppard, bzw. München: Oldenbourg 1995-1999.
- Michael F. Feldkamp/Daniel Kosthorst (Ed.): Die Akten zur Auswärtigen Politik der Bundesrepublik Deutschland 1949/50. September 1949 bis Dezember 1950, ed. im Auftrage des Auswärtigen Amts vom Institut für Zeitgeschichte, München 1997.
- Der Parlamentarische Rat 1948-1949, Göttingen 1998.
- Die Entstehung des Grundgesetzes für die Bundesrepublik Deutschland 1949, Stuttgart 1999.
- Die Beziehungen der Bundesrepublik Deutschland zum Heiligen Stuhl 1949-1966. Aus den Vatikanakten des Auswärtigen Amts. Eine Dokumentation. Köln 2000.
- Pius XII. und Deutschland, Göttingen 2000.
- Der Stellvertreter von Rolf Hochhuth in der Innen- und Außenpolitik der Bundesrepublik Deutschland. Mit einem Anhang ausgewählter Aktenstücke aus den Vatikanakten des Auswärtigen Amtes, in: Geschichte im Bistum Aachen – Beiheft 2, 2001/2002: Von Pius XII. bis Johannes XXIII., edit by Geschichtsverein für das Bistum Aachen e.V., Neustadt a.d. Aisch 2001, S. 127-177.
- Leo Just: Briefe an Hermann Cardauns, Paul Fridolin Kehr, Aloys Schulte, Heinrich Finke, Albert Brackmann und Martin Spahn 1923-1944. ed. Michael F. Feldkamp, Frankfurt am Main 2002.
- Regentenlisten und Stammtafeln zur Geschichte Europas. Vom Mittelalter bis zur Gegenwart, Stuttgart 2002, ISBN 3-15-017034-6
- Goldhagens unwillige Kirche. Alte und neue Fälschungen über Kirche und Papst während der NS-Herrschaft, München 2003, ISBN 3-7892-8127-1
- Michael F. Feldkamp unter Mitarbeit von Birgit Ströbel: Datenhandbuch zur Geschichte des Deutschen Bundestages 1994 bis 2003, Baden-Baden 2005, ISBN 3-8329-1395-5
- Kurt Georg Kiesinger und seine Berliner Studentenkorporation Askania auf dem Weg ins "Dritte Reich", in: Günter Buchstab/Philipp Gassert/Peter Thaddäus Lang (Ed.): Kurt Georg Kiesinger 1904-1988. Von Ebingen ins Kanzleramt, ed by Konrad-Adenauer-Stiftung e.V. (= Herder Taschenbuch), Freiburg im Breisgau, Basel, Wien 2005, S. 149-199
- (ed.), Der Bundestagspräsident. Amt - Funktion - Person. 16. Wahlperiode, München 2007 ISBN 978-3-7892-8201-0

== Works available in Italian ==
- La diplomazia pontificia. Da Silvestro I a Giovanni Paolo II., Milano 1998.

== Works available in Spanish ==
- La diplomacia pontificia. Desde papa Silvestre hasta Juan Pablo II (= Biblioteca de Autores Christianos) (= Iglesia y Sociedad: Para una Historia de occidente, vol. 8), Madrid 2004.

== Works available in French ==
- La diplomatie pontificale de Sylvestre Ier à Jean-Paul II. Une vue d'ensemble. Traduit de l'allemand par Henri Cellérier, Préface par Bruno Neveu (= Histoire du Christianisme), Paris 2001.
