= Kurt Georg Kiesinger =

Chancellor of West Germany from 1966 to 1969

- Kiesinger in 1969

Chancellor of Germany (Note: Due to the division of Germany, Kurt Georg Kiesinger was only the Federal Chancellor in West Germany. The term West Germany is only the common English name for the Federal Republic of Germany between its formation on 23 May 1949 and the German reunification through the accession of East Germany on 3 October 1990. The office of Chancellor did not exist in East Germany.)
- In office 1 December 1966 – 22 October 1969
- President: Heinrich Lübke; Gustav Heinemann
- Vice Chancellor: Willy Brandt
- Preceded by: Ludwig Erhard
- Succeeded by: Willy Brandt

Leader of the Christian Democratic Union
- In office 23 May 1967 – 5 October 1971
- General Secretary: Bruno Heck
- Preceded by: Ludwig Erhard
- Succeeded by: Rainer Barzel

Minister-President of Baden-Württemberg
- In office 17 December 1958 – 1 December 1966
- Deputy: Hermann Veit; Wolfgang Haußmann
- Preceded by: Gebhard Müller
- Succeeded by: Hans Filbinger

President of the Bundesrat
- In office 1 November 1962 – 31 October 1963
- First Vice President: Hans Ehard
- Preceded by: Hans Ehard
- Succeeded by: Georg Diederichs

Leader of the CDU/CSU group in the Bundestag
- Acting
- In office 9 May 1973 – 17 May 1973
- First Deputy: Richard Stücklen
- Whips: Leo Wagner; Rudolf Seiters; Wilhelm Rawe; Olaf Baron von Wrangel; Paul Mikat
- Preceded by: Rainer Barzel
- Succeeded by: Karl Carstens
Parliamentary constituencies
Member of the Bundestag; from Baden-Württemberg
In office 20 October 1969 – 4 November 1980
Preceded by	Anton Hilbert
Succeeded by	Multi-member district
Constituency	Waldshut (1969–1976); State list (1976–1980)
In office 7 September 1949 – 19 February 1959
Preceded by	Constituency established
Succeeded by	Wilhelm Adam Lulay
Constituency	Ravensburg
Member of the; Landtag of Baden-Württemberg; for Saulgau
In office 12 March 1961 – 9 December 1966
Preceded by	Christian Rack
Succeeded by	Anton Lutz

Personal details
- Born: 6 April 1904 Ebingen, Württemberg, Germany
- Died: 9 March 1988 (aged 83) Tübingen, Baden-Württemberg, West Germany
- Party: Christian Democratic Union (1946–1988)
- Other political affiliations: Nazi Party (1933–1945)
- Spouse: Marie-Luise Schneider (m. 1932)
- Children: 2
- Occupation: Lawyer
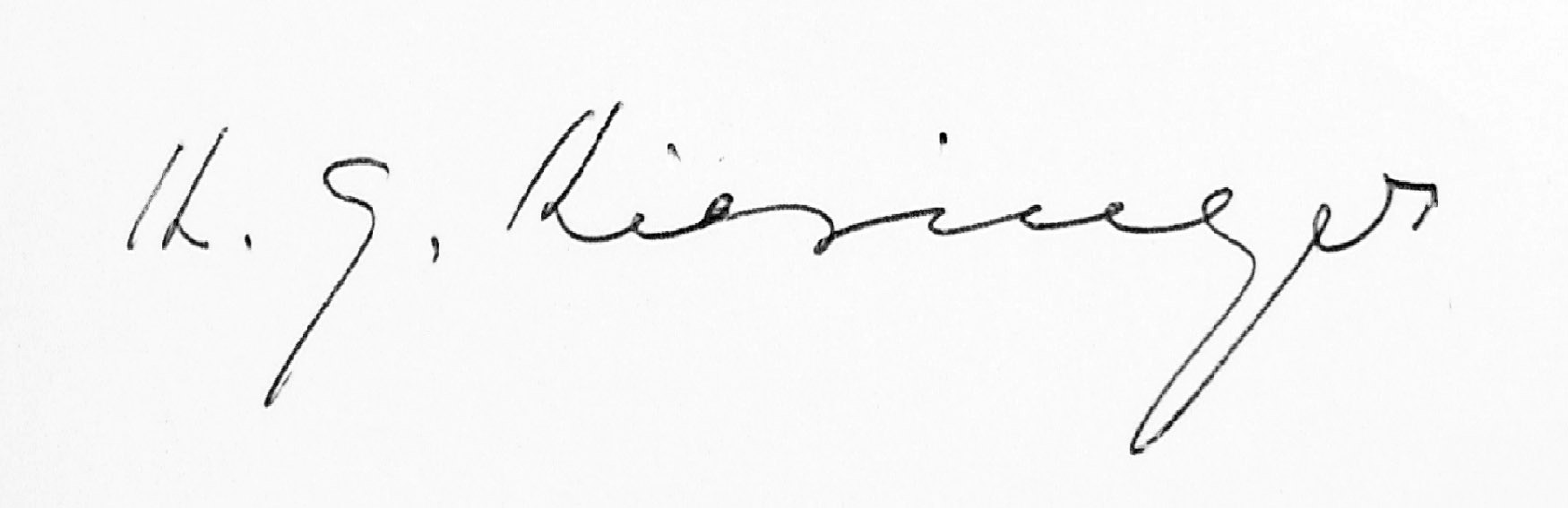
- Signature

Kurt Georg Kiesinger (German: [ˈkʊʁt ˈɡeːɔʁk ˈkiːzɪŋɐ]; 6 April 1904 – 9 March 1988) was a German politician and lawyer who served as the chancellor of West Germany from 1 December 1966 to 21 October 1969. Before he became chancellor, he served as Minister-President of Baden-Württemberg from 1958 to 1966 and as President of the Bundesrat from 1962 to 1963. He was chairman of the Christian Democratic Union (CDU) from 1967 to 1971.

Kiesinger passed his second state examination in October 1934 and worked as a lawyer at Berlin's Kammergericht and a private law teacher (Repetitor) from 1935 to 1940. Having joined the Nazi Party in 1933, he remained a largely inactive member. To avoid conscription, in 1940 a former student of his helped having him appointed to the broadcast policy department of the Foreign Office by Joachim von Ribbentrop, and he became deputy head of the broadcasting and propaganda departments in 1942. In 1946, he became a member of the Christian Democratic Union. He was elected to the Bundestag in 1949, and was a member of the Bundestag until 1958 and again from 1969 to 1980. He left federal politics for eight years (from 1958 to 1966) to serve as Minister-President of Baden-Württemberg, and subsequently became chancellor by forming a grand coalition with Willy Brandt's Social Democratic Party (SPD).

Kiesinger is also considered controversial, mainly due to his affiliation and work with the Nazis. The student movement in particular, but also other sections of the population, saw Kiesinger as a politician who embodied the inadequacy of Germans' coming to terms with the past.

== Early life ==
Kurt Georg Kiesinger was born in Ebingen, Kingdom of Württemberg (now Albstadt, Baden-Württemberg). His father was a commercial clerk in companies engaged in the local textile industry. Kiesinger was baptised Catholic because his mother was Catholic, though his father was Protestant. His mother died six months after he was born. After a year, his father remarried to Karoline Victoria Pfaff. His maternal grandmother exerted a strong influence on Kiesinger and encouraged him, while both his father and his stepmother were indifferent to his advancement. They had seven children, of whom Kiesinger's half-sister Maria died a year after she was born. Pfaff was also a Catholic. Kiesinger was therefore shaped by both denominations and later referred to himself as a "Protestant Catholic". Politically, Kiesinger grew up in a liberal, democratically minded milieu. His father subscribed to a liberal newspaper.

After visiting a Catholic primary school, Kiesinger entered the only secondary school in Ebingen, from which he graduated in 1919 as a slightly above-average student. Since he wanted to advance but was financially constrained, he only had the option of becoming a priest or a teacher. Since he did not desire to become the former, he entered the Catholic seminary in Rottweil to become the latter, which intended a six-year education. During this period, he briefly busied himself with poetry. He published poems in the newspaper Neues Albblatt and other papers, which were partially political in nature. The political poems dealt, among other things, with the situation of the fledgling Weimar Republic. In the poem Jahreswende ("Turn of the Year"), Kiesinger attacked the "enemies" of Germany, which were "tearing at the corners of the Reich" and had burdened it with "billions in debt" through the Treaty of Versailles. He did not make it clear whether he had realised the military defeat of the German Empire in World War I. Later, Kiesinger wrote a poetry collection called Wallfahrt zu Gott ("Pilgrimage to God"), which included 26 poems, that was published by his patron Friedrich Haux.

His father could only finance the tuition fees demanded by the seminary until the hyperinflation of 1923, after which Kiesinger briefly received a scholarship. During the summer breaks, he worked in a textile factory to finance his studies, which belonged to Friedrich Haux, a liberal entrepreneur. Haux began to financially support Kiesinger, which allowed Kiesinger to graduate from the seminary in 1925. This counted only as a partial Abitur; under a special clause in force at the University of Tübingen, he was able to study philosophy and history without the full Abitur.

In April 1925, the 21-year old Kiesinger would vote in the German presidential election for the first time. He did not vote for the democratic candidate, Wilhelm Marx of the Centre Party, but rather for Paul von Hindenburg. According to Gassert's estimate, Kiesinger at this point identified himself with the national conservative camp, "perhaps again to prove his independence".

Since Kiesinger was not satisfied with becoming a teacher, he made an effort to attain the Abitur after all. As a result of the German revolution of 1918–1919, this became possible at the University of Tübingen, the preparatory classes for which being hosted at the university. Kiesinger attended, besides the mandatory preparatory classes, lectures in other fields, such as those of historian Johannes Haller, who was an ardent opponent of the Weimar Republic and an early supporter of Nazism. In October 1926, Kiesinger passed the external Abitur examination at a Gymnasium in Tübingen.

=== Legal career during the Weimar Republic ===
Kiesinger, who desired to live in a major city, went to study law at the Friedrich Wilhelm University of Berlin in 1926. In Berlin, he entered into the (couleur wearing) Roman Catholic corporation KStV Askania-Burgundia Berlin, after having already been a member of the (also Catholic) KStV Alamannia Tübingen during his time in Tübingen from 1925 onward. Although the Askania wore couleur, they did not engage in the traditional academic fencing, were positive towards democracy and supported the Weimar Republic. The corporation regularly held lecture events, during which political, social and literary topics were discussed. These were organised by newly engaged Kiesinger. He was a good orator and held several of these lectures. Already in the summer of 1927, he was elected the corporation's Senior (leader).

Throughout the many social events the Askania organised, Kiesinger met many prominent Catholic and democratic politicians, who were primarily members of the Centre Party and former active members of the corporation. Among these were the former presidential candidate and chancellor Wilhelm Marx, the mayor of Cologne Konrad Adenauer, the former minister of justice Erich Emminger, the former Prussian secretary of state Aloys Lammers, his brother Clemens Lammers and the politician Hermann Pünder. Several of the former active members were, however, opponents of the Weimar Republic and sympathised with Nazism. One of the major influences on the younger members of the corporation was the devout, conservative Catholic and professor of history Martin Spahn, who was a member of the Centre Party until 1921, switching to the anti-democratic, antisemitic German National People's Party (DNVP) and later tentatively supporting Nazism towards the end of the Weimar Republic. Spahn is considered an important link between political Catholicism and Nazism in Germany.

In 1931, Kiesinger passed his first state examination with very good results. Thus, in 1931, he became an Alter Herr (i.e. non-active member) of his corporation. Afterwards, he began his preparatory service (Referendariat) at the Amtsgericht Köpenick. Since Friedrich Haux had died by this time, he had to search for a new source of income, since the preparatory service of legal trainees at this time was unpaid. Since he was very knowledgeable about the law, he began working as a private law teacher (Repetitor), preparing law students for the first state examination. He held his classes either before his service at the Amtsgericht in the morning or afterwards in the evening.

Due to Spahn's influence, by the end of the 1920s, the member corporations of the Kartellverband (KV) and the member students increasingly turned hostile towards the Weimar Republic. At the same time, the principle of belonging to the Roman Catholic church became less stringently enforced. Kiesinger had visited the Politisches Kolleg, a conservative think tank closely tied to the DNVP, already before his first state examination, in which Spahn attempted to propagate his right-wing conservative viewpoints. During the increasing conflicts between the former active members that rejected such views and active members who were more supportive, Kiesinger defended this shift to the right. Through the mediation of an aristocratic friend, with whom he worked together at the Amtsgericht Köpenick, he met several far-right nobles that had organised in the Deutscher Herrenklub, of which he became a member. From 1931, the active members of the Askania increasingly adopted Nazi ideology. In the KV as a whole, however, entering the Nazi Party (NSDAP) was still considered unacceptable as late as the summer of 1932.

== Nazi era ==
=== Legal career under the Nazi regime ===
After Hitler was appointed chancellor and the Machtergreifung began, the ban of corporation members joining the Nazi Party was lifted on 23 April 1933. Kiesinger belonged to those young academics who, "infected by Nazi ideology, chauvinism and a strong sense of German national pride, entered the Nazi movement". Kiesinger joined the party on 1 May 1933, holding the membership number 2,633,930. He also entered the National Socialist Motor Corps (NSKK). As to his motives for joining, Kiesinger later posited several different reasons. In his memoirs, he states that he desired to limit the excesses of the regime, and had joined the party to reform its ideology from within. He further writes that his motive at the beginning was to counter antisemitic racial propaganda. Kiesinger remained a fully inactive member until June 1934, when his Zellenleiter mentioned his membership and demanded that he pay his membership fees, which he did from that month onward. Additionally, between 1939 and 1940, he acted as a Blockleiter.

By Kiesinger's own account, the murders during the Night of the Long Knives on 30 June 1934 awakened him to the criminal nature of the Nazi regime. He passed his second state examination with very good grades in October 1934 and was offered a position as a judge at the Kammergericht, combined with a continuation in his position as a law teacher. Kiesinger rejected this double offer as, by his own account, he refused to voluntarily enter into the services of a criminal regime. Instead, he settled down to work as a lawyer at the Kammergericht and expanded his private law teaching. Unlike the vast majority of lawyers and other legal practitioners at the time, Kiesinger did not enter the National Socialist Association of Legal Professionals (NSRB), which regulated the coordination of clients to different lawyers.

Little is known about Kiesinger's activities as a defence lawyer. In two documented cases, he aided persons wanted by the Gestapo. Reportedly, he was able to assist them owing to his influence as an NSDAP member, thereby shielding his clients from state persecution.

=== Student functionary ===
On 8 July 1933, the Nazi-dominated German Student Union, which claimed to have authority over all German students, passed a decree which was supposed to enforce Gleichschaltung on all student corporations. Three new guidelines were to be followed by all corporations: Firstly, every corporation would need a leader in line with the Führerprinzip. Although not explicitly mentioned, every one of these leaders was expected to be a national socialist. Secondly, the Aryan ancestry of new members was to be controlled up to three generations back. Thirdly, the stipulations of the Law for the Restoration of the Professional Civil Service were to be applied to current members. This led to the expulsion of members the Nazis considered Jewish.

Kiesinger was made leader (Korporationsführer) of the Askania on 28 July 1933. With a Nazi Party member at the helm, the process of Gleichschaltung began for the corporation. The historian Gassert is of the opinion that Kiesinger was named leader because he was a compromise candidate between the more democratically minded older, former members and the more national socialist younger, active members. Kiesinger surrounded himself with a staff to which Franz-Josef Spahn, son of Martin Spahn, also belonged, and which published a newly founded magazine, called the Askanenblätter. In the first print of the magazine, published on 22 September 1933, an article authored by Kiesinger was published, in which he welcomed the development of Germany toward a dictatorship. He described the establishment of the German people's unity as the "sense of the current historical event", referring to the possible annexation of the German territories lost following World War I, as well as Austria. Kiesinger further mentioned that the continued existence of the Catholic corporations was up to the decision of Adolf Hitler alone.

This article and several other texts written by Kiesinger were kept secret by both him and the Askania for many decades because they risked embarrassment for Kiesinger and the corporation. They were uncovered by the Berlin historian Michael F. Feldkamp, who searched through archives of the corporation. During this research, a form was uncovered which was added as an appendix to the Askanenblätter issue of September 1933: It was a questionnaire about the Aryan ancestry of all active and former members of the Askania, with additional questions about activities within the corporation, military service, war decorations, whether or not members had seen frontline service, membership in the Nazi Party, the SA, SS and the Stahlhelm. The questionnaire also inquired about the religious affiliation of the members and their ancestors three generations back. Within three weeks, this questionnaire was to be answered and sent back to Kiesinger. Later, in February 1934, he apologised for the questionnaire and stated that it was appended to the Askanenblätter issue without his knowledge or approval.

Kiesinger energetically continued the Gleichschaltung. The Askania had to give up some of their real estate to the Nazi-backed Kameradschaften, which were intended as a substitute for all previous student corporations. On 31 January 1934, the principle of belonging to the Roman Catholic church was abandoned by the KV, leading to several Catholic corporations leaving the KV. Kiesinger enforced religious freedom within the Askania and prevented the corporation's dissolution. The restrictions on the corporations became heavier the more the Nazis consolidated their power. In 1935, 105 corporations of the KV were banned. Members had to endure professional disadvantages. On 15 January 1937, the active members of the Askania ceased all activities. The group of former members had to be dissolved in 1938.

=== Civil servant in the Foreign Office ===
Kiesinger received his conscription order in 1940. However, to escape military service in the Wehrmacht, he took a position in the Foreign Office under foreign minister Joachim von Ribbentrop, which he obtained through the mediation of his former student Karl-Heinz Gerstner. There, he became the deputy leader of the office's broadcasting department (Rundfunkpolitische Abteilung), which was responsible for the monitoring and influencing of foreign broadcasting. In this position, he was, among other tasks, responsible to keep connections with the Ministry of Propaganda, led by Joseph Goebbels, with whom his department frequently clashed over areas of responsibility.

Despite denial in 1947, Kiesinger was mentioned as the deputy leader of the broadcasting department in the organization chart of the ministry. He was the only scientific advisor (Wissenschaftlicher Hilfsarbeiter, WHA) who attained such a high position, equal to a ministerial director (Ministerialdirigent), directly beneath those of the secretaries of state and thus directly beneath the political leadership. According to a 1943 report of the Foreign Office, Kiesinger was responsible for coordinating international broadcasting relations including the legal-technical aspects of broadcasting, as well as responsible for "general propaganda", coordination between the different departments for specific foreign nations, and coordination between the Foreign Office and the Ministry of Propaganda.

In a document dated to 7 November 1944, which resurfaced in 1966 in the National Archives in Washington, D.C. and found its way into the hands of the magazine Der Spiegel, Kiesinger was denounced by his former colleagues Ernst Otto Dörries and Hanns Dietrich Ahrens to the Reich Security Main Office (RSHA) of the SS:

In the broadcasting department of the Foreign Office [...], the former liaison to the Ministry of Propaganda and now deputy leader Kiesinger is provably inhibiting the anti-Jewish action.

Later, especially upon his becoming chancellor, Kiesinger's early approval of Nazi rule as well as his career in the state apparatus after 1940 were criticised. He himself described his early support of the Nazi regime as "neither conviction nor opportunism"; important goals of the movement did not appear reprehensible to him. While he did not share the Nazi movement's hatred of Jews, he had not viewed it as "a serious danger".

== Early CDU career ==
=== Denazification and entry into the CDU ===
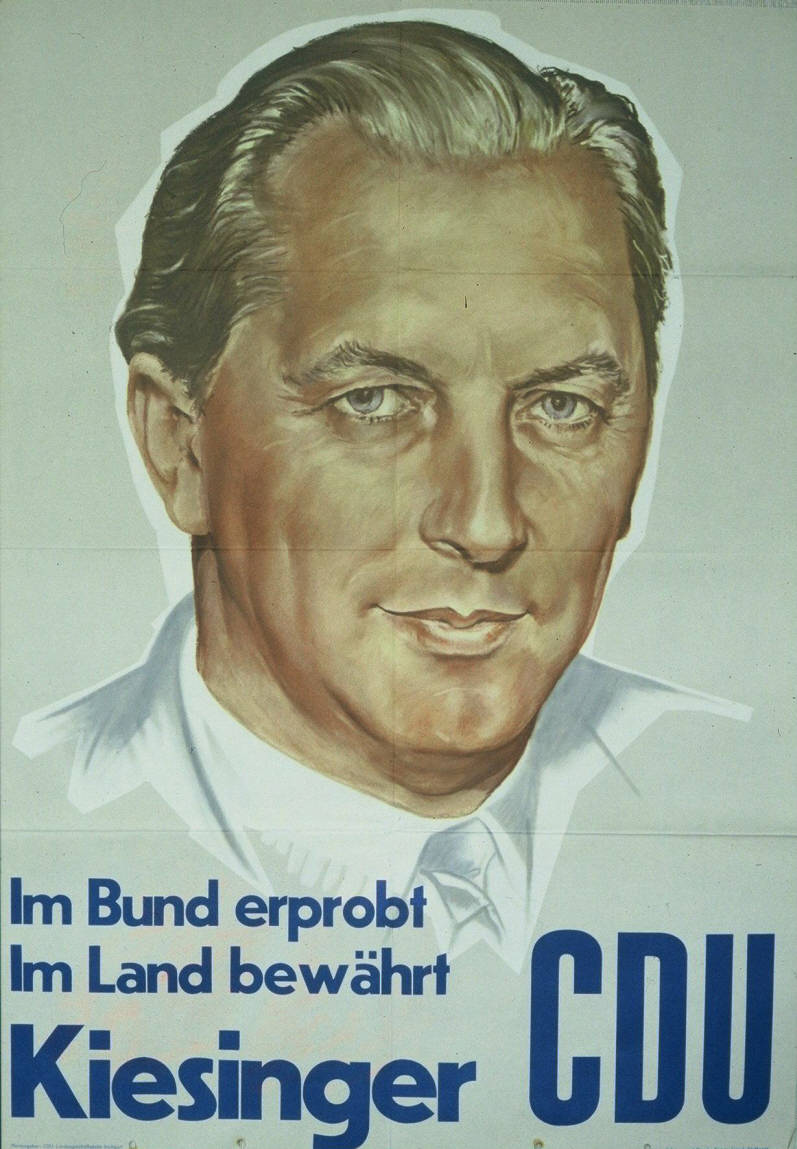
1961 election poster for Kiesinger

On 30 April 1945, Kiesinger was arrested in Benediktbeuern by the American occupation authorities because he was thought to have been a high-ranking Nazi official, but without being suspected of involvement in specific crimes. Not having given the American authorities information about himself, he was falsely suspected of having been an informer for the Sicherheitsdienst (SD). For 18 months, Kiesinger was interned in several different internment camps, ultimately ending up interned in Ludwigsburg. On 17 September 1946, Kiesinger was released and moved to Scheinfeld, where his parents-in-law resided, and where his wife and children had already moved. There, he underwent denazification, and as a member of the Nazi party was initially classified in Category IV as a "follower" (Mitläufer in German), but after appealing was reclassified in Category V as "exonerated" (Entlasteter in German) in 1948 and began practising law again, this time in Tübingen and Würzburg.

In 1946, he took up privately teaching law again. That same year, he joined the Christian Democratic Union of Germany (CDU) and in 1947 became general secretary of the CDU branch in Württemberg-Hohenzollern.

=== Bundestag deputy (1949–1958) ===
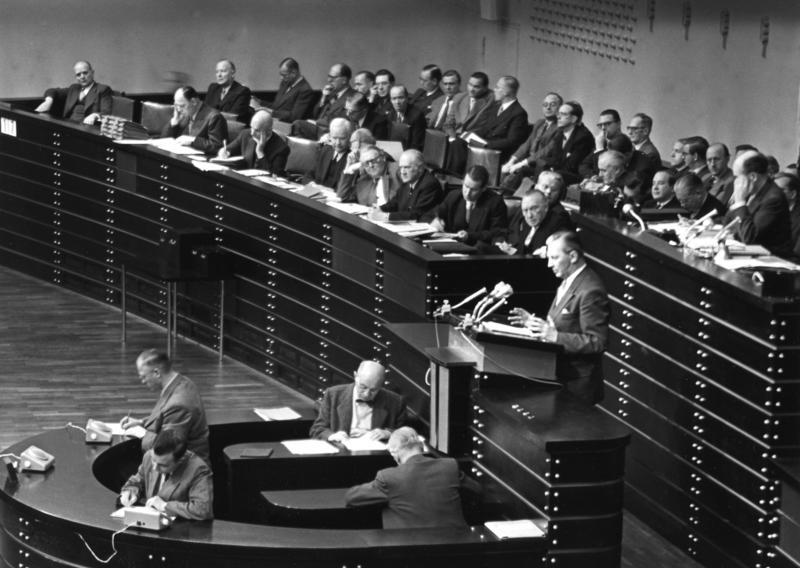
First reading of the Bonn–Paris conventions in the Bundestag, 1954

From the 1949 federal election until 19 February 1959, and again from the 1969 federal election until the 1980 federal election, Kiesinger was a member of the German Bundestag. He initially represented the electoral district of Ravensburg, in which he attained record election results, often totalling over 70% of the vote. From 1969 onward, he represented the electoral district of Waldshut. For the 1976 federal election, Kiesinger declined to run in a constituency and was instead elected on the state list of the CDU Baden-Württemberg. During his first two terms in the Bundestag (1949–1957), Kiesinger was chairman of the mediation committee between Bundestag and Bundesrat. On 19 October 1950, he obtained 55 votes for the office of President of the Bundestag against his party colleague Hermann Ehlers (who obtained 201 votes), despite not having been nominated. From 17 December 1954 until 29 January 1959, he served as chairman of the committee for foreign affairs, to which he belonged since 1949.

Kiesinger was considered to be an excellent orator, earning him the nickname "King Silver Tongue". In the 1950s, Kiesinger supported the foreign policy of chancellor Konrad Adenauer. Most famous were his debates with Bundestag deputy Fritz Erler, who was also considered rhetorically gifted.

Kiesinger looked for programmatic overlap with the Social Democratic Party (SPD). During the debate surrounding the election of the first post-war President of Germany, Theodor Heuss, upon whom Adenauer and the Free Democratic Party (FDP) had agreed as a candidate, Kiesinger advocated for a compromise with the SPD instead. On his initiative, an inter-factional committee was founded in 1950, with the task of finding a consensus between government and opposition in the questions surrounding the creation of the Federal Constitutional Court.

From 1954 until 1957, Kiesinger served as chairman of the German Parliamentary Society (DPG). From 1 July 1956 until 19 March 1958, he also belonged to the European Parliament, and served as vice president of the parliamentary assembly of the Council of Europe from 1955 until 1959. There, he concurrently served as chairman of the European People's Party (EPP) parliamentary group from 1957 to 1958 and as the chairman of the parliamentary group Christian democrats and British conservatives in the parliamentary assembly of the Western European Union from 1956 to 1958.

In 1949, Kiesinger was elected as a non-judicial member of the State Constitutional Court of Württemberg-Hohenzollern, however, due to his activities as a Bundestag deputy, he could not attend the court's sessions.

== Minister-President of Baden-Württemberg (1958–1966) ==
From 17 December 1958 until 30 November 1966, Kiesinger served as Minister-President of Baden-Württemberg as the successor of Gebhard Müller, who became president of the Federal Constitutional Court in Karlsruhe. In this period, Kiesinger also belonged to the Landtag of Baden-Württemberg, from 1960 to 1966. During his time in office the state founded two universities, the University of Konstanz and the University of Ulm.

Already in the years 1950 and 1951, when the territory that would become Baden-Württemberg was divided between the states of Baden, Württemberg-Baden and Württemberg-Hohenzollern, Kiesinger fought for their unification into a new state. Nevertheless, it was considered a surprise that he left federal politics in 1958. An important reason for the switch was the fact that Kiesinger had not received a ministerial post on the federal level following the 1957 federal election and viewed the office of minister-president as a better opportunity to prove his capabilities on a higher level than that of a Bundestag deputy. When Kiesinger at one point inquired whether or not a ministerial position would be available, Adenauer told him: "Your skin is way too thin for that".

In the early period of West German politics, oversized coalitions were not uncommon, and as a result, Kiesinger initially led a coalition of CDU, SPD, FDP/DVP and BHE. From 1960 onward, Kiesinger led a coalition of CDU and FDP, with the SPD and BHE in opposition. He served as President of the German Bundesrat from 1 November 1962 to 31 October 1963 and as Plenipotentiary of the Federal Republic of Germany for cultural matters relating to the treaty on Franco-German cooperation from 1963 until 1966. After Kiesinger was elected federal chancellor in 1966, his interior minister Hans Filbinger succeeded him as minister-president.

== Chancellor of West Germany (1966–1969) ==
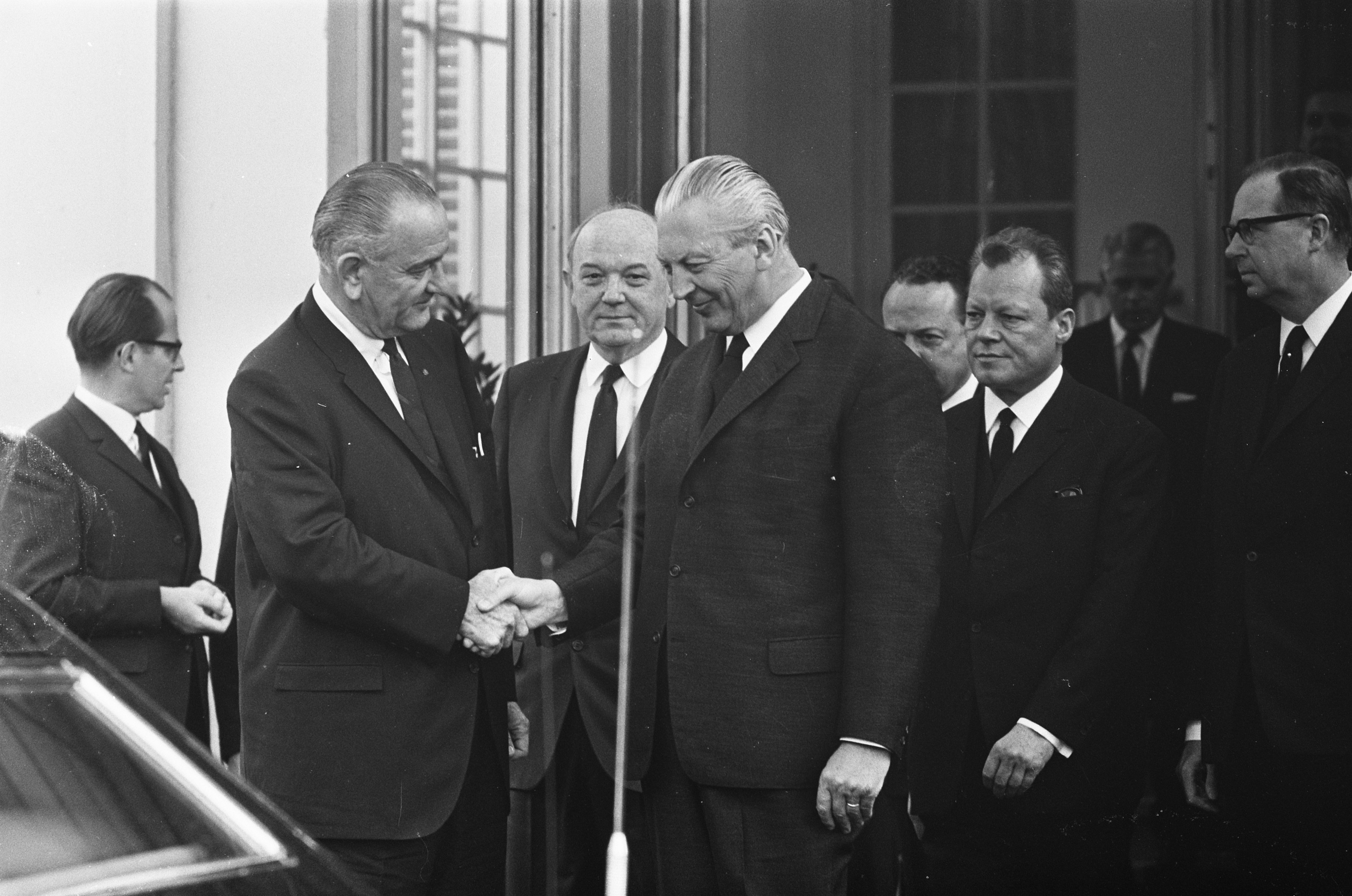
Left to right: Lyndon Johnson, Dean Rusk, Kiesinger and Willy Brandt in 1967

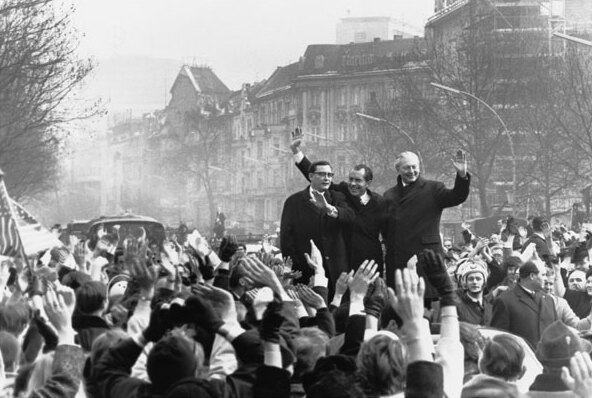
Chancellor Kurt Kiesinger and US President Richard Nixon waving to the crowd in West Berlin in 1969

On 27 October 1966, the FDP withdrew its four ministers from the second Erhard cabinet following disagreements over the federal budget. Despite Ludwig Erhard still serving as chancellor and CDU chairman, the CDU/CSU parliamentary group in the Bundestag decided to elect a new candidate for chancellor to overcome the governmental crisis. Kiesinger won the internal election against foreign minister Gerhard Schröder and parliamentary group chairman Rainer Barzel on 10 November. President of the Bundestag Eugen Gerstenmaier had declined to serve as candidate and instead endorsed Kiesinger. Already by 25 November, Kiesinger's negotiations with the FDP on forming a new government had failed. Instead, he convinced SPD chairman Willy Brandt to enter into a grand coalition on 26 November. After this agreement was reached, Erhard resigned as chancellor on 30 November.

On 1 December 1966, Kiesinger was elected Chancellor of Germany as the leader of the first grand coalition on the federal level, receiving 340 votes. Although the FDP (which was now serving as the main opposition party) had only 49 Bundestag deputies, 109 deputies voted against Kiesinger. Several SPD deputies were sceptical toward a coalition with the CDU/CSU, some also toward the idea of Kiesinger as chancellor (due to his former Nazi Party membership) and toward Franz Josef Strauss, who had resigned as defence minister due to the Spiegel affair and became finance minister in Kiesinger's cabinet. Konrad Adenauer rejected Kiesinger because of his "lack of assertiveness".

The Kiesinger cabinet united a variety of politicians with different career paths. Besides the chancellor and defence minister Gerhard Schröder, economics minister Karl Schiller had been a member of the Nazi Party, finance minister Strauss had been a Wehrmacht officer and campaigned against foreign minister and vice chancellor Willy Brandt on the basis of his status as an émigré. Brandt had been a member of the Socialist Workers' Party of Germany (SAP) and minister for German questions Herbert Wehner had been a leading member of the Communist Party of Germany (KPD).

=== Foreign policy ===
Kiesinger reduced tensions with the Soviet bloc nations, establishing diplomatic relations with Czechoslovakia, Romania, and Yugoslavia, but he opposed any major conciliatory moves. In October 1968, he visited Salazarist Portugal and Francoist Spain, which were both dictatorships at the time. In Portugal, he agreed to closer military cooperation with the local regime, while he later said about his visit to Spain: "Franco's precise analyses and the clarity of his thoughts impressed me".

=== Domestic policy ===
Kiesinger was considered a "walking mediation committee" within the coalition. On several occasions, ministers would meet with the chancellor at his holiday residence in Kressbronn am Bodensee to mediate inter-party disputes.

Despite some internal frictions, the coalition persisted until 1969 and accomplished nearly all its goals. Controversial projects, such as the heavily debated German Emergency Acts and a large reform of the German penal code (StGB) were introduced. Pension coverage was extended in 1967 via the abolition of the income ceiling for compulsory membership. In education, student grants were introduced, together with a university building programme, while a constitutional reform of 1969 empowered the federal government to be involved with the Länder in educational planning through a joint planning commission. Vocational training legislation was also introduced, while a reorganisation of unemployment insurance promoted retraining schemes, counselling and advice services, and job creation places. In addition, under the Lohnfortzahlunggesetz of 1969, employers had to pay all employees' wages for the first six weeks of sickness. In August 1969, the Landabgaberente (a higher special pension for farmers willing to cede farms that were unprofitable according to certain criteria) was introduced. One reform the coalition failed to achieve was a change to the electoral system, which would have introduced a first-past-the-post system, upon which the parties had agreed in 1966. Opposition at the SPD party base led to no compromise being found.

While in office, Kiesinger's government adhered to economic policy principles referred to as a kind of "modern dirigism" by some media outlets. His style has been described as keynesian; with certain decisions made by his coalition in the field of economics retrospectively garnering outstanding praise by some commentators.

=== Debate about Kiesinger's activities during the Nazi era ===
The historian Tony Judt has observed that Kiesinger's chancellorship, like the presidency of Heinrich Lübke, showed "a glaring contradiction in the Bonn Republic's self-image" in view of their previous Nazi allegiances. The student movement in particular viewed Kiesinger as a politician who showed the inadequacies of Germany's coming to terms with the past. The writer Günter Grass (who would later reveal himself to have been a member of the Waffen-SS) appealed through an open letter, together with Heinrich Böll, against Kiesinger becoming chancellor.

Shortly before Kiesinger was nominated for the office of chancellor by the CDU/CSU parliamentary group, journalist Conrad Ahlers, who had been on good terms with Kiesinger ever since the latter had advocated in favour of the journalists arrested during the Spiegel affair, gave him in November 1966 the denunciation document written in November 1944 by Dörries and Ahrens (see above: Civil servant in the Foreign Office). During the nomination process, Kiesinger had the document copied and sent to all members of the parliamentary group, however obscuring Dörries' name and giving it a cover which gave the impression that it was not a denunciatory document but rather a memorandum of the RSHA.

The debate surrounding Kiesinger's activity during Nazi rule gained further attention when Franco-German journalist Beate Klarsfeld slapped him in the face in public at the CDU party congress in Berlin on 7 November 1968. Klarsfeld, who was married to the French Jewish lawyer Serge Klarsfeld, whose father and many other family members had been murdered in the Holocaust, wanted to draw attention to what she regarded as Kiesinger's insufficiently well known Nazi past among the general public. In an expedited trial she was sentenced to a year in prison without the possibility of parole the very same day. Klarsfeld appealed, intending to make the appeals trial a trial of Kiesinger; when she appeared in court accompanied by the French historian Joseph Billig, an expert on Nazi Germany, the trial was postponed indefinitely, and she eventually received a sentence of four months on parole in August 1969.

While modern biographers mostly exculpate Kiesinger from having been a staunch National Socialist, critical voices, especially on the German political left, still view him as an example of an incomplete coming to terms with German history under Nazi rule. For instance, when the Bundestag deputies of CDU/CSU and FDP voted against the Left Party politician Lothar Bisky for Vice President of the Bundestag in 2005, party leader Gregor Gysi accused them of hypocrisy, referencing Kiesinger.

=== 1969 federal election ===
With the approach of the 1969 federal election, relations between the coalition parties soured. The main point of contention proved to be a possible appreciation of the Deutsche Mark, which economics minister Schiller demanded but Kiesinger categorically rejected. During the election campaign, he warned of imminent communist danger. One of his campaign speeches became famous for one such warning: "I only say this: China, China, China!"

Although the CDU/CSU again became the largest party by votes, despite smaller losses, and achieved 46.1% of the vote, it barely missed an absolute elected majority. The SPD, which attained 42.7% and the FDP, which attained 5.8%, together formed the first social-liberal coalition on the federal level and elected Willy Brandt as chancellor, inaugurating the first Brandt cabinet. Kiesinger's attempts to form a coalition with the FDP failed beforehand.

== Later years and death ==
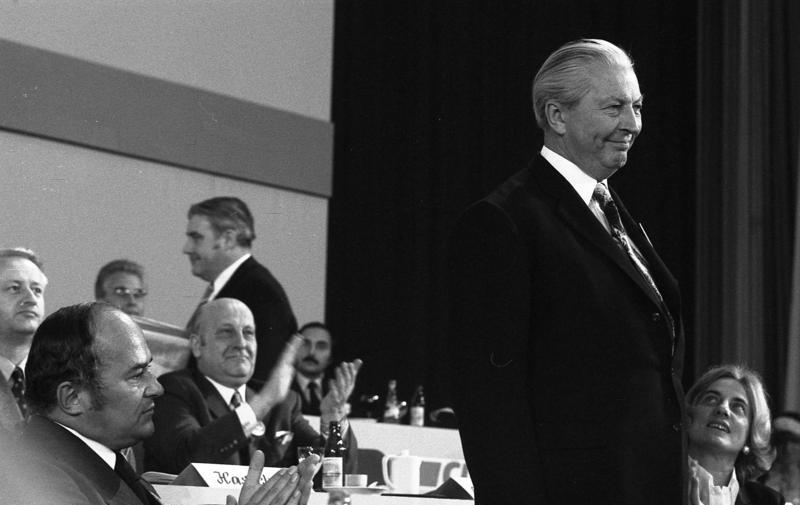
Kiesinger and Rainer Barzel (left) at the CDU party congress in 1972

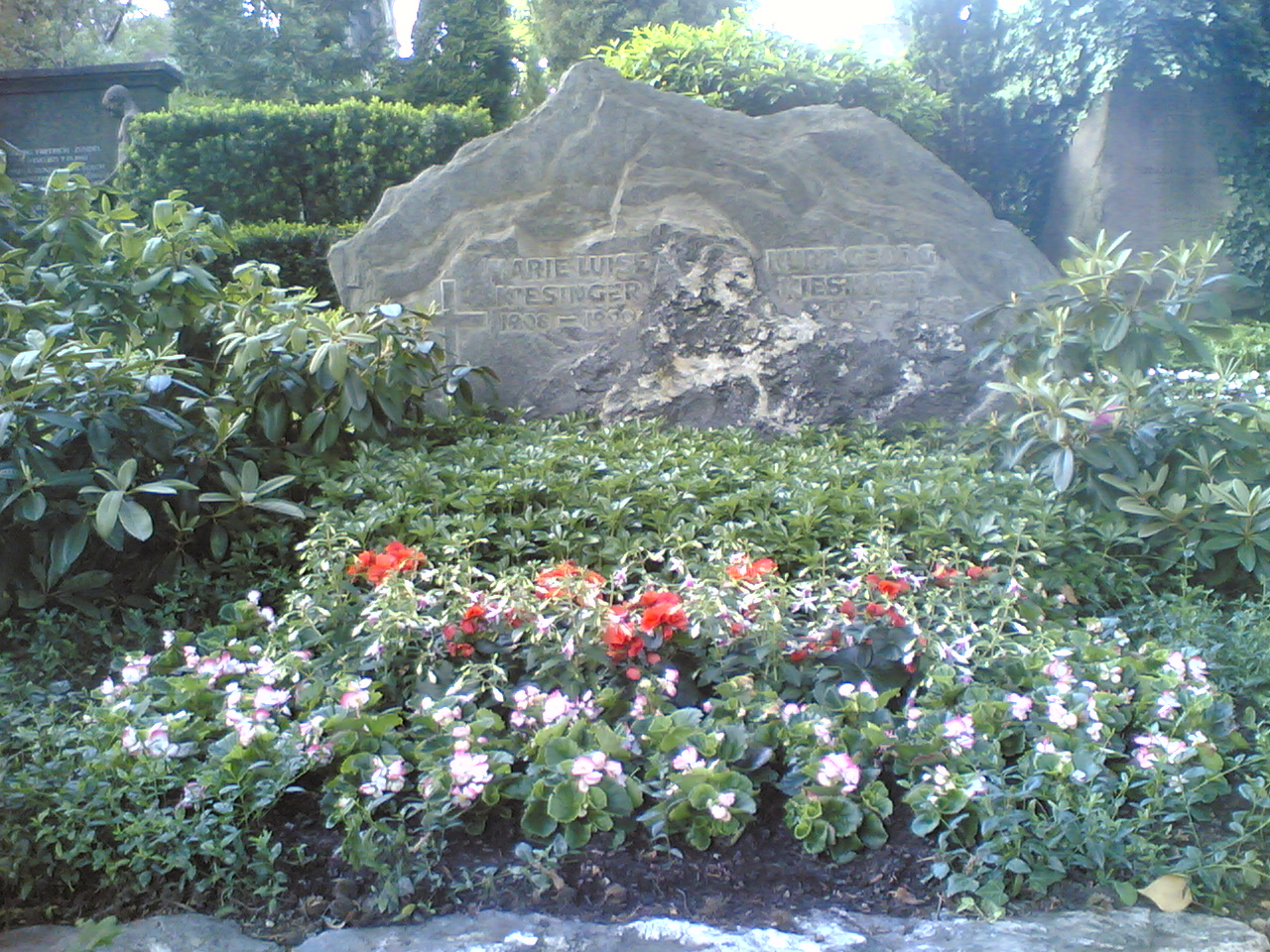
Grave of Kurt Georg Kiesinger in Tübingen

Kiesinger continued to head the CDU in opposition and remained a member of the Bundestag until 1980. In July 1971, Kiesinger was succeeded as Leader of the Christian Democratic Union by Rainer Barzel. In 1972 he held the main speech for justification to the constructive vote of no confidence by the CDU/CSU parliamentary group against Willy Brandt in the Bundestag. The election of then-CDU leader Rainer Barzel as chancellor was unsuccessful because of the bribery of Julius Steiner and probably Leo Wagner by the GDR's Stasi.

In 1980, Kiesinger ended his career as politician and worked on his memoir. Of his planned memoirs, only the first part (Dark and Bright Years) was completed, covering the years up to 1958. It was released after his death in 1989. Kiesinger died in Tübingen on 9 March 1988, 28 days short of his 84th birthday. After a requiem mass in Stuttgart's St Eberhard's Cathedral and a state memorial service on Schlossplatz, he was buried in Tübingen.

== Personal life ==
Kiesinger married Marie-Luise Schneider (1908–1990) on 24 December 1932. She was the daughter of a lawyer and notary in Berlin. He had first met her on a Rosenmontag ball hosted by the Askania. The couple had two children, Viola (born 1940) and Peter (1942–2023), who was a lawyer and a local politician for the CDU.

== Books ==
- Schwäbische Kindheit. ("Swabian childhood."), Wunderlich Verlag, Tübingen 1964.
- Ideen vom Ganzen. Reden und Betrachtungen. ("Ideas from the whole. Speeches and reflections."), Wunderlich Verlag, Tübingen 1964.
- Stationen 1949-1969. ("Stations 1949-1969."), Wunderlich Verlag, Tübingen 1969.
- Die Stellung des Parlamentariers in unserer Zeit. ("The position of the parliamentarian in our time."), Stuttgart 1981.
- Dunkle und helle Jahre: Erinnerungen 1904–1958. ("Dark and Bright Years: Memoirs 1904–1958."), Deutsche Verlags-Anstalt, Stuttgart 1989.

== Notes ==
Bundestag
Bundestag established	Member of the Bundestag for Ravensburg – Bodensee; 1949–1959	Succeeded by Eduard Adorno
Preceded by Anton Hilbert	Member of the Bundestag for Waldshut; 1969–1976	Succeeded by Norbert Nothhelfer
Party-list proportional representation	Member of the Bundestag for Baden-Württemberg; 1976–1980	Party-list proportional representation
Party political offices
Preceded by Ludwig Erhard	Leader of the Christian Democratic Union; 1967–1971	Succeeded by Rainer Barzel
Preceded by Rainer Barzel	Acting Bundestag Leader of the CDU/CSU Group; 1973	Succeeded by Karl Carstens
Political offices
Preceded by Gebhard Müller	Minister–President of Baden-Württemberg; 1958–1966	Succeeded by Hans Filbinger
Preceded by Ludwig Erhard	Chancellor of West Germany; 1966–1969	Succeeded by Willy Brandt
