= Waldshut (Bundestag electoral district) =

Federal electoral district of Germany

288 Waldshut
- Electoral district for the Bundestag
- Waldshut in 2025
- State: Baden-Württemberg
- Population: 249,500 (2019)
- Electorate: 177,275 (2021)
- Major settlements: Waldshut-Tiengen; Bad Säckingen; Wehr
- Area: 1,861.3 km^{2}

Current electoral district
- Created: 1965
- Party: CDU
- Member: Felix Schreiner
- Elected: 2017, 2021, 2025

Waldshut is an electoral constituency (German: Wahlkreis) represented in the Bundestag. It elects one member via first-past-the-post voting. Under the current constituency numbering system, it is designated as constituency 288. It is located in southwestern Baden-Württemberg, comprising the Waldshut district and the eastern part of the Breisgau-Hochschwarzwald district.

Waldshut was created for the 1965 federal election. Since 2017, it has been represented by Felix Schreiner of the Christian Democratic Union (CDU).

== Geography ==
Waldshut is located in southwestern Baden-Württemberg. As of the 2021 federal election, it comprises the district of Waldshut and the municipalities of Breitnau, Buchenbach, Eisenbach (Hochschwarzwald), Feldberg (Schwarzwald), Friedenweiler, Glottertal, Gundelfingen, Heuweiler, Hinterzarten, Kirchzarten, Lenzkirch, Löffingen, Oberried, St. Märgen, St. Peter, Schluchsee, Stegen, and Titisee-Neustadt from the Breisgau-Hochschwarzwald district.

== History ==
Waldshut was created in 1965. In the 1965 through 1976 elections, it was constituency 188 in the numbering system. In the 1980 through 1998 elections, it was number 192. In the 2002 and 2005 elections, it was number 289. Since the 2009 election, it has been number 288.

Originally, the constituency comprised the districts of Waldshut, Hochschwarzwald, and Säckingen. In the 1980 through 1998 elections, it comprised the district of Waldshut and the municipalities of Breitnau, Eisenbach, Feldberg, Friedenweiler, Hinterzarten, Lenzkirch, Löffingen, Schluchsee, and Titisee-Neustadt from the Breisgau-Hochschwarzwald district. It acquired its current borders in the 2002 election.

Election	No.	Name	Borders
1965	188	Waldshut	Waldshut district; Hochschwarzwald district; Säckingen district
1969	188	Waldshut	Waldshut district; Hochschwarzwald district; Säckingen district
1972	188	Waldshut	Waldshut district; Hochschwarzwald district; Säckingen district
1976	188	Waldshut	Waldshut district; Hochschwarzwald district; Säckingen district
1980	192	Waldshut	Waldshut district; Breisgau-Hochschwarzwald district (only Breitnau, Eisenbach, Feldberg, Friedenweiler, Hinterzarten, Lenzkirch, Löffingen, Schluchsee, and Titisee-Neustadt municipalities)
1983	192	Waldshut	Waldshut district; Breisgau-Hochschwarzwald district (only Breitnau, Eisenbach, Feldberg, Friedenweiler, Hinterzarten, Lenzkirch, Löffingen, Schluchsee, and Titisee-Neustadt municipalities)
1987	192	Waldshut	Waldshut district; Breisgau-Hochschwarzwald district (only Breitnau, Eisenbach, Feldberg, Friedenweiler, Hinterzarten, Lenzkirch, Löffingen, Schluchsee, and Titisee-Neustadt municipalities)
1990	192	Waldshut	Waldshut district; Breisgau-Hochschwarzwald district (only Breitnau, Eisenbach, Feldberg, Friedenweiler, Hinterzarten, Lenzkirch, Löffingen, Schluchsee, and Titisee-Neustadt municipalities)
1994	192	Waldshut	Waldshut district; Breisgau-Hochschwarzwald district (only Breitnau, Eisenbach, Feldberg, Friedenweiler, Hinterzarten, Lenzkirch, Löffingen, Schluchsee, and Titisee-Neustadt municipalities)
1998	192	Waldshut	Waldshut district; Breisgau-Hochschwarzwald district (only Breitnau, Eisenbach, Feldberg, Friedenweiler, Hinterzarten, Lenzkirch, Löffingen, Schluchsee, and Titisee-Neustadt municipalities)
2002	289	Waldshut	Waldshut district; Breisgau-Hochschwarzwald district (only Breitnau, Buchenbach, Eisenbach (Hochschwarzwald), Feldberg (Schwarzwald), Friedenweiler, Glottertal, Gundelfingen, Heuweiler, Hinterzarten, Kirchzarten, Lenzkirch, Löffingen, Oberried, St. Märgen, St. Peter, Schluchsee, Stegen, and Titisee-Neustadt municipalities)
2005	289	Waldshut	Waldshut district; Breisgau-Hochschwarzwald district (only Breitnau, Buchenbach, Eisenbach (Hochschwarzwald), Feldberg (Schwarzwald), Friedenweiler, Glottertal, Gundelfingen, Heuweiler, Hinterzarten, Kirchzarten, Lenzkirch, Löffingen, Oberried, St. Märgen, St. Peter, Schluchsee, Stegen, and Titisee-Neustadt municipalities)
2009	288	Waldshut	Waldshut district; Breisgau-Hochschwarzwald district (only Breitnau, Buchenbach, Eisenbach (Hochschwarzwald), Feldberg (Schwarzwald), Friedenweiler, Glottertal, Gundelfingen, Heuweiler, Hinterzarten, Kirchzarten, Lenzkirch, Löffingen, Oberried, St. Märgen, St. Peter, Schluchsee, Stegen, and Titisee-Neustadt municipalities)
2013	288	Waldshut	Waldshut district; Breisgau-Hochschwarzwald district (only Breitnau, Buchenbach, Eisenbach (Hochschwarzwald), Feldberg (Schwarzwald), Friedenweiler, Glottertal, Gundelfingen, Heuweiler, Hinterzarten, Kirchzarten, Lenzkirch, Löffingen, Oberried, St. Märgen, St. Peter, Schluchsee, Stegen, and Titisee-Neustadt municipalities)
2017	288	Waldshut	Waldshut district; Breisgau-Hochschwarzwald district (only Breitnau, Buchenbach, Eisenbach (Hochschwarzwald), Feldberg (Schwarzwald), Friedenweiler, Glottertal, Gundelfingen, Heuweiler, Hinterzarten, Kirchzarten, Lenzkirch, Löffingen, Oberried, St. Märgen, St. Peter, Schluchsee, Stegen, and Titisee-Neustadt municipalities)
2021	288	Waldshut	Waldshut district; Breisgau-Hochschwarzwald district (only Breitnau, Buchenbach, Eisenbach (Hochschwarzwald), Feldberg (Schwarzwald), Friedenweiler, Glottertal, Gundelfingen, Heuweiler, Hinterzarten, Kirchzarten, Lenzkirch, Löffingen, Oberried, St. Märgen, St. Peter, Schluchsee, Stegen, and Titisee-Neustadt municipalities)
2025	288	Waldshut	Waldshut district; Breisgau-Hochschwarzwald district (only Breitnau, Buchenbach, Eisenbach (Hochschwarzwald), Feldberg (Schwarzwald), Friedenweiler, Glottertal, Gundelfingen, Heuweiler, Hinterzarten, Kirchzarten, Lenzkirch, Löffingen, Oberried, St. Märgen, St. Peter, Schluchsee, Stegen, and Titisee-Neustadt municipalities)

== Members ==
The constituency has been held continuously by Christian Democratic Union (CDU) since its creation. It was first represented by Anton Hilbert from 1965 to 1969. Former Chancellor Kurt Georg Kiesinger was representative from 1969 to 1976. Norbert Nothhelfer served from 1976 to 1980, followed by Werner Dörflinger from 1980 to 1998. Thomas Dörflinger was representative from 1998 to 2017. Felix Schreiner was elected in 2017 and re-elected in 2021.

Election	Member	Party	%
1965	Anton Hilbert	CDU	56.3
1969	Kurt Georg Kiesinger	CDU	62.6
1972	Kurt Georg Kiesinger	CDU	55.7
1976	Norbert Nothhelfer	CDU	57.2
1980	Werner Dörflinger	CDU	54.4
1983	Werner Dörflinger	CDU	62.7
1987	Werner Dörflinger	CDU	57.4
1990	Werner Dörflinger	CDU	56.4
1994	Werner Dörflinger	CDU	52.6
1998	Thomas Dörflinger	CDU	45.3
2002	Thomas Dörflinger	CDU	45.9
2005	Thomas Dörflinger	CDU	46.7
2009	Thomas Dörflinger	CDU	41.5
2013	Thomas Dörflinger	CDU	51.4
2017	Felix Schreiner	CDU	41.9
2021	Felix Schreiner	CDU	33.6
2025	Felix Schreiner	CDU	37.7

== Election results ==
=== 2025 election ===
Federal election (2025): Waldshut
Notes:	Blue background denotes the winner of the electorate vote. Pink background denotes a candidate elected from their party list. Yellow background denotes an electorate win by a list member, or other incumbent. A ✓ or ✗ denotes status of any incumbent, win or lose respectively.						
Party	Candidate	Votes	%	±%	Party votes	%	±%
CDU	✓ Felix Schreiner	54,464	37.7	▲4.1	48,694	33.7	▲7.3
SPD	Rita Schwarzelühr-Sutter	26,960	18.7	▼6.9	20,751	14.3	▼8.5
AfD	Andrea Zürcher	26,708	18.5	▲10.0	27,608	19.1	▲10.7
Greens	Jan-Lukas Schmitt	16,809	11.6	▼3.7	19,776	13.7	▼3.6
Left	Julian Besemann	6,839	4.7	▲2.1	8,199	5.7	▲2.8
FDP	Nathalie Wagner	5,169	3.6	▼4.0	7,212	5.0	▼8.7
FW	Stephan Schneider	4,321	3.0	▲0.4	2,411	1.7	▼0.2
Volt	Domenic Gehrmann	1,761	1.2	▲0.6	1,184	0.8	▲0.3
dieBasis	Jürgen Geillinger	1,372	1.0	▼2.0	623	0.4	▼2.3
BSW					5,742	4.0	
Tierschutzpartei					1,207	0.8	▲0.4
PARTEI					541	0.4	▼0.3
ÖDP				▼0.7	286	0.	▼0.1
Bündnis C					220	0.2	0.0
BD					176	0.1	
MLPD					41	0.0	Steady
Bürgerbewegung					160	0.1	
Gesundheitsforschung					155	0.1	
DiB					113	0.1	▼0.1
NPD					110	0.1	▼0.1
Humanists					102	0.1	
Bündnis 21					53	0.0	
MLPD					34	0.0	0.0
Informal votes		1,029			761		
Total valid votes		144,403			144,671		
Turnout		145,432	82.5	▲5.7			
CDU hold	Majority	27,504	19.0	▲11.0			

=== 2021 election ===
Federal election (2021): Waldshut
Notes:	Blue background denotes the winner of the electorate vote. Pink background denotes a candidate elected from their party list. Yellow background denotes an electorate win by a list member, or other incumbent. A ✓ or ✗ denotes status of any incumbent, win or lose respectively.						
Party	Candidate	Votes	%	±%	Party votes	%	±%
CDU	✓ Felix Schreiner	45,335	33.6	▼8.2	35,595	26.4	▼12.9
SPD	Rita Schwarzelühr-Sutter	34,449	25.5	▲1.5	30,782	22.8	▲6.4
Greens	Jan-Lukas Schmitt	20,679	15.3	▲3.5	23,294	17.3	▲3.3
AfD	Andrea Zürcher	11,420	8.5	▼0.7	11,265	8.3	▼1.5
FDP	Jareem Khawaja	10,217	7.6	▲1.4	18,422	13.6	▲2.8
dieBasis	Ursula Halfmann	3,975	2.9		3,634	2.7	
Left	Robert Kuhlmann	3,606	2.7	▼2.3	3,895	2.9	▼2.6
FW	Dominik Brox	3,482	2.6	▲1.5	2,534	1.9	▲1.1
Tierschutzpartei					1,732	1.3	▲0.4
PARTEI					894	0.7	▲0.1
ÖDP	Kilian Kronimus	895	0.7	▼0.1	469	0.3	0.0
Volt	Domenic Gehrmann	819	0.6		656	0.5	
Pirates					471	0.3	0.0
Team Todenhöfer					391	0.3	
Bündnis C					216	0.2	
Bürgerbewegung					160	0.1	
Gesundheitsforschung					155	0.1	
DiB					113	0.1	▼0.1
NPD					110	0.1	▼0.1
Humanists					102	0.1	
Bündnis 21					53	0.0	
MLPD					34	0.0	0.0
LKR					28	0.0	
DKP					17	0.0	0.0
Informal votes		1,318			1,173		
Total valid votes		134,877			135,022		
Turnout		136,195	76.8	0.0			
CDU hold	Majority	10,886	8.1	▼9.7			

=== 2017 election ===
Federal election (2017): Waldshut
Notes:	Blue background denotes the winner of the electorate vote. Pink background denotes a candidate elected from their party list. Yellow background denotes an electorate win by a list member, or other incumbent. A ✓ or ✗ denotes status of any incumbent, win or lose respectively.						
Party	Candidate	Votes	%	±%	Party votes	%	±%
CDU	Felix Schreiner	56,528	41.9	▼9.6	53,066	39.3	▼10.0
SPD	Rita Schwarzelühr-Sutter	32,522	24.1	▼3.9	22,122	16.4	▼2.6
Greens	Ulrich Martin Drescher	16,030	11.9	▲1.8	18,842	13.9	▲2.9
AfD	Martina Nicola Böswald	12,388	9.2		13,299	9.8	▲5.1
FDP	Daniel Poznanski	8,402	6.2	▲2.9	14,647	10.8	▲5.1
Left	Lothar Schuchmann	6,767	5.0	▲0.6	7,369	5.5	▲1.1
Tierschutzpartei					1,235	0.9	▲0.2
FW	Hans Dieter Ruby	1,414	1.0		1,117	0.8	▲0.1
PARTEI					781	0.6	
ÖDP	Kilian Kronimus	1,008	0.7	▼0.7	534	0.4	▼0.1
Pirates					432	0.3	▼1.5
Tierschutzallianz					309	0.2	
NPD					305	0.2	▼0.5
BGE					270	0.2	
DM					219	0.2	
DiB					188	0.1	
Menschliche Welt					183	0.1	
V-Partei³					144	0.1	
DIE RECHTE					35	0.0	
MLPD					22	0.0	0.0
DKP					10	0.0	
Informal votes		1,536			1,466		
Total valid votes		135,059			135,129		
Turnout		136,595	76.8	▲4.2			
CDU hold	Majority	24,006	17.8	▼5.6			

=== 2013 election ===
Federal election (2013): Waldshut
Notes:	Blue background denotes the winner of the electorate vote. Pink background denotes a candidate elected from their party list. Yellow background denotes an electorate win by a list member, or other incumbent. A ✓ or ✗ denotes status of any incumbent, win or lose respectively.						
Party	Candidate	Votes	%	±%	Party votes	%	±%
CDU	✓ Thomas Dörflinger	65,009	51.4	▲9.9	62,610	49.3	▲12.6
SPD	Rita Schwarzelühr-Sutter	35,359	28.0	▼0.6	24,130	19.0	▲0.3
Greens	Peter Schanz	12,768	10.1	▼0.6	13,987	11.0	▼2.7
Left	Nicole Stadler	5,613	4.4	▼1.3	5,482	4.3	▼2.0
FDP	Karsten Jung	4,184	3.3	▼7.8	7,307	5.8	▼12.9
AfD					5,979	4.7	
Pirates					2,335	1.8	0.0
ÖDP	Mike Schinkel	1,814	1.4	▲0.7	683	0.5	0.0
NPD	Philip-Mario Hallasch	1,694	1.3	0.0	947	0.7	0.0
FW					890	0.7	
Tierschutzpartei					876	0.7	0.0
REP					635	0.5	▼0.5
Volksabstimmung					344	0.3	0.0
RENTNER					314	0.2	
PBC					228	0.2	▼0.3
PRO					97	0.1	
Party of Reason					95	0.1	
BIG					46	0.0	
MLPD					30	0.0	0.0
BüSo					21	0.0	0.0
Informal votes		2,367			1,772		
Total valid votes		126,441			127,036		
Turnout		128,808	72.6	▲2.1			
CDU hold	Majority	29,650	23.4	▲10.4			

=== 2009 election ===
Federal election (2009): Waldshut
Notes:	Blue background denotes the winner of the electorate vote. Pink background denotes a candidate elected from their party list. Yellow background denotes an electorate win by a list member, or other incumbent. A ✓ or ✗ denotes status of any incumbent, win or lose respectively.						
Party	Candidate	Votes	%	±%	Party votes	%	±%
CDU	✓ Thomas Dörflinger	50,967	41.5	▼5.1	45,201	36.6	▼4.7
SPD	Rita Schwarzelühr-Sutter (Note: Schwarzelühr-Sutter entered the Bundestag on the SPD list after the resignation of Hermann Scheer in October 2010.)	35,026	28.5	▼8.9	23,058	18.7	▼11.1
FDP	Michael Klotzbücher	13,686	11.2	▲5.2	22,993	18.6	▲7.8
Greens	Ruth Cremer-Ricken	13,091	10.7	▲3.5	16,971	13.8	▲2.9
Left	Lothar Schuchmann	7,100	5.8		7,765	6.3	▲3.1
Pirates					2,244	1.8	
REP					1,190	1.0	▼0.1
NPD	Günther Ragg	1,667	1.4	▼0.3	941	0.8	▼0.1
Tierschutzpartei					869	0.7	
ÖDP	Bernd Topka	843	0.7		611	0.5	
PBC					574	0.5	▼0.1
Volksabstimmung					370	0.3	
Independent	Gero Greb	349	0.3				
DIE VIOLETTEN					338	0.3	
DVU					74	0.1	
BüSo					67	0.1	0.0
ADM					48	0.0	
MLPD					38	0.0	0.0
Informal votes		2,689			2,066		
Total valid votes		122,729			123,352		
Turnout		125,418	70.5	▼6.7			
CDU hold	Majority	15,941	13.0	▲3.8			

=== 2005 election ===
Federal election (2005):Waldshut
Notes:	Blue background denotes the winner of the electorate vote. Pink background denotes a candidate elected from their party list. Yellow background denotes an electorate win by a list member, or other incumbent. A ✓ or ✗ denotes status of any incumbent, win or lose respectively.						
Party	Candidate	Votes	%	±%	Party votes	%	±%
CDU	✓ Thomas Dörflinger	62,042	46.7	▲0.8	55,509	4.4	▼1.7
SPD	Rita Schwarzelühr-Sutter	49,759	37.4	▲0.3	39,923	29.8	▼3.5
Greens	Timo Smieszek	9,556	7.2	▼1.6	14,624	10.9	▼0.8
FDP	Jürgen Gerdes	7,959	6.0	▼0.3	14,549	10.8	▲3.2
Left					4,325	3.2	▲2.3
NPD	Christoph Bauer	2,235	1.7		1,122	0.8	▲0.6
REP					1,456	1.1	▲0.2
PBC	Peter Odenbach	1,433	1.1	▲0.2	815	0.6	▲0.1
Familie					1,012	0.8	
GRAUEN					597	0.4	▲0.3
BüSo					99	0.1	▲0.1
MLPD					84	0.1	
Informal votes		3,453			2,322		
Total valid votes		132,984			134,115		
Turnout		136,437	77.2	▼2.4			
CDU hold	Majority	12,283	9.3				
