= Anton Hilbert =

German politician (1898–1986)

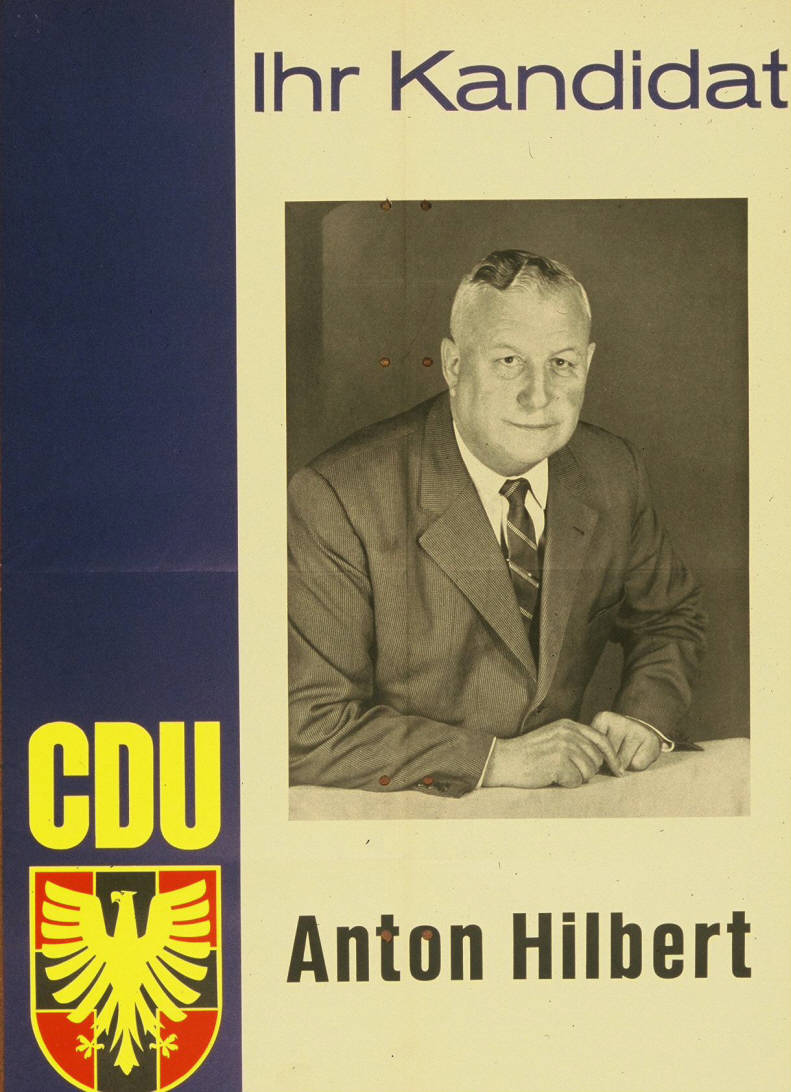
- 1961 election poster

Member of the Bundestag
- In office September 7, 1949 – October 20, 1969
- Preceded by: Constituency established
- Succeeded by: Kurt Georg Kiesinger
- Constituency: Donaueschingen (1949–1965); Waldshut (1965–1969)

Personal details
- Born: 24 December 1898 Eggingen, Germany
- Died: February 16, 1986 (aged 87) Stühlingen, West Germany
- Party: Christian Democratic Union

Anton Hilbert (December 24, 1898 – February 16, 1986) was a German politician of the Christian Democratic Union (CDU) and former member of the German Bundestag.

== Life ==
In 1945 he participated in the foundation of the CDU in Thuringia. After returning to Baden, he joined the BCSV there in the same year, which later became the Baden regional association of the CDU. From 1948 to 1962 he was deputy state chairman of the CDU in southern Baden.

From 1946 to 1947 Hilbert was a member of the Consultative State Assembly, from 1947 to 1952 of the Landtag of Baden and then until 1956 of the Landtag of Baden-Württemberg. As of March 7, 1949, he was a member of the Parliamentary Council.

Hilbert was a member of the German Bundestag from its first election in 1949 to 1969. He first represented the constituency of Donaueschingen and since 1965 the constituency of Waldshut in Parliament. From September 21, 1949, to January 17, 1950, he was deputy chairman of the CDU/CSU parliamentary group.

== Literature ==
Herbst, Ludolf; Jahn, Bruno (2002). Vierhaus, Rudolf (ed.). Biographisches Handbuch der Mitglieder des Deutschen Bundestages. 1949–2002 [Biographical Handbook of the Members of the German Bundestag. 1949–2002] (in German). München: De Gruyter - De Gruyter Saur. p. 1715. ISBN 978-3-11-184511-1.
