= Felix Schreiner =

German politician

Felix Schreiner MdB
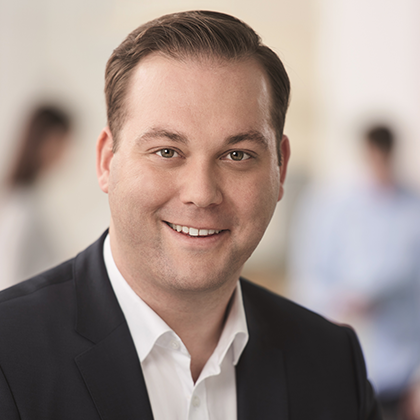
- Schreiner in 2017

Member of the Bundestag; for Waldshut
- Incumbent
- Assumed office 24 October 2017
- Preceded by: Thomas Dörflinger

Member of the; Landtag of Baden-Württemberg; for Waldshut
- In office 1 May 2011 – 24 October 2017
- Preceded by: Peter Straub
- Succeeded by: Sabine Hartmann-Müller

Personal details
- Born: 29 January 1986 (age 40) Waldshut, West Germany
- Party: Christian Democratic Union

Felix Schreiner (born 29 January 1986) is a German politician of the Christian Democratic Union (CDU) who has been serving as a member of the Bundestag from the state of Baden-Württemberg since 2017.

== Political career ==
Schreiner first became a member of the Bundestag in the 2017 German federal election. In parliament, he has since been a member of the Committee on Transport and Digital Infrastructure. In 2022, he also joined the Parliamentary Advisory Board on Sustainable Development.

== Other activities ==
- Federal Network Agency for Electricity, Gas, Telecommunications, Posts and Railway (BNetzA), Alternate Member of the Rail Infrastructure Advisory Council (since 2022)
