= Katholischer Studentenverein Arminia =

German student society

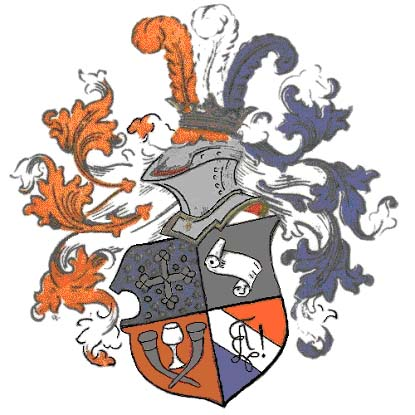
- Founded: November 6, 1863; 162 years ago University of Bonn
- Type: Studentenvereine
- Affiliation: KV
- Status: Active
- Emphasis: Catholic
- Scope: Local
- Motto: Treu, frei! "Loyal, straightforward!"
- Pillars: Religio, Scientia and Amicitia
- Colors: Orange, White and Blue
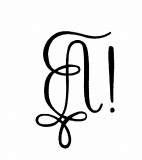
- Zirkel

- Flag
- Chapters: 1
- Nickname: K.St.V. Arminia
- Headquarters: Kaiserstrasse 85; Bonn 53113; Germany
- Website: www.kstv-arminia.de

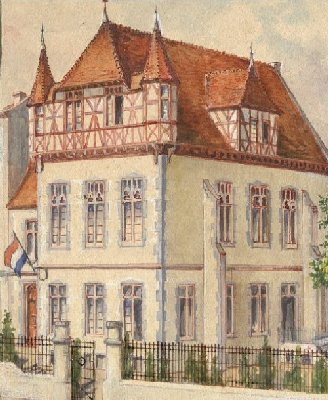
Arminia's Gothic Revival “Beer-Cathedral” at Bonn (1900– today)

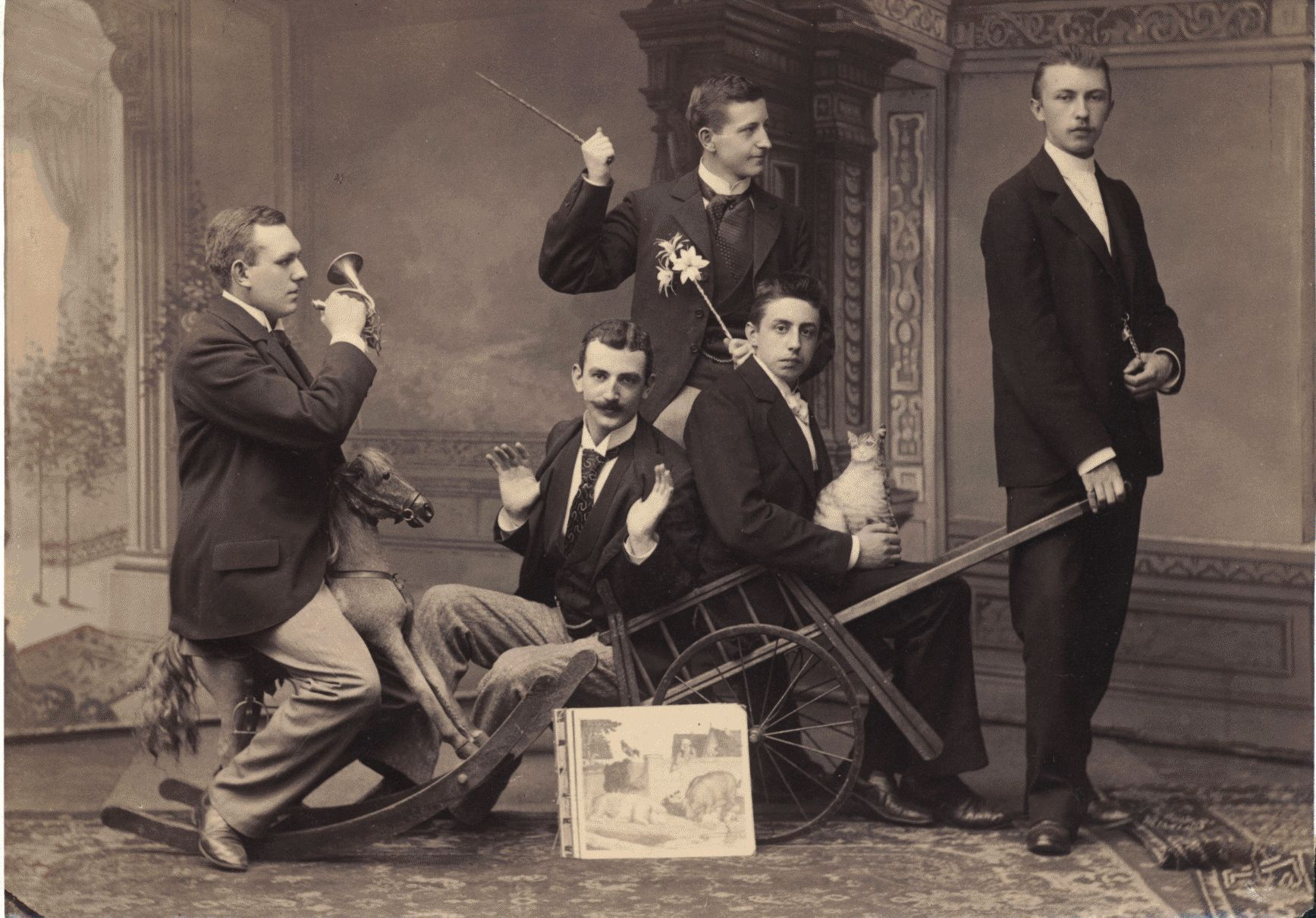
Arminia's board in 1896–97 - on the very right side Konrad Adenauer

The Katholischer Studentenverein Arminia (Catholic Students Society Arminia, also known as K.St.V. Aminia) is one of Germany's oldest Catholic male student societies.

== History ==
Arminia is a student association founded on 6 November 1863 at the University of Bonn. The name was chosen in reference to Arminius, the chief of the Cherusci who drove the Romans out of Germany and thus became a symbol of the – not yet unified – fatherland in the 19th century. In 1865 Arminia, among four other Catholic corporations, became the founder of the Kartellverband katholischer deutscher Studentenvereine (KV), Germany's second oldest umbrella organisation of Catholic male student societies.

In accordance with the Catholic faith and teachings, Arminia strictly refuses academic fencing. It has approximately 350 members, including "Aktive" (students) and "Alte Herren" (alumni).

== Symbols ==
Arminia's motto is Treu, frei! or "Loyal, straightforward!". Arminia's principles are (Latin) religio, scientia and amicitia. Its members do not wear couleur. Its flag is orange, white, and blue. Its nickname is K.St.V. Arminia.

== Notable members ==
- Konrad Adenauer (1876–1967), first postwar German chancellor, German Minister of Foreign Affaires, Father of the House (Bundestag), President of the Parliamentary Council, President of the Prussian Council of State
- Karl Albrecht Jr., director of Aldi, son of Karl Albrecht (born 1920), the wealthiest man in Germany
- Rainer Ludwig Claisen (1851–1930), famous German chemist
- August Everding (1928–1999), outstanding German opera director and administrator of the 20th century whose productions were performed in all major international houses
- Michael F. Feldkamp (born 1962) German historian and journalist on the staff of the German Bundestag
- Adolf Fritzen (1838–1919), Archbishop of Strasbourg
- Georg Count Hertling (1843–1919), Chancellor of the German Empire, Minister President of Prussia, Foreign Minister of Prussia, Minister-President of Bavaria
- Wilhelm Marx (1863–1946), Chancellor of the German Empire, Minister President of Prussia, Minister of Justice of the German Empire
- Hans Müller (1884–1961), President of the Federal Fiscal Court
- Joseph Schneider (1900–1986), first President of the Federal Social Court
- Karl Trimborn (1854–1921), Secretary of State of the Ministry of the Interior of the German Empire
- Ludwig von Pastor (1854–1928), one of the most important Catholic historians, ambassador of the Republic of Austria to the Holy See
- Heinrich Weitz (1890–1962), President of the German Red Cross
