= Thomas Dörflinger =

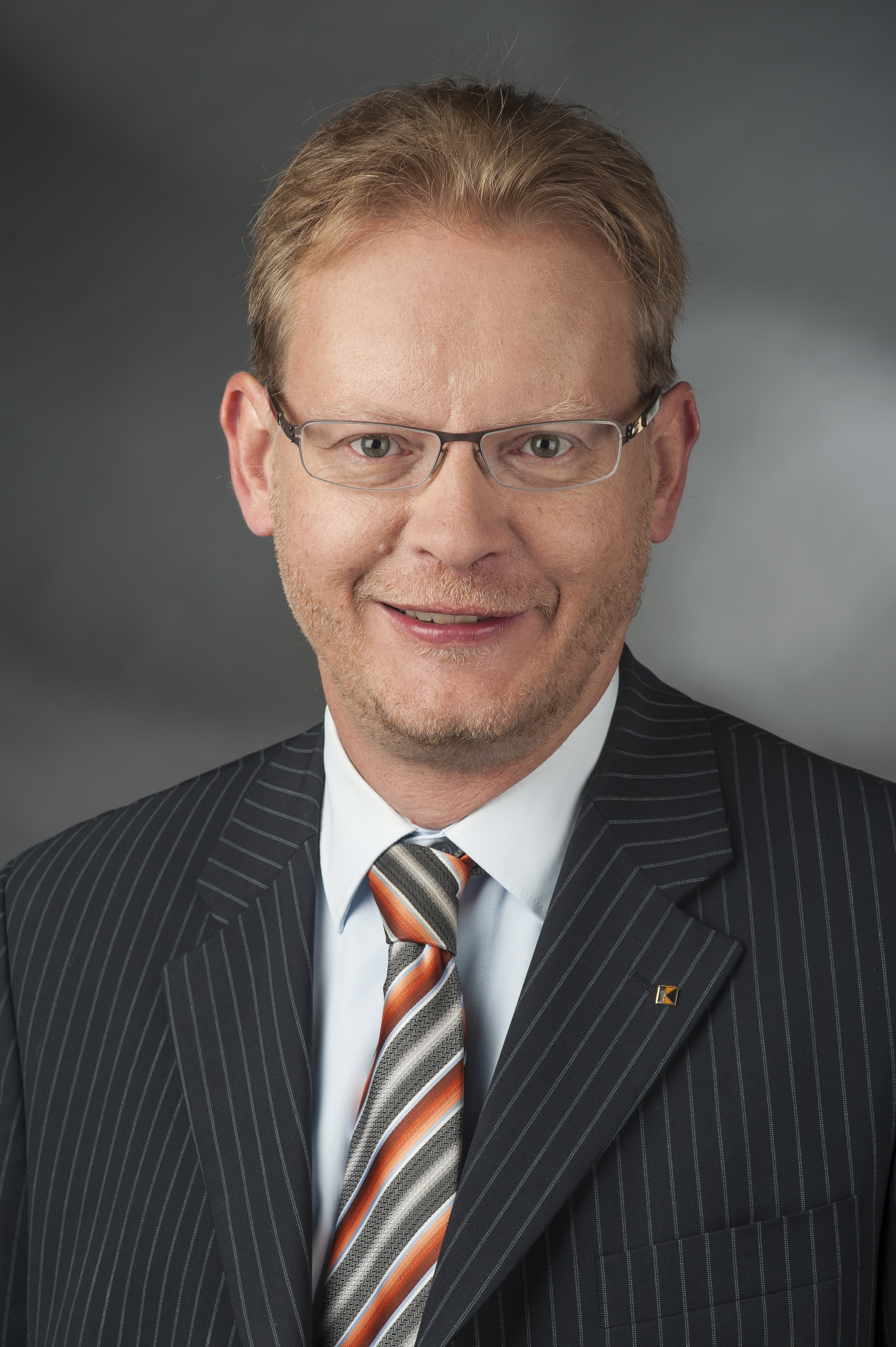
- Dörflinger in 2014

Member of the Bundestag; for Waldshut
- In office 26 October 1998 – 24 October 2017
- Preceded by: Werner Dörflinger
- Succeeded by: Felix Schreiner

Personal details
- Born: 27 August 1965 (age 60) Waldshut-Tiengen, Germany
- Party: Christian Democratic Union
- Children: 2
- Parent: Werner Dörflinger (father)
- Education: University of Konstanz

Thomas Dörflinger (born 27 August 1965) is a German politician of the CDU. He was a member of the Bundestag from 1998 to 2017 and is now active as a businessman.

== Life ==
Dörflinger is Catholic, married and has two sons. His father, Werner Dörflinger was also member of the Bundestag from 1980 to 1998.

== Politics ==
As a student, Dörflinger joined the Junge Union in 1979 and became a member of the CDU as well in 1984. Within the party, he belonged to the so-called "Berliner Kreis", an informal group of conservative members that heavily crizised Merkel.

From 1998 to 2017, he was a member of the German Bundestag. He was elected by winning the Waldshut electoral district.

== Publications ==
- „Kraft im Glauben – correctio fraterna für die Politik“ in: Georg Ratzinger, Roger Zörb (Hg.): Zum 85. Geburtstag Festschrift der Gesellschaft zur Förderung öffentlicher Verantwortung e.V. für den Heiligen Vater, Papst Benedikt XVI, 2012, S. 60ff., ISBN 978-3-00-037853-9
- "Christliche Vordenker der Sozialen Marktwirtschaft", fe-Medienverlag Kisslegg, 2020, ISBN 978-3-86357-287-7
- „Nicht nur in Kirche und Betkammern“ – Kolpings Auftrag geht weiter, Kolping-Verlag Köln, 2020
- „Gott stellt jeden dorthin, wo er ihn braucht“ – Verbandsgeschichte in Lebensbildern, mit Ulrich Vollmer, Band 1, Kolping-Verlag Köln, 2023, ISBN 978-3-921425-90-9
- "Und es begab sich / 20 Zeilen, die die Welt verändern - Gedanken zur vielleicht wichtigsten Geschichte der Menschheit", fe-Medienverlag Kisslegg, 2024, ISBN 978-3-86357-440-6
- „Wer Menschen gewinnen will, muss das Herz zum Pfande einsetzen“ - Verbandsgeschichte in Lebensbildern, mit Ulrich Vollmer, Band 2, Kolping-Verlag Köln, 2024, ISBN 978-3-921425-91-6
