= Friedenweiler =

- Municipality
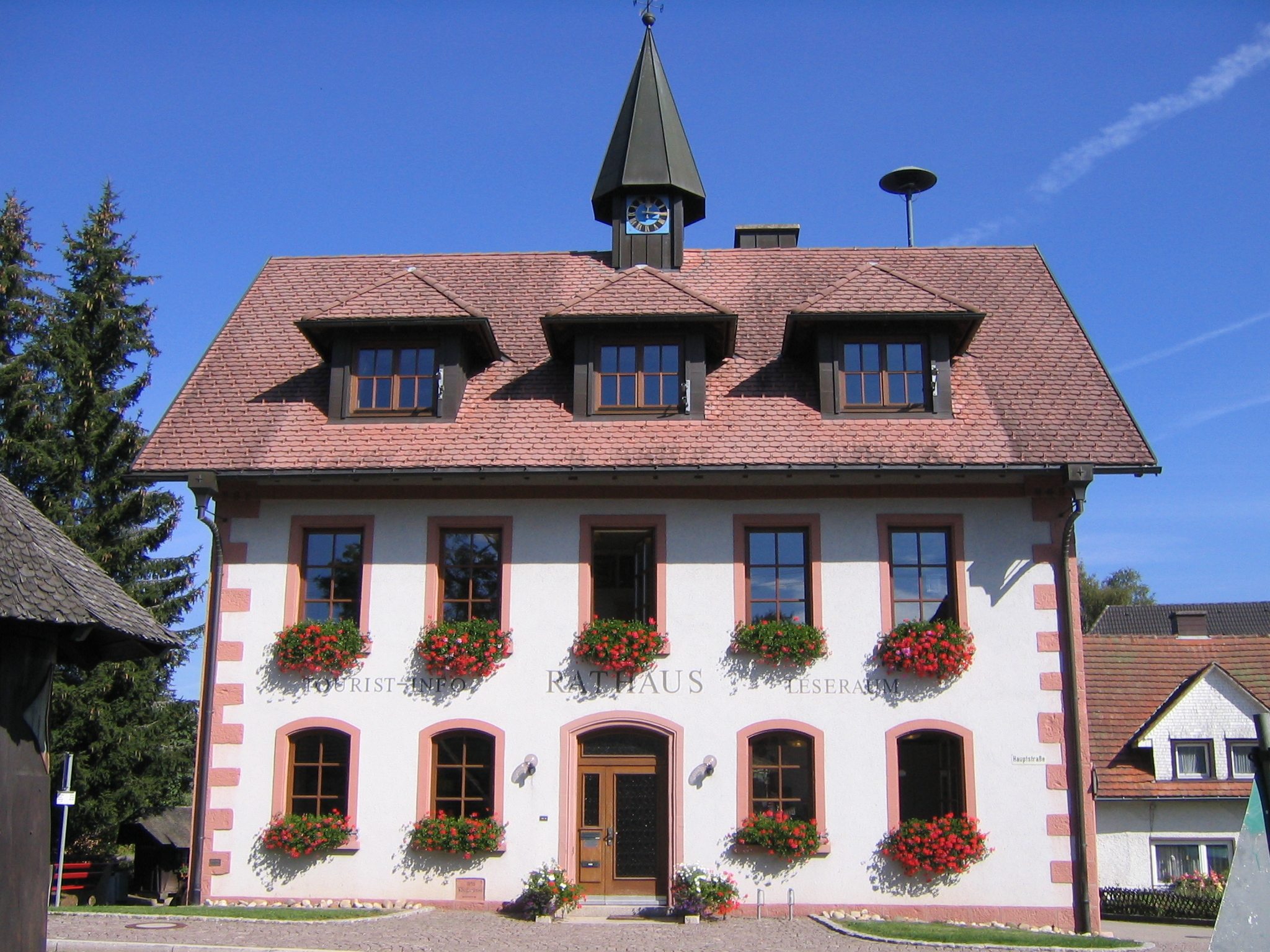
- Town hall

- Coat of arms

- Location of Friedenweiler within Breisgau-Hochschwarzwald district
- Interactive map of Friedenweiler
- Location within Germany Location within Baden-Württemberg
- Coordinates: 47°55′3″N 8°15′20″E
- Country: Germany
- State: Baden-Württemberg
- Admin. region: Freiburg
- District: Breisgau-Hochschwarzwald
- Subdivisions: 2

Government
  - Mayor (2020–28): Josef Matt

Area
  - Total: 27.08 km^{2} (10.46 sq mi)
- Elevation: 900 m (3,000 ft)

Population (2025-12-31)
  - Total: 2,064
  - Density: 76.22/km^{2} (197.4/sq mi)
- Time zone: UTC+01:00 (CET)
  - Summer (DST): UTC+02:00 (CEST)
- Postal codes: 79877
- Dialling codes: 07654
- Vehicle registration: FR
- Website: www.friedenweiler.de

Friedenweiler is a town in the district of Breisgau-Hochschwarzwald in Baden-Württemberg in southern Germany. It is 10 km north of Titisee-Neustadt.
