= Werner Dörflinger =

German politician (1940–2021)

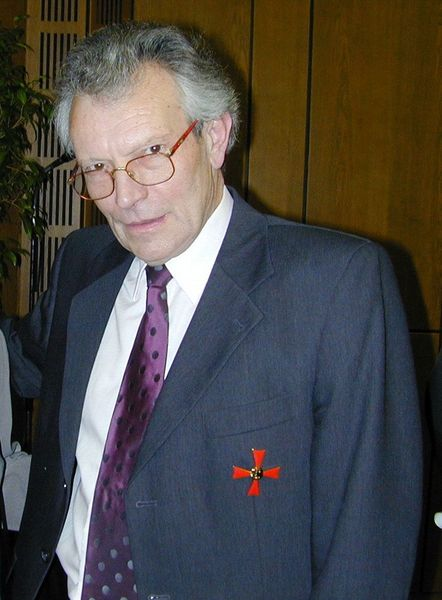
- Dörflinger in 2001

Member of the Bundestag; for Waldshut
- In office 4 November 1980 – 26 October 1998
- Preceded by: Norbert Nothhelfer
- Succeeded by: Thomas Dörflinger

Personal details
- Born: 2 October 1940 Waldshut-Tiengen, Germany
- Died: 2 March 2021 (aged 80)
- Party: Christian Democratic Union
- Children: 3, including Thomas

Werner Dörflinger (2 October 1940 – 2 March 2021) was a German politician of the Christian Democratic Union (CDU) and a former member of the German Bundestag.

== Life ==
Dörflinger joined the CDU in 1961 and was chairman of the Waldshut district association of the Junge Union for ten years. Within the CDU he was deputy chairman from 1967 to 1991 and chairman of the Waldshut district association from 1991 to 1993. He was elected to the city council of Tiengen in 1965 and confirmed in 1971. In 1975, he also moved into the council of the newly formed city of Waldshut-Tiengen. Since 1994 he was again a member of the city council. From 1989 to 1994 he was a member of the Waldshut County Council.

He was a member of the German Bundestag for five election periods from 4 November 1980 to 26 October 1998. He was elected directly for the CDU in the Waldshut constituency. In the Bundestag, he had been chairman of the Committee for Regional Planning, Building and Urban Development since February 1992. He was married. His son is politician Thomas Dörflinger.
