= Flak-Kaserne Ludwigsburg =

- Ludwigsburg, Baden-Württemberg
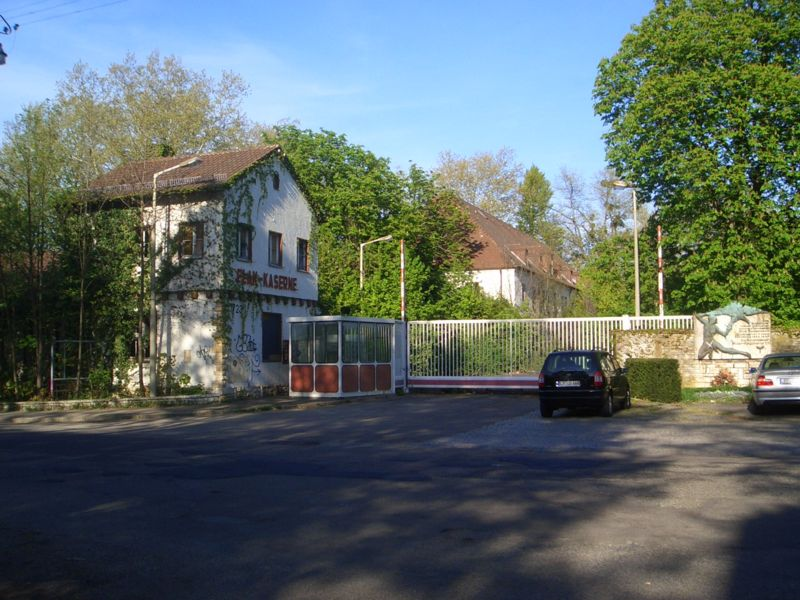
- The main gate, 2007

Site information
- Type: Military barracks
- Controlled by: (Germany) Bundeswehr; United States Army

Location
- Ludwigsburg, Germany
- Location within Germany
- Coordinates: 48.89722°N 9.22139°E

Site history
- Built: 1935–37
- Built by: German Army
- In use: 1937 – 1991

Garrison information
- Garrison: 1988 - 1992 42nd Medical Company (Ambulance)
- Occupants: Flak-Regiment 25; 4th Transportation Battalion

Flak-Kaserne Ludwigsburg was a military barracks, originally belonging to the German Army, and later occupied by the United States Army. It lies in the city of Ludwigsburg, in south-west Germany near Stuttgart.

== History ==
=== Pre-war ===
Construction began in late 1935, and by early 1937 members of anti-aircraft unit Flak-Regiment 25 began to occupy the 19 ha (47-acre) site. First to be completed were the barracks and a parade ground. The official opening ceremony took place on 12 September 1936 in the presence of Oberst Kolb (commander of the regiment), Oberst Heilingbrunner, the Bürgermeister of Ludwigsburg Dr. Karl Frank, and other guests. There was a military flypast, and a show was staged in the gymnasium, which included appearances by Zarah Leander and Ilse Werner.

=== Post-war ===
In April 1945, French and American troops occupied Ludwigsburg and the barracks commander surrendered. After initial skirmishes the French withdrew from the city, and control of the town was in the hands of Captain (later Major) John Lindsay as head of the American military government.

From 1945 until 1948, the Flak-Kaserne was used as an internment camp by the U.S. Army and designated I.C. 74. Among the many leading Nazis held there were the former Obergruppenführer Prince August Wilhelm of Prussia, and Ministers Richard Walther Darré and Lutz Graf Schwerin von Krosigk. Between 1948 and 1950 the barracks served as camp for displaced Germans.

From 1950 the U.S. Army occupied the barracks, and it served as the headquarters of the 4th Transportation Battalion, and later the 42nd Medical Company. The U.S. Army left the site in 1992, and ownership was returned to the German Federal government.

=== Redevelopment ===
After 1992 the barracks remained empty, overgrown and vandalized.

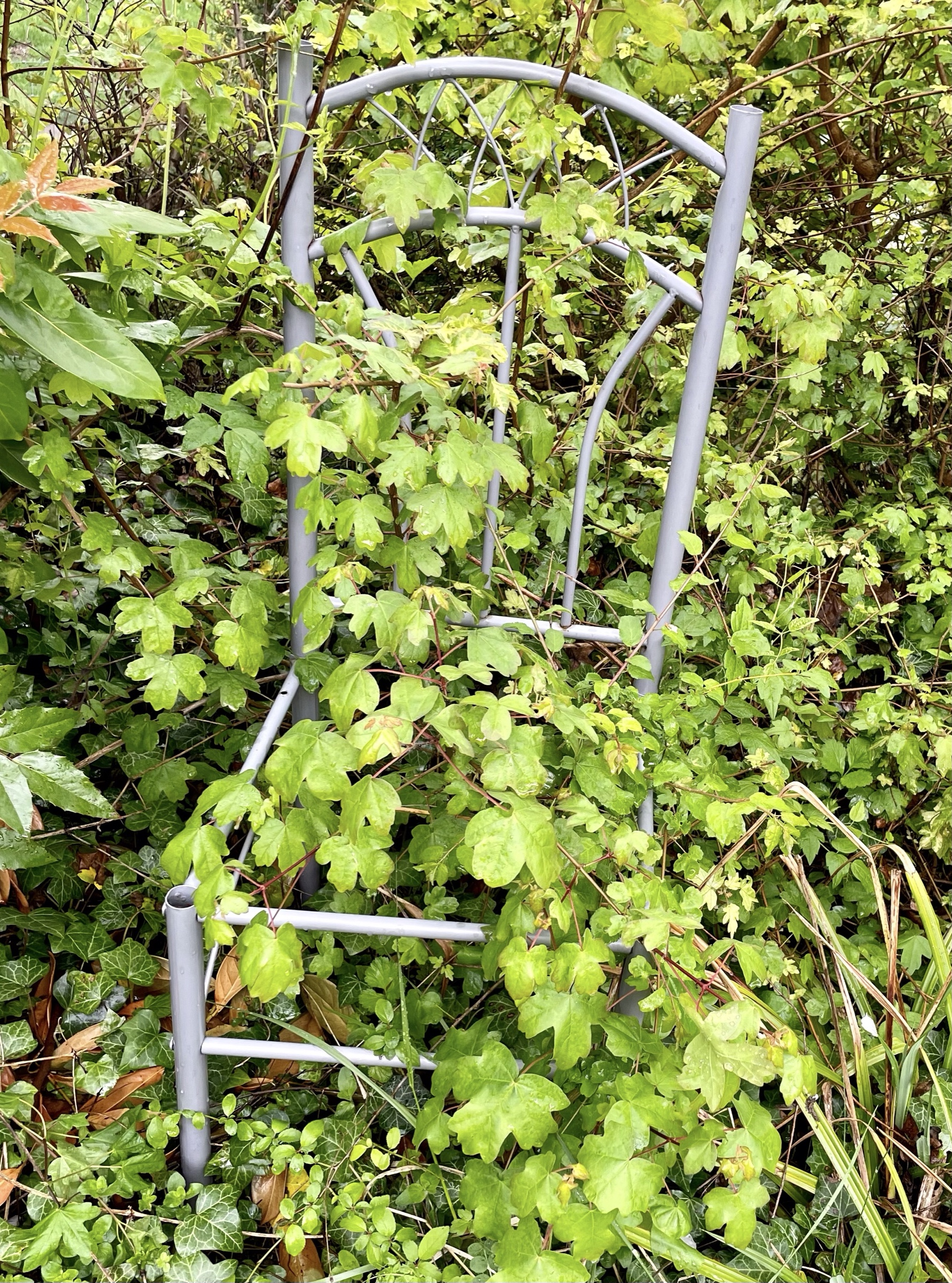
Flak-Kaserne Ludwigsburg, 2007. Metal Chair.

Parts of the site were used as a parking lot for truck trailers, and as a training ground for the police.

In 2007, after many years of negotiations with the Bundesanstalt für Immobilienaufgaben ("Federal Real Estate Agency") the city of Ludwigburg bought the site for approximately €8.25 million, and created a new housing development, the Hartenecker Höhe. After decontamination, housing for 1,600 people was built, and the first residents arrived in late 2009. All that remains of the former barracks are the gymnasium (now a kindergarten), the officers mess (now an apartment building), the guard house (now a cafe) and the main gate.

On September 13, 2015, the unveiling of the memorial plaque took place on the former exit of the Kaserne. The Mayor of Ludwigsburg and many former US Soldiers were attending the ceremonial. The memorial plaque has the following engraving: „In honor an grateful remembrance of the soldiers of the United States Army who served at Flakkaserne, Ludwigsburg, from 1950 to 1991.“
