= K.St.V. Askania-Burgundia =

Roman Catholic fraternity in Germany

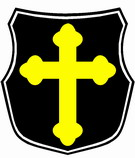
- Founded: 1853; 173 years ago Berlin
- Type: Studentenverbindung
- Affiliation: KV
- Status: Active
- Emphasis: Catholic
- Scope: Local
- Pillars: Religion, Science, and Friendship
- Chapters: 1
- Headquarters: Pücklerstrasse 24; Berlin-Dahlem 14195; Germany
- Website: www.ask-bg.de/index.php

Katholischer Studentenverein Askania-Burgundia (Catholic Students Society Askania-Burgundia), also known as K.St.V. Askania-Burgundia, is a Roman Catholic student society in Germany. It is the founding fraternity of the Kartellverband katholischer deutscher Studentenvereine (KV). It is a Catholic Studentenverbindung. The headquarters of Askania-Burgundia are located in Berlin, Germany. Based on the Roman Catholic faith, Askania-Burgundia strictly refuses academic fencing. Its members do not wear couleur. Askania-Burgundia's principles are religio (religion), scientia (science), and amicitia (friendship).

== History ==
Georg von Hertling (a university student who later became imperial German chancellor) founded Askania-Burgundia in 1853. The root of the fraternity was a Catholic academic reader circle. During the German Kulturkampf (literally, "culture struggle") in the late 19th century the fraternity became an important meeting point for Catholic students in Berlin.

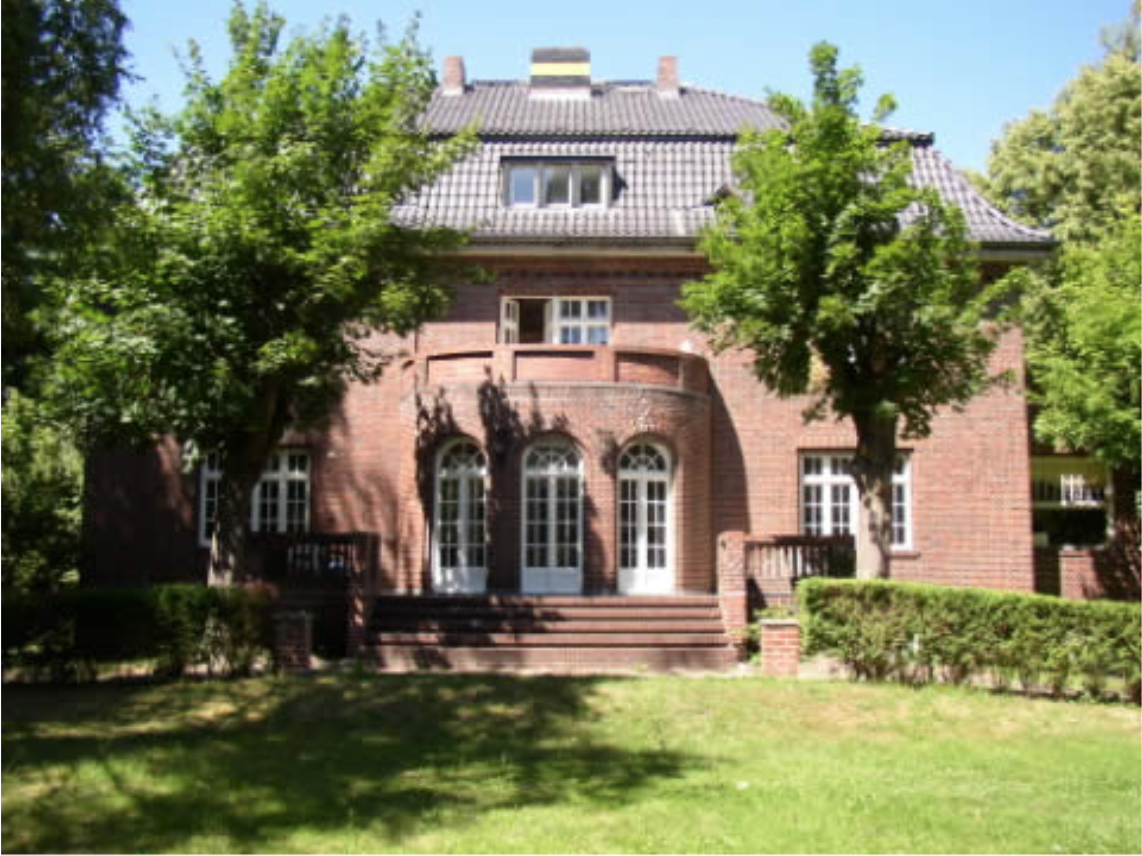
House in Berlin-Dahlem

Askania-Burgundia's house and headquarters was built in 1927. It is located at Pücklerstrasse 24, 14195 Berlin-Dahlem, Germany

== Symbols ==
The emblem of the community is a golden trefoil cross on a black ground. Its members do not wear couleur. Askania-Burgundia's principles are religio (religion), scientia (science), and amicitia (friendship).

== Members ==
Askania-Burgundia's members are all male. The membership is only open to baptized students of the universities in Berlin and Brandenburg. The requirements for the members with respect to capability of teamwork and in respect to academic accomplishment are rigid.

== Notable members ==
Among its members, there have been several German chancellors, such as Wilhelm Marx, Kurt Georg Kiesinger and Konrad Adenauer as well as industrial managers such as Heinrich Nordhoff, chief of the Volkswagen company, and several famous scientists.
