= Kartellverband =

German Catholic students' association

- KV
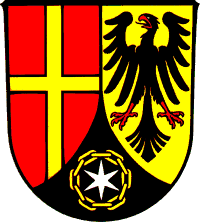
- Founded: November 29, 1865; 160 years ago Berlin, Germany
- Type: Umbrella
- Affiliation: Independent
- Status: Active
- Emphasis: Catholic German student societies
- Scope: International
- Motto: "With God for German honor"
- Pillars: Faith, Science, Friendship
- Colors: Black, White, and Red
- Members: 74 organizations active
- Headquarters: Hülsstraße 23; Marl 45772; Germany
- Website: www.kartellverband.de

Kartellverband katholischer deutscher Studentenvereine (KV, English: Cartel Association of Catholic German Student Societies) is a German umbrella organization for Catholic student organizations. KV was incorporated in Berlin, Germany in 1865, with principles are based on religion, scholarship, and friendship.. Its membership includes more than 70 active student organizations, primarily in Germany, but also in Austria, Belgium, and Switzerland. KV represents a collective membership of around 16,000 students.

== History ==
=== Before and during World War I, 1853–1918 ===
The process of forming Catholic students' corporations began in 1853, when several couleur-wearing ones (Farbentragende katholische Studentenverbindungen) independently prepared an inter-association group under the initial title Cartellverband der katholischen deutschen Studentenverbindungen; the organization suffered schism in its first year. In 1865, a successful new non-couleur-wearing alliance under the present name was incorporated at Berlin on the twelfth anniverssry of the incorporation of Katholische Leseverein.

The initial association consisted of five non-couleur-wearing student corporations (Nichtfarbentragende katholische Studentenvereine): the K.St.V. Askania-Burgundia Berlin, established November 29, 1853 as the Katholische Leseverein, at Humboldt-Universität, Berlin; the K.St.V. Unitas-Breslau, established March 4, 1863, at Universitas Wratislaviensis, Breslau, Lower Silesia (Wrocław, Lower Silesian Voivodeship, Poland, from 1945); the K.St.V. Arminia Bonn, established November 6, 1863, at Rheinische Friedrich-Wilhelms-Universität, Bonn, North Rhine-Westphalia; the K.St.V. Germania, established March 7, 1864, at Westfälische Wilhelms-Universität, Münster, North Rhine-Westphalia; and the K.St.V. Walhalla Würzburg, established 1864, at Julius-Maximilians-Universität, Würzburg, Franconia.

In 1865, the Kartellverband commenced its work in the intellectual, religious and cultural areas of the German society of the period. The same year saw the Kartellverband's first major adversity: a multilateral inquiry into the doctrine of Papal infallibility. The Cultural Struggle, a heavy burden on its member corporations, actually served to promote the Kartellverband to the point where, as of 1914, the Kartellverband had 51student corporation members.

=== Weimar Republic, 1919–1932 ===
After the Peace of Versailles, the Kartellverband's ranks swelled with returning war veterans, resulting in the establishment of numerous additional corporations including the Katholische Österreichere Studentenvereine at Vienna and Graz, Austria. By 1921, an Alumni Board (German: Philisterausschuß, lit. 'Philistine committee') was elected after much debate within the Kartellverband, the individual Studentenvereine having established alumni's unions (Philistervereine) from 1913; the principle of federal life governed the Board. From 1930, membership declined as a consequence of the economic crisis that started with the mass stock sell-off at the New York Stock Exchange on October 29, 1929.

=== Nazi Regime, 1932–1945 ===
In March 1933, the Catholic bishops' resistance to the Nazi power grab weakened, and with it the will of the Studentenvereine to fight; the conclusion of the Reichskonkordat finished both off. Several corporations resisted, but were unable to halt the Kartellverband's collapse.

At the start of the Nazi regime, the corporations that were not prohibited were held for enlargement of their directors' boards. On September 1, 1933, at Frankfurt am Main, the Kartellverband was merged into the Ring katholischer deutscher Burschenschaften, despite objections from within, over the fact that a "color-carrying" and a "non-coleur-wearing" board had been combined; and from without, as the Deutsche Burschenschaft accused the RKDB of name infringement. The merger did not last long.

On July 10, 1933, the Studentenvereine in Austria severed ties with the Alliance on account of Austro-German tensions at the time, and incorporated an Österreichischer Cartellverband; the Kartellverband katholischer nichtfarbentragender akademischer Vereinigungen Österreichs incorporated on July 22 of the same year. Both Kartellverbände were forcibly decorporated on June 20, 1938, in the wake of the Nazi invasion and annexation of Austria (Anschluß Österreiches). The Kartellverband itself was forcibly decorporated in 1938 under the Third Reich's Verbot der Korporationsverbände.

=== After 1945 ===
The Alliance was reincorporated immediately after the end of the Nazi regime. Many Kartellverband alumni were directly involved in the fledgeling government of the Federal Republic of Germany, newly incorporated in 1946, emerging at all Minister positions and the Federal Chancellory (Bundeskanzleramt). At the Constitutional Court (Bundesverfassungsgericht), the Kartellverband was involved in the establishment of the liberal democratic basic order (Freiheitlich-demokratische Grundordnung), with Gebhard Müller as Chief Justice and Ernst-Wolfgang Böckenförde and Paul Kirchhof as Associate Justices.

From 1968, the Kartellverband reorganized from the ground up, the primary innovation being the capacities of the member Students' Unions, in certain cases composed of non-Catholic Christians.

The Kartellverband is a member of the Labor-Congress of Catholic Associations (Arbeitsgemeinschaft katholischer Verbände) and the Labor-Congress of Catholic Student Associations (Arbeitsgemeinschaft katholischer Studentenverbände).

== Symbols ==
Kartellverband's motto is "With God for German honor", but has not been used since the end of World War II. The Kartellverband holds to the principles or pillars of Faith, Science, and Friendship The Kartellverband of Austria additionally holds to the principle of Love of Home-Nation.

H. Kranforst designed the Kartellverband coat of arms, which was adopted in 1907. It uses the colors black, white, and red, which were the colors of the German Empire at the time. Its shield featured a cross in the upper left corner to symbolize the principle of faith, an eagle in the upper right corner, and a six-pointed star to symbolize science at the bottom, surrounded by a chain of friendship. Above the shield was a helmet. In 1995, the coat of arms was updated to include just the shield.

Kartellverband adopted its pin in 1924. The pin consists of the association's letters, with the letter "K" lying sideways above a large "V". In 1995, the association adopted a new logo based on the pin. Kartellverband colors are black, white, and red, which were the colors of the German Empire when the association adopted its coat of arms.

== Member organizations ==
Most Kartellverband members have names starting with "Catholic student fraternity" or "K.St.V." for short. Following is a list of Kartellverband members, with active organizations indicated in bold and inactive groups in italics. Members may no longer have collegiate members, but still have an active alumni group.

KV number	Name	Symbols	Coat of arms	Colors	Charter date and range	Location	Motto	Status in KV	Ref.
1	**K.St.V. Askania-Burgundia**	Ask-Bg!		Black, Gold, Black	November 29, 1853	Berlin, Germany	Fortes in fide, in adversis constantia! Crux Christi nostra corona!	Active	(Note: Formed from the merger of KStV Burgundia)
2	**K.St.V. Unitas-Breslau**	Un!		Red, White, Green	March 4, 1863	Cologne, North Rhine-Westphalia, Germany	Per aspera ad astra!	Active	
3	**K.St.V. Arminia**	Arm!		Orange, White, Blue	November 6, 1863	Bonn, North Rhine-Westphalia, Germany	Treu, frei!, 'Loyal, straightforward!'	Active	
4	**K.St.V. Germania Münster**	Gm!		Red, White, Black	March 7, 1864	Münster, North Rhine-Westphalia, Germany	Deum cole, litteris stude, amicos fove!	Active	
5	**K.St.V. Walhalla**	Wh!		Red, White, Black	November 14, 1864	Würzburg, Bavaria, Germany	Pro fide et Patria!, 'For Loyalty and Fatherland'	Active	
6	**K.St.V. Ottonia**	Ott!		White, Red, Gold	January 28, 1866	Munich, Bavaria, Germany	Der Wahrheit zum Schutz, der Lüge zum Trutz!, 'To protect the truth, to defy lies!'	Active	
7	**K.St.V. Laetitia**	Lt!		Black, Gold, White	November 27, 1866	Karlsruhe, Baden-Württemberg, Germany	In serenis laetitia, in adversis constantia, in omnibus fiducia!, 'Cheerful in good times, steadfast in bad times, always optimistic!'	Active	
8	**K.St.V. Winfridia**	Wf!		Light Blue, White, Red	January 20, 1870	Göttingen, Lower Saxony, Germany	In fide virtus et amicitia!, 'In faith, virtue, and friendship!'	Active	
9	**K.St.V. Alamannia**	Al!		Black, White, Blue	January 31, 1871	Tübingen, Baden-Württemberg, Germany	In fide firmitas!, 'Steadfast in loyalty'	Active	
10	**K.St.V. Carolingia**	Car!		Silver, Blue, Gold	November 10, 1871	Aachen, North Rhine-Westphalia, Germany	Graviter severa, hilariter serena!	Active	
11	**K.St.V. Palatia**	Pal!		Red, Gold, Sky Blue	November 4, 1872	Heidelberg, Baden-Württemberg, Germany	Fides Turris Nostra!, 'Faith is our tower'	Active	
12	**K.St.V. Normannia-Greifswald**	N.M!		Black, Gold, Red	January 15, 1873	Mainz, Rhineland-Palatinate, Germany	Nec aspera terrent!, 'Even adversity doesn’t deter us”'	Active	
13	**K.St.V. Erwinia**	Erw!		Blue, White, Gold	May 4, 1873	Munich, Bavaria, Germany	Nunquam retrorsum!, 'Never look back!'	Active	
14	K.St.V. Teutonia-Rudelsburg	Tt		Blue, White, Green	July 28, 1874	Marburg, Hesse, Germany	Furchtlos und treu!, 'Fearless and loyal!'	Inactive	(Note: Merged with Rudelsburg Jena on February 27, 1954 to form KStV Teutonia-Rudelsburg zu Marburg/Lahn, which in turn merged into KStV Thuringia zu Marburg.)
15	**K.St.V. Frankonia-Strasbourg**	Frk!		Red, White, Gold	June 26, 1875	Frankfurt, Hesse, Germany	Nec Aspera Terrent!, 'Against all hardship!'	Active	
16	**K.St.V. Normannia**	Nm-W!		Red, White, Green	January 11, 1876	Würzburg, Bavaria, Germany	Deo et amico!	Active	
17	**AV Gothia**	Gth!		Green, White, Gold	April 30, 1876	Hanover, Lower Saxony, Germany	Suscipere et finire!, 'Suscipate and to End!'	Active	
18	K.St.V. Borussia-Königsberg			Black, White, Green	November 11, 1875	Cologne, North Rhine-Westphalia, Germany		Inactive	
19	**K.St.V. Ermland (Warmia)**	Erm		Red, White, Green	1863–1876; 1926–1934; December 1, 1963	Munich, Bavaria, Germany	Consilio et virtute!	Active	
20	**K.St.V. Brisgovia**	Bsg		Green, Gold, Red	May 10, 1880	Freiburg im Breisgau, Baden-Württemberg, Germany	In virtute honos!	Active	
21	**K.St.V. Alemannia**	Ale!		Blue, White, Black	November 27, 1881	Munich, Bavaria, Germany	In unitate robur!, 'We will prevail in unity!'	Active	
22	**K.St.V. Thuringia**	Th!		Red, White, Red	May 11, 1881	Marburg, Hesse, Germany	Pro Deo et Patria!, 'For God and Fatherland'	Active	
23	K.St.V. Saxonia	Sx		Green, Gold, Black	July 14, 1883	Munich, Bavaria, Germany	Pro Deo et Patria!, 'For God and Fatherland'	Inactive	(Note: Formed by 24 former members of K.St.V. Ottonia.)
24	KAV Baltia	Blt		Green, White, Red	July 3, 1886	Kiel, Schleswig-Holstein, Germany	Amico fides, Patriae vita, Deo omnia!	Inactive	
25	**K.St.V. Rhenania**	Rh-E!		Blue, White, Black	July 16, 1892	Erlangen, Bavaria, Germany	Gott zur Ehr, dem Freund zur Wehr!, 'To the glory of God, for the protection of our friend!'	Active	
26	**K.St.V. Rheno-Frankonia**	Rh-F!		Green, White, Gold	February 18, 1892	Würzburg, Bavaria, Germany	Treu, frei!, 'Loyal, free!'	Active	
27	**K.St.V. Albertia**	Alb!		Red, White, Gold	December 17, 1892	Munich, Bavaria, Germany	Furchtlos und treu!, 'Fearless and loyal!'	Active	
28	**K.St.V. Nassovia**	Nss!		Blue, Orange, Blue	January 11, 1895	Giessen, Hesse, Germany	In Treue fest!, 'Steadfast in loyalty!'	Active	
29	**K.St.V. Rhenania**	Rh-I!		Green, White, Blue	May 27, 1895	Innsbruck, Tyrol, Austria	In fide firmitas!, 'Steadfast in loyalty'	Active	
30	**K.St.V. Germania-Hohentwiel**	Gm-Ho!		Red, Gold, Blue	June 21, 1897	Freiburg im Breisgau, Baden-Württemberg, Germany	Felsenfest!, 'Rock solid!'	Active	(Note: Founded in the summer semester of 1912 through the division of Brisgovia; merged in March 1919 with Germania, which had existed since 1897.)
31	K.St.V. Ripuaria	Rp		Green, Gold, Red	June 10, 1899	Heidelberg, Baden-Württemberg, Germany	Concordia crescimus!	Inactive	
32	K.St.V. Frisia	Fs		Black, Gold, Blue	January 18, 1900	Bonn, North Rhine-Westphalia, Germany	Luctor et emergo!	Inactive	
33	K.St.V. Bavaria	Bv		White, Blue, White	January 29, 1900	Freiburg im Breisgau, Baden-Württemberg, Germany	In Treue fest!, 'Steadfast in loyalty!'	Inactive	
34	**K.St.V. Cimbria**	CB!		Gold, Black, White	February 9, 1901	Münster, North Rhine-Westphalia, Germany	Tapfer und treu!, 'Brave and loyal!'	Active	(Note: Created by the division of Germania.)
35	**K.St.V. Markomannia**	Mk!		Black, Gold, Red	February 9, 1901 – May 25, 1936; October 25, 1947	Münster, North Rhine-Westphalia, Germany	Viriliter age!	Active	(Note: Merged with KStV Tuiskonia on April 15, 1934.)
36	**K.St.V. Franko-Borussia-Breslau**	Fr-B!		Black, White, Gold	February 11, 1902 – May 17, 1936; July 29, 1950	Göttingen, Lower Saxony, Germany	In unitate firmitas, 'Firm in unity'	Active	(Note: Formed from the merger of K.St.V. Eresburg and K.St.V. Franko-Silesia on January 1, 1987.)
37	K.St.V. Hansea-Halle	HS		Light Green, Red, White	June 11, 1900	Münster, North Rhine-Westphalia, Germany	Frei und treu!, 'Free and loyal!'	Inactive	
38	K.St.V. Tuiskonia-Monasteria	Tsk-Mon		Red, Gold, Blue	July 31, 1902 – 1939	Münster, North Rhine-Westphalia, Germany	In Treue fest!, 'Steadfast in loyalty!'	Inactive	(Note: Merger of Tuiskonia and Monasteria.)
39	K.St.V. Guestphalia-Berlin	Gst		White, Red	December 12, 1902	Frankfurt, Hesse, Germany	Contra torrentem.	Inactive	
40	AV Rheno-Guestphalia			Violet, White, Moss Green	February 6, 1903	Kiel, Schleswig-Holstein, Germany		Inactive	(Note: Is now a member of Cartellverband.)
41	**K.St.V. Moenania-Starkenburg**	Moe-Stg!		Red, White, Blue	June 5, 1901 – 1936; 1948	Darmstadt, Hesse, Germany	Deus, honor, patria!	Active	(Note: Formed from the merger of K.St.V. Moenania and its daughter corporation K.St.V. Starkenburg on April 20, 1985.)
42	**K.St.V. Vandalia**	Vd!		Black, White, Blue	January 27, 1904	Bonn, North Rhine-Westphalia, Germany	Furchtlos und treu!, 'Fearless and loyal!'	Active	
43	K.St.V. Rheno-Bavaria			Red, White, Light Blue	April 21, 1903	Munich, Bavaria, Germany		Inactive	
44	**K.St.V. Wiking**	Wk!		Garnet, Gold, Garnet	July 11, 1904	Aachen, North Rhine-Westphalia, Germany	Virtus et veritas!	Active	
45	**KAV Rheno-Nicaria**	Rh-N!		Moss Green, Pink	July 10, 1903	Stuttgart, Baden-Württemberg, Germany	In Treue fest!, 'Steadfast in loyalty!'	Active	
46	KStV Staufia-Strasbourg	Stf		Blue, Gold, Black	October 29, 1904	Frankfurt, Hesse, Germany	In virtute robur!	Inactive	
47	**K.St.V. Rheno-Merovingia**	Rh-Mv!		Green, Red, Green	October 20, 1904	Bochum, North Rhine-Westphalia, Germany	Semper ad Lucem!, 'Always towards the light!'	Active	(Note: Absorbed of KStV Rheinland)
48	**K.St.V. Pruthenia**	Pr!		Black, White, Blue	September 21, 1904	Aachen, North Rhine-Westphalia, Germany	Candide et sincère!	Active	
49	**K.St.V. Alania-Breslau**	Aln!		Light Blue, Silver, Black	December 14, 1905	Aachen, North Rhine-Westphalia, Germany	Für Wahrheit und Recht!, 'For truth and justice!'	Active	(Note: Formed by the division of Unitas-Breslau.)
50	K.St.V. Visurgia			Red, Green, Black	December 7, 1907	Hannover, Lower Saxony, Germany		Inactive	
51	**K.St.V. Osning**	Osg!		Black, Gold, Blue	December 14, 1908	Westphalian Wilhelms University	Ahnentugend unsere Stärke!, 'Ancestral virtue is our strength!'	Active	
52	**K.St.V. Rheinpfalz**	Rhein!		Black, Blue, Silver	May 10, 1910 – August 1914; November 1922	Cologne, North Rhine-Westphalia, Germany	Durch Nacht zum Licht!, 'Through night to light!'	Active	(Note: Founded in Strasbourg in 1910 as Rheno-Frankonia, it was suspended in August 1914. It was re-established in Cologne in November 1922 as Rheinpfalz and merged with KStV Balmung on January 10, 1925.)
53	**K.St.V. Zollern-Breslau**	Zo!		Silver, Black	July 30, 1910	Karlsruhe, Baden-Württemberg, Germany	Allzeit treu zu Bund und Reich!, 'Always loyal to the League and the Reich!'	Active	(Note: On May 21, 1934, it merged with Franko-Silesia to form Alania-Breslau. It was reactivated by splitting Laetitia on July 2, 1949.)
54	**K.St.V. Rheno-Palatia**	Rh-P!		White, Green, White	February 3, 1911 – 1936; March 21, 1951 – c. 1968; 1980	Freiburg im Breisgau, Baden-Württemberg, Germany	Einig! Treu!, 'United! Loyal!'	Active	(Note: Formed when fourteen members left K.St.V. Brisgovia.)
55	**K.St.V. Semnonia-Berlin**	Smn!		Green, White, Black	February 14, 1911	Osnabrück, Lower Saxony, Germany	In virtute robur!, 'In virtue lies strength!'	Active	
56	K.St.V. Karolingia	Kar		Gold, Black, Green	June 12, 1912	Munich, Bavaria, Germany	Fortiter in re, suaviter in modo!	Inactive	(Note: Created by the division of Alemannia.)
57	**K.St.V. Suevia**	SV!		Green, White, Red	July 4, 1904	Cologne, North Rhine-Westphalia, Germany	Omnes unum!	Active	
58	**K.St.V. Ravensberg**	Ra!		Green, Gold, Red	May 5, 1919 – May 17, 1936; 1947	Münster, North Rhine-Westphalia, Germany	Vorwärts, aufwärts!, 'Forward, upward!'	Active	
59	K.St.V. Westmark	Wst		White, Violet, White	May 17, 1919	Bonn, North Rhine-Westphalia, Germany	Stark, frei!, 'Strong, free!'	Inactive	(Note: The alumni association is still a member of the KV.)
60	**K.St.V. Agilolfia**	Agl!			October 5, 1908	Regensburg, Bavaria, Germany	In Treue fest!, 'Steadfast in loyalty!'	Active	
61	**K.St.V. Albingia**	Albi!		Black, White, Red	May 16, 1919	Hamburg, Germany	Fides turris nostra!	Active	
62	**K.St.V. Rheno-Borussia**	Rh-Bor!		Black, Gold, Green	August 4, 1896 – 1936; 1947	Poppelsdorf Academy, Bonn, North Rhine-Westphalia, Germany	Mit Gott immer weiter!, 'With God, always onward!'	Active	
63	**K.St.V. Nibelung**	Nbg!		Gold, White, Lilac	November 14, 1919	Cologne, North Rhine-Westphalia, Germany	Gemeinsam stark und treu!, 'Strong and loyal together!'	Active	
64	**K.St.V. Grotenburg-Lusatia**	Gro-Lu!			February 15, 1921	Aachen, North Rhine-Westphalia, Germany	Gemeinsam stark!, 'Stronger together!'	Active	(Note: Formed from the merger of KStV Saxo-Lusatia and KStV Saxo-Lusatia-Dresden on November 18, 1979.)
65	**K.St.V. Winfridia**	Wf-K!		Green, Gold, Red	May 2, 1913	Cologne, North Rhine-Westphalia, Germany	Treu und wahr!, 'True and faithful!'	Active	
66	K.St.V. Lichtenstein	Li			November 19, 1919 – 1966; 1992	Erfurt, Thuringia, Germany	Treu und wahr, allezeit!, 'Faithful and true, always!'	Inactive	(Note: Founded in Freising in 1919 and reactivated in Erfurt in 1992. When active members were suspended in 1967, and some alumni founded the fraternity now known as CStV Lichtenstein zu Freising.)
67	**K.St.V. Cheruscia**	Cher!		Black, White, Blue	November 12, 1899 – c. 1914; 1921–1933; 1948	Braunschweig, Lower Saxony, Germany	Vorwärts, aufwärts!, 'Forward, upward!'	Active	
68	**K.St.V. Isaria**	Is!		Light Green, White, Light Blue	February 5, 1921	Freising, Bavaria, Germany	Für Gott und Vaterland!, 'For God and Fatherland!'	Active	
69	**K.St.V. Franko-Silesia-Breslau et Eresburg**	Fr-S+Ebg!		Black, White, Yellow	July 17, 1921	Münster, North Rhine-Westphalia, Germany	In unitate firmitas!, 'Firm in unity!'	Active	(Note: Formed from the merger of K.St.V. Franko-Silesia-Breslau and K.St.V. Eresburg on January 1, 1987.)
70	**AV Glückauf-Salia**	GLC-Sa!		Red, Black, White, Red	May 19, 1919	Clausthal-Zellerfeld, Lower Saxony, Germany	Hic Amicitia!	Active	(Note: Resulted from a merger with KStV Salia on June 3, 1949; merged with KDStV Ostland on June 30, 1997. Also a member of the Cartellverband.)
71	K.St.V. Deutschmeister	Dm		Gold, Black, White	July 19, 1921 – xxxx ?	Vienna, Vienna, Austria	Frustra vivit, qui nemini prodest!	Inactive	
72	**K.St.V. Eckart**	Eck!		Black, White, Light Blue	July 24, 1922	Mannheim, Baden-Württemberg, Germany	Furchtlos und treu!, 'Fearless and loyal!'	Active	
73	K.St.V. Südmark	Süd		Gold, White, Blue	1892–1922	Munich, Bavaria, Germany	Fide lux scientiae!	Inactive	
74	**AKV Tirolia**	Tir!		Green, White, Gold	December 6, 1893	Innsbruck, Tyrol, Austria	In Unitate Virtus!, 'In unity, virtue'	Active	
75	K.St.V. Rheno-Saxonia	Rh-S		Moss Green, Gold, Lilac	June 5, 1924	Munich, Bavaria, Germany	Dem Freunde treu und treu dem Vaterland!, 'True to our friends and true to our Fatherland!'	Inactive	
76	K.St.V. Flamberg	Flg		Black, White, Black	November 1, 1924	Bonn, North Rhine-Westphalia, Germany	Ich dien!, 'I serve!'	Inactive	(Note: Has been without active members since its refounding in October 2007.)
77	K.St.V. Teutoburg	Ttg		Gold, White, Moss Green	1900–1919	Paderborn, North Rhine-Westphalia, Germany	Vitam impendere vero!	Inactive	
78	**AV Winfridia**	Wi!		Blue, White, Gold	June 28, 1907	Graz, Styria, Austria	Mit Gott fürs Volk!, 'With God for the People!'	Active	
79	**K.St.V. Alsatia**	Als!		Black, White, Green	May 13, 1925 – 1935; 1947	Cologne, North Rhine-Westphalia, Germany	Pro Deo et Patria!	Active	
80	**K.St.V. Ludovicia**	Lu!		Blue, White, Green	January 25, 1899	Augsburg, Bavaria, Germany	Gerecht und beharrlich!, 'Just and persistent!'	Active	
81	**K.St.V. Neuenfels**	Nf!		Red, White, Red	February 12, 1927	Freiburg im Breisgau, Baden-Württemberg, Germany	Im Leben wahr, dem Ganzen treu!, 'True in life, faithful to the whole!'	Active	
82	**K.St.V. Abraxas-Rheinpreussen**	Abx!		Black, Silver, Green	May 31, 1927	Dresden, Saxony, Germany	Ex oriente Lux.	Active	(Note: Formed from the merger of KStV Abraxas Saxonia and KStV Rheinpreußen-Berlin-Clausthal on April 5, 2003.)
83	K.St.V. Greifenstein	Grei		Red, White, Red	June 28, 1927 – xxxx ?	Vienna, Vienna, Austria	Mit voller Kraft!	Inactive	
84	K.St.V. Tannenberg-Königsberg Berlin	Ta		Black, Silver, Black	November 12, 1927	Berlin, Germany	Die Treue ist das Mark der Ehre!, 'Loyalty is the hallmark of honor!'	Inactive	
85	**K.St.V. Rechberg**	Rbg!		Silver, Black, Silver	December 18, 1927	Tübingen, Baden-Württemberg, Germany	Nova et vetera!, 'New and Old'	Active	
86	K.St.V. South Tyrol	KFS		White, Red, White	May 1, 1928	Innsbruck, Tyrol, Austria		Inactive	
87	K.St.V. Saxo-Rugia	Sx-Ru			June 8, 1928	Munich, Bavaria, Germany	Cum amico pro fide et patria!	Inactive	
88	**AKV Aggstein**	Agg!		Black, Silver, Black	April 27, 1928 – March 1938; 194x ?	Vienna, Vienna, Austria	Nie zurück!, 'Never Turning Back!'	Active	
89	K.St.V. Langemarck			Silver, Moss Green, Silver	February 1, 1929	Langemarck, West Flanders, Belgium		Inactive	
90	K.St.V. Merowingia-Bonn	Mw		White, Moss Green, Gold	June 5, 1926	Saarbrücken, Saarland, Germany	In Treue fest!, 'Steadfast in loyalty!'	Inactive	
91	K.St.V. Winfried	Win		Green, Gold, Violet	November 4, 1926	Mainz, Rhineland-Palatinate, Germany	Für Jugend und Vaterland!, 'For Youth and Fatherland!'	Inactive	
92	**K.St.V. Carolingia**	Car-F!		Blue, White, Black	May 19, 1929	Fribourg, La Sarine, Switzerland	Deo et amico!	Active	
93	K.St.V. Amelung			Silver, Black, Silver	January 20, 1930	Frankfurt, Hesse, Germany		Inactive	
94	K.St.V. Urach	Ur		Silver, Orange, Silver	June 27, 1905 – January 29, 1930	Freiburg im Breisgau, Baden-Württemberg, Germany	Treu, wahr!, 'Loyal, true!'	Inactive	
95	**AV Austria**	Ast!		Blue, Gold, Red	March 3, 1930	Graz, Styria, Austria	Für Glaube, Volk und Heimat!, 'For Faith, People and Homeland!'	Active	
96	K.St.V. Ketteler	Kett		Blue, Gold, Red	June 1, 1930	Bonn, North Rhine-Westphalia, Germany	Mit Gott für Jugend und Volk!, 'With God for Youth and People!'	Inactive	
97	**KATV Norica**	No!		Black, Red, Gold	May 26, 1930	Graz, Styria, Austria	Mit Gott für Volk und Vaterland!, 'With God for People and Fatherland!'	Active	
98	**K.St.V. Ostmark-Beuthen**	Ost!		Black, Yellow, Blue	June 20, 1930	Paderborn, North Rhine-Westphalia, Germany	Tapfer und treu!, 'Brave and Loyal!'	Active	
99	K.St.V. Weserhorst-Hann	Weho		Black, White, Green	February 13, 1930	Hann. Münden, Lower Saxony, Germany	Hie guet deutsch Weydwerk allewege!	Inactive	
100	**K.St.V. Mainfranken**	Ma!		Blue, Gold, Red	June 5, 1930 – 1936; February 17, 1947	Bamberg, Bavaria, Germany	Fides virtutis robur!	Active	
101	AV Prinz Eugene	PE			February 5, 1948	Vienna, Vienna, Austria		Inactive	
102	K.St.V. Ketteler	Kett		Black, Silver, Black	May 28, 1948	Mainz, Rhineland-Palatinate, Germany	Pro Deo et amico!	Inactive	(Note: Only the alumni association is still a member of the KV.)
103	**K.St.V. Kurpfalz**	Kur!		Black, Gold, Red	May 28, 1948	Mainz, Rhineland-Palatinate, Germany	Amico fides, patriae vita, Deo omnia!	Active	
104	K.St.V. Rhenania	Rh-D		Black, Silver, Green	July 28, 1948	Düsseldorf, North Rhine-Westphalia, Germany	Virtute et Exemplo!, 'Virtue and Example!'	Inactive	
105	**K.St.V. Arnulf**	Arn		Blue, White, Blue	November 15, 1949	Saarbrücken, Saarland, Germany	Pro Deo et Amico!	Active	
106	AV Erzherzog Karl	EK		Red, White, Red	October 18, 1949	Vienna, Vienna, Austria	Austria erit inorbe ultima!	Inactive	
107	AV Erzherzog Johann	EJ		Black, White, Black	January 1950	Graz, Styria, Austria		Inactive	
108	K.St.V. Montecuccoli			Blue, Red, Gold	1949–xxxx ?	Linz, Upper Austria, Austria		Inactive	
109	K.St.V. Alemannia			White, Blue, White	January 30, 1951	Basel, Switzerland		Inactive	
110	**AV Suevia**	Su!		Black, White, Blue	October 23, 1951	Graz, Styria, Austria	Treu, mutig, wahr!, 'Loyal, courageous, true!'	Active	
111	K.St.V. Collegium Austriacum				1951–xxxx ?	Vienna, Austria		Inactive	
112	K.St.V. Tauriskia Leoben			Black, Red, Green	March 20, 1952 – xxxx ?	Styria, Austria		Inactive	
113	**K.St.V. Burggraf**	Bf!		Gold, White, Red	May 17, 1954	Nuremberg, Bavaria, Germany	Wachsam, aufrecht und stark!, 'Alert, upright, and strong!'	Active	
114	K.St.V. Stauffenberg	Stfg		Black, Gold	January 25, 1958	Tübingen, Baden-Württemberg, Germany	Attempto!	Inactive	
115	K.St.V. Rosenstein	Ro		Blue, Gold	June 21, 1954	Schwäbisch Gmünd, Baden-Württemberg, Germany	Mit Gott für Jugend und Volk!, 'With God for Youth and People!'	Inactive	
116	K.St.V. Westfalia-Mazenod	WM		Gold, Red, White	January 16, 1958	Münster, North Rhine-Westphalia, Germany	Veritati	Inactive	
117	K.St.V. Hercynia			Black, Green, Red	May 1, 1959	Braunschweig, Lower Saxony, Germany		Inactive	(Note: Merged into: K.St.V. Cheruscia.)
118	K.St.V. Don Bosco	DB		Blue, Gold, Black	July 9, 1959	Essen, North Rhine-Westphalia, Germany	Parati ad communitatem!	Inactive	
119	K.St.V. Julius-Echter	JE		Burgundy, Gold, Black	July 19, 1960 – xxxx ?	Würzburg, Bavaria, Germany	Nec laudibus, nec timore!	Inactive	
120	K.St.V. Vineta	Vn		Black, Gold	January 20, 1961	Weingarten, Württemberg, Baden-Württemberg, Germany	Dienen dem Nächsten im Dienste unseres Herrn., 'Serving our Neighbor in the Service of our Lord.'	Inactive	
121	K.St.V. Nicolaus Cusanus	NC		Red, Silver, Green	January 31, 1961	Koblenz, Rhineland-Palatinate, Germany	Testes ignis.	Inactive	
122	K.St.V. Syburg	Sbg		Green, White, Red	1960–1961	Dortmund, North Rhine-Westphalia, Germany	Spe gaudentes.	Inactive	
123	**K.St.V. Egbert**	Ebt!		Blue, Gold, Red	July 14, 1960	Trier, Rhineland-Palatinate, Germany	Ab igne ignem!	Active	
124	K.St.V. Pascalia	Pc		Black, White, Gold	February 12, 1963	Landau, Rhineland-Palatinate, Germany	Semper honestum, ne quid nimis!	Inactive	
125	K.St.V. Wittekind	Wit		Blue, White, Red	January 30, 1963	Vechta, Lower Saxony, Germany	Nec laudibus, nec timor!	Inactive	
126	K.St.V. Montclair	Mc		Green, White, Green	1963	Saarbrücken, Saarland, Germany	Veritas in actio!	Inactive	
127	K.St.V. Paris-Lodron	PL		Red, White, Gold	July 3, 1965 – xxxx ?	Salzburg, Salzburg, Austria	Pacis servator!	Inactive	
128	K.St.V. Orania	Or-S		Orange, Blue	1967	Siegen, North Rhine-Westphalia, Germany	Für Wahrheit und Treue!, 'For Truth and Loyalty!'	Inactive	
129	K.St.V. Hrabanus Maurus	HM		Gold, Red, Blue	May 17, 1967	Hildesheim, Lower Saxony, Germany	Begegnung in Freundschaft., 'Meeting in Friendship.'	Inactive	
130	K.St.V. Leuchtenberg	Leu		Red, White, Blue	July 8, 1967	Regensburg, Bavaria, Germany	Für Ehre und Treue!, 'For Honor and Fidelity!'	Inactive	
131	K.St.V. Reichsstadt	Rei-U		White, Black, White	November 16, 1973	Ulm, Baden-Württemberg, Germany		Inactive	
132	**K.St.V. Andechs-Merania**	A-Me!		Black, Blue, Gold	December 6, 1977	Bayreuth, Bavaria, Germany	Gutes bewahren, nach Neuem streben!, 'Preserve what is good, strive for what is new!'	Active	
133	**AV Tassilo**	Tas		Green, White, Red	November 25, 1977	Linz, Upper Austria, Austria	Traditio et Progressio!	Active	
134	K.St.V. Boiotro	Boi		Black, Blue, Green	October 15, 1981	Passau, Lower Bavaria, Germany	Wer wagt, gewinnt!, 'Nothing ventured, nothing gained!'	Inactive	
135	K.St.V. Barbarossa-Kaiserslautern	Bar		Red, White, Blue	1986–xxxx ?	Munich, Bavaria, Germany	Gaudium et spes., 'Joy and Hope.'	Inactive	
136	K.St.V. Rupertia	Ru-Ke		Red, White, Blue	1987	Kempten, Bavaria, Germany		Inactive	
137	K.St.V. Urbano	Urb!		Yellow, White, Blue	May 8, 2010 – 20xx ?	Rome, Italy		Inactive	(Note: Currently has no active student members.)

== See also ==
- Students' union
- German Student Corps
