= List of member fraternities of the Cartellverband =

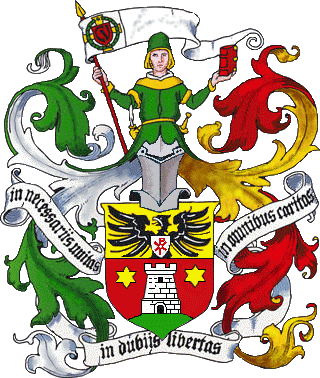

These fraternities are all members of the Cartellverband. Each fraternity is listed under its umbrella organization and is identified by a token consisting of the first letter of the umbrella organization and the membership number, based on the date of entry into the Cartellverband.

OM: free (open) member (without number)
AM: associated member (without number)
FM: former member (without number)

== Union of Catholic Austrian Student Fraternities ==
(German: Cartellverband der katholischen österreichischen Studentenverbindungen (ÖCV))

Following are the fraternities that belong the Union of Catholic Austrian Student Fraternities. The umbrella organizations are listed on a yellow background.

#	Fraternity	Letters	Founding date	Coat of arms	Colours	Location	Country	Zirkel	Joined CV/ÖCV
Ö	Cartellverband der katholischen österreichischen Studentenverbindungen	ÖCV	10 July 1933				Austria Italy		
Ö1	AV Austria Innsbruck	AIn	1864			Innsbruck	Austria		1864
Ö2	KaV Norica Wien	Nc	1883			Vienna	Austria		1883
Ö3	KÖHV Carolina Graz	Cl	1888			Graz	Austria		1889
Ö4	KÖHV Leopoldina Innsbruck	Le	1901			Innsbruck	Austria		1903
Ö5	KÖStV Austria Wien	AW	1876			Vienna	Austria		1906
Ö6	KÖStV Rudolfina Wien	Rd	1898			Vienna	Austria		1906
Ö7	KÖHV Nordgau Wien	NdW	1900			Vienna	Austria		1906
Ö8	KÖStV Kürnberg Wien	Kb	1900			Vienna	Austria		1906
Ö9	KAV Saxo-Bavaria Prag in Wien	S-B	1907			Vienna	Austria		1907
Ö10	KÖStV Traungau Graz	Trn	1908			Graz	Austria		1908
Ö11	KÖStV Nibelungia Wien	NbW	1908			Vienna	Austria		1908
Ö12	KÖHV Rugia Wien	Rg	1908			Vienna	Austria		1908
Ö13	AV Raeto-Bavaria Innsbruck	R-B	1908			Innsbruck	Austria		1908
Ö14	KaV Marco-Danubia Wien	M-D	1908			Vienna	Austria		1909
Ö15	KÖStV Aargau Wien	Aa	1908			Vienna	Austria		1909
Ö16	KÖHV Franco-Bavaria Wien	F-B	1908			Vienna	Austria		1909
Ö17	KÖHV Amelungia Wien	Am	1907			Vienna	Austria		1919
Ö18	KHV Welfia Klosterneuburg	Wl	1910			Klosterneuburg	Austria		1920
Ö19	KHV Babenberg Wien	BbW	1910			Vienna	Austria		1920
Ö20	KÖStV Babenberg Graz	BbG	1920			Graz	Austria		1920
Ö21	KÖHV Alpenland Wien	Alp	1921			Vienna	Austria		1921
Ö22	KÖStV Glückauf Leoben	GlL	1922			Leoben	Austria		1923
Ö23	KAV Rheno-Danubia Innsbruck	R-D	1927			Innsbruck	Austria		1927
Ö24	KAV Bajuvaria Wien	Baj	1920			Vienna	Austria		1929
Ö25	KÖHV Rheno-Juvavia Salzburg	R-J	1932			Salzburg	Austria		1932
Ö26	KAV Danubia Wien-Korneuburg	Dan	1907			Vienna	Austria		1932
Ö27	AV Vindelicia Innsbruck	Vi	1901			Innsbruck	Austria		1933
Ö28	KÖHV Alpinia Innsbruck	AlIn	1940			Innsbruck	Austria		1945
Ö29	ÖkaV Rhaeto-Danubia Wien	Rt-D	1930			Vienna	Austria		1946
Ö30	KÖHV Pannonia Wien	Pan	1932			Vienna	Austria		1948
Ö31	KÖHV Mercuria Wien	Merc	1947			Vienna	Austria		1950
Ö32	KÖHV Neostadia Wiener-Neustadt	Ne	1950			Wiener Neustadt	Austria		1954
Ö33	KÖStV Kristall Leoben	Kr	1954			Leoben	Austria		1955
Ö34	KÖHV Sängerschaft Waltharia Wien	Walth	1928			Vienna	Austria		1957
Ö35	KAV Austro-Peisonia Wien	A-P	1925			Vienna	Austria		1958
Ö36	KÖAV Albertina Graz	Alb	1961			Graz	Austria		1962
Ö37	ÖkaV Theresiana Wiener Neustadt	The	1960			Wiener Neustadt	Austria		1962
Ö38	KÖHV Rupertina Salzburg	Rp	1962			Salzburg	Austria		1966
Ö39	KaV Austro-Danubia Linz	A-D	1966			Linz	Austria		1966
Ö40	KÖaV Carinthia Klagenfurt	Ca	1972			Klagenfurt	Austria		1972
Ö41	KÖStV Veritas Baden	V-B	1976			Baden	Austria		1976
Ö42	KÖAV Floriana St. Pölten	FlP	1978			Sankt Pölten	Austria		1979
Ö43	KÖStV Severina Linz	Se	1982			Linz	Austria		1982
Ö44	KSHV Lodronia Salzburg	Lo	1927			Salzburg	Austria		1983
Ö45	AV Austro-Ferrea Eisenstadt	A-F	2001			Eisenstadt	Austria		2001
Ö46	KÖStV Erasmus Graz	ErG	2009			Graz	Austria		2009
Ö47	KÖHV Europa-Kopernika Graz	EKG	2011			Graz	Austria		2012
Ö48	KAV Sanctottensis Heiligenkreuz	SO	2011			Heiligenkreuz	Austria		2012
Ö49	KÖHV Maximiliana Linz	Ma	2014			Linz	Austria		2015
Ö50	ÖkaV Vitonia Krems	Vt	2016			Krems	Austria		2018
ÖAM	KÖStV Golania zu Arne	Gol	1994			Damascus	Syria		2001
ÖAM	AV Meinhardia Bozen	M-B	1999			Bozen	Italy		2000
ÖEM	KDStV Pflug Wien fusioniert mit KÖHV Franco-Bavaria Wien [1945]	Pf	1921			Vienna	Austria		
ÖEM	KDStV Laurinia Padua fusioniert mit AV Austria Innsbruck [1950]		1925			Padua	Italy		
ÖEM	KÖHV Liechtenstein Wien fusioniert mit KÖHV Alpenland Wien [1948]		1954			Vienna	Austria		
ÖEM	KÖAV Vindemia Feldkirch fusioniert mit AV Vindelicia Innsbruck [1981]	VF	1976			Feldkirch	Austria		

== Union of Catholic German Student Fraternities ==
(German: Cartellverband der katholischen deutschen Studentenverbindungen or Cartellverband (CV))

Following are the members of the Union of Catholic German Student Fraternities. The umbrella organizations are listed on a yellow background.

#	Fraternity	Letters	Founding date	Coat of arms	Colours	Location	Country	Zirkel	Joined CV/ÖCV
D	Cartellverband der katholischen Deutschen Studentenverbindungen	CV	1856				Germany Belgium; France; Hungary; Italy; Japan; Poland; Switzerland		
D1	K.D.St.V. Aenania München	Ae	1851			Munich	Germany		1856
D2	K.D.St.V. Winfridia (Breslau) Münster	Wf	1856			Münster	Germany		1856
D3	A.V. Guestfalia Tübingen	Gu	1859			Tübingen	Germany		1864
D4	K.D.St.V. Bavaria Bonn	BvBo	1844			Bonn	Germany		1865
D5	K.D.St.V. Markomannia Würzburg	Mm	1871			Würzburg	Germany		1871
D6	V.K.D.St. Saxonia Münster	Sx	1863			Münster	Germany		1871
D7	K.D.St.V. Hercynia Freiburg im Breisgau	Hr	1873			Freiburg im Breisgau	Germany		1873
D8	K.A.V. Suevia Berlin	Sv	1875			Berlin	Germany		1876
D9	V.K.D.St. Rhenania Marburg	Rh	1879			Marburg	Germany		1880
D10	K.D.St.V. Burgundia (Leipzig) Düsseldorf	BuL	1879			Düsseldorf	Germany		1880
D11	V.K.D.St. Hasso-Rhenania Gießen	H-RG	1883			Gießen	Germany		1883
D12	A.V. Silesia (Halle, Bonn) Bochum	Si	1881			Bochum	Germany		1883
D13	K.D.St.V. Badenia (Straßburg) Frankfurt	Bd	1882			Frankfurt	Germany		1884
D14	A.V. Palatia Göttingen	PG	1883			Göttingen	Germany		1884
D15	K.D.St.V. Arminia Heidelberg	ArH	1887			Heidelberg	Germany		1887
D16	K.D.St.V. Teutonia Freiburg im Uechtland	Tt	1890			Fribourg	Switzerland		1890
D17	K.D.St.V. Alemannia Greifswald und Münster	Ale	1891			Greifswald Münster	Germany		1891
D18	K.D.St.V. Gothia Erlangen	GEI	1892			Erlangen	Germany		1892
D19	K.D.St.V. Ferdinandea (Prag)	Fd	1886			Heidelberg	Germany		1896
D20	K.D.St.V. Vindelicia München	Vc	1897			Munich	Germany		1897
D21	A.V. Rheno-Guestfalia Kiel	R-GK	1897			Kiel	Germany		1897
D22	A.V. Tuisconia (Königsberg, Bonn) Landshut	TsK	1897			Landshut	Germany		1897
D23	K.D.St.V. Franconia Aachen	FcA	1898			Aachen	Germany		1898
D24	K.D.St.V. Rheno-Franconia München	R-F	1899			Munich	Germany		1899
D25	A.V. Alania Stuttgart	AlSt	1870			Stuttgart	Germany		1899
D26	K.D.St.V. Borusso-Saxonia Berlin	B-S	1899			Berlin	Germany		1899
D27	K.D.St.V. Ripuaria Freiburg im Breisgau	RFb	1899			Freiburg im Breisgau	Germany		1899
D28	CV-Verbindung Rheno-Palatia (Breslau) Mainz	R-P	1900			Mainz	Germany		1900
D29	A.V. Hansea (Berlin) Köln	Hs	1900			Cologne	Germany		1900
D30	A.V. Cheruscia Münster	ChM	1901			Münster	Germany		1901
D31	A.V. Zollern Münster	Z	1901			Münster	Germany		1901
D32	K.D.St.V. Normannia Karlsruhe	Nm	1890			Karlsruhe	Germany		1901
D33	K.D.St.V. Nassovia Darmstadt	Na	1896			Darmstadt	Germany		1901
D34	K.D.St.V. Thuringia Würzburg	Th	1902			Würzburg	Germany		1902
D35	A.V. Frisia Hannover	Fs	1902			Hanover	Germany		1902
D36	K.D.St.V. Sugambria (Jena) zu Göttingen	Sb	1902			Göttingen	Germany		1903
D37	K.D.St.V. Langobardia (München) Bayreuth	Lb	1903			Bayreuth	Germany		1903)
D38	A.V. Alsatia Münster	Als	1863			Münster	Germany		1904
D39	K.D.St.V. Baltia (Danzig) Aachen	Bl	1904			Aachen	Germany		1904
D40	K.D.St.V. Vandalia (Prag) München	Va	1905			Munich	Germany		1905
D41	K.D.St.V. Rappoltstein (Straßburg) Köln	Rap	1905			Cologne	Germany		1905
D42	K.D.St.V. Ripuaria Bonn	RBo	1863			Bonn	Germany		1905
D43	K.D.St.V. Gothia Würzburg	GW	1895			Würzburg	Germany		1905
D44	K.D.St.V. Staufia Bonn	St	1905			Bonn	Germany		1905
D45	K.D.St.V. Hohenstaufen Freiburg im Breisgau	Ho	1905			Freiburg im Breisgau	Germany		1905
D46	K.D.St.V. Moenania München	Moe	1907			Munich	Germany		1907
D47	K.D.St.V. Burgundia München	BuM	1899			Munich	Germany		1907
D48	K.D.St.V. Saxo-Silesia Hannover	S-S	1887			Hanover	Germany		1907
D49	K.D.St.V. Makaria (Berlin) Aachen	Mk	1896			Aachen	Germany		1907
D50	K.D.St.V. Arminia Freiburg im Breisgau	ArF	1874			Freiburg im Breisgau	Germany		1910
D51	K.D.St.V. Alania Bonn	AlBo	1905			Bonn	Germany		1910
D52	K.D.St.V. Frankonia-Czernowitz Erlangen	FcC	1891			Erlangen	Germany		1910
D53	K.D.St.V. Marchia (Breslau) Aachen	Mch	1910			Aachen	Germany		1910
D54	K.D.St.V. Sauerlandia Münster	Sd	1847			Münster	Germany		1911
D55	K.D.St.V. Novesia Bonn	Nv	1863			Bonn	Germany		1911
D56	K.D.St.V. Bavaria Berlin	BvBl	1898			Berlin	Germany		1911
D57	K.D.St.V. Tuiskonia München	TsM	1900			Munich	Germany		1911
D58	K.D.St.V. Palatia Marburg	PM	1907			Marburg	Germany		1911
D59	A.V. Cheruskia Tübingen	ChT	1902			Tübingen	Germany		1911
D60	K.D.St.V. Cheruscia Würzburg	ChW	1893			Würzburg	Germany		1912
D61	K.D.St.V. Falkenstein Freiburg im Breisgau	Fl	1913			Freiburg im Breisgau	Germany		1913
D62	K.D.St.V. Hasso-Nassovia Frankfurt	H-Na	1913			Frankfurt	Germany		1913
D63	K.D.St.V. Rheinland Köln	Rl	1913			Cologne	Germany		1919
D64	K.D.St.V. Wiking Hamburg	Wk	1919			Hamburg	Germany		1919
D65	K.D.St.V. Asgard (Düsseldorf) Köln	Asg	1914			Cologne	Germany		1919
D66	K.D.St.V. Niedersachsen Braunschweig	Nds	1920			Braunschweig	Germany		1920
D67	K.D.St.V. Kaiserpfalz Aachen	Ks	1920			Aachen	Germany		1920
D68	K.D.St.V. Saxo-Thuringia (Dresden, Aachen) Bochum	S-T	1920			Bochum	Germany		1920
D69	K.D.St.V. Ascania Bonn	Asc	1894			Bonn	Germany		1912
D70	A.V. Glückauf-Salia Clausthal-Zellerfeld	GIC	1920			Clausthal-Zellerfeld	Germany		1920
D71	K.D.St.V. Teuto-Rhenania Hannover	T-R	1920			Hanover	Germany		1920
D72	K.D.St.V. Rheinpfalz Darmstadt	Rpf	1921			Darmstadt	Germany		1921
D73	K.D.St.V. Schwarzwald Karlsruhe	Sch	1921			Karlsruhe	Germany		1921
D74	K.D.St.V. Nibelungia (Brünn) Darmstadt	NbB	1899			Darmstadt	Germany		1921
D75	K.D.St.V. Trifels München	Tfs	1922			Munich	Germany		1922
D76	K.D.St.V. Bergland (Freiberg) Aachen	Ber	1921			Aachen	Germany		1922
D77	K.D.St.V. Nordgau (Prag, Stuttgart) Koblenz	NdP	1921			Koblenz	Germany		1922
D78	K.D.St.V. Carolingia Hohenheim	Cg	1910			Stuttgart	Germany		1923
D79	K.D.St.V. Elbmark (Tetschen-Liebwerd) Duisburg	Elb	1922			Duisburg	Germany		1923
D80	K.D.St.V. Greiffenstein (Breslau) Frankfurt	Gf	1924			Frankfurt	Germany		1924
D81	K.D.St.V. Wildenstein Freiburg im Breisgau	Wld	1924			Freiburg im Breisgau	Germany		1924
D82	A.V. Rheinstein Köln	Rst	1925			Cologne	Germany		1925
D83	K.D.St.V. Churpfalz Mannheim	Cpf	1920			Mannheim	Germany		1925
D84	K.D.St.V. Rheno-Baltia Köln	R-BI	1922			Cologne	Germany		1926
D85	K.D.St.V. Borusso-Westfalia Bonn	B-W	1927			Bonn	Germany		1927
D86	F.A.V. Rheno-Guestfalia (Hann. Münden) Göttingen	R-GM	1927			Göttingen	Germany		1927
D87	K.D.St.V. Ostmark Nürnberg	Ost	1921			Nuremberg	Germany		1928
D88	K.D.St.V. Nordmark (Rostock, Karlsruhe) Essen	NdM	1929			Essen	Germany		1929
D89	K.D.St.V. Franco-Raetia Würzburg	F-Rt	1905			Würzburg	Germany		1930
D90	K.D.St.V. Radaspona (Regensburg) München	Rad	1922			Munich	Germany		1930
D91	K.D.St.V. Fredericia Bamberg	Fre	1913			Bamberg	Germany		1932
D92	K.D.St.V. Agilolfia Freising	Alf	1922			Freising	Germany		1935
D93	K.D.St.V. Rupertia Regensburg	Rup	1947			Regensburg	Germany		1950
D94	V.K.D.St. Hasso-Rhenania Mainz	H-RM	1946			Mainz	Germany		1950
D95	K.D.St.V. Rhenania-Moguntia Mainz	R-M	1949			Mainz	Germany		1950
D96	K.D.St.V. Angrivaria (Sarstedt, Hannover) Dortmund	Ang	1950			Dortmund	Germany		1952
D97	K.D.St.V. Guestfalo-Silesia zu Paderborn	G-S	1952			Paderborn	Germany		1952
D98	K.D.St.V. Carolus Magnus Saarbrücken	CM	1953			Saarbrücken	Germany		1953
D99	K.D.St.V. Moeno-Franconia Frankfurt	M-F	1955			Frankfurt	Germany		1955
D100	K.D.St.V. Alcimonia Eichstätt	Alm	1958			Eichstätt	Germany		1959
D101	K.D.St.V. Churtrier Trier	Ctr	1960			Trier	Germany		1961
D102	K.D.St.V. Saarland (Saarbrücken) Jena	Sld	1961			Jena	Germany		1961
D103	K.D.St.V. Algovia Augsburg	AlgA	1962			Augsburg	Germany		1963
D104	K.D.St.V. Vasgovia Landau	Vg	1960			Landau	Germany		1967
D105	K.D.St.V. Welfia Weingarten	WIW	1963			Weingarten	Germany		1968
D106	K.D.St.V. Merowingia Kaiserslautern	Mw	1970			Kaiserslautern	Germany		1970
D107	A.V. Suebo-Danubia Ulm	Sb-D	1973	Coat of Arms of the catholic student fraternity AV Suebo-Danubia Ulm	Colours of the catholic student fraternity AV Suebo-Danubia Ulm	Ulm	Germany	So-called "Zirkel" of the catholic student fraternity AV Suebo-Danubia Ulm	1973
D108	A.V. Widukind Osnabrück	Wd	1973			Osnabrück	Germany		1973
D109	K.D.St.V. Bodensee Konstanz	Bs	1974			Konstanz 1974	Germany		1974
D110	K.D.St.V. Bergisch-Thuringia Wuppertal	B-Th	1979			Wuppertal	Germany		1979
D111	K.D.St.V. Oeno-Danubia Passau	Oe-D	1979			Passau	Germany		1979
D112	A.V. Sparrenberg Bielefeld	Sp	1985			Bielefeld	Germany		1985
D113	K.D.St.V. Adolphiana Fulda	Ad	1986			Fulda	Germany		1986
D114	K.D.St.V. Ripuaria Aachen	RAa	1912			Aachen	Germany		1988
D115	K.A.V. Capitolina Rom	Cp	1986			Rome	Italy		1987
D116	K.D.St.V. Germania Leipzig	GrL	1993			Leipzig	Germany		1986
D117	K.D.St.V. Chursachsen Dresden	Cs	1992			Dresden	Germany		1993
D118	K.D.St.V. Rheno-Saxonia Köthen Halle	R-S	1992			Halle	Germany		1993
D119	K.D.St.V. Norbertina Magdeburg	Nor	1994			Magdeburg	Germany		1995
D120	A.V. Salia-Silesia Gleiwitz	S-Ss	1992			Gliwice	Poland		1993
D121	K.D.St.V. Guelfia Würzburg	Gu-W	1922			Würzburg	Germany		2005
D122	K.D.St.V. Aureo-Danubia Ingolstadt	Au-D	2004			Ingolstadt	Germany		2004
D123	K.T.V. Visurgis zu Bremen	Vis	1902			Bremen	Germany		2009
D124	K.St.V. Thuringia Coburg	Thu	1962			Coburg	Germany		2011
D125	K.D.St.V. Palatina Amberg/Weiden	Pa	2010			Amberg	Germany		2011
DOM	K.D.St.V. Suevia-Danubia Fünfkirchen	Sv-D	1991			Pécs	Hungary		1991
DAM	K.A.V. Lovania Löwen	Lov	1896		Iran Cesar	Leuven	Belgium		1897
DAM	AV Edo-Rhenania zu Tokio	E-Rh	1963		Farben der AV Edo-Rhenania Tokio	Tokyo	Japan		1964
DAM	E.St.V. Robert Schuman Argentorata Straßburg	RSA	1992			Strasbourg	France		1993
DFM	K.D.St.V. Germania Berlin United with K.D.St.V. Borussa-Saxonia Berlin	GrB	1895			Berlin	Germany		
DFM	K.D.St.V. Algovia München United with K.D.St.V. Vindelicia München	AlgM	1900			Munich	Germany		
DFM	A.V. Arminia Münster United with A.V. Cheruscia Münster 2002	ArM	1901			Münster	Germany		
DFM	K.D.St.V. Salia (Breslau) Köln United with K.D.St.V. Rheinland Köln	Sal	1904			Cologne	Germany		
DFM	V.K.D.St. Eckart Köln United with K.D.St.V. Rappolstein Straßburg Köln	Eck	1905			Cologne	Germany		
DFM	K.D.St.V. Badeno-Borussia Heidelberg United with K.D.St.V. Palatia Marburg 1908		1895			Heidelberg	Germany		
DFM	K.D.St.V. Hohentwiel Stuttgart United with A.V. Alania Stuttgart [1997]	Ht	1924			Stuttgart	Germany		
DFM	K.D.St.V. Landeck Freiburg im Breisgau United with K.D.St.V. Hercynia Freiburg im Breisgau	La	1929			Freiburg im Breisgau	Germany		
DFM	K.D.St.V. Montana Pribrans im SCV United with K.D.St.V. Ferdinandea (Prag) Heidelberg		1934			Heidelberg	Germany		
DFM	A.V. Rheinfels Bonn United with K.D.St.V. Ascania Bonn	Rfs	1946			Bonn	Germany		
DFM	K.D.St.V. Aureata Eichstätt München United with K.D.St.V. Tuiskonia München	Aur	1947			Munich	Germany		
DFM	K.D.St.V. Rheno-Bavaria Köln United with K.D.St.V. Asgard Düsseldorf Köln [1975]	R-Bv	1952			Cologne	Germany		
DFM	K.D.St.V. Rupert Mayer Frankfurt United with K.D.St.V. Guestfalo-Silesia Paderborn	RMy	1957			Frankfurt	Germany		
DFM	K.D.St.V. Ostland Clausthal-Zellerfeld United with A.V. Glückauf-Salia Clausthal-Zellerfeld	Old	1957			Clausthal-Zellerfeld	Germany		
DFM	K.D.St.V. Grotenburg (Detmold) Köln	Gbg	1920			Cologne	Germany		1922
