= Joseph Lortz =

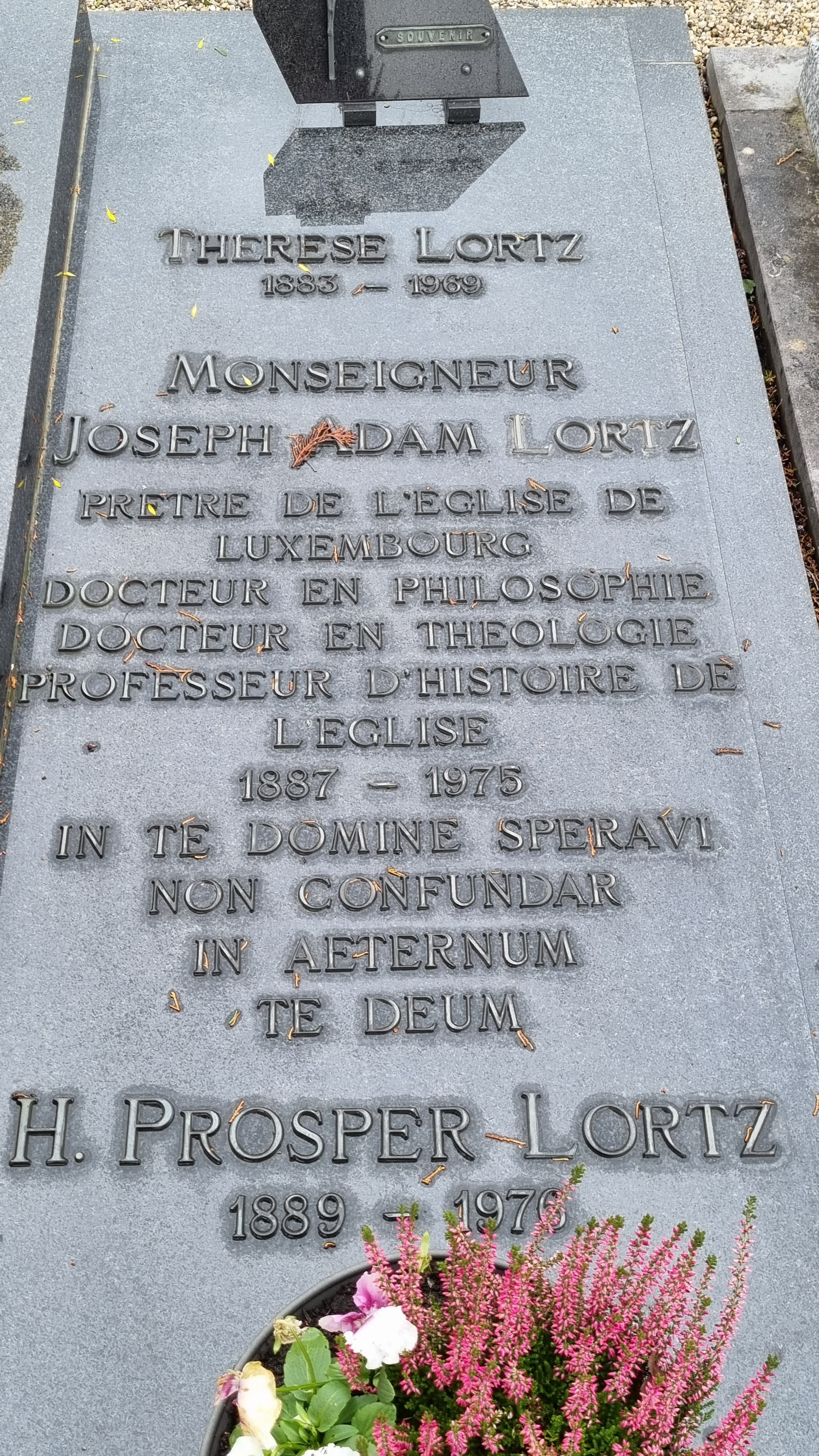
The grave in Luxembourg City

Joseph (Adam) Lortz (13 December 1887 in Grevenmacher, Luxembourg – 21 February 1975 in Luxembourg) was a Roman Catholic church historian. He was a highly regarded Reformation historian and ecumenist. Beginning in the 1940s, Lortz made his ecumenical views available to general readers as well as to scholars in order to promote reconciliation between Catholics and Protestants. His writings played a role in the thinking that manifested itself in the Second Vatican Council's Decree on Ecumenism, Unitatis Redintegratio (21 November 1964). What was not widely known, however, was Lortz's involvement with Nazism from 1933 until 1937. His Geschichte der Kirche (1932) (History of the Church) portrayed the church of the 1800s and the 1900s as the bastion of divine truth and moral values amid what he considered the decay of Western society.

== Life ==
Joseph Lortz was the second youngest of seven children. Having graduated from the Gymnasium of the benedictine Abbey of Echternach, he studied philosophy and theology at the Gregorian University in Rome from 1907 to 1910, and at the University of Fribourg from 1911 to 1913. Here he was influenced by the professor and patristics scholar Johann Peter Kirsch, who advised him to study the patristic apologist Tertullian, and the church historian Pierre Mandonnet. He was ordained to the priesthood in 1913 at the Notre-Dame Cathedral, Luxembourg. From 1913 to 1923 he lived in Bonn, where the church and Reformation historians Heinrich Schrörs and Joseph Greving influenced his further intellectual development. In 1917 he became scholarly secretary to the editorial board of the Corpus Catholicorum series.

Lortz completed his doctorate at the University of Bonn in 1920. he had intended to also complete his Habilitation there under the direction of the patristic scholar Albert Ehrhard. Erhard, however, judged that the church had nothing to fear from modernism, whilst Lortz was a critic of modernity, an admirer of Pius X for his condemnation of modernism in 1907. So for his further studies Lortz went to the University of Würzburg in 1923. In Würzburg he worked as a Privatdozent under Sebastian Merkle and also served as a chaplain. In 1929 he received a post as a professor at the Collegium Hosianum at Braunsberg in East Prussia. After the Nazi seizure of power in 1933, he published a treatise on the "Catholic accommodation with National Socialism" (Katholischer Zugang zum Nationalsozialismus). In 1935 he moved to the chair of general church history with special emphasis on the history of missions at the University of Münster. He had joined the Nazi Party in May 1933 and tried to leave in 1937. He was not permitted to leave and continued to pay membership dues until July 1944.

After the war he underwent a process of de-nazification, and was allowed to return to teaching. But he lost his position at the University of Munster after the post was returned to Georg Schreiber whom Lortz had replaced by the order of the Nazi authorities. Lortz taught at the University of Mainz from 1950 until his death in 1975. He was also director of the Institute of European History in Mainz in the department of Western religious history. His successor at that department, Peter Manns, was the editor of a centennial volume of Lortz's writings, published in 1987, and in his preface he touches on Lortz's history with the Nazis. Manns says that Lortz attempted to find a "legitimate" way for Catholics to connect to Nazism, an attempt he calls an error with grave consequences for which Lortz should be held culpable (and Manns includes no writings from that period in the volume). However, he argues that Lortz was not a Nazi himself, and that such is proven by his friendship with avowed opponents of the Nazis, including Clemens August Graf von Galen and Max Josef Metzger.

He was a member of the Catholic fraternity K.D.St.V. Teutonia of the CV in Freiburg/Üechtland.

Many of Lortz's works engaged the issue of the relation between the Roman Catholic Church and the Reformation. His best known work remains The Reformation in Germany.

Among Lortz's better known students are Manns, Erwin Iserloh, Karl Pellens, Armin Lindauer, and Alex Schröer.

== Works ==
- Katholischer Zugang zum Nationalsozialismus, kirchengeschichtlich gesehen. 1933, 2nd, 3rd ed. 1934
- Die Reformation. Kyrios, 1947
- The Reformation. A Problem For Today. The Newman Press, 1964
- Geschichte der Kirche in ideengeschichtlicher Betrachtung. 1935. (15th and 16th eds. Aschendorff, 1950)
- Die Reformation in Deutschland
  - Volume 1. Voraussetzungen. Herder, 1949 (5th ed. 1965)
  - Volume 2. Ausbau der Fronten, Unionsversuche, Ergebnis. Herder, 1949 (4th ed. 1952)
- Bernhard von Clairvaux, Mönch und Mystiker. Steiner, 1955
- (with Walther von Loewenich and Fyodor Stepun Europa und das Christentum. Zabern 1959. ISBN 3-8053-2046-9
- Geschichte der Kirche in ideengeschichtlicher Betrachtung
  - Volume 1. Altertum und Mittelalter. 21st ed. Aschendorff, 1962
  - Volume 2. Die Neuzeit. 21st ed. Aschendorff, 1964
- The Reformation in Germany. 2 vols. New York, Herder and Herder, 1968. ISBN 0-232-48386-8
- (with Erwin Iserloh) Kleine Reformationsgeschichte. 2nd ed. Herder, 1971
