= AV Edo-Rhenania zu Tokio =

Japanese student fraternity

- E-Rh!
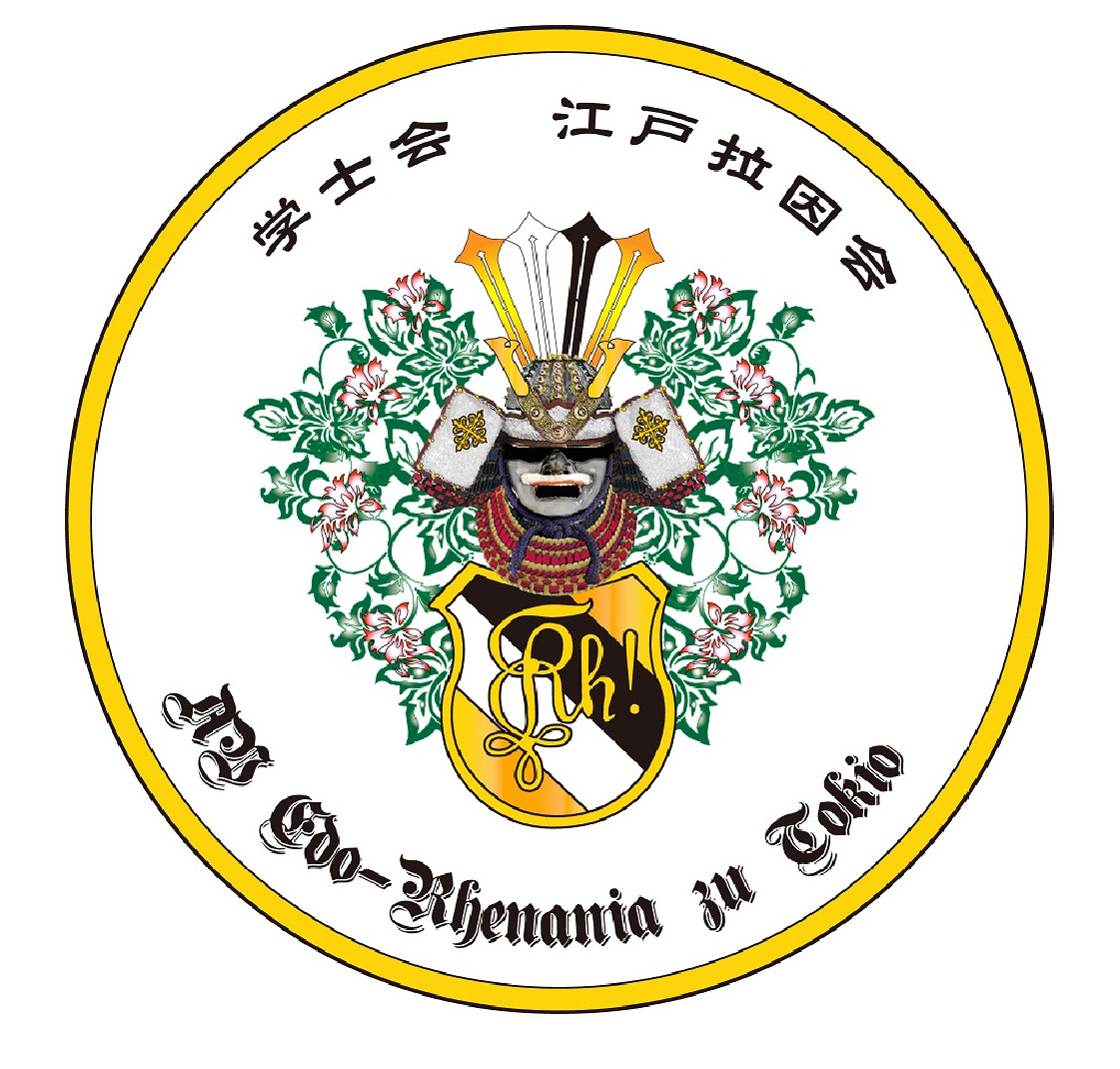
- Founded: May 26, 1963; 63 years ago Tokyo
- Type: Studentenverbindung
- Affiliation: Union of Catholic German Student Fraternities
- Status: Active
- Scope: Local
- Motto: Ex oriente lux! "From the East (comes) light"
- Pillars: Religio, Patria, Amicitia, Scientia
- Colors: Gold, Black, and White
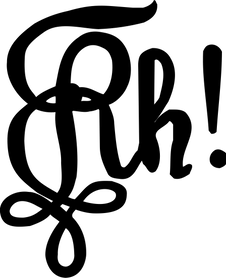
- Zirkel

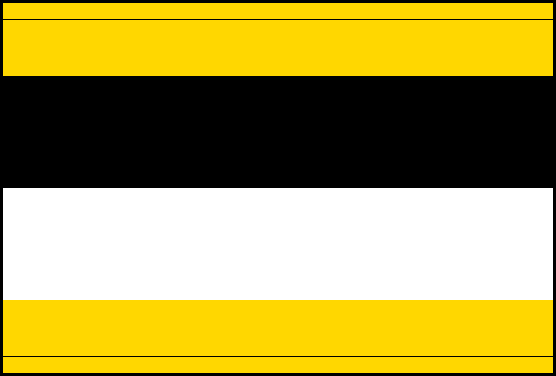
- Flag
- Patron saint: Albertus Magnus
- Chapters: 1
- Nickname: ERTO
- Headquarters: Tokyo; Japan
- Website: www.edo-rhenania-tokio.org

The Japanese student fraternity Akademische Vereinigung Edo Rhenania zu Tokio (Japanese: 学士会江戸拉因会, Gakushikai Edo-Rainkai) is the oldest Studentenverbindung in Asia. It is an associated member of the Union of Catholic German Student Fraternities (Cartellverband) and is officially acknowledged as a befriended fraternity by the Union of Catholic Austrian Student Fraternities. Until the foundation of KÖStV Golania zu Arné in Syria in 1994, it was the only Studentenverbindung in all of Asia, and until the foundation of AFV Sino-Germania zu Peking et Shanghai in China in 2014, the only one in East Asia. AV Edo-Rhenania continues to be the only member fraternity of the Cartellverband in Asia.

== History ==
In 1951, Yujiro Shinoda, a Japanese student who was to later become one of the founding members of AV Edo-Rhenania, was admitted to the Colognian student fraternity AV Rheinstein zu Köln. The admission of a foreign national into a fraternity belonging to the Cartellverband umbrella association was unprecedented at the time and is regarded as a milestone in the Cartellverband's history. In 1963, AV Rheinstein zu Köln founded AV Edo-Rhenania zu Tokio as its subsidiary in Tokyo. Their own member Yujiro Shinoda became AV Edo-Rhenania's first chairman. Japanese and Germans were equally involved in the foundation of AV Edo-Rhenania, and it has been an independent fraternity ever since its inception.

In 1964, AV Edo-Rhenania was officially recognized as an associated member (German: assoziiertes Mitglied) of the Cartellverband. As a result of this special status, members of AV Edo-Rhenania do not possess the right to vote at the annual Cartellversammlung, the Cartellverband's primary legislative assembly, but in return the induction of unbaptized students into AV Edo-Rhenania is tolerated. Given that no more than approximately one per cent of the Japanese population are Christian, this exemption vis-à-vis other member fraternities has often been interpreted as an essential prerequisite for AV Edo-Rhenania’s subsequent growth. Apart from the aforementioned restrictions and privileges, AV Edo-Rhenania’s status within the Cartellverband is identical to that of other member fraternities. In 1974, the Austrian Cartellverband, too, recognized AV Edo-Rhenania as a befriended student fraternity (German: Freundschaftsverbindung).

Since its foundation in 1963, AV Edo-Rhenania has actively promoted German-Japanese relations by – among other things – granting scholarships to Japanese collegiate students bound for exchanges to German-language universities, hosting trips to Europe for its members, and organizing German speech contests.

== Traditions and language ==
AV Edo-Rhenania replicates most of the traditions of German Studentverbindungen with only minor Japanese influences. AV Edo-Rhenania hosts commercia (sing. commercium) and Kneipen (sing. Kneipe) – the less formal equivalents of commercia – on a regular basis, both of which are held entirely in German. This refers to the formalized execution of the event; guest speakers and members alike might still use Japanese for presentations or informal salutations. AV Edo-Rhenania uses the same array of predominantly German and Latin songs at its events as is common among fraternities in Central Europe. The songbook currently in use is the Allgemeines Deutsches Kommersbuch. For official texts such as the statutes of the fraternity, as well as for written communication between members, Japanese and German are used almost interchangeably. As a vernacular, especially among young members, English is also used alongside German and Japanese.

Like most other Studentverbindungen, AV Edo-Rhenania divides its members into the three categories of Fuxen (sing. Fux), Burschen (sing. Bursch), and Alte Herren (sing. Alter Herr). Membership is exclusive to males enrolled in higher education. Fuxen (cf. pledges at American fraternities) are probationary members with decreased rights – e.g. they cannot represent AV Edo-Rhenania in official correspondence with other fraternities -, but also decreased responsibilities. Commonly, after their induction, members of AV Edo-Rhenania remain Fuxen for two semesters, during which they are familiarized with the history, traditions, and rules of the fraternity. Upon completion of this one-year trial period, Fuxen take an oral exam to determine whether they have attained the necessary knowledge and skills to become a regular member. On condition that they pass, they become Burschen, who bear the full rights and responsibilities associated with membership in the fraternity. The Burschen organize most events hosted by AV Edo-Rhenania and govern the fraternity in a democratic fashion. Their tasks, among others, include the generation and allocation of funds, the education of Fuxen, and the administration of the fraternity. There is no limit to the number of attempts at taking the exam needed to attain the rank of Bursche. Alumni of the fraternity are referred to as Alte Herren. They participate much less actively in fraternity life, but in return contribute most of the fraternity's funding, reflecting their decreased leisure but increased affluence vis-à-vis college students.

Studentverbindungen have a tradition of making their Fuxen choose a member of the fraternity as Biervater (pl. Bierväter, syn. Leibvater, Leibbursch), who will thereafter mentor the Fux to ensure his success within the fraternity. Whereas at most Central European fraternities the Biervater usually is a Bursch of the respective fraternity, AV Edo-Rhenania has a sustained, informal tradition of Fuxen picking Alte Herren as their Bierväter.

== Symbols ==
AV Edo-Rhenania's name is derived from Tokyo's former name Edo and the German river Rhine (Latin: Rhenus), in whose vicinity the fraternity AV Rheinstein zu Köln is located. The latter played a fundamental role in Edo-Rhenania's foundation, and the two fraternities have since continued to closely cooperate and support one another. The official colors of AV Edo-Rhenania are gold, black, and white. Among many other items, they are represented in the fraternity's crest, formal uniform, and flag, as well as in the sashes worn by full members. The color gold represents the Rhine river (in German folklore the Rhine river connotes gold, cf. Das Rheingold) By extension, it alludes to AV Rheinstein zu Köln. Black is one of the three colors of the German flag, whereas white is one of the two colors of the Japanese flag. By combining gold, black, and white, AV Edo-Rhenania's colors symbolize the German-Japanese friendship born by AV Rheinstein zu Köln und AV Edo-Rhenania.

It is common for the crests of European fraternities to contain a helm. In its stead, AV Edo-Rhenania's crest uses a Kabuto. The official hymns of AV Edo-Rhenania are in Japanese, except for the last verse respectively of the Song of Full Members and the Song of Pledges, which are both in German. The hymns were created in this way so members of other fraternities could sing along during the last verse, as is common practice when multiple Studentenverbindungen meet. The anthem of AV Edo-Rhenania is entirely in Japanese.

The Latin motto Ex oriente lux! literally means "from the East (comes) light". When the phrase was first used by the Romans, it described the simple astronomical fact that the sun rises in the East, however, later in history, its meaning shifted towards an interpretation that wisdom and knowledge came from the East. AV Edo-Rhenania adopted the phrase as its motto in its more recent meaning.

== Albertusring ==
In 1957 the Austrian fraternity KAV Danubia Wien-Korneuburg, the Swiss fraternity AV Turicia Zürich, and the German fraternity AV Rheinstein zu Köln founded the Albertusring, an inter-fraternal platform whose aim it was to promote and organize international student exchange. Though at the time not yet a fraternity, AV Edo-Rhenania's precursor, the Japanese Association of Catholic Students, is considered a founding member. Upon its transformation into a fully operational fraternity in 1963, it joined the Albertusring under its new name AV Edo-Rhenania zu Tokio as a member of equal rank. To this day, a close and equally active friendship between AV Edo-Rhenania, KAV Wien-Korneuburg, AV Turicia Zürich, and AV Rheinstein zu Köln continues. Apart from its members that are Studentenverbindungen, the Albertusring counts among its ranks student associations in France, Belgium, and Portugal. The Albertusring is named after the Colognian scholar and bishop Albertus Magnus, who is the patron saint of academia. In his honor, AV Edo-Rhenania annually celebrates a Holy Mass and a commercium. This event is known as the Albertusfest.

== Befriended fraternities ==
- AV Rheinstein zu Köln
- KAV Danubia Wien-Korneuburg
- AV Turicia Zürich

== Notable Honorary-band holders ==
- Prince Yoshihito of Katsura
- Prince Norihito of Takamado
- Prince Tomohito of Mikasa
- Klaus Luhmer SJ – Chancellor of Sophia University
- Peter Shirayanagi – Archbishop of Tokyo
- Joseph Atsumi Misue – Bishop of Hiroshima

== Notable members ==
- Jean-Claude Hollerich – Archbishop of Luxembourg
- Josef Klaus – Austrian Federal Chancellor
- Wolfgang Schmitz – Austrian Federal Minister of Finance
- Helmut Wegner – German diplomat
- Michael Zimmermann – Austrian diplomat

== See also ==
- Union of Catholic German Student Fraternities
- List of member fraternities of the Cartellverband
