= Kessel-Lo =

Sub-municipality of the city of Leuven, Belgium

- Sub-municipality of Leuven
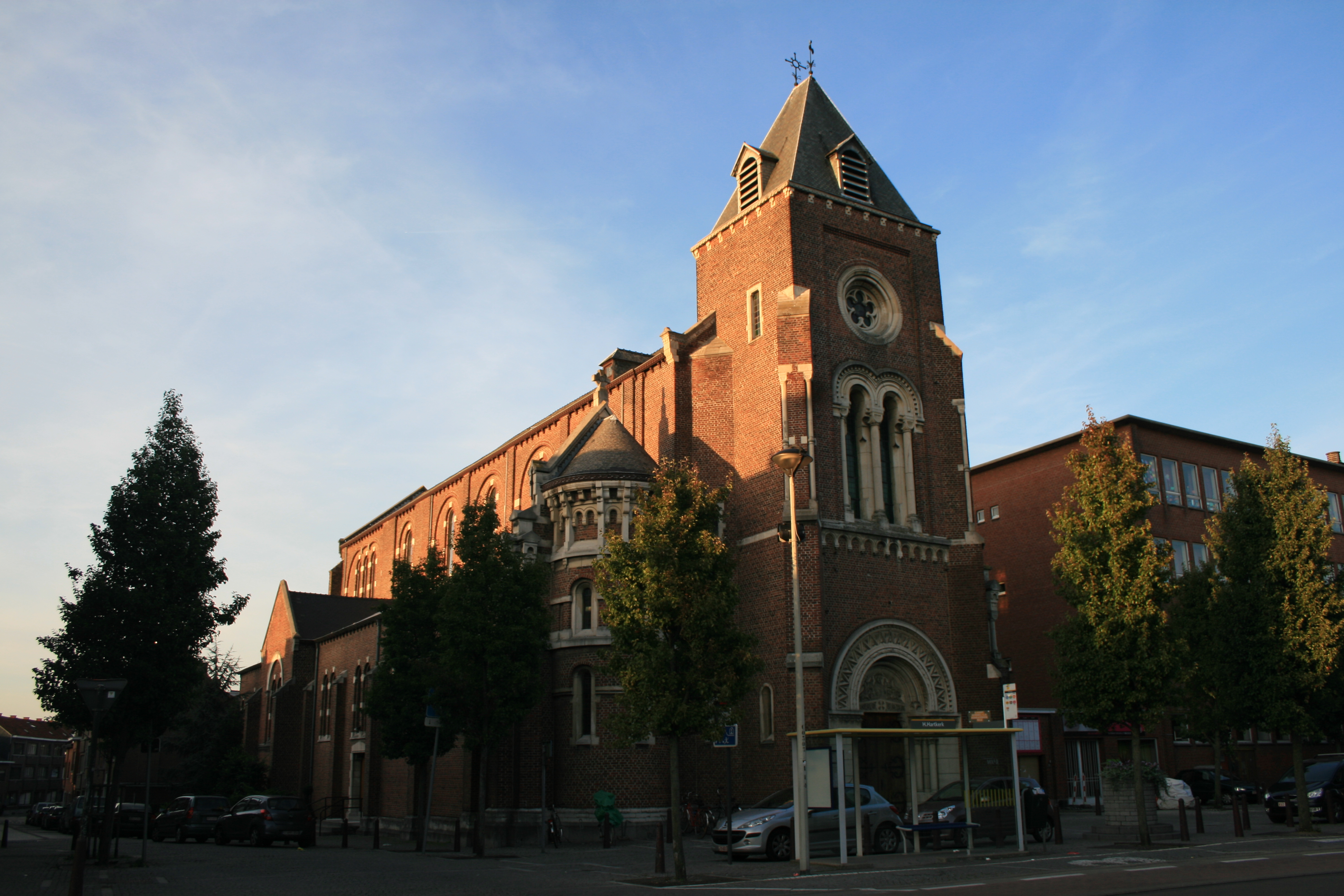
- Sacred Heart Church
- Interactive map of Kessel-Lo
- Location within Belgium Location within Flemish Brabant
- Coordinates: 50°53′07″N 4°44′09″E
- Country: Belgium
- Community: Flemish Community
- Region: Flemish Region
- Province: Flemish Brabant
- Arrondissement: Leuven
- Municipality: Leuven

Area
  - Total: 13.30 km^{2} (5.14 sq mi)

Population (2020-01-01)
  - Total: 30,317
  - Density: 2,279/km^{2} (5,904/sq mi)
- Postal codes: 3010
- Area codes: 016

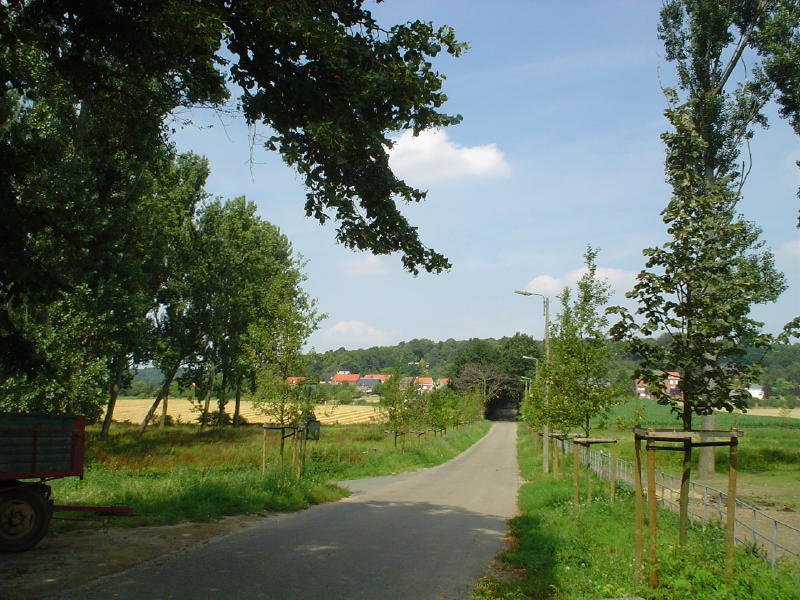
Fields surrounding Vlierbeek Abbey

Kessel-Lo (Dutch pronunciation: [ˈkɛsəˌloː]) is a sub-municipality of the city of Leuven located in the province of Flemish Brabant, Flemish Region, Belgium. It was a separate municipality until 1977. The city was merged into Leuven as a sub-municipality on 1 January 1977.

== Etymology ==
Its name is derived from "Kessel" (from the Latin "Castellum" for fortress, referring to a fortress that once stood on the Kessel mountain) and "Lo" (forest clearing).

== Culture ==
Kessel-Lo is home to the Provinciaal Domein Kessel-Lo, a large provincial park with ponds, playgrounds, soccer fields, Tennis courts, fishing and other areas for recreational activities. It also has an 'Ecocentrum' which is the starting point for all activities around nature and environmental education. The town has nice smaller public parks such as Park Bellevue, Heuvelhof and Park Michotte and is also known for Vlierbeek Abbey, an old Benedictine abbey built in 1125.

Several youth organisations are present in Kessel-Lo, such as Chiro Don Bosco, Chiro Vlierbeek, Scouts Vlierbeek, Chiro Blauwput, Chiro Hekeko, Scouts De Vlievleger and Scouts Boven-lo.

A local brewery has recently been founded called "De Vlier". They brew a blond beer called "Kessel's Blond".

=== Sport ===
Kessel-Lo is also the home of the Rugby Club Leuven.
