= Götz Briefs =

German social ethicist and economist (1889–1974)

Götz Briefs (1 January 1889, Eschweiler – 16 May 1974, Rome) was a Catholic social theorist, social ethicist, social philosopher and political economist, who together with Gustav Gundlach, SJ influenced the social teachings of Pope Pius XI.

== Biography ==
In 1908, Briefs began to study history and philosophy at the Ludwig-Maximilians-Universität München. As it was customary in German academic circles at the time, he frequently switched universities, moving in 1909 to Bonn, and later in 1911 to Freiburg. In Freiburg, he became a member of K.D.St. V. Wildenstein Freiburg im Breisgau, a Catholic student fraternity that belong to the Cartellverband der katholischen deutschen Studentenverbindungen. In 1911, he completed his doctoral dissertation with an investigation of the influence of the alcoholic beverage industry on market price structures. He was awarded the highest honor summa cum laude for his dissertation and continued on the topic of profits with his Habilitation on the effect of average profits on the economy in 1913.

In 1919, he was named Professor for economics at the University of Freiburg. Two years later, in 1921, he accepted a professorship at the University of Würzburg. In 1923, he returned to the University of Freiburg and in 1926 to the Technische Hochschule Berlin. In 1928, he founded an Institute for Industrial Sociology in Berlin.

After the National Socialists won the elections in Germany and took over the government, he, like many other outspoken Catholics, lost his career and was forced to leave his native country. Göetz Briefs immigrated to the US, where he found a teaching position as guest professor at the Catholic University and later full professor at the Jesuit Georgetown University in Washington, D.C.

After being widowed during the war years, he married Elinor Castendyk in 1951, who later became known for her work on and translations of Romano Guardini. After his retirement, the couple lived in a mountain retreat near the Trappist monastery Holy Cross Abbey in Berryville in Clarke County, Virginia, which he visited with his wife on a daily basis. Briefs influenced the social teachings of the Catholic Church and was considered a ghostwriter of the encyclical Quadragesimo anno of Pope Pius XI with his friend, the Jesuit Gustav Gundlach, with whom he spent his annual Summer vacations together. On 16 May 1974 Briefs died in Rome after a short illness. He is buried in the Vatican's Campo Santo Teutonico.

With Gustav Gundlach, Theodor Brauer, Paul Jostock, Franz H. Mueller, Heinrich Rommen and Oswald von Nell-Breuning, he was a member of the "Königswinter Circle" at the Königswinter "Institute for Society and Economy". Briefs received multiple scholarships and six honorary doctorates. In addition:

- 1959 – The Distinguished Service Cross of the Federal Republic of Germany "Pour le merit"
- 1968 – The Star to the Order of Merit

Briefs published approximately 350 scientific articles. The road "Götz-Briefs-Weg" in his hometown was named after him in 1989.
