= Vlierbeek Abbey =

Former Benedictine abbey

Coordinates: 50°53′30.12″N 4°44′8.99″E

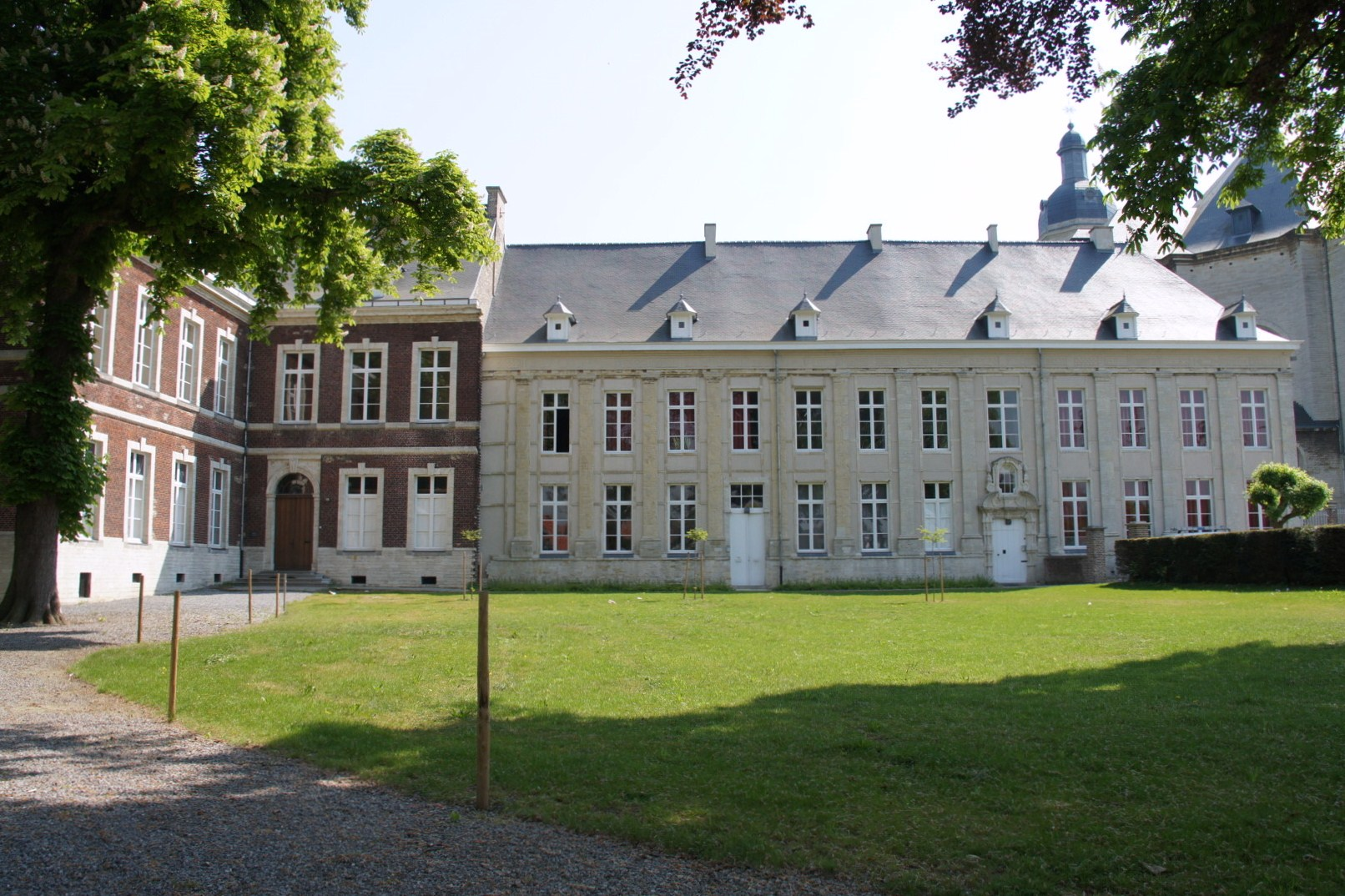
New abbot's lodgings

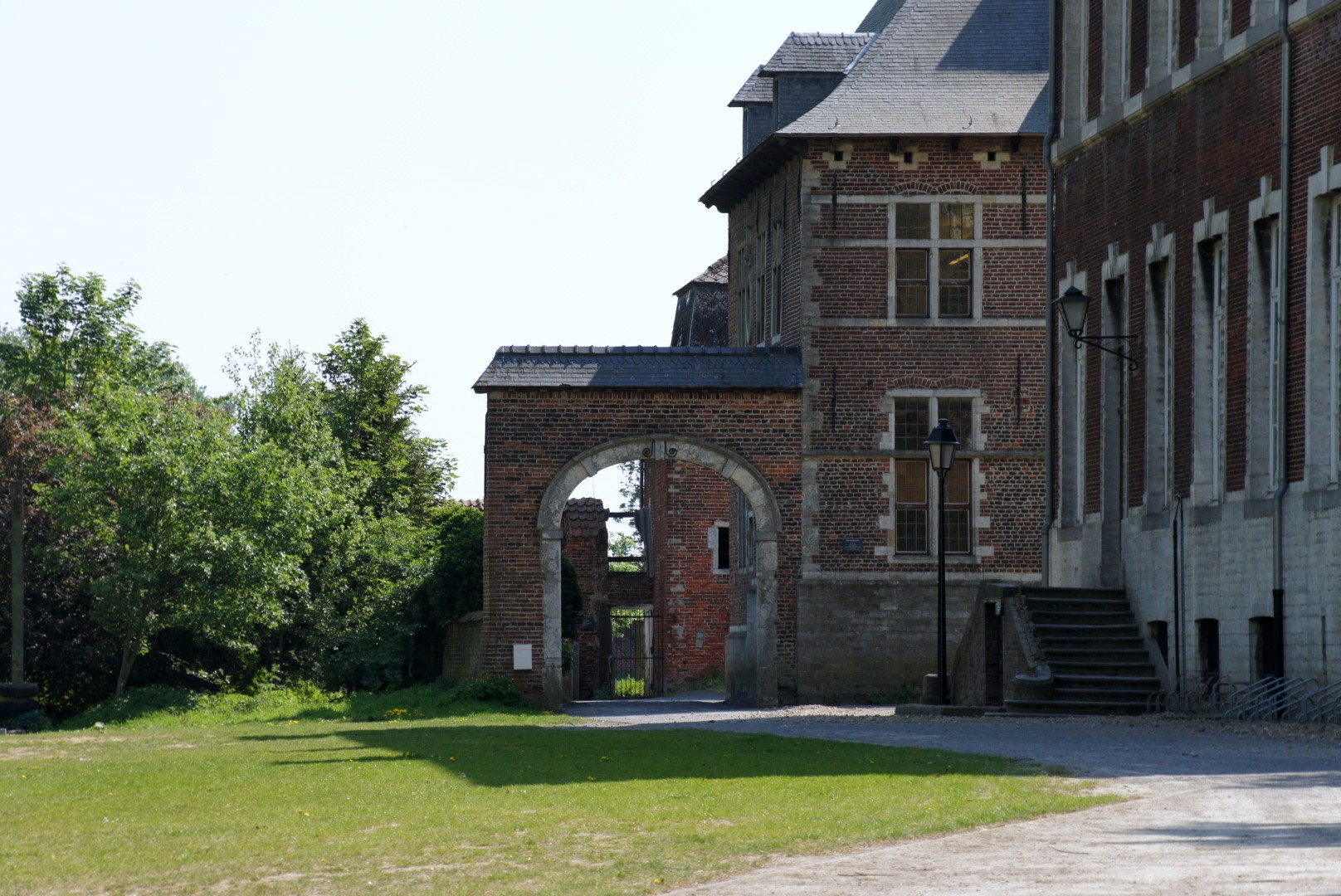
Old abbot's lodgings

Vlierbeek Abbey (Dutch: Abdij van Vlierbeek) is a former Benedictine abbey to the north-east of Leuven in Belgium, in the sub-district Kessel-Lo.

== History ==
On the abbey site in 1127 a priory was founded by Affligem Abbey, to whom Godfrey I of Louvain had given the land on the Vlierbeek two years previously. In 1163 or 1165 the priory was elevated to the status of an abbey. The Benedictines cultivated the surrounding land, and played a great role in the spiritual and intellectual development of the area. Over the next few centuries they worked almost constantly on the abbey complex, having often to repair or rebuild what had been destroyed by fire or conflict.

In 1170 a stone church in Romanesque style replaced the first church, which was made of clay.

In 1572 the abbey was burnt down by the troops of William of Orange. The reconstruction of the abbey was spread over two periods. The first lasted from 1642 to c. 1730. The second, under the direction of Laurent-Benoît Dewez, lasted from 1776 to 1796.

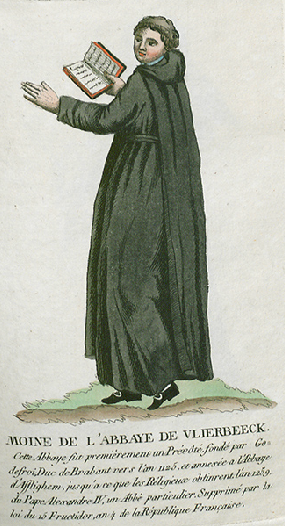
Monk of Vlierbeek Abbey

During the occupation by the French Revolutionary army the abbey, like all other monasteries, was suppressed in 1796, and the monks were expelled. The buildings and contents were sold off in 1798. Jan Antoon de Becker of Louvain, brother of one of the monks, became the new owner. In 1801 the abbot and some of the monks returned, but a full revival of the community did not succeed, and the last monk of Vlierbeek died in 1838.

After the creation of the municipality of Kessel-Lo in 1828 the abbey church became the parish church for the whole of it. In 1877 the parish of Blauwput was separated. In 1900 Boven-Lo also became an independent parish. From that point the former abbey church became the parish church of the parish of Vlierbeek.

In 1830 de Becker donated the church to the churchwardens and in 1837 he made a further gift to them of the remaining abbey buildings. Some were demolished, others rented to individuals.

Vlierbeek remained rural until World War II. After the war the population and construction increased rapidly and a school (the "abbey school") was built there.

In early 1970 the province of Brabant bought the remaining rural area round the abbey in order to prevent the neighbourhood from being parcelled out in building plots. This area was expanded to form the Kessel-Lo province estate.

For more than 60 years Chiro Vlierbeek, a Catholic youth group, has used the abbey buildings.

== Abbey church ==
The Neo-classical abbey church was designed by the well-known architect Laurent-Benoît Dewez (1731-1812). The central part is octagonal and is crowned by a cupola. The openings have various geometric forms such as semi-circle or a trapezium. The interior is severe and light. The monks' choir terminates in a square tower with an octagonal skylight.

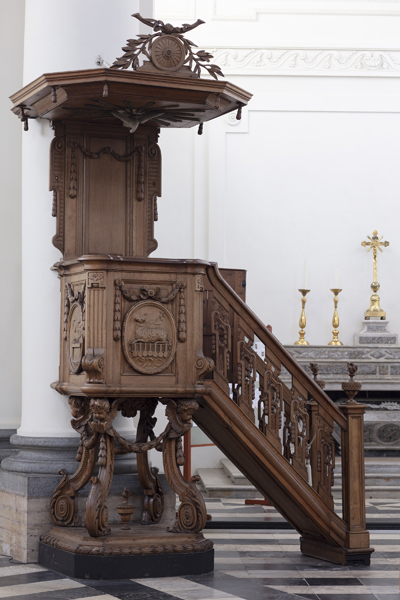
Pulpit

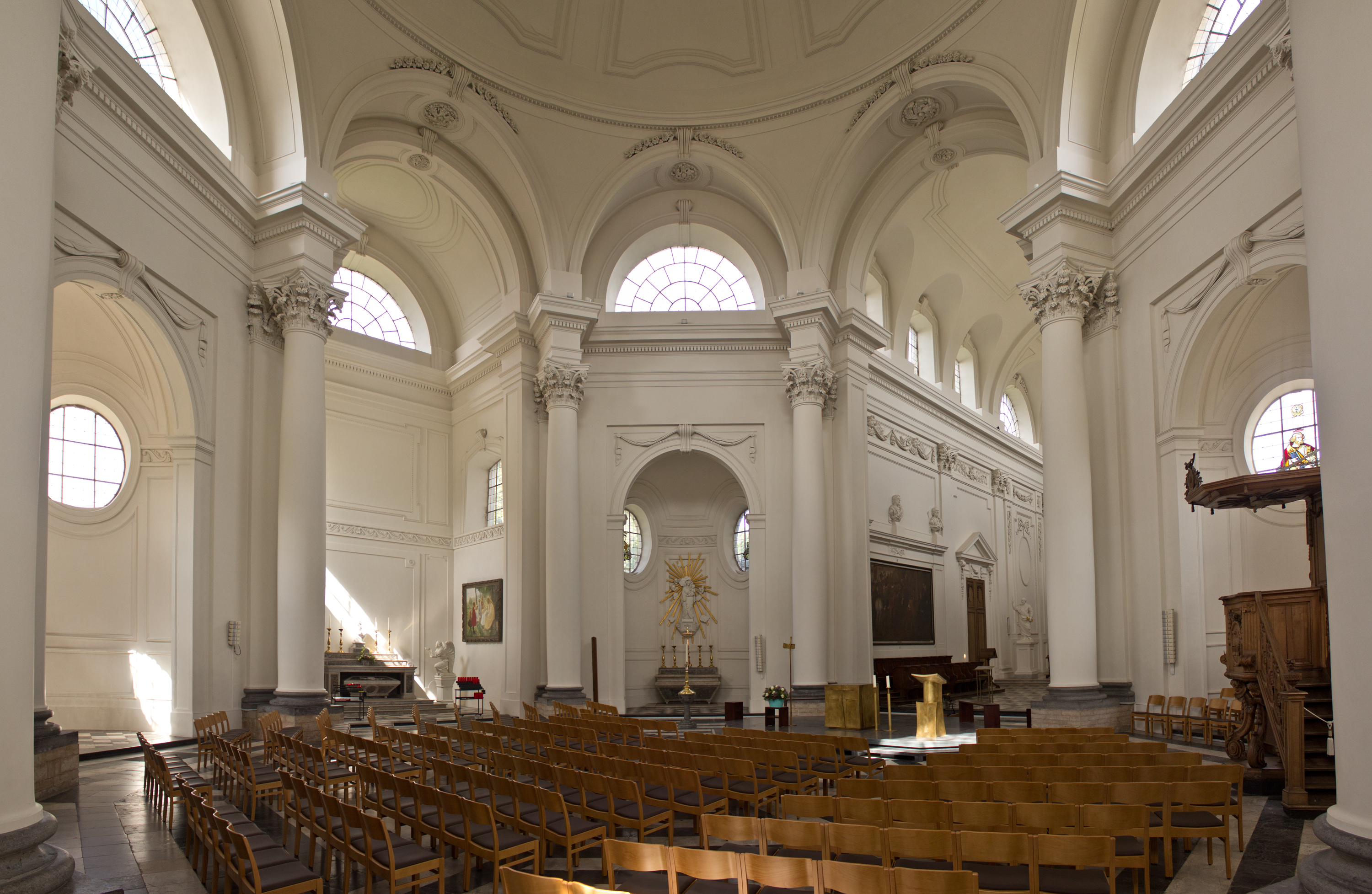
Octagonal interior

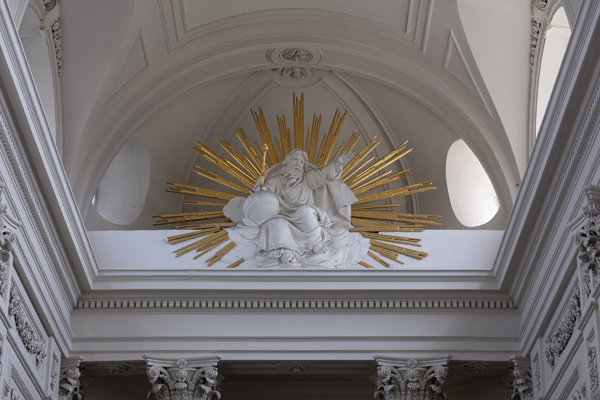
Sculpture of God above the altar

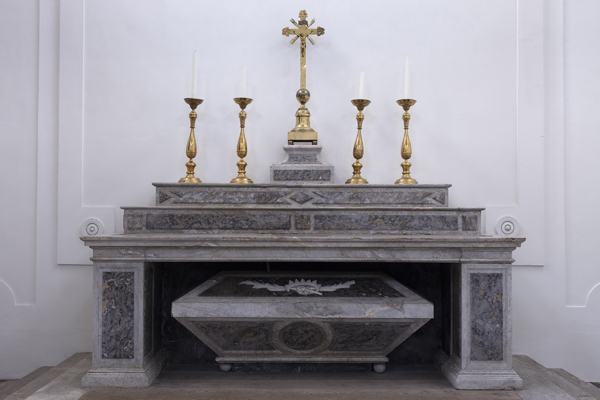
Northern altar

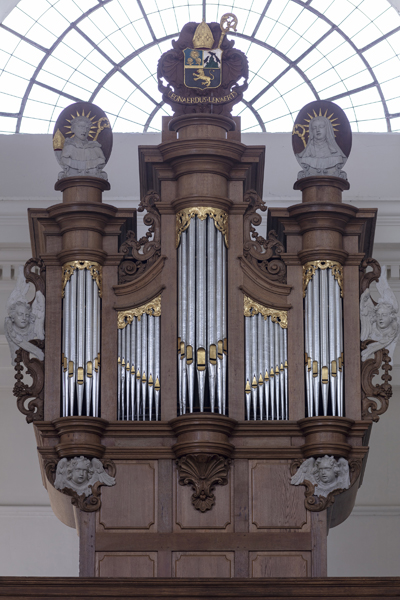
Le Picard organ

== Churchyard ==
In the churchyard are burial monuments of prominent persons, including the professors Alberdingk-Thijm (1827-1904), Emiel Vliebergh (1872-1925), Mgr. Pieter-Jozef Sencie (1865-1941) and student leader Jef Vanden Eynde (1879-1929).

== Visits ==
Every weekend a mass is celebrated in the church. Apart from this the church is accessible to visitors, and the abbot's lodgings are accessible on special occasions. The other buildings are private property.

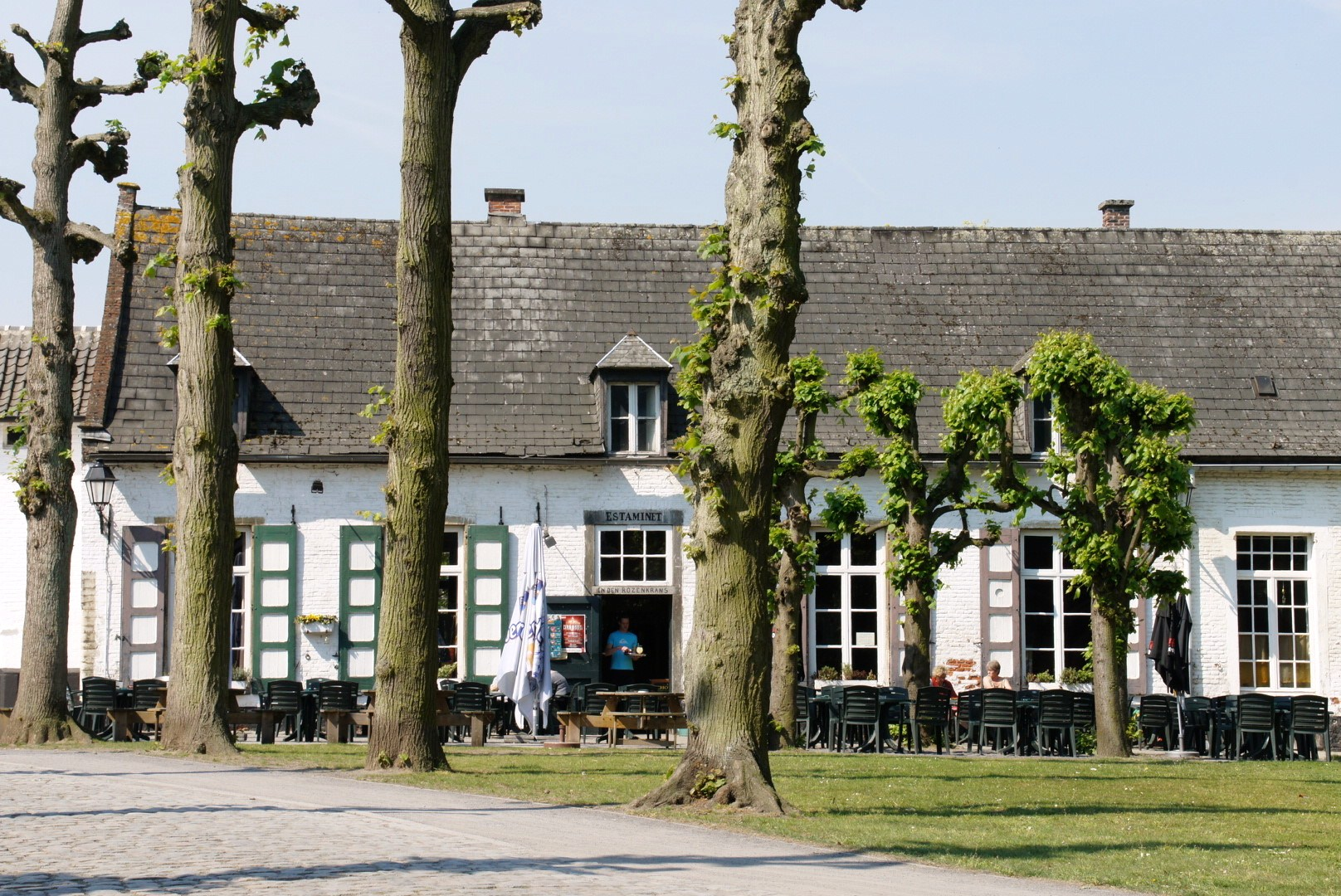
The inn "In den Rozenkrans"

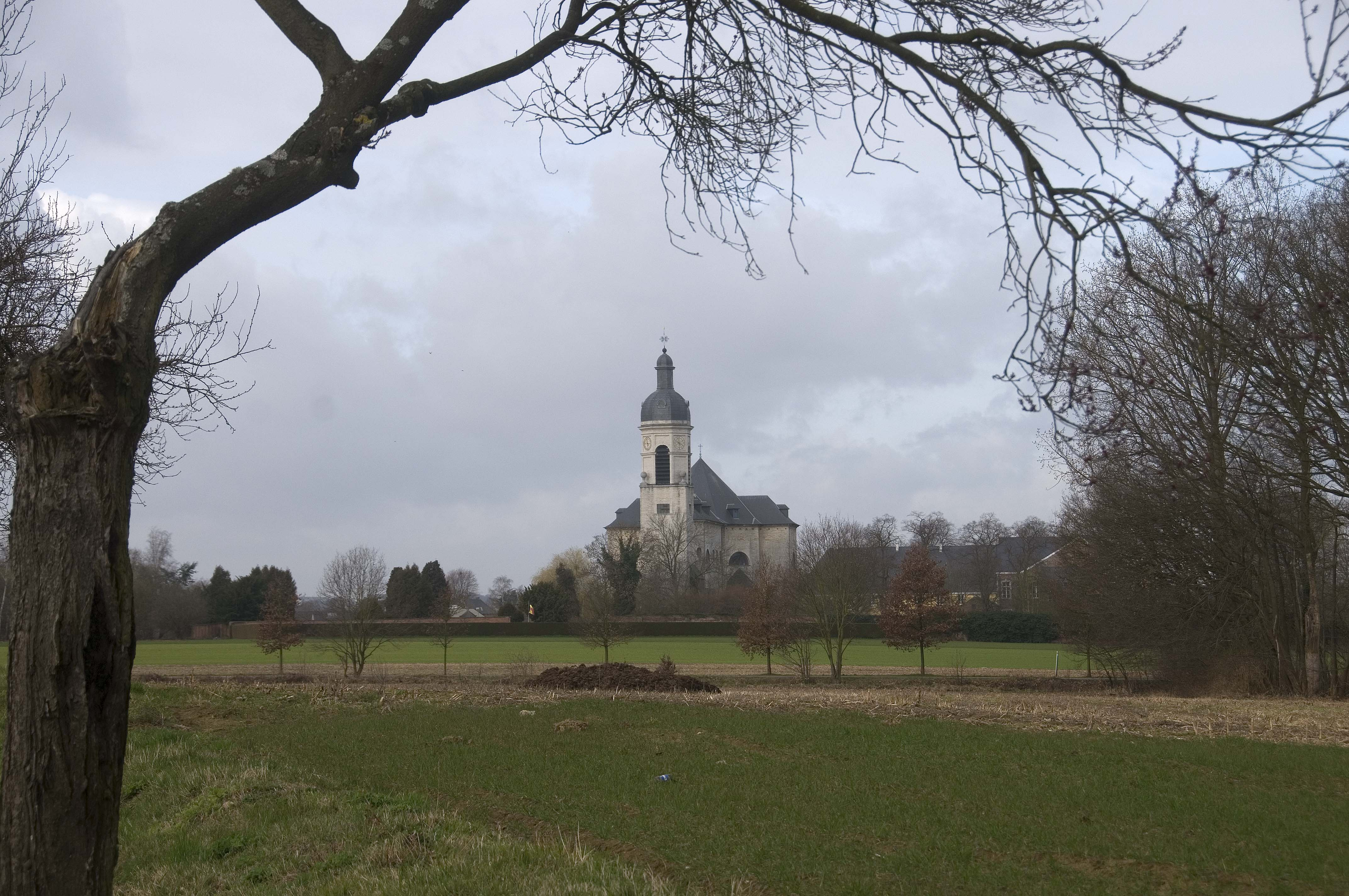
Abbey church

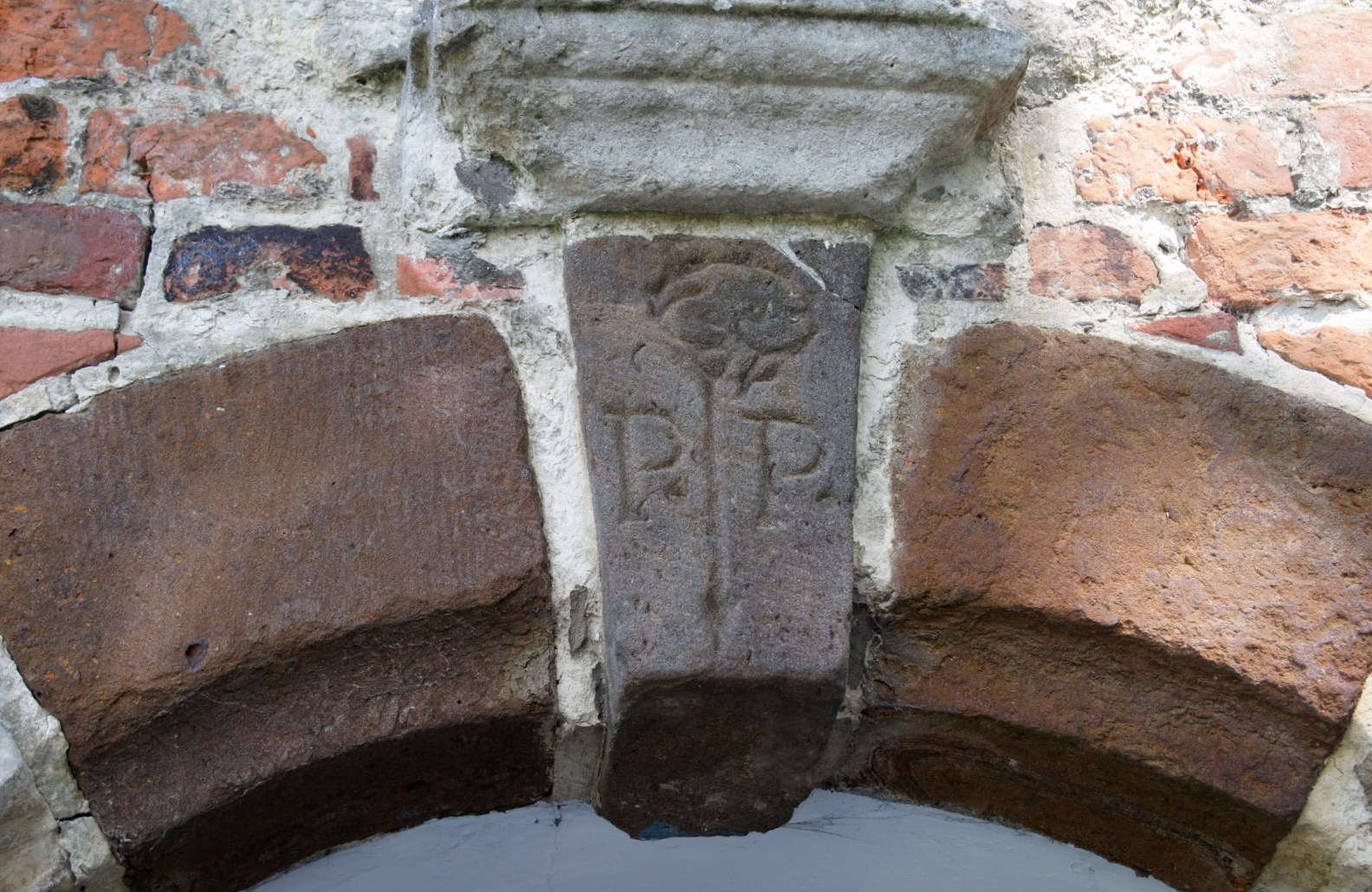
Sandstone door arches

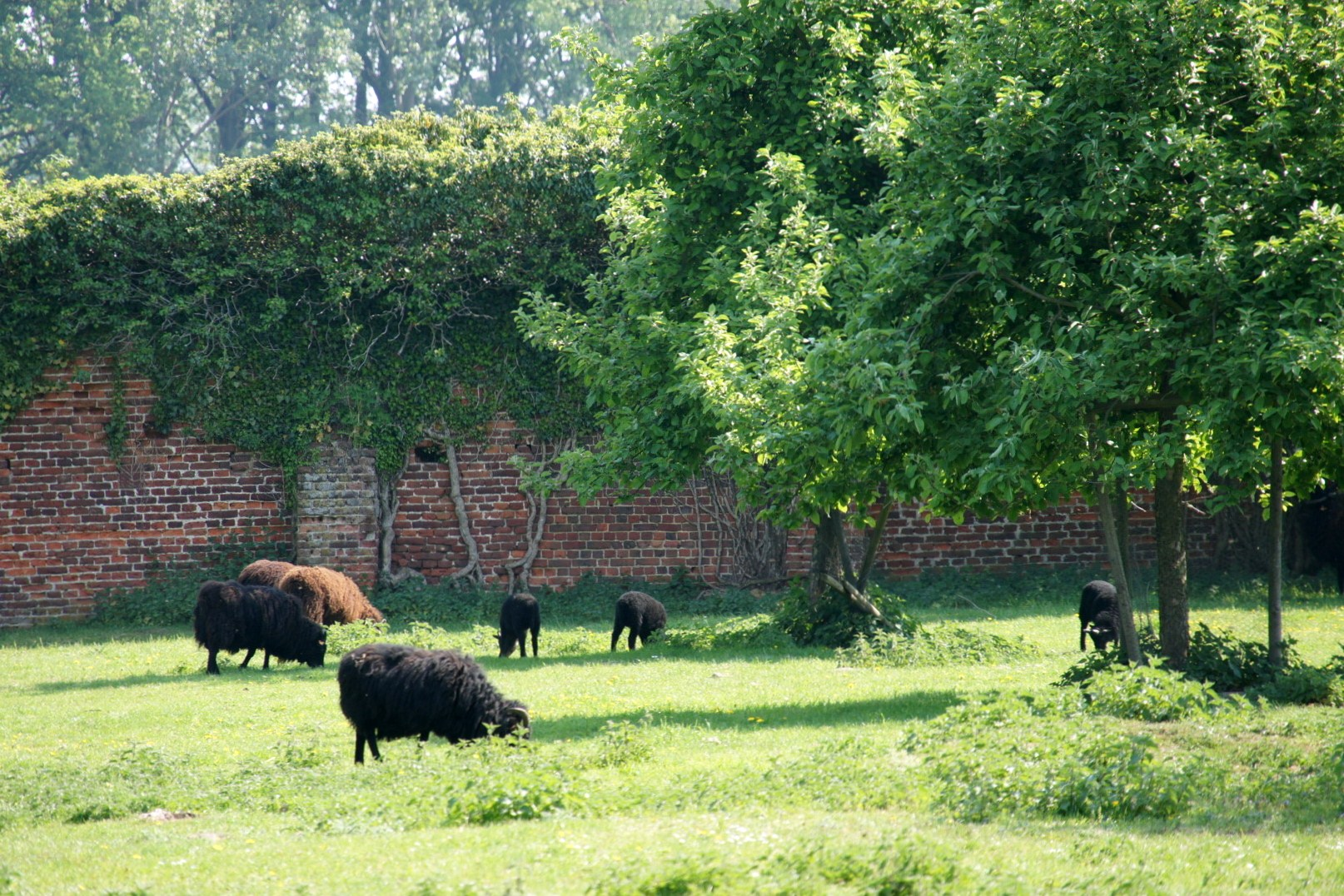
Black Hebrideans in the 17th-century walled orchard
