= Jef Van den Eynde =

Belgian politician (1879–1929)

- Jef Van den Eynde as a student
- Born: Joseph Maria August Antoon Van den Eynde; 21 December 1879; Olsene, Belgium
- Died: 12 April 1929 (aged 49); Maastricht, Netherlands
- Education: KU Leuven
- Occupations: Activist, student leader

Jozef Maria August Antoon (Jef) Van den Eynde (21 December 1879 – 12 April 1929) was a prominent figure from Leuven's student life, an activist and member of the Council of Flanders during the First World War. After the war, he fled to the Netherlands, having received a 20-year sentence in absentia for collaboration.

He made a valuable contribution as secretary of the linguistic society Met Tijd en Vlijt and of the Social Speakers Union (Dutch: Sociale Sprekersbond). He became president of the East Flemish student guild and founder-conductor of the student orchestra, in which he played the piano and violin himself. From 1901 to 1908 he was editor-in-chief of Ons Leven and president of the Vlaamsch Verbond.

During his many years as a perpetual student, he managed to leave a mark on student traditions and student life. His main goal was to bring the students to a higher cultural level. Many prominent Flemish leaders were invited by him to address the students, such as Frans Van Cauwelaert, Lodewijk Dosfel, René De Clercq, Stijn Streuvels, Karel Van de Woestijne, Hugo Verriest and many others. He also acted as a music patron. He campaigned for the launch of Flemish composers, such as Emiel Hullebroeck, Karel Mestdagh and Arthur Meulemans. He also composed and wrote several student songs, such as the Verbondslied of the Katholiek Vlaams Hoogstudentenverbond (KVHV). In 1907 he introduced the Flemish student cap, after the German model.

Successive generations of Leuven students honored his memory and elevated him to a legendary figure. Edmond de Goeyse (1907–1998) was very active in this and was regarded as his spiritual heir. In 1955 the KVHV even transferred his remains to Vlierbeek.
