= K.A.V. Lovania Leuven =

Catholic academic fraternity in Leuven, Belgium

- K.A.V.
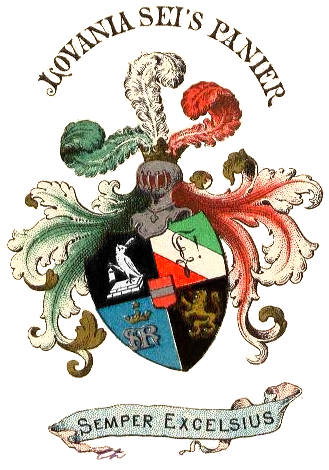
- Founded: 1896; 130 years ago Catholic University of Louvain
- Type: Studentenverbindung
- Affiliation: CV
- Status: Active
- Emphasis: Catholic
- Scope: Local
- Motto: Semper Excelsius!
- Colors: Green, White and Red
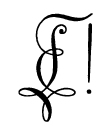
- Zirkel
- Chapters: 1
- Headquarters: Leuven; Belgium
- Website: Official website

Katholische Academische Verbindung (K.A.V.) Lovania Leuven is a Catholic academic fraternity, founded in 1896 at the Catholic University of Louvain in Leuven, Belgium. It is a German Studentenverbindung and is an affiliated member of the Cartellverband der katholischen deutschen Studentenverbindungen. Its motto is Semper Excelsius! (Der Geist lebt in uns allen!). Its official colors (Couleur) are green, white and red.

== History ==
The Old University of Leuven, founded in 1425, was closed down during the occupation of the Low Countries in 1797 after the French revolutionaries occupied the country. After the defeat of the revolutionaries and Belgian independence from the Netherlands, the Catholic University of Louvain was founded in 1834 and was able to attract Catholic students from Germany, Austria and Switzerland who were fleeing the Kulturkampf.

Helvetia Lovaniensis was the first Swiss Catholic student fraternity. It existed from 1872 to 1875. It was succeeded by an all-German Catholic student fraternity, Tungria Lovaniensis, that existed from 1877 until 1879. In 1888, a regional student fraternity was founded by students from Luxemburg. Only the last fraternity survived. Out of the ashes of the demise of the Swiss and German fraternities, a new fraternity was founded.

This event was triggered by a public allocution of Armand Thiéry, a professor in thomistic philosophy at the university, on student life at Germanic universities on January 21, 1896. During his student years in Bonn, Thiéry became a member of the prestigious student fraternity K.D.St. V. Bavaria Bonn, the oldest Catholic student fraternity in the world. This speech motivated many Germanic students to such an extent that they decided to establish a fraternity that same evening. It was called Lovania, which is Latin for Leuven (Louvain). The fraternity quickly expanded and Prof. Thiéry became honorary president. Lovania continued to blossom until the outbreak of the First World War. In 1914 the fraternity was suspended due to the commencement of fighting. At that moment the fraternity already had more than 160 active and inactive members. Numerous members died on both sides of the war.

In post war Belgium, it was impossible to re-establish a German student fraternity in 1918. Promising efforts were made during 1927 and 1928 but failed after a short time. The Second World War made a quick re-establishment even more impossible. It took until 1996 until the political situation was stable enough to reconstitute the fraternity, within the Dutch-speaking Katholieke Universiteit te Leuven. At that moment many students who belonged to fraternities were members of the Cartellverband and studied in Louvain. The idea then arose to re-establish the fraternity. The last surviving member gave his blessing to this undertaking and on April 19, 1996, the reactivation became a reality. In 1999 the friendly affiliation to the Cartellverband was formally re-established. Today the fraternity flourishes and has over 137 members, originating from Flanders, the Netherlands, Germany, Austria, Switzerland, Poland, the United Kingdom, Ireland, Australia and the United States.

== Principles ==
Zirkel (monogram)

Lovania is founded upon three guiding principles:

- religio: the fraternity and all its members publicly adhere to the Roman Catholic faith
- scientia: the pursuit of an academic education for all of its members
- amicitia: a lifelong friendship between all the members of the fraternity as long as they live whilst demonstrating a strong esprit de corps

The members of Lovania do not practice academic fencing (Mensur) because it is forbidden by the Roman Catholic Church. Academic fencing is common with the more secular student fraternities in Germanic countries. Due to this restriction, Catholic students had to organize separate fraternities. Lovania only accepts men into the organization.

== Symbols ==
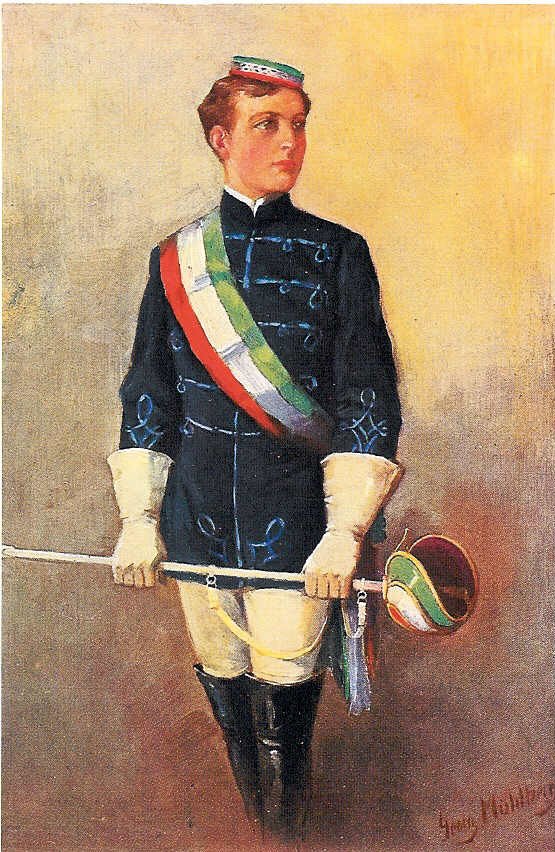
Vollwichs - Georg Mühlberg 'Zum ersten Mal in Wichs' (1900)

The fraternity's motto is Semper Excelsius! The official dress symbols, that are worn by each member, consist of a vertical green-white-red triband bordered with a golden thread and a green kepi, the historical military cap as worn during the American Civil War.

During official ceremonies and special occasions, the praesidium wears a dress uniform, a traditional Polish military uniform called a Vollwichs which consists mainly of a bekiesza.

== Governance ==
The fraternity has a legislative (the power to make laws), executive (the power to implement laws) and judiciary (the power to judge and apply punishment when laws are broken) body. All full members make up the legislative body, which elects the executive body. The legislative body also functions as a judiciary body. In this case, it assumes the function of an honorary senate.

== Notable members ==
- Prosper Poullet (December 9, 1871 - December 23, 1935) former prime minister of Belgium and Minister of State
- Pierre Prüm (July 9, 1886 – February 1, 1950) former prime minister of Luxemburg
- Alexander Count von Kolowrat (January 29, 1886 – December 4, 1927) founder of the Austrian movie industry
- Edmond de Goeyse (October 1, 1907 - December 21, 1998), Flemish student leader
- Albert Joseph Carnoy (November 7, 1878 - January 12, 1961), Belgian minister of internal affairs and health; professor of linguistics and comparative grammar, University of Louvain, Belgium
- Georges Baron Holvoet (August 16, 1874 - April 23, 1964), governor of the province of Antwerp and chef de cabinet of the Prince-regent Charles of Belgium
- Paul Lebeau (June 29, 1908 - October 18, 1982), chemist
- Albert Michotte (1881 - 1965), experimental psychologist
- Francis Aveling (1875-1941), psychologist and Catholic priest
- Etienne Orban de Xivry (February 18, 1885 - July 23, 1953), Belgian senator
- Jef van den Eynde (December 21, 1879 - April 12, 1929), member of the Council of Flanders during the First World War
- Charles Baron Woeste (February 26, 1837 - April 5, 1922), Belgian Minister of State
