= Rugby Club Leuven =

Belgian rugby union club, based in Leuven

Belgium
- Nickname: RCL
- Founded: 1983; 43 years ago
- Location: Leuven, Belgium
- Ground(s): Koetsweg 204A, 3010 Leuven
- Chairman: Sven Goeminne
- League: D1
- 2023-2024: 10th
Team kit

RC Leuven is a Belgian rugby club in Leuven.

== History ==
The club was founded in 1983.

In November 2022, the RC Leuven men's team was playing in the second division of rugby in Belgium.

In January 2023, the RC Leuven women's team was also playing in the second division, after having been relegated one year prior.
