= KDStV Alania-Bonn =

Catholic student fraternity in Germany

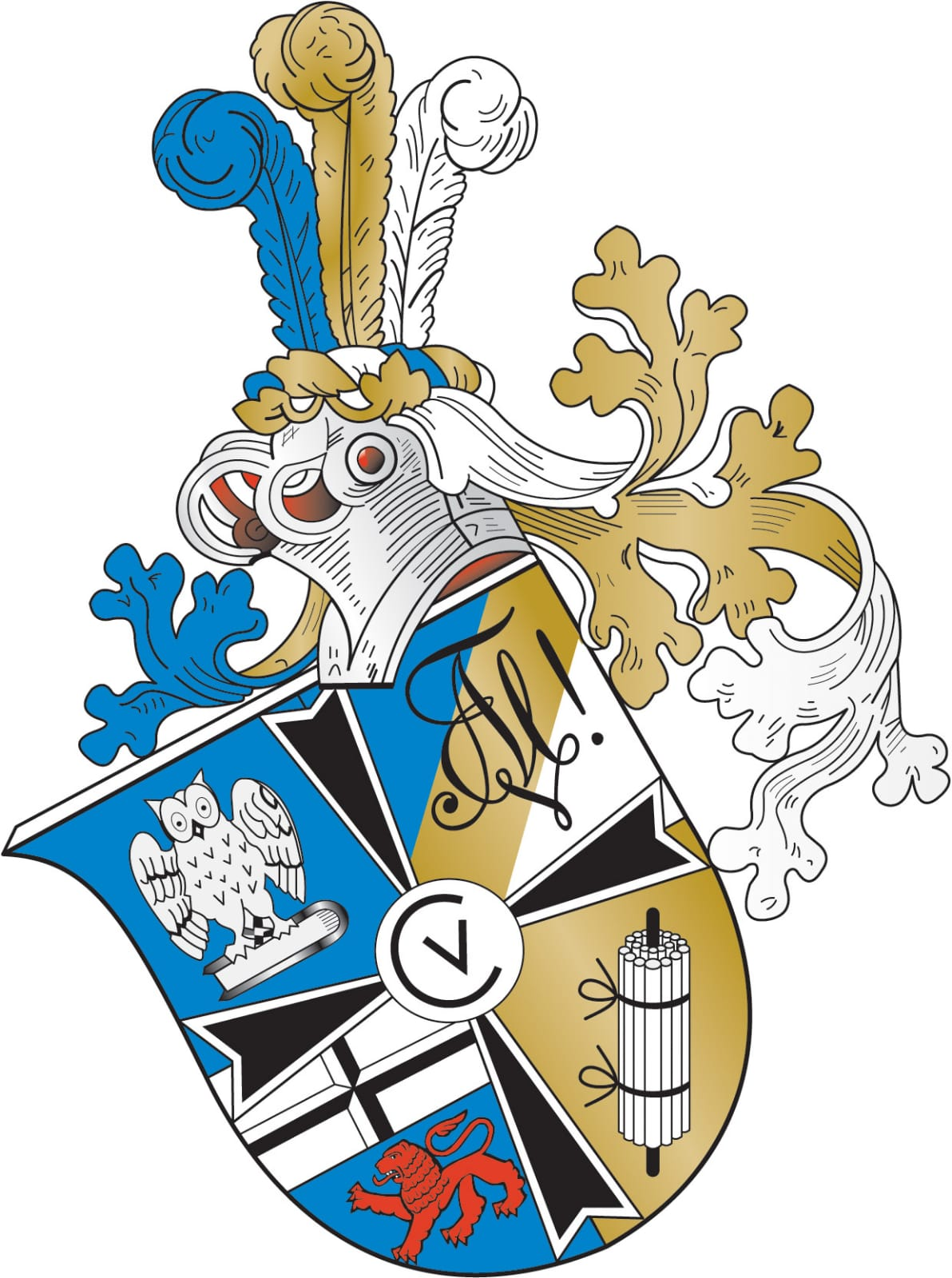
- Founded: March 1, 1905; 120 years ago Bonn, Germany
- Type: Studentenverbindung
- Affiliation: Cartellverband
- Status: Active
- Emphasis: Catholic, non-fencing
- Scope: Local
- Motto: Einig und Treu! "United and true"
- Pillars: Virtus, Scientia, and Amicitia
- Colors: Blue, Gold and White
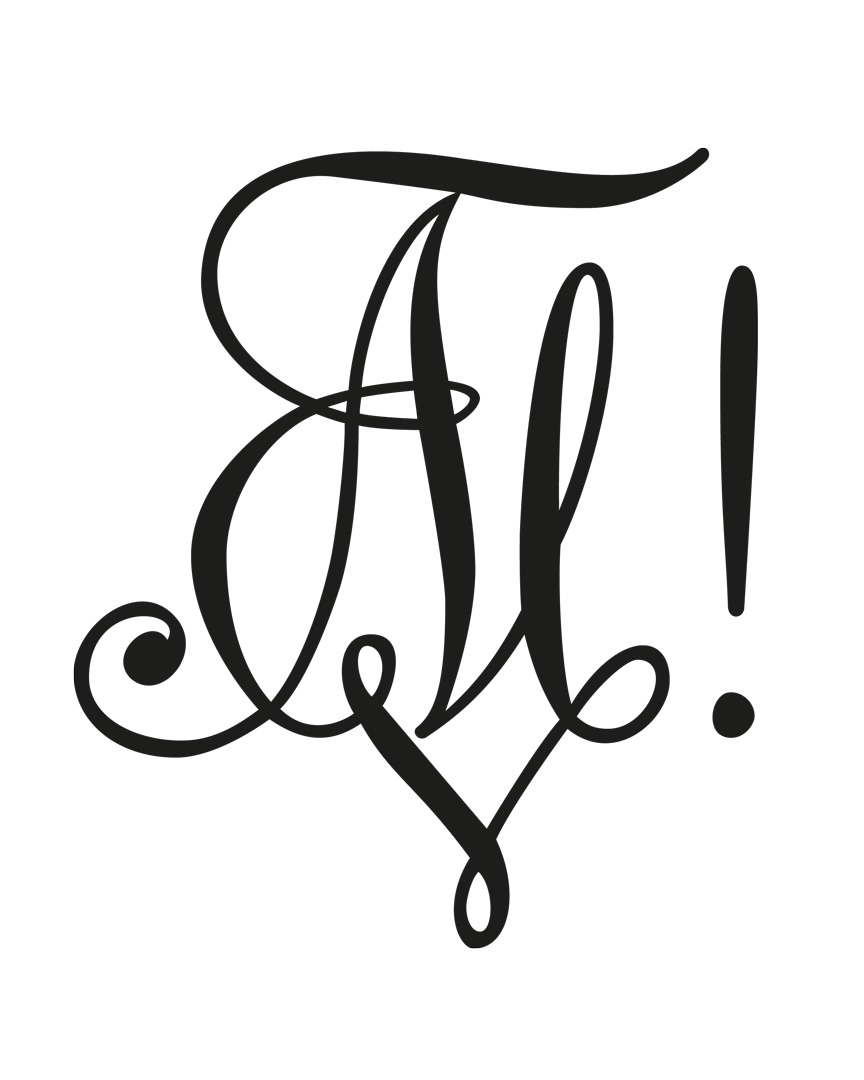
- Zirkel
- Chapters: 1
- Nickname: Alans
- Headquarters: Weberstrasse 23; Bonn, North Rhine-Westphalia 53113; Germany
- Website: alania-bonn.de

The Catholic German student fraternity Alania-Bonn (CV) is a non-fencing, colour-wearing, catholic fraternity located in Bonn, Germany. It was founded on 1 March 1905 as Unitas Alania and became a member of the Cartellverband in 1910.

== History ==
=== Foundation ===
Alania-Bonn was founded on 1 March 1905 in Bonn, Germany as Unitas Alania. It was created as non-fencing, colour-wearing, catholic student fraternity.

The KDStV Alania-Bonn was called Unitas Alania, because the mother corporation WKStV Unitas Salia had to register an unexpectedly high number of newly received foxes, whereupon the Alania founders Wilhelm Rombach and Wilhelm Lamberty made the request to divide the Salia and thus to found a new corporation. In August of the same year, the Alania was officially admitted to the Unitas Association.

=== Joining the CV ===
On 30 October 1906, the Burschenconvent of the Alania decided to introduce blue pub jackets for the Füxe. This contradicted the statute of the Unitas federation not to wear colors, thus triggering the so-called "first Unitas crisis". Due to the following disputes, the Alania resigned from the UV on 15 August 1908.

The newly constituted KDStV Alania joined the Cartellverband on 21 August 1910, to which it still belongs today.

=== 20th century ===
During World War I, the fraternity was largely dormant, with 28 Alans falling victim to it. In 1918, a new house was purchased at Weberstrasse 23, which, with interruptions, remains the headquarters of the fraternity to this day.

On 16 November 1927, the Alania and members of the KDStV Bavaria Bonn, founded the subsidiary corporation Borusso-Guestphalia or Senior Alaniae (later renamed Borusso-Westfalia)[8].

During the occupation of the Rhineland, in the course of which the just acquired house of the Alania was confiscated, there were some violent clashes between Alans and the occupying forces. These clashes resulted, among other things, in a color ban, which is why Bonn Alans subsequently wore a yellow carnation in their lapel.

After the seizure of power by Adolf Hitler, there were many discussions about the maintenance of the fraternity. Despite numerous reprisals, the fraternity existed until 1936. Later in 1940, an underground fraternity Conrübia (later Coronia) was founded together with members of the K.D.St.V. Novesia Bonn.

Shortly after the end of World War II, fraternity operations were resumed in 1946. After the house in the Weberstrasse was sold shortly before the expropriation and the Alanen resided from 1952 temporarily in the Arndtstrasse 5. It regained its house in the Weberstrasse in 1959.

=== 21st century ===
Due to financial and personnel problems, the Alania was unable to provide a senior in 2000 and was consequently suspended. However, the Altherrenschaft remained in existence, which is why the Alania was officially re-established in 2002 and was able to resume regular operations in the following years.

In 2008, Alania provided the suburb president together with Staufia, Novesia and Borusso-Westfalia. In 2022 Alania provided the suburb together with Novesia, Bavaria and Ripuaria. The Alania is co-founder and part of the movement "CV 2025", which wants to reorient the Cartellverband.

== Symbols ==
The name Alania goes back to an Iranian steppe people. The motto of the Alania-Bonn is Einig und Treu! or "United and true". Its princibles or pillars are

- Virtus: The courage to stand up for the virtues and traditions of the fraternity and to defend them.
- Scientia: The love for science.
- Amicitia: Lifelong friendship between members.

The members of the Alania wear "blue-gold-white" ribbons over their chest. New member ("Füxe") wear "blue-gold". The traditional headpiece for the Alania is a yellow hat. The colors of the fraternity ribbon go back to the colors of the Unitas Association, but were given new meaning for joining the CV, with blue and white representing the Blessed Virgin Mary and gold representing the Vatican. Blue pub jackets and lemon yellow plate caps are worn with the ribbons, and in rare cases yellow silk strikers (although these have been abolished twice in the course of the fraternity's history).

Since 2005, the Senior Alaniae wears the ribbon of honor of Borusso-Westfalia as a cross ribbon and vice versa.

== Notable members ==
- Franz Böckle (1921-1991), Rector of the Rheinische Friedrich-Wilhelms-Universität Bonn from 1983 to 1985
- Ludwig Kaas (1881-1952), Chairman of the Center Party
- Egbert Bülles (born 1946), Senior public Prosecutor and Human Rights Activist
- Heiner Koch (born 1954), auxiliary bishop in the archdiocese of Cologne (honorary member)
- Benedikt Vallendar (born 1969), Historian, author, Human Rights Activist and Journalist
- Dirk Wetzel (born 1961), economist, holder of the Jean Monnet Chair in European Economic Relations
- Matthias Wissmann (born 1949), president of the German Association of the Automotive Industry, former Federal Minister (honorary member)
- Jörg Krämer (born 1966), Chief economist of the Commerzbank AG
