= KDStV Teutonia =

Swiss student fraternity

- Tt
- Founded: November 4, 1890; 136 years ago University of Fribourg
- Type: Studentenverbindung
- Affiliation: CV
- Status: Active
- Emphasis: Catholic
- Scope: Local
- Motto: Concordia Crescimus "Together We Grow"
- Pillars: Amicitia, Scientia, Religio, Patria
- Colors: Blue, Gold and Red
- Chapters: 1
- Headquarters: Vallée du Gottéron 99; Fribourg CH- 1700; Switzerland
- Website: www.teutonia.ch

Katholische Deutsche Studentenverbindung Teutonia Freiburg i. Uechtland (KDStV Teutonia, English: Catholic German Student Association Teutonia Freiburg) is a Swiss Catholic student association or fraternity. It was founded in 1890 in Fribourg, Switzerland as a colour-wearing, non-fencing, academic association. It is a member of the Cartellverband, known as CV.

== History ==
Katholische Deutsche Studentenverbindung Teutonia Freiburg i. Uechtland (KDSTV Teutonia) was established on November 4, 1890 at the University of Fribourg in Fribourg, Switzerland. KDSTV Teutoniais a colour-wearing, non-fencing, Catholic academic student association or fraternity.

In 1890, KDSTV Teutonia became a member of the Cartellverband or the Union of Catholic German Student Fraternities known as CV. KDSTV Teutonia's headquarters are at Chemin du Gottéron 99 in Friboug, Switzerland.

== Symbols ==
KDSTV Teutonia's motto is Concordia Crescimus, roughly meaning "Together We Grow." Its pillars are Amicitia, Acientia, Religio, Patria (Friendship, Knowledge, Religion, Country).

KDSTV Teutonia official colors are blue-gold-red. Its fuxen, or pledges, wear blue-gold-blue. Its Zirkel, or monograph, consists of intertwined lines spelling v, c, f, or vivat, crescent, Floreat and is followed by an exclamation mark.

== See also ==
- List of member fraternities of the Cartellverband
