= KDStV Saarland Saarbrücken =

German Catholic student organization

- Founded: 18 July 1961; 64 years ago Saarland University
- Type: Studentenverbindung
- Affiliation: CV
- Status: Active
- Emphasis: Catholic
- Scope: Local
- Motto: Veritati et Caritati! "Devoted to truth and love"
- Pillars: Religio, Scientia, Amicitia, Patria
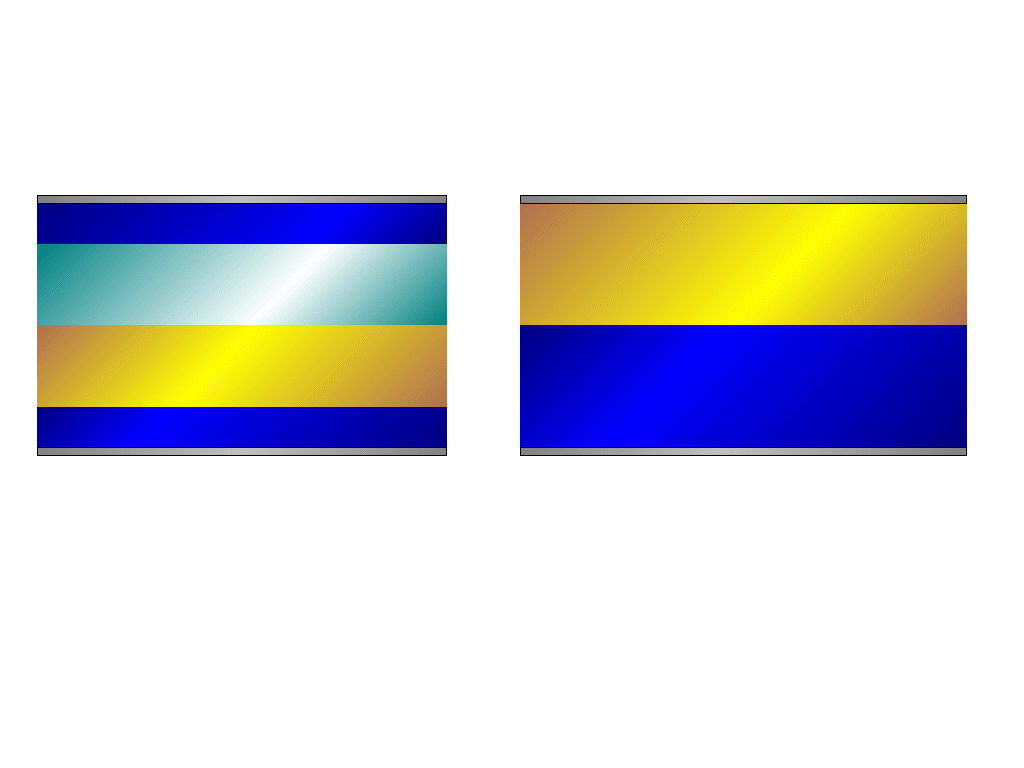
- Colors: Blue, White, Yellow, Blue

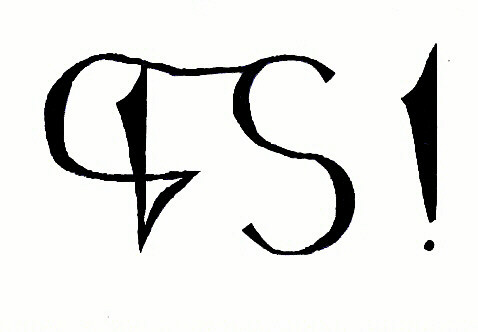
- Zirkel
- Chapters: 1
- Headquarters: Löbdergraben 9a Jena 07743; Germany
- Website: diesaarlanden.de

The Catholic German student corporation Saarland (Saarbrücken) Jena (German: Katholische Deutsche Studentenverbindung (K.D.St.V.) Saarland (Saarbrücken) Jena), founded in 1961, is a Catholic German academic fraternity. As all the other member fraternities of the Cartellverband (CV), the largest organization of academic persons in Germany, the members of the K.D.St.V. Saarland do not practice academic fencing (Mensur) because of their Catholic religion.

== History ==
The K.D.St.V. Saarland was established on 18 June 1961 as a spin-off of the fraternity K.D.St.V. Carolus Magnus Cartellverband at Saarland University. The final act of the foundation was the publication on 30 June 1962. The K.D.St.V. Saarland was separated from Carolus Magnus because of the significant effects of the referendum of 1955, concerning the Saar statute. With this referendum, the citizens of the Saarland had to decide whether to reunite the Saarland with Germany or to be an independent territory, governed by an elected government, in matters of foreign policy represented by a commissar of the Western European Union and with an economy connected to France. There were heavy arguments between the supporters of both solutions. The break ran through Families, clubs, and friendships and continued to exert an influence even after the conclusion of the referendum and the reunion to Germany. The newly founded K.D.St.V. Saarland was the result of such a break. Here mainly the supporters of the Europastatut tried to form a new fraternity, separated from the supporters of the reunion to Germany, who mainly stayed in the Carolus Magnus fraternity.

In 1962 an apartment at Saarbrücken's Graf-Johann-Street was rented, followed by an apartment at Mozartstreet. In 1983 the fraternity bought a house of its own at Akazienweg, still in Saarbrücken.

In 2006 the fraternity decided to change from Saarland University to the Friedrich Schiller University at Jena, a university full of the history and the traditions of fraternities. The Urburschenschaft, which was the first user of the colors black red, and gold, which later should form the flag of Germany and which was the first one of today's type of German fraternities, although many of them do not share her nationalistic principles and her academic fencing, was founded here. This place of great academic tradition fifteen years after the German reunification still did not contain a fraternity of the CV, the largest organization of German fraternities. K.D.St.V. Saarland is the only fraternity of the CV that ever moved from the western part of Germany to a place of the former German Democratic Republic. On 15 July 2006, the transfer was terminated and the fraternity moved into an apartment at Löbdergraben near the University of Jena.

== Symbols ==
The name of the fraternity Saarland remembers the state, where the fraternity was founded. The fraternity's motto is Veritati et Caritati! or "Devoted to truth and love".

The K.D.St.V. Saarland is based on four principles, it shares with all the fraternities of the CV:

- religio: the fraternity and all its members publicly adhere to the Roman Catholic faith;
- scientia: the pursuit of an academic education is common to all of its members;
- amicitia: a lifelong friendship among all the members of the fraternity for their whole lives;
- patria: patriotism towards the fatherland within a European context.

=== Colors ===
The colour, the K.D.St.V. Saarland uses for its flag and Uniforms and the caps and ribbons of its members are blue-white-yellow-blue. The colour used by temporary members are yellow and blue. The cap of the members is blue with a border of white and yellow surrounding the head. The colour white and yellow are those, representing the holy seat and the holy Roman Catholic church, and blue and white are the colour of the former principality of Nassau-Saarbrücken.

The ribbon of the K.D.St.V.Saarland is worn over the back side and front from the right shoulder to the left hip, except the "Ribbon of Honour", which is worn in addition to the usual ribbon from the left shoulder to the right hip. Only two members were awarded to wear an honorary ribbon, Hans Werner Westermann and Dr Bernd van der Felden.

=== Wichs ===
Die Wichs is a traditional academic dress uniform in Polish cavalry style. It is worn by representatives of the fraternity in formal situations. It consists of a Paradecerevis, a Pekesche, a sash, Zipfel, Schläger, white breeches, and riding boots.

- The Paradecerevis, a small visorless cap shows the basic colour of blue with the colors white and yellow, and the Zirkel, the insignia of the fraternity embedded in an oak wreath.
- The Pekesche is a white uniform, decorated with applications of cords in the colors of blue white, and yellow. It originates from the Polish bekiesza coat.
- A Zipfel is a decorative pendant made of two pieces of ribbon of different lengths with the colour of the fraternity lying on top of each other, connected by a piece of metal. They are worn on the left shoulder.
- The sash shows the colors of the fraternity. It is worn from the right shoulder to the left hip.
- The Schläger is a dull saber with a hilt, decorated in the colors of the fraternity. This saber is a symbol of academic liberty because, in the medieval age, only soldiers, noblemen, and members of the university were allowed to wear a saber

=== Coat of Arms ===
The coat of arms is parted by the cross. The left upper field shows the insignia of the fraternity. The right upper field shows the colors of the fraternity. The lower right field shows the coat of arms of the former town of St Johann, now part of Saarbrücken. The last field shows the lion of Nassau Saarbrücken.

=== Zirkel (insignia) ===
Der Saarlandenzirkel is a collegiate monogram of the four letters V, C, F, and S and an exclamation point. These letters represent the words vivat crescat floreat SAARLAND (Saarland bloom, grow, prosper). The exclamation point represents in aeternum and signifies the existence of members, still attending a university.

== Membership ==
Only Catholic men can be members of the K.D.St.V. Saarland. Besides a few exceptions, only students of the Friedrich Schiller University Jena can join the fraternity. Membership begins with the Fuchsenzeit, a time of probation of about six months. If the fraternity and the new member both decide to award full membership, this membership now lasts lifelong. Today the fraternity has 171 members.

The members are divided into Aktive, those who still are students, and Alte Herren, those who finished their studies. Alte Herren, a graduated students with regular income, provides a financial background. This usually means quite cheap housing for the younger members among other things.

The whole fraternity is directed by the Convent, general assemblies of the Aktive, or the whole fraternity. The board of directors is composed of five students, called the Chargenkabinett. The Chargenkabinett consists of

- The Senior (symbol = x), the chairman of the fraternity. He represents and manages the whole fraternity. He arranges the program and presides over its activities.
- The Consenior (symbol = xx), the deputy chairman of the fraternity. He substitutes for the Senior. He is responsible for the behavior of the members and represents the fraternity about the ladies, usually the wives and girlfriends of the members. For these, he arranges events as a ball.
- The Scriptor (symbol = xxx), the secretary of the fraternity. He keeps the records of the fraternity and executes the correspondence.
- The Quästor (symbol = xxxx), the treasurer of the fraternity. He is responsible for financial planning, collects the membership fee, and purchases new property.
- The Fuxmajor (Symbol = FM), the recruiter and instructor of the fraternity. He supervises the promotion of the fraternity and instructs the members on probation.

The Altherrenschaft is led by a board of four directors, the Philistersenior, the Philisterconsenior, the Philisterscriptor, and the Philisterquestor. They represent the Altherrenschaft within the fraternity.

The religious development is supported by a fraternity priest.

The fraternity activities contain usual activities such as lectures, guided tours, parties, and attending church. There are special events, Kommers and Kneipe, both historical ritualistic forms of festivities.

== Notable members ==
- Peter Jacoby, former secretary of finances and deputy prime minister of the Saarland.

== Literature ==
- K.D.St.V. Saarland Saarbrücken im CV Festschrift zum 25. Stiftungsfest
- Gesellschaft für Studentengeschichte und Studentisches Brauchtum e. V. (Hrsg), CV-Handbuch, 3. Auflage, Regensburg, 2000, ISBN 3-922485-11-1
