= Edmond de Goeyse =

Belgian activist

Edmond (Mon) the Goeyse, circa 1930

Dr. Edmond de Goeyse (1 October 1907 – 21 December 1998) was a Flemish student leader during the 1920s and 1930s. He was born in Antwerp.

He founded the pioneer student fraternity Bezem Lovania Brussel in 1925 and in 1927 he tried to reestablish the German fraternity K.A.V. Lovania Leuven, affiliated with the Cartellverband der katholischen deutschen Studentenverbindungen.

In 1929, he united all Flemish student clubs in the Seniorenkonvent (SK), a subdivision of the Katholiek Vlaams Hoogstudentenverbond (KVHV) and wrote the Belgian version of the clubcodex, currently still in use by most students from Flanders.

He died in Leuven, aged 91 in 1998.
