= Cartellverband =

German organization of student fraternities

Union of Catholic German Student Fraternities
- CV
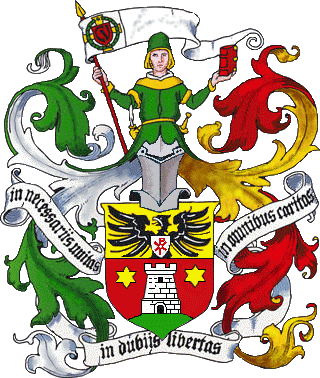
- Founded: December 6, 1856; 169 years ago Münster, Germany
- Type: Umbrella
- Affiliation: Independent
- Status: Active
- Emphasis: Catholic fraternities
- Scope: National
- Members: 123 + 4 (see Lov! or Sld!) active
- Headquarters: Linzer Str. 82; Bad Honnef 53604; Germany
- Website: www.cartellverband.de

The Union of Catholic German Student Fraternities (German: Cartellverband der katholischen deutschen Studentenverbindungen or Cartellverband, CV) is a German umbrella organization of Catholic male student fraternities (Studentenverbindung).

== History ==
=== Foundation ===
During the Kulturkampf (1871–1878), the Prussian state tried to reduce the influence of the Catholic Church. As a result of this, many Catholic organizations were founded in order to withstand this pressure by forming a single front.

Catholic students of several universities in Germany, Austria and Switzerland formed Catholic fraternities. These Catholic fraternities were the successors of informal Catholic clubs, founded by students of theology. They were formed according to the historic examples of the already existing fraternities, like wearing couleur, rules of behaviour, lifelong membership and democratic organization, but added as main principle the foundation upon the Catholic faith.

In 1851 in Munich a fraternity called Aenania München was founded. This fraternity tried to establish connections to other Catholic fraternities on other universities. On 6 December 1856, Aenania München formed an alliance with the newly founded Winfridia Breslau. This formal alliance was the birth of the Cartellverband. Both fraternities shared the same principles, religio, scientia et amicitia.

In 1864 Guestfalia Tübingen and Austria Innsbruck entered the Cartellverband. Later Bavaria Bonn founded in 1844, entered. In 1871 Alsatia Münster, renamed Saxonia Münster, and Markomannia Würzburg, Hercynia Freiburg im Breisgau in 1873, Suevia Berlin in 1876, Rhenania Marburg and Burgundia Leipzig, both in 1880 followed.

These new Catholic fraternities, called Studentenverbindungen, faced strong resistance of the older Corps and Burschenschaften and of the administrations of the universities as well. They were forbidden to wear their colors and one, Alsatia Münster even was forced to temporary suspend itself. Nevertheless, the Cartellverband showed a solid growth of membership.

In 1907 a fourth principle, patria, was added to the other three. Patria did not mean a limitation of membership to people of German, Austrian or Swiss origin, as several members from other countries, as Belgium, the Netherlands, and the United Kingdom show. For example, on 28 February 1905 the first American, Irville Charles LeCompte, later a professor at Yale, was accepted as a member of AV Rappoltstein, then in Strasbourg, now in Cologne (KDStV Rappoltstein).

Since its foundation, the Cartellverband only accepted into its structure one fraternity from every university, called the principle of singularity. Those fraternities, which were denied membership founded other umbrella organisations, like the Katholische Deutsche Verband farbentragender Studentenkorporationen (KDV), sharing the same principles as the CV. In 1907 the principle of singularity was abolished. Now the former members of these umbrella organisations could join the Cartellverband, which structure and membership exploded.

During the first years the member fraternities of the Cartellverband were forbidden to accept members without a certificate of having passed the Abitur, the German equivalent of a university entrance qualification. In these times this Abitur was not necessary to study on a technical university. The fraternities of these universities accepted such students. Those fraternities founded their own organizations because they could not gain membership in the Cartellverband. Because it abolished the precondition of Abitur in 1904, those fraternities could also join the Cartellverband. Shortly before World War I, former fraternities of the Unitas-Verband, like Alania Bonn and Cheruskia Tübingen also entered the Cartellverband.

Several small organizations, like the Österreichischer Cartellverband, the Cartell katholischer Verbindungen an Tierärztlichen Hochschulen, the Verband Katholischer Studentenvereine and the Cartell katholischer Verbindungen an Landwirtschaftlichen Hochschulen followed. Thus the Cartellverband became the largest organisation representing Catholic academics in Germany and Austria.

=== The academic Kulturkampf ===
The Catholic fraternities always faced reproaches to endanger the academic liberty with their Catholic faith, because as avowing Catholics they would be Ultramontanists, following orders from the other side of the mountain, which means from the Vatican on the other side of the Alps. Therefore, they were declared enemies of the Empire. During the Kulturkampf (1872–1887) the few fraternities of the CV could not ply a significant part. During the academic Kulturkampf of 1903–1908 the situation had changed. Now the Catholic fraternities were a main target of the attacks of nationalistic and liberal fraternities.

7199 members of the CV served in World War I. 1282 of them, more than 15% of the whole members died. After World War I the CV was spread on seven states, Germany, Austria, Switzerland, France, Poland, Czechoslovakia and Romania, but soon the fraternities of Strasbourg had to leave Alsace. Having shared the bloodshed of World War I the catholic and non confessional fraternities put an end to their quarrels by signature of the Erlangener Verbände- und Ehrenabkommen ('Treaty of honour between academic organizations of Erlangen') in 1921. Now all fraternities treated each other as equals.

=== White Ring ===
The so-called White Ring was an organisation within the CV, existing from 1908 until 1923. The members were the fraternities Bavaria Bonn, Burgundia München, Ripuaria Freiburg im Breisgau, and Zollern Münster. Some other fraternities sympathized with them, for example Guestfalia Tübingen, Rheno-Palatia Breslau, Rheno-Franconia München and Marco-Danubia Wien.

When in 1912 the CV decided that all Cartellbrüder (members of different fraternities of the CV) had to call each other Du (an address used in families and among close friends), a treatment comparable to call someone by first name, these fraternities rejected the request. Because they were denied to use the Sie (a formal address, directed to strangers, especially superior persons) to address a Cartellbruder, they decided to call the Bundesbrüder, the members of the own fraternity, Sie. The formal sign of the white ring was a white carnation. This was terminated by the Cartellversammlung of 1923, where these practices were forbidden.

=== National Socialism and WWII ===
The Cartellversammlung of 1932 forbade the members of the CV fraternities to be member of the NSDAP as well, because the German bishops opposed the NSDAP. One year later, the relations between the German state and the Vatican were cleared by the Reichskonkordat. Now there was no more reason to deny membership in a party the Holy See had relations with. The same day members already wore uniforms of the SA and the SS. Beginning in 1933 there was a process of Gleichschaltung ('alignment'). The fraternities had to develop a principle of leadership similar to the party organizations of the NSDAP and connection to the national socialist student community. As a reaction to these proceedings, the Austrian fraternities and those in Czechoslovakia split off. They founded the Österreichischen Cartellverband der katholischen deutschen Studentenverbindungen (ÖCV) on 10 July 1933, and the Sudetendeutscher Cartellverband der farbentragenden katholischen deutschen Studentenverbindungen (SCV) on 14 June 1933. They were to never reunite.

On 31 January 1934 the leadership of the CV declared the Catholic orientation of the CV to be terminated. On 27 October 1935 the Cartellversammlung decided to close the CV. Now only the fraternity Teutonia Fribourg in Switzerland survived. On 20 June 1938 the remaining structures of the CV were eliminated by order of Heinrich Himmler, the leader of the SS. All property of the former fraternities was confiscated. Although the fraternities did not exist any more, many of the former members tried to find informal ways to live their academic traditions. There was no unitary attitudes. Among the members of the CV were culprits and victims of the National Socialism alike.

=== After World War II ===
After the war, the fraternities tried to re-establish themselves. This was a difficult and very painful process. Victims of the Nazi tyranny met those who destroyed their fraternities or even participated in crimes. In 1950 the CV was re-established, but it had changed. The fraternities in Austria did not return, those in the German Democratic Republic, Poland, Czechoslovakia and Ukraine had to search for a new location within West Germany or Austria.

The CV and the ÖCV, the organization of the Austrian Fraternities and the Student organization of Switzerland formed friendship with a contract on 10 February 1963 at Innsbruck. The CV is a founding member of the European Federation of Christian Students' Associations in 1975. It is also member of the consortium of Catholic Organizations (AGV), of the Pax Romana - International Catholic Movement for Intellectual and Cultural Affairs and the Catholic of Germany and several other organizations.

Today the German (CV) and Austrian (ÖCV) Cartellverband together unite more than 177 active and 12 inactive German student fraternities in Germany, Austria, Switzerland, Belgium, Hungary, Italy, Japan, Poland, Slovakia and Syria. Today, they represent 42,000 academics throughout the world. For examples of member fraternities, see K.A.V. Lovania Leuven or Catholic German student corporation Saarland (Saarbrücken) Jena.

== Organisation ==
The Cartellverband is a confederation of individual fraternities with equal principals, in a subsidiary relation, which means that the fraternities have the greatest possible autonomy, within the framework of the basic principles of the Cartellverband.

All the member fraternities share equal rights and duties, especially equal voting rights. Only in matters of protocol, a distinction is made on the basis of the historic date of membership of the Cartellverband. Individual persons can not become a member of the Cartellverband.

All the Aktivitates (an Aktivitas is the entirety of the members of a single fraternity, still member of the university) of the single fraternities together form the Studentenbund, the Altherrenschaft (Altherrenschaft is the entirety of the members of a fraternity who finished their studies) together form the Altherrenbund.

If there are several member fraternities in a town, these are to form Ortsverbände, local divisions of the CV to coordinate their connections and their exterior view. For example, there are Ortsverbände at Aachen (7 fraternities), Darmstadt (3), Freiburg im Breisgau (6), Hanover (3), Cologne (7), Munich–Freising–Weihenstephan (10), Münster (7), Würzburg (6,) Mainz, (3), Frankfurt (4), Heidelberg (2), Berlin (4), Bonn (8) and Erlangen–Nuremberg (3).

=== Member fraternities ===
The development of membership:

Before the split off of 1933

- 1869: 4 fraternities with 566 members
- 1875: 8 fraternities with 840 members
- 1880: 11 fraternities with 1,223 members
- 1885: 16 fraternities with 1,577 members
- 1890: 18 fraternities with 2,011 members
- 1895: 21 fraternities with 2,773 members
- 1900: 30 fraternities with 4,039 members
- 1905: 50 fraternities with 6,197 members
- 1910: 67 fraternities with 8,966 members
- 1915: 80 fraternities with 12,398 members
- 1920: 95 fraternities with 14,991 members
- 1925: 113 fraternities with 19,840 members
- 1931: 123 fraternities with 26,746 members

After the split off without the members of the ÖCV

- 1950: 95 fraternities with 17,308 members
- 1955: 105 fraternities with 24,744 members
- 1960: 108 fraternities with 29,531 members
- 1965: 111 fraternities with 33,224 members
- 1970: 114 fraternities with 34,843 members
- 1975: 117 fraternities with 33,488 members
- 1980: 116 fraternities with 32,108 members
- 1985: 116 fraternities with 31,872 members
- 1990: 120 fraternities with 32,081 members
- 1995: 122 fraternities with 31,499 members
- 1998: 119 fraternities with 32,104 members
- 2005: 126 fraternities with 29,827 members

=== Regional groups (Zirkel) ===
In about 247 locations in Germany and Austria, and in Brussels, Luxembourg, Paris and New York there are regional groups of individual members of fraternities of the Cartellverband called Zirkel. These offer the regular possibility for individual members, living far from their fraternity, to keep contact to other members who live nearby.

The oldest Zirkel, founded 1876 in Koblenz is called Confluentia Koblenz.

=== Legislative institutions ===
The supreme legislative institution is the Cartellversammlung (C.V.), the assembly of all the member fraternities of the Cartellverband. It is composed of two chambers, the Studentenbund and the Altherrenbund, representing students and alumni. Each fraternity has one vote. In addition to the meetings, the programme during a Cartellversammlung consists of a ball, a Kommers and a Holy Mass on Sunday. For spouses of members and girlfriends, there is a parallel cultural program.

=== Executive institutions ===
Superior executive institution is the CV-Rat (CV Council). Chairman is the chairman of the executive committee of the Altherrenbund. The other Members are the Vorortspräsident (the chairman of the Aktive) and two elected members, one elected by the Alte Herren, one elected by the Aktive. There are several other institutions as the department of pastoral care, the department of treasure, the department of academic education and the legal department.

Every year another fraternity or local group of fraternities presides the CV. They form the Vorortspräsidium (executive committee of the Aktive), consisting of the president the vice president and heads of the divisions social policy, press and publicity, foreign contacts and finance. This Vorort also represents the whole Cartellverband. The executive committee of the Altherrenbund, a president, and several heads of regional divisions is elected for therms of four years.

=== Judicial institutions ===
The Cartellverband has its own courts on fraternity, regional and national level. These function as an honorary Senate.

=== Academia ===
Der Cartellverband is publisher of a magazine, called Academia, which is published five times a year. This magazine was founded in 1888.

=== Foundations and organizations ===
- The CV-Akademie, an educational institution.
- The Eugen Bolz Stiftung, supports the democratic education of academic students.
- The Felix Porsch-Johannes Denk Stiftung, gives financial support to the education of young scientists in and outside Germany.
- The Alfons Fleischmann Stiftung, helps constructing dormitories to universities on the territory of the former German Democratic Republic.
- Working with the catholic churches in Africa, the CV-Africa Hilfe supports projects in Africa and helps African students to attend European universities by giving them alimentation.

== Principles ==
Nearly every fraternity of the Cartellverband is founded upon four guiding principles:

- religio: the fraternity and all its members publicly adhere to the Roman Catholic faith;
- scientia: the pursuit of an academic education is common to all of its members;
- amicitia: a lifelong friendship between all the members of the fraternity as long as they live;
- patria: patriotism towards the fatherland within a European context.

The fraternities of the Cartellverband historically do not practise academic fencing (Mensur) because it was forbidden by the Roman Catholic Church. Academic fencing is common with the more liberal student fraternities that already existed in German-speaking countries. Owing to this restriction, Catholic students had to organize themselves in separate fraternities. The fraternities only accept men into the organization.

== Symbols ==
=== Motto ===
The motto of CV: In necessariis unitas, in dubiis libertas, in omnibus caritas ('In essentials, unity; in doubtful matters, liberty; in all things, charity').

This was a phrase used by Christian Irenics, and has been traced to Rupert Melden in Paraenesis votiva pro Pace Ecclesiae ad Theologos Augustanae Confessionis, Auctore Ruperto Meldenio Theologo (62 pp. in 4to, without date and place of publication_. It probably appeared in 1627 at Frankfort-on-the-Oder, which was at that time the seat of theological moderation. Melden was a Lutheran, but the motto has also been used by the catholic Church, such as in Pope John XXIII's first encyclical, Ad Petri Cathedram of 1959. The English version is also frequently used by British Freemasons.

=== Coat of Arms ===
The coat of arms was designed in 1921 by Joseph Weiß and Philipp Schumacher. It shows a shield, parted; on gold a black eagle with a white shield on his breast, the old sign of Christ, Chi-Rho, within; on red a green hill with a white tower and a golden star on each side.

A Helmet with a medieval student on top, in a green coat, doubled gold and yellow, a sword on his right side. In the left hand, he has a flag with a golden cross on a red shield containing the letters C and V surrounded by a green wreath. In the left hand he has a red book. The mantling is made in the colors green doubled silver on the left side, doubled red and gold on the right side. In the mantling is a white ribbon with the motto.

- The tower represents the inner strength through unity, confirmed by the Cartellverband. It represents friendship (amiticia) in a shared belief (religio).
- The eagle represents the principle of patria, being an imperial bird.
- The scholar with flag and book represents the academic.
- The two stars represent the two founding members, who share these colors gold and green with each other and the Cartellverband.

=== Anthem ===
The Cartellverband has an official anthem, called Laßt ihr buntbemützten Scharen. The text was written by Heinrich Gassert, a member of Hercynia Freiburg im Breisgau, in 1885, the melody was adopted from the former popular song Strömt herbei ihr Völkerscharen, composed by Peter Johannes Peters in 1867. It has six strophes, which are following:

1. Laßt Ihr buntbemützten Scharen schallen euren Festgesang, aus dem Liede der Scholaren töne laut der Freiheit Klang! Singet deutscher Art zum Preise drum ein rechtes Burschenlied, durch des' Wort und durch des' Weise frisch der Hauch der Freiheit zieht.
2. Singt zum Preise Eurer Farben, die der Schönheit Glanz verklärt! Was die Neider dran verdarben, nicht des Scheltens ist es wert. Unsre Farben, die wir tragen, schmücken unsrer Ehre Schild. Sind nach außen drum geschlagen, weil's ihn blank zu halten gilt.
3. Greift die Freundschaft hoch zu preisen, in die Saiten tief und voll, Freundschaft muß die Losung heißen, wenn der Bund bestehen soll. Deutsche Freundschaft sich bewähret, sie ist treu bis in den Tod, und die Liebe sie verkläret, wie den Fels das Abendrot.
4. Auf das Auge zu den Sternen, auf den Blick zum Himmelszelt, wo ein Gott in heil'gen Fernen Eures Bundes Banner hält. Auf zum heil'gen Fahneneide, hebt die Bruderhand und schwört, daß dem Gott im Sternenkleide ewig Euer Herz gehört!
5. Tretet her, Ihr Musensöhne, an des Wissens heil'gen Born; Schöpft das Gute, trinkt das Schöne aus der Weisheit Wunderhorn. Bringt der Schönheit Eure Liebe als ein reines Opfer dar, legt des Herzens beste Triebe auf der Wahrheit Hochaltar.
6. Reicht die Hand Euch, Ihr vom Rheine, Ihr vom Neckar, Ihr vom Main, Ihr vom schroffen Alpenstein, ihr vom grünen Eichenhain. Euer Burschenwort zum Pfande, laßt es schallen himmelwärts: Unserm deutschen Vaterlande, unsre Hand und unser Herz.

== Notable members ==
Only fraternities are members of the Cartellverband, in the strict sense of the word. A complete list of all fraternities that are members of the German (CV) and Austrian (ÖCV) Cartellverband, can be found at List of member fraternities of the Cartellverband.

These following persons are living or deceased members of one of these fraternities that make up the Cartellverband. They are called Cartellbrüder.

=== Living members ===
- Cardinal Oscar Andrés Rodríguez Maradiaga archbishop of Tegucigalpa
- Cardinal Christoph Schönborn archbishop of Vienna
- Cardinal Walter Kasper president of the Pontifical Council for Promoting Christian Unity
- Cardinal Friedrich Wetter former archbishop of Munich
- Cardinal Reinhard Marx archbishop of Munich
- Cardinal Jean-Claude Hollerich archbishop of Luxembourg
- Gebhard Fürst bishop of Rottenburg-Stuttgart
- Prince Hans-Adam II von und zu Liechtenstein
- Franz Fischler former European commissioner
- Edmund Stoiber former minister-president of Bavaria
- Jürgen Rüttgers former minister-president of North Rhine-Westphalia
- Josef Pühringer prime minister of Upper-Austria
- Herwig van Staa former prime minister of Tirol
- Armin Laschet regional minister of North Rhine-Westphalia
- Erwin Teufel former minister-president of Baden-Württemberg
- Matthias Wissmann former transport minister of Germany
- Friedrich Merz German politician
- Othmar Karas Austrian member of the European parliament
- Andreas Khol Austrian politician
- Anton Zeilinger Austrian professor of physics
- Wolfgang Schuster mayor of Stuttgart
- Reinhold Ewald German astronaut
- Thomas Gottschalk German TV host
- Christoph Metzelder German soccer player
- Elmar Mäder former commander of the Swiss Guard at Vatican City
- Matthias Storme Flemish professor of law
- Alexander Tschugguel anti-abortion activist

=== Holy members ===
- Saint Józef Bilczewski former archbishop of Lemberg
- Blessed Cardinal Clemens August Graf von Galen former bishop of Münster
- Blessed Rupert Mayer SJ former German priest and anti-Nazi, resistance member
- Blessed Jakob Kern OPraem

=== Deceased members ===
- Pope Benedict XVI
- Pope Pius XII
- Cardinal Aloisius Joseph Muench former bishop of the Roman Catholic Diocese of Fargo, North Dakota
- Cardinal Julius Döpfner former archbishop of Munich and Freising
- Cardinal Joseph Wendel former archbishop of Munich
- Cardinal Josef Frings former archbishop of Cologne
- Cardinal Joseph Höffner former archbishop of Cologne
- Cardinal Franz König former archbishop of Vienna
- Cardinal Theodor Innitzer former archbishop of Vienna
- Cardinal Corrardo Bafile former president of the Congregation for the Causes of Saints
- Cardinal Leo Scheffczyk
- Cardinal Antonio Agliardi
- Hubertus Brandenburg former bishop of Stockholm
- Archduke Otto von Habsburg heir to the throne of Austria, Hungary, Bohemia and Moravia
- Kurt Waldheim former secretary general of the United Nations and former president of Austria
- Prince Takamado of Japan
- Heinrich Brüning former chancellor of Germany
- Wilhelm Cuno former chancellor of Germany
- Karl Arnold former minister-president of North Rhine-Westphalia
- Heinrich Lübke former president of Germany
- Wilhelm Miklas former president of Austria
- Thomas Klestil former president of Austria
- Constantin Fehrenbach former chancellor of Germany
- Georg von Hertling former chancellor of Germany
- Ignaz Seipel former chancellor of Austria
- Otto Ender former chancellor of Austria
- Carl Vaugoin former chancellor of Austria
- Engelbert Dollfuß former chancellor of Austria
- Kurt Schuschnigg former chancellor of Austria
- Leopold Figl former chancellor of Austria
- Julius Raab former chancellor of Austria
- Josef Klaus former chancellor of Austria
- Prosper Poullet former prime minister of Belgium
- Pierre Prüm former prime minister of Luxembourg
- Franz Josef Strauß former minister-president of Bavaria
- Eugen Bolz former minister-president of Württemberg
- Silvius Magnago former governor of South Tyrol
- Philipp von Boeselager former German lieutenant and conspirator against Hitler
- John Pius Boland former Irish politician and Olympic tennis champion
- Edmund Forschbach former German politician and CV leader
- Hans Globke former German politician
- Ludwig Windthorst former German politician
- Herman von Mallinckrodt former German politician
- Karl Lueger former mayor of Vienna
- Richard Schmitz former mayor of Vienna
- Sascha Kolowrat-Krakowsky former Austrian director
- Reinhold Frank former German lawyer and Nazi resistance member
- Edmond de Goeyse former Flemish journalist
- Rainer Barzel former President of the Bundestag
- Richard Stücklen former President of the Bundestag
- Götz Briefs former German social theorist and political economist
- Albert Michotte former Belgian psychologist
- Wilhelm Killing former German mathematician
- Wilhelm Schmidt former German linguist, anthropologist, and ethnologist
- Alfons Maria Jakob former German neurologist
- Prince Katsura of Japan
- Cardinal Peter Shirayanagi former archbishop of Tokyo
- Fritz Wittmann German politician
- Klaus Kinkel former foreign minister of Germany
- Alois Mock former foreign minister of Austria
- Philipp Jenninger former President of the Bundestag (speaker of German parliament)

=== Expelled members ===
- Taras Borodajkewycz Austrian professor
- Germar Rudolf German Holocaust denier

== Relations ==
=== Friendly relations ===
The Cartellverband has friendly relations with other umbrella organisations:

- Europäischer Kartellverband (EKV) : European umbrella organisation
- Katholiek Vlaams Hoogstudentenverbond (KVHV) : Flemisch umbrella organisation
- Kartellverband katholischer deutscher Studentenvereine (KV) : German umbrella organisation
- Cartellverband der katholischen österreichsichen Studentenverbindungen Austrian umbrella organisation.
- Schweizerischer Studentenverein (StV) : Swiss umbrella organisation
- Technischer Cartell-Verband (TCV) : German umbrella organisation
- Unitas-Verband der wissenschaftlichen katholischen Studentenvereine (UV): German umbrella organisation

=== Competing organisations ===
Other competing umbrella organisations of German student fraternities exist, founded upon different guiding principles:

- Coburger Convent : conservative
- Deutsche Burschenschaft : nationalist
- Kösener Senioren-Convents-Verband : liberal
- Weinheimer Senioren-Convent : liberal

== See also ==
- Burschenschaft
- Corps
- Landsmannschaft
- Turnerschaft
