= Hochfirst (Black Forest) =

Mountain in Germany

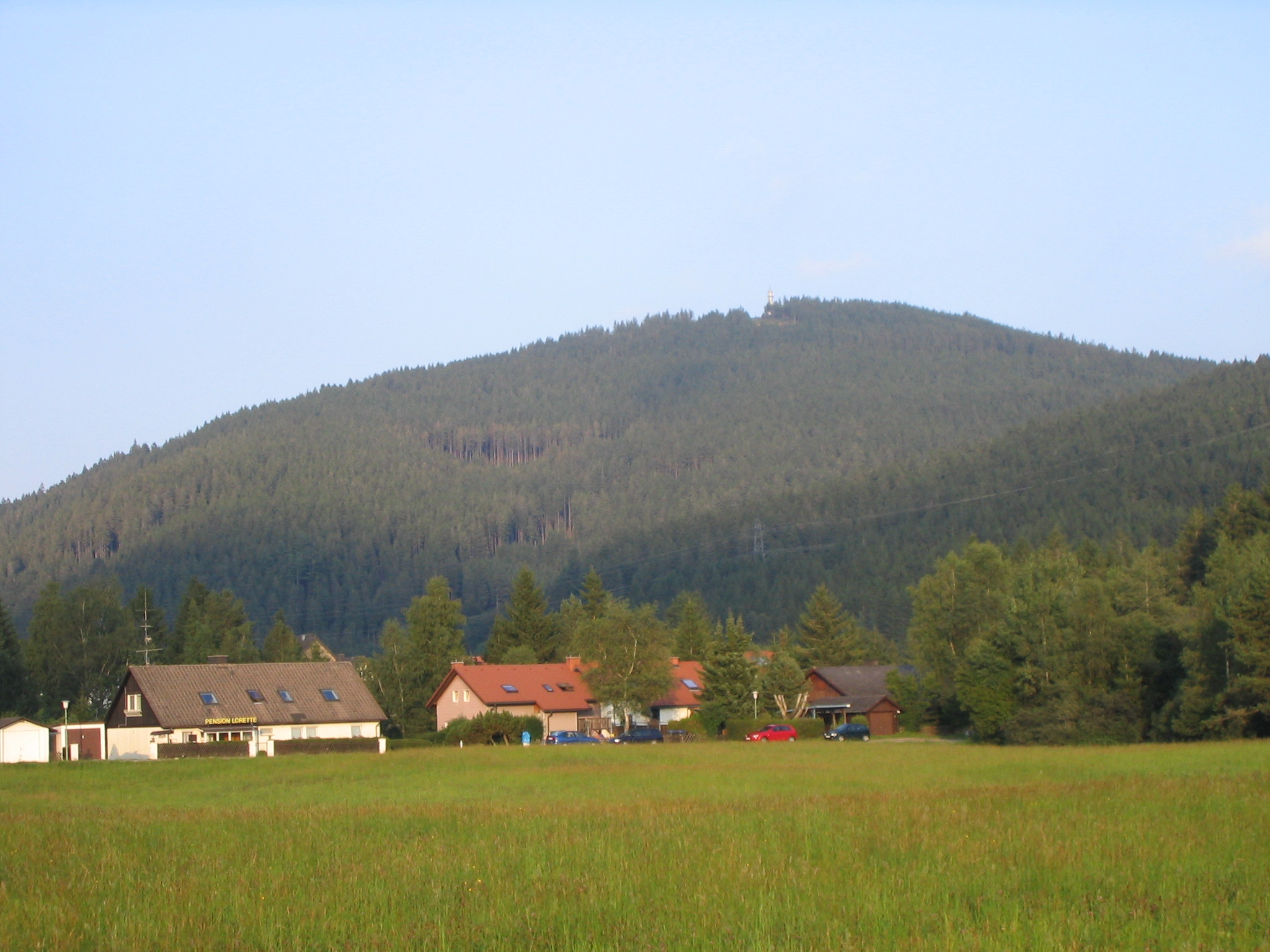
- September 2005 view from Titisee of the Hochfirst

Highest point
- Elevation: 1,190 m (3,900 ft)
- Coordinates: 47°54′03″N 08°11′06″E

Geography
- Location within Baden-Württemberg
- Location: Baden-Württemberg, Germany

The Hochfirst is a wooded mountain between Saig and Titisee-Neustadt in the Black Forest in Germany with a height of 1,190.1 m above sea level (NHN).

== Location and surrounding area ==
The mountain is located on the municipal boundary between Lenzkirch and Titisee-Neustadt. On the Hochfirst are a restaurant and an observation tower. From the top there is a view of the nearby Titisee and the Feldberg. In clear weather the Swiss and Austrian Alps may be seen and, in exceptional conditions, even the French Alps as far as the Italian border including Mont Blanc.

== Viewing tower ==
The Hochfirst Tower (Hochfirstturm), built in 1890 as a steel lattice tower, is 25 metres high and stands on a natural stone base. This pedestal was part of the original wooden tower built in 1888 that was the victim of a hurricane in 1890. Today the tower bears antennas for microwave and mobile phone communications. Unusually the Hochfirst Tower is tensioned by guy wires. Since 1989 it has been a listed building. From May 2014 to March 2015 the tower was closed due to stability problems.

== Routes to the summit ==
The Hochfirst may be climbed on the Freiburg-Lake Constance Black Forest Trail (Schwarzwald-Querweg Freiburg–Bodensee) from Titisee or the Central Way (Mittelweg) from Neustadt. The shortest route runs from Saig to the summit. There is also a road to the Hochfirst Tower from Neustadt.

== Winter sport ==
The Hochfirst has its own ski jump, the Hochfirstschanze, which hosts World Cup ski jumping. Along the southeastern slopes of the mountain there is also a cross country skiing loipe, the Hochfirstspur (9.9 km long, height 910–1,057 m, start and finish near the church in Saig, classic style). A toboggan run runs down the western mountainside of the Hochfirst from Saig to the shores of Lake Titisee.

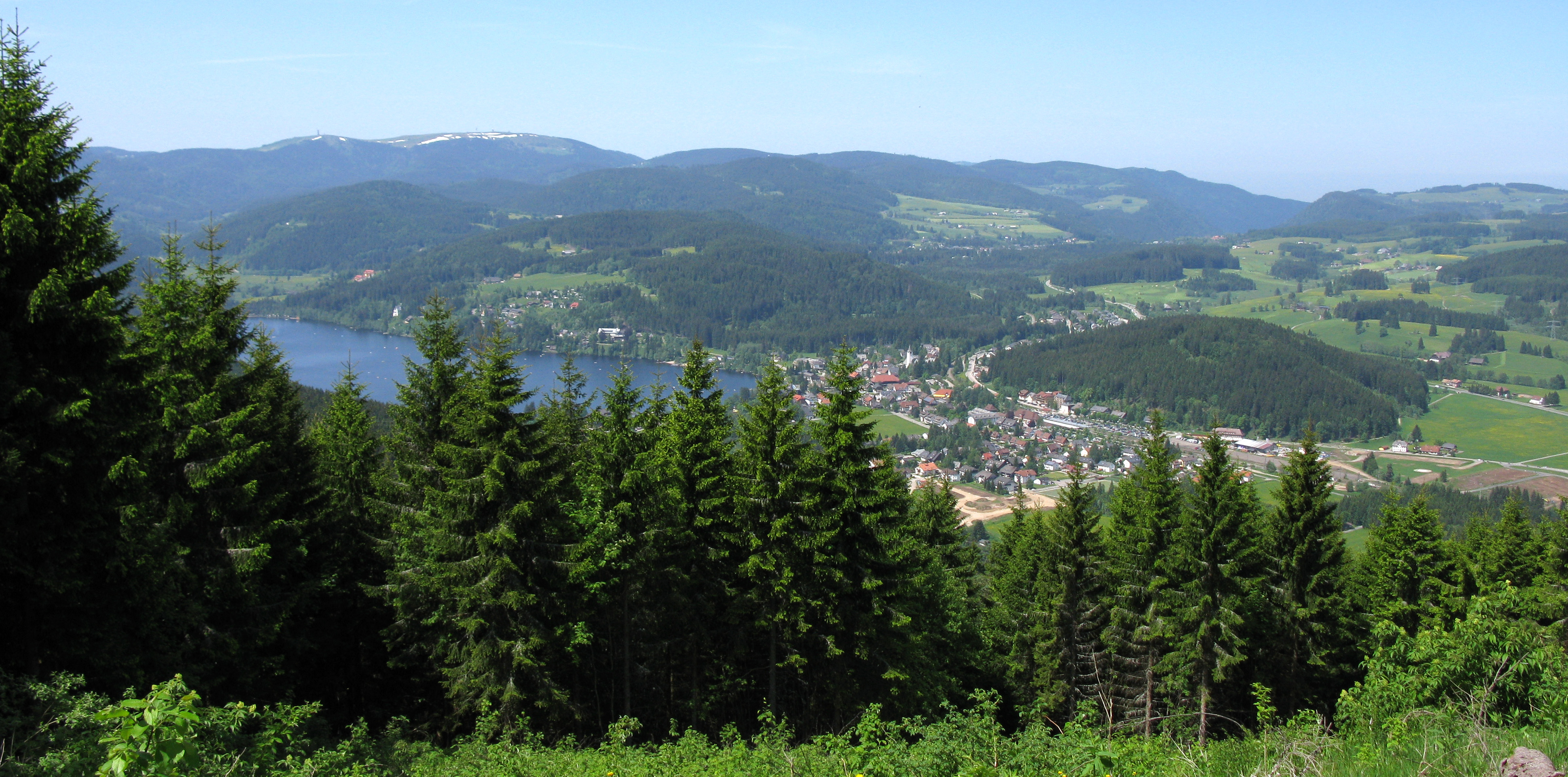
Panoramic view from the Hochfirst of the Feldberg massif, Lake Titisee and its eponymous resort
