= Titisee-Neustadt =

- Town
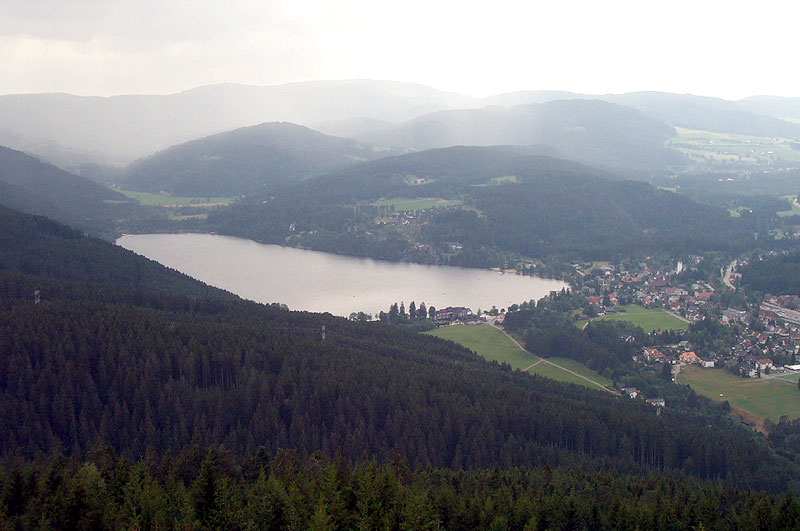
- August 2003 view of Titisee from the Mount Hochfirst

- Coat of arms

- Location of Titisee-Neustadt within Breisgau-Hochschwarzwald district
- Interactive map of Titisee-Neustadt
- Location within Germany Location within Baden-Württemberg
- Coordinates: 47°54′44″N 8°12′53″E
- Country: Germany
- State: Baden-Württemberg
- Admin. region: Freiburg
- District: Breisgau-Hochschwarzwald
- Subdivisions: 6

Government
  - Mayor (2023–31): Gerrit Reeker

Area
  - Total: 89.64 km^{2} (34.61 sq mi)
- Elevation: 849 m (2,785 ft)

Population (2025-12-31)
  - Total: 12,873
  - Density: 143.6/km^{2} (371.9/sq mi)
- Time zone: UTC+01:00 (CET)
  - Summer (DST): UTC+02:00 (CEST)
- Postal codes: 79811–79822
- Dialling codes: 07651
- Vehicle registration: FR
- Website: www.titisee.de

Titisee-Neustadt (German pronunciation: [ˌtɪtizeːˈnɔʏʃtat]) is a municipality in the district of Breisgau-Hochschwarzwald in Baden-Württemberg in southern Germany. It is made up of the six Stadtteile (quarters) of Neustadt, Langenordnach, Rudenberg, Titisee, Schwärzenbach and Waldau.

The town of Neustadt is a spa known for its Kneipp hydrotherapeutic and curative methods. Furthermore, it is a winter sport center.

== Geography ==
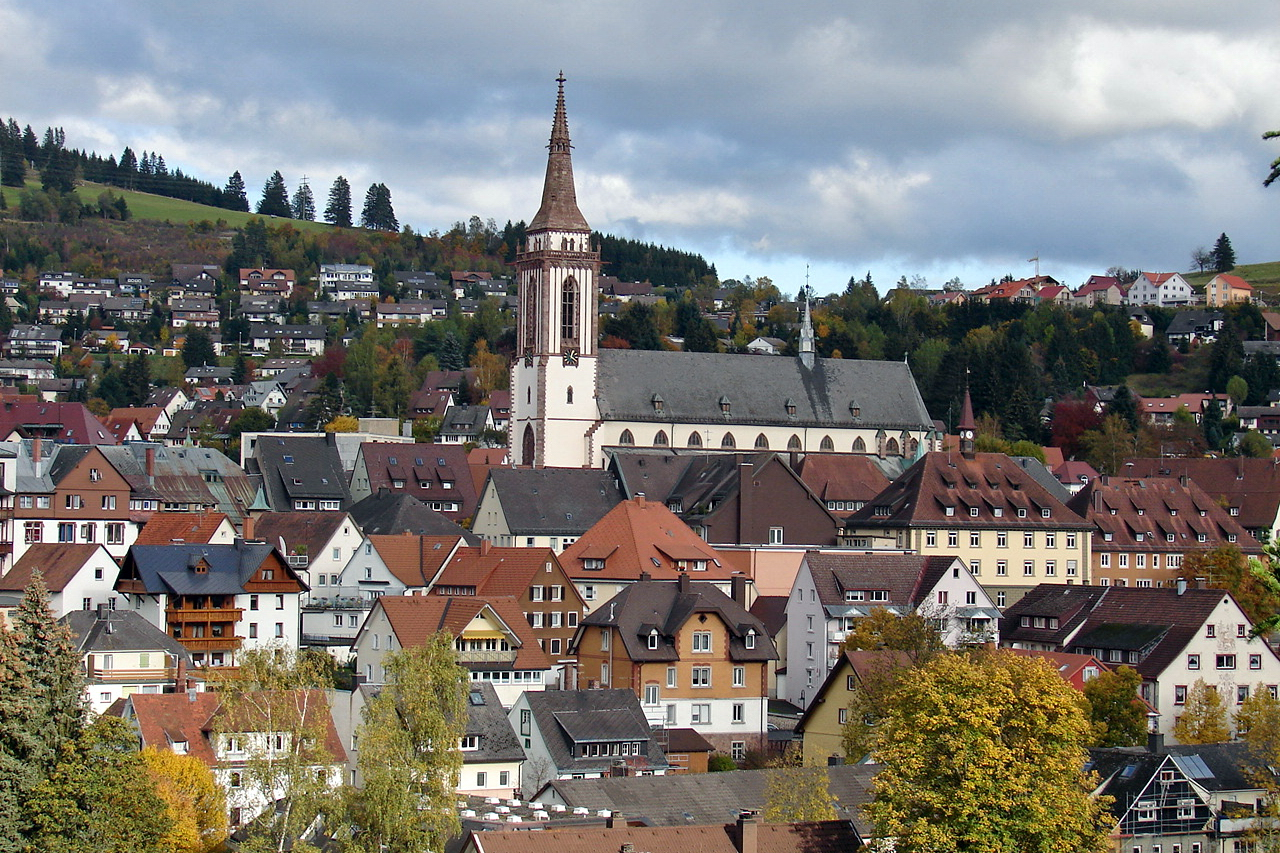
Neustadt city center

The Stadtteil of Titisee lies on the north shore of Titisee, a lake in the eastern Feldberg in the Black Forest, which ranges from 780 to 1192m above sea level. The Stadtteil of Neustadt is found 5 km to the east. The town lies on a small river called the Seebach (Lake Brook) as it comes in from Feldberg-Bärental to feed Titisee, as the Gutach (Good Water) as it flows out of the lake, and east of Neustadt, where it merges with the Haslach to become a whitewater torrent, as the Wutach (Furious Water). After flowing out of the town, it passes through the well known Wutachschlucht (Wutach Gorge), and ends by emptying into the Rhine.

Titisee-Neustadt's highest point is the Hochfirst, a peak overlooking the lake on the municipal boundary with Lenzkirch and marked by the Hochfirst Tower. It is 1192 m high.

== History ==
Titisee-Neustadt is divided into six Stadtteile (Neustadt, Langenordnach, Rudenberg, Schwärzenbach, Titisee, Waldau) which historically have been separate, although they are now amalgamated into one municipality.

=== Neustadt ===
Neustadt was founded in 1250 by the Princes of Fürstenberg. There followed various name changes: the town was called Nova Civitas in 1275 (which has the same meaning in Latin – "New City" – as the German name Neustadt), in 1294 Neuwenstadt, in 1335 Neuwen-statt, in 1630 Neostadium and in 1650 New-Statt before it later became Neustadt. From 1669 to 1806 there was a Capuchin monastery in Neustadt. In 1817, a great deal of the town was destroyed in a great fire. In the 18th century, the clockmaking trade developed in the town to become a major part of the economy.

During World War I and shortly thereafter, a dearth of staple foods prevailed. In May 1919 the first municipal elections were held, which saw both active and passive participation by women, who now had the franchise. This led to four women finding themselves on the town council. The mayor who took office in 1923, Karl Pfister (d. 1993 in Freiburg) created and safeguarded jobs. This he managed to do through a loan of, all together, 700,000 Reichsmark, which he obtained through negotiations with major banks in the United States, Switzerland and the Netherlands. Through further job-making measures, such as public building schemes, about the time of the Great Depression, he was in a position to keep the jobless rate in Neustadt at a comparatively low 12%, whereas it was then 18% in Germany as a whole.

Later came the Nazi régime, which used Der Hochwächter and the Echo vom Hochfirst, the local newspapers, for their own ends, later shutting them both down. Despite exerting this influence, the Party's share of the vote in Neustadt was always lower than in Titisee, where it compared with the national average. Nevertheless, the NSDAP local moved into the town hall in 1933, occupied its balcony and made an example of a few people in public life by removing them from office or sending them to the local concentration camp near Hüfingen. Blasius Müßle, who became mayor at that time, was replaced in 1935 by the later Kreisleiter (District Leader) Benedikt Kuner.

Langenordnach was first mentioned in a document dating back to 1112. In 1529, 16 houses were named; the place did not yet have a chapel.

In 1316 Rudenberg had its first documentary mention. In 1529 the place already had "several houses". In 1810, there were 191 inhabitants.

Schwärzenbach had its first documentary mention in 1316. In 1850, there were 427 inhabitants.

In 1111, Titisee had its first documentary mention. In 1635 the names Dettesee and Titinsee first appear in documents. As of 1750 the name Titisee was commonly applied to the town. The town was put together from four parts, or valleys: Altenweg, Spriegelsbach, Schildwende and Jostal. For this reason, the town bore the name Vierthäler or Viertäler ("Four Valleys") until 1929.

Waldau was first named in 1111 and the first documentary mention followed in 1178 in a papal document. Since 1807, there has been a Catholic parish.

=== Common history ===
Titisee-Neustadt came into being in 1971 with the amalgamation of the until then independent district capital of Neustadt with the Stadtteile of Titisee and Rudenberg. In 1973 and 1974, the Stadtteile of Langenordnach, Schwärzenbach und Waldau were added to the amalgamation.

== Culture and sightseeing ==
Titisee-Neustadt lies on the German Clock Road, a 320 km long holiday route that runs from the Central Black Forest through the Southern Black Forest to the Baar region.

=== Museums ===
- The Municipal Homeland Rooms (Städtische Heimatstuben)

=== Buildings ===
- The Catholic Minster in Neustadt
- The Hochfirstschanze ski jump (Germany's biggest natural ski jump, also one of the world's biggest).
- The Hochfirstturm (tower) at the top of the Hochfirst (1192 m above sea level)

=== Natural monuments ===
- The Titisee (Lake Titi) is a lake that was formed during the last ice age. Today, the lake is used for recreational activities like swimming, windsurfing and driving pedaloes. At the north-shore of the lake, there are various spa hotels offering health-related services like Kneipp cure, mudpack applications, massages and physiotherapy.
- Titisee-Neustadt lies in the Naturpark Südschwarzwald (Southern Black Forest Nature Park). The Mittelweg hiking trail that goes through town leads by many natural monuments.

== Sports and leisure ==
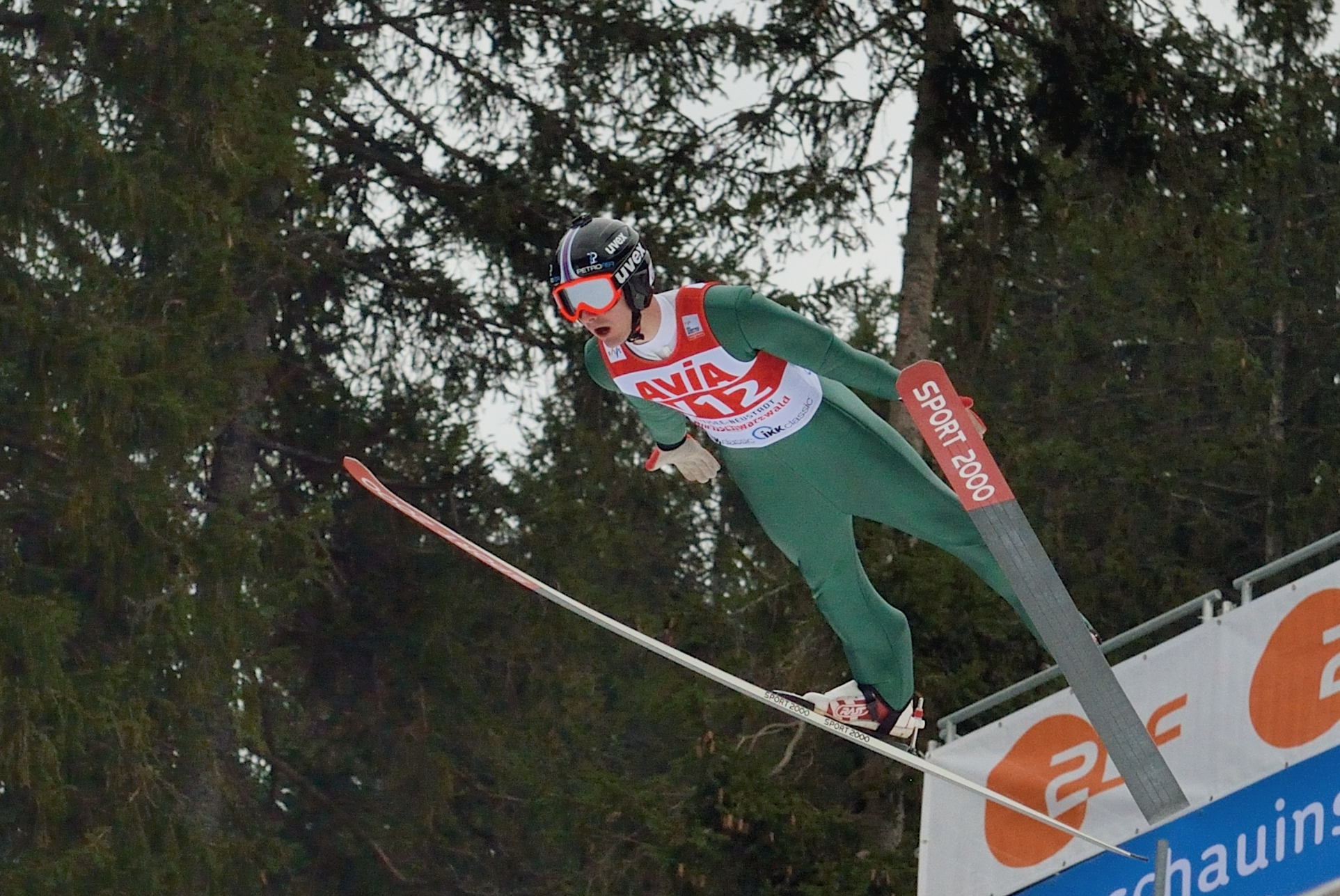
FIS Ski Jump Worldcup 2016

The Hochfirst ski jump is Germany's largest natural ski jump that is regularly host to ski jump events like the FIS Ski Jumping World Cup. The Hochfirst jump was built in 1950.

Due to COVID-19, the 2020–21 FIS Ski Jump World Cup in Titisee-Neustadt will take place without visitors.

There are numerous hiking trails around the municipality suitable for short walks or all-day hikes. Both north-south and east–west long-distance footpaths across the Black Forest pass through Titisee-Neustadt: of the three main north–south routes, the Westweg passes through Titisee and the Mittelweg through Neustadt, while the longest established east–west route, the Freiburg-Lake Constance Black Forest Trail, passes around the south and east shores of the lake and then climbs the Hochfirst. The European walking route E1 follows the route of the Westweg in this section.

== Politics ==
Mayors of the municipality
| Neustadt | Whole municipality |
|---|---|
| 1850–1852: Josef Sorg; 1852–1872: Johann Baptist Fürderer; 1873–1875: Karl Heinrich Ganter; 1875–1879: Johann Bauser; 1879–1883: Karl Klenker; 1883–1894: Conrad Winterhalder; 1894–1905: Anton Brugger; 1905–1914: Adolf Schork; 1914–1923: Adolf Winter; 1923–1933: Karl Pfister; 1933–1935: Blasius Müßle (NSDAP); 1935–1937: Benedikt Kuner (NSDAP); 1937–1945: Albert Hirt (NSDAP); 1945: Emil Scherer; 1945–1946: Adalbert Dengler; 1947–1950: Josef Sahner; 1951–1971: Julius Pfeffer | 1971–1979: Hans Gallinger (SPD); 1979–2003: Martin Lindler (CDU); 2003-2019: Armin Hinterseh (CDU); 2019-2023: Meike Folkerts (CDU); since 2023: Gerrit Reeker |

=== Municipal council ===
The municipal elections on 26 May 2019 produced the following division of seats:

| CDU | 28.2% | 8 seats | –3 |
| SPD | 15.0% | 4 seats | -2 |
| Greens | 25.2% | 7 seats | +2 |
| Citizens' List | 11.9% | 4 seats | -1 |
| List of Committed Citizens | 19.7% | 6 seats | +6 |

=== International relations ===
Titisee-Neustadt is twinned with:

- Coulommiers (France) - since 1971
- Leighton–Linslade (United Kingdom) - since 1991

== Economy and infrastructure ==
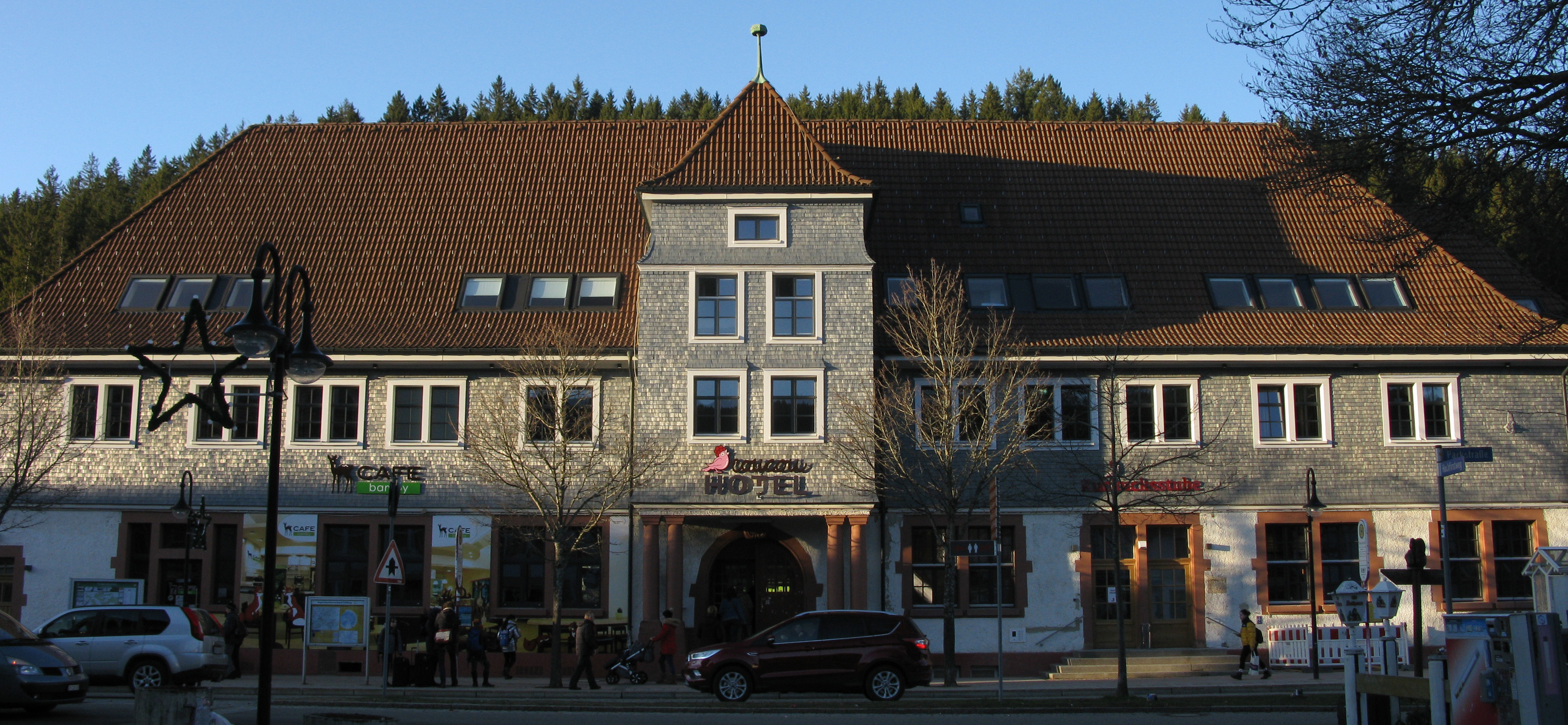
Titisee station with hotel

=== Transport ===
==== Roads ====
Titisee-Neustadt lies on Bundesstraße (Federal Highway) B 31 (Breisach - Lindau) which joins both the A 5 and A 81 north-south Autobahnen. From the B 31, the B 317 to Weil am Rhein branches off in the town. The B 500 likewise runs through Titisee-Neustadt. Also, the B 315 lies nearby.

==== Public transport ====
The town has two railway stations at Titisee and Neustadt at the Höllentalbahn. The local regional train network named Breisgau S-Bahn connects Freiburg im Breisgau with Titisee and Neustadt two times an hour. Every hour the train divides in Titisee into two sections, one going to Seebrugg on the Dreiseenbahn, the other going to Villingen via Neustadt.

Buses cover areas not served by trains, for instance Titisee to Lenzkirch and Todtnau.

==== Airports ====
The nearest airports are:

- EuroAirport Basel-Mulhouse-Freiburg (90 km)
- Zurich International Airport (90 km)
- Stuttgart Airport (150 km)

=== Industry ===
Among the industrial firms established in the municipality are:

- Konrad Hog Werksvertretungen GmbH
- Bach KfZ-Landmaschinen
- Bau GmbH Schubnell KG
- H.M.V. Maschinenverleih
- Hoenes Uhrenfabrik
- NOVILA Wäschefabrik GmbH
- Felix Schoeller GmbH & Co

=== Courts ===
Titisee-Neustadt has at its disposal a Magistrates' Court (Amtsgericht) which belongs to the state court region of Freiburg im Breisgau and to the supreme state court region (Oberlandesgericht) of Karlsruhe.

== Sons and daughters of the town ==
- Emil Ketterer (1883–1959), athlete, physician and politician (NSDAP)
- Stefan Meier (1889–1944), politician (SPD), and Nazi-victim
- Franz Beckert (1907–1973), Olympic champion in the team stage in 1936 in Berlin
- Egon Hirt (born 1960), ski racer
- Michael Möllinger (born 1980), ski jumper
- Adelheid Morath (born 1984), cyclist in cross-country mountain biking
- Alexander Weiß (born 1987), ice hockey player
- Andreas Glockner (born 1988), soccer player
- Melanie Faißt (born 1990), ski jumping champion
- Daniel Weiß (born 1990), ice hockey player
- Benedikt Doll (born 1990), biathlete
- Ramona Straub (born 1992), ski jumping champion

=== Honorary citizens ===
- Medical adviser Dr. Josef Winterhalter (b. 1796 in St. Märgen; d. 1879 in Neustadt), founder of Neustadt's first hospital.

== 2012 workshop fire ==
On 26 November 2012, 14 people were killed and 8 injured in a major fire at a workshop for disabled people in Titisee-Neustadt. The blaze occurred at the centre run by the Caritas charity. About 50 people were believed to be in the building when the fire started. The cause is unclear, but local media reports that there may have been an explosion in a store room. The centre is reportedly used for woodwork and metalwork, but it is not known whether there were any flammable materials on site.

== Photo gallery ==
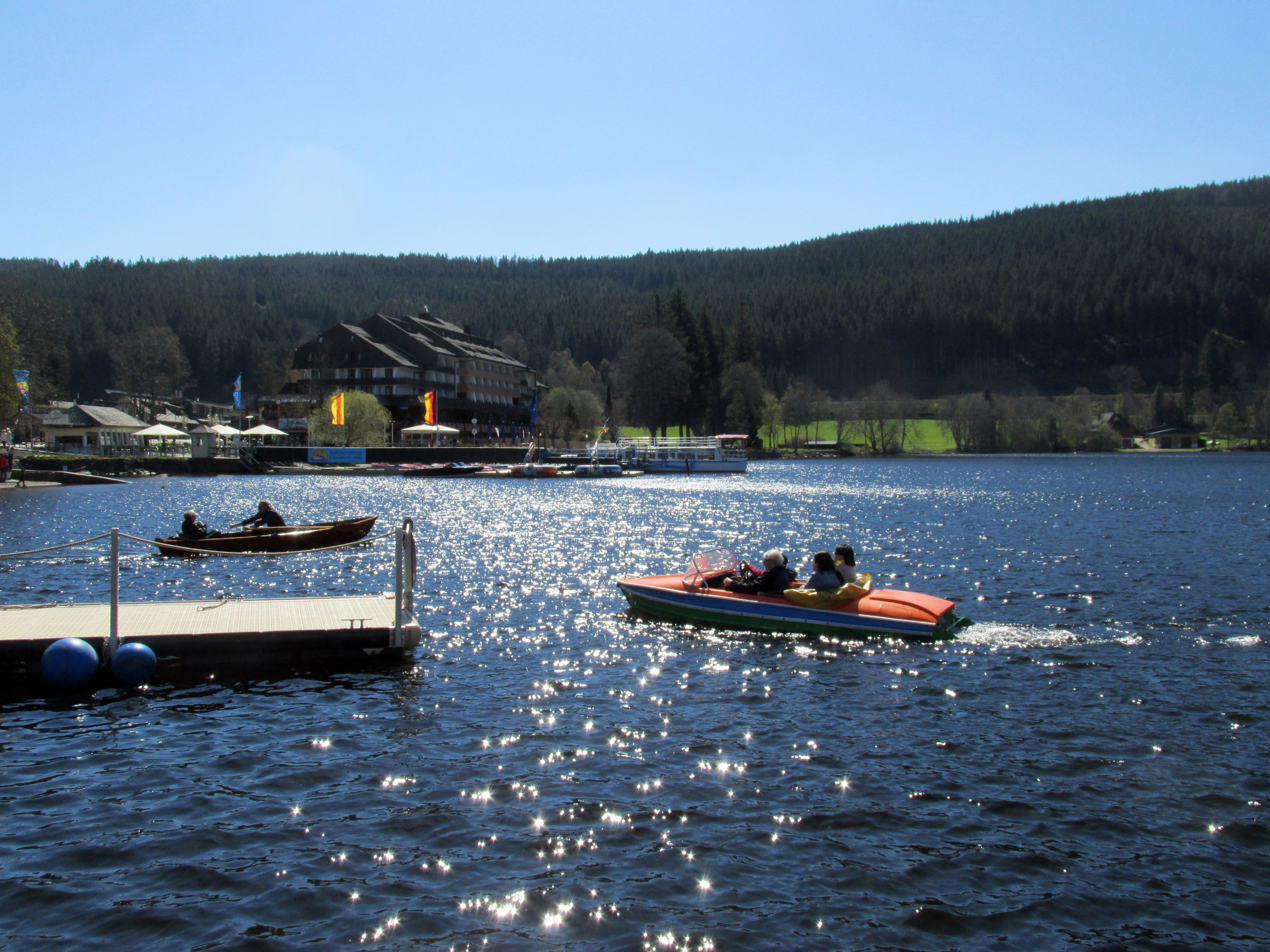
The Titisee in summer

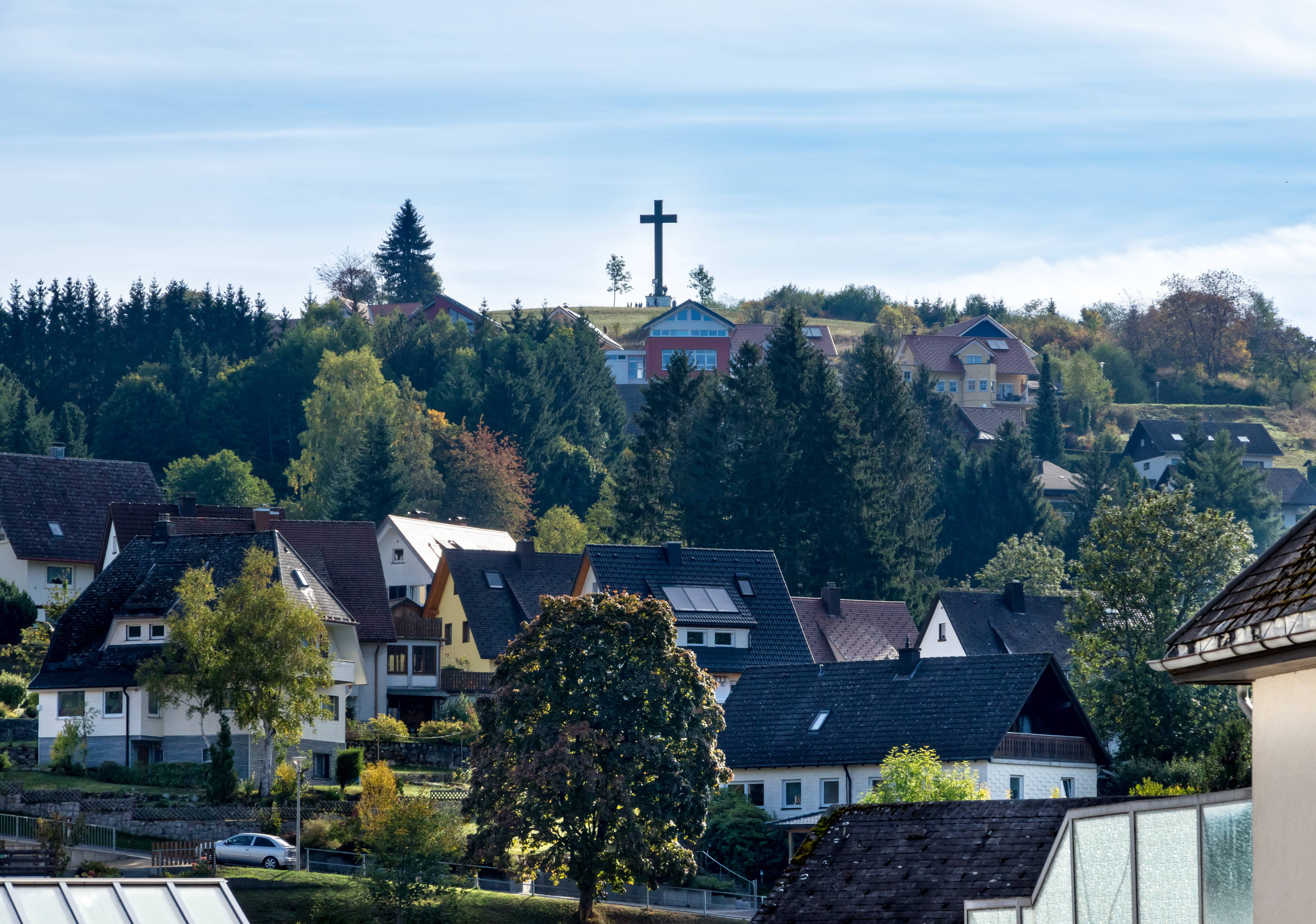
House roofs in Titisee-Neustadt

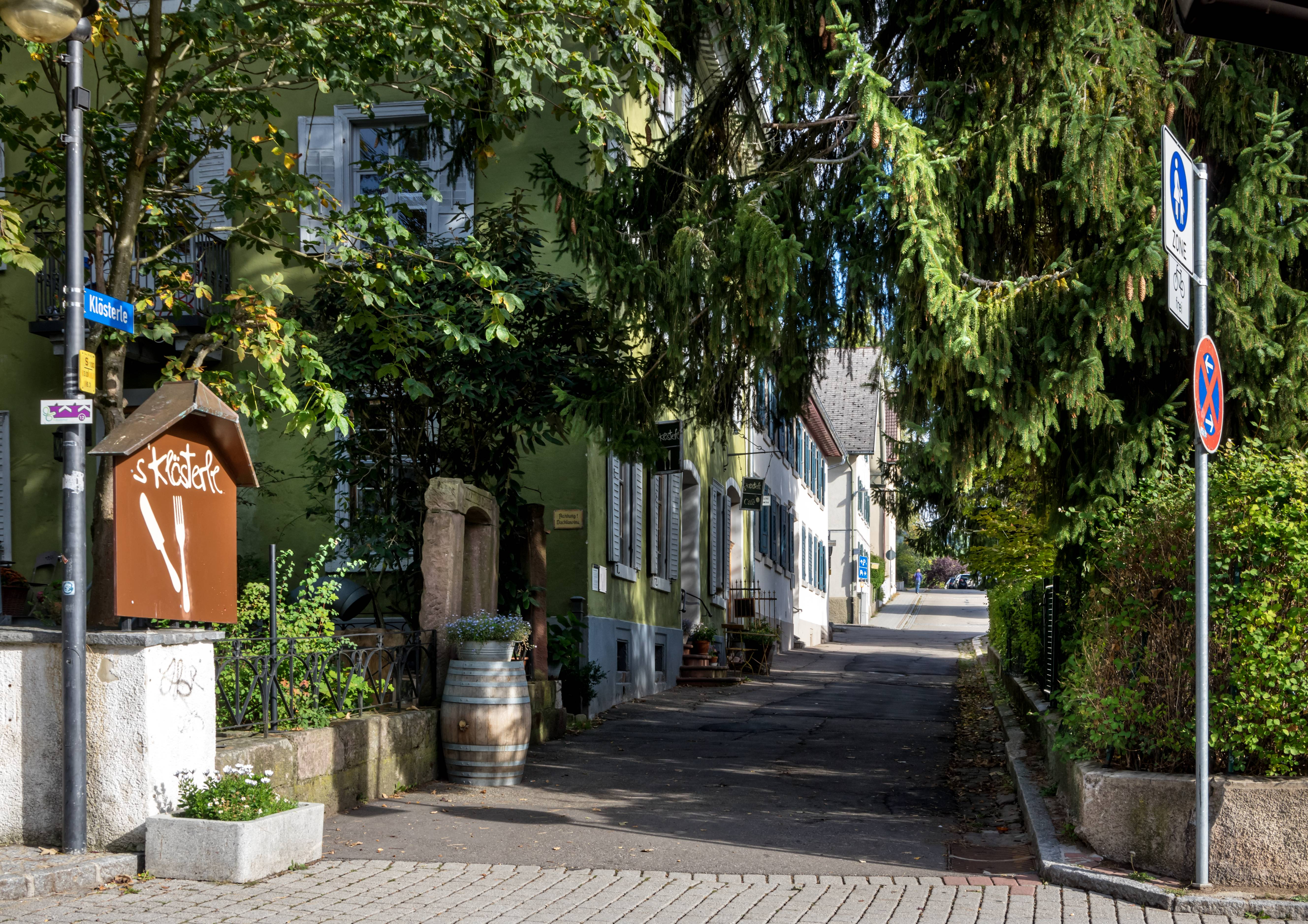
Old town Neustadt

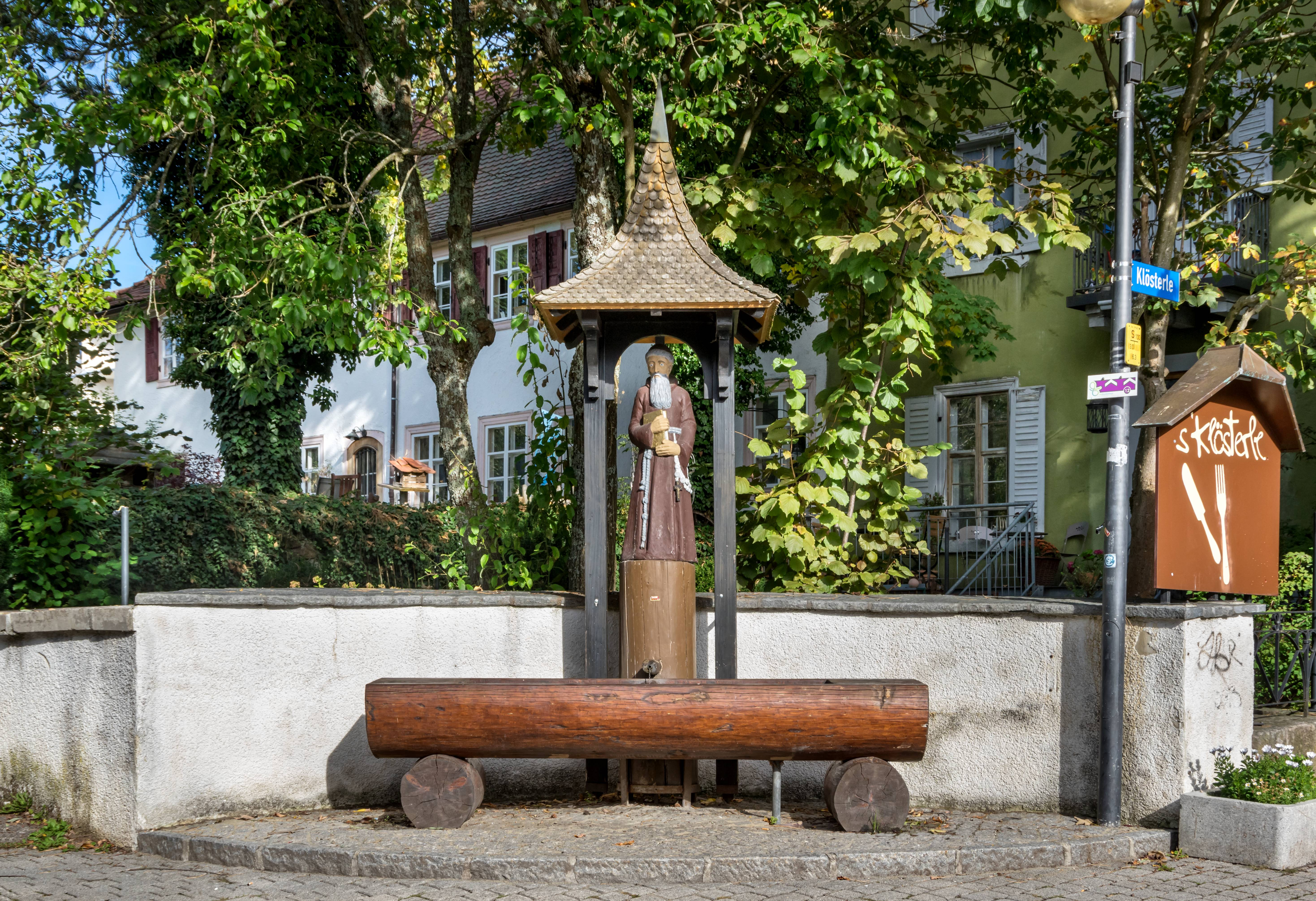
Klösterlebrunnen in Titisee-Neustadt

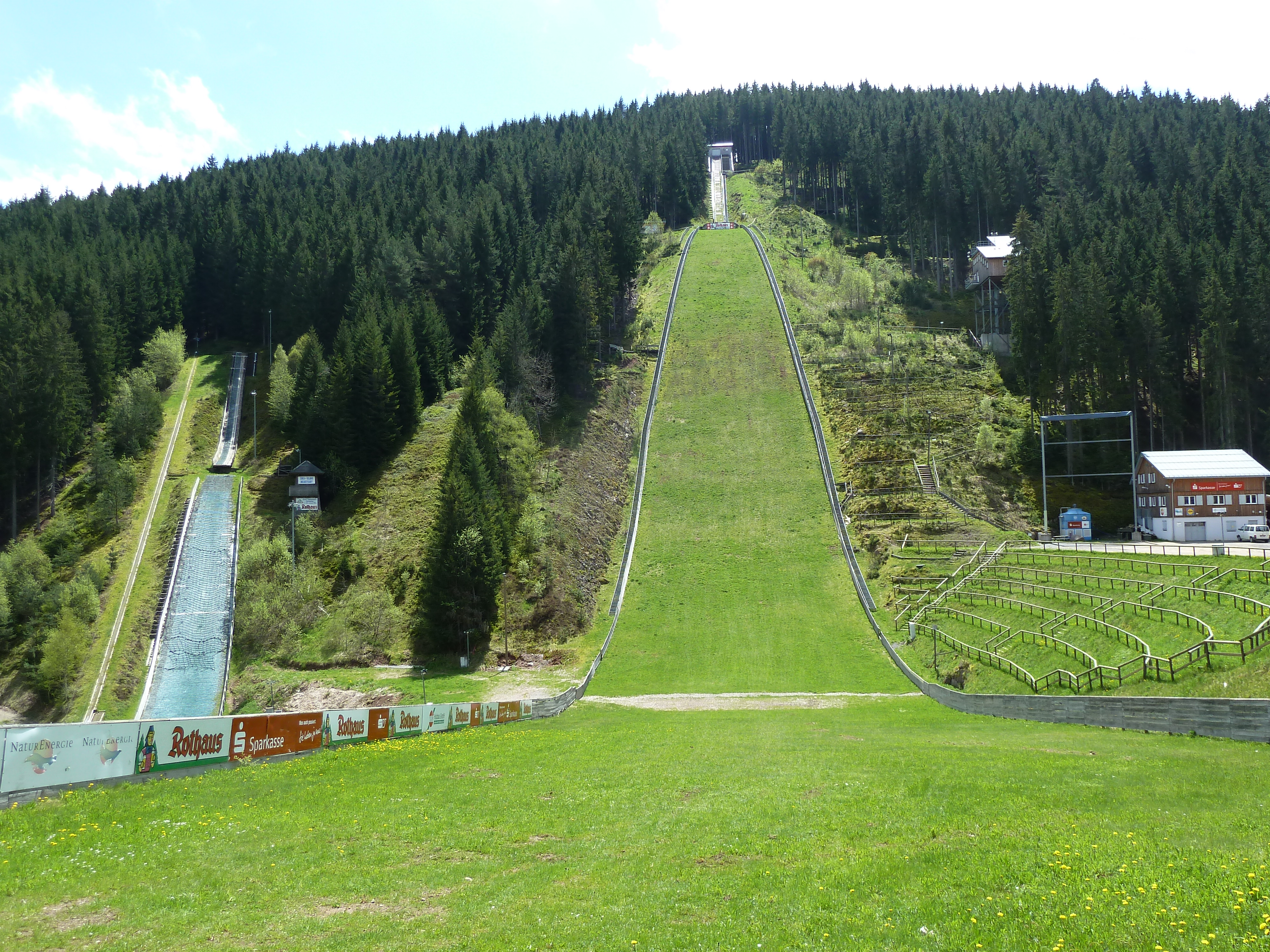
The Hochfirstschanze ski jump in summer

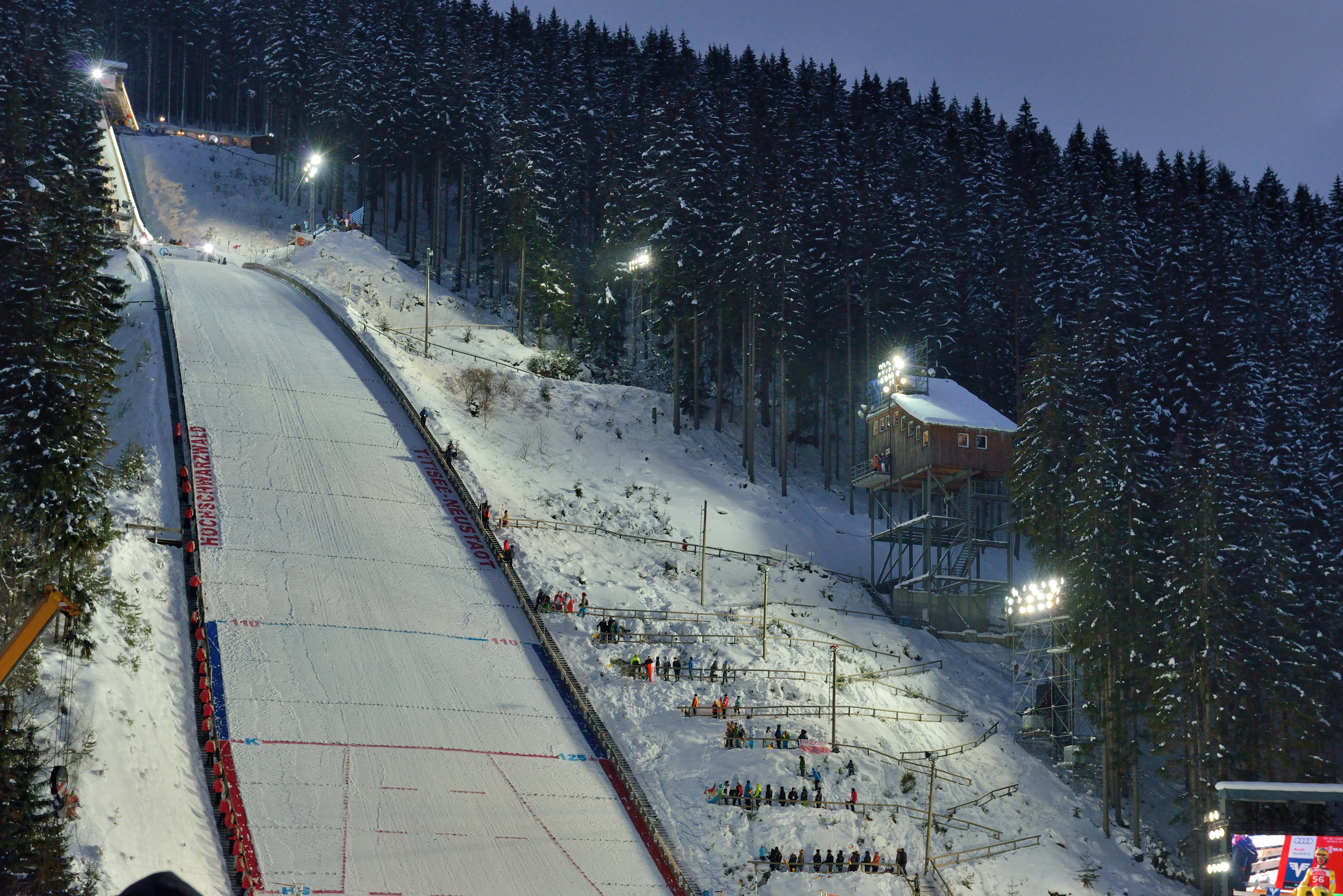
The Hochfirstschanze ski jump in winter

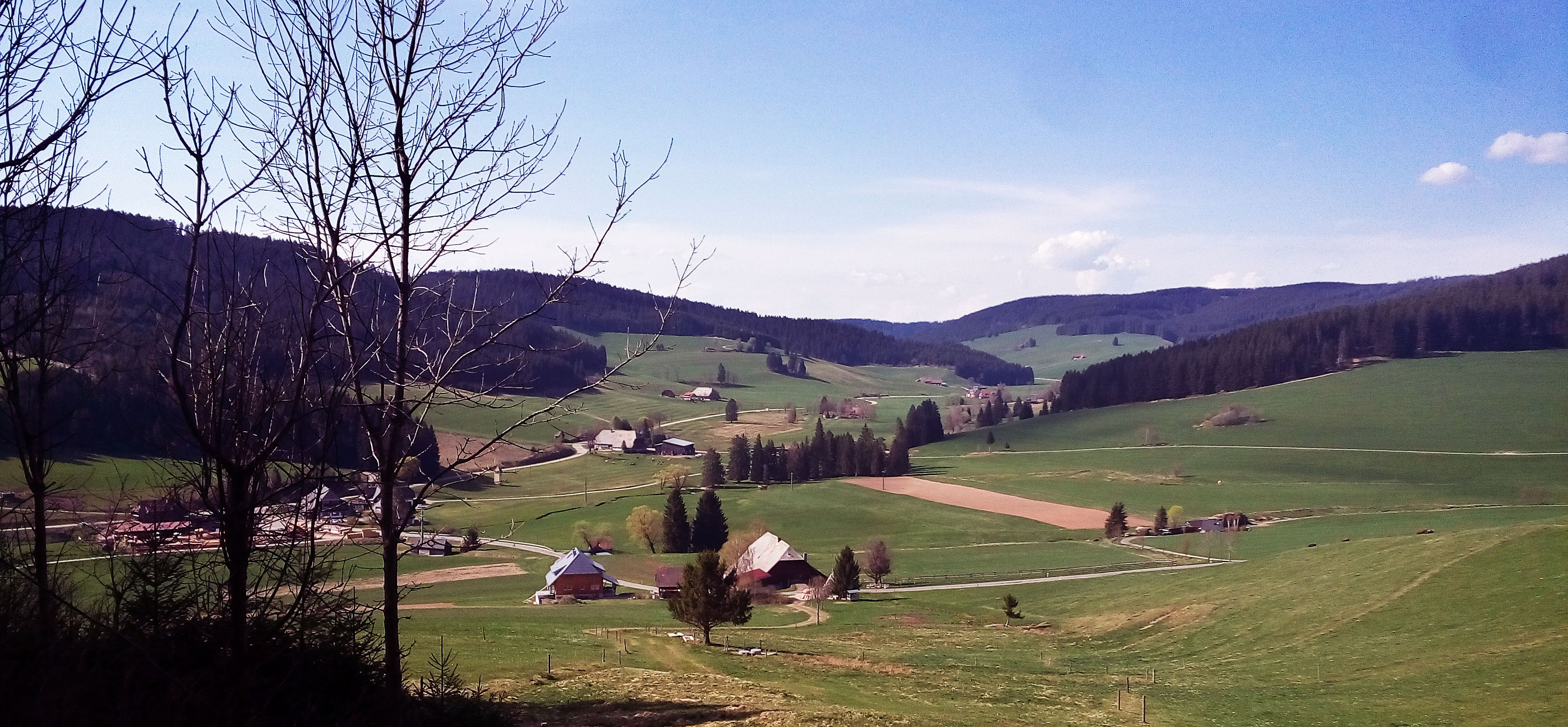
Langenordnach valley
