= Lenzkirch =

- Municipality
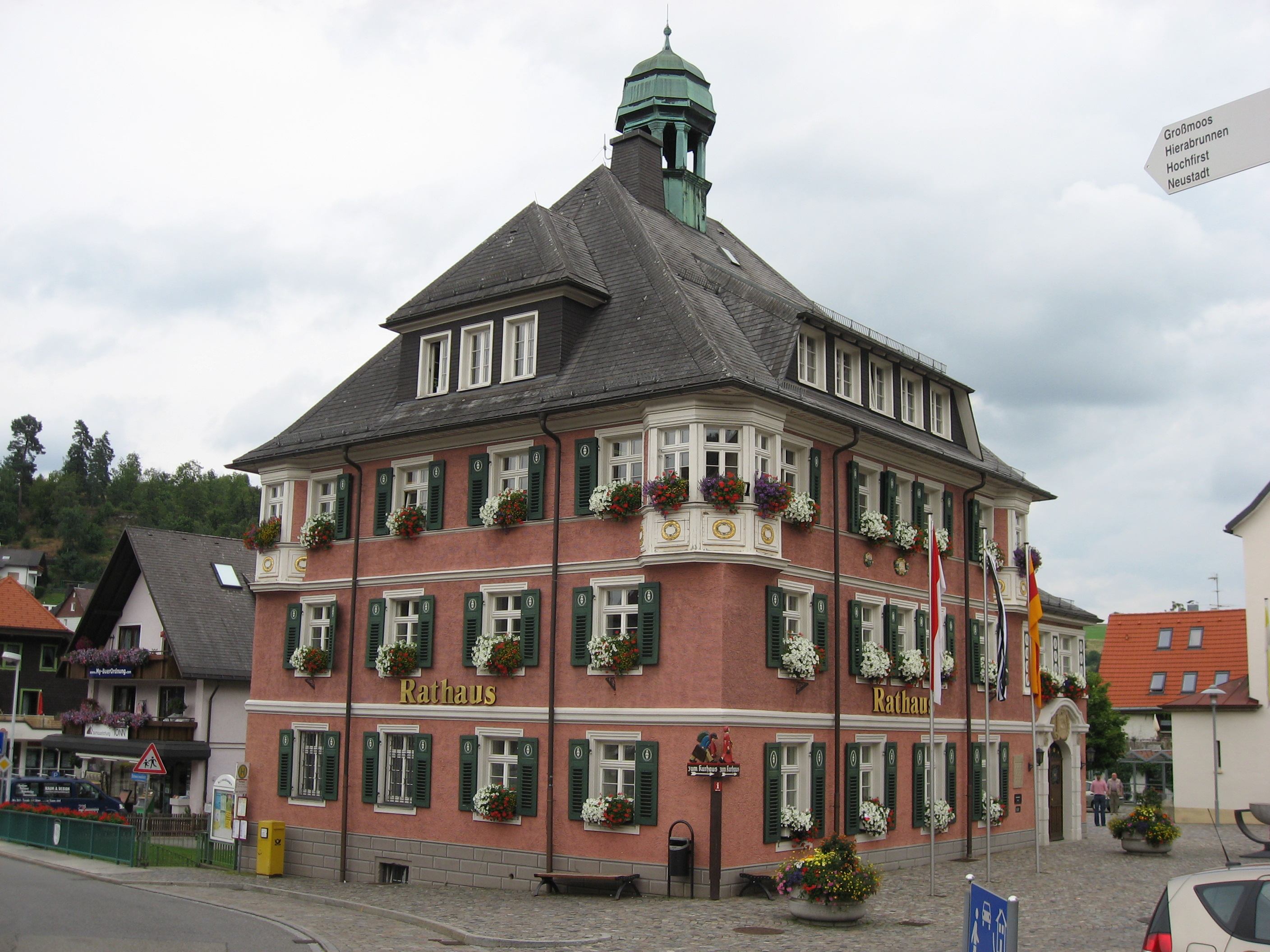
- Town hall

- Coat of arms

- Location of Lenzkirch within Breisgau-Hochschwarzwald district
- Interactive map of Lenzkirch
- Location within Germany Location within Baden-Württemberg
- Coordinates: 47°52′5″N 8°12′18″E
- Country: Germany
- State: Baden-Württemberg
- Admin. region: Freiburg
- District: Breisgau-Hochschwarzwald
- Subdivisions: 5

Government
  - Mayor (2018–26): Andreas Graf

Area
  - Total: 57.90 km^{2} (22.36 sq mi)
- Elevation: 718–1,192 m (2,356–3,911 ft)

Population (2025-12-31)
  - Total: 5,107
  - Density: 88.20/km^{2} (228.4/sq mi)
- Time zone: UTC+01:00 (CET)
  - Summer (DST): UTC+02:00 (CEST)
- Postal codes: 79853
- Dialling codes: 07653
- Vehicle registration: FR
- Website: www.lenzkirch.de

Lenzkirch is a municipality in the Black Forest. It lies in the district of Breisgau-Hochschwarzwald in Baden-Württemberg in Germany.

== Geography ==
Lenzkirch is on the Black Forest plateau, in the valley of the river Haslach, which near the south east border of the municipality merges with the Gutach to become the Wutach. The Urseetal, a glacial valley, falls from the southwest corner of the municipality. The highest point of the municipality is the 1192m Hochfirst peak, marked by the Hochfirst Tower, on the boundary with the neighbouring municipality of Titisee-Neustadt.

== Demographics ==
Population development:

| Year | Inhabitants |
|---|---|
| 1990 | 4,840 |
| 2001 | 5,237 |
| 2011 | 4,863 |
| 2021 | 5,023 |

=== Neighbouring municipalities ===
Clockwise from the north, Lenzkirch borders on Titisee-Neustadt, Friedenweiler, Löffingen, Bonndorf, Schluchsee and Feldberg. All are in the Breisgau-Hochschwarzwald district, except Bonndorf which is in Waldshut.

=== Constituent communities ===
The municipality is made up of the town of Lenzkirch (3,341 inhabitants, including about 50 in the adjacent village of Grünwald) and the villages of Saig (812 inhabitants), Kappel, (785), and Raitenbuch (152).

Saig is a health resort on the southern flank of the Hochfirst, and at about 1,000m elevation is the highest community in the municipality. It has about 1,200 beds available for tourists.

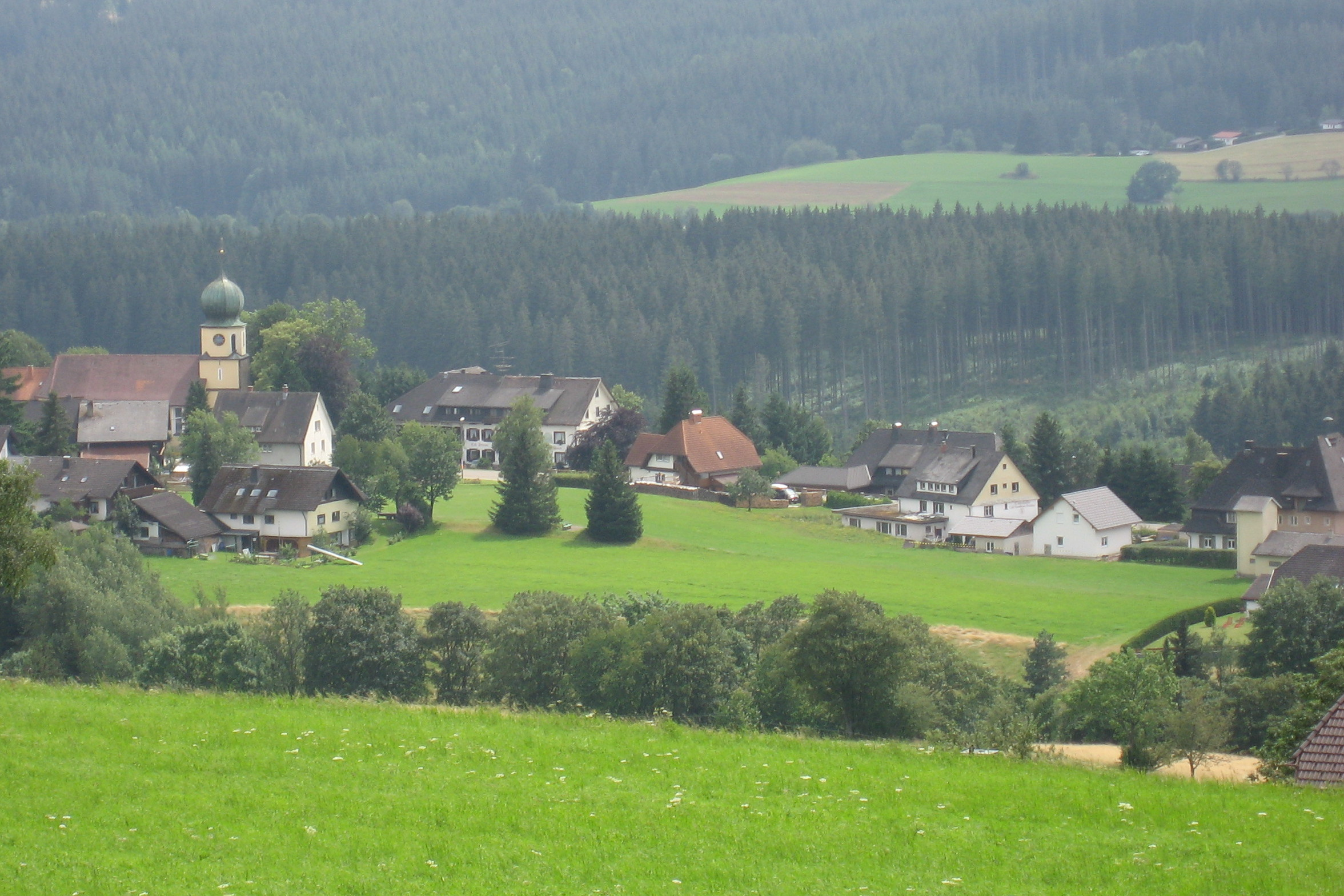
Kappel from the north

Kappel, at around 900m, is also a health resort, with about 600 beds. The Wutachschlucht begins in the outskirts of Kappel, and the Freiburg-Lake Constance Black Forest Trail runs through the village. On this path above the village to the north is a monument, the Franzoezische Kreuz commemorating the turning back of French troops by the Austrians during the Napoleonic Wars. Raitenbuch is a farming settlement to the west of the town of Lenzkirch at about 940m elevation. Grünwald, the smallest of the communities in the municipality, and is at about 1000m altitude. It is the site of a former Monastery, founded in 1350, and the tiny village church has a late-Gothic sandstone relief of the life of Christ.

=== Climate ===
Because of its high altitude, Lenzkirch has a somewhat cooler climate than most places in Baden-Württemberg. The climate is claimed to be healthy, on the grounds of clean air, high oxygen content, and plentiful wind and sun. In consequence, Lenzkirch has the official status of a "climatic health resort", meaning that visitors can be recommended by their doctors (and supported by their health insurance) to "take the cure" there.

== Politics ==
=== Mayor ===
since 2002: Reinhard Feser

=== Municipal Council ===
The local elections on 13 June 2004 resulted in a council with the following constitution:

| CDU | 44,2% | +2,3 | 9 Seats | +1 |
| FDP/FWV | 28,3% | -6,1 | 5 Seats | -2 |
| SPD | 27,4% | +7,0 | 5 Seats | +1 |
| Others | 0,0% | -3,3 | 0 Seats | ±0 |

=== Twin towns ===
- Jugon-les-Lacs in Brittany (France), since 1975

== Economy and Infrastructure ==
Since its climate gives Lenzkirch the status of a health resort, tourism plays a significant role in the local economy; as well as the long-distance route passing through Keppel, there are numerous waymarked walking and cycling trails within the municipality. Precision engineering, developed from the traditional Black Forest industry of clockmaking, is also of importance.

=== Transport ===
Lenzkirch lies on the B315 Bundesstrasse from Schaffhausen in Switzerland to Titisee; this is mainly used by summer tourist traffic. Two bus routes pass through the town: the 7257 from Neustadt via Titisee, Saig and Lenzkirch to Seebrugg on the Schluchsee, and the 7258 from Neustadt via Kappel and Lenzkirch to Bonndorf.

A railway branch line from Titisee and the Kappel-Gutachbrücke station on the Höllentalbahn to Bonndorf was built in 1907. This passed through Lenzkirch, where it made a Zig Zag to gain height in a short distance. The line was closed in 1976, and the tracks taken up. A cycle path now follows its route, providing a way of riding to Bonndorf without severe gradients.

== The carved street signs ==
Carved street signs can be found all around the city center.

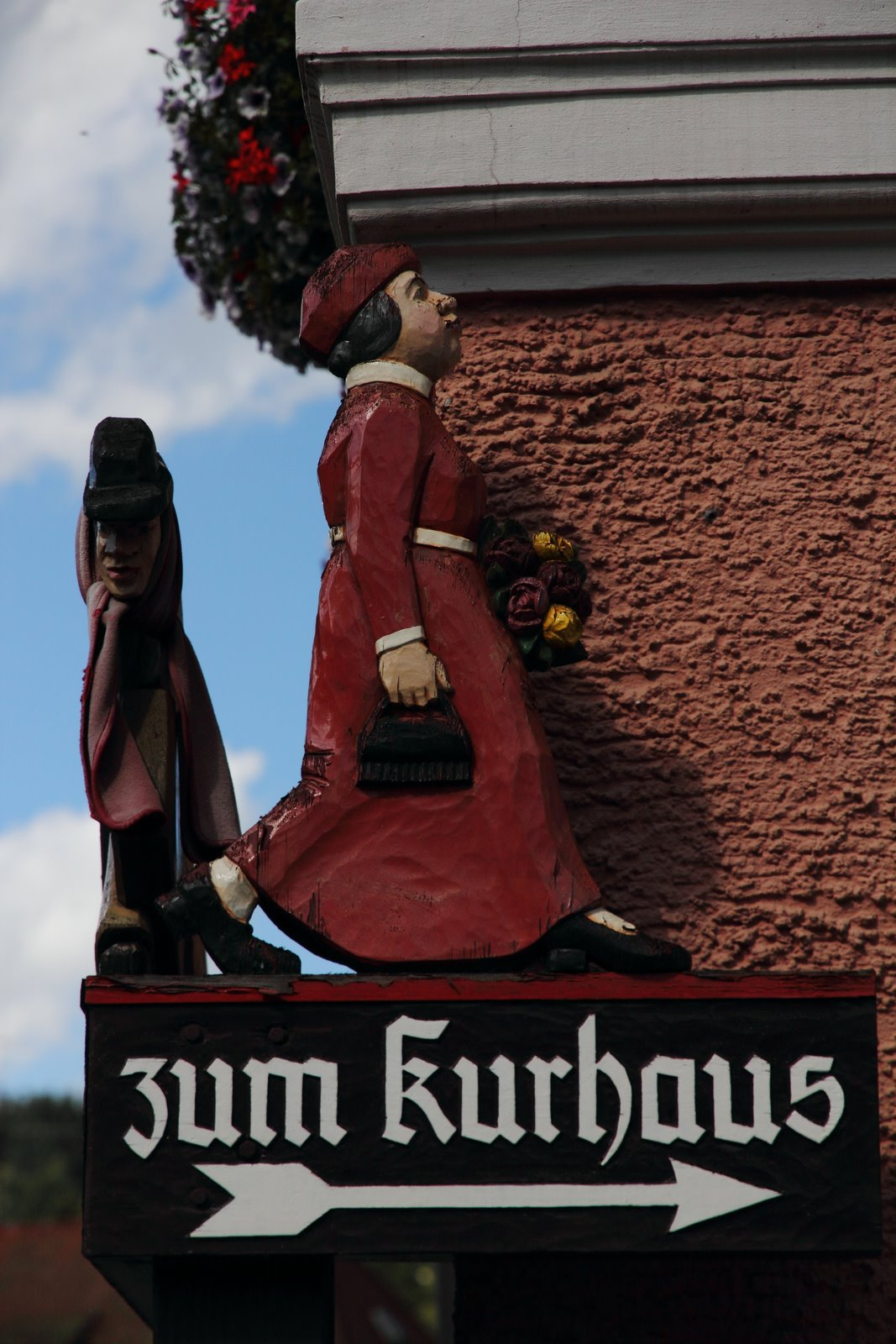

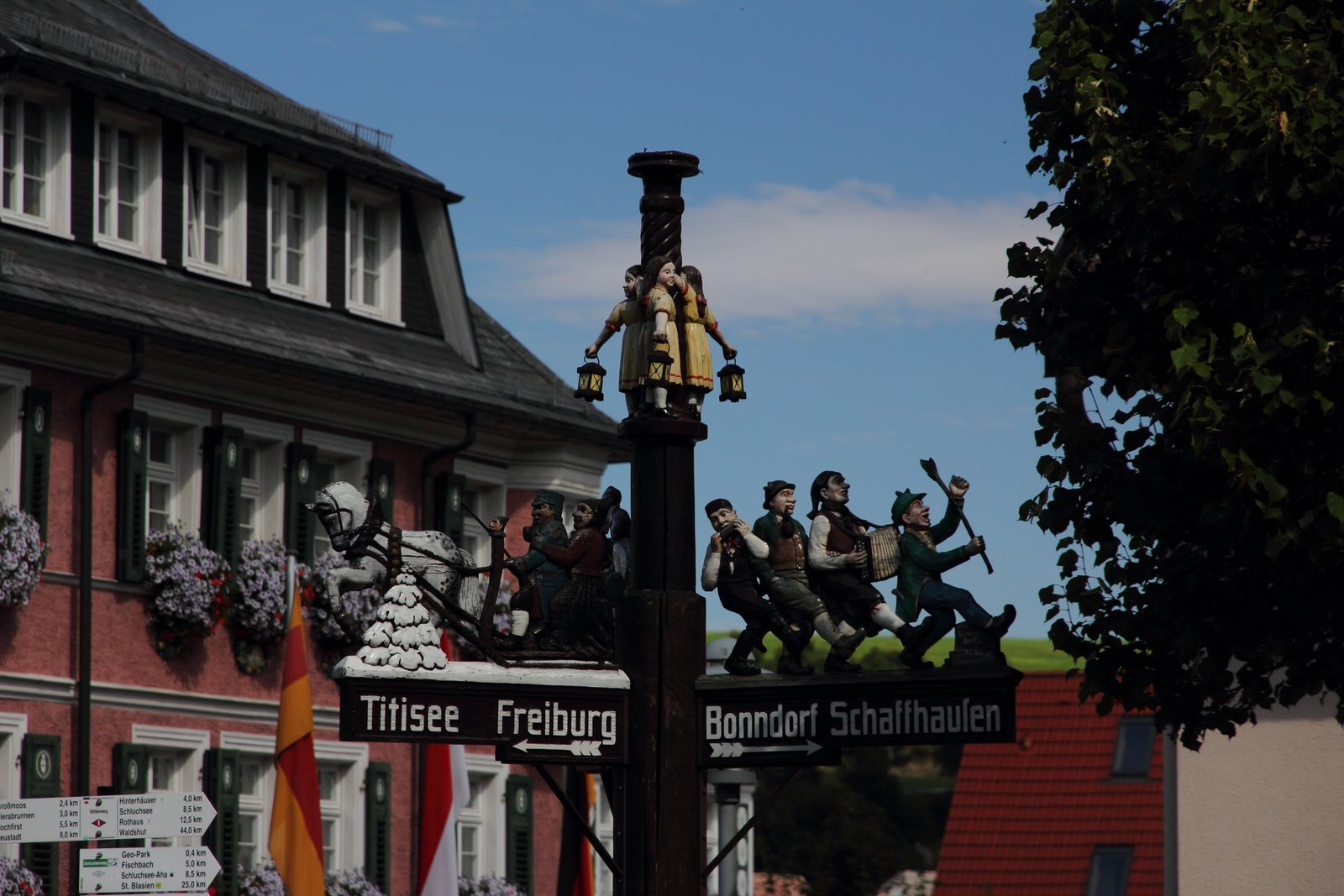

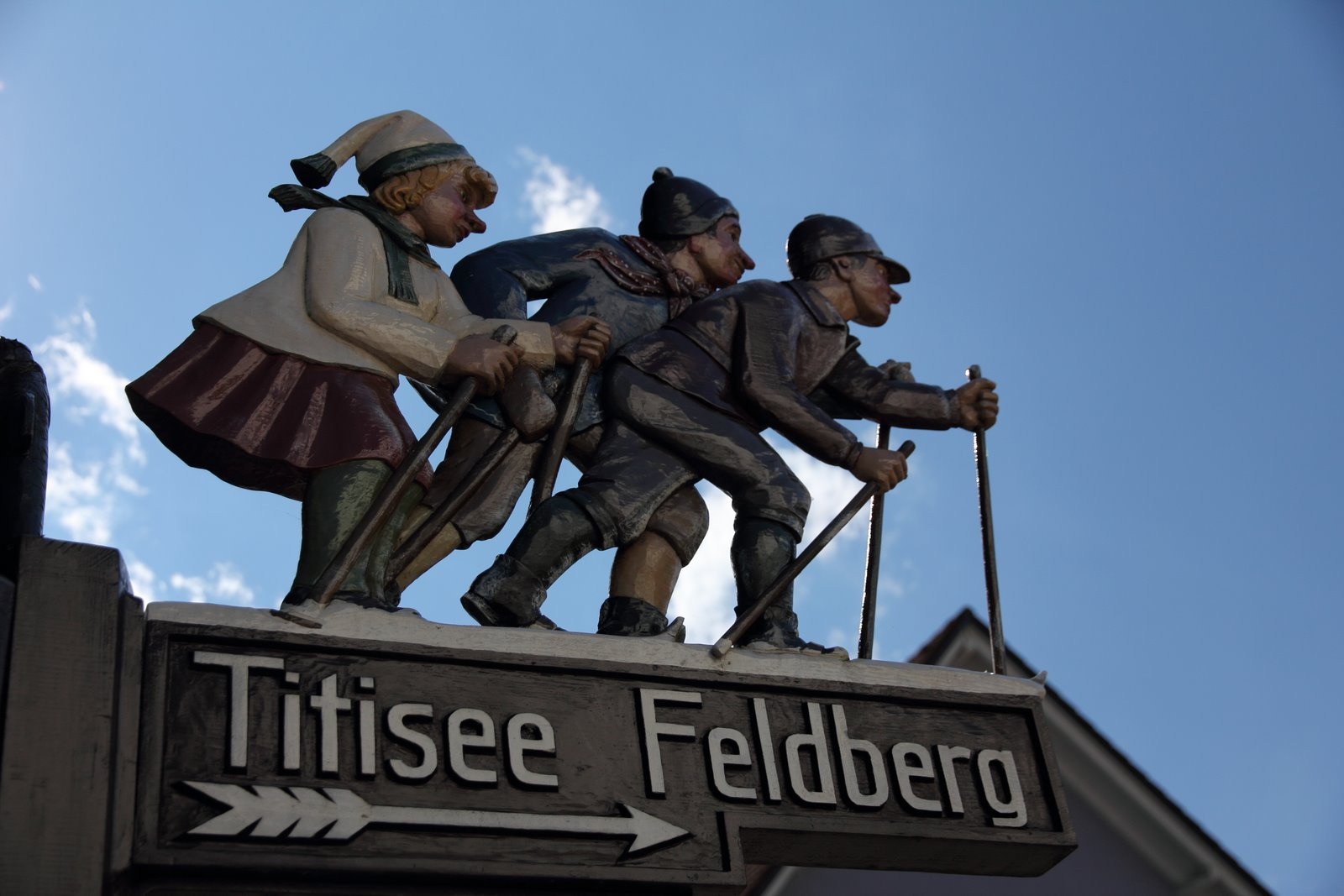

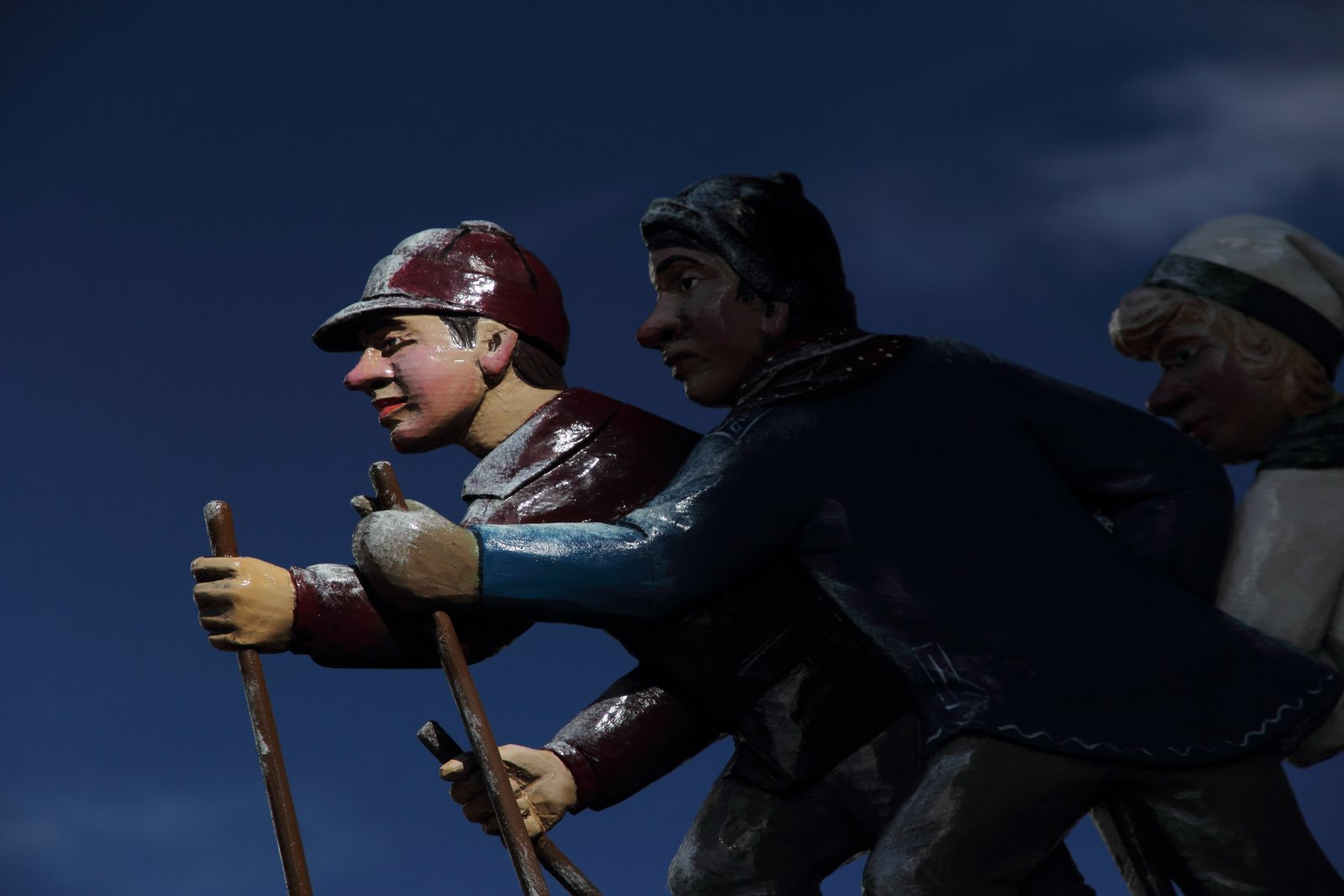

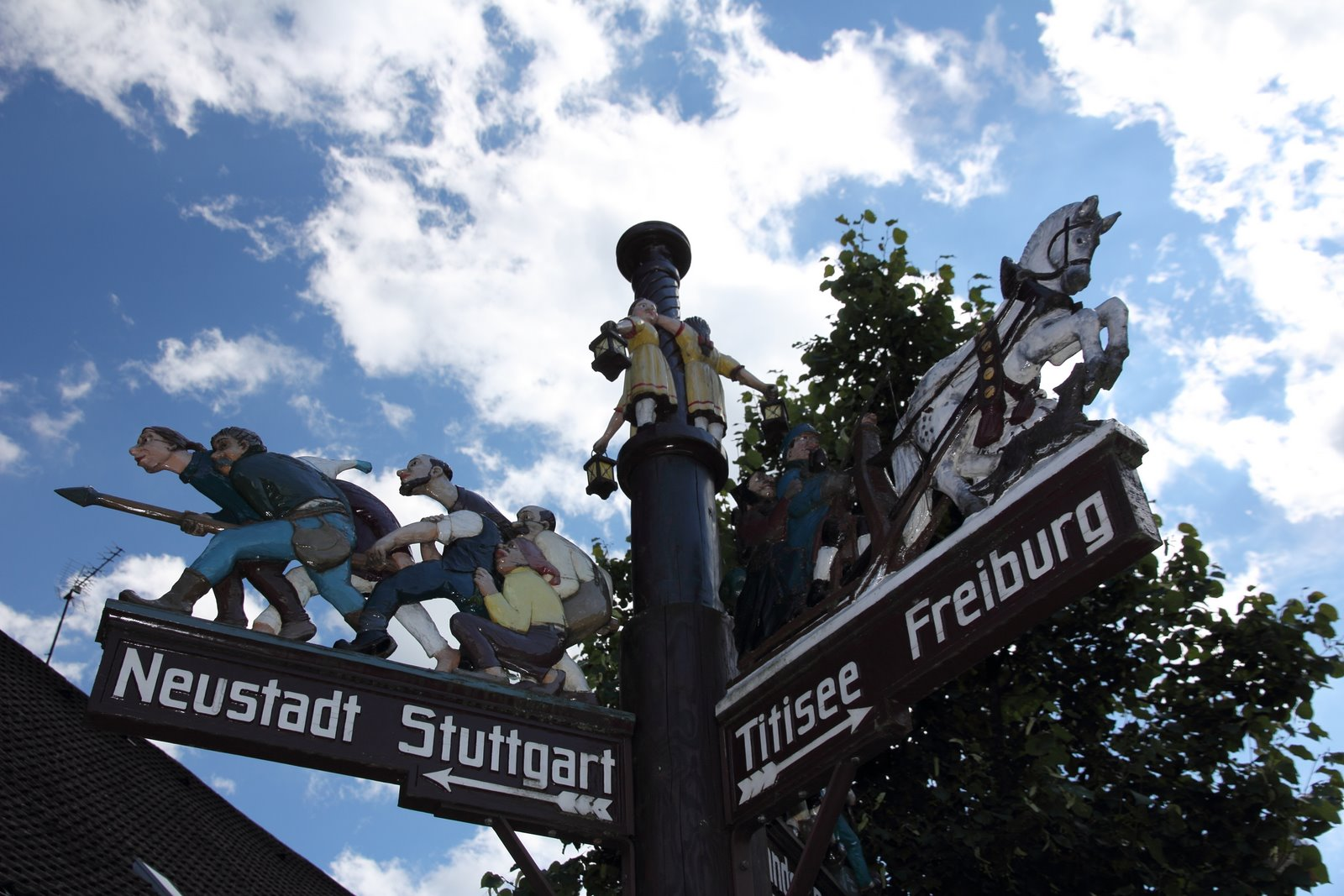
