= Freiburg–Lake Constance Black Forest Trail =

Footpath in Germany

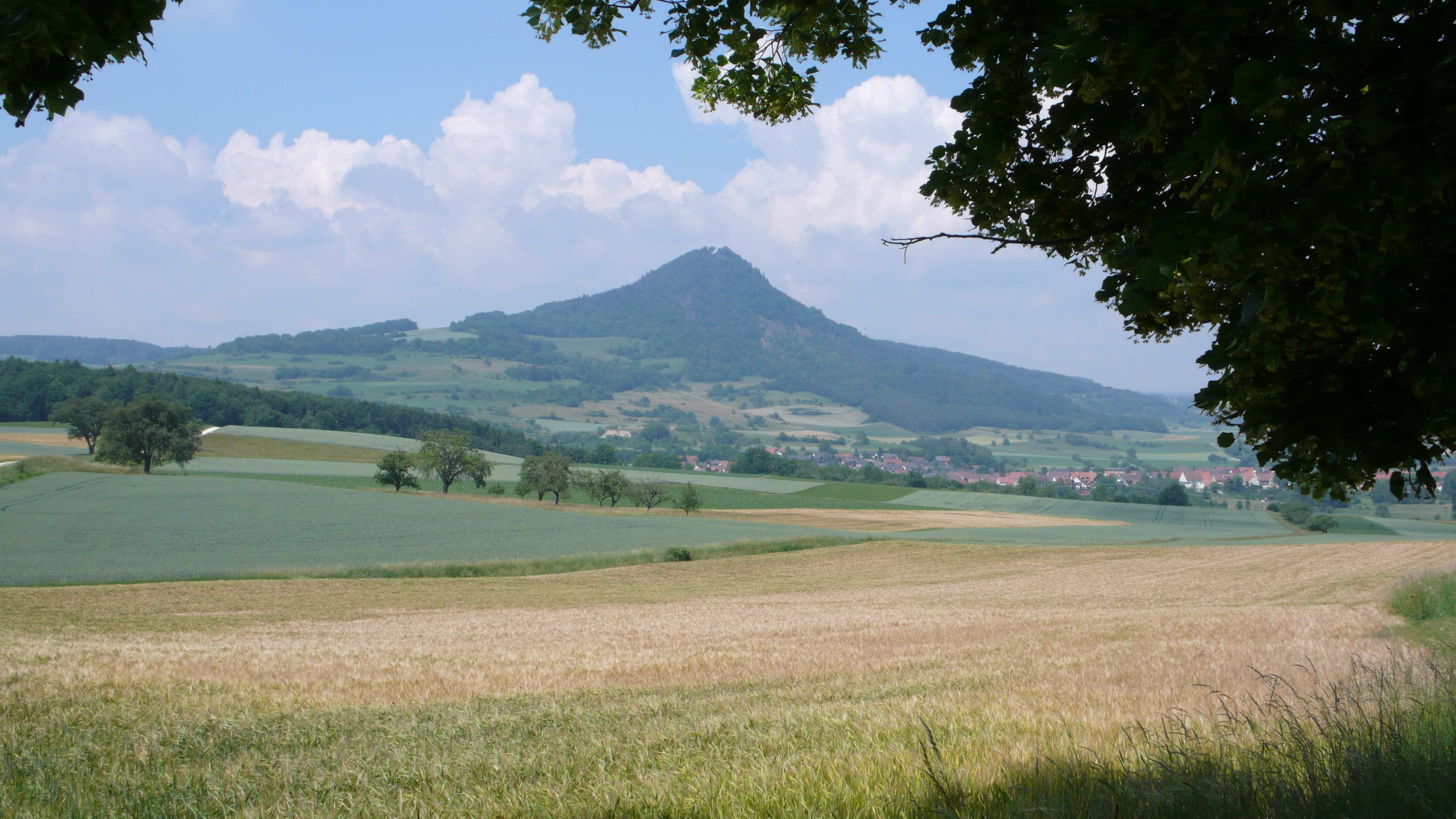
- The Hohenhewen in the Hegau
- Length: 180 km
- Location: Germany, Baden-Württemberg, Black Forest
- Trailheads: Freiburg i. Br.; Konstanz
- Use: long distance path
- Elevation change: 940 m
- Highest point: Hochfirst (1,190 m)
- Lowest point: Freiburg (250 m)
- Difficulty: easy, but in the Wutach Gorge, medium to difficult in places
- Season: spring to autumn
- Waymark: white and red diamond on a yellow background
- Sights: Hochfirst, Buchberg, Hohenhewen, Hegau Cross
- Maintained by: Black Forest Club

The Freiburg–Lake Constance Black Forest Trail (German: Schwarzwald-Querweg Freiburg-Bodensee) is a long-distance footpath that runs in an east–west direction in the Black Forest region of Baden-Württemberg, Germany.

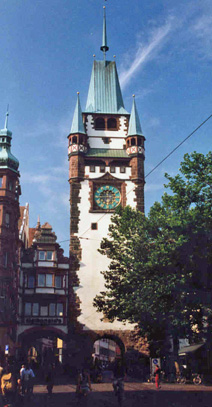
City centre in Freiburg, the western end of the trail

Its western end is the city of Freiburg, in the Rhine valley; its eastern end is the city of Konstanz, on Lake Constance (German name: Bodensee). The name Querweg means "cross route", referring to the fact that the classic long-distance routes in the Black Forest, which were developed in the early 20th century, run north–south. The Querweg (as it is briefly known) was developed in the mid-1930s. The longer name is used to distinguish this path from other east–west routes in the Black Forest.

Available guide books (e.g. Bremke, 1999) describe walking the route in the west–east direction, which leads to sharp climbs on the first one or two days and then more gradual descents for the rest of the route. From Freiburg, the route passes through Stegen, Buchenbach, Hinterzarten, Titisee-Neustadt, Kappel (part of the municipality of Lenzkirch), the Wutach Gorge, Blumberg, Engen and Singen. Its total length is approximately 180 kilometres (110 mi). Its highest point is 1,192 metres (3,911 ft), at the Hochfirst Tower, just north of the village of Saig in the Lenzkirch municipality. Because the path cuts across the Black Forest, and then continues across the volcanically formed Hegau region before skirting Lake Constance in its final section, it offers a great variety of landscape and vegetation.

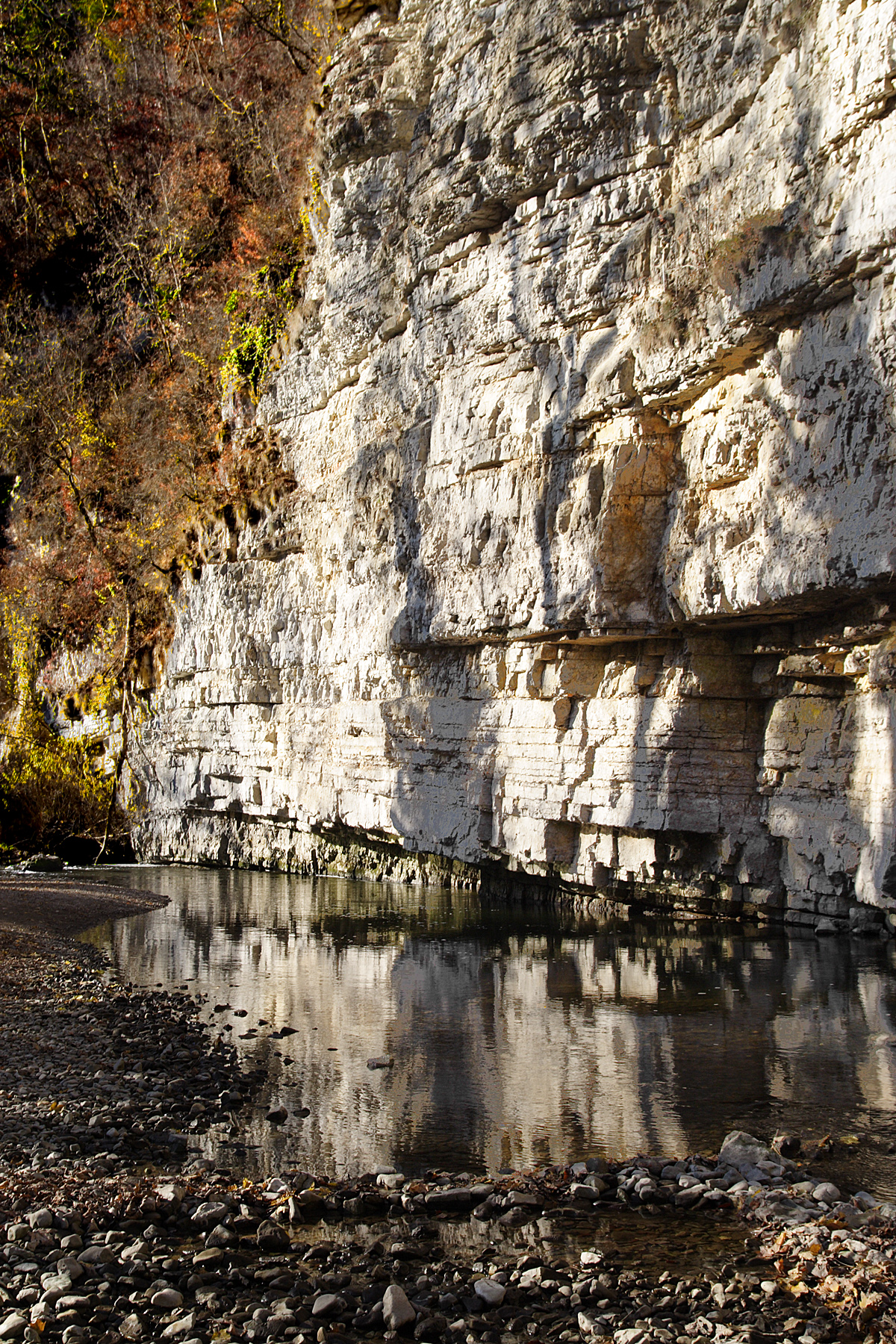
The Wutach Gorge

== Waymark ==
The route is very well marked throughout its length, using a waymark of a red and white lozenge (divided vertically, and with its longer axis horizontal) on a yellow background. According to Bremke (1999), the original planners of the route intended that the red end should always point towards Konstanz and the white towards Freiburg; this rule is generally but not universally obeyed in the waymarking in place as of 2007.

== Access and accommodation ==
The route passes through or near numerous villages or small towns, so there is no difficulty in finding overnight accommodation and meals along the route. It would require more planning to walk it while staying in youth hostel-type accommodation, or camping. The route can be accessed at numerous places along its length by road or public transport, so it is easy to walk part of it or to do day walks along its route: the section through the Wutach Gorge is particularly popular for this.

For the eastern part of its length, from the Wutach Gorge to Konstanz, the Querweg route is followed by the European walking route E1. The E1 has no separate waymarking, although occasional notices record that its route is being followed. The Querweg intersects all three of the main north–south Black Forest long-distance paths, the Westweg at Titisee, the Mittelweg at Hochfirst, and the Ostweg at Achdorf.
