= Stefan Meier =

Stefan Meier (November 6, 1889 in Neustadt in the Black Forest – 19 September 1944 in Mauthausen concentration camp) was a German politician (SPD) who was one of the MPs who voted against the adoption of the Enabling Act which formed the legal basis for the establishment of the Nazi dictatorship.

== Life and work ==
=== German Empire (1889 to 1919) ===
After attending elementary school in St. Georgen near Freiburg im Breisgau in the years 1897 to 1904, Stefan Meier was working one year as a farm worker. From July 1905 to December 1908, he took a commercial apprenticeship. In 1906, he joined the Social Democratic Party of Germany (SPD). From October 1909 to September 1910 Meier was in the military. Then he worked until the First World War in various companies as executive assistant and clerk. Meier fought in the war from August 1914 to November 1918. In July 1915, during the war he became engaged with Emma Hofheinz. The marriage produced a daughter, Margarete and a son Richard.

=== Weimar Republic (1919 to 1933) ===
The first political offices which Meier took were in local politics. From May 1919 up until October 1927, he was a city councilor in Freiburg. He also held the post of party secretary of the SPD for the district of Freiburg. In 1922, Meier was a self-employed businessperson.

In December 1924, Meier was elected to the Reichstag of the Weimar Republic. During the next four legislative sessions (December 1924-November 1932), he represented the 32nd constituency. After his temporary departure from the Reichstag in the election of November 1932, Meier returned in the election of March 1933 to the Berlin parliament, where he saw the final loss of his mandate in June of that year.

=== Nazi era (1933 to 1944) ===
In March 1933, Meier was one of 94 MPs who voted against the adoption of the Enabling Act, which formed the legal basis for the establishment of the Nazi dictatorship and was finally passed by a majority of 444 to 94 votes.

From March 1933 to March 1934, Stefan Meier was held captive in "protective custody" at the concentration camp Ankenbuck. After his release, Meier was proprietor of a tobacco shop in Freiburg. In 1939, he served as a driver for the motorized police. In October 1941, Stefan Meier, after denunciation by a neighbor, was arrested again and sentenced by a Special Court of Freiburg Regional Court for undermining military strength or "conspiracy to commit high treason" to three years in prison. Immediately after the completion of his prison term, Stefan Meier was transferred to the Mauthausen concentration camp, where he died in September 1944. The noted cause of death was "acute heart failure". Before his arrest, Stefan Meier did not have a history of heart problems.

== Honors and awards ==
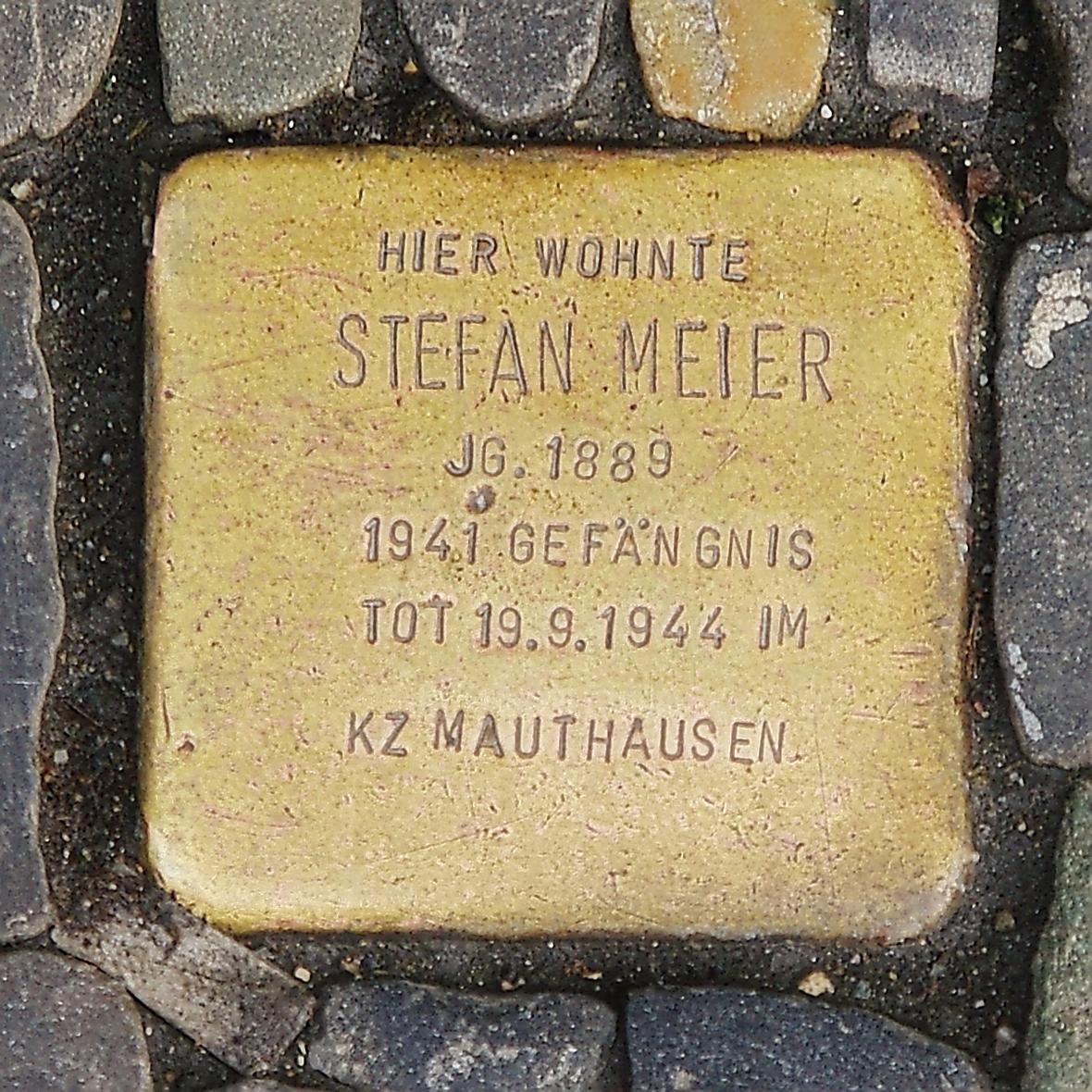
Stumbling Stone of Stefan Meier in Freiburg im Breisgau

Memorials for Stefan Meier are today found near his former home in the city Freiburg. Freiburg renamed named the Bismarck Street in honor of Stefan Meier as Stefan-Meier-Strasse (or Stefan Meier Street). In 1989, the city of Freiburg commemorated Meier's 100th Birthday with an event in the historic council chamber of the Freiburg City Hall. Since 1992, one of the ninety-six Stolpersteine (or Stumbling Stones), which are memorial stones placed in the street in front of the homes of members of parliament murdered by the Nazis, was dedicated to Meier.

== Records ==
Meier's records are currently stored in the Freiburg City Archives under the reference K1/85. They contain correspondence and personal notes, newspaper clippings about Meier, documents relating to Meier's trial, and documents relating to Meier's recognition after 1945. In addition, there are interview transcripts and notes from Meier's relatives, friends, and acquaintances about him from the period after 1945.
