= Titisee =

Lake in the southern Black Forest in Baden-Württemberg, Germany

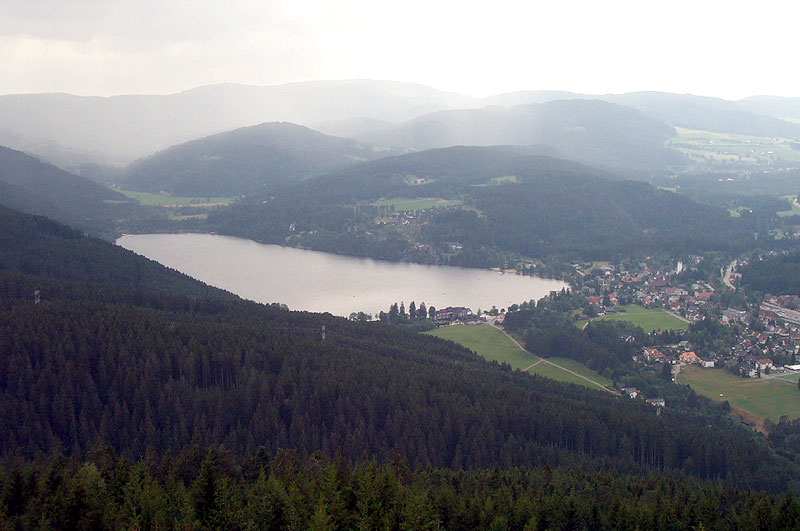
- View from the Hochfirst

- Location within Baden-Württemberg
- Location: South Black Forest
- Coordinates: 47°54′N 8°09′E
- Primary inflows: Seebach
- Primary outflows: Gutach
- Catchment area: 24.2 km^{2} (9.3 sq mi)
- Basin countries: Germany
- Max. length: 1.87 km (1.16 mi)
- Max. width: 750 m (2,460 ft)
- Surface area: 1.07 km^{2} (0.41 sq mi)
- Average depth: 20.5 m (67 ft)
- Max. depth: 39.0 m (128.0 ft)
- Water volume: 22,500,000 m^{3} (790,000,000 cu ft)
- Surface elevation: 845 m (2,772 ft)
- Settlements: Titisee-Neustadt

The Titisee (German pronunciation: [ˈtɪtizeː]) is a lake in the southern Black Forest in Baden-Württemberg. It covers an area of 1.3 km^{2} (320 acres) and is an average of 20 m (66 ft) deep. It owes its formation to the Feldberg glacier, the moraines of which were formed in the Pleistocene epoch and nowadays form the shores of the lake. The lake's outflow, at 840 m (2,760 ft) above sea level, is the River Gutach, which merges with the Haslach stream below Kappel to form the Wutach. The waters of the Titisee thus drain eventually into the Upper Rhine between Tiengen and Waldshut. On the north shore lies the spa town of the same name, today a part of the municipality of Titisee-Neustadt.

== History ==
A glacial lake is created when the glacier remains stationary for a long time and the weight of the glacier excavates the landscape. Where the glacier is less powerful, the subsoil is less excavated and rises. In addition, it is possible that a moraine (deposit of rock material that is transported with the glacier) prevents the runoff. When the ice melts, water is dammed up to the moraine and a lake is created. The Titisee owes its formation to the last ice age (Pleistocene). Up until 10,000 years ago, a glacier stretched from the Feldberg to what is now Lake Titisee. The basin carved out by the glacier and the terminal moraine form the Titisee today.

The first records of the lake date to 1050 and the abbey of Allerheiligen in Schaffhausen, where the name Titinsee is mentioned. The name Dettesee is also mentioned in a deed from the parish of Saig that dates to 1111. The name of the lake adopted its present from around 1750.

In the valleys around the Titisee (Altenweg, Spriegelsbach, Schildwende and Jostal), people usually worked in the agricultural sector, breeding cattle. Craftsmen like blacksmiths, wagon makers and shingle makers would work nearer to the lake. For a long time, there have been scattered farms around the lake. At the beginning of the 20th century, the construction of the Höllentalbahn and the onset of tourism led to a central village emerging at the lake.

In 1840, two sarcophagi made of worked tuff were found below a knoll by the outflow of the Gutach from the Titisee. In 2011, the archaeologist, Andreas Haasis-Berner, published an article stating that they had to date to the period between 700 and 900. Hitherto, it had been thought that the High Black Forest had been unsettled during the first millennium.

=== Origin of the name ===
There are various theories about the origin of the unusual name Titisee:

- In the Alemannic dialect Teti means "little child" or "baby". Tetisee or Titisee would then be a lake from which, according to local legend, small children came, similar to the story told in other places that babies are delivered by a white stork. Stories about babies coming from lakes were widespread in Central Europe (cf. Frau-Holle-Teich). Consistent with this theory, is the fact that the Titisee is a very high altitude lake and that, also according to legend, it is bottomless. Such lakes were formerly attributed with special numinous powers.
- According to another theory, the Roman general, Titus, was supposed to have camped in the area of the Titisee. The lake was said to have impressed him so much that he gave his name to it. This is also the reason why, today, a crude replica of a Roman galley plies the Titisee.
- According to a legend a nobleman called Titini hunted in the area around the lake in the 12th century.
- Also the arum lily, formerly known in the region as the Tittele, could be the origin of the name, even though it no longer occurs by the Titisee.

== Tourism ==
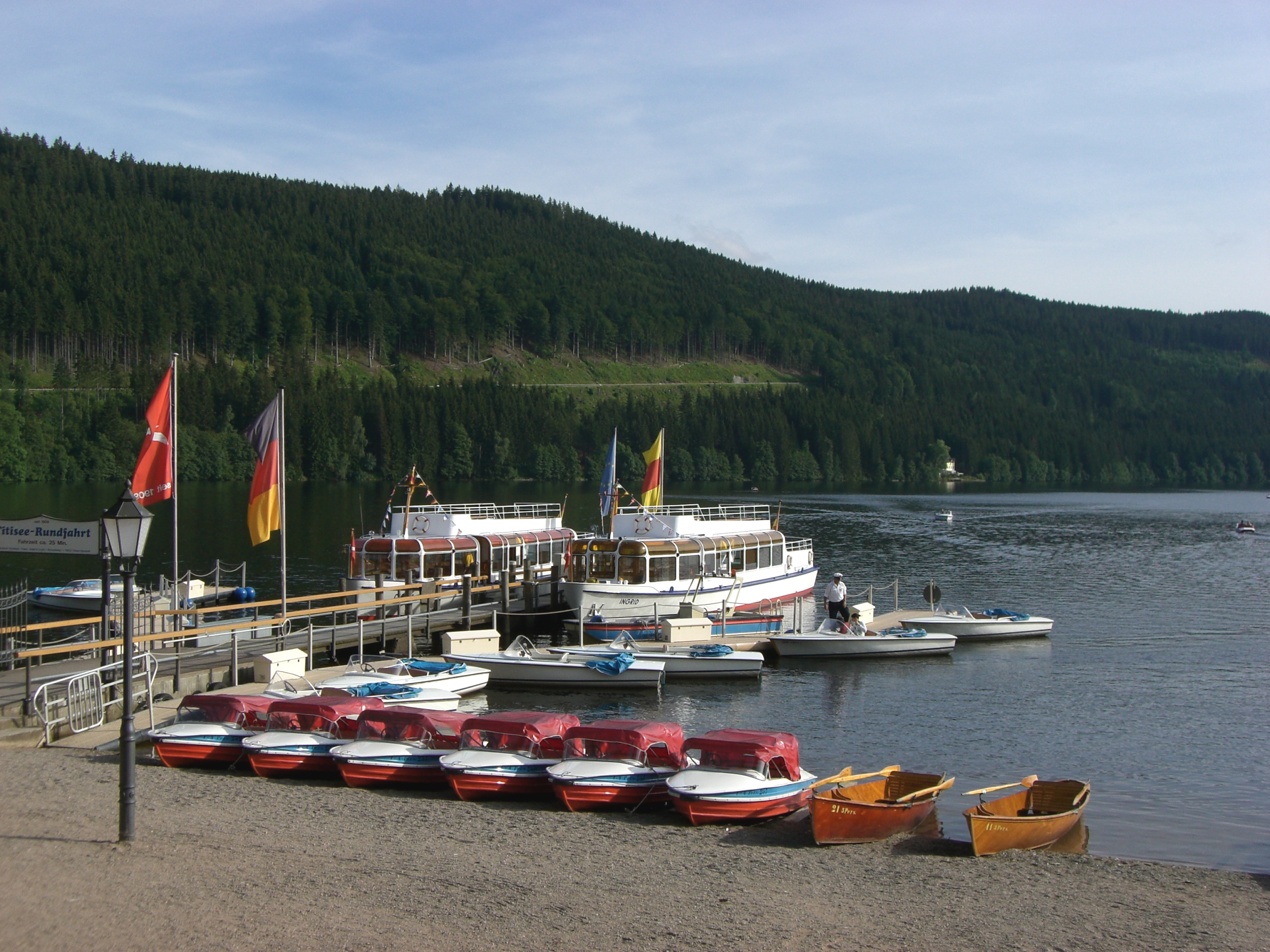
Pedaloes on the Titisee

At the north shore of the Titisee lies a popular spa town of the same name. Lots of wellness and health hotels are settled there. Spa therapy offers include Fango applications (mudpack applications with hot, odorless mineral mud), healing climate, Kneipp facilities, moor as well as breathing aerobics, movement therapy in thermal mineral water, relaxation therapy, terrain spa trails, physiotherapy, and medical and wellness massages.

In the summer, the lake invites tourists to swim, sail, windsurf, hire pedaloes, hike around the lake, and stroll along the promenade. Furthermore, plenty of open-air events are organised around the lake each summer.

In winter, the 1.2 km long Saig-Titisee toboggan is open. The largest natural ski jump in Germany, the Hochfirstschanze, is also located at the Titisee. The ski jump is host to various ski jumping events like the 2020–21 FIS Ski Jumping World Cup.

== Winter freezing ==
The Titisee takes a long time to freeze over in the winter owing to the winds, which keep the surface of the water moving almost all continuously. For the frozen lake to be opened for use, it must have a solid ice thickness of at least 16 cm (6.3 in) (solid ice or compacted ice has virtually no air pockets). When conditions appear favourable for the opening the lake, daily ice measurements are taken by the Titisee-Neustadt municipal authorities at three or four places. If opening the ice to public use is possible, and those responsible give it their blessing, specific, demarcated areas of the lake are opened, but never the whole lake.

These regulations were put in place after an accident in 1966. Up to that time, the lake had been used in winter as a landing strip for small aircraft. On 14 January 1966, a tractor with a snowplough was clearing the landing strip of snow when it broke through the ice and sank to the bottom of the lake, taking the driver, Walter Wilde (29), with it. His body was only recovered 2 weeks later.

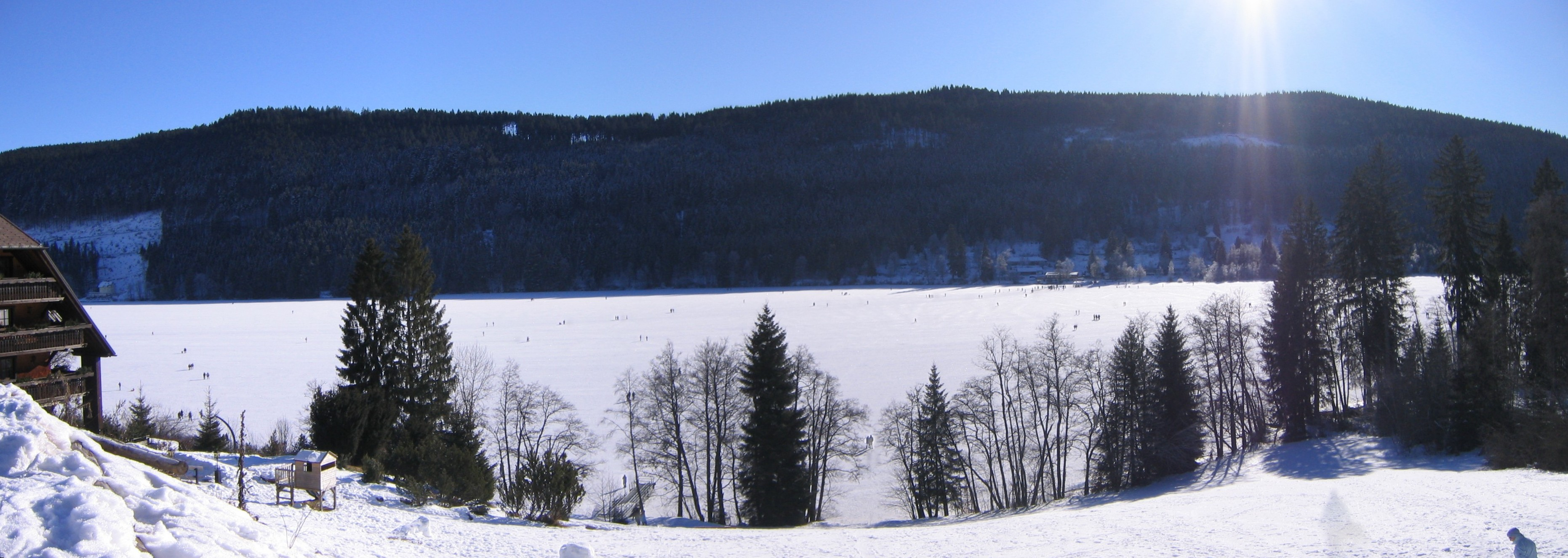
The frozen Titisee seen from Alemannenhof (2009)

== Fauna and flora ==
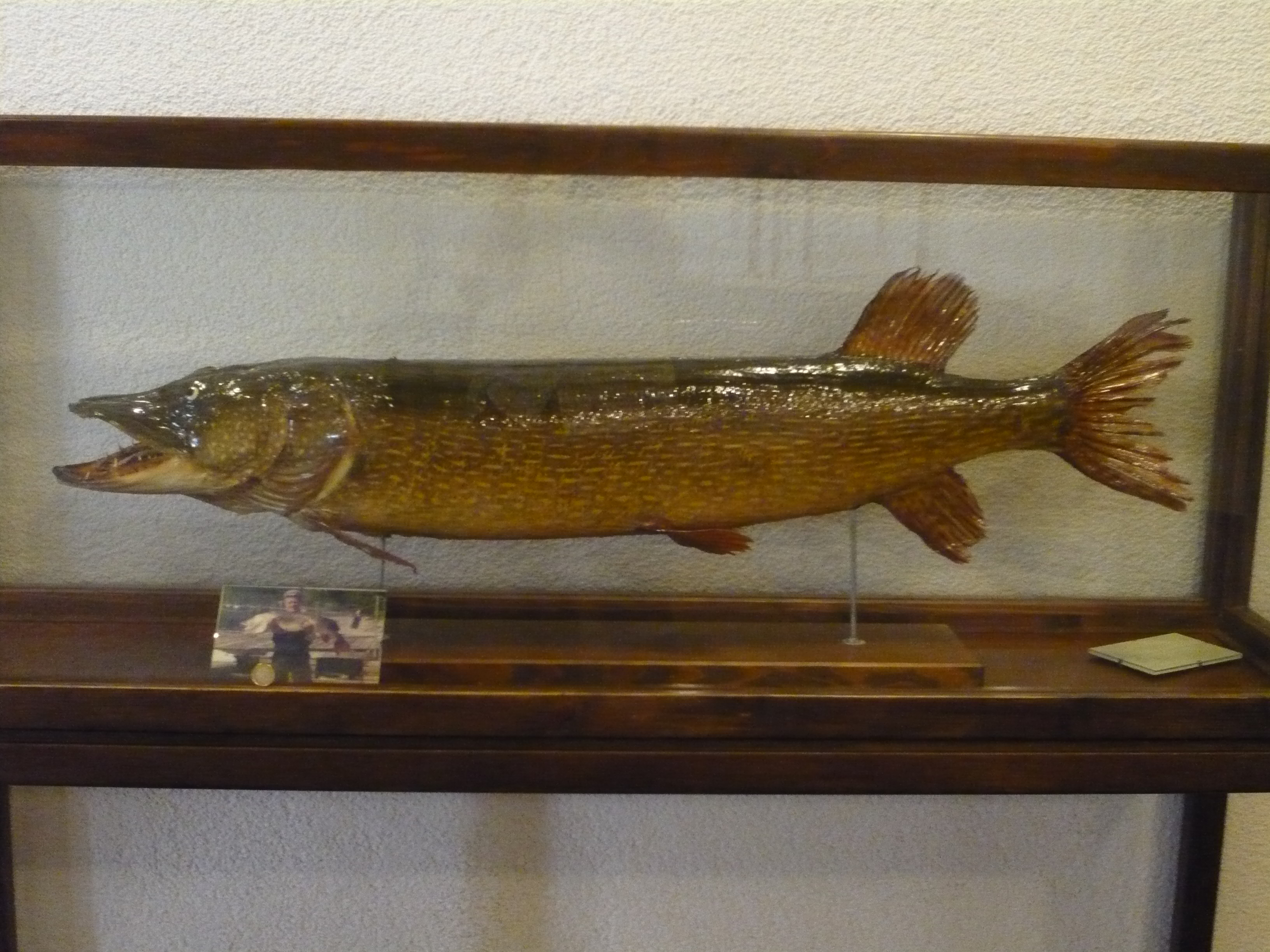
The largest pike caught in the Titisee: 1.40 m (4 ft 7 in) long and weighing 20 kg (44 lb).

In the nutrient-poor Titisee there are large predatory fish (pike-perch, sea trout and a large stock of pike), schooling fish (whitefish, roach and perch) as well as carp, chub and tench in shallower areas. This variety of species is joined by brown trout, char and rainbow trout where the streams enter the lake, and by eels and burbot on the lake bed. In addition there are small fish varieties such as sunbleak, minnow and brook lamprey. Around the lake, grey heron may be seen.

The shores of the Titisee are home to two rare types of quillworts, the spring quillwort and the lake quillwort.

== Photo gallery ==
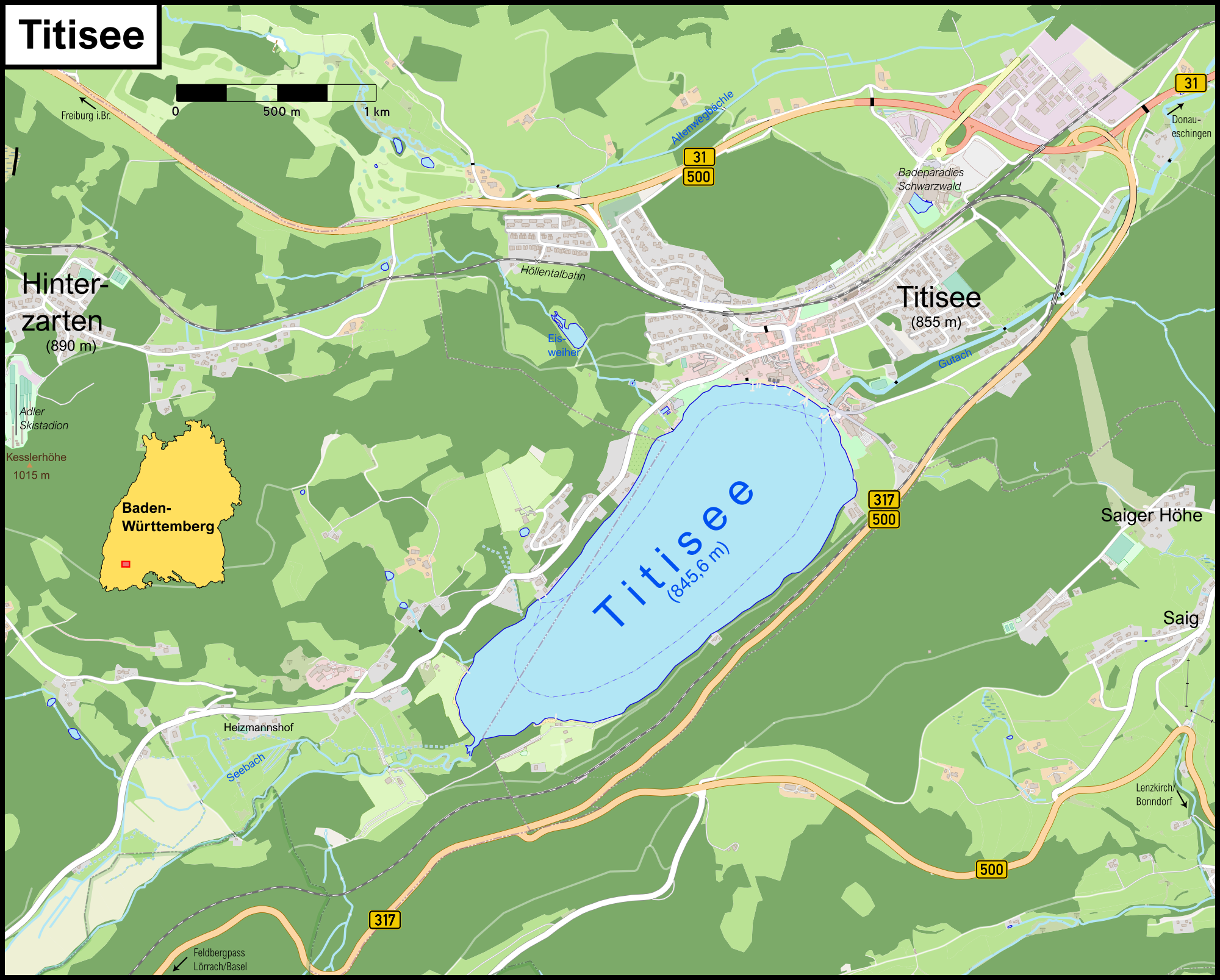
Map of Titisee

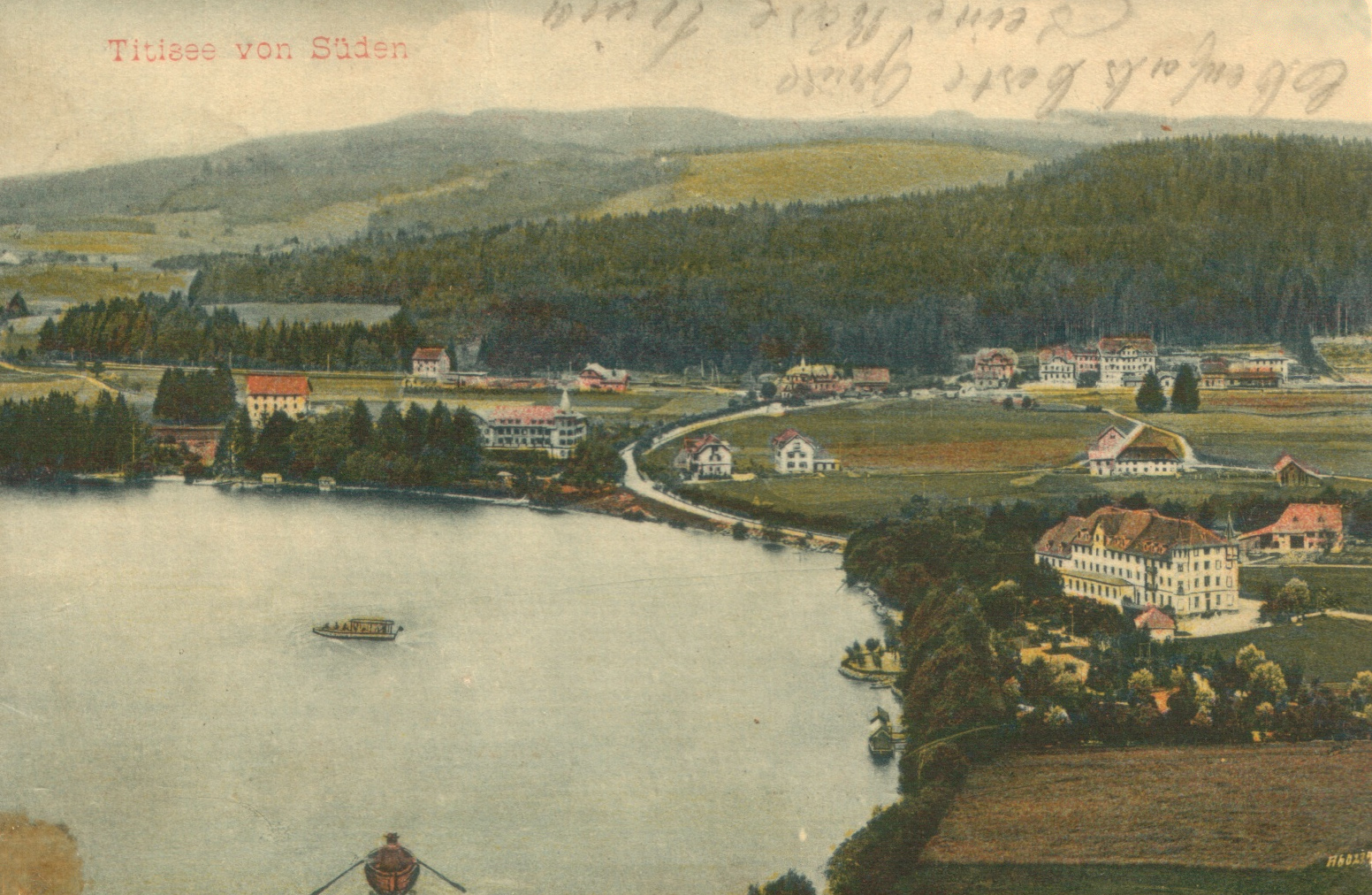
View over Titisee from the south (postcard, about 1909)

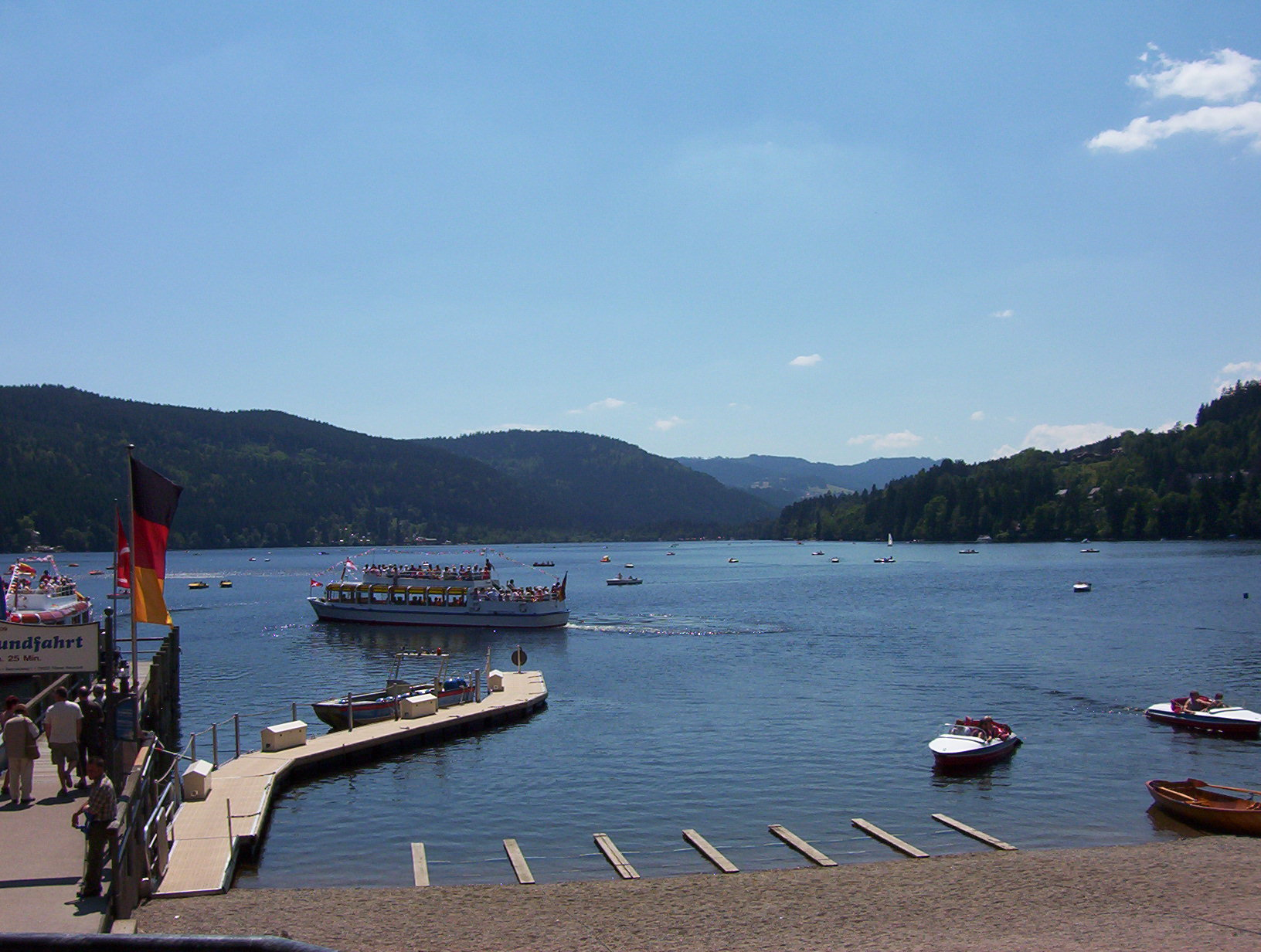
North shore with boat rental

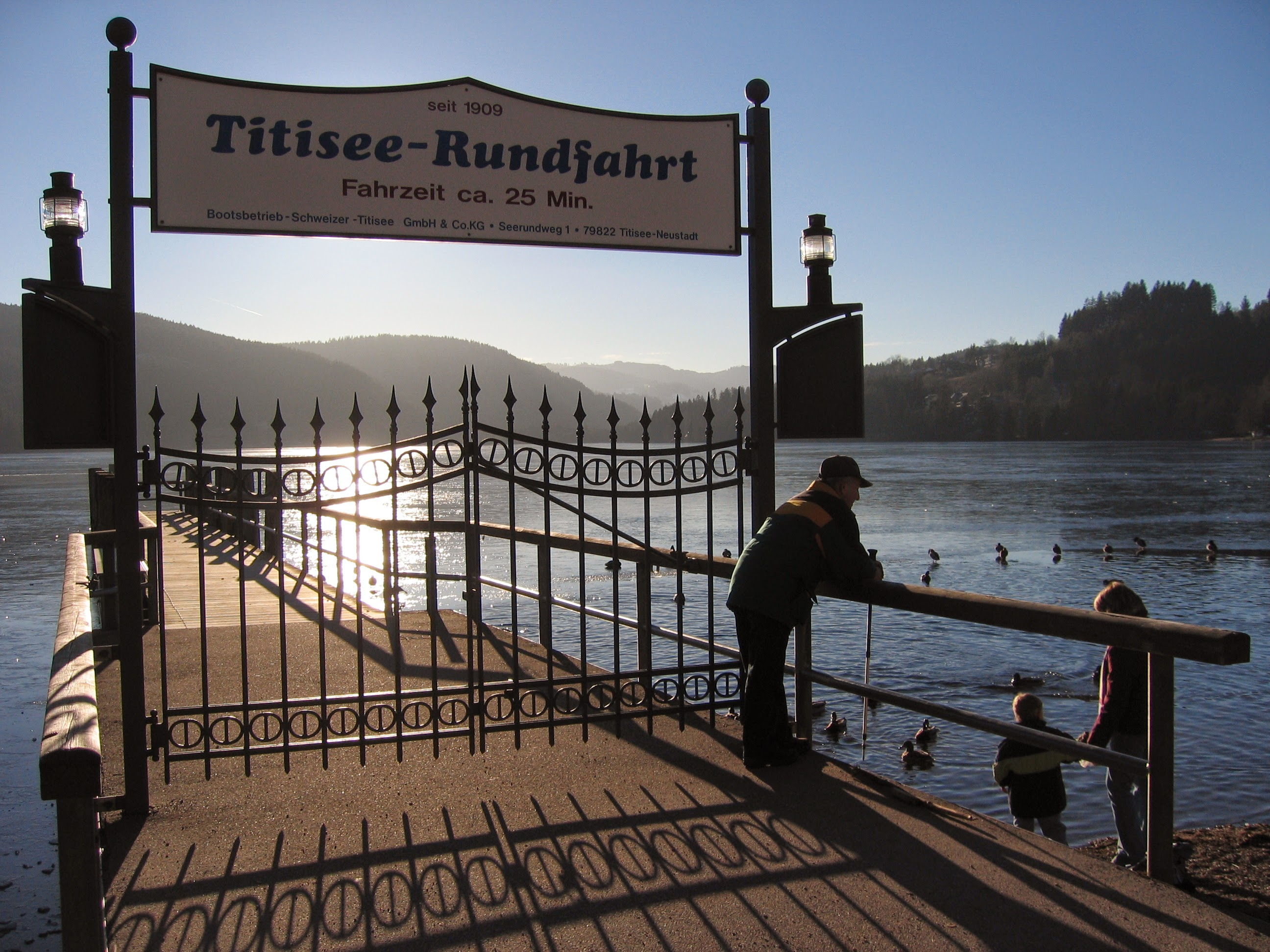
Pier for a touring boat that circles the lake. Winter scene

== Other sources ==
- Nixdorf, B.; et al. (2004), "Titisee", Dokumentation von Zustand und Entwicklung der wichtigsten Seen Deutschlands (in German), Berlin: Umweltbundesamt, p. 29
