= Hochfirst Tower =

Coordinates: 47°54′04″N 8°11′03″E

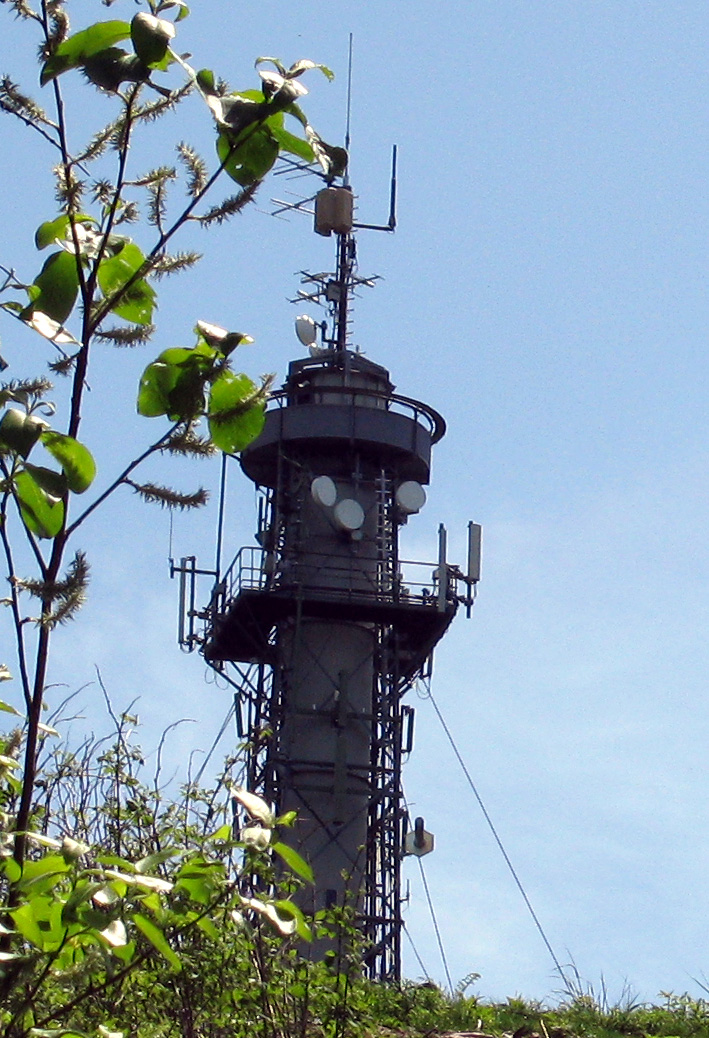
The Hochfirst Tower

The Hochfirst Tower (German: Hochfirstturm) is a 25-metre-high lattice observation tower on the Hochfirst mountain near Titisee-Neustadt at 47°54'04" N and 8°11'03" E.

It was built in 1890 as the replacement for a wooden observation tower. Several observation decks may be accessed by the winding corrugated metal staircase, and the top deck provides panoramic views of the distant Swiss Alps and the Titisee-Neustadt valley. The tower is accessible from the Freiburg-Lake Constance Black Forest Trail and is near the small village of Saig.

Currently, Hochfirst Tower is used for directional radio and mobile phone services as well as for observation purposes. Hochfirst Tower has been further reinforced to withstand the strong valley winds.

== See also ==
- List of towers
