= List of Wingolf member associations =

The following fraternal student associations are all of the active and inactive members of the Wingolf. The latter are considered „vertagt“. In these cases, the tradition is sometimes continued by other fraternities, otherwise only the associations of the alumni remain („Alte Herren“ or „Philister“). Two fraternities are deceased – the Hohenheimer Wingolf, which however has a local successor, and the Danziger Wingolf.

The list also shows the country where the fraternity is based. In the case of an Inactive studentenverbindung, this may vary historically. The city of Königsberg, where the Königsberger Wingolf was located, used to belong to East Prussia and the German Reich, today it belongs to Russia and is called Kaliningrad.

Student association	Charter date	Institution	Location	Couleurs	Coat of Arms	Zirkel	Status	Ref.
Argentina Straßburg	1857		France	Black-White-Gold		zentriert	Inactive	(Note: The tradition is continued by the Frankfurt Wingolf)
Arminia Dorpatensis	October 24, 1850	University of Tartu	Tartu, Estonia	Black-White-Old Gold	rahmenlos	zentriert	Active	(Note: Was originally known as Theologischer Abend, changing to its current name in November 1859.)
Berliner Wingolf	August 11, 1843	Friedrich Wilhelm University	Berlin, Germany	Black-White-Gold	zentriert	zentriert	Active	
Bochumer Wingolf	1967		Bochum, North Rhine-Westphalia, Germany	Blue-White-Gold		zentriert	Inactive	
Bonner Wingolf	December 19, 1841	University of Bonn	Berlin, Germany	Black-White-Gold	zentriert	zentriert	Active	
Braunschweiger Wingolf	1949		Germany	Black-White-Gold		zentriert	Inactive	(Note: The tradition is continued by the Hannoversche Wingolf.)
Bremer Wingolf	1998		Bremen, Germany	Black-White-Gold		zentriert	Inactive	
Breslauer Wingolf	1871		Breslau, Poland	Black-White-Gold	zentriert	zentriert	Inactive	(Note: The tradition is continued by the Mainzer Wingolf)
C.D. St.V Nibelungen zu Siegen im Wingolfsbund	1962		Siegen, North Rhine-Westphalia, Germany	Blue-White-Red	rahmenlos	zentriert	Active	
Charlottenburger Wingolf	1894		Berlin, Germany	Black-White-Gold	zentriert	zentriert	Merged	(Note: founded as a subsidiary of the Berliner Wingolf, reunited in 1955)
Clausthaler Wingolf Catena	1950	Clausthal University of Technology	Clausthal-Zellerfeld, Lower Saxony, Germany	Black-White-Gold		zentriert	Active	
Clausthaler Wingolf zu Marburg	1921	University of Marburg	Marburg, Hesse, Germany	Black-White-Gold		zentriert	Active	
Danziger Wingolf	1923		Danzig, Poland	Black-White-Old Gold	zentriert	zentriert	Inactive	(Note: Philisterverein dissolved in 2008)
Darmstädter Wingolf	1899		Darmstadt, Hesse, Germany	Black-White-Gold	zentriert	zentriert	Active	
Dortmunder Wingolf	1962		Dortmund, North Rhine-Westphalia, Germany	Red-White-Gold		zentriert	Inactive	
Dresdner Wingolf	1924		Dresden, Saxony, Germany	Black-White-Gold	zentriert	zentriert	Inactive	(Note: The tradition is continued by Chattia zu Würzburg)
Erfurter Wingolf Georgia	January 28, 1997		Efurt, Thuringia, Germany	Crimson-White-Gold		zentriert	Active	
Erlanger Wingolf	1850	University of Erlangen–Nuremberg	Erlangen, Bavaria, Germany	Black-White-Gold		zentriert	Active	
Frankfurter Wingolf	1919	Goethe University Frankfurt	Frankfurt, Hesse, Germany	Purple-White-Gold		zentriert	Active	
Freiburger Wingolf	November 7, 1911	University of Freiburg	Freiburg im Breisgau, Baden-Württemberg, Germany|	Black-White-Gold		zentriert	Active	
Gießener Wingolf	August 15, 1852	University of Giessen	Giessen, Hesse, Germany	Black-White-Gold		zentriert	Active	
Göttingen Wingolf	July 19, 1867	University of Göttingen	Göttingen, Lower Saxony, Germany	Black-White-Gold		zentriert	Active	
Greifswalder Wingolf	July 10, 1867 – December 6, 1935	University of Greifswald	Greifswald, Mecklenburg-Vorpommern, Germany	Black-White-Gold		zentriert	Inactive	(Note: The tradition is continued by Clausthaler Wingolf zu Marburg)
Hallenser Wingolf	July 5, 1844 – 1935; 2002	Martin Luther University Halle-Wittenberg	Halle (Saale), Saxony-Anhalt, Germany	Black-White-Gold		zentriert	Active	
Hamburger Wingolf	1919		Hamburg, Germany	Black-White-Gold		zentriert	Active	
Hannoverscher Wingolf	1919		Hannover, Lower Saxony, Germany	Purple-White-Gold		zentriert	Active	
Heidelberger Wingolf	June 17, 1851		Heidelberg, Baden-Württemberg, Germany	Blue-White-Gold		zentriert	Active	
Hohenheimer Wingolf	1922		Stuttgart, Baden-Württemberg, Germany	Red-White-Gold		zentriert	Inactive	(Note: Successor: Hohenheim Wingolf Association Fraternitas Academica)
Hohenheimer Wingolf-Verbindung Fraternitas Academica	July 3, 1947		Stuttgart, Baden-Württemberg, Germany	Blue-White-Gold		zentriert	Active	
Jenenser Wingolf	1921		Jena, Thuringia, Germany	Black-White-Gold		zentriert	Active	
Karlsruher Wingolf	June 27, 1898 – 1909; January 9, 1988		Karlsruhe, Baden-Württemberg, Germany	Black-White-Gold		zentriert	Active	
Kieler Wingolf	1892	Kiel University	Kiel, Schleswig-Holstein, Germany	Red-White-Gold		zentriert	Active	
Kölner Wingolf	1920–1935, 1951		Cologne, North Rhine-Westphalia, Germany	Black-White-Gold		zentriert	Active	
Königsberger Wingolf	1903		Königsberg, Russia	Black-White-Gold		zentriert	Inactive	(Note: The tradition is continued by Hallenser Wingolf.)
Leipziger Wingolf	1855	Leipzig University	Leipzig, Saxony, Germany	Black-White-Gold		zentriert	Active	(Note: Also includes other Leipzig universities.)
Mainzer Wingolf	1949		Mainz, Rhineland-Palatinate, Germany	Black-White-Gold		zentriert	Active	
Mannheimer Wingolf	1953		Mannheim, Baden-Württemberg, Germany	Black-White-Gold	rahmenlos	zentriert	Active	
Marburger Wingolf	February 25, 1847	University of Marburg	Marburg, Hesse, Germany	Green-White-Gold		zentriert	Active	
Münchener Wingolf	December 1896		Munich, Bavaria, Germany	Black-White-Gold	centeer	zentriert	Active	(Note: Was originally called Wittenbergia, changing its name in 1899.)
Münchener Wingolf an der Technischen Hochschule	1901		Munich, Bavaria, Germany	Black-White-Gold		zentriert	Merged	(Note: Founded as a subsidiary of the Münchener Wingolf; reunited in 1908.)
Münsterscher Wingolf	1903		Münster, North Rhine-Westphalia, Germany	Red-White-Gold		zentriert	Active	
Nürnberger Wingolf	1925		Nuremberg, Bavaria, Germany	Black-White-Gold		zentriert	Inactive	
Osnabrücker Wingolf	1983		Osnabrück, Lower Saxony, Germany	White-Black-Gold		zentriert	Inactive	
Rostocker Wingolf	1850		Rostock, Mecklenburg-Vorpommern, Germany	Black-White-Gold		zentriert	Active	
Saarbrücker Wingolf	1957		Saarbrücken, Saarland, Germany	Blue-White-Gold		zentriert	Inactive	
Stuttgarter Wingolf	1900		Stuttgart, Baden-Württemberg, Germany	Black-White-Gold		zentriert	Active	(Note: Includes all universities in Stuttgart.)
Tübinger Wingolf	May 23, 1864	University of Tübingen	Tübingen, Baden-Württemberg, Germany	Black-White-Gold		zentriert	Active	
Wingolf an der Handelshochschule Berlin	1924		Berlin, Germany	Black-White-Gold	zentriert	zentriert	Merged	(Note: founded as a subsidiary of the Berliner Wingolf, reunited in 1955)
Wingolf an der Technischen Hochschule Breslau (Br II)	1919	Wrocław University of Science and Technology	Wrocław, Lower Silesian Voivodeship, Poland	Green-White-Gold		zentriert	Merged	(Note: founded as a subsidiary of Breslauer Wingolf; reunited in 1924)
Wingolf Nibelungen zu Tübingen	1928		Tübingen, Baden-Württemberg, Germany	Purple-White-Gold	rahmenlos	zentriert	Merged	(Note: Founded as a subsidiary of the Tübinger Wingolf; reunited in 1948)
Wingolf Palatia zu Kaiserslautern	1985		Kaiserslautern, Rhineland-Palatinate, Germany	Black-White-Gold		zentriert	Inactive	(Note: The tradition is continued by Heidelberger Wingolf.)
Wingolf zu Wien	1928		Vienna, Austria	Red-White-Green	rahmenlos	zentriert	Active	(Note: Includes all universities in Vienna.)
Wingolfsverbindung Chattia zu Aachen	1952		Aachen, North Rhine-Westphalia, Germany	White-Gold-Red	zentriert	zentriert	Active	
Wingolfsverbindung Chattia zu Fulda	1981		Fulda, Hesse, Germany	Gold-White-Dark Green	rahmenlos	zentriert	Inactive	
Wingolfsverbindung Chattia zu Würzburg	1931		Wurzburg, Bavaria, Germany	Red-White-Gold		zentriert	Active	
