= Künneth =

Künneth is a German surname. Notable people with the surname include:

- Hermann Künneth (1892–1975), German mathematician
- Walter Künneth (1901–1997), German Protestant theologian
