= Ernst David =

Ernst David may refer to:

- Ernst David (musical instrument maker) (1864–c. 1918), German musical instrument maker
- Ernst David (soldier) (1920–1943), German soldier in the Wehrmacht during World War II

== See also ==
- Ernst David Bergmann (1903–1975), Israeli nuclear scientist and chemist
