= Wingolf =

German fraternity association

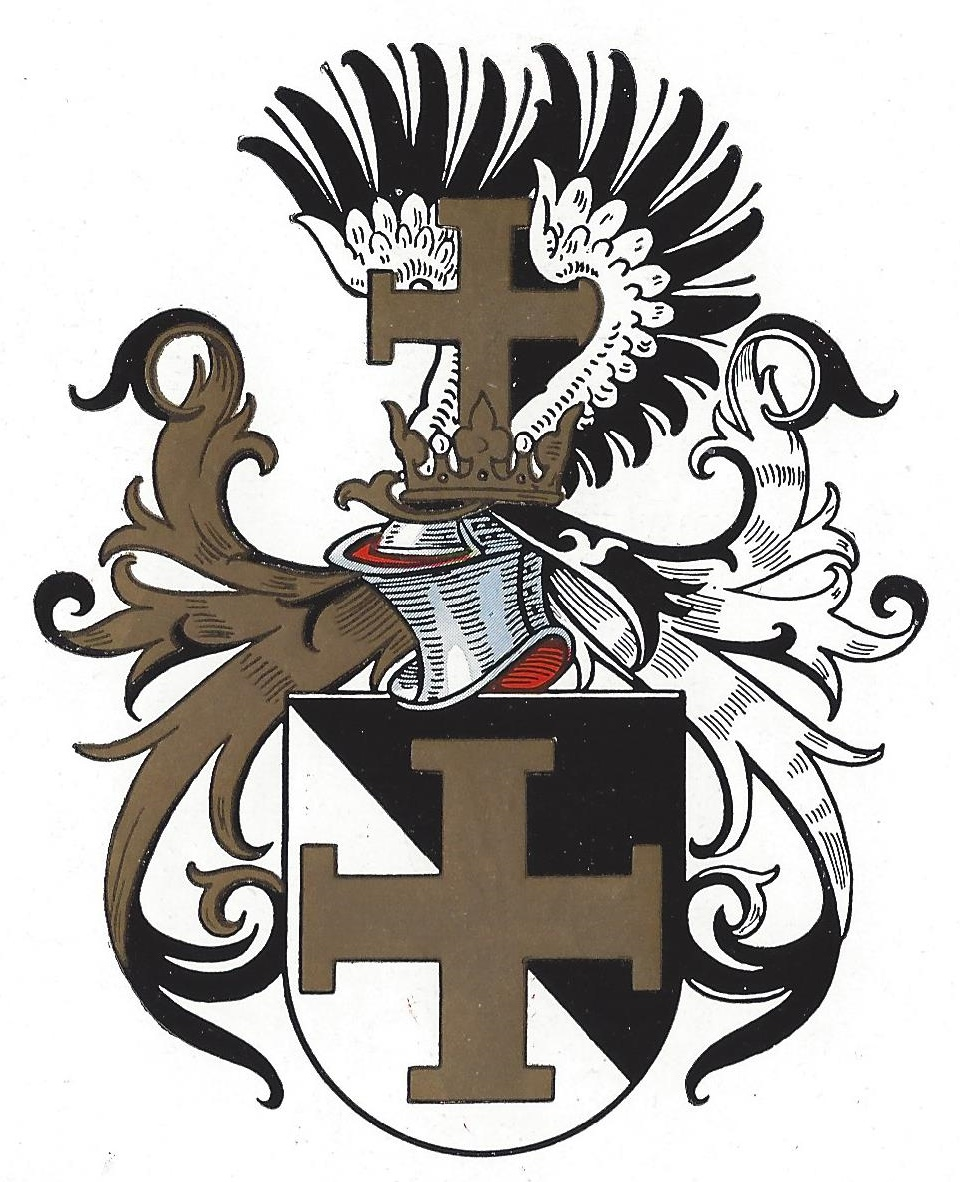
- Founded: 1844; 182 years ago Schleiz, Germany
- Type: Umbrella
- Affiliation: Independent
- Status: Active
- Emphasis: Christian Studentenverbindung
- Scope: International
- Motto: Δι’ ἑνός πάντα Di henos panta "All things through him"
- Colors: Black, White and Gold
- Publication: Wingolfsblätter
- Members: 35 student associations active 5,000 lifetime
- Headquarters: Birkhuhnstraße 2 Lingen (Ems), Lower Saxony 49808; Germany
- Website: wingolf.org

Wingolf (German: [ˈvɪŋɡɔlf]) is a studentenverbindung umbrella organization of 35 student fraternities at 34 universities in Germany, Austria and Estonia. It was established in 1844 in Schleiz, Germany. It is a Christian organization and was the first German fraternity umbrella organisation not to practice academic fencing.

== History ==
In 1844, representatives of student associations from Berlin, Halle (Saale), and Erlangen met in Schleiz, Germany, at what was called the Schleiz Council to discuss forming an umbrella organization for student associations. Later, the Bonn student association joined the group. Bonn, Berlin, Halle and Erlangen officially formed Wingolf or Wingolfsbund in 1844 in Schleiz.

Wingolf was established to be an umbrella organization for studentenverbindung or student associations. It was formed as a Christian organization and was the first German studentenverbindung not to practice academic fencing, a policy chosen because of its Christian ideals.

By the 1920s, it represented associations at forty universities in Germany. The position of secretary general was created to help manage the growing organization. Wingolf participated in the adoption of the Erlangen Honor and Association Agreement between dueling and non-dueling associations in 1922.

Under the political pressures of the Nazi regime in the 1933 and 1934, Wingolf's member organizations were forced to add an "Aryan paragraph" to their policies, excluding thirteen Jewish fraternity brothers from their membership. When membership in the National Socialist German Student Union (NSDStB) became compulsory for students, the Wingolf associations no longer were able to recruit new members because the NSDStB prohibited membership in other student organizations. Finally, Wingolf was forced to merge into a new National Socialist association. Countering the loss of the student side of its organization, alumni formed the Association of Old Wingolfites in 1938. However, little was done by the Wingolf or its members to counter the policies of Nazi Germany.

Wingolf reformed in 1948 but has changed fundamentally. When it held its first post-war festival in 1949 in Eltville, the organization asked for the forgiveness of its Jewish brothers. Because many of its associations were unable to be reestablished because their host universities were now in the Soviet occupied zone, new chapters were established at universities without theological programs. This changed Wingolf into an association of students from many disciplines with an interest in civics and shaping society. However, Christianity remained at the core of Wingolf

Despite external pressures, Wingolf associations approved the Bielefeld Agreement in 1971, declaring a commitment to remaining an all-male organization. After the reunification of Germany in 1990, Wingolf reestablished chapters at universities in Dresden, Halle (Saale), Jena, Leipzig, and Rostock, as well as establishing new associations in Bremen and Erfurt.

Today, Wingolf includes 35 student association at 34 universities in Germany; Wingolf zu Wien in Vienna, Austria; and the Arminia Dorpatensis in Tartu, Estonia. It has approximately 5,000 members. Wingolf is the oldest association of studentenverbindung. Wingolf is one of the oldest ecumenical organizations in Germany. Its headquarters are in Lingen, Germany.

== Symbols ==
The name Wingolf came from Norse mythology; a Wingolf was a vestibule of Valhalla, the hall of warriors who have fallen gloriously in battle. The word was translated roughly as "hall of friends" by Friedrich Gottlieb Klopstock in his “Ode to the Poet's Friends” written in 1767.

The motto of all Wingolf fraternities is Δι’ ἑνός πάντα or Di henos panta, which translates as "All things through him" from Philippians 4, Verse 13. Its couleurs are black, white, and gold. Its members wore these couleurs on ribbons and caps at all events.

Its magazine is Wingolfsblätter.

== Activities ==
On odd numbered years, Wingolf holds a convention, called the Wartburg Festival, in Eisenach, Germany. It has a friendly relationship with the Falkensteinerbund in Switzerland.

== Chapters ==
Today, Wingolf includes 35 student association at 34 universities in Germany; Vienna, Austria; and the Arminia Dorpatensis in Tartu, Estonia.

== Notable members ==
Following is a list of notable members of Wingolf's organizations.

- Albrecht Alt, theologian
- Willibald Beyschlag, theologian
- Gustav Bickell, orientalist
- Friedrich von Bodelschwingh, theologian
- Harald Braun, film director
- Rolf Wilhelm Brednich, ethnologist and ethnographer
- Friedrich Brunstäd, theologian
- Hans Conzelmann, theologian and scholar
- Hermann Cremer, theologian
- Friedrich Delitzsch, Assyriologist
- Konrad Duden, philologist and lexicographer
- Friedrich von Duhn, philologist
- Johannes Heinrich August Ebrard, theologian
- Sigfrid Gauch, writer
- Franz Grashof, engineer
- Adolf von Harnack, theologian and church historian
- Erich Haupt, theologian
- Karl Heim, theologian
- Hermann Volrath Hilprecht, Assyriologist and archaeologist
- Emanuel Hirsch, theologian
- Heinrich Julius Holtzmann, theologian
- Ferdinand Justi, linguist and orientalist
- Martin Kähler, theologian
- Johannes Kahrs, member of the German parliament, Deutscher Bundestag
- Emil Friedrich Kautzsch, Hebrew scholar
- Paul Kleinert, theologian
- August Klostermann, Lutheran theologian
- Johannes Kuhlo, co-founder of the Posaunenchor (trombone choir/church brass ensemble) movement who developed the kuhlohorn
- Walter Künneth, theologian
- Georg Leibbrandt, Nazi Party official
- Friedrich Maurer, philologist
- Carl Meinhof, linguist, one of the first linguists to study African languages.
- Christian Mergenthaler, politician, member of the Reichstag
- Julius Müller, theologian
- Alexander von Oettingen, theologian
- Gottlieb Olpp, medical missionary
- Wilhelm Pauck, church historian and theologian
- Friedrich Wilhelm Raiffeisen, pioneered rural credit unions in Germany
- Albrecht Ritschl, theologian
- Gerhard Ritter, historian
- Adolf Schlatter, theologian and professor
- Paul Schneider, pastor
- August Tholuck, theologian
- Paul Tillich, theologian and philosopher
- Jacob Volhard, chemist
- Theodor Weber, theologian and professor of philosophy
- Theodor Zahn, theologian and biblical scholar
- Matthias Zimmer, politician, member of the Bundestag
- Otto Zöckler, theologian
