= 1556 Wingolfia =

Metallic main-belt asteroid

Discovery
- Discovered by: K. Reinmuth
- Discovery site: Heidelberg Obs.
- Discovery date: 14 January 1942

Designations
- Pronunciation: ˈvɪŋɡɔlfia
- Named after: Wingolf (student fraternity)
- Alternative designations: 1942 AA · 1973 AQ_{2}
- Minor planet category: main-belt · (outer)

Orbital characteristics
- Epoch 4 September 2017 (JD 2458000.5)
- Uncertainty parameter 0
- Observation arc: 75.20 yr (27,468 days)
- Aphelion: 3.7979 AU
- Perihelion: 3.0531 AU
- Semi-major axis: 3.4255 AU
- Eccentricity: 0.1087
- Orbital period (sidereal): 6.34 yr (2,316 days)
- Mean anomaly: 99.491°
- Mean motion: 0° 9^{m} 19.8^{s} / day
- Inclination: 15.750°
- Longitude of ascending node: 91.594°
- Argument of perihelion: 269.34°

Physical characteristics
- Dimensions: 28.65±2.2 km 33.88±2.12 km
- Synodic rotation period: 10 h
- Geometric albedo: 0.093±0.012; 0.1297±0.023
- Spectral type: Tholen = XC; X · M B–V = 0.708; U–B = 0.202
- Absolute magnitude (H): 10.55 · 10.66±0.38

1556 Wingolfia (provisional designation 1942 AA) is a metallic asteroid from the outer regions of the asteroid belt, approximately 30 kilometers in diameter. It was discovered by German astronomer Karl Reinmuth at the Heidelberg-Königstuhl State Observatory on 14 January 1942. The asteroid was named after Wingolf, a student fraternity in Heidelberg.

== Orbit and classification ==
Wingolfia is a non-family asteroid from the background population of the asteroids belt. It orbits the Sun in the outer main belt at a distance of 3.1–3.8 AU once every 6 years and 4 months (2,316 days). Its orbit has an eccentricity of 0.11 and an inclination of 16° with respect to the ecliptic. The body's observation arc begins at Heidelberg with its official discovery observation in January 1942.

== Physical characteristics ==
In the Tholen classification, Wingolfia has an ambiguous spectral type, similar to the X-types (which includes the M-type asteroids) with some resemblance to the carbonaceous C-types. It has also been characterized as an M- and X-type, by direct photometric observations and by PanSTARRS photometric survey, respectively. The Lightcurve Data Base adopts an M-type.

=== Rotation period ===
In October 1990, a rotational lightcurve of Wingolfia was obtained from photometric observations by Italian astronomers at ESO's La Silla Observatory using the ESO 1-metre telescope. Lightcurve analysis gave a rotation period of 10 hours with a brightness variation of 0.15 magnitude (U=2).

=== Diameter and albedo ===
According to the surveys carried out by the Infrared Astronomical Satellite IRAS and the Japanese Akari satellite, Wingolfia measures 28.65 and 33.88 kilometers in diameter and its surface has an albedo of 0.093 and 0.1297, respectively. The Collaborative Asteroid Lightcurve Link adopts the results obtained by IRAS. All diameter measurements are based on an absolute magnitude of 10.55.

== Naming ==
This minor planet was named by the discoverer after Wingolf, which is one of Germany's long-standing Christian student fraternity in Heidelberg, that was prohibited during Nazi Germany, and reinstalled after WWII. The official naming citation was published by the Minor Planet Center in May 1955 (M.P.C. 1221). The asteroid's name was announced on 17 June 1955, during the celebration of the fraternity's 104th anniversary. The discoverer's original citation reads:

Dem Kleinen Planeten (1556) 1942 AA gebe ich den Namen "Wingolfia" zu Ehren der alten, christlichen, in der Hitlerzeit verbotenen und nach dem 2. Weltkriege wieder erstandenen Heidelberger Studentenverbindung "Wingolf", aus Anlass ihres 104. Stiftungsfestes am 17. Juni 1955.

— Karl Reinmuth,
