= Wingolf zu Wien =

Austrian Christian fraternity

- Founded: May 17, 1928; 97 years ago University of Vienna
- Type: Studentenverbindung
- Affiliation: Wingolf
- Status: Active
- Emphasis: Christian
- Scope: Local
- Motto: Δι’ ἑνὸς πάντ Di henos panta Durch Einen alles "All things through Him" (Phil 4,13)
- Colors: Red, White, and Green
- Zirkel
- Publication: Luginsland
- Chapters: 1 with ~130 members
- Headquarters: Lindengasse 1 Vienna; Austria
- Website: www.wingolf.at

The Wingolf zu Wien is an Austrian Christian fraternity (Studentenverbindung) located in the City of Vienna. It is the only member of Wingolf in Austria and unites current students of all Universities in Vienna and alumni. Like all members of Wingolf it does not practise academic fencing. The colours of Wingolf zu Wien are red-white-green.

== History ==
Eight German Wingolfites, who had come to Vienna to study, founded Wingolf zu Wien on May 17, 1928. The original name was Luginsland.

In 1932 the fraternity was accepted into the Wingolf, then renamed Wingolf zu Wien. After the Wingolf in Nazi Germany had been dissolved in early 1936, the Wingolf zu Wien also gave in to pressure from the National Socialists two years later and disbanded in 1938. Nine years after the end of the Second World War, it was re-established in 1954.

After a thriving decade and a rapid gain in members a location of its own could be achieved in 1964. Since then Wingolf zu Wien resides in a Constante ("Etage") in the 7th district of Vienna in walking distance to Mariahilfer Straße and MuseumsQuartier.

The political and social upheavals - especially in the 1960s and 1980s - also had an impact on Wingolf zu Wien and its membership figures. It was not until the winter semester of 1995 that the Wingolf zu Wien was able to re-establish itself thanks to a strong influx from the Tauriscia zu Oberschützen.

The upswing of the 1990s reached its climax for the time being with the assumption of the leadership („Vorortschaft“) of the Wingolf between 1999 and 2001 and the associated organization of the Wartburg Festival of Wingolf 2001.

In September 2005 Wingolf zu Wien was accepted as an associate member of the European Cartel Association of Christian Student Associations (EKV). It is organizationally assigned to its curia of free associations. This makes Wingolf the only not association-free association in the Curia. In 2011, Wingolf zu Wien received full membership in the EKV.

== Symbols ==
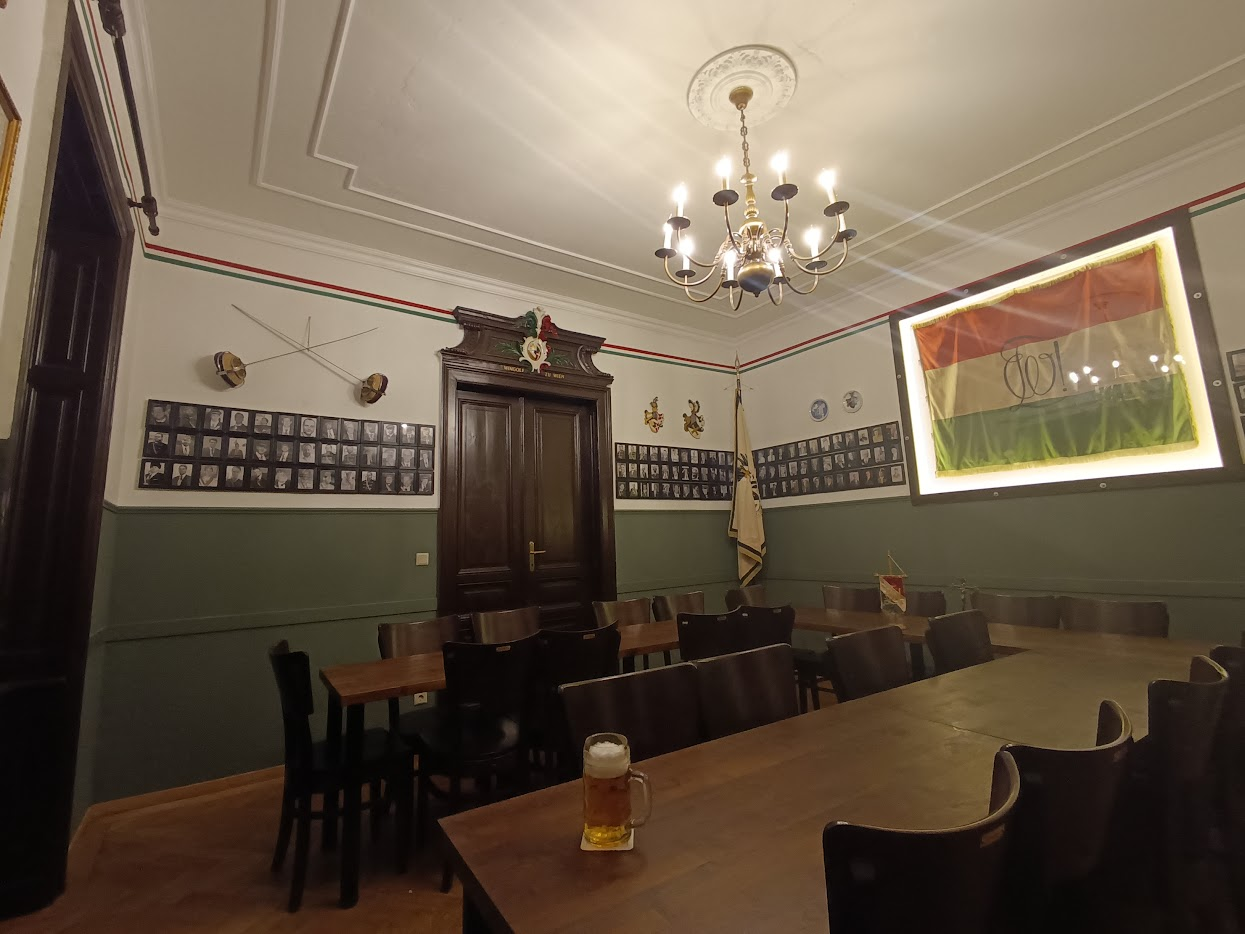
Kneipraum (meeting hall), Wingolf zu Wien

Wingolf zu Wien is known for their red-white-green ribbon, which they have since their first installment in 1928. Additionally they wear a green student Cap. New members or pledges (German "Füchse“) have a ribbon with the colours red-white.

The coat of arms is divided into four parts. On the upper right (heraldically) is the Jerusalem cross. Above left are the colors of the fraternity (red-white-green), and below right the colors of the Wingolf (black-white-gold). The fourth field below left shows a white cross on a red background, the coat of arms of the federal state of Vienna. The decoration on the helmet shows the knight, who is also on the Vienna City Hall (Rathausmann).

All members of the Wingolf zu Wien wear the Bundesnadel. It has a small ring at its tip and is worn on the left lapel. It was donated in 1925.

The fraternity's motto is Δι’ ἑνὸς πάντ or Di henos panta or Durch Einen alles or "All things through Him" from Phil 4,13.

== Special relations ==
A particularly close bond exists to the Munich Wingolf (Munich, Bavaria), which is also geographically the closest Wingolf fraternity. Especially in the early years, Munich Wingolf was very supportive. As a consequence both Seniores (spokesmen) wear the ribbon (colours) of the other association.

In 1958, Wingolf zu Wien itself was godfather to the founding of EMV Tauriscia zu Oberschützen, the first protestant secondary school fraternity in Europe.
