= Student boilersuit =

Costume used in student events

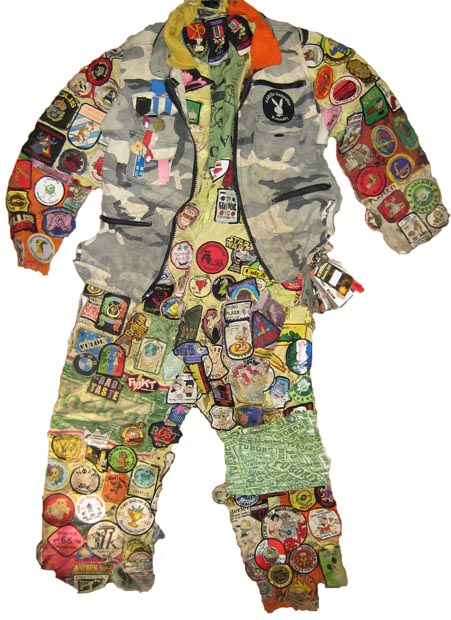
Student boilersuit from Blekinge Tekniska Högskola, Sweden (1998)

Student boilersuit (Swedish studentoverall or studenthalare, Finnish opiskelijahaalari, Canadian flightsuit or coveralls or redsuits) are boilersuits widely used for specific events at universities and polytechnics in Sweden, Finland, and Canada. Typically, the suits are procured by the student associations of faculties or programmes. At the major Swedish universities (like Lund or Uppsala) the use of boilersuits is limited to engineering students, however at Stockholm they are also worn by students of other programs, but their use has spread to students in other fields at some of the smaller university colleges. In Finland, boilersuits have also been foremost identified with engineering students, but see extensive use in all of the student organizations of Finnish institutions of higher learning, such as the University of Helsinki and Aalto University.

== History and use ==
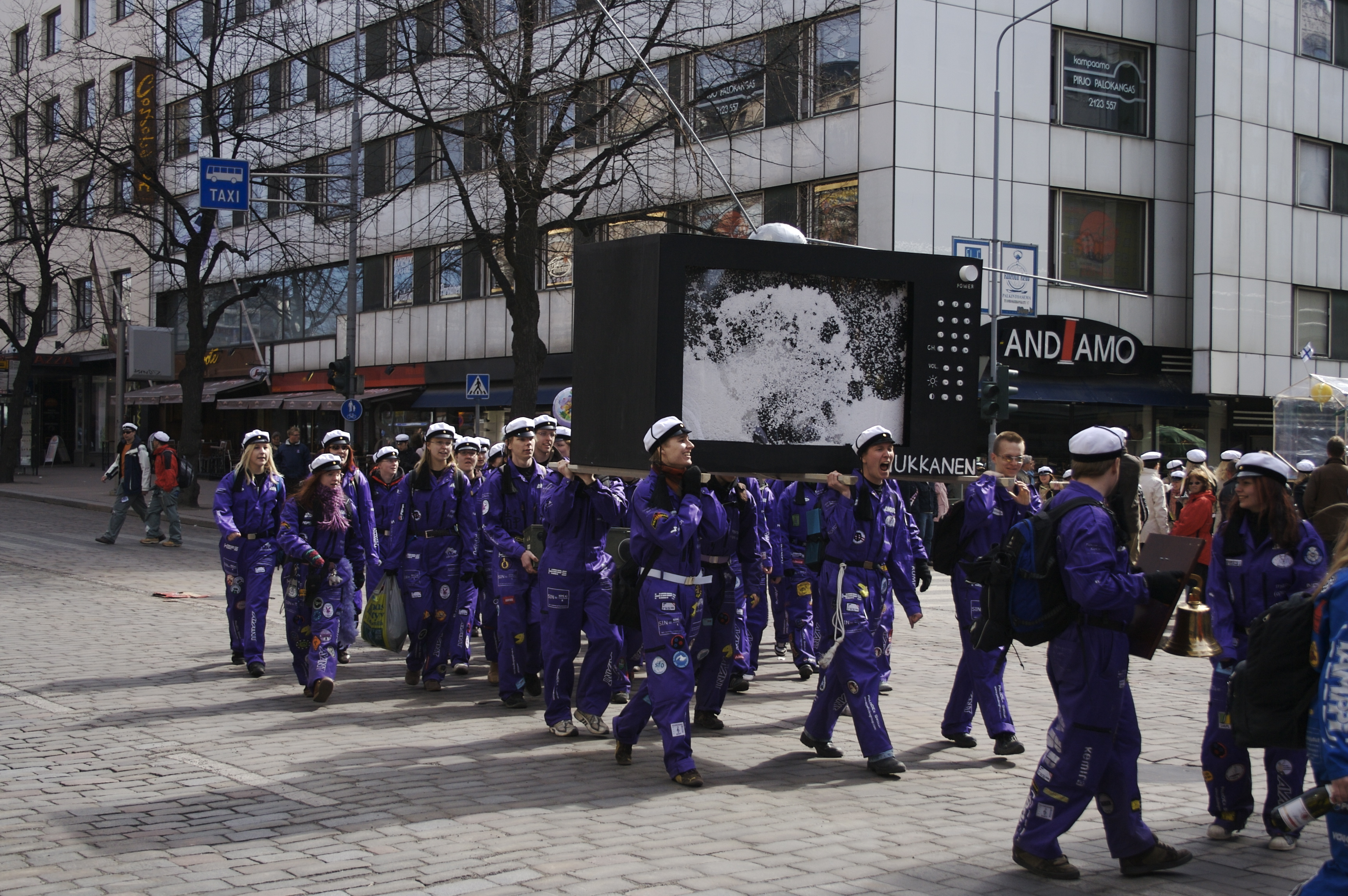
Finnish engineering students in student coveralls

Student coveralls have become one of the most conspicuous academic traditions at some educational institutions, despite its short history. The use of overalls started in the Royal Institute of Technology in the late 1960s, and spread around Sweden and Finland during the 1970s. Apparently protective clothing was needed in excursions to companies, which soon led to use at parties as a way to identify students of different fields and organizations. The height of the use of the overall was reached in the late 1990s. Due to quick rise in popularity, most student organizations now offer the students a chance to purchase their own overalls during the first year of studies. Since the 1990s, the custom has remained popular although perhaps in slight decline as the overalls are sometimes viewed to signal a lifestyle bordering on alcoholism and drunken misbehavior, up to the point where some pubs and clubs even choose to ban the use of overall uniforms.

These boilersuits are not only seen in the Nordic countries. At McMaster University in Hamilton, Ontario, the McMaster Engineering faculty has had a group of representatives clad in red coveralls known as 'redsuits' for decades. Other faculties, societies and student residences have also adopted the suits as a form of identification during McMaster's Welcome Week. At University of Toronto in Toronto, Ontario, the Faculty of Applied Science and Engineering has a distinct group of students who wear coveralls to demonstrate their school spirit. Numerous people throughout the city and campus recognize students in these coveralls as U of T engineers and members of Skule (TM). The University of Waterloo Engineering Students in Waterloo, Ontario, are also identified by their navy blue or grey coveralls, often decorated with significant patches from various interests and activities the student has accomplished over their time at school. Ottawa, Ontario's Carleton University has representatives in dark blue Air Force style coveralls, aptly named the "flightsuits". Likewise, Western University in London, Ontario awards coveralls, nicknamed 'covies,' to student leaders within the Faculty of Engineering (in grey) and Medway-Sydenham Hall (in black).

== Design and appearance ==
Unlike coveralls generally, the student boilersuit isn't used for work, but mostly for parties. However, as the coveralls are meant to endure years of abuse, the wearer often being under the influence of alcohol, the coveralls are made of high-quality fabric and usually at least somewhat waterproof. Practical additions such as zippered pockets of various sizes and belt loops are added by the manufacturer, and as a part of the manufacturing process the coveralls are sometimes printed with the particular student organization's logo and ads of the various sponsoring companies, ranging from small local enterprises to national divisions of multinational corporations. Often, the large corporations choose to sponsor the suits as a part of their recruitment campaign, ensuring that they have the attention of the graduating students when they enter the working life.

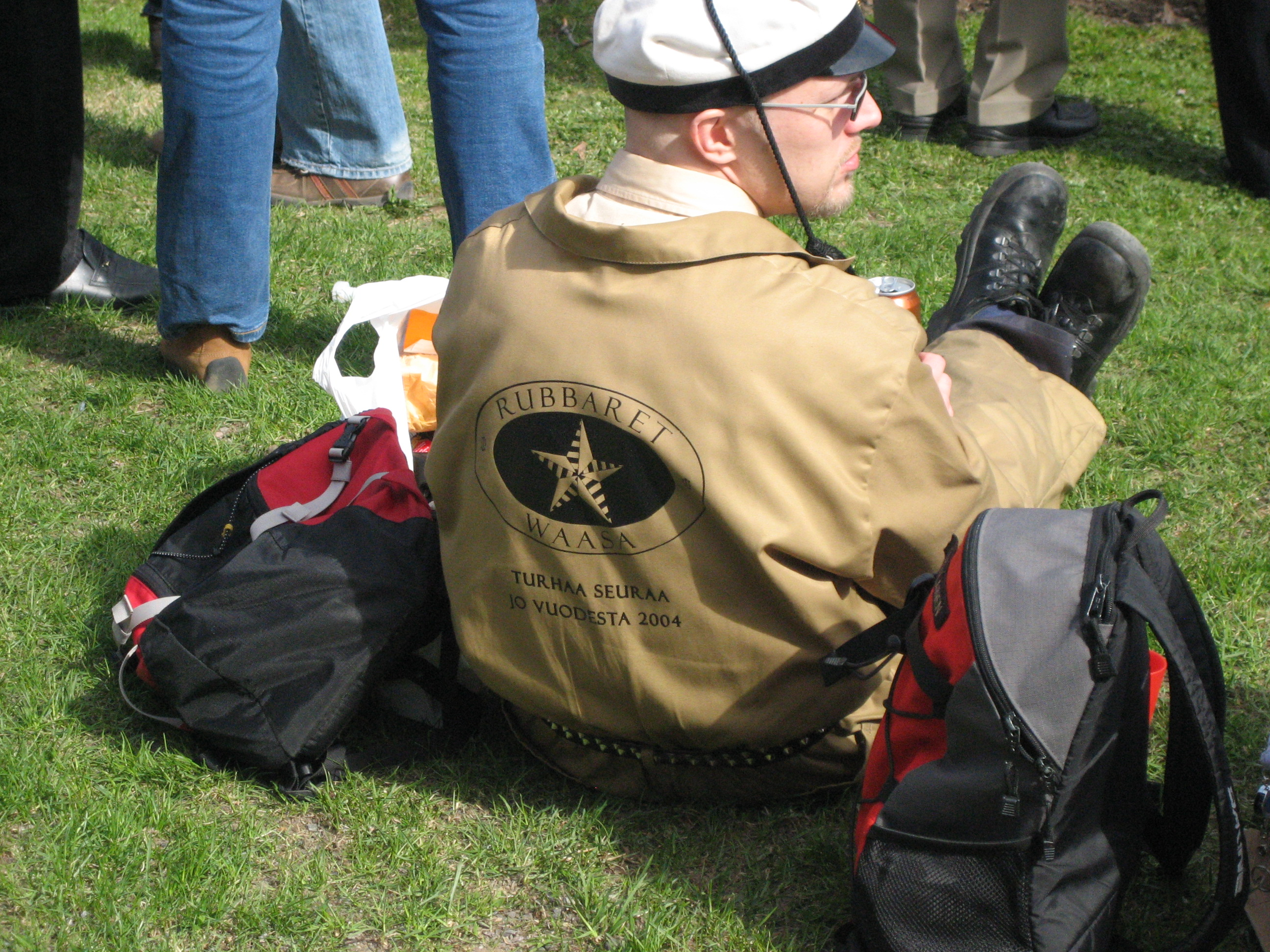
An engineering student of the University of Vaasa wearing a boilersuit and an engineering student cap.

The colour of the boilersuits is usually determined by the faculty or programme, which — the subjects being many and colours few — leads to quite spectacular colour combinations such as purple, turquoise or pink. Multicolored variants exist, but typically the suits are of one color. As it is customary to personalize the suits, they are almost invariably decorated with various badges, souvenirs and inexpensive gadgets. Occasionally a boilersuit will tell of its owner's interests, political views, personal history and even military experience. The time spent as a student can be seen from the amount of decorations one has added to his boilersuit, as all students start with blank boilersuits. There's also a practice of swapping a part of the suit with another person, typically with a partner or a close friend. Badges are also readily swapped, especially amongst friends who are of different organizations. Rarity of a certain badge can be considered a bonus.

Some programs have swapped boilersuits for labcoats. In Lund and Uppsala, labcoats and sometimes bathrobes are used by natural science students.

== Traditions ==
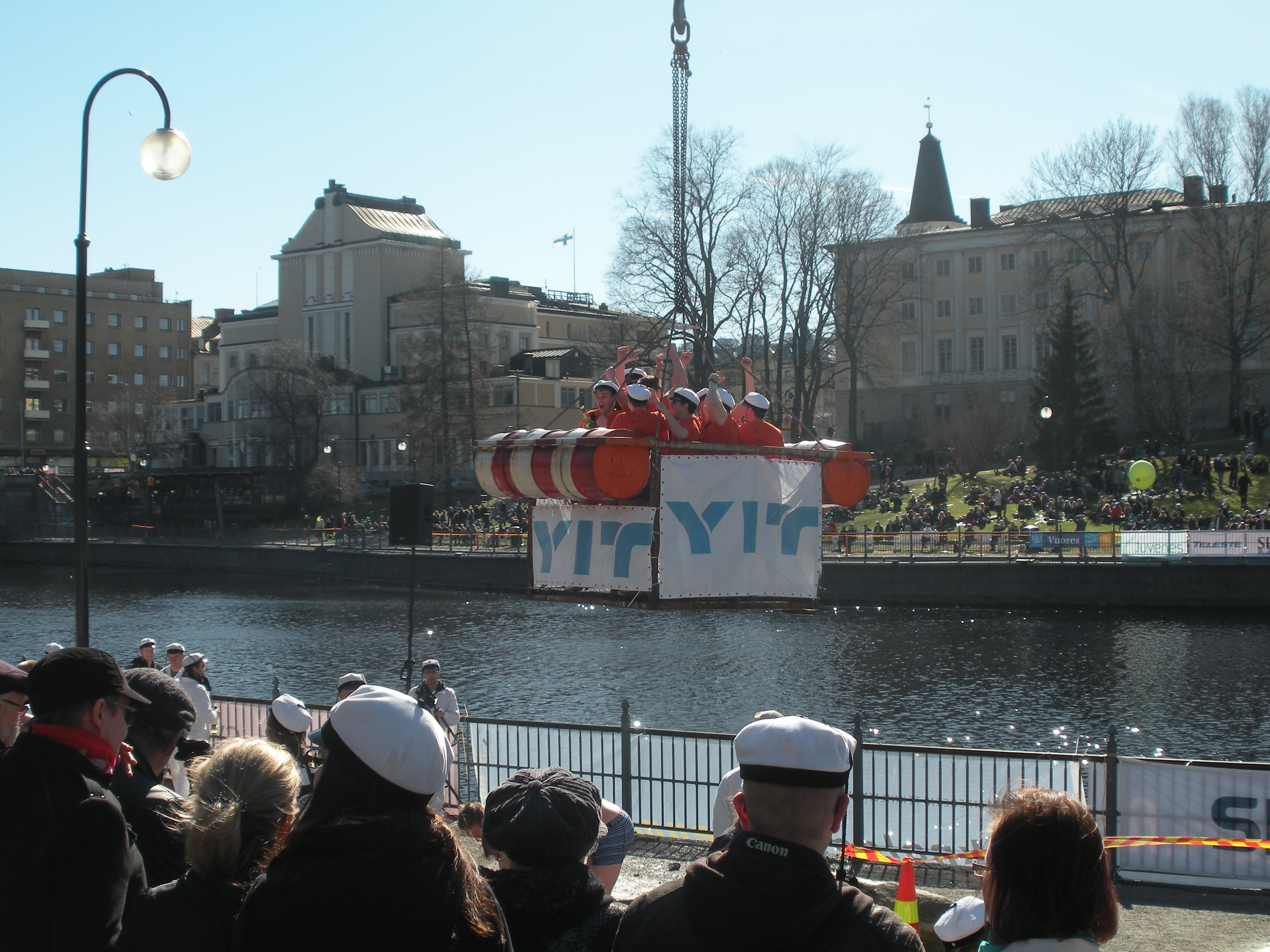
A group of Tampere students about to be lowered into Tammerkoski rapids by crane as part of a "student baptism".

Certain traditions relating to the use of boilersuits exist. Typically, a new student will be given permission to use their boilersuit during the later half of their first academic year, often after a certain number of "freshman points" have been collected by participating in various social events like parties and contests held by the organizations. During the first academic spring, the various engineering student organizations tend to host events during which the new students are officially taken as a members of their organization. During these events, the students often volunteer to go through a minor rite that often includes diving into a pool, lake or river with their newly issued boilersuits as a "student baptism". Typically in Finland these events are held around the largest student holiday of May 1 or Vappu, when thousands of students gather outdoors to celebrate. Lesser traditions can dictate that a student should sew his badges onto his boilersuit by hand, and that the boilersuit should not be cleaned except either by swimming in the suit or by hosing it down.

In some schools, two students who are dating exchange the overalls leg part with one another to show that they are taken. In Finland, it is more common for engineering students to wear their suits as overalls, while non-engineering students more commonly wear them as pants, tying the arms of the suit as a belt of sorts.

== Naming ==
The boilersuit may have local names at individual universities. The Swedish term is simply overall or studentoverall, also studenthalare, but it is sometimes nicknamed ovve. In Finland, the Finnish word for overall is haalarit and the Finland Swedish word is halare. The Canadians refer to them differently depending on the university or area. They are called flightsuits by Ontario's Carleton University, redsuits by McMaster University and coveralls by Western University.

== See also ==
- List of student boilersuit colours
- Academic dress
- Youth culture
- Student cap
