= Walter Künneth =

German Protestant theologian (1901-1997)

Walter Künneth (1 January 1901 in Etzelwang – 26 October 1997 in Erlangen) was a German Protestant theologian. During the Nazi era, he was part of the Confessing Church, and in the 1960s took part in the debate around the demands of Rudolf Bultmann to 'de-mythologize' the New Testament as an advocate of a word-oriented interpretation of the Bible. The Walter Künneth Prize is named after him.

== Life ==
=== Youth and Training ===
Walter Künneth was the fourth child of minister Lorenz Künneth and his wife, Setta (born Setta Schlupper). Young Künneth grew up in the second ministry location of his father, at Hersbruck. His mother died shortly after his birth, due to an illness connected with the birth. After attending the humanities Gymnasium in Erlangen (where he was especially shaped by the neo-Lutheran theology of Phillip Bachmann and the faculty), young Künneth studied evangelical Theology in both Erlangen and Tübingen, from Fall 1920 until 1924, with the last two at Tübingen influenced by Karl Heim and Adolf Schlatter. He attained a doctorate under Friedrich Brunstad in Philosophie in 1924, with a work on Richard Rothe's Idea of God. He also joined the Christian student-organization known as Wingolf.

=== Vocational Developments ===
During his time in Practical Seminary and a curacy in Munich (which lasted until 1926), he was ordained (2/15/25) and met his wife Mathilde, born Mathilde Ammon. In 1926, Künneth was chosen as a lecturer (Dozent) for the Apologetischen Centrale at the evangelical Johannesstift Berlin-Spandau, a department of the central committee for internal missions, where his student colleagues from Wingolf, Helmut Schreiner and Carl Gunther Schweitzer, already were employed. The concern in apologetics there was both the current Weltanschauung and religious situation of the Weimar Republic and the emerging Third Reich. Through a collection of materials that were marketed, published, and renumerated, the "New Apologetic" would give a reckoning for Christian Faith in speech with the modern World : in short, the first evangelical Work Academy was established. In 1927, Künneth left Berlin for Anbach to sit for a second theological exam, and he attained his Lizentiaten with a work on Kierkegaard's concept of sin. After his official Habilitation in Berlin in 1930, he held private lectures in theology and apologetics. By 1932, he had become the leader of the Apologetischen Centrale. Künneth noted, after a search for an angle of Biblical proof, that the Resurrection did not have an adept monographical work. In response, he wrote the often-reprinted Theology of the Resurrection (1933). With Helmut Schreiner, he also published "The Nation of God," which specifically aimed with missionary intent at their own citizens in Germany. Due to the founding of the Deutsche Kirchen in the course of the year 1933, especially the meeting at the Berlin Sports Palace, the book addressed the themes posed by National Socialism: Führer-headship, the obedience principle, Jewdom, and the race question. After the events of 1937, the Centrale was closed and Künneth's work was forbidden. Künneth was also banned from publishing and teaching throughout the entire Reich. In the following year, however, Hans Meiser gave him a ministerial position at Starnberg. In 1944, he was made the deacon of Erlangen. In 1946, he became honorary professor of theology in Erlangen. In 1953, he assumed Werner Elert's chair. In his extensive work after this point, he analyzed state ethics in The Great Waste (1947) and politics in God and the Devil (1954).

=== Engagement with Church Politics ===
Along with the pastor of Dahlemer, Martin Niemöller, and the (at that time) General Secretary of the DCSV (Deutschen Christlichen Studentenvereinigung) Hanns Lilje, Künneth had founded in May 1933 the Young Reformation Movement (Jungreformatorische Bewegung), which opposed the co-opting of the Lutheran Evangelical Church by the Nazi state. Künneth belonged to the "Confessing Church" and also participated in an illegal Church Test-Commission in Berlin-Spandau, under president Hienrich Albertz. In the spring of '35, he circulated a 200-page reply to the standard work on Nazi race theory, Alfred Rosenberg's Mythus des 20 Jahrhunderts. It was entitled : A Reply to the Myth - The Difference between the Nordic Myth and the Biblical Christ. In this writing, he criticized the anti-Christian ideology of Rosenberg, although he shared some of the same concepts, such as "minderwertigen", "zersetzenden", and "Weltjudentum". Based on its large success (36000 copies in three months) the Gestapo replied by questioning him, closing the Apologetischen Centrale, and banning his works. His works were banned across the entire territory of the Reich, and his venia legendi to train others was revoked. He published another work which spoke of the betrayal of Luther in connection with Rosenberg, but this was also seized and destroyed. He was appointed to the vicariate of Starnberg in January 1938 by bishop Hans Meiser of Bavaria, and in 1944, accepted a call back to Erlangen. After the war's end, Paul Althaus made him an honorary member of the faculty there in 1945, and in 1946, he was a member of the Bavarian Land-Synod. Künneth turned down calls to Mainz, Munser, and Kiel, but in 1953 took over the teaching chair of Werner Elert. Unfavorably for his memory, Künneth had during the early Reich period spoken of (limited) cooperation with the Gestapo in the matter of information sharing concerning religious minorities like Jehovah's Witnesses. During the 1960s, Künneth endorsed the death penalty from a theological conviction that opposing it was a sign of moral weakness and national apostasy.

== Later life ==
In 1961, Mathilde died, the mother of his three children: Irmela, Adolf, and Freidrich-Wilhelm. Three years later, he married Gerda Bwtz of Lauban. In 1962, and in 1966, he was awarded medals of honor for service in Bavaria. In 1962, Wartburg Theological Seminary made him an honorary member of faculty. Künneth interpreted Bultmann's challenge to mythologized Christianity as a second Confessional fight, and became the leading member of the group of "No Other Gospel", along with Peter Beyerhaus, Paul Deitenbeck, Rudolf Baumer, Gerhard Bergmann, and Wilhelm Busch. In March 1966, he founded with Baumer the "Düsseldorf Declaration". In the 1960s, he participated in lectures, panel discussions, and other public offerings and debates with thinkers like Gerhard Ebeling, Joachim Kahl, Heinz Zahrndt, Dorothee Solle, Jorg Zink, Ernst Kasemann, Gunther Klein, and Ernst Fuchs; as an ecclesiastical office holder and confessional Christian, he was an anomaly. In 1981, he received the Order of Maximillian for Art and Knowledge. He died 26 October 1997, and a large crowd attended his funeral and burial at the churchyard of Neustadter.

=== Argument with Rudolf Bultmann ===
In the 50s and 60s, Künneth had engaged himself to undertake the struggle against Rudolph Bultmann's demand to "de-mythologize" the New Testament. In the very center of the controversy stands the Resurrection of Jesus, just as the matter of his person and work (Christology). Künneth attempted to answer Bultmann's contention that the essence of the Gospel was the kernel of mythical truth embedded in the three-tiered, mythical Universe without failing to acknowledge Bultmann's insights. He did agree with Bultmann that

If the resurrection is an event on the plane of history, then it also participates in all that determines the nature of history. The resurrection event is then a relative fact in the context of the phenomena and life of history, stands in continuity with a multitude of other known and unknown factors belonging to this world, is an element in historical existence and as such possesses no absolute validity but is subject to conditions and thus to the uncertainties and probabilities of all history. To insist upon the historic character of the resurrection has the result of objectifying it, ... that means... that the assertion of its historicality leads to an irresistible process of dissolution, which ominously threatens the reality of the resurrection itself. ( Künneth, The Theology of the Resurrection (St. Louis: Concordia Publishing House, 1965), pp. 24–25.)

His difference with Bultmann can be described:

It is important now to notice the strategic point of difference between Künneth and Bultmann : Künneth is able to avoid objectifying apologetics and rationalizations without demythologizing. He is able to achieve much the same end by adopting something' like Barth's insistence that though the event of the resurrection truly occurred in our world, it "transcends" historical causality and thus is (fortunately or unfortunately) undetectable by the historian's methods. (from Robert M. Price, "Risen Indeed?")

Künneth believed that although Bultmann was correct that empirical evidence could never decide the matter of the Resurrection (an event which was the Ur-Wunder of God, the prime miracle), and that Bultmann was also correct that saying so would destroy the transcendent content of the Ur-Wunder, still Bultmann had destroyed the Gospel by implying that Christ's victory over our time world of death and sin was a purely mythical one, with no implications for sinful creatures trapped in an immanent world.

== Theologie der Auferstehung (Theology of the Resurrection – 1933) ==
[All footnotes are from the Concordia edition of 1965, St. Louis].

Künneth begins by noting that "the bankruptcy of a secularized theology in the face of the resurrection is (of course) largely due to Schleiermacher", who maintained that the spiritual presence of Jesus and his influence on the disciples he left behind was not contingent on any news of the facts of Christ's resurrection (p. 16). Ritschl added to the confusion by approaching from the other direction: the qualities of the exalted Christ are already contained in his existence in time. Künneth sees this as enormously over-simplistic, and notes wryly, of those who conclude that Christ's resurrection was largely a "vision" of the fervent would-be apostles, that Jesus himself taught that visions from beyond the grave would not alter the religious experience of men (the parable of Lazarus and Dives, Luke 16:29ff). Künneth argues that "the resurrection of Jesus cannot be cut out of" the Christian kerygma/message (p. 36) [either to dispose of it or to explain it]: for that would leave us merely with matters for psychic or sociological investigation, however inadequate, scientifically, these explanations would be to account for the duration, intensity, and persistence of the Christian faith (and here, one cannot help but think of William James's Varieties of Religious Experience). To imagine Dogma to be what Matthew Arnold took it to be, the Aberglaube, or added Belief above and beyond the Facts, would be to imprison Christianity forever within the continuum of space and time, which for Künneth, is subject to uncertainty and mortality and subjectivity. This, in fact, is just what Adolf Harnack had done in Germany, as Arnold was writing in England : Dogma was interpreted, via Higher Criticism, to be a Greek addition to the pure New Testament.

Künneth's reply to Harnack's cultured successors is to explain Aberglaube neither in pietistic terms of a natural Jesus, nor in Bultmann's existential manner of essential myth. His apologetic for the Resurrection, then, is dogmatic and historical at once : he appeals to the Jewish materialistic understanding of the totality of death in judgement, as well as the philosophical inadequacy of ethic-moral explanations that presume upon the immortality of the soul. Künneth absolutely accepted an empty tomb, but he thought that most modern problems with the Resurrection began as dogmatic misconceptions. Künneth would have accepted few of the modern Church's efforts to defend the Resurrection, whether in Van Til's presuppositions, retreatist Pietism that avoids debating the central fact of the religion, or liberal accommodations to the spirit of free inquiry. He might even have disagreed with Alvin Plantinga's formulation of the Resurrection as something that is "plausible might have happened". Künneth seemed to have believed that Time itself was without any meaning unless it had, as its absolute reference point, the unleashing of the exalted Christ out of the tomb.

The liberal retreat into the immanent plenum of sensory experience (with its related Christology of Christ as purely an outstanding "servant of God"), was as unacceptable as Bultmann's accidental denigration of transcendent Truth into something purely mythical (totally ahistorical). Theologie der Auferstehung was his manifesto on the subject, and he updated it many years later, with a chapter on eschatology and the aeon of aeons, as well as more arguments aimed at Bultmann. He also included a new, need discussion on the nature of Time (something Augustine had noted as problematic long ago), in which (predictably) he rejected the dichotomy between eternity and earthly time: "This positing of an exclusive antithesis between time and eternity makes impossible any union of the eternal God with temporal man" (p. 182). Theologie der Auferstehung is tightly argued, copiously footnoted, and conceived with vision : it is no accident that he shares an affinity with Eastern theology on this point (regardless of their emphasis on the Incarnation), noting that the Evangelical Churches in Russia have "a profound grasp of the Easter Act of Jesus Christ" (p. 19). Moltmann may have emphasized the cross, and the Catholic Church the Incarnation, but it is true to assert that for Künneth, the Resurrection is the Archimedean point of eschatology, the meaning of time, history, miracles, dogma, and all else beside. Anything else, he believes, undercuts the early Christian emphasis on Jesus as the risen Kyrios (Lord), who is "risen indeed!". This reprinted "monograph" on the Resurrection was also a reaction to Paul Althaus' doctrines, which he partly agreed with, but who had criticized the original edition, and to whom Künneth respectfully responded.

Arguing from (for him) the reliable witness of Scripture, dogmatically defended, the decisive question for Künneth becomes whether or not the Resurrection appearances of the Risen One were basically of the same nature as the prophetic visions of the Spirit in the Old Testament, which he defined as "an emerging reality which lays hold of man, and is accompanied at the same time by adutions which communicate new knowledge." (p. 82) This was Rudolph Otto's view, he notes, in Aufsatze, das Numinose betreffend. In the place of Yahweh, walking and eating, appears the risen Lord, bearing in his veiled garb, "the marks of the Pilgrim God" (citing E. Fascher, Deus Invisibilis, 1931). Künneth argues for a formal similarity between Old Testament theophany and New Testament opthe. However, noting that the early Church did not place the visions of martyrs on a par with the appearances to the disciples, and insisting that the Resurrection is sui generis among the miracles of God, he cites his old teacher Schlatter:

If the disciples had considered their faith in Jesus to be the product of movements within their own souls, then instead of the Church there would have been a body of mystics busy creating in themselves the ecstatic state by means of which the Christ becomes visible also to them. Geschichte des Christus, 520/523

Building his case he continues: "The Risen One is neither a fantasy, nor a theophany, but the appearance of a new, living mode of existence. The appearance expresses the connection between life beyond death and life within history...the Risen One is in fact precisely not God himself in some sort of disguise, but Jesus of Nazareth, raised and exalted by God." (p. 85). Neither are the appearances repeatable, as prophetic visions were. Nor could the receiver of the vision carry out the task, but fail to communicate the content of the vision, as in the Old Testament. Nor was the form of the vision, and its content, a matter of indifference, so long as the prophetic task was communicated. Künneth argues that this was the reason the Church attached importance enough to the receivers of the appearances to make them eligible to be Apostles, especially proven in the case of Saint Paul. An Apostle had to have eaten and broken bread with the Risen One, or in Paul's case, been confronted on the road to Damascus, an ophthe secondarily attested by supporting visions to other Christians (as requiring a second witness, being an exception that proved the rule).

These revelations were not full, however. Though unique, they were proportioned on the scale the revealing made necessary (p. 87). The reality of the Resurrection is one thing, and its appearance to something else, just as the disciples still await the full, unmediated revelation. This was the paradox and the tension of the primitive Christian experience, which created the nature of the Ekklesia, such as it was and is. "The Risen One reveals in the appearances his glorified existence" (p. 87). Central to this is corporeality, of a kind which prohibits both spiritualizing and materializing. Künneth rejects the classic Lutheran commentator Quenstadt's definition of Christ's new body: "reproductio sive reparatio of precisely the same body as was destroyed by death, ex atomis sue particulis illius corporis hinc inde disiectis atque dissipatis"(p. 88), just as he rejects Bultmann's mythical Christ. The appearances point to a soma tes doxes (Phil. 3:21) and soma pneumatikon (I Cor. 15:42), developed by Paul.

The apostleship does not hinge upon Jesus' calling of the disciples while alive, but upon Christ's appearances to the disciples, among whom James and Peter were chosen first of all, a significance the early Church did not miss. "Paul sees the diakonis (Acts 20:24) and the apostole to world mission (Rom.1:5/Gal1:1) as received directly from the Christ who has risen and appeared to him. Accordingly he knows himself to be an ambassador, a leitourgos, a doulos of the Lord (Rom15:16/Gal1:10, p.90). The Ascension itself is the last, specially significant appearance of "the Risen One", and not a parallel miracle to the Resurrection. Even the empty tomb is subordinated to the Resurrection: that the tomb was empty was part of the Gospel, entailed by the appearance corporeal of the glorified body of the Risen One. The inverse of this would not have been necessarily true, and so the empty tomb is implied, but not emphasized: an empty tomb alone could have indicated many various things. Emil Brunner's note that Paul does not mention the empty tomb does not entail a conflict between Paul's Gospel and the original apostles (p. 92). Again, Künneth defends the extreme middle : the Church becomes increasingly focused on an empty tomb (as the original witnesses die off), yes, but "the decisive question remains open, how far an essential concern of the primitive Christian Church is expressed precisely in this tendency". Therefore, "according to the church tradition about the resurrection event handed down by Paul in I Cor 15:1ff, a difference between the experience of Paul and of the original apostles seems impossible".

Künneth understood that the dogmatic theologian, "of all people", had to be willing to make his views on the Resurrection event precisely and definitively known (p95). For him, the empty tomb was a sign, interpreted by the ophthe to the apostles. The empty tomb expresses Resurrection's "face towards history" (p97), proof that its power touches the vale of tears of matter undergoing history. Yet, God's power is not bound to or by the substratum of Creation. The Resurrection touches history, and lives within it, but is not conditioned by it. In this, he concurs with Bultmann, although he disagrees with Emil Brunner that one cannot make dogmatic, plausible, and adequate statements about what happened in the Resurrection Ur-Wunder. "It will no longer do to speak vaguely and obscurely about it, as Albert Scweitzer rightly accuses theology of doing" (p95).

Christology, then, is not the disinterested description of given, immanent facts, nor the intellectual clarification of religious experience. "Christological knowledge is characterized by the standpoint of faith, appears as a function of faith, and is meaningful only in the situation of faith" (p112). Künneth declines to embrace (fully) both Logos Christology (Christ the human as pre-existent) and Spirit Christology (Christ as a man divinized by his flawless good deeds and pure religious nature). Nor does he believe that the new, paradox Christology of his day does anything more than restate the problem more eloquently: "it does not take us beyond the balanced static relationship between the historic man and the reigning Christ, beyond the basic starting point of the two-nature doctrine" (p116). Nor does he appeal to the "faith-community" alone, which leaves Faith without a decisive content. He is acutely aware that, from a Christian standpoint, "heresy" is "that which exalts a partial truth into the thing that matters most" (p117).

Christology is Resurrection Christology. Künneth believes that the Son has no part in either time-bound humanity, nor divine majesty : the transcendent Son belongs with God, but is at the same time in subordination to God. Jesus does not share power, rank and dignity with the Father. He is essentially homogeneous with the divine image, which distinguishes him from man and connects him with God. But he does not share divine majesty until after the Resurrection, when the Father exalts the Son (later on in his treatise, Künneth discusses the aeon of aeons, in which the Son returns the dominion to the Father). Künneth goes so far as to say "we have to consider whether the post-Easter situation may not have led Paul to a profounder and more universal Christological knowledge than was possible to Jesus before his resurrection" (p120 - John 1:1, 8:58, 17:5,24; Phil 2:5ff). Pre-existence refers to the Sonship, not the archonic majesty of the Father [one might rightly note, in this, a sympathy towards the Orthodox rejection of Filioque in the Creed]. Christ's pre-existence in the precondition of his one-day receiving the Kyrios. The Pauline concept of kenosis does not mean that the Son emptied himself of majesty, which he did not yet possess, in fact. The true humiliation is in the change of the status of the Son in relation to both his Father, and to the world. The Son becomes sin, placing himself as a servant under both man and God, and in a position of condign and transferent punishment from the Father. "His exposure to the creaturely and sin-riddled character of human existence raises for the Son the question what is the real will of God and gives birth to the inner struggle for insight into God's plan" (p123). He cites I Cor. 15:45–47: "The second man is from heaven", noting that he disagrees with his contemporary, Paul Althaus on precisely this point : Jesus receives majesty in Matthew 28:18, not before. Nevertheless, it is true and certain that the Son possesses divine Being and Essence, as Althaus insists (Phil2:6). The Messiah is "he who is on his way to Resurrection" (p127).

To sum up, the Resurrection is grounded in the obedience of the life and death of Jesus, the servant of God who is also the pre-existent Son. The historical memory and reality of Christ protects against cultic excess and also helps form living pictures of God for those who following, must live by faith (p124).

== Extra-Calvinisticum ==
Quoting William Placher, Domestication of Transcendence, Louisville, 1996, (p. 66) : "In the famous extra-Calvinisticum, Calvin insisted, against Luther, that something of God's infinity remained uncaptureable in God's finite self-revelation in Jesus Christ...this does not imply, I think, that what we know of God is false, but only that, while true as far as it goes, it is necessarily limited to our finite capacities. Calvin's real concern here seems to have been to preserve the reality of the Incarnation, which appeared to him threatened by a view in which even Christ's humanity took on divine infinity and thereby ceased to be really human." [2.13.4 and 4.17.30 are the relevant passages in the Institutes].

If we accept that the extra-Calvinisticum's motto, Finitum non-capax infinitum (the finite is not capable of the infinite), is a sound insight, it would appear that Künneth is adjusting or even giving up a strictly Lutheran view on the subject, while simultaneously providing a new and better explanation for the significance and resolution of the Lutheran and Calvinist debates over the presence of the body of Christ. In separating the issue from the Eucharist, and in essentially coming down on the side of Calvin's principle, Künneth has driven a wedge into dogmatic discussions of God that would prohibit such discussions apart from the doctrine and the historical reality of the Resurrection : in fact, he has conjoined them in the person and work of the Son, the bearer of both the infinite (in latent, pre-existent, and divinely right form) and the finite, through the vehicle of servanthood to both God and man. It is important to remember that for Künneth, Christ assumes our mortality in more than the fashion of "putting on the clothes of our flesh" (the Gnostic view of appearances), but that he is not half-human, nor is Jesus subordinated to "time-bound humanity" : he is the transcendent Son. For Künneth, steering a path between Gnosticism on the one hand, and empirical Liberalism on the other, does not mean accepting the neo-orthodoxy of the paradox theologians. If we accept Placher's "post-liberal" reasoning on the subject, the answer as to how he does this is that he returns to the issue of the extra-Calvinisticum : that is, he returns to a wrestling with Christology that accepts the Nicene Creed, but that (unlike Logos Christianity), is unwilling to interpret the difficult Pauline passages about the Recapitulation and the relationship between the Father and the Son solely in light of a simplistic and literal reading of the first chapter of John.

== Sources ==
- Jochen Eber (2002). "Künneth, Walter". In Bautz, Traugott (ed.). Biographisch-Bibliographisches Kirchenlexikon (BBKL) (in German). Vol. 20. Nordhausen: Bautz. cols. 886–895. ISBN 3-88309-091-3.
- http://www.wheaton.edu/bgc/archives/docs/Berlin66/kunneth.htm
- http://www.robertmprice.mindvendor.com/art_risen_indeed.htm
