= Ritschl =

Ritschl is a surname. Notable people with the surname include:

- Albrecht Ritschl (1822–1889), German theologian
- Carl Ritschl (1783–1858), German bishop and composer
- Friedrich Wilhelm Ritschl (1806–1876), German classical scholar
- Otto Ritschl (1860–1944), German theologian

== See also ==
- Ritschel
- Ritz (disambiguation)
