= Johannes Kuhlo =

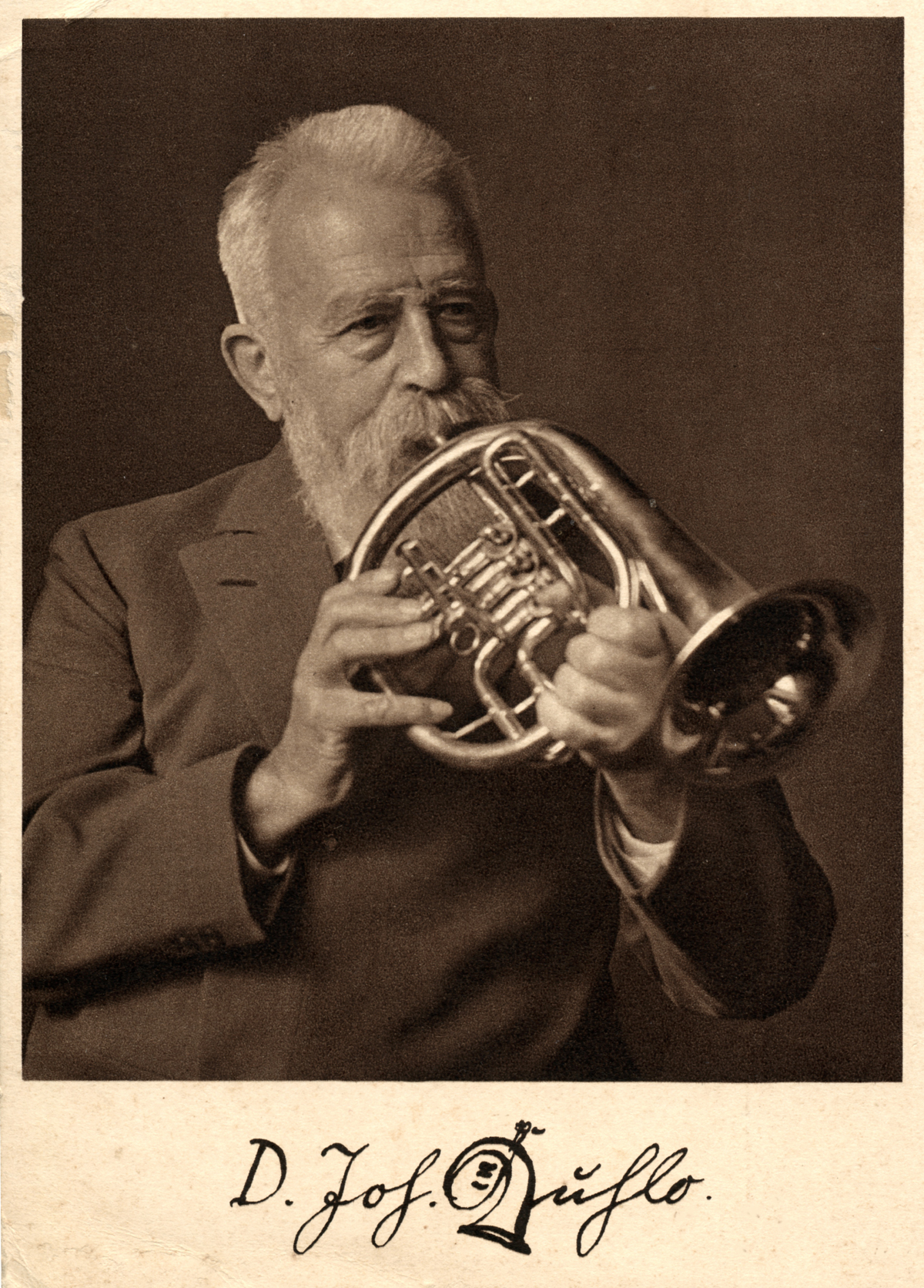
- Johannes Kuhlo playing a kuhlohorn
- Born: October 8, 1856; Gohfeld, Germany
- Died: May 16, 1941 (aged 84); Bielefeld-Bethel, Germany
- Occupation: Minister & Musician

Karl Friedrich Johannes Kuhlo (8 October 1856 in Gohfeld, now Löhne, Germany – 16 May 1941 in Bielefeld-Bethel, Germany) together with his father Eduard Kuhlo, founded the German Protestant Posaunenchor (trombone choir/church brass ensemble) movement. Working in collaboration with the Bielefeld instrument maker Ernst David he developed the kuhlohorn for use by the ensembles (among other brass instruments).
