= Ritschel =

Ritschel is a German surname. Notable people with the surname include:

- Georg Ritschel (1616–1683), Bohemian Protestant minister and educator
- Manfred Ritschel (1946–2026), German footballer
- William Frederic Ritschel (1864–1949), German-born American painter

== See also ==
- Ernst Friedrich August Rietschel (1804–1861), German sculptor
