= List of student boilersuit colours in Sweden =

This is a list of student boilersuit colours including the colours of equivalent student dress if no boilersuit is used.

== Blekinge Institute of Technology ==
Colour	Program/Faculty
Orange	School of Future Entertainment (obsolete)
Light Blue	Media Technology (obsolete)
Purple	Web Development
Brown	Digital Games
Light Brown (camel coloured)	Cross Media (Obsolete)
Pink/Fuchsia (previously a more baby pink colour)	Digital Sound Production
Dary Grey	Digital Graphic Design
Red	Mechanical Engineering
Green	Nursing
Light Green	Literature, culture and digital media/Humanities
Wine Red	Spatial Planning
Marine Blue	Telecommunications, Tele/ICT, Medical Engineering, Technical Artist, Game Programming, Software Engineering; MSc in Industrial Engineering, Computer Engineering and Software Engineering (BITS)
Yellow	Computer-/System Sciences(ARON)
Blue	Social Sciences
Red	Economics
Military Green	IT-safety and MSc in Computer Safety
Black	MSc in Computer Engineering (RISC) (obsolete)
Turquoise	MSc in Industrial Engineering (RISC) (obsolete)
Mint Green	MSc in System Development (RISC)
White	Telecommunications, Tele/ICT, Medical Engineering (with black, red, purple and green leg seams respectively) (obsolete) (TSF)
Light Green	System Development (RISC) (obsolete)
Purple	Game Programming (RISC)(obsolete)
Yellow	Interaction and Design (ARON) (obsolete)
Orange	Human ICT Workplaces (DASC) (obsolete)
Purple	Computer Engineering(RISC)(obsolete)

== Chalmers University of Technology ==
Colour	Program/Faculty
Blue	Civil Engineering and Building Techniques
Brown	Mechanical Engineering
Yellow	Electrical Engineering
Lila	Industrial Engineering
Orange	Computer Engineering
Black	Applied Physics
Black with Red Text	Engineering Mathematics
Red	Architecture
Red with Blue Text	Architecture and Engineering
Turquoise	Software Engineering
Grey	Automation and Mechatronics
Cerise	Bachelor

== Gothenburg School of Business, Economics and Law ==
Colour	Faculty
Marine blue, Cornflower Blue and White in different patterns, depending on the year of production.	Sexmästeriet - Trade Pub

== Halmstad University ==
Colour	Faculty
Black	ASP
Grey	BYGG
Pink	EKP
Blue	HPP
Green	IMP
Green	INFO
Purple	PIM
Green	LUT
Red	MASKIN
Blue	Technical Base Year
Red	OLAV/SOSH
Blue	SJUK
Orange	SOK
Beige	TBI
Yellow	U
White	X-CHANGE
Yellow	ÖDET

Each faculty comprises these programmes
Faculty	Programmes
ASP	Enterprise Systems Program, 180 credits
BYGG	Construction and Real Estate Business Programme, 180 credits Construction Engineer, 180 credits
EKP	Study Programme in Business and Economics, 240 credits Business Administration and Economics Programme, 180 credits
HPP	Health Education, 180 credits Media and Communication Studies: Focus Health, 180 credits
IMP	International Marketing Programme, 180 credits
INFO	IT Forensics and Information Security, 180 credits Digital Design and Innovation, 180 credits Network Design and Computer Management, 60 credits
PIM	Psychology - Sport and Exercise, 180 credits Professional Career in Sport and Working Life, 180 credits
LUT	Pre-School Teacher Education, 210 credits Primary Teacher Education - pre-school class and school years 1–3, 240 credits Primary Teacher Education - school years 4–6, 240 credits Subject Teacher Education for Upper Secondary School - Swedish and English, 300 credits Subject Teacher Education for Upper Secondary School - Science Studies and English, 300 credits Additional Teacher Training (VFU) - school years 7–9, 90 credits Additional Teacher Training (VFU) - upper secondary school, 90 credits
MASKIN	Mechanical Engineering, 300 credits
Technical Base Year	Preparatory, 0 credits
OLAV/SOSH	Work and Welfare - Management and Organization - Work Science, 180 credits Social Change and Social Sustainability, 180 credits
SJUK	Nursing Programme, 180 credits
SOK	Political Science - Social Analysis and Communication, 180 credits Culture and social development, 180 credits
TBI	Sustainable Energy Engineer, 180 credits Biomedicine - Exercise Physiology, 180 credits Environment, Innovation and Sustainability, 180 credits Conservation and Diversity, 180 credits
U	Programme in Innovation Engineering, 180 credits
X-CHANGE	For exchange students
ÖDET	Computer Science and Engineering, 300 credits Intelligent Systems, 300 credits Computer Engineer, 180 credits Electrical Engineer, 180 credits Mechatronic Engineer, 180 credits

Programmes

== University of Gothenburg ==
Colour	Faculty
Red	Mathematics, Computer Science and Physics (ReKo)
Red with green on the left leg	Pedagogsexmästeriet, P6
White with a tiger patterned leg and a Black/Red stripy arm	SystemSex
Black with purple text on the right leg	AgentGbg

== University of Jyväskylä ==
Colour		Association: Majors
Green		Abakus ry: Special Education Teachers
Red	Blue	Asterix ry: Romance languages
Purple		Corpus ry: Literature, Museology, Arts
Wine Red		Dumppi ry: Information Systems Science
Orange		Emile ry: Education and Adult Education
Black		Fokus ry: Social Sciences
Blue	Black	Linkki Jyväskylä ry: Information Technology
Green		Lööppi ry: Journalism
Red		Magna Carta ry: English
Green		Nefa ry: Ethnology and Anthropology
Red		Parku ry: Communication
Black	Yellow	Pedaali ry: Music education
Red		Pedago ry: Primary School Teacher Education
White		Pörssi ry: Economics
White		Radikaali ry: Chemistry
Light Blue		Sane ry: Finnish
Black		Sporticus ry: Sports and Health Sciences
Yellow		Stimulus ry: Psychology
Black		Sturm und Drang ry: German
Yellow	Blue	Svenska Klubben ry: Swedish
Green		Syrinx ry: Biological and Environmental Sciences
Red	Black	Tosine ry: History
Green		Varkaat ry: Early Childhood Education
Light Blue		Viito ry: Finnish Sign Language
Dark blue		Ynnä ry: Physics, Mathematics

== Jönköping University Foundation ==
Colour	Faculty
White	Health Department
Red	Pedagog Students (LOK)
Blue	MKV, IA and PP students (LOK)
Green	Jönköping International Business School
Yellow	HI TECH
Black	Qult
Pink	Student Union

== University of Borås ==
Colour	Faculty
White	Sexmästeriet
Turquoise	Boring
Dark Blue	7k
Green	Otyg
Yellow	Svina
Black	Klemming

== Royal Institute of Technology (KTH) ==
Colour	Program/Faculty
Purple	Architecture
Red Ochre	Bachelors (Haninge, Södertälje, Kista) with different coloured seams for each program
Cerise	Computer science and engineering
Yellow	Chemical Engineering / Biotechnology
Brown	Industrial Engineering
Orange	Applied Physics / Applied Mathematics
White	Electrical Engineering
Pretty Red	Open Entrance
Bottle Green	Civil Engineering (previously used by the shipbuilding program)
Light Blue	Medical Engineering
Silicon Blue	Information Technology (No longer in use; Kista)
Black with Red tie-dye	MSc Engineering and Teaching
Deep Cyan	Energy and Environment
Dress coat	Vehicle Engineering, Mechanical Engineering, Media Technology, and Design and Product Development (the faculty colour is not used, instead the logo of the relevant faculty is printed (or sewn as a patch) on the back and arm of the coat). Material design uses a grey dress coat.
Violet	ICT & Information Technology
Lime Green	MSc in Microelectronics (No longer in use; Kista)

== Linköping University ==
=== Universitetet ===
Colour	Program/Faculty
Blue	Exchange student, all programs and faculties

=== Linköping Institute of Technology ===
Colour	Seam Colour	Program/Faculty
Brown	Yellow	MSc in Computer Science and Engineering
Brown	Pink	MSc in Information Technology
Brown	Marine Blue	MSc in Computer Science and Software Engineering
Brown	Lime Green	Innovative Programming (bachelors)
Green	White, Yellow	MSc in Biotechnology
Green	White, Yellow, Wine Red	MSc in Checmical Biology
Yellow	Green	MSc in Industrial Engineering
Yellow	Green and Blue/White/Red	MSc in International Industrial Engineering with French orientation
Yellow	Green and Black/Red/Yellow	MSc in International Industrial Engineering with German orientation
Yellow	Green and Red/Yellow/Red	MSc in International Industrial Engineering with Spanish orientation
Yellow	Green and White with Red circles	MSc in International Industrial Engineering with Japanese orientation
Yellow	Green and Red with Yellow stars	MSc in International Industrial Engineering with Chinese orientation
Marine Blue	Yellow	Computer Science (bachelors and masters) (Old)
Lime Green	Yellow	Innovative Programming (bachelors) (Old)
Purple	Yellow	Bachelors (Linköping)
Black	Yellow	MSc. in Applied Physics and Electrotechnology
Black	Yellow and Green	MSc in Medical Engineering
Black	Yellow and Blue/White/Red	MSc. in Applied Physics and Electrotechnology with French orientation
Black	Yellow and Black/Red/Yellow	MSc. in Applied Physics and Electrotechnology with German orientation
Black	Yellow and Red/Yellow/Red	MSc. in Applied Physics and Electrotechnology with Spanish orientation
Black	Yellow and White with Red circles	MSc. in Applied Physics and Electrotechnology with Japanese orientation
Black	Yellow and Red with stars	MSc. in Applied Physics and Electrotechnology with Chinese orientation
Red or Two-piece Red and Yellow	Yellow or Yellow and Red	MSc Mechanical Engineer
Red	Yellow and Orange	Male bachelor in Design and Product Development
Two-piece Red and Yellow	Yellow and Orange/Red and Orange respectively	Female bachelor in Design and Product Development
Red	Yellow and Green	Male MSc in Energy and Environment Management
Two-piece Red and Yellow	Yellow and Green/Red and Green respectively	Female MSc in Energy and Environment Management
Red	Yellow and Blue	Male MSc in Aeronautical Engineering
Two-piece Red and Yellow	Yellow and Blue/Red and Blue respectively	Female MSc in Aeronautical Engineering
Wine Red	Light Blue	Mathematics (Bachelors and Masters)
Wine Red	Green	Biology (Bachelors and Masters)
Wine Red	Black	Chemistry (Bachelors and Masters)
Wine Red	Blue	Physics (Bachelors and Masters)
Bottle Green dungarees	Gold	Graphic Design and Communication
Grey	Yellow	Bachelor (Norrköping)
Orange	Yellow and Black	MSc in Media Technology
Blue	Yellow and Black	MSc in Communication and Transportation
Khaki	Yellow and Black	MSc in Electronics Design

=== Faculty of Arts ===
Colour	Seam Colour	Program/Faculty
Turquoise	Blue and White	Masters of Computer Science
Yellowy Orange dungarees	Purple and Gold	Social Worker program
Yellow	Blue	Business Law
White	Blue/White/Red	Economics (International students wear a German/French/Spanish armband on their left arm)
White	Red, Yellow, Green	Human Resources
Green	Retroreflector	Cognitive Science
Blue	Pink	Politics bachelor/master
White	Purple, Black	Religious Studies (bachelor)
Black	Red	Statistics & Data Analysis
Black jacket		SeKeL
Green	Light Green	Psychology
Blue	Green	Environmental Science
Orange	Red	Social and Cultural Analysis
Lime Green/Black dungarees	Black	Department of Handicrafts and Design
White dungarees	Gold	Tourism Programme - Cultural Heritage and Natural Environment

=== Education ===
Colour	Seam Colour	Program/Faculty
Red	Black	Lärarprogrammet

=== Health Department ===
Colour	Program/Faculty
White labcoat over green scrubs	Doctor
Wine Red dungarees	Occupational Therapist
Olive Green dungarees	Biomedicine
Dark Blue dungarees with Silver seams	Physiotherapist
Purple dungarees	Nurse
Red dungarees	Speech Therapist
Turquoise dungarees	Biomedical Analyst

== Linnaeus University ==
=== Kalmar ===
Colour	Program/Faculty
Grey	Lambda (Seafaring students)
Red	SPIIK (Engineering students)
White	CNaS (Science students)
Yellow	KAROLIN (Teacher students)
Purple/Indigo	Kalmar ESS (Economy students)
Blue	Humanus (Social workers, nurse & sport students)
Black	IDéHuS
Green	ESN Kalmar (Erasmus Student Network, Exchange students)
Turquoise	Meskalin (Journalist & media students)

=== Växjö ===
Colour	Program/Faculty
Purple with coloured seams	VÄXT
Dark Pink (Raspberry Pink)	SAMVETE
Orange	PEDAL
White	WÄDUR
Yellow	PAX
Red	SMISK
Light Blue	KomMedia (disbanded)
Black	EHVS
Green	EHVS
Purple	EHVS - SexIE
Pink	EHVS - EBD
Turquoise	EHVS
Burgundy	VISKA
Lavender	KLUBB
Light Blue	ESN Växjö (previously called VIS)

== Luleå University of Technology ==
Colour		Program/Faculty
Yellow body	Yellow arms	Computer Engineering
Yellow Body	Black arms	Media
Yellow body	Purple arms	Electrical Engineering
Orange body	Orange arms	Applied Physics
Orange body	Purple arms	Applied Physics and Electrical Engineering
Black body	Black arms	Space Engineering
Wine Red body	Wine Red arms	Master of Mechanical Engineering
Wine Red body	Green arms	MSc/Bachelor of Industrial Design
Wine Red body	Blue arms with Yellow stars	EEIGM (International Engineering)
Wine Red body	Black arms	Bachelor of Automotive Engineering
Wine Red body	Checkered arms	MSc Sustainable Energy Technology
Wine Red body	White arms	Technical foundation year
Black body	White arms	Computer Game Development
Grey body	White arms	Graphic Design
Wine Red body	White arms	Foundation year
Red body	White arms	Characteristics Maker and Senography
Purple body	White arms	Entrepreneur
Yellow body	White arms	Process Operator
Green body	White arms	Computer Networks
Pink body	White arms	Nurse
Blue body	White arms	Social Work
Orange body	White arms	Bachelor in Mechanical Engineering

== Faculty of Engineering (LTH), Lund University ==
Colour	Program/Faculty
Orange	Engineering Physics, Engineering Mathematics, Nanoscience, Photonics
White	Electrical Engineering, Biomedical Engineering
Red	Mechanical Engineering
Blue	Civil Construction
Purple	Architecture
Yellow	Chemical Engineering, Biotechnology
Pink	Computer Science and Engineering (previously brown), Information and Communication Technology and Engineering
Black	Fire Protection
Green	Surveying
Marine Blue	Bachelor's programme in Engineering (Computer Science, Electrical Engineering, Civil Engineering)
Turkos	Environmental Engineering
Wine Red	Industrial Engineering

== Malmö University ==
Colour	Faculty
Red	Faculty of Health and Society HS
Blue	Faculty of Culture and Society KS (Urban Studies, Global Political Studies, School of Arts and Communication K3)
Yellow	Faculty of Education and Society LS
Green	Faculty of Technology and Society TS
White	Odontological Faculty OD

== University of Skövde ==
Colour	Program/Faculty
Orange	Academic Gaming Environment Skövde "AGES"
Neon Yellow	Computer Science / DHISK (obsolete)
Purple	Humanities / SkHum (obsolete)
Light Green	Biomedicine/Vitae
Dark Grey	Game Development / SKILLS
White	Engineering/BeEkIng
Dark Blue	Behavioural Sciences/BeEkIng
Light Blue	Economics/SköEkon/BeEkIng
Turquoise	Nursing
Black	Sexmästeriet
Wine red	Sexmästeriet - Board
Wine red	Languages (obsolete)
White Waistcoat	S.O.S. - Skövdes Organiserade Sällskapsresande

== Stockholms universitet ==
Colour	Program/Faculty
Black with Gold leg seams	DISKs Klubbmästeri
White body Bottle Green arms and legs	Science Association's Klubbmästeri
White	Economy Association
Yellow	Stockholms University's student union
Purple	Teaching program's Klubbmästeri

== Umeå University ==
Colour	Program/Faculty
Orange	Bachelor in Civil Engineering
White	Bachelor in Computer Engineering
Wine Red	Bachelor in Energy Engineering
Red	Bachelor in Energy Engineering (obsolete)
Grey with Green leg seams	Bachelor in Mechanical Engineering
Black	MsC in Engineering Physics
Light Blue	MSc in computing science (a Red jacket is worn by people in the program's party association, Piraya)
Light Blue with Purple leg seams	Computer Science
Turquoise	Environmental health
Khaki	Master in Interaction and Design
Blue	Biology and Earth Science
Dark Blue	MSc in Energy Engineering and Master of Social Sciences program
Green	Molecular Biology and Chemistry (Life Science)
Dark Green	MSc in Biotechnology and Genomics (formerly Engineering Biology)
Light Purple	MSc in Industrial Chemistry (formerly Technical Science Chemistry)
Pink	Used by HHUS association during special events

== Örebro University ==
Colour	Program/Faculty
Yellow	SERUM
Purple	TekNat
Red	Corax (obsolete)
Black	SOBRA
Dark Blue	Sesam
Orange	GIH
Pink	Qultura
Wine Red	Grythyttan
Light Blue	ESN
