= Kuhlohorn =

Rotary valve flugelhorn by Johannes Kuhlo

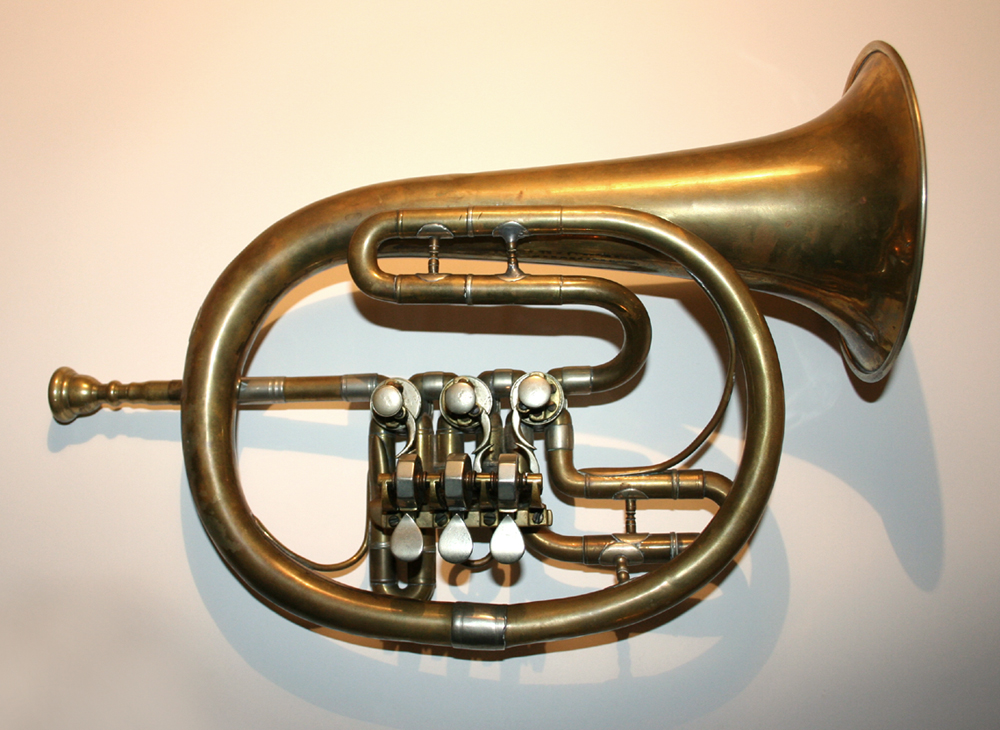
Kuhlo-Flügelhorn (Kuhlohorn)

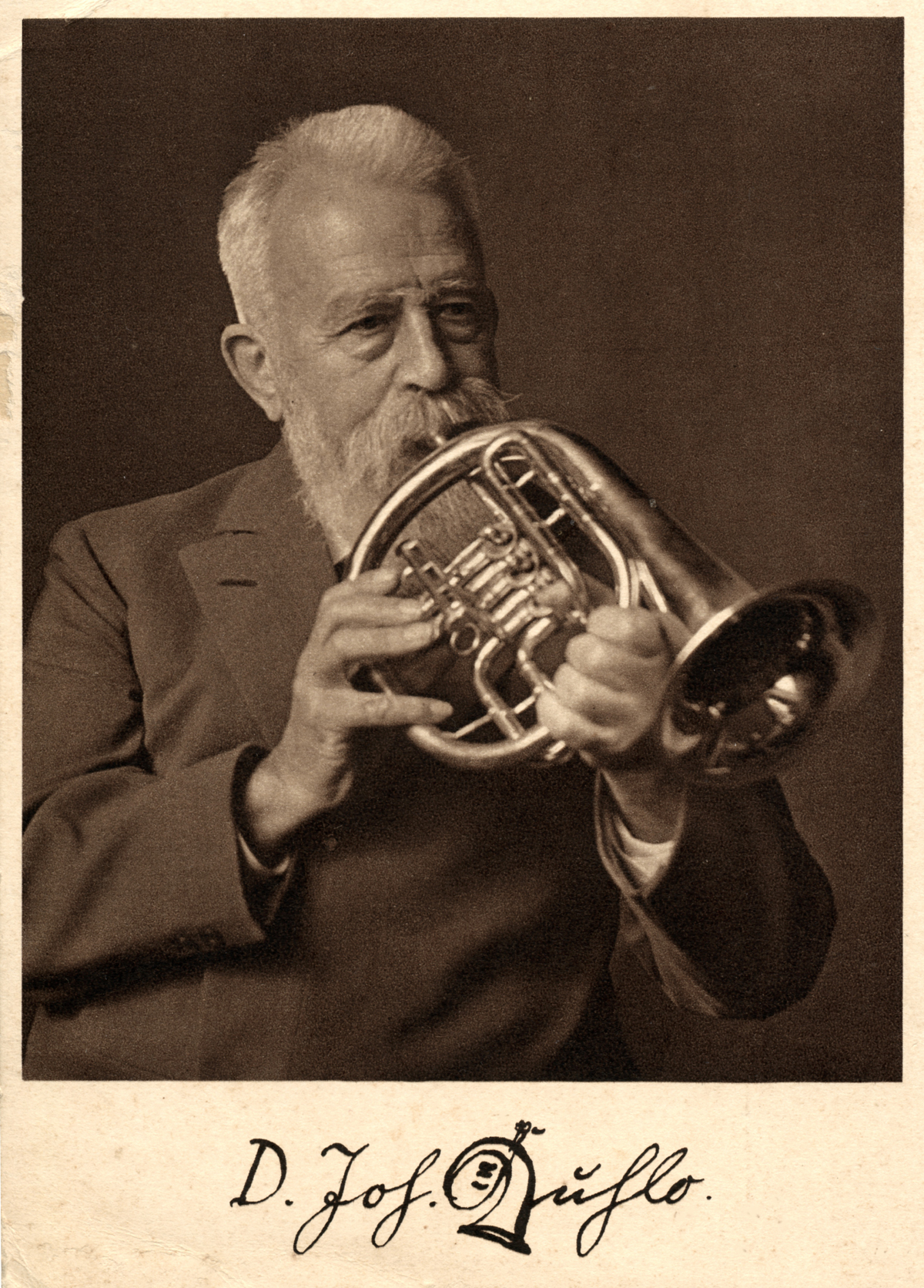
Johannes Kuhlo playing a Kuhlohorn crafted by Ernst David

The Kuhlohorn (also Kuhlo-Flügelhorn) is a small flugelhorn in B♭. This is a specially designed brass wind-instrument played using a deep bowled mouth piece. Chief characteristics are its oval design and integrated, usually conical tubing. Kuhlohorns commonly are featuring a conical tuning slide, at the second curved pipe section after the rotary valves.

Johannes Kuhlo found the unique sound ideal for a cappella brass choir (Posaunenchor). He wrote about the Flugelhorn: "They come closest to the human voice after the trombone, because of their soft, full, melodic tone. Since they present fewer difficulties (in playing) than the trombones, these Flugelhorns are the most indispensable for us ... and the more similar an instrument sounds to the human voice, the more perfect it is and to be rated even higher. The flugelhorns (mostly in B♭) belong to the horns, they are the nightingales in the soprano of brass music".

He therefore preferred and recommended these special instruments (horns, tubas) instead of traditional trumpets. The first of these instruments were developed in collaboration with the Bielefelder instruments maker, Ernst David in the years between 1893 and 1908.
