= Ernst David (musical instrument maker) =

Ernst David (1864 – c. 1918) was a German musical instrument maker in the city of Bielefeld, Germany.

By the time David was twenty (in 1885), it is believed he was already doing business under his own name. By 1888 he was making musical instruments. By 1904 his business had grown to become a small instrument factory. After his death the factory kept the name of Ernst David, but was owned by his son Albert David.

The instrument company specialized in making brass instruments, many of which were used by Posaunen (brass horns) choirs in Protestant congregations in Germany and beyond. Johannes Kuhlo collaborated with Ernst David to develop the Kuhlohorn for use by Posaunen choirs. Some Ernst David instruments are still in regular use. Several examples can be found in musical instrument collections.

Presently it is not clear when the instrument factory stopped operating; most likely it was during World War II.

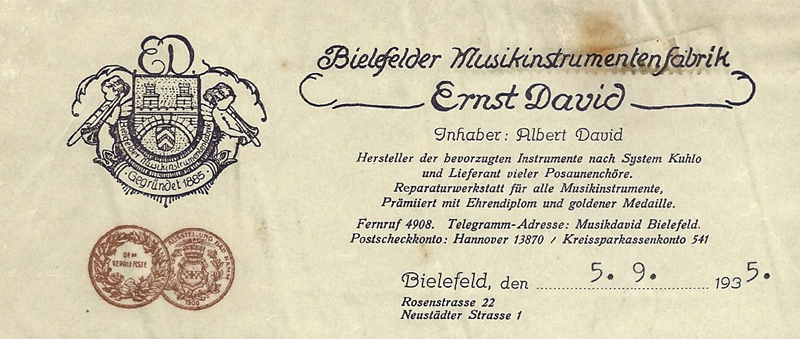
Business Letter, Instrumentmaker Ernst David, Bielefeld (Germany), 1935

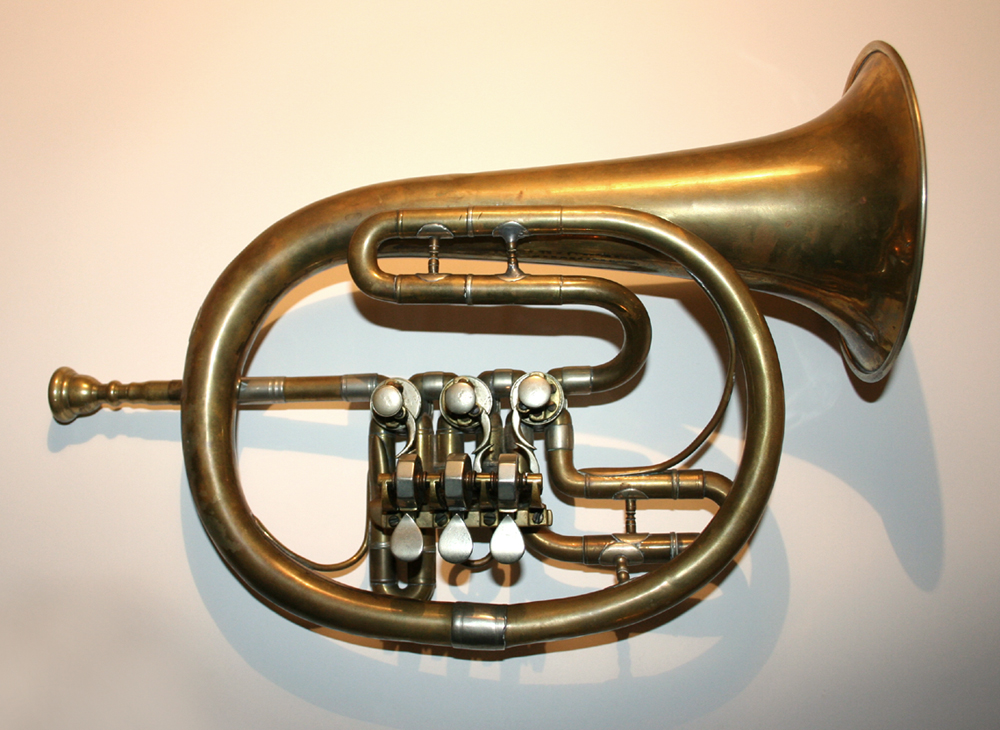
Kuhlo-Flügelhorn (Kuhlohorn)

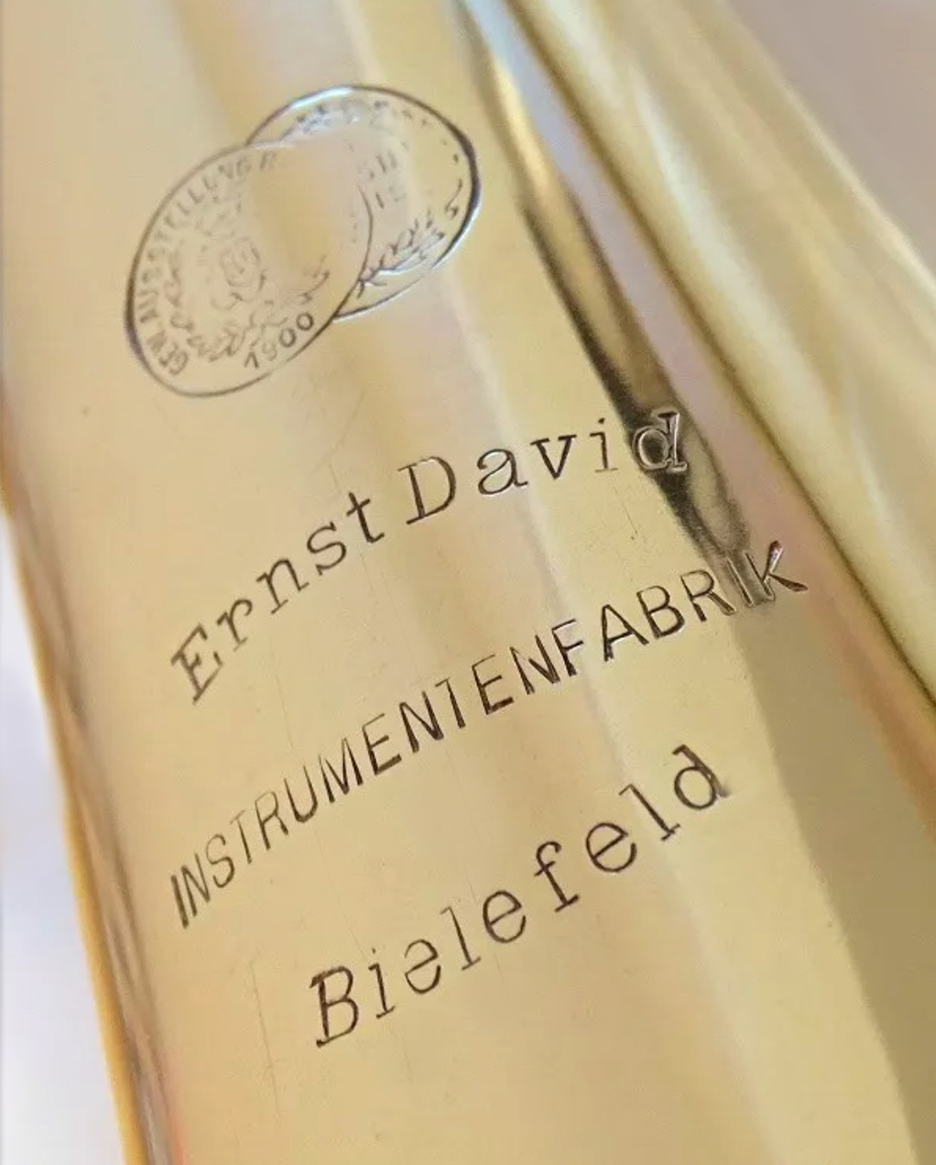
Gravure Ernst David

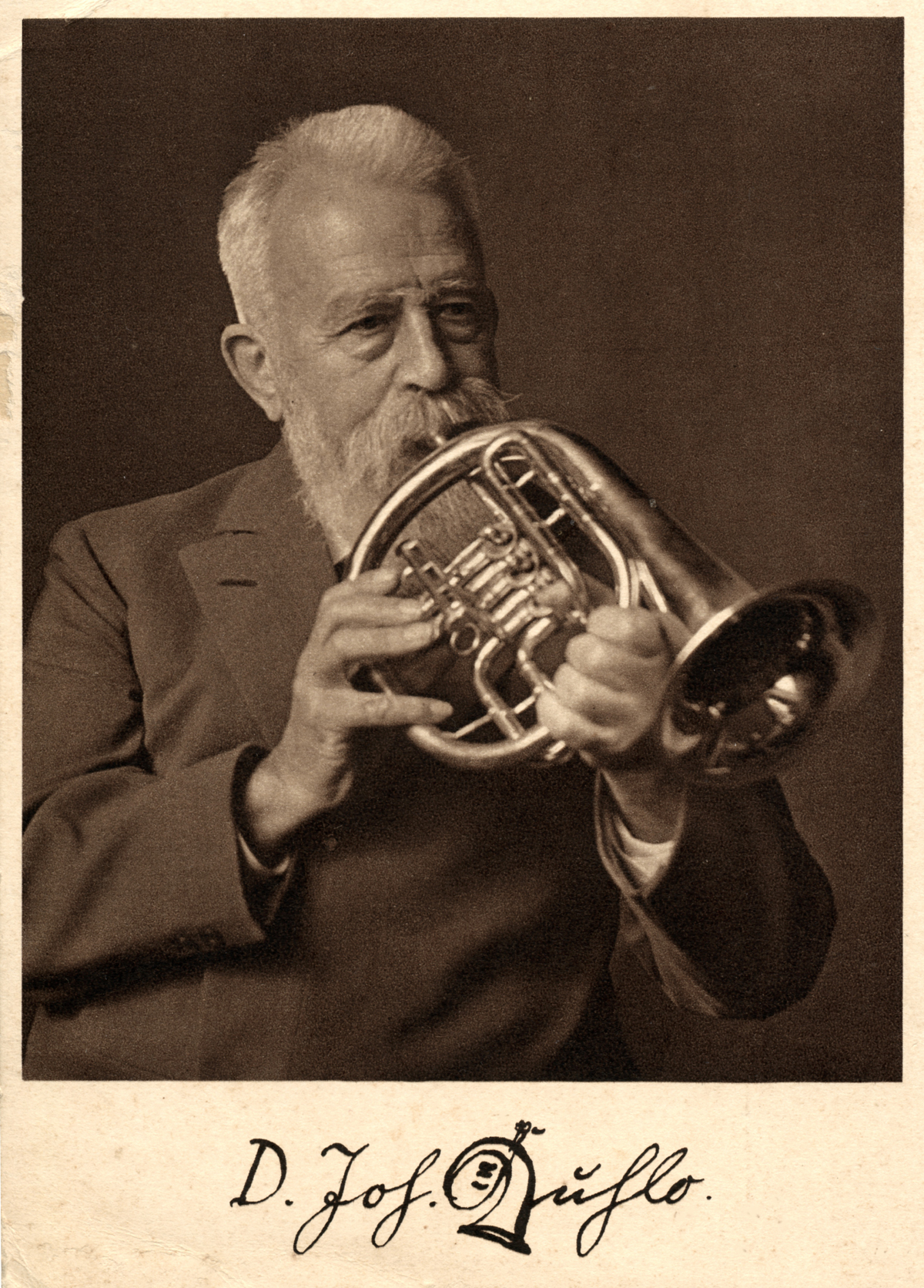
Johannes Kuhlo playing a Kuhlohorn crafted by Ernst David
