= Couleur =

European student headgear and decorations

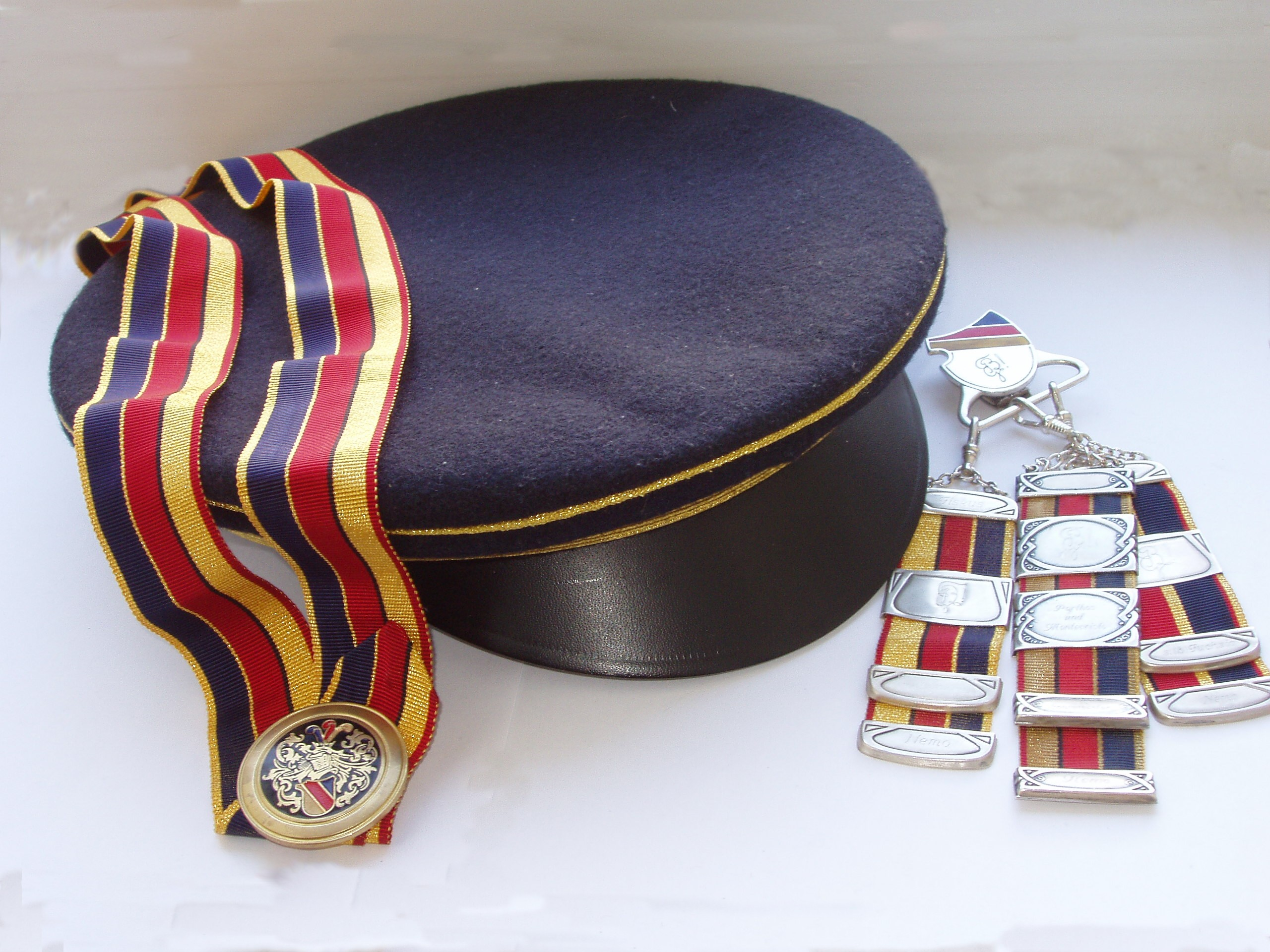
Ribbon, cap and Zipfel of an Austrian Studentenverbindung

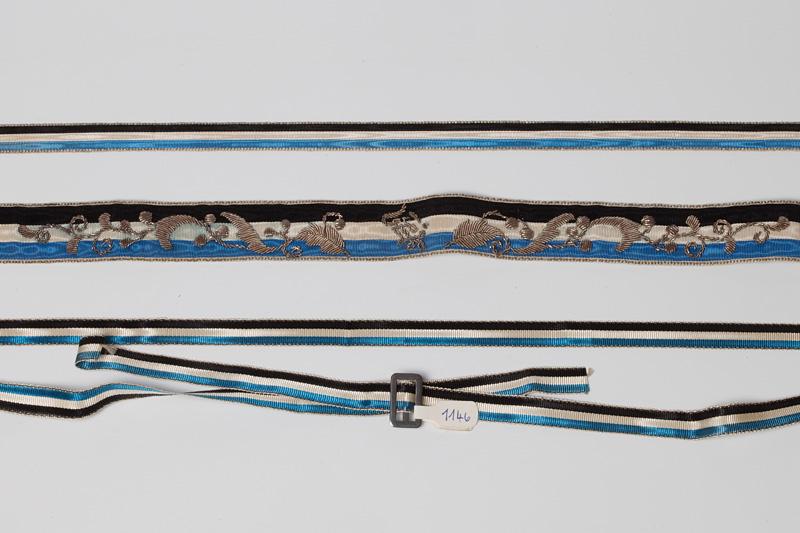
Couleur bands of the Zionist Verbindung Nehardea from Basel, in the Jewish Museum of Switzerland's collection.

Couleur (from French, meaning 'colour' in English) is the expression used in Central European Studentenverbindungen for the various headgear and distinctive ribbons worn by members of these student societies.

There are three classes of such student societies:

- Societies with no colours (so called schwarz, 'black')
- Societies with colours but wearing no ribbon, no cap etc. They wear their colours e.g. in their coat of arms or as Zipfel.
- Societies with colours and wearing a ribbon, a cap etc.

== Ribbon ==
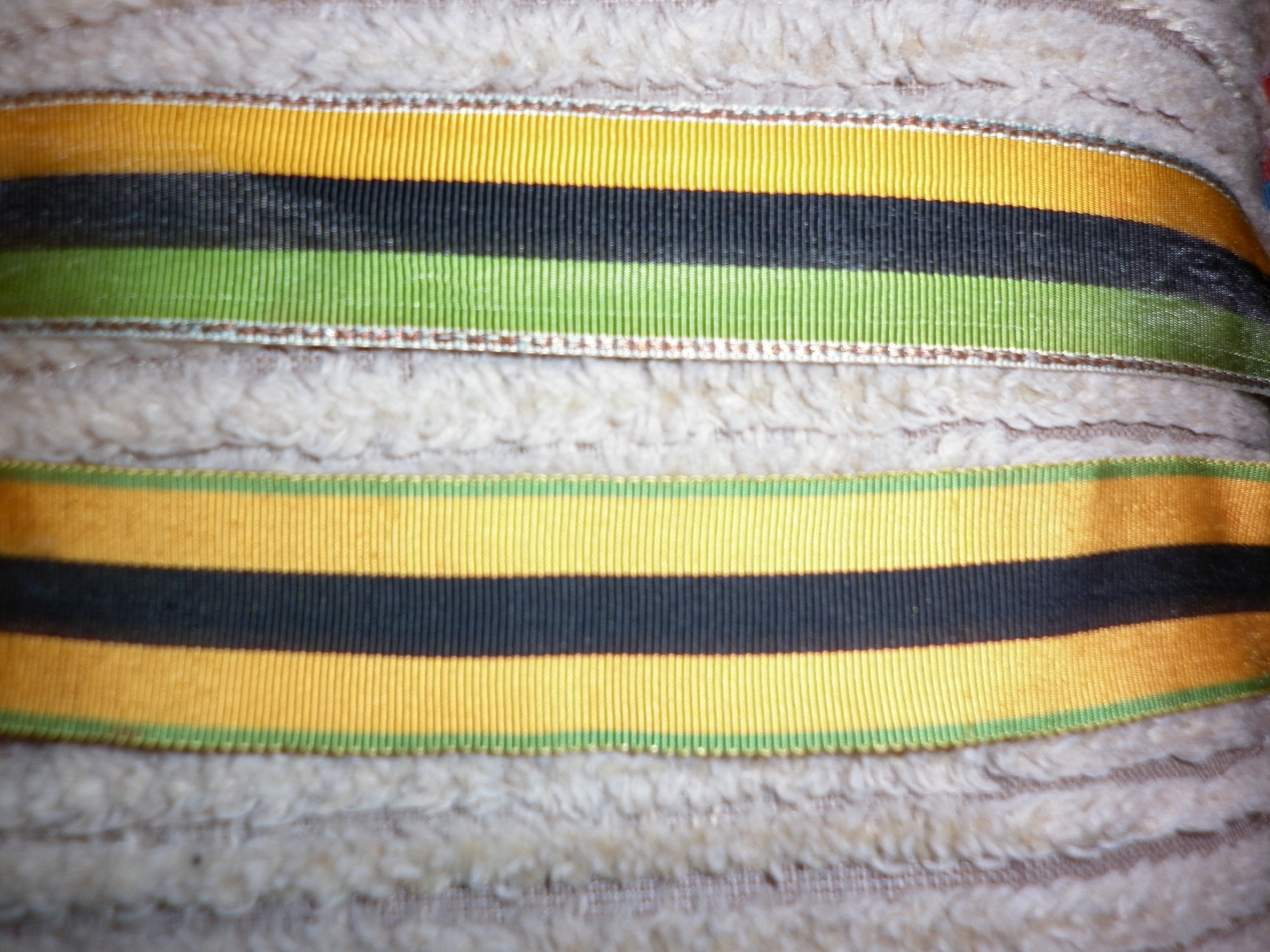
Example of a pair of ribbons from the same society, Bursche upper, Fux lower.

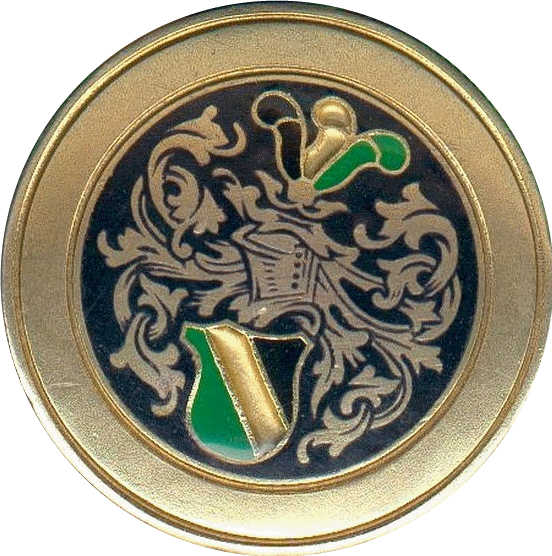
Button of metal with colours.

The ribbon (so called Band) is worn over the right shoulder to the left hip. Both ends are held together by a button, often fashioned from metal or porcelain. These buttons are often engraved or enameled with a Zirkel (monogram or logo) and at times even specific coat of arms associated with the student society in question. A lot of societies distinguish two types of ribbons. One is used by the new members (so called Fux or Fuchs, after the German 'fox', or schacht in Flanders, a word borrowed from the military, where it meant 'new recruit'), the other one is used by the elder members (so called Bursche or, if with degree, Alter Herr; in Flanders elders members are ouderejaars). The ribbons of the elder members show the original or full colours of the society, where the ribbons of the new members often show a variation of them, such as displaying only two of the three main colours. In the Flemish tradition new members wear the full colours, but on the left shoulder, instead of the right.

== Headgear ==
=== Cap ===
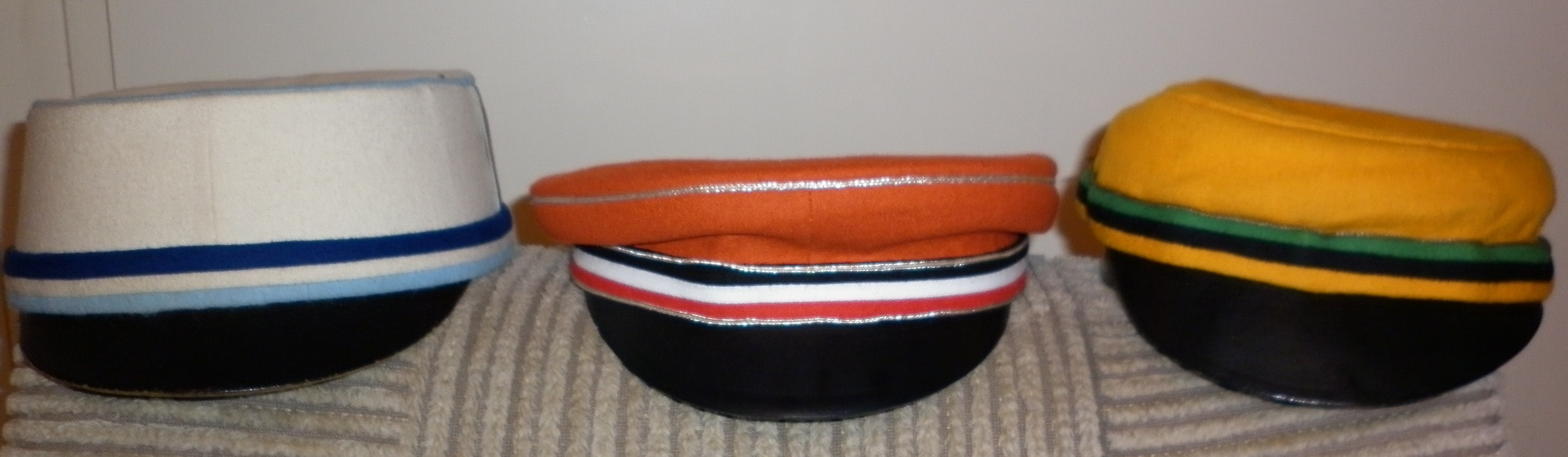
Collection of caps, from left to right: Biedermeierformat, Tellermütze, Biedermeierformat

Mostly a cap (so called Mütze) consists of:

- a black bill,
- a crown coloured by one of the colours of the ribbon,
- a band with the colours of the ribbon.

There are various forms of caps, e.g.:

- Biedermeierformat
- Tellermütze
- Stürmer

=== Stürmer ===
A special and seldom seen form of headgear is the Stürmer (English 'hotspur'). It has a black bill, a black band and the top of the crown points to the front. The crown is also coloured by one of the colours of the ribbon. Sometimes a Zirkel is embroidered on the top. Traditionally, the Stürmer is worn only in the summer semester of the academic year.

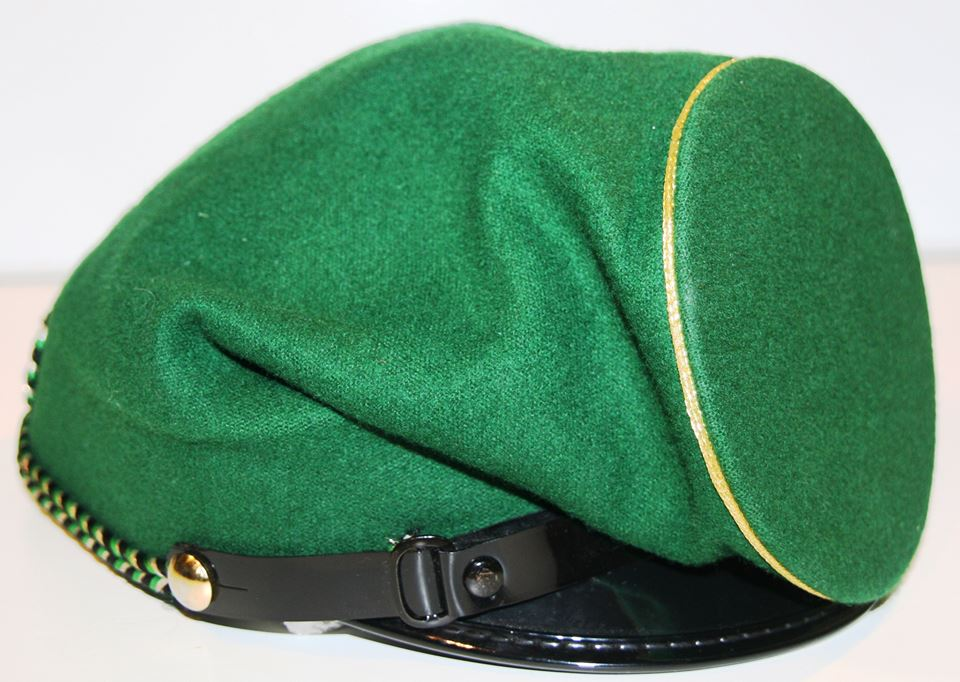
The traditional Stürmer, one of the two contemporary hat Couleur of Corps Hubertia Freiburg

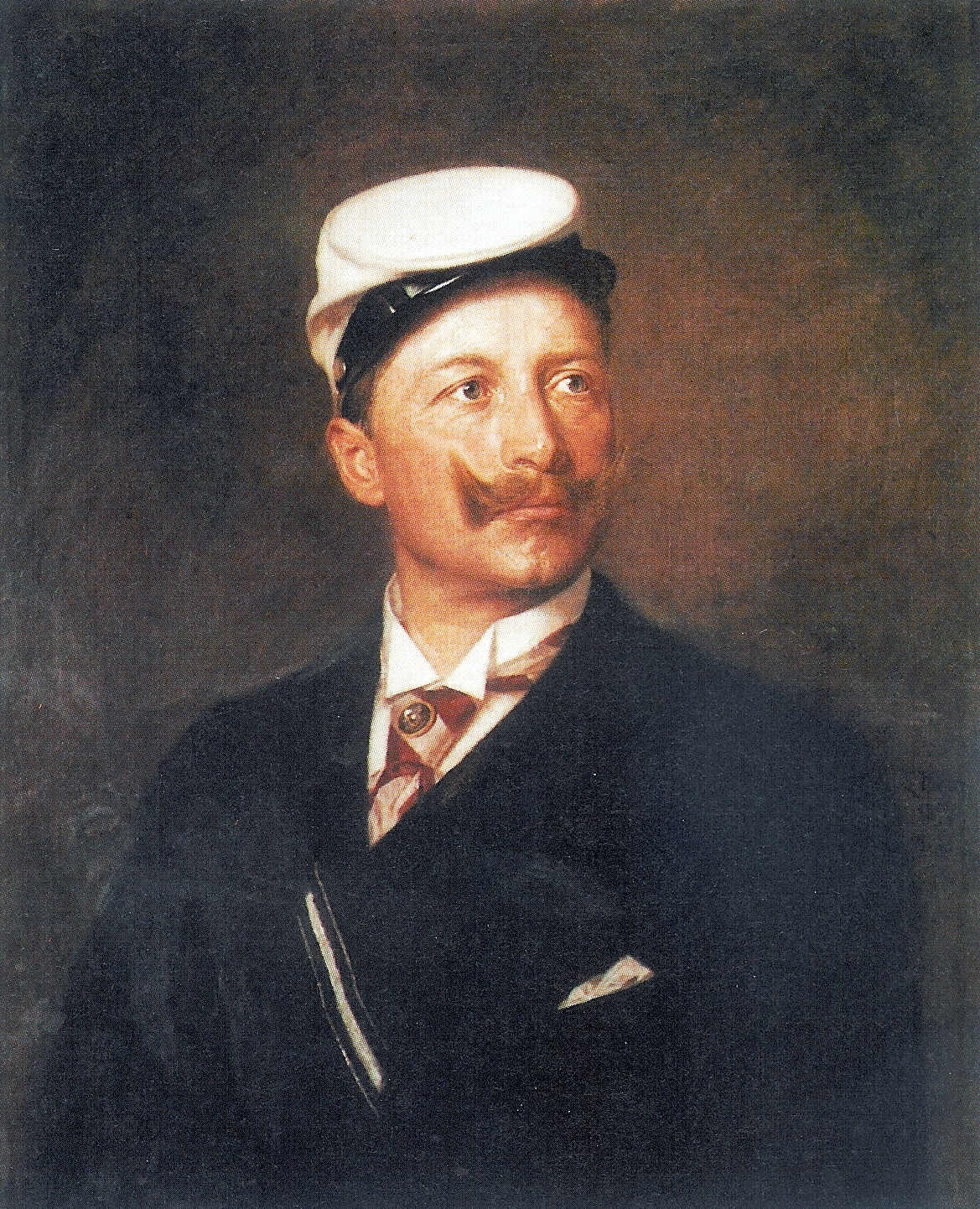
German Emperor Wilhelm II. wearing the Couleur of Corps Borussia Bonn with a white Stürmer and a black-white-black ribbon

=== Tönnchen ===
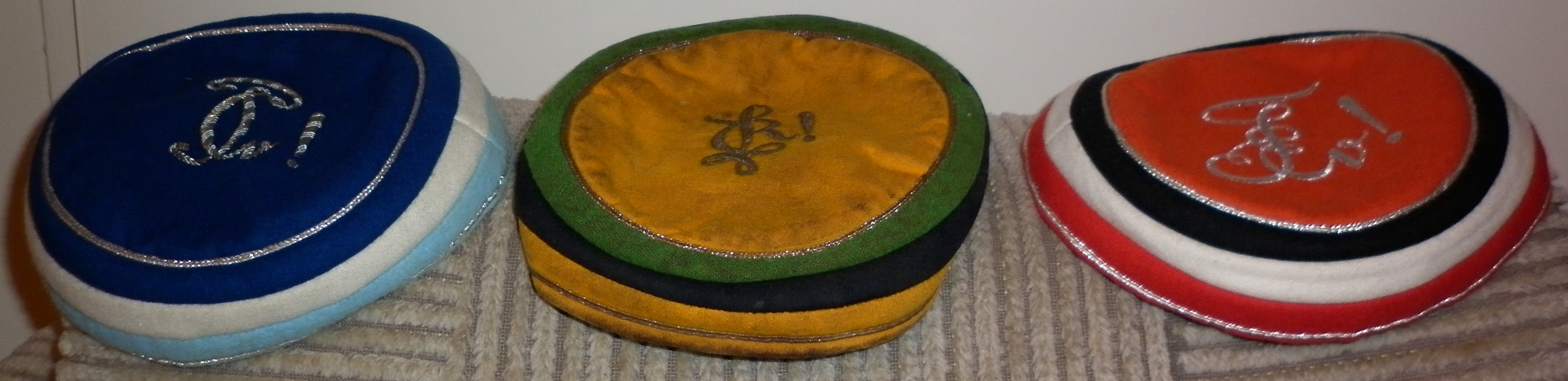
Collection of Tönnchen with Zirkel on the top of the crown

A Tönnchen (diminutive of Tonne, English 'barrel') is a headgear with:
- a flat crown, the top coloured by one of the colours of the ribbon and mostly embroidered with the Zirkel,
- straight upright sides with the colours of the ribbon,
- Tönnchen are worn instead of caps by the elder members on official occasions.

=== Straßencerevis ===
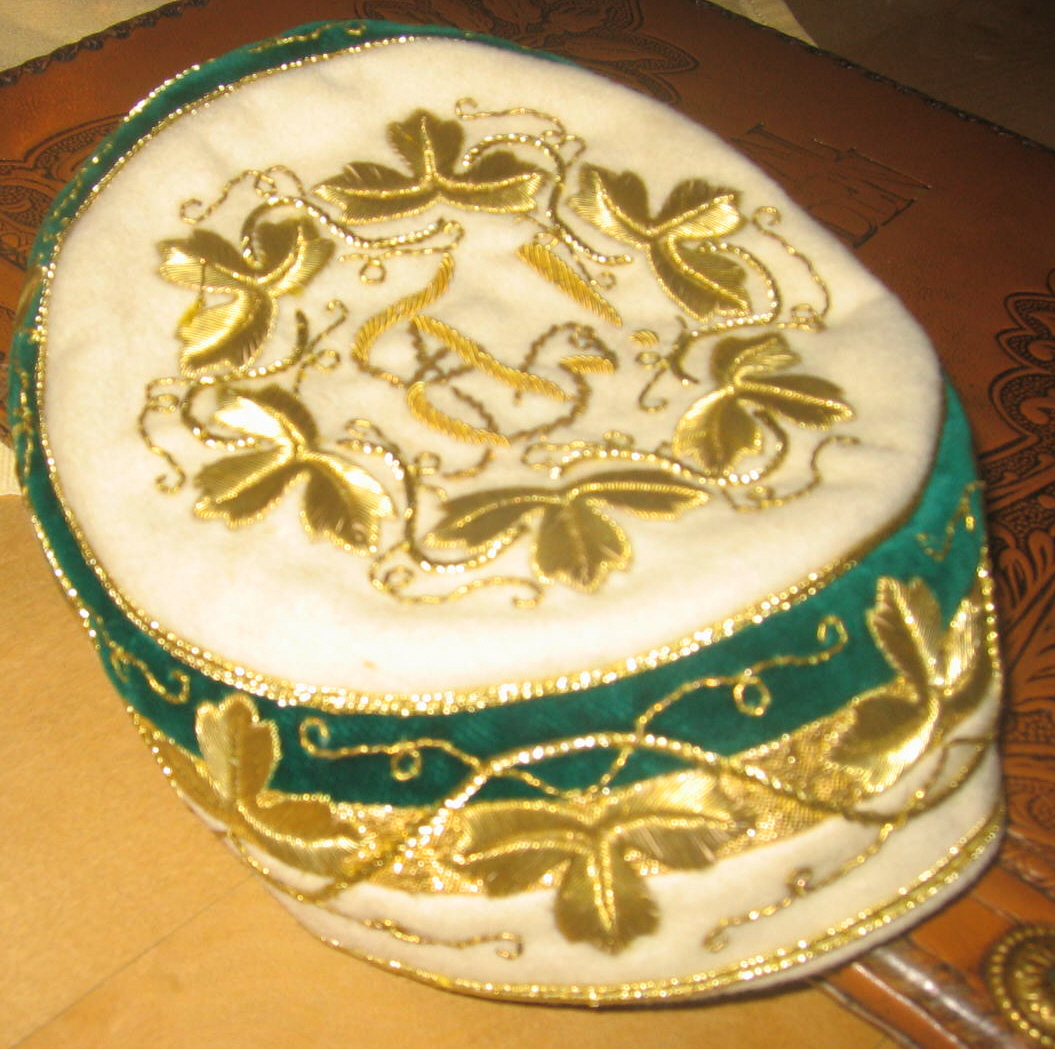
Straßencerevis with vine leaves

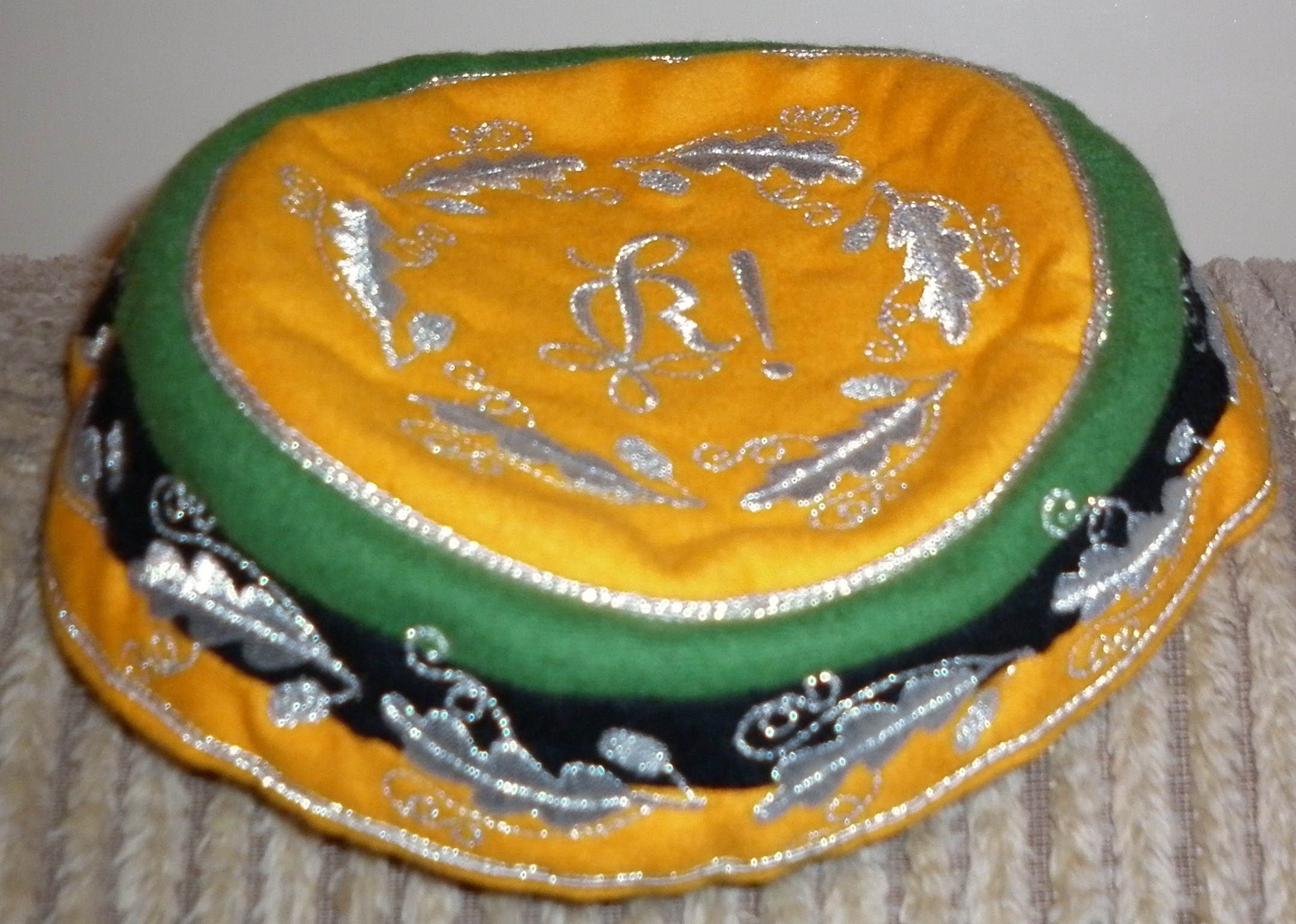
Straßencerevis with oak leaves

A Straßencerevis looks like a Tönnchen but is embroidered with a Zirkel and oak leaves or vine leaves.

== See also ==
- List of student boilersuit colours
