= Mole =

Mole (or Molé) may refer to:

== Animals ==
- Mole (animal)
- "True moles" of the family Talpidie
- Golden mole, southern African mammals
- Marsupial mole, Australian mammals
- Mole-rat

== Other common meanings ==
- Nevus, a growth on human skin
  - Melanocytic nevus, a specific type of mole
- Mole (architecture), a structure separating bodies of water
- Mole (espionage), a spy in an organisation
- Mole (sauce), a traditional Mexican food which can be a sauce or marinade
- An abnormal mass within the uterus; see molar pregnancy

== Arts and entertainment ==
- Mole, in the novel The Wind in the Willows by Kenneth Grahame
- Mole (Zdeněk Miler character)
- The Mole, in Happy Tree Friends
- The Mole, a criminal in Dick Tracy comic strips
- El Topo (The Mole), a 1970 film
- De Mol (TV series)
- "The Mole", a song by Harry James
- Mole (video game), a 2026 psychological horror game

== Science and technology ==
- Mole (unit), the SI unit for the amount of substance
- Tunnel boring machine
- Heat Flow and Physical Properties Package, a burrowing probe sent to Mars

== People ==
- Mole (surname)
- Molé, a French surname

== Places ==
=== Australia ===
- Mole River (New South Wales)
- Mole Creek (Tasmania)

=== England ===
- River Mole, Surrey
- River Mole, Devon

=== France ===
- La Môle, a commune, Var Département
- Le Môle, an Alp mountain

=== Ghana ===
- Mole National Park

=== India ===
- Mole, Karnataka, a village

=== Myanmar ===
- Mole, Shwegu, a village

== Other uses ==
- "Mole", NATO term for the Soviet aircraft Beriev Be-8
- Cultivator No. 6, WWII trench-digger, nickname
- Mole-Richardson or Mole, lighting company
- Moll (slang), or mole

== See also ==
- Mole wrench
- Mol (disambiguation)
- The Mole (disambiguation)
- Moles (disambiguation)
- Moll (disambiguation)
