= Moll (surname) =

Moll is a surname. Notable people with the surname include:

- Albert Moll (German psychiatrist), (1862–1939), founder of modern sexology
- Albert Moll (Canadian psychiatrist), pioneer in day treatment for psychiatric patients
- Brian Moll (1925–2013), British-born Australian actor
- Carl Moll (1861–1945), Austrian painter
- Claudia Moll (born 1968), German politician
- Eva Moll (born 1975), German visual artist
- Friedrich Rudolf Heinrich Carl Moll (1882–1951), German wood-preservation specialist
- Gerrit Moll (1785–1838), Dutch scientist and mathematician
- Giorgia Moll (born 1938), Italian retired film actress
- Guy Moll (1910–1934), French auto racer
- Herman Moll (1654?–1732), British cartographer
- Herman Moll (convict), Australian historical figure
- Jacob Anton Moll, Dutch oculist and namesake for the gland of Moll
- John Selwyn Moll (1913–1942), English banker and rugby union player
- John L. Moll, (1921 – 2011) was an American electrical engineer, notable for his contributions to solid-state physics.
- Joseph Moll (1813–1849), German labour leader and revolutionary, an early associate of Karl Marx
- Jürgen Moll, German footballer
- Kurt Moll (1938–2017), German operatic bass singer
- Louis-Joseph Moll, physician and MLA for Quebec
- Oskar Moll (1875–1947), German painter, husband of Marg Moll
- Otto Moll (1915–1946), German SS-Hauptscharführer at Auschwitz Concentration Camp executed for war crimes
- Marg Moll (1884–1977), German sculptor, painter and author, wife of Oskar Moll
- Richard Moll (1943–2023), American actor
- Sam Moll (born 1992), American baseball player
- Toby Moll (1890–1916), South African rugby union player
- Toby Moll (general) (1917–1967), South African major-general and Chief of Defence Staff
- Tony Moll, American football player
- Victor Hugo Moll (born 1956), American mathematician
- William Edmund Moll (1856–1932), English Anglican priest and christian socialist

== See also ==
- King Æthelwald Moll of Northumbria
