= Moll =

Moll may refer to:

== Media ==
- Moll Flanders, a 1722 novel by Daniel Defoe

=== Characters ===
- Moll, a young prostitute in the 1937 musical The Cradle Will Rock
- Moll, an outlaw in the fifth season of the TV series Star Trek: Discovery
- Moll Hackabout, protagonist in William Hogarth's 1730s series of paintings and engravings, A Harlot's Progress

== People ==
=== Given name ===
- Moll Anderson, American interior designer, life stylist, author and former singer
- Moll Anthony (1807–1878), Irish bean feasa
- Æthelwald Moll of Northumbria (fl. 759–765), King of Northumbria
- Moll Davis (c. 1648 – 1708), a courtesan and mistress of King Charles II of England
- Moll Dyer (died c. 1697), a legendary 17th-century resident of Leonardtown, Maryland
- Mary Frith (also Moll Cutpurse; (c. 1584 – 1659), notorious English pickpocket and fence
- Moll King (coffee house proprietor) (1696–1747), a prominent figure in London's underworld
- Moll O'Driscoll (1922–1988), Irish Gaelic footballer
- Moll Pitcher (c. 1736 – 1813), a clairvoyant and fortune-teller from Lynn, Massachusetts

=== Surname ===
- Albert Moll (Canadian psychiatrist), pioneer of day treatment for psychiatric patients
- Brian Moll (1925–2013), British-born Australian comedian character actor of stage, television and film
- Carl Moll (1861–1945), Austrian art nouveau painter
- Gerrit Moll (1785–1838), Dutch scientist and mathematician
- Giorgia Moll (born 1938), Italian film actress
- Guy Moll (1910–1934), French racing driver
- Herman Moll (mid-17th century–1732), British cartographer, engraver and publisher
- John Selwyn Moll (1913–1942), English banker, British Army officer and rugby union player
- Louis-Joseph Moll (1816–1872), Canadian physician and political figure in Quebec
- Toby Moll (1890–1916), South African rugby union player
- Toby Moll (general) (born 1917), South African Chief of Defence Staff
- W. E. Moll (1856–1932), English Anglican priest and Christian socialist activist
- Arthur Moll (1921–2024), Swiss military officer

==== Americans ====
- Billy Moll, (1904–1968), American lyricist and songwriter
- John L. Moll, (1921–2011), American electrical engineer
- Richard Moll (1943–2023), American actor
- Sam Moll (born 1992), American professional baseball pitcher
- Tony Moll (born 1983), American football guard and offensive tackle
- Victor Moll (born 1956), Chilean-American mathematician

==== Germans ====
- Albert Moll (German psychiatrist) (1862–1939), a neurologist, psychologist, sexologist, and ethicist
- Claudia Moll (born 1968), German politician
- Eva Moll (born 1975), German contemporary artist
- Friedrich Moll (1882–1951), German wood specialist
- Herman Moll (convict), (1838–1882), German convict in England transported to Western Australia
- Joseph Moll (1813–1849), German labour leader and revolutionary
- Jürgen Moll (1939–1968), German football player
- Kurt Moll (1938–2017), German operatic bass singer
- Marg Moll (1884–1977), German sculptor, painter and author
- Oskar Moll (1875–1947), German Fauvist painter
- Otto Moll (1915–1946), an SS non-commissioned officer who committed numerous atrocities at Auschwitz

== Other uses ==
- Gun moll, the female companion of a male professional criminal
- Möll, a river in northwestern Carinthia in Austria
- Moll (slang), a usually pejorative or self-deprecating term for a woman of loose sexual morals
- Moll, Skye, a location in Highland, Scotland

== See also ==
- Moll's Gap, a mountain pass in County Kerry, Ireland
- Moll's gland, a modified apocrine sweat gland on the margin of the eyelid
- Molly (name), a feminine name sometimes shortened to Moll
- Villa Moll, a town in the province of Buenos Aires, Argentina
- Mol (disambiguation)
