= Mol (surname) =

Mol is a Dutch surname. Meaning "mole" in Dutch, it may be descriptive in origin, or metonymic for a mole catcher. The name could also be patronymic (from the archaic name Molle) or toponymic, referring to the town Mol, Belgium in Antwerp province or a location named "the mole(s)". Among variant forms are De Mol ("the mole"), Demol (a West Flemish variant), Moll, Mols (a patronymic form), and Van Mol ("from the town Mol").

== Mol ==
- Alarda Mol (born 1982), Dutch cricketer
- Albert Mol (1917–2004), Dutch author, actor and TV personality
- Anders Mol (born 1997), Norwegian volleyball player
- Annemarie Mol (born 1958), Dutch ethnographer and philosopher
- Christelle Mol (born 1972), French badminton player
- Dick Mol (born 1955), Dutch paleontologist and mammoth expert
- Geert-Maarten Mol (born 1983), Dutch cricketer, brother of Hendrik-Jan
- Gretchen Mol (born 1972), American model and actress
- Hans Mol (1922–2017), Dutch-born Australian sociologist
- Hendrik-Jan Mol (born 1977), Dutch cricketer, brother of Geert-Maarten
- Jaap Mol (1912–1972), Dutch football forward
- Leo Mol (1915–2009), Ukrainian-Canadian artist and sculptor
- Michael Mol (born 1971), South African doctor and TV personality
- Michiel Mol (born 1969), Dutch businessman and Formula One team director
- Serge Mol (born 1970), Belgian martian arts historian and author
- Simon Mol (1973–2008), pen name of Simon Moleke Njie, Cameroon-born journalist and writer
- Tom Van Mol (born 1972), Belgian footballer
- Wouter Mol (born 1982), Dutch cyclist
- Woutherus Mol (1785–1857), Dutch painter

== De Mol ==
- Christine De Mol (born 1954), Belgian applied mathematician and mathematical physicist
- Joannes de Mol (1726–1782), Dutch minister and porcelain manufacturer
- Joep de Mol (born 1995), Dutch field hockey player
- John de Mol Jr. (born 1955), Dutch media tycoon, brother of Linda
- Johnny de Mol (born 1979), Dutch actor and presenter, son of John Jr.
- Linda de Mol (born 1964), Dutch actress and television presenter, sister of John Jr.
- Ranlequin de Mol (fl. 15th century), Dutch composer
- Willem De Mol (1846–1874), Belgian composer

== Demol ==
- Dirk Demol (born 1959), Belgian cyclist and directeur sportif
- Els Demol (born 1958), Belgian New Flemish Alliance politician
- François Demol (1895–1966), Belgian football defender and manager
- Stéphane Demol (born 1966), Belgian football defender

== Mols ==
- Florent Mols (1811–1896), Belgian painter
- Jonas Mols, Belgian poker player
- Léonie Mols (1843–1918), Belgian philanthropist, daughter of Florent
- Michael Mols (born 1970), Dutch football striker
- Robert Mols (1848–1903), Belgian painter, son of FLorent
- Stefan Mols (born 1999), Spanish football midfielder
- Tonny Mols (born 1969), Belgian football midfielder

Van Mol

- Pieter van Mol (1599–1650), Flemish painter
- Tom Van Mol (born 1972), Belgian footballer

== Other uses ==
- De Mol (TV series), a Belgium reality game show licensed in several international formats, commonly known in English countries as The Mole

== See also ==
- Moll (surname), German and Dutch surname
- Mohl, German surname
- Benjamin Mul (born 1969), Papua New Guinea politician
- Jan Mul (1911–1971), Dutch church music composer
- Tom De Mul (born 1986), Belgian football winger
