= Mrs. Mole =

Mrs. Mole may refer to:

- Mrs. Mole, a character from the episode Little Terrors, from the 1955 British television series Sooty Show
- Mrs. Mole, a character from the 1972 American animated film Santa and the Ice Cream Bunny
- Mrs. Mole, a character from the 1973 American animated television series Super Friends
- Mrs. Mole, a character from the 1986 Japanese anime series Maple Town
- Mrs. Mole, a character from the 1997 British animated television series The Animal Shelf
- Mrs. Mole, a character from the 2004 British animated television series Peppa Pig
- MRS mole, also known as Mr. Rajiv Ranjan, a character from the 2018 Hindi film Genius
- Mrs. Mole, a character from the 2020 all-female adaptation on Audible of the 1908 British children's novel The Wind in the Willows

== See also ==
- Mole
- Moles
