= Newport Healthcare =

United States healthcare organisation

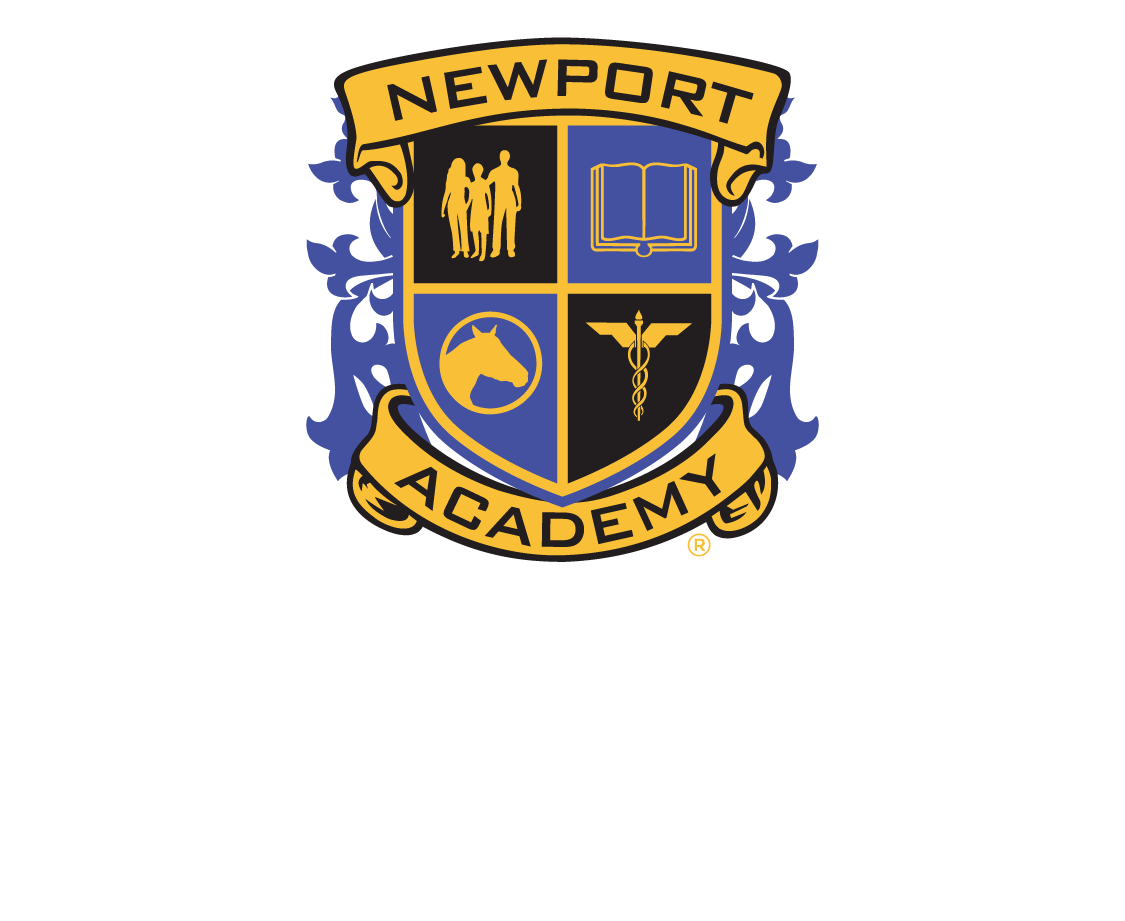
- Founded: 2008
- Founder: Jamison Monroe Jr.
- Type: Behavioral healthcare organization
- Headquarters: Nashville, Tennessee, United States
- Region served: United States
- Services: Residential treatment, outpatient programs (including PHP and IOP)
- Owner: Onex
- Key people: Brian Setzer (CEO)
- Website: https://www.newporthealthcare.com/

Newport Healthcare is a behavioral healthcare organization in the United States. It runs residential treatment centers and outpatient programs for adolescents and young adults through Newport Academy, which serves adolescents, and Newport Institute, which serves young adults. It also operates Center for Families and Prairiecare.

Jamison Monroe Jr. founded Newport Academy in 2008. The private equity frim Onex bought a majority stake in Newport Healthcare in 2021. The company acquired PrairieCare in 2022, and in 2025 it announced layoffs and the closure of several locations.

== History ==
Newport healthcare traces its origins to Newport Academy and Newport Institute, which was founded in 2008 by Jamison Monroe Jr. The first facility, a six-bed residential center for adolescents, was opened in Orange County, California, in 2009. Newport subsequently expanded its operations in Southern California with additional facilities in Costa Mesa and Corona del Mar.

In 2012, Newport received approval from the Commission on Accreditation of Rehabilitation Facilities.

In 2013, Newport opened its first East Coast location in Bethlehem, Connecticut.

By 2016, Newport had opened an additional 20-bed facility in Bethlehem, a therapeutic high school in Manhattan, and an outpatient school in Darien, Connecticut, with plans for centers in Tennessee and Georgia.

In 2017, The Carlyle Group acquired a major stake in Newport. Two years later, in 2019, Newport acquired Gray Wolf Ranch in Jefferson County, Washington, which reopened as Newport Academy Washington State.

Newport continued its geographical expansion in 2020 with the purchase of a 40-acre property in St. Cloud, Minnesota, for $5.4 million. This was Newport's first Midwestern location and was planned to provide residential care for up to 85 adolescents. In 2021, Newport Academy converted the former Oakley School in Oakley, Utah, into a residential treatment center. The Oakley campus opened later that year with a capacity to serve thirty boys and thirty girls.

In July 2021, the Canadian private equity firm Onex acquired a majority stake in Newport Academy's parent company, Newport Healthcare. Following the acquisition, Newport continued its expansion. In 2022, Newport Healthcare acquired Minnesota-based PrairieCare, adding nine psychiatric locations to its network. By 2023, Newport Healthcare operated 16 residential centers and 12 outpatient programs for adolescents. It also launched the Newport Institute to provide services for young adults.

In 2024, Newport opened a six-bed group home in Temecula, California, and offered similar substance-use-disorder-specific services in Minnesota, Utah, and Connecticut. In the same year, Brian Setzer, a former Walmart executive, was appointed as the CEO of Newport Healthcare, effective December 9, 2024, succeeding Joe Procopio, who became chairman of the board.

In October 2025, Newport healthcare announced layoffs and the closure of several locations, which the company described as a repositioning of its business to better align with health plans' demands for in-network coverage. It also closed its office in Irvine, California. Before the changes, the company operated about 800 beds and 21 outpatient programs. The same report noted that Onex's 2024 financial report started that value of its investment in Newport had decreased.

In a September 30, 2025 notice to the California Employment Development Department, Newport reported the closure of two Pleasanton locations and one in Danville, with 28 staff to be laid off by December 1, 2025. The said it had consolidated certain programs to align its resources with market realities and demand. According to the Pleasanton Weekly, the two Pleasanton facilities, Newport Academy Arena and Newport Academy Happy Valley, had been subject to substantiated complaints investigated by the California Department of Social Services, and Newport entered a two-year agreement with the state in 2023 to address violations and citations. The Arena facility received four Type A and 16 Type B citations over the period, and in November 2025 the state notified the company that cases for both facilities would be forwarded for legal review.

In February 2026, Newport announced it was leaving the San Francisco-area residential treatment market, affecting four locations, while keeping an outpatient program there and directing demand in Northern California to its Sacramento locations. In September and October 2026, Newport carried out permanent layoffs of approximately 68 employees at its St. Could, Minnesota facility, according to a WARN notice reported by the Minnesota Department of Employment and Economic Development.

== Operations ==
Newport Healthcare, through Newport Academy and Newport Institute, provides treatment for mental health conditions including depression, anxiety, trauma, eating disorders, and substance use issues. Its model combines clinical therapies with academic and experiential programs, such as equine therapy, art therapy, and Yoga. Newport also operates gender-separate facilities for its adolescent residential programs.

In addition to residential care, Newport operates outpatient services, including Partial Hospitalization Programs (PHP), Intensive Outpatient Programs (IOP), and standard outpatient counseling.

Newport's programs have received accreditation from the Joint Commission and the Commission on Accreditation of Rehabilitation Facilities (CARF), and its facilities hold state-level licenses.

Previously, Newport operated day schools.
