= Mol =

Mol or MOL may refer to:

== Arts and entertainment ==
- D mol, a Montenegrin vocal group
- Mol (TV series), a 2015 Pakistani television drama series
- M.O.L. (video), a 2002 video album by American rock band Disturbed
- Møl, a Danish blackgaze band

== Businesses and organizations ==
- MOL (company), a Hungarian oil and gas company
- MOL Trucks, a Belgian truck manufacturer
- Mitsui O.S.K. Lines, a Japanese international shipper

== Language ==
- Mol language, also Amol, Alatil, or Aru, a Torricelli language of Papua New Guinea
- mol, ISO 639-3 and ISO 639-2 code for Moldovan language

== People ==
- Mol (surname), Dutch surname (including people named "de Mol", "Mols" and "van Mol")
- Michael O'Leary (businessman), CEO of Ryanair

== Places ==
- Mol, Belgium, a municipality in Belgium
- Mol (Ada), a town in Serbia
- City Municipality of Ljubljana (Slovene: Mestna občina Ljubljana)
- Molde Airport, Årø in Norway (IATA code MOL)
- Moldova, UNDP country code

== Science and technology ==
=== Computing ===
- .mol, the file extension of the MDL Molfile chemical file format
- Mac-on-Linux, a virtualization software
- MOL-360, a systems programming language
- Method of lines, a mathematical method

=== Other uses in science and technology ===
- mol, symbol for the SI base mole (unit)
- Manned Orbiting Laboratory, a project of the United States Air Force's crewed spaceflight program
- Method of levels, a method in psychotherapy
- Method of lines, a technique for solving partial differential equations

== Other uses ==
- Metropolitan Open Land, a category of protected land in London, UK
- Member of the Order of Liberty
- MOL, vehicle registration code for Märkisch-Oderland, Germany

== See also ==
- Mohl, a surname
- Mole (disambiguation)
- Moll (disambiguation)
- Van Mol, a surname
- molar mass (the mass of a mole)
