= Albert Moll =

Albert Moll may refer to:

- Albert Moll (Canadian psychiatrist) (1906–1992), Canadian psychiatrist
- Albert Moll (German psychiatrist) (1862–1939), German psychiatrist

== See also ==
- Albert Mol (1917–2004), Dutch author, actor and television personality
