= Mohl =

Mohl or von Mohl is a surname. It may refer to:

- Aleksander Piotr Mohl (1899 –1954), Polish military and intelligence officer and diplomat
- Bertel Møhl (1936 - 2017), Danish marine zoologist and physiologist
- Carolina Müller-Möhl (born 1968), Swiss businesswoman, private investor and philanthropist
- Dávid Mohl (born 1985), Hungarian football player
- Ernst Friedrich von Mohl (July 20, 1849 – January 8, 1929), German classical philologist and professor
- Hugo von Mohl (1805–1872), German botanist
- Julius von Mohl (1800–1876), German orientalist
- Kristian Møhl (1876–1962), Danish painter and decorative artist
- Mary Elizabeth Mohl (22 February 1793 – 15 May 1883) was a British writer who was known as a salon hostess in Paris
- Nils Mohl (born 1971), German writer
- Ottmar von Mohl (1846–1922), German diplomat
- Robert von Mohl (1799–1875), German jurist

== See also ==
- Mount Mohl, Antarctica
- Mol (disambiguation)
- Moll (disambiguation)
