= Dietmar Schneider =

German neurologist

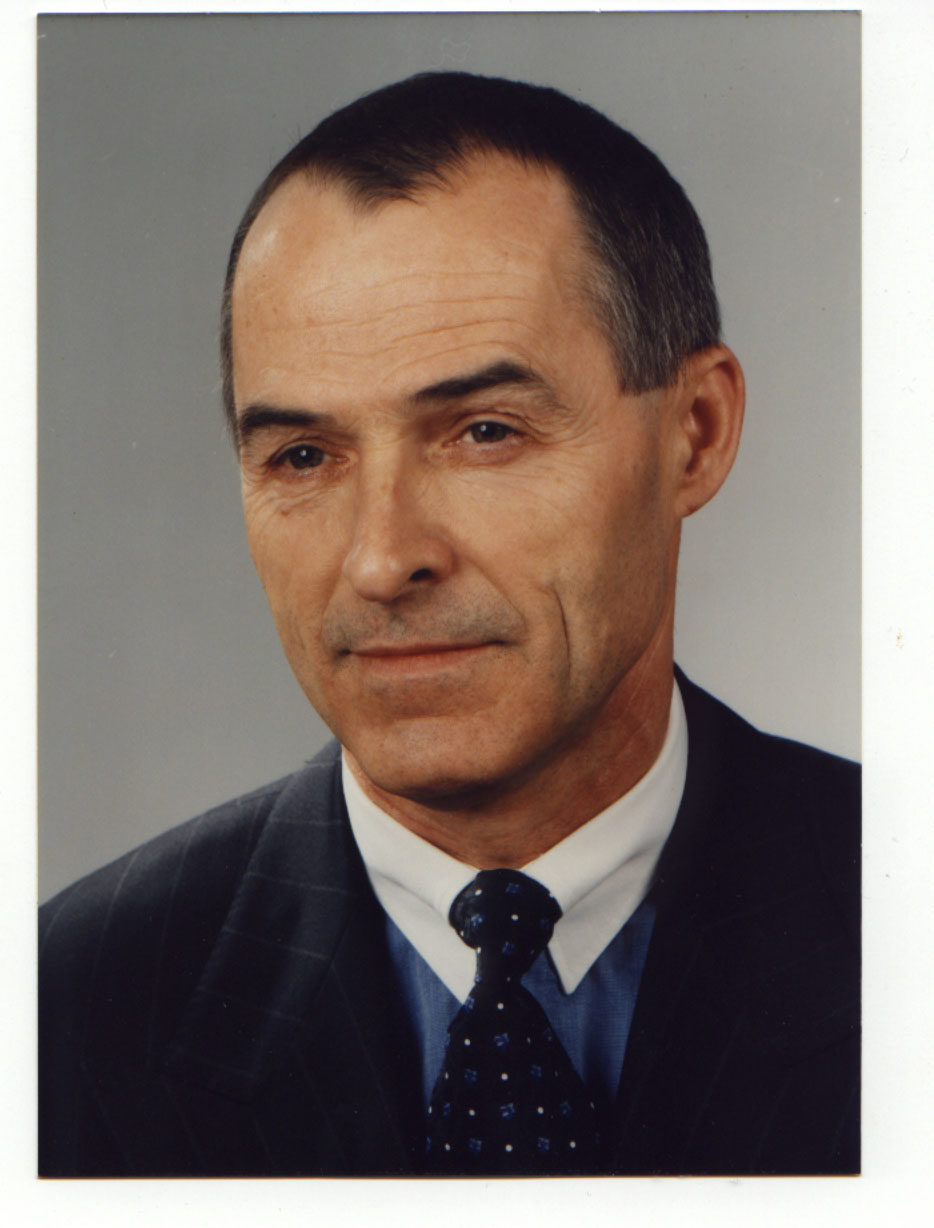
Dietmar Schneider, 1998

Dietmar Schneider (born 28 October 1943 in Rabenstein (now Chemnitz), Saxony, Germany) is a German internist, neurologist and an extra-curricular professor for neurological intensive care medicine (Critical Care Neurology), 1997 at the University of Leipzig Medical Center.

== Life and career ==
Schneider studied medicine from 1963 to 1969 in Leipzig, earned his M.D. supervised by Max Bürger's scholar Werner Ries in the same year with a gerontological thesis (Die Altershypoproteinämie am klinischen Krankengut [Senile hypoproteinemia of clinical patients], rated magna cum laude), completed two residencies at the University of Leipzig Medical Center: as a medical specialist for internal medicine (1974) supervised by tenured professor Rolf Emmrich and as a medical specialist for neurology and psychiatry (1979) supervised by tenured professor Peter Feudell. Schneider's professional passion became the intensive care and emergency medicine at the University of Leipzig Medical Center. He practiced 45 years there. Together with his fellow student Lothar Engelmann, also an internist, but also anesthetist as a second medical specialist, they both developed the department for intensive care medicine at the University of Leipzig Medical Center in almost 15 years of loyal friendship. The department grew to be one of the most recognized centers of non-operative intensive care medicine in the GDR, both professionally as well as the equally equipped in terms of beds and spatially connected intensive care and monitoring units with central monitoring, direct emergency routes to first aid rooms and its own technical and 24/7 laboratories with connection to dialysis equipment.

Among others, Schneider's expertise in intensive care internal medicine concentrated on emergency service for patients with cardiac pacemakers (1972–1975) and coronary angiography (1986/1987) as well as consultations for the neurosurgical and orthopedic departments of the University of Leipzig Medical Center (1981–1987). When Schneider started to work at the neurological clinic in 1987, the neurocritical emergency service with cephalic CAT scan (1987–1999, CAT scan, computed axial tomography or computer-assisted tomography) and consultations at the Leipzig Heart Center (1987–1996) followed. In 1993, a modern neurological intensive care unit opened, professionally, structurally prepared and with personnel selected by Schneider, as well as a spatially integrated stroke unit with its initially own personnel in 1998. Both neurocritical units moved to the new building “Zentrum für Konservative Medizin” [Center for Conservative Medicine] in 2009 (21 beds with mechanical ventilation, including 12 certified transregional stroke-unit-beds). The internal intensive care department led by Lothar Engelmann was located on the same floor and directly adjacent. In the same year, Schneider handed over the management of the intensive neurological department to his successors (Carsten Hobohm and Dominik Michalski), continued his works on stroke studies with the help of third-party funds (until 2011) and was the manager of the Multiplace HBOT chamber at the clinic for anesthesiology and intensive care therapy until February 28, 2014. He worked on a 24/7 on-call service for emergencies that have to be treated hyperbarically.

In his profession, Schneider initially worked on biochemical approaches of geriatric medicine and in preparation of bone marrow transplants histomorphologically (supervised by Eberhard Perlick, Werner Helbig). In addition and subsequently, acute medicine, intensive care medicine and emergency medicine were pillars of this works, coma and apallic syndrome, cerebral hypoxia and ischemia, the resuscitation of the brain, the monitoring of cerebral homeostasis and strokes, after the reunification in Germany predominantly stroke studies. Since 1998, his research group has been researching mainly in animal studies the use of hyperbaric oxygen (HBOT: Hyperbaric oxygen therapy) for treatment of acute focal brain ischemia.

In this context, Schneider installed 4 HBOT chambers with third-party funds (cell chamber, animal testing chamber, monoplace chamber, multiplace intensive care chamber). One habilitation (Dominik Michalski) and eight doctorates followed. At the University of Leipzig Medical Center, the Hyperbaric Center for Emergency and Intensive Care Medicine of Leipzig has been operational since 2015. Schneider decisively contributed to the founding of the center by adding a Multiplace HBOT intensive care chamber.

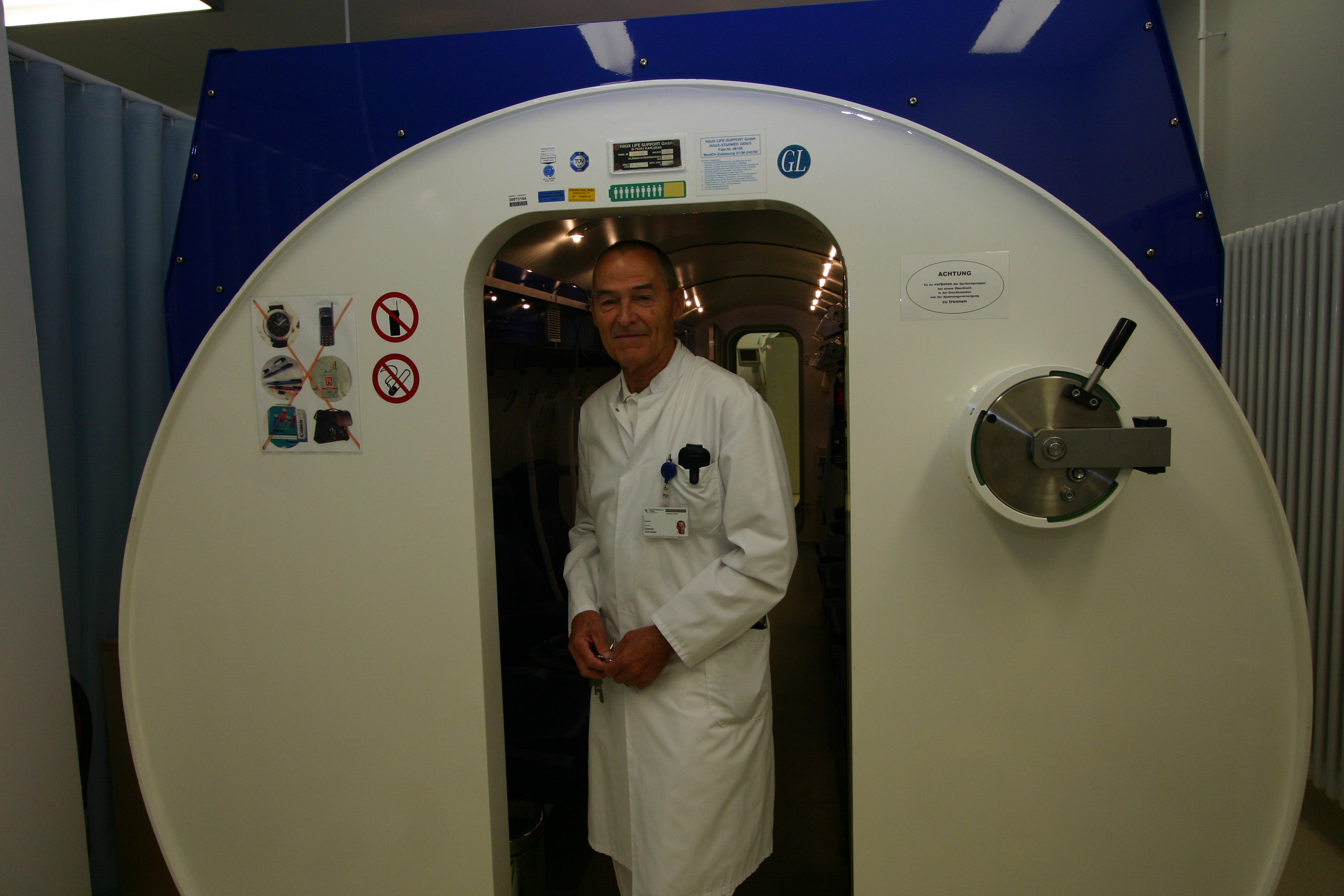
Dietmar Schneider at the Multiplace HBOT chamber at the University of Leipzig Medical Center, 2013

Schneider was also one of the doctor deputies at the emergency service (SMH) in Leipzig for a long time (1976–1992, emergency service headquarters (SMH) (today: emergency service, around-the-clock dispatching); SMH (Schnelle Medizinische Hilfe [rapid medical help]), divided into DMH (urgent medical help, today: ambulance service) and DHD (urgent domiciliary visits, today: general medical emergency service). Schneider has been a consultant physician for brain death diagnosis (IHA “Irreversibler Hirnfunktionsausfall” [irreversible total loss of brain function]) since 1994 in the Eastern region of the German Organ Transplantation Foundation DSO as well as the commissioner for organ donations of the State Chamber of Physicians of Saxony (SLÄK) since 2014.

== Publications ==
- Köhler, Heinz; Schneider, Dietmar; Engelmann, Lothar (eds.) Intensivmedizin. Innere Medizin und Grenzgebiete. [Intensive Care Medicine. Internal Medicine and Adjacent Medical Fields.] Johann Ambrosius Barth, Leipzig 1982, license number (GDR) 793 643 9
- Schneider, Dietmar (ed.) Zerebrale Hypoxie und Ischämie vaskulär-zirkulatorischer Ätiologie. [Cerebral Hypoxia and Ischemia of Vascular-circulatory Etiology.] Johann Ambrosius Barth, Leipzig 1982, license number (GDR) 793 709 5
- Feudell, Peter; Schneider, Dietmar; Wagner, Armin (eds.) Neurologische Intensivmedizin. [Neurological Intensive Care Medicine.] Johann Ambrosius Barth, Leipzig 1986, ISBN 3-335-00021-8, license number (GDR) 793 789 6
- Schneider, Dietmar. Neuromonitoring. Zerebrovaskuläre und globalhypoxische Komazustände. Diagnostik-Therapiekontrolle-Prognostik. [Neurological Monitoring. Cerebrovascular and Global Hypoxic States of Coma. Diagnostics – Therapy Control – Prognostics.] Johann Ambrosius Barth, Leipzig 1990. ISBN 3-335-00236-9
- Schneider, Dietmar; Engelmann, Lothar; Heinrich, Peter (eds.) Intensivmedizin. Grundlagen. [Intensive Care Medicine. Basics.] Johann Ambrosius Barth, Leipzig, Heidelberg 1992. ISBN 3-335-00276-8
- Engelmann, Lothar; Schneider, Dietmar (eds.) Intensivmedizin. Nichtoperative Disziplinen. [Intensive Care Medicine. Non-operative Disciplines.] Johann Ambrosius Barth, Leipzig, Berlin, Heidelberg 1993. ISBN 3-335-00255-5
- Schneider, Dietmar; Schwab, Stefan; Hacke, Werner (eds.) Kontroversen in der Neurointensivmedizin. [Controversies in Neurological Intensive Care Medicine.] Thieme, Stuttgart, New York 2005. ISBN 3-13-133921-7
- Publications in various medical journals (1968-2019)

== Awards and recognition ==
- Hans-Berger-Preis 1990, for the post-doctoral thesis "Neuromonitoring. Zerebrovaskuläre und globalhypoxische Komazustände. Diagnostik-Therapiekontrolle-Prognostik". [Neurological Monitoring. Cerebrovascular and Global Hypoxic States of Coma. Diagnostics – Therapy Control – Prognostics.]
- Paper of the Year 2008
- List of recognized best medical specialists 2000 of the magazine Focus

== Memberships ==
Schneider has been appointed and/or elected to various positions in expert panels, committees and councils, among others

- German Society of Medical Intensive Care and Emergency Medicine (DGIIN, council 1996–2016)
- German Society of Neurological Intensive Care and Emergency Medicine (DGNI, former ANIM, 1. Chairman and President of Congress 1997, Counselor 1992–1996, Treasurer 1998–2012, native founding member of the DGNI Foundation 2007^{[45]})
- German Neurological Society (DGN, Program Committee 2001–2004, Further Education Committee 2003–2013, DIVI delegate 2000–2008)
- German Interdisciplinary Society for Intensive Care and Emergency Medicine (DIVI, Treasurer 2008–2014, Counselor DIVI Foundation since 2012)
- European Stroke Conference (ESC, Scientific Committee 2001–2004)
- State Chamber of Physicians of Saxony (SLÄK Task Force Brain Death Diagnostics 2002-2011, Elected Representative 2011–2019, Commissioner for Organ Donations since 2014, Transplant Committee since 2011)
