= Verster =

Verster is a Dutch and Afrikaans surname. Notable people with the surname include:

- Floris Verster (1861–1927), Dutch painter
- François Verster (born 1969), South African film director and documentary maker
- Jacobus Verster (1919–1981), South African military commander
