= Molé =

Molé is a surname of French origin. Notable people with the surname include:

- Louis-Mathieu Molé (1781–1855), French statesman
- Mathieu Molé (1584–1656), French statesman

== See also ==
- Mole (surname)
