= Zirkel (Studentenverbindung) =

Symbol used by European student organizations

A Zirkel (German for 'circle', as in a circle of friends) is a monogram used in European student societies in countries such as Germany, Austria, Switzerland, Belgium, Hungary, Latvia, Estonia (Studentenverbindungen) as a post-nominal letter.

== Look and meaning ==
A Zirkel consists of intertwined lines, followed by an exclamation mark if the society is still active. The lines mostly show the first letters of the name of the Studentenverbindung and/or the letters v, c, f or e, f, v.

Examples:

Zirkel of Corps Hubertia Freiburg in Freiburg, Germany

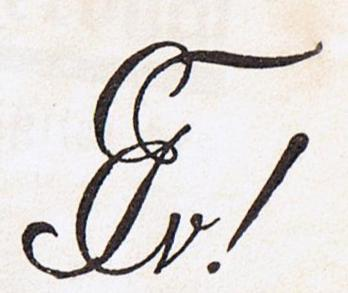
Zirkel of Corps Germania München in Munich, Germany

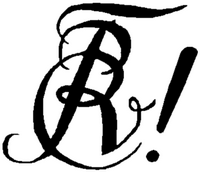
Zirkel of Corps Altsachsen in Dresden, Germany

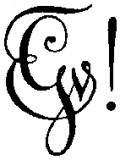
Zirkel of Corps Gothia Innsbruck in Innsbruck, Austria

Zirkel of Sängerschaft zu St. Pauli Jena in Jena, Germany

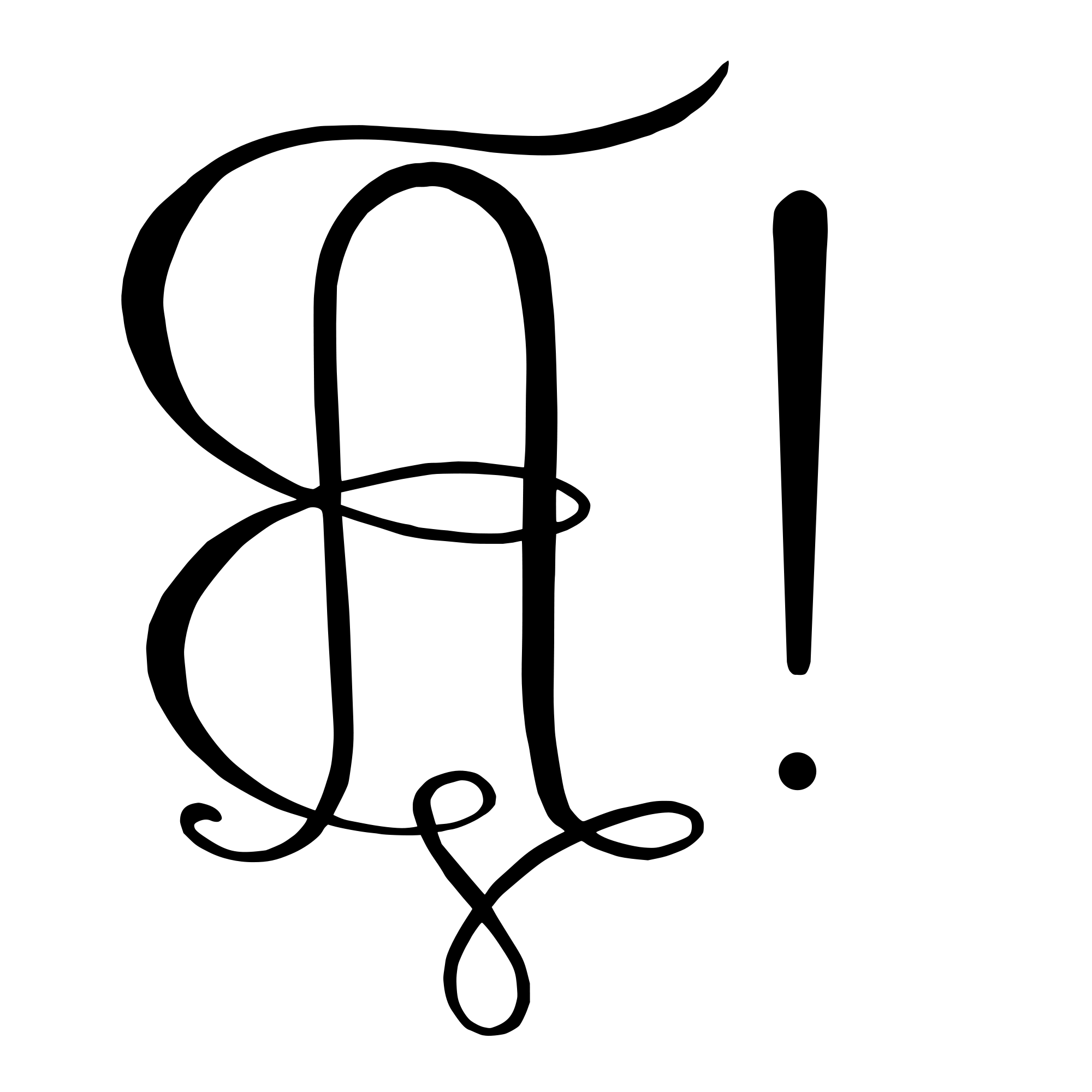
Zirkel of Burschenschaft Ascania zu Köln in Cologne, Germany

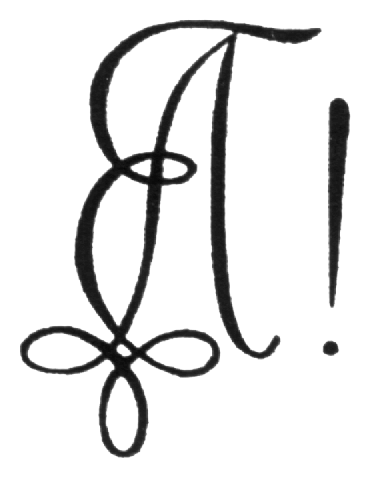
Zirkel of Frankfurt-Leipziger Burschenschaft Arminia in Leipzig, Germany

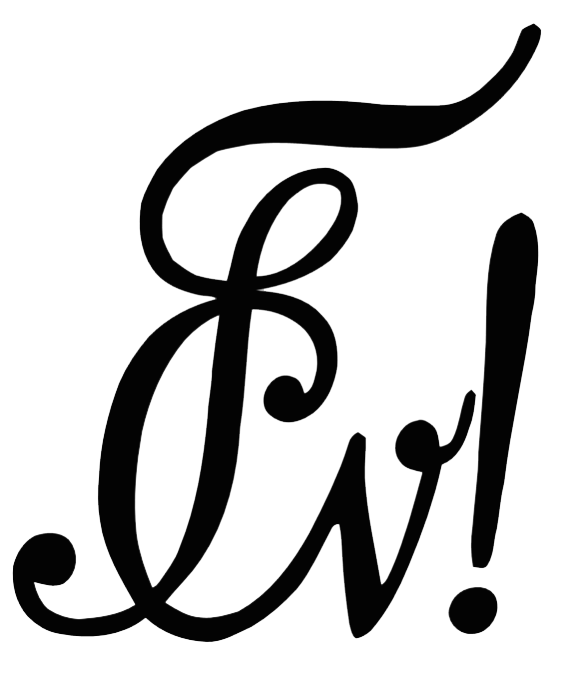
Zirkel of Landsmannschaft Schottland in Tübingen, Germany

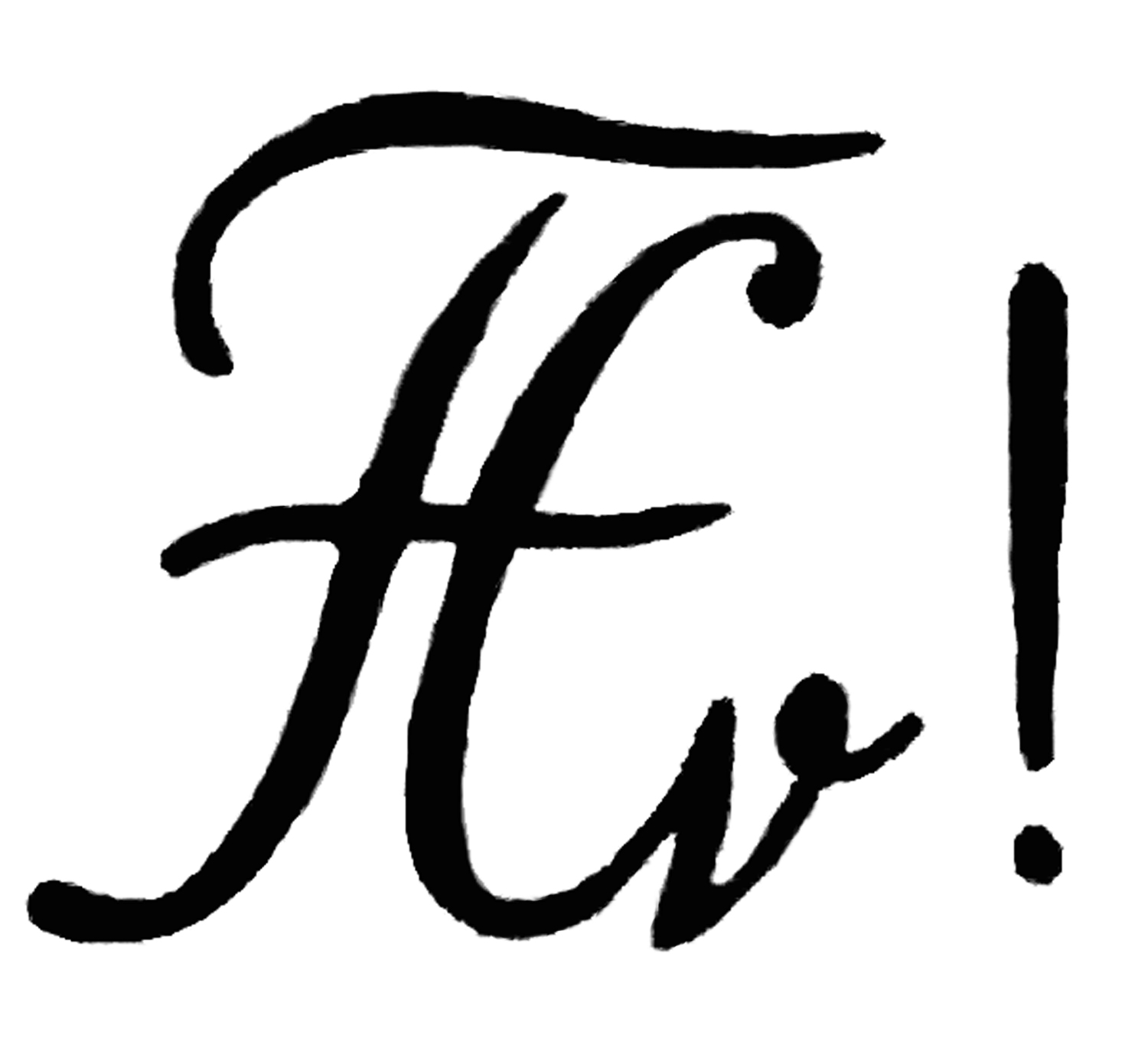
Zirkel of Sängerschaft Hohentübingen in Tübingen, Germany

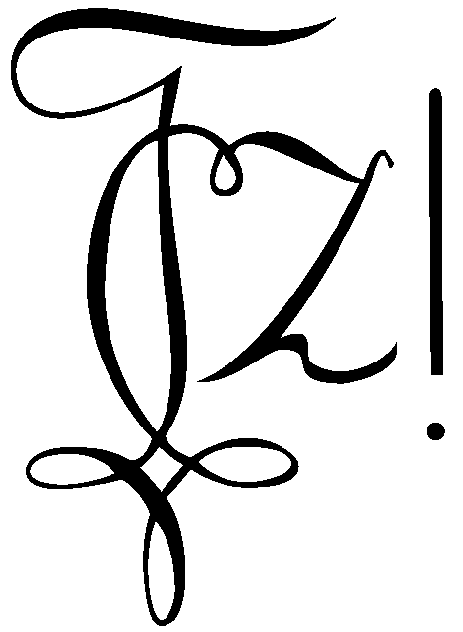
Zirkel of K.V.H.C. Zuid-Oost-Vlaamse (de ZOV) in Leuven, Belgium

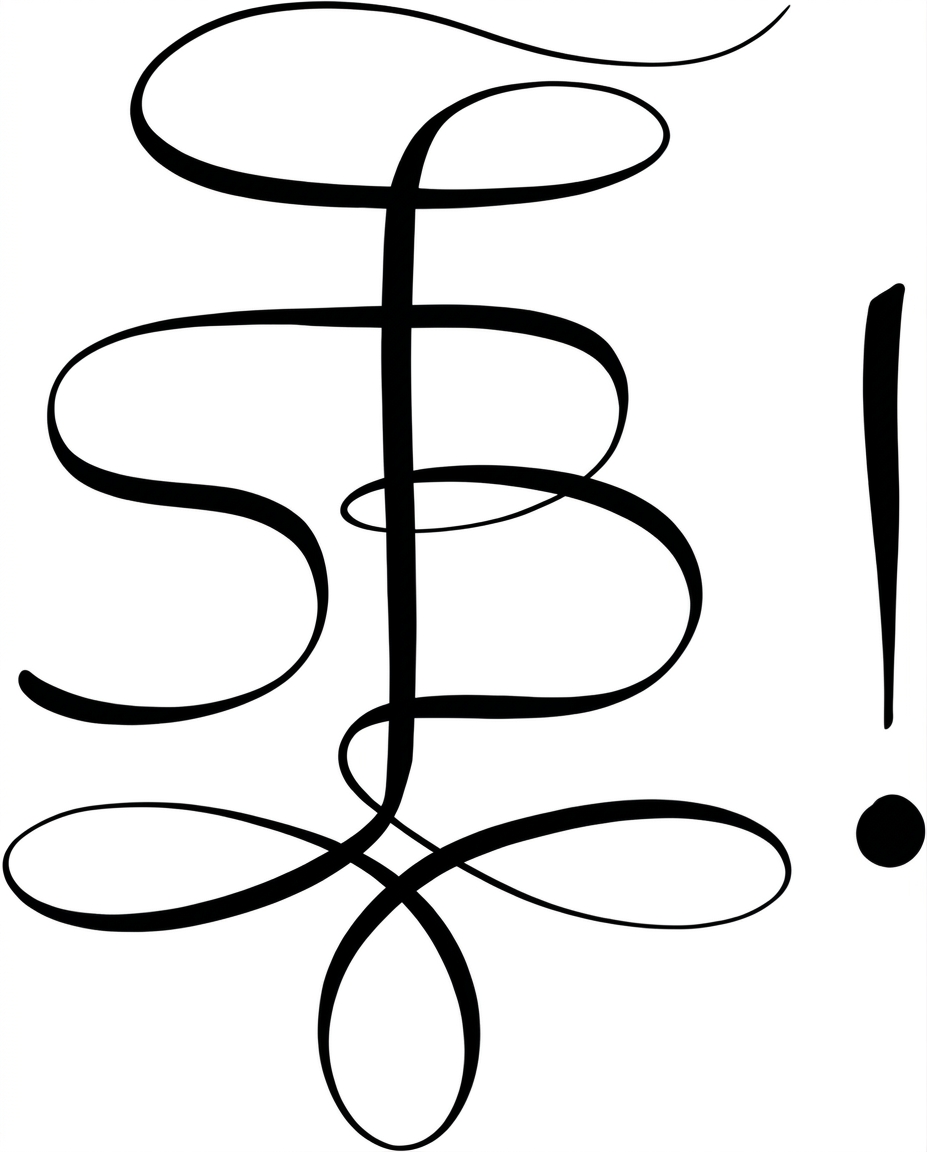
Zirkel of Academicus Sanctae Barbae Ordo in Louvain-la-Neuve, Belgium

Meaning of v-c-f:

- Vivant fratres coniuncti ('Long live the united brothers') or
- Vivat circulus fratrum ('Long live the circle of brothers') or
- Vivat, crescat, floreat ('Live, grow, flourish').

Meaning of e-f-v:

- Ehre, Freiheit, Vaterland ('Honour, Liberty, Fatherland').

== Usage ==
The members of the Studentenverbindung use the Zirkel as sign on Couleur or other things e.g. beer glasses etc. If a member signs in affairs of its Studentenverbindung, it places the Zirkel after its signature. This use is similar to the use of postnominals in English-speaking countries.

Examples:

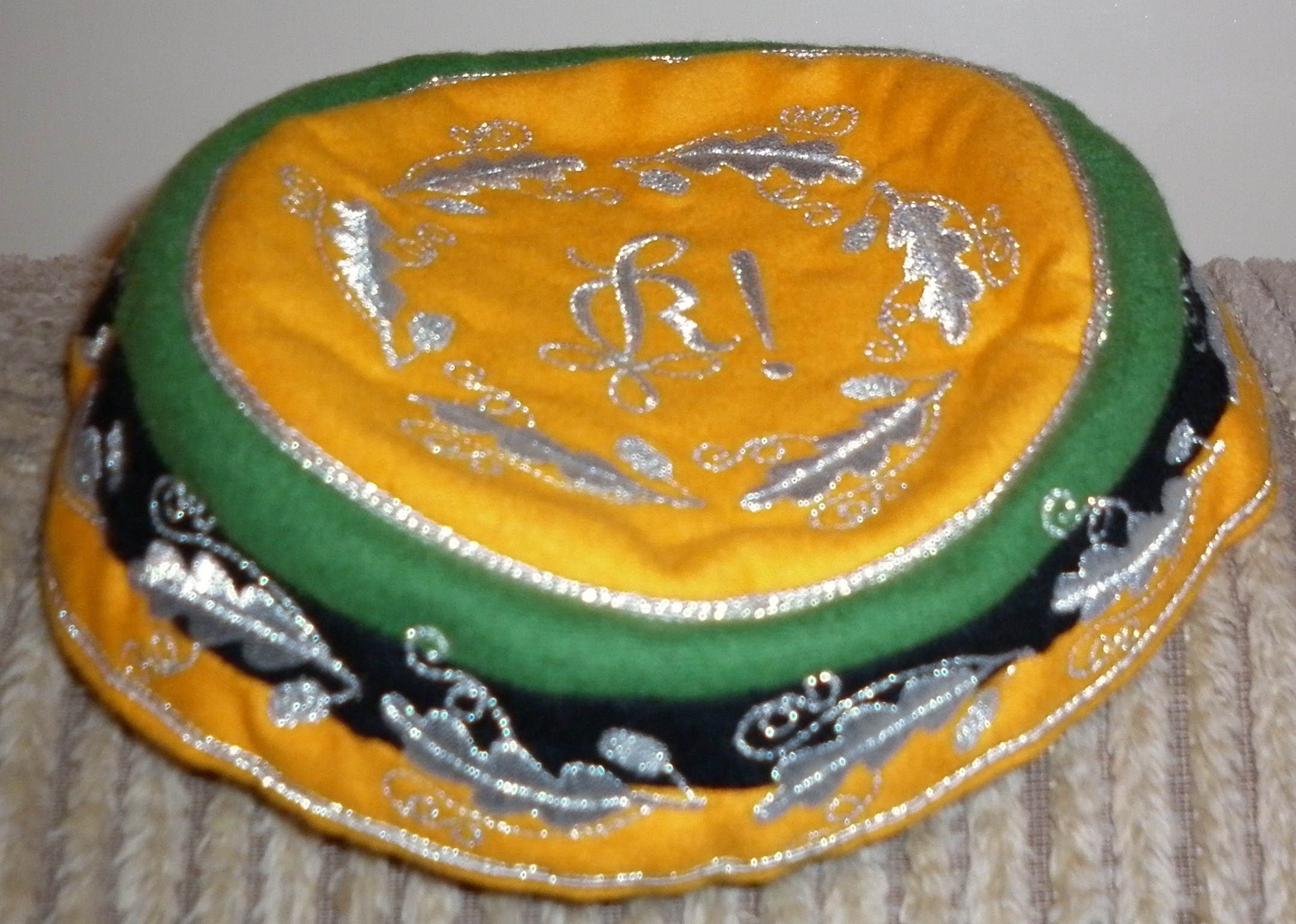
Straßencerevis with embroidered Zirkel and oak leaves

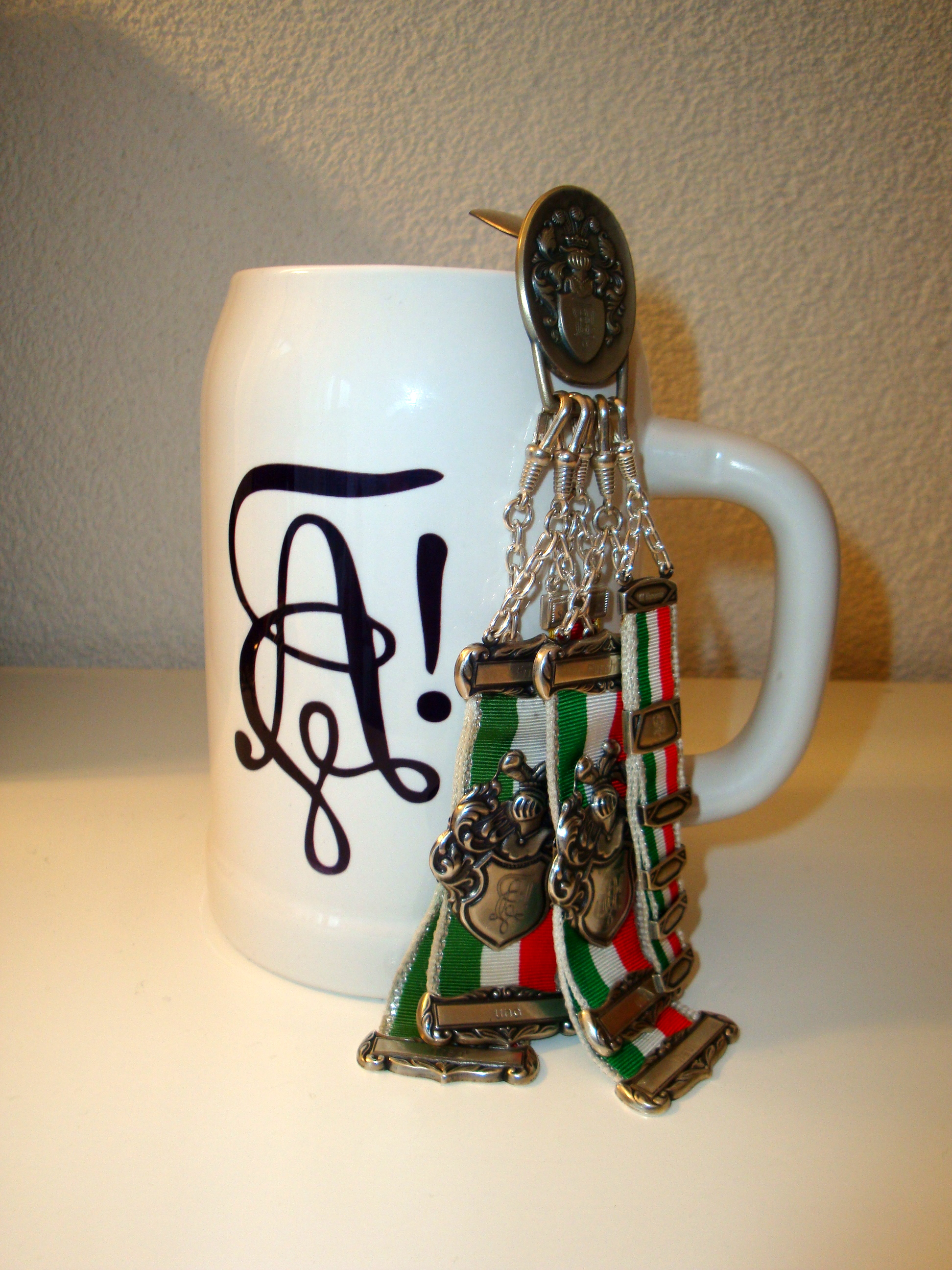
beer mug and Zipfel with Zirkel

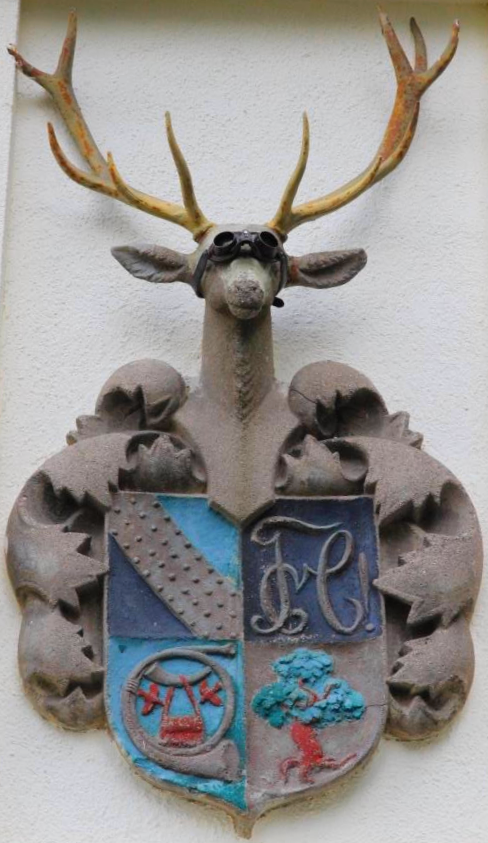
Crest of the fraternity Corps Hubertia Freiburg with a Zirkel in the upper right. This crest is a wall display on the outside of a fraternity house.

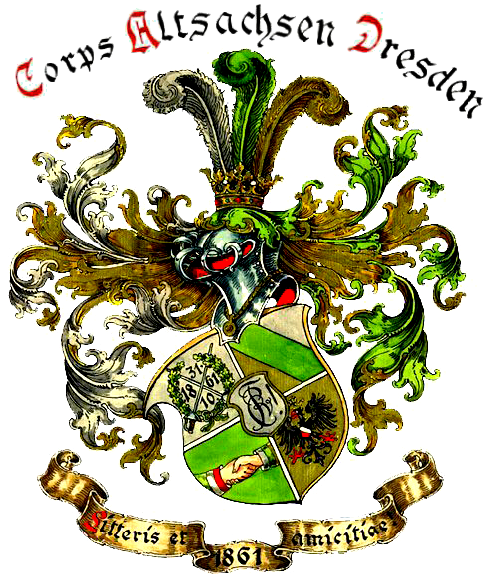
The center of the official fraternity crest of Corps Altsachsen Dresden is marked with a Zirkel.

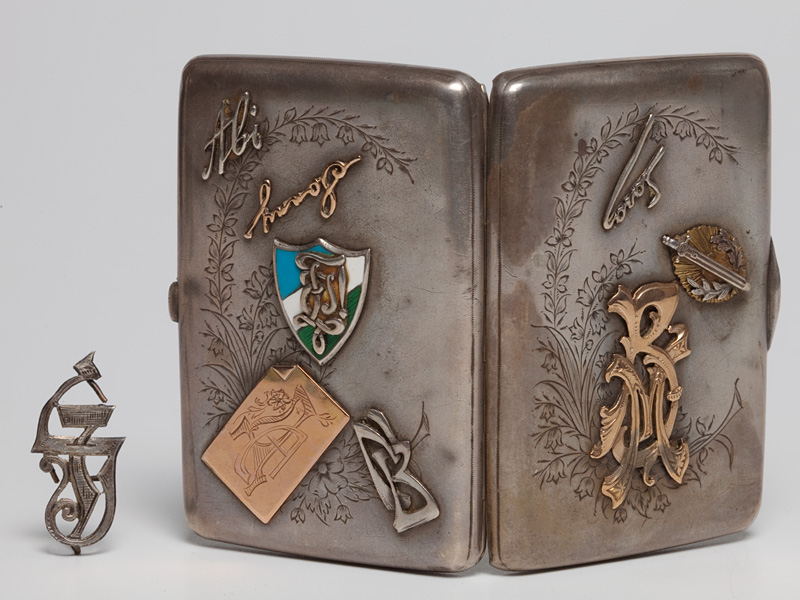
Cigarette case with the Zirkel of a Jewish Studentenverbindung from Basel, in the Jewish Museum of Switzerland’s collection.

== See also ==
- Post-nominal letters
