= Kalfie Martin =

South African military commander and rugby union player

Lieutenant General Henry James Martin SM CBE DFC
- Born: 10 June 1910; Bloemfontein
- Died: 20 October 2000 (aged 90); Pretoria
- Military career
- Allegiance: South Africa
- Branch: South African Air Force
- Service years: 1935–1968
- Rank: Lieutenant General
- Nickname: Kalfie
- Wars: World War II
- Awards: Southern Cross Medal SM Union Medal Order of the British Empire CBE Distinguished Flying Cross (United Kingdom) DFC 1939–45 Star Africa Star War Medal 1939–1945 Africa Service Medal (WWII) Croix de Guerre
- Other work: Author
- Height: 1.83 m (6 ft 0 in)
- Weight: 95 kg (209 lb)
- School: Grey College, Bloemfontein

Rugby union career
- Position: Tighthead prop
Amateur team(s)
Years	Team	Apps	(Points)
- Garrison RFC
Provincial / State sides
Years	Team	Apps	(Points)
–	Transvaal		
International career
Years	Team	Apps	(Points)
1937	South Africa	1	(0)
1937	South Africa (tour)	15	(9)

Lieutenant-General Henry James "Kalfie" Martin SM CBE DFC (10 June 1910 – 20 October 2000) was a South African military commander.

== Military career ==
He joined the South African Air Force in 1935 and played rugby union for his country in 1937. During World War II, he commanded 3 Wing in North Africa (1942–1943), and in 1945 he commanded 4 Group, which was responsible for transporting South African servicemen back home from Italy. He was CO of AFB Waterkloof from 1949 to 1951.

He served as Quartermaster-General from 1 December 1953 to 31 October 1959, Air Chief of Staff (1 May 1965 to 30 June 1966) as Chief of the Air Force from 1 July 1966 to 30 November 1967, and as Chief of Defence Staff from 1 December 1967 to 31 December 1968.

== Awards and decorations ==
- Southern Cross Medal (1952) (SM) (South Africa)
- Union Medal (South Africa)
- Order of the British Empire (Commander) (CBE) (Great Britain)
- Distinguished Flying Cross (United Kingdom) (DFC) (Great Britain)
- 1939–45 Star (Great Britain)
- Africa Star (NORTH AFRICA 1942–43 clasp) (Great Britain)
- War Medal 1939–1945 (Great Britain)
- Africa Service Medal (WWII) (South Africa)
- Croix de Guerre (Belgium)

== Rugby career ==
As a member of the Air Force, Martin played his club rugby for Garrison RFC and he also played provincial rugby for Transvaal. In 1937 he toured with the Springboks to Australia and New Zealand. He played his first and only test match against Australia on 17 July 1937. He also played 15 tour matches.

=== Test history ===
No.	Opponents	Results (SA 1st)	Position	Tries	Dates	Venue
1.	Australia	26–17	Tighthead prop		17 Jul 1937	Sydney Cricket Ground, Sydney

== See also ==
- List of South African military chiefs
- South African Air Force
- List of South Africa national rugby union players – Springbok no. 256

Military offices
Preceded by Toby Moll	Chief of Defence Staff; 1967–1968	Vacant Title next held by Booysie van der Riet in 1972
Preceded by Barend Viljoen	Chief of the South African Air Force; 1965–1967	Succeeded by Jacobus Verster
Preceded by HJ Bronkhorst	Quartermaster General South African Defence Force; 1953–1959	Succeeded by JSJ van der Merwe
Preceded by Toby Moll	OC AFB Ysterplaat; 1951–1952	Succeeded by AAD McKellar
