= The Mole =

The Mole may refer to:

== Film and television ==
- The Mole (Krtek)
- De Mol (TV series), a Belgium reality television series licensed internationally known in English as The Mole
  - The Mole (Australian TV series), Australian version
  - The Mole (British TV series), UK version
  - The Mole (American TV series), US version
  - Wie is de Mol? (Dutch TV series), NL version
- The Mole (film), 2011 Polish film
- The Mole: Undercover in North Korea, 2020 Danish/Norwegian/Swedish/UK co-production documentary
- The Mole (Brooklyn Nine-Nine), an episode of Brooklyn Nine-Nine

== Fictional entities ==
- The Mole (Happy Tree Friends), from the cartoon series Happy Tree Friends
- The Mole, from the animated musical film South Park: Bigger, Longer & Uncut
- The Mole, a character in three fantasy novels in Terry Brooks' Shannara series
- The Mole, Gaetan Molière, a character in the animated film Atlantis: The Lost Empire and its sequel, Atlantis: Milo's Return
- The Mole, a tunnelling machine in the TV series Thunderbirds

== See also ==
- Mole (disambiguation)
