= Jean Baptiste Joseph Delambre =

French mathematician and astronomer (1749–1822)

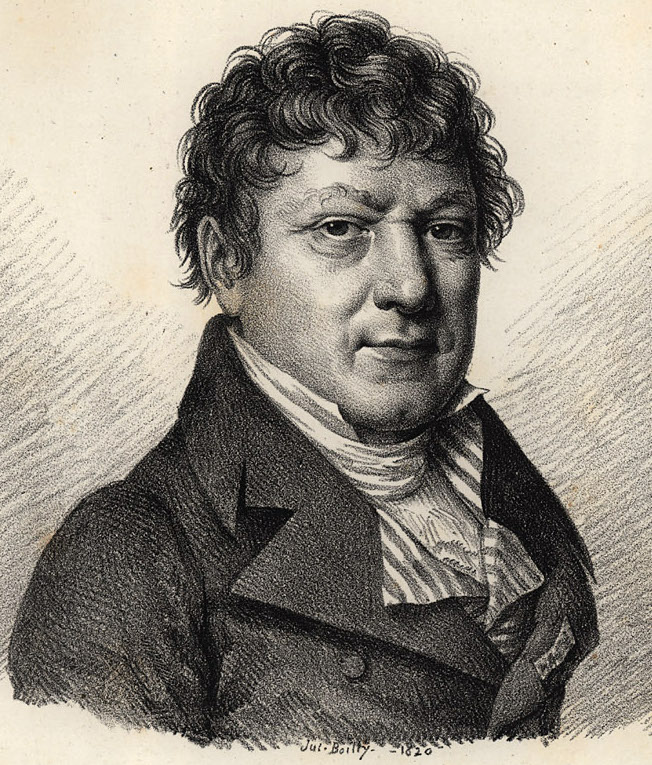
- Born: 19 September 1749; Amiens, Kingdom of France
- Died: 19 August 1822 (aged 72); Paris, Kingdom of France
- Known for: Arc measurement of Delambre and Méchain; Delambre analogies
- Scientific career
- Fields: Astronomy
- Doctoral advisor: Jérôme Lalande
- Doctoral students: Gerard Moll

Jean Baptiste Joseph, chevalier Delambre (19 September 1749 – 19 August 1822) was a French mathematician, astronomer, historian of astronomy, and geodesist. He was also director of the Paris Observatory, and author of well-known books on the history of astronomy from ancient times to the 18th century. He is known for his expedition to gather geodetical measurements in order to define the metre.

== Biography ==
=== Early years and education ===
After a childhood fever, he suffered from very sensitive eyes, and believed that he would soon go blind. For fear of losing his ability to read, he read any book available and trained his memory. He thus immersed himself in Greek and Latin literature, acquired the ability to recall entire pages verbatim weeks after reading them, became fluent in Italian, English and German and even wrote an unpublished Règle ou méthode facile pour apprendre la langue anglaise (Easy rule or method for learning English).

=== Expedition of Delambre and Méchain ===
Delambre quickly achieved success in his career in astronomy, such that in 1788, he was elected a foreign member of the Royal Swedish Academy of Sciences. In 1790, to establish a universally accepted foundation for the definition of measures, the National Constituent Assembly asked the French Academy of Sciences to introduce a new unit of length. The academics decided on the metre, defined as 1 / 10,000,000 of the distance from the North Pole to the equator, and prepared to organise an expedition to measure the length of the meridian arc between Dunkirk and Barcelona. This portion of the meridian, which also passes through Paris, was to serve as the basis for the length of the quarter meridian, connecting the North Pole with the Equator. In April 1791, the academy's Metric Commission confided this mission to Jean-Dominique de Cassini, Adrien-Marie Legendre and Pierre Méchain. Cassini was chosen to head the northern expedition but, as a royalist, he refused to serve under the revolutionary government after the arrest of King Louis XVI on his Flight to Varennes. On 15 February 1792, Delambre was elected unanimously a member of the French Academy of Sciences and in May 1792, after Cassini's final refusal, was placed in charge of the northern expedition, measuring the meridian from Dunkirk to Rodez in the south of France. Pierre Méchain headed the southern expedition, measuring from Barcelona to Rodez. The measurements were finished in 1798. The gathered data were presented to an international conference of savants in Paris the following year.

=== President of the Academy of Sciences ===
In 1801, First Consul Bonaparte took the presidency of the French Academy of Sciences and appointed Delambre its Permanent Secretary for the Mathematical Sciences, a post he held until his death.

After Méchain's death in 1804, he was appointed director of the Paris Observatory. He was also professor of astronomy at the Collège de France.

Delambre was one of the first astronomers to derive astronomical equations from analytical formulas, was the author of Delambre's analogies and, after the age of 70, also the author of works on the history of astronomy like the Histoire de l'astronomie.

Delambre died in 1822 and was interred in Père Lachaise Cemetery in Paris.

== Personal life ==
In 1804, he married Elisabeth-Aglaée Leblanc de Pommard, a widow with whom he had lived already for a long time. Her son, Achille-César-Charles de Pommard (1781–1807) assisted Delambre on several occasions in his astronomical and geodetical surveys, notably the measuring of the baselines for the meridian survey, and the latitude definition for Paris in December 1799 which was presented to the Conference of Savants.

Delambre was an atheist.

== Honours and awards ==
He was a knight (chevalier) of the Order of Saint Michael and of the Légion d'honneur. In 1803, he was elected a member of the American Philosophical Society in Philadelphia. He was elected a Foreign Honorary Member of the American Academy of Arts and Sciences in 1822.

The crater Delambre on the Moon is named after him.

He is one of the original 72 male names on the Eiffel Tower.

== Works ==
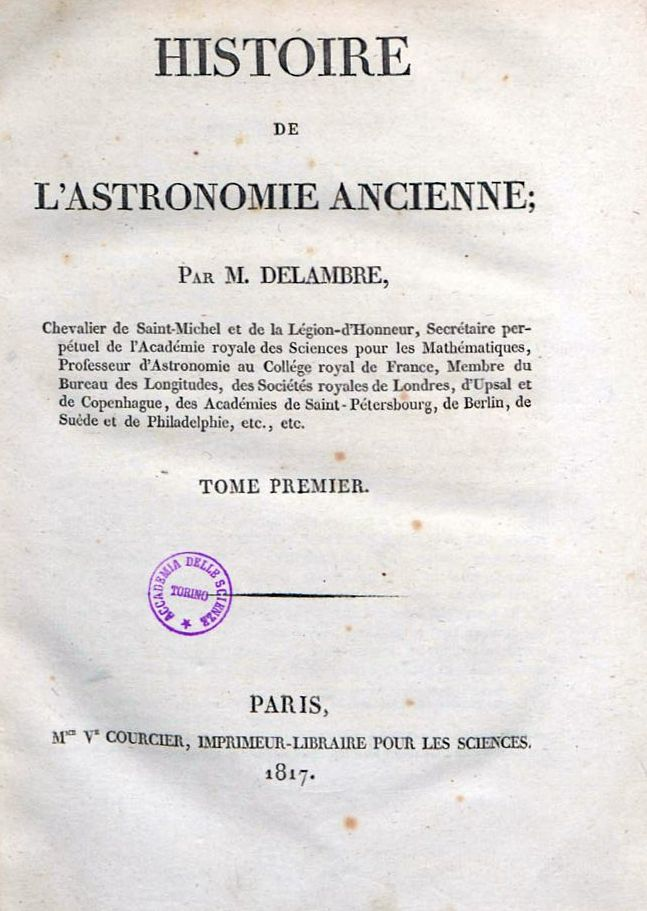
Histoire de l'astronomie ancienne, 1817

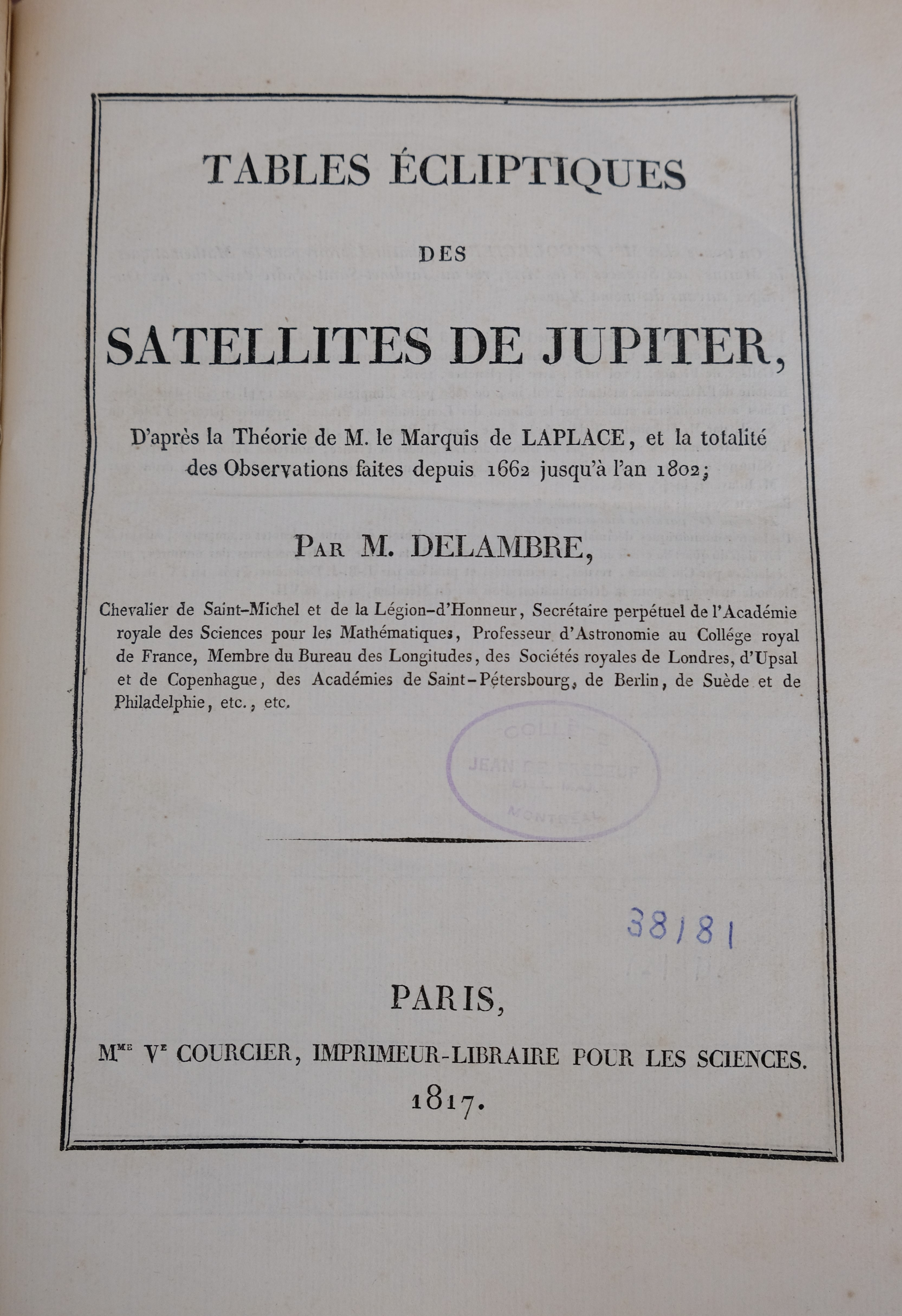
Title page of an 1817 copy of "Tables écliptiques des satellites de Jupiter"

- Méthodes analytiques pour la détermination d'un arc du méridien (Crapelet, Paris, 1799)
- Notice historique sur M. Méchain, lue le 5 messidor XIII (Baudouin, Paris, January 1806; this is the eulogy on the late Pierre Méchain, read at the academy by Secretary Delambre on 24 June 1805)
- Base du système métrique décimal, ou Mesure de l'arc du méridien – compris entre les parallèles de Dunkerque et Barcelone, exécutée en 1792 et années suivantes, par MM. Méchain et Delambre. (editor; Baudouin, Imprimeur de l'Institut National; Paris; 3. vol.; January 1806, 1807, 1810; this includes both his own and Méchain's data gathered during the meridian survey 1792–1799 and calculations derived thereof)
- Rapport historique sur le progrès des sciences mathématiques depuis 1799 (Imprimerie Impériale, Paris, 1810)
- Tables écliptiques des satellites de Jupiter: d'après la théorie de M. le Marquis de Laplace, et la totalité des observations faites depuis 1662 jusqu'à l'an 1802 (Paris : Courcier, 1817.)
- A history of astronomy, comprising four works and six volumes in all:
  - Histoire de l'astronomie ancienne, Paris: M^{me} V^{e} Courcier, 1817. 2 volumes; vol. 1, lxxii, 556 pp., 1 folded plate; vol. 2, viii, 639 pp., [1], 16 folded plates. OCLC 490232972.
    Reprinted by New York and London: Johnson Reprint Corporation, 1965 (Sources of Science, #23), with a new preface by Otto Neugebauer. OCLC 648488.
    Text on line: vol. 1, , , ; vol. 2, , .
  - Histoire de l'astronomie du moyen age, Paris: M^{me} V^{e} Courcier, 1819. lxxxiv, 640 pp., 17 folded plates. OCLC 490233042.
    Reprinted by New York and London: Johnson Reprint Corporation, 1965 (Sources of Science, #24.) OCLC 647834.
    Also reprinted by Paris: J. Gabay, 2006. OCLC 494627038.
    Text on line: .
  - Histoire de l'astronomie moderne, Paris: M^{me} V^{e} Courcier, 1821. 2 volumes; vol. 1, lxxxii, 715 pp., [1], 9 folded plates; vol. 2, [4], 804 pp., 8 folded plates. OCLC 490233154.
    Reprinted by New York and London: Johnson Reprint Corporation, 1969 (Sources of Science, #25), with a new introduction and tables of contents by I. Bernard Cohen. OCLC 647838.
    Also reprinted by Paris: Editions Jacques Gabay, 2006. OCLC 493779358.
    This takes the history to the 17th century.
    Text on line: both volumes, with usable plates, ; vol. 1, , , ; vol. 2, .
  - Histoire de l'astronomie au dix-huitième siècle, edited by Claude-Louis Mathieu, Paris: Bachelier (successeur de M^{me} V^{e} Courcier), 1827. lii, 796 p., 3 folded plates. OCLC 490233264
    Reprinted by Paris: J. Gabay, 2004. OCLC 470502171.
    This includes the history of astronomy in the 18th century, especially critiques of his colleagues at the academy, which he withheld to be published posthumously.
    Text on line: ; with usable plates, .
- Grandeur et figure de la terre, ouvrage augmenté de notes, de cartes (1912)(edited by Guillaume Bigourdan, Gauthiers-Villars, Paris, 1912; about the figure of the Earth)

Some works are digitalized on Paris Observatory digital library.

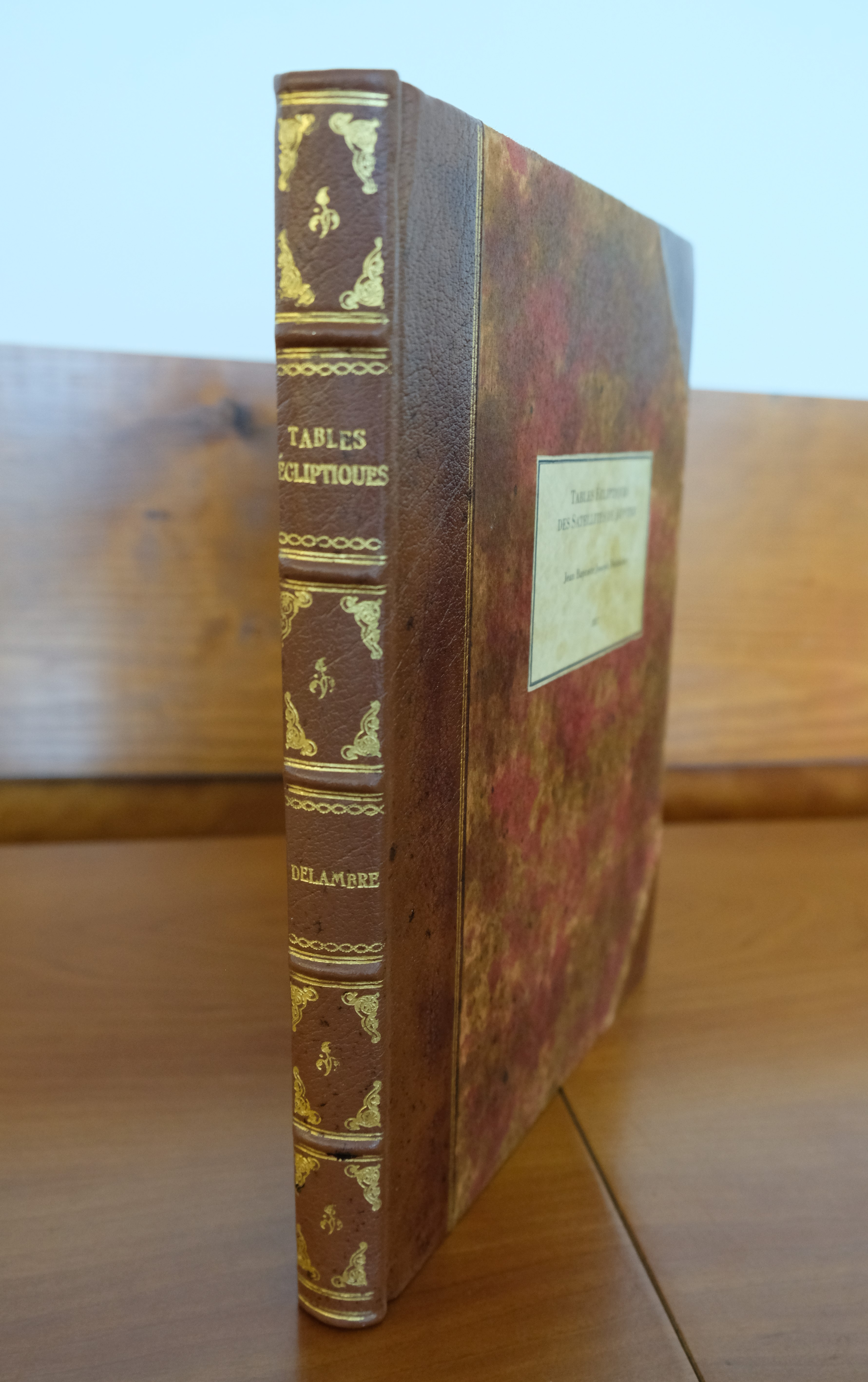
1817 copy of "Tables écliptiques des satellites de Jupiter"

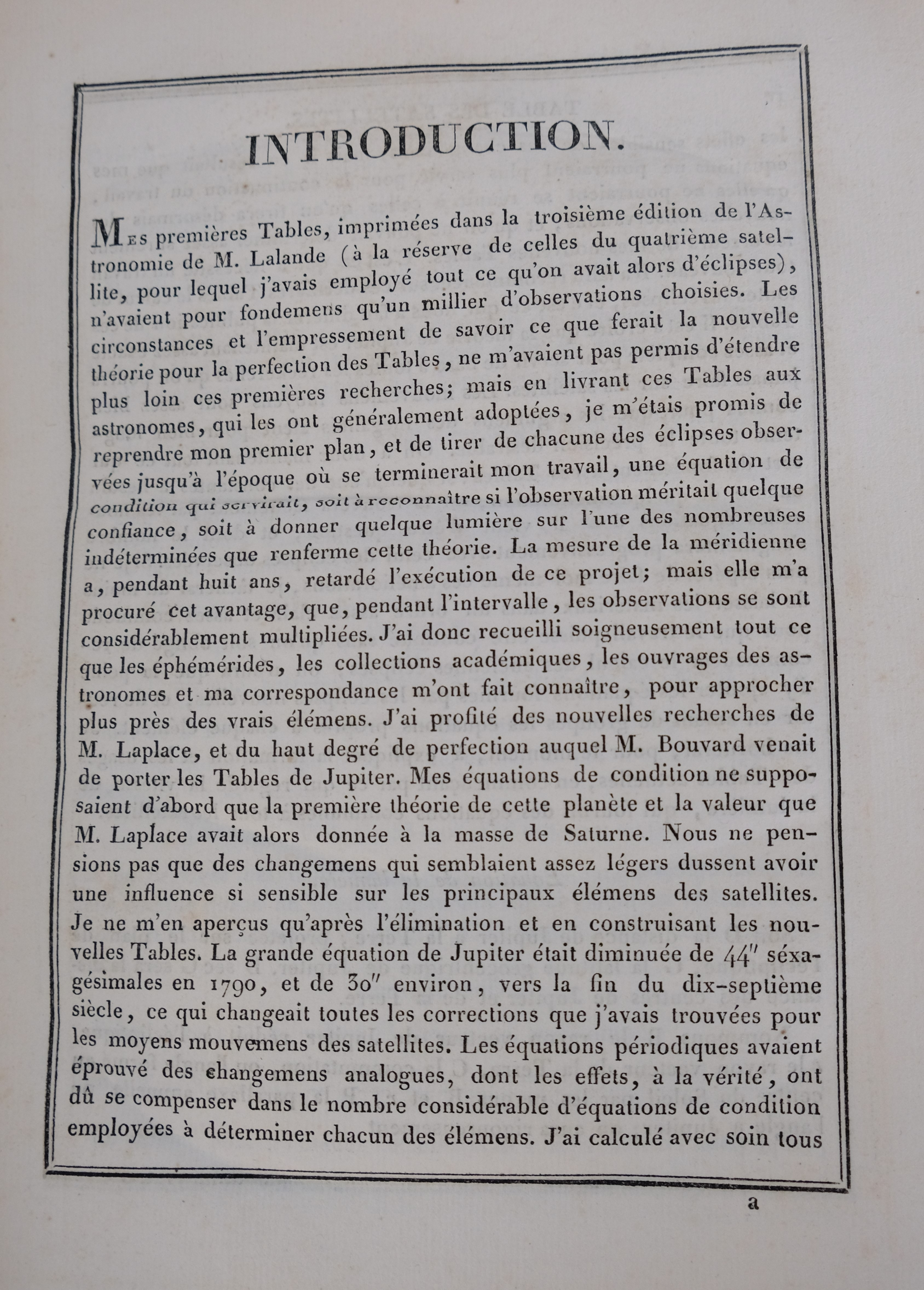
1817 introduction to "Tables écliptiques des satellites de Jupiter"

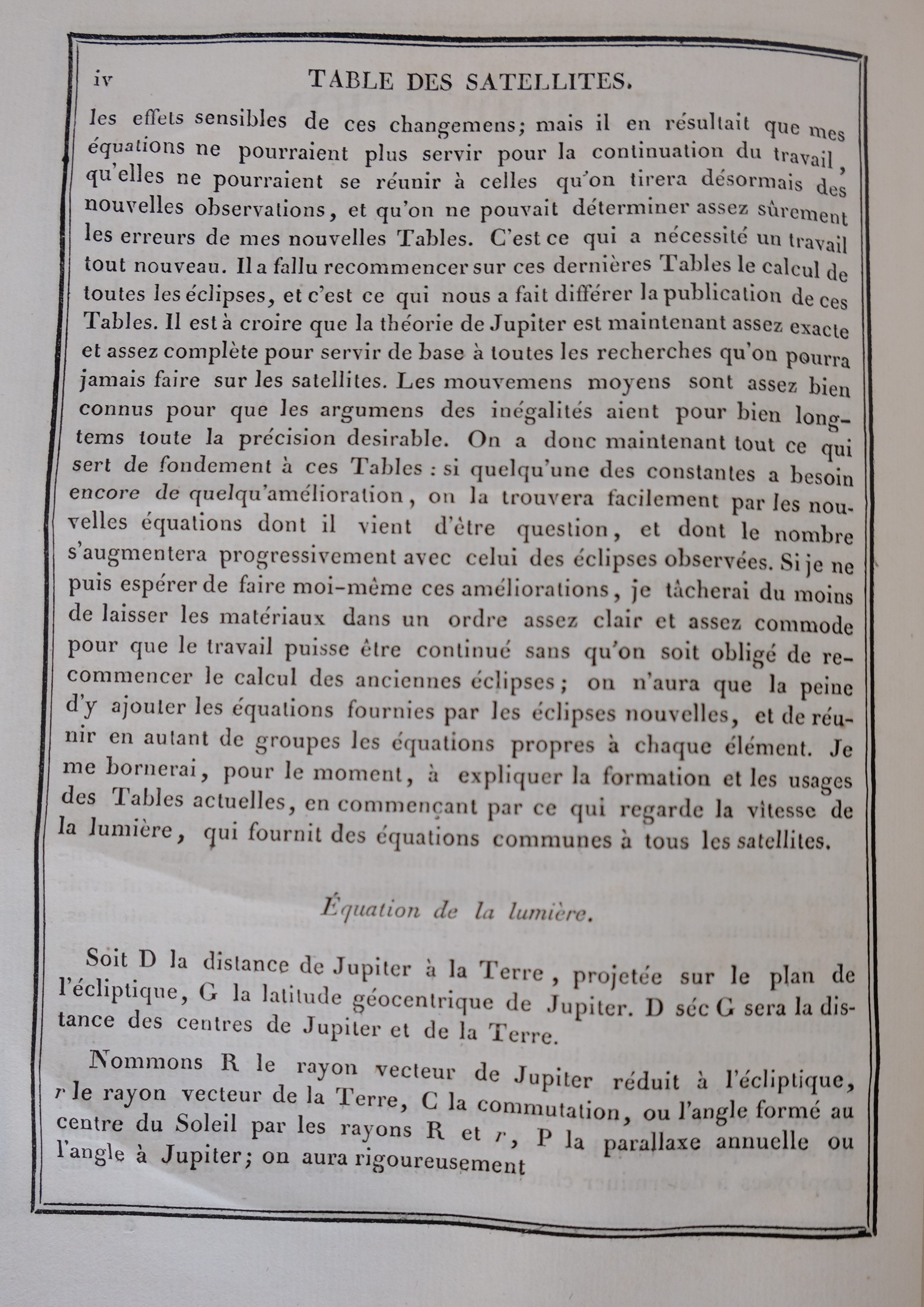
1817 introduction to "Tables écliptiques des satellites de Jupiter"

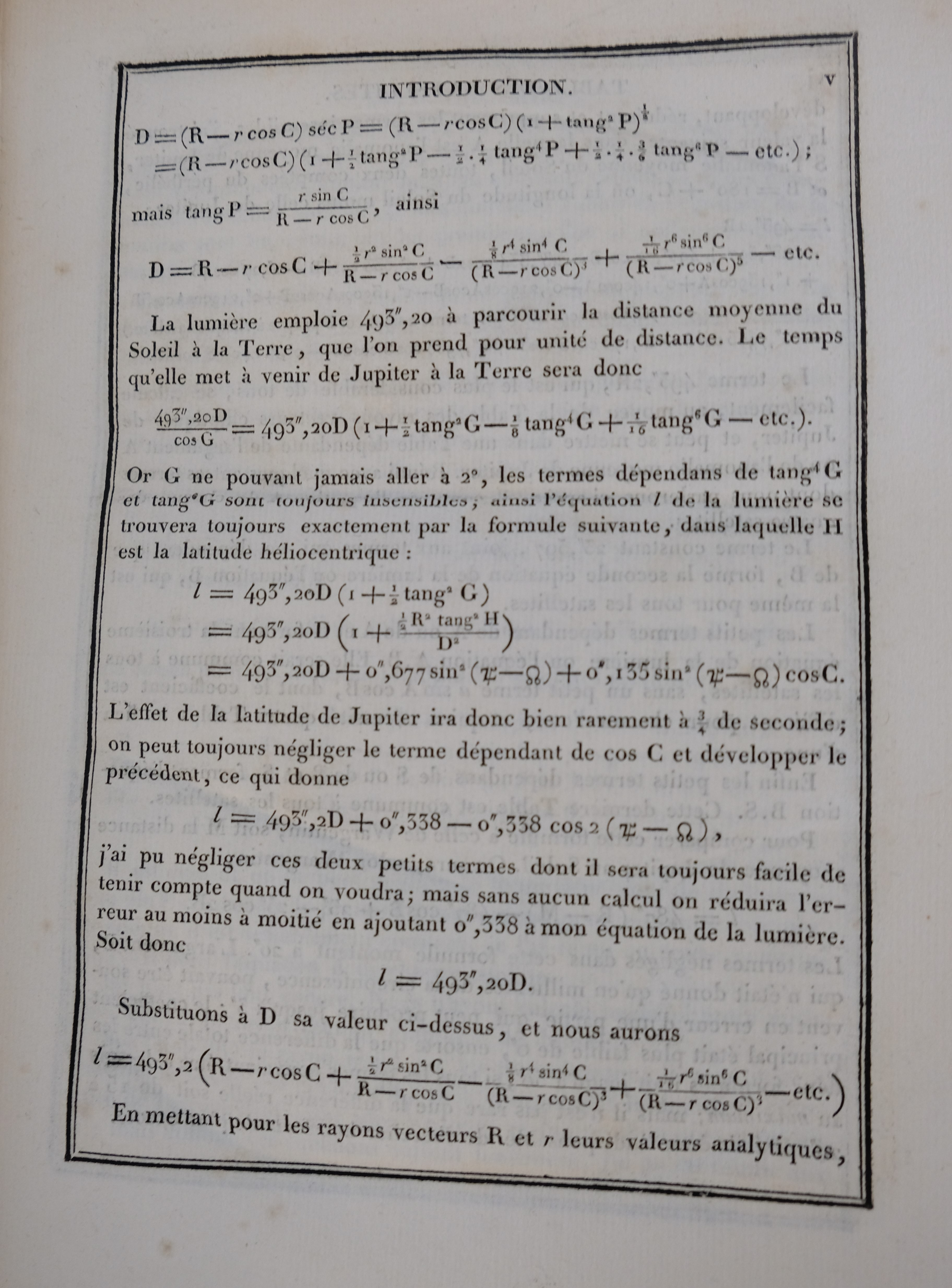
1817 introduction to "Tables écliptiques des satellites de Jupiter"

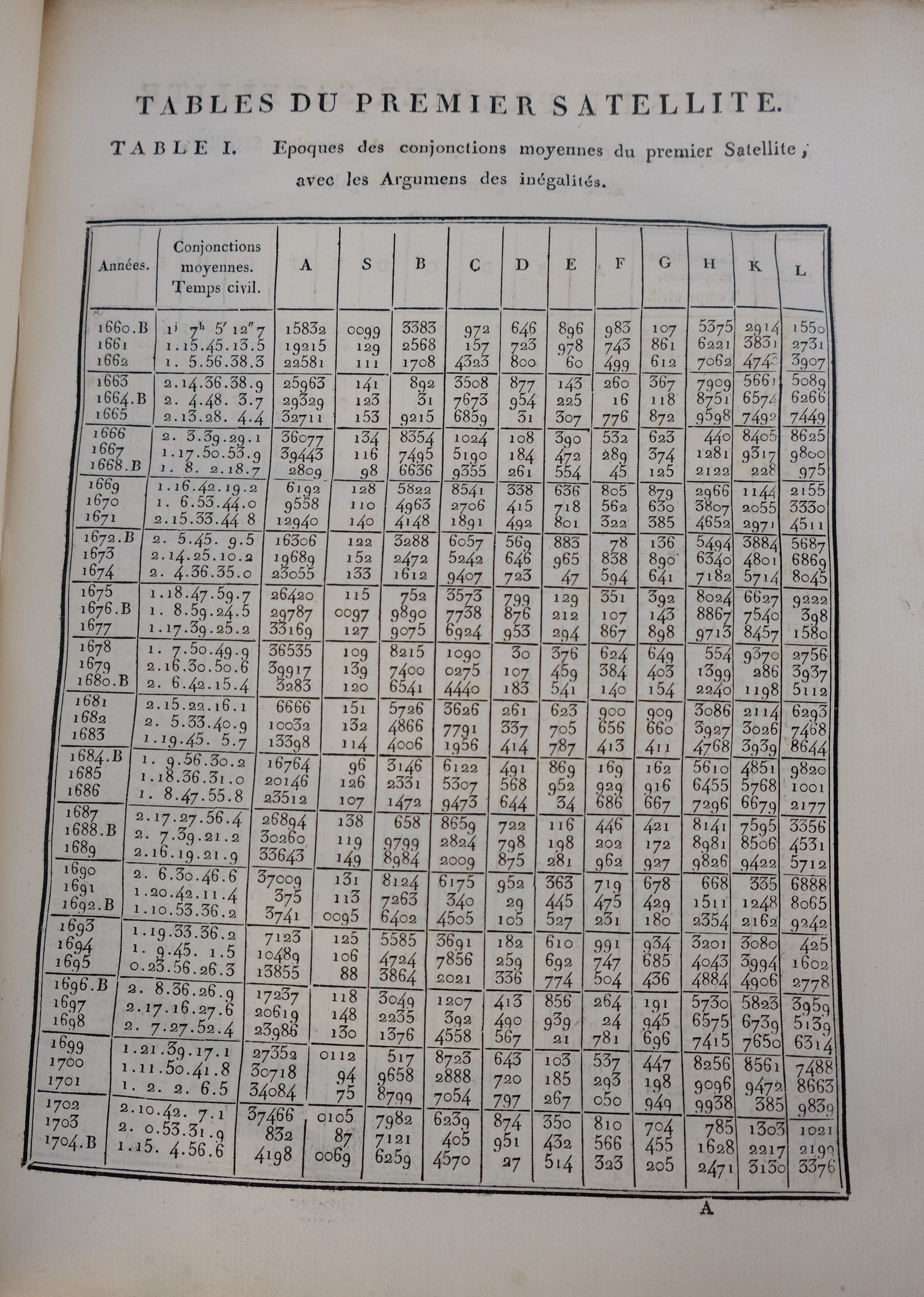
Excerpt from an 1817 copy of "Tables écliptiques des satellites de Jupiter"

== See also ==
- Delambre analogies
- History of the metre
- Arc measurement of Delambre and Méchain
- Seconds pendulum
