= Landsmannschaft Schottland =

German fraternity

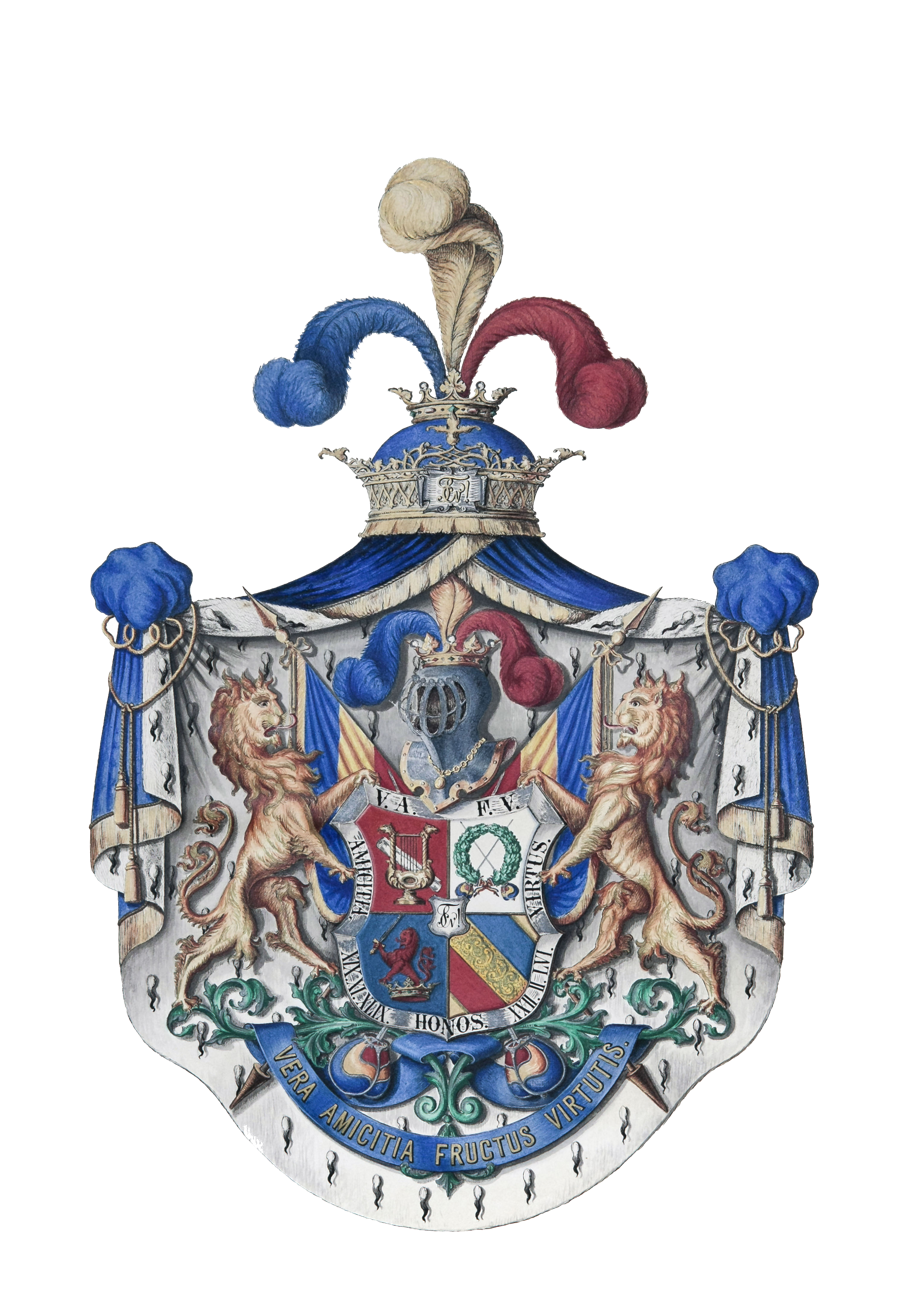
- Founded: November 19, 1849; 176 years ago University of Tübingen
- Type: Studentenverbindung
- Affiliation: Coburger Convent
- Status: Active
- Emphasis: Academic dueling
- Scope: Local
- Motto: Vera amicitia fructus virtutis! "True friendship is the fruit of the virtuous"
- Slogan: Amicitia honovirtus "Friendship - Honour - Virtue"
- Colors: Blue, Gold and Red
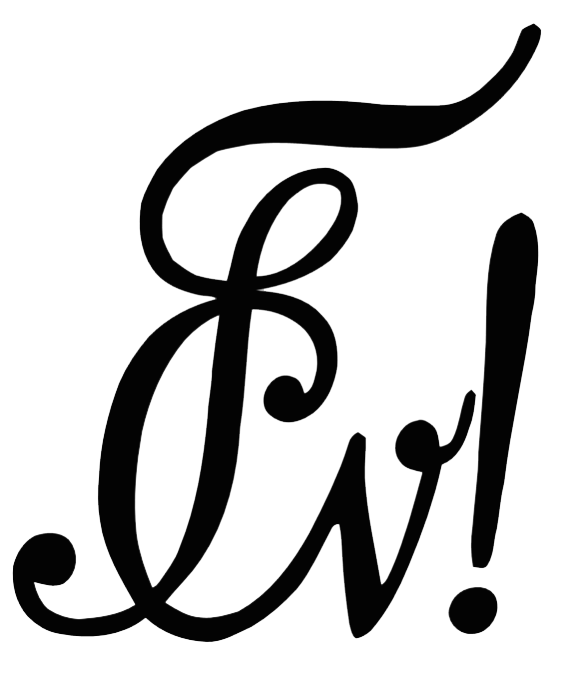
- Zirkel
- Chapters: 1
- Members: 250 active
- Headquarters: Schwabstr 20; Tübingen, Baden-Württemberg 72074; Germany
- Website: schottland-tuebingen.de

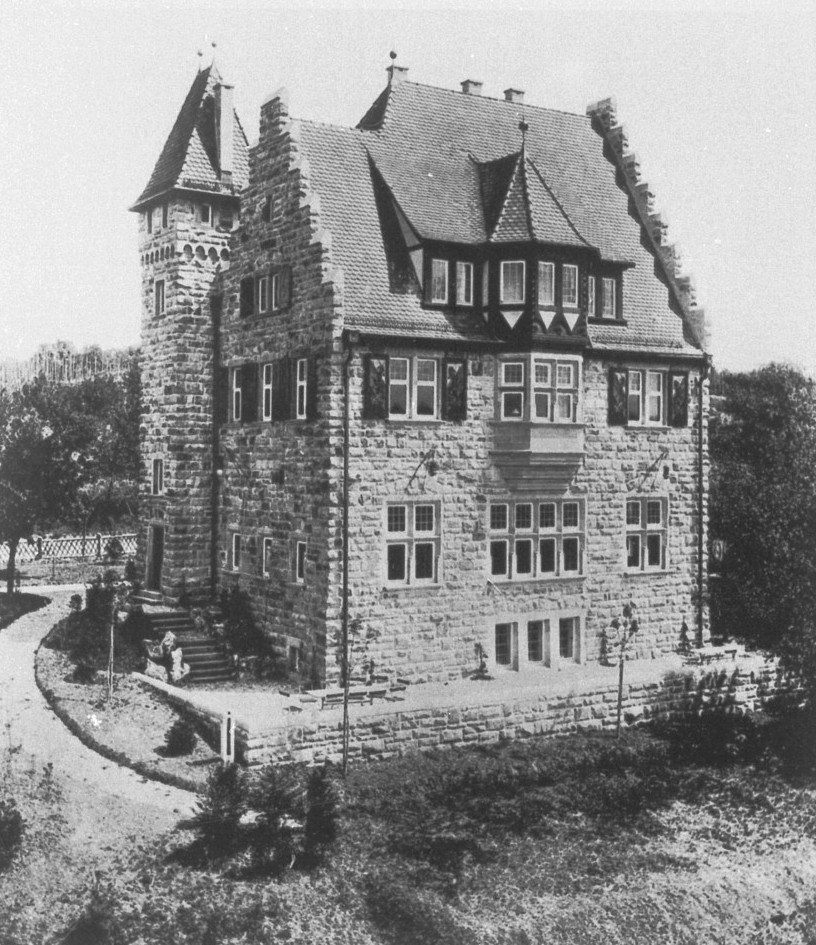
The fraternity house

The Landsmannschaft Schottland ("Scotland") is a German fraternity – not to be confused with the American variety – situated in Tübingen, a university city in south-western Germany. It is a brotherhood of students and alumni of University of Tübingen, with membership being a lifelong commitment.

== History ==
Schottland was founded on 19 November 1849. The name comes from an early meeting place of members, a pub called the "Schottei". Since 1905, Schottland resides in its fraternity house, a multi-storey mansion in the style of a Scottish castle, on the top of a hill overlooking Tübingen.

The members of Schottland commit themselves to the principles of tolerance and democracy as well as the tradition of "akademisches Fechten" (academic fencing), a variety of fencing.

Schottland is a member of an association of about 100 fraternities, that practice obligatory fencing and wear colours – the Coburger Convent.

== Symbols ==
The fraternity's slogan is s Amicitia honovirtus, Latin for "Friendship - Honour - Virtue". Its motto is Vera amicitia fructus virtutis!, Latin for: "true friendship is the fruit of the virtuous".

A "Band" (a type of ribbon or sash) in the colours blue-gold-red and the traditional student cap (in Tubingen-style) in blue are worn by members. The colours are derived from the old Scottish royal colours.

== Notable members ==
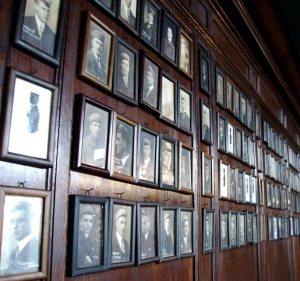
Member gallery

- Rolf Emmrich, professor of internal medicine
- Ernst von Mohl, professor in Saint Petersburg
- Friedrich von Riekert, DVP-politician in Prussia and member of Reichstag (German Empire)
- Jonathan Roth, BDL-politician in Prussia and member of Reichstag (German Empire)
- Alexander von Zagareli, professor at St. Petersburg University and co-founder of Tbilisi State University
