= Ernst von Mohl =

German classical philologist (1849–1929)

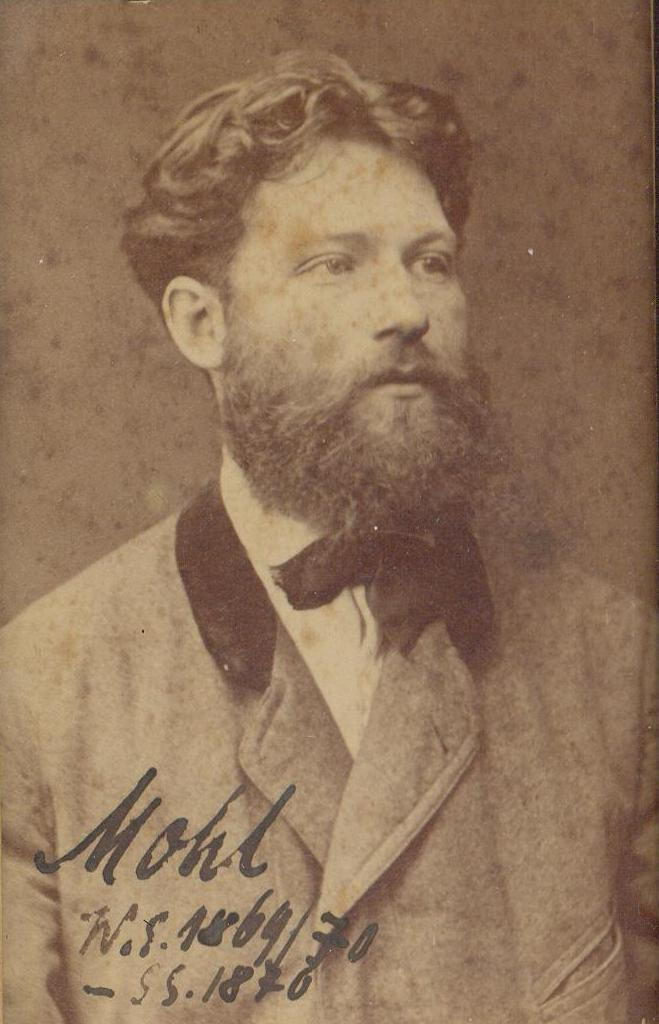
Mohl in 1870

Ernst Friedrich von Mohl (July 20, 1849 – January 8, 1929) was a German classical philologist and professor.

== Life ==
Mohl studied philosophy at the University of Tübingen and became a member of Landsmannschaft Schottland. It was during this time that he became a lifelong friend of Alexander von Zagareli. Later he studied at the University of Dorpat. From 1889 to 1911 he was professor at the Saint Petersburg Law School.

He died in Munich in 1929.
