= Mole, Karnataka =

Mole
- Village
- Location in Karnataka, India Mole (India)
- Coordinates: 16.7154°N 74.9216°E
- Country: India
- State: Karnataka
- District: Belgaum
- Talukas: Athni

Government
  - Type: Panchayat raj
  - Body: Gram panchayat

Languages
  - Official: Kannada
- Time zone: UTC+5:30 (IST)
- ISO 3166 code: IN-KA
- Vehicle registration: KA
- Website: karnataka.gov.in

Mole is a village in Belgaum district of Karnataka, India.
