= Rolf Emmrich =

German professor of internal medicine

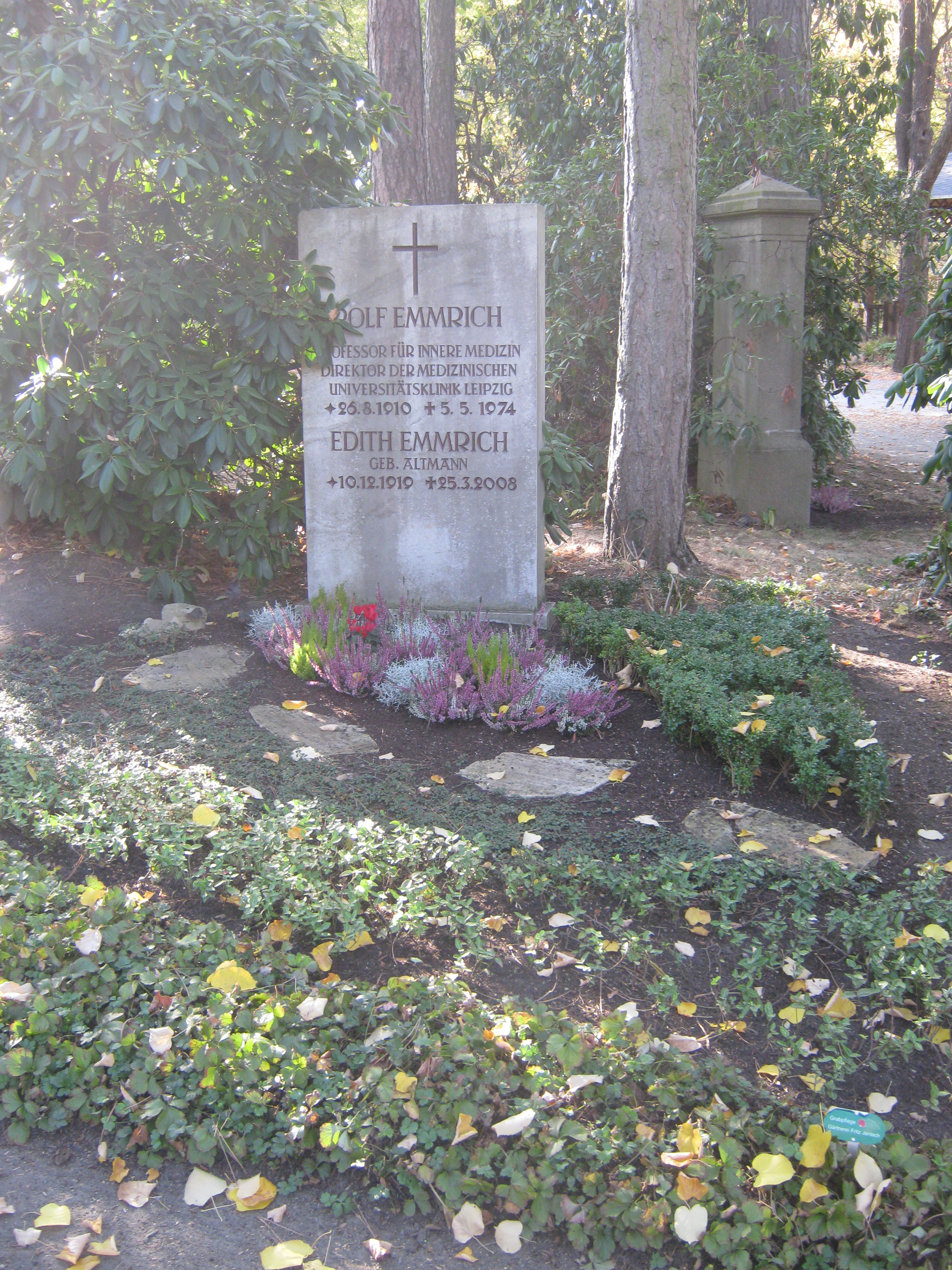
Grave.

Rolf Emmrich (27 August 1910 – 5 May 1974) was a German professor of internal medicine.

Emmrich was born in Freiberg, Saxony. He studied at the University of Tübingen and University of Freiburg (Ph.D. 1936) and subsequently held the positions of privat-docent at the University of Halle-Wittenberg in 1948. Since 1954 he was professor at the University of Leipzig. In 61 Emmrich became a member of Saxonian Academy of Sciences, in 1963 member of the Leopoldina.

In 1930 Emmrich joined the fraternity Landsmannschaft Schottland. In 1974 he died in Leipzig.
