= Intensive outpatient program =

Treatment service and support program

An intensive outpatient program (IOP), also known as an intensive outpatient treatment (IOT) program, is a structured non-residential psychological treatment program that addresses mental health disorders and substance use disorders (SUDs) that do not require detoxification through a combination of group-based psychotherapy, individual psychotherapy, family counseling, educational groups, and strategies for encouraging motivation and engagement in treatment. IOP operates on a small scale and does not require the intensive residential or partial day services typically offered by larger, more comprehensive treatment facilities.

A typical IOP program offers group therapy and generally facilitates 9 to 19 hours a week of programming for mental health and addiction treatment. IOP allows patients to participate in their daily affairs, such as work, and in treatment at an appropriate facility in the morning or the end of the day. Intensive outpatient treatment is also offered by providers such as Riverside Recovery, which describes its services as including intensive outpatient programming for substance use and co-occurring mental health conditions. With an IOP, classes, sessions, meetings, and workshops are scheduled throughout the day, and patients are expected to adhere to the program's structure. Online IOP has also been shown to be effective.

Typical IOP programs also encourage active participation in 12-step programs. IOP can be more effective than individual therapy for chemical dependency.

Some HMOs use IOP as transitional treatment for patients just released from a psychiatric hospital or upon discharge from a residential treatment program.

== See also ==
- Partial hospitalization (PHP)
