= George Edward de Mole =

George Edward de Mole (c. 1833 – 8 October 1918), often written DeMole, was a public servant in the early days of the Colony of South Australia.

== History ==
De Mole was born in England, and when a young man enlisted as a midshipman with a ship engaged 1854–55 in recovering soldiers wounded in the Crimean War.

He came to South Australia and on 6 July 1857 was appointed to the Marine Department as assistant to Captain Douglas, surveying Kangaroo Island and Backstairs Passage, and subsequently with Captain Nation, surveying the Murray Mouth, Lacepede Bay, and Rivoli Bay, completed in 1859, and Wallaroo Bay.

In June 1862 he succeeded George W. Tinkler as Secretary of the Marine Board, then on 4 July 1874 became secretary to the Minister of Education, and later also served as Commissioner of Patents. His successor at the Marine Board was George S. Wright. On 16 July 1879 he was appointed secretary to the Attorney General.

He resigned in October 1888, when C. C. Kingston was in the chair, for some private business opportunities.

He died at his home, in Malvern, South Australia.

== Family ==
George Edward de Mole married Mary Ann Louisa Perry (died 1897) on 19 September 1861. Their family included:

- Marianne Isabel "Willie" de Mole (1869–1923) married Robert de Neufville Lucas on 12 September 1900; he was assistant engineer to the Harbours Board
- Cecil Maudslay de Mole (1871 – 12 April 1919) was manager of the South British Insurance Company in Brisbane
- Fanny Elizabeth de Mole (1873 – ) married James Leslie Carstairs on 29 April 1911, later of Carnghan Station, Victoria.
- George Ernest de Mole (1880 – 7 August 1915) was killed on Gallipoli.
