= Mole (video game) =

- Developer: Off Black Creations
- Publisher: Oro Interactive
- Platform: Steam
- Release: June 15, 2026
- Genre: Psychological horror
- Mode: Single-player

Reception

Review scores
| Publication | Score |
|---|---|
| Destructoid | 9/10 |
| Bloody Disgusting | 4/5 |

Mole is a 2026 psychological horror game developed by Off Black Creations and published by Oro Interactive.

== Gameplay ==
Mole is a first-person horror game set aboard a giant drill that has been sent to investigate a "White Rabbit" signal far under the ground that is causing severe psychological effects on society above-ground. The player is the drill's navigator and interacts with various aspects of the drill's controls to keep it running and pilot it towards the signal. The player's interaction with these systems is tactile, relying on levers, knobs, and cassettes, and incorporates elements from simulation games. The game includes some chase sequences and aspects of psychological horror such as flashbacks and changing environments that symbolize themes of grief, madness and faith.

== Development and release ==
Mole was developed by Off Black Creations, a Swedish four-person studio including former 10 Chambers developers. It was published by Oro Interactive. The game was announced alongside a playable demo in January 2026. The full game was released on Steam on June 15, 2026.
