= Van Mol =

Van Mol is a surname. Notable people with the surname include:

- Charles Van Mol (1895–?), Belgian racing cyclist
- Pieter van Mol (1599–1650), Flemish painter
- Tom Van Mol (born 1972), Belgian footballer

== See also ==
- Van Mil
