= Moll (slang) =

Term for a woman with loose sexual morals

Moll, mole, or molly in Australia and New Zealand, is a usually pejorative or self-deprecating term for a woman of loose sexual morals, or a prostitute.

== Etymology and spelling ==
"Moll" derives from "Molly", used as a euphemism for "whore" or "prostitute". The Oxford English Dictionary lists the earliest usage in a 1604 quote by Thomas Middleton: "None of these common Molls neither, but discontented and unfortunate gentlewomen." The existence of the popular derivative spelling, mole, likely reflects the word's history as a spoken, rather than written, insult. Popular usage of this spelling can be seen in the name of The Comedy Company character Kylie Mole. Another example can be seen in a poem by Kevin Munro: "'That Dee will have our jobs; she's a fair dinkum mole!'". The author suggests that this spelling doesn't carry the underworld connotations of the much older moll variant.

== In popular culture ==
Puberty Blues was a 1981 movie based on the autobiographical novel by Kathy Lette and Gabrielle Carey about their experiences of being 13-year-old girls on Sydney's southern beaches. In the novel, movie and television series, girls were referred to as molls, bush pigs, top chicks, glam mags, sceggs, or grommets. The term was again popularised following the 2012 television series Puberty Blues, based on the same novel.

"Game on, molls!" became a popular catchcry in 2006, after housemate Anna Lind-Hansen used it on Australian reality television show Big Brother. It spawned a range of novelty products such as T-shirts. The phrase has since been quoted in many Australian reality television shows.

== See also ==
- Moll Flanders
- Moll King (disambiguation)
