= Ranlequin de Mol =

Dutch composer

- Occupation: Composer

Ranlequin de Mol (15th century) was a Dutch composer. His only known and performed work is a motet, Ave decus virginum, for four voices.
