= Mole (surname) =

Mole and de Mole are surnames. Notable people with these surnames include:

Mole

- Arthur Mole (1889–1983), British-born American WW1 commercial photographer
- Charles Mole (1886–1962), British architect
- Chris Mole (born 1958), UK Labour Member of Parliament
- Fenton Mole (1925–2017), American baseball player
- Jamie Mole (born 1988), English professional footballer
- Louis-Mathieu Molé (1781–1855), French statesman
- Miff Mole (1898–1961), American jazz trombonist and band leader
- Matthew Mole (born 1991), South African singer, songwriter, and musician

Fictional characters:

- Adrian Mole, fictional diarist in a series of comic novels by Sue Townsend
- Rosie Mole, Adrian's sister

de Mole

- Fanny Elizabeth de Mole (1835–1866), botanical artist of South Australia
- George Edward de Mole (1833–1918), public servant in South Australia
- Henry William de Mole (1826–1892), Australian businessman
- Lancelot Eldin de Mole (1880–1950), Australian engineer and inventor
- Violet de Mole (1874–1946), teacher of French in South Australia

Fictional characters:

- Mathilde de la Mole in The Red and the Black by Stendhal
