= Jacobus Verster =

South African military commander (1919–1981)

Lieutenant General Jacobus Pieter Verster SSA SM
- Born: 22 May 1919; Boksburg, South Africa
- Died: 1981 (aged 61–62)
- Relatives: Trudie Brits ()
- Military career
- Allegiance: South Africa
- Branch: South African Air Force
- Service years: 1939–1974
- Rank: Lieutenant General
- Nickname: Joey
- Commands: Chief of the South African Air Force
- Wars: World War II
- Awards

Lieutenant-General Jacobus Verster SSA SM (1919–1981) was a South African military commander. He joined the South African Air Force in 1936, and served in World War II. He was Chief of the Air Force from 1967 to 1975.

== Military career ==
He was educated at al Rodean High School in Swartruggens and later Pretoria University and joined the Air Force in 1936 as a student pilot.

He served in RAF Bomber Command at Hendon in World War II. He was shot down in North Africa in 1942 and was taken prisoner.

He served as Aide-de-Camp to the Governor General and the State President (1953–1962) OC SAAF College 1961–1963. He was promoted to brigadier in 1963 and served as Military, Air and Naval Attaché to London from 1963–1966. As a Major General he was appointed as GOC Air Defence Group during January to November 1967. Chief of the Air Force from December 1967 until early retirement in 1974. He died in 1981.

== Awards and decorations ==
- Star of South Africa (1952) (SSA)
- Southern Cross Medal (1952) (SM)
- 1939–45 Star
- Africa Star
- War Medal 1939–1945
- Africa Service Medal (WWII)

Military offices
Preceded by Kalfie Martin	Chief of the South African Air Force; 1967–1974	Succeeded by Robert 'Bob' Rogers
Unknown	Aide-de-Camp to the Governor General and the State President; 1953–1962	Unknown
Unknown	OC SAAF College; 1961–1973	Unknown
Unknown	Military, Air and Naval Attaché to London; 1963–1966	Unknown
Unknown	GOC Air Defence Group January to November 1967; January 1967–November 1967	Unknown

== See also ==
- List of South African military chiefs
- South African Air Force
