= Moll King =

Moll King may refer to:

- Moll King (coffee house proprietor)
- Moll King (criminal)
