= Christine De Mol =

Belgian applied mathematician

Christine De Mol (born 23 April 1954) is a Belgian applied mathematician and mathematical physicist interested in inverse problems, regularization, wavelets, and machine learning, and known for her work on proximal gradient methods and the application of proximal gradient methods for learning. She is a professor of mathematics at the Université libre de Bruxelles, and the former chair of the SIAM Activity Group on Imaging Science.

== Education ==
De Mol was educated at the Université libre de Bruxelles, earning a licence in physics in 1975 and a Ph.D. in 1979, with a dissertation Sur la régularisation des problèmes inverses linéaires under the joint supervision of Jean Reignier and Mario Bertero.

== Career ==
De Mol became a researcher for the Belgian National Fund for Scientific Research (FNRS), obtaining a permanent position there in 1981 and becoming a director of research in 1996. Meanwhile, she had obtained a habilitation from the Université libre de Bruxelles; her habilitation thesis was Super-résolution en microscopie confocale. In 1998 she gave up her position with the FNRS, becoming an honorary researcher with them, to become a full professor at the Université libre de Bruxelles. She was head of the mathematics department at the university for 2009–2010, and chair of the Society for Industrial and Applied Mathematics Activity Group on Imaging Science for 2012–2013.
