= Alexander von Zagareli =

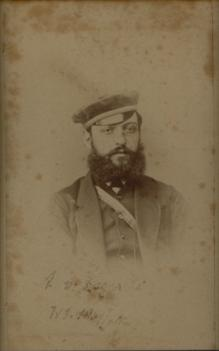
Alexander v. Zagareli

Alexander Anton von Zagareli (also Cagareli or Tsagareli, Georgian: ალექსანდრე ანტონის ძე ცაგარელი; 9 December 1844 – 12 November 1929) was a Georgian linguist. He was professor at Saint Petersburg State University and co-founder of Tbilisi State University.

Zagareli was born in Kaspi, Georgia. He studied at the University of Tübingen, the University of Vienna, the Ludwig-Maximilians-Universität München, and Saint Petersburg State University. In 1869, he became a member of Landsmannschaft Schottland. Zagareli habilitated at age 27 at the Saint Petersburg State University. There, he became a docent for Georgian Literature and later professor for Oriental Languages. Nicholas Marr was one of his most famous students. Zagareli remained at the Georgian language department at Saint Petersburg State University for over half a century, until his return to Georgia in 1922. The near 80-year-old Zagareli left Russia to take up academic positions at Tbilisi State University.

He died in Tbilisi and was interred at the Mtatsminda Pantheon.

== Honours ==
- Order of St. Stanislaus, 1st class
