= Partial hospitalization =

Mental health treatment program

Partial Hospitalization, also known as PHP (partial hospitalization program) or day treatment, is a type of program used to treat mental illness, addiction, or other serious psychological issues. In partial hospitalization, the patient continues to reside at home, but commutes to a treatment center up to seven days a week for several hours per day. Partial hospitalization focuses on the overall treatment of the individual and is intended to avert or reduce in-patient hospitalization.

The pioneer of partial hospital programs, Dr. Albert E. Moll, believed that some patients would be unable to be away from their families or from work and that these programs would reduce the cost of long-term care.

Partial hospitalization programs in the United States can be provided in either a hospital setting or by a free-standing community mental health center (CMHC). PHPs may also be offered virtually.

Treatment during a typical day may include group therapy, psych-educational groups, skill building, individual therapy, and psychopharmacological assessments and check-ins. The structure and intensity of PHPs are best suited for individuals needing a higher level of care but not requiring constant supervision. Riverside Recovery of Tampa describes relapse prevention, coping skills, and emotional regulation as topics covered in structured group therapy within its partial hospitalization program.

Programs are available for the treatment of alcoholism and substance abuse problems, Alzheimer's disease, anorexia and bulimia, depression, bipolar disorder, anxiety disorders, schizophrenia, and other mental illnesses. Programs geared specifically toward geriatric patients, adult patients, adolescents, or young children also exist. Programs for adolescents and children usually include an academic program, to either take the place of or to work with the child's local school.

== Funding ==
Service providers in the United States are funded by private insurance as part of a designated continuum of care as well as Medicare and, for some states, Medicaid.

Currently, many providers are moving the partial hospitalization model of day treatment toward more acute short-term services. Hospitals and community mental health organizations are using PHPs to handle acutely ill persons who are able to better understand their illness, become adjusted to medication regimes, develop important coping skills, and set recovery goals that enable them to function effectively as recovered individuals in the society.

Most programs are required to pass comprehensive reviews from national, state, and insurance bodies. Specific guidelines for assessment, treatment, facility maintenance, performance improvement, and client outcome studies are integral to partial hospitalization programs. The Association for Ambulatory Behavioral Healthcare is the premier national group, publishing the Standards and Guidelines for Partial Hospitalization Programs and Intensive Outpatient Programs (2024).

== See also ==
- Deinstitutionalisation
- Intensive outpatient program (IOP)
