= Moles =

Moles can refer to:

- Moles de Xert, a mountain range in the Baix Maestrat comarca, Valencian Community, Spain
- Moles (nightclub), a live music venue in Bath, Somerset
- The Moles (Australian band)
- The Moles, alter ego of Scottish band Simon Dupree and the Big Sound

== People ==
- Abraham Moles (1920–1992), French engineer
- Andy Moles (born 1961), English cricketer
- Angela Moles, New Zealand ecologist, evolutionary biologist and science communicator
- Brodie Moles (born 1985), Australian football player
- David Moles, American novelist
- Edwin Moles (1908–1969), American swimmer
- Enrique Moles Ormella (1883–1953), Spanish chemist
- Francesco Maria Moles (1638–1697), Italian Roman Catholic prelate
- Gene Moles (1928–2002), American guitarist
- Giuseppe Moles (born 1967), Italian politician
- James Moles (1884–1915), English football player
- John Moles (1949–2015), British historian
- Juan Moles (1871–1943/1945), Spanish lawyer and politician
- Margot Moles (1910–1987), Spanish athlete
- Maria Moles (born 2003), Andorran footballer
- Maria Reig Moles (born 1951), Andorran entrepreneur
- Osvaldo Moles (1913–1967), Brazilian journalist
- Pasqual Pere Moles (1741–1797), Spanish engraver
- Pere Moles (1935–2024), Andorran politician
- Pere Font Moles (1926–2025), Andorran politician
- Robert N. Moles (born 1949), British legal academic
- Thomas Moles (1871–1937), Ulster Unionist politician

== See also ==
- Mole (disambiguation)
- Molas (disambiguation)
