= Toby Moll (general) =

South African Air Force general (born 1917)

Major general Glanville Tobias Moll SM DSO
- Born: 1917
- Relatives: Charlotte Stirling (wife)
- Military career
- Allegiance: Republic of South Africa
- Service years: 1935–1972
- Rank: Major general
- Nickname: Toby
- Commands: Chief of Defence Staff; Defence Advisor to Washington, D.C.
- Wars: World War II; Korean War
- Awards: Southern Cross Medal SM Korea Medal (South Africa) Queen Elizabeth II Coronation Medal Union Medal Distinguished Service Order DSO 1939–45 Star Africa Star Italy Star War Medal 1939–1945 Africa Service Medal (WWII) United Nations Service Medal Korean War Service Medal Order of Military Merit (무공훈장)
- Other work: Chief of Staff to Chairman of ARMSCOR (Secondment)

Major-General Toby Moll SM DSO (born 1917) was a South African Chief of Defence Staff from 1 July 1966 until 30 November 1967.

== Military career ==
Moll joined the Permanent Force in 1935 and qualified as a pilot in 1936 and later became a flight commander at Central Flying School. He served in World War II in the Middle Eastern front. He was seconded to ARMSCOR as the chief of staff to the chairman from 1968–1972. He retired from the SADF in 1972.

== Awards and decorations ==
- Southern Cross Medal (1952) (SM)
- Korea Medal (South Africa)
- Queen Elizabeth II Coronation Medal
- Union Medal
- Distinguished Service Order (DSO)
- 1939–45 Star
- Africa Star
- Italy Star
- War Medal 1939–1945
- Africa Service Medal (WWII)
- United Nations Service Medal (Korea)
- Korean War Service Medal
- Order of Military Merit (무공훈장) (3rd Class - Chungmu Cordon (충무))

== See also ==
- List of South African military chiefs
- South African Air Force

Military offices
New title	Chief of Defence Staff; 1966–1967	Succeeded by Kalfie Martin
Preceded by JAB Sandenbergh	OC AFB Ysterplaat; 1946–1951	Succeeded by Kalfie Martin
