= Friedrich Moll =

German wood specialist

Friedrich Rudolf Heinrich Carl Moll (31 January 1882 – 8 May 1951) was a German wood specialist who worked on preserving wood in mines and shipping and naval applications.

== Biography ==
Moll was born in Culm, West Prussia and worked as a shipwright before training in shipbuilding at the Technische Hochschule in Berlin-Charlottenburg in 1902. He then worked on English trawlers, and in 1909, he wrote a dissertation examining the disappearance of trawlers. He examined the application of mercury chloride to preserving telephone poles. In 1920, he received a doctorate from the University of Berlin for work on fungi and their control. He then worked as a lecturer in the Technische Hochschule at Berlin-Charlottenburg from 1922 to 1936. He worked on treatments against shipworms.
