= Toby Moll =

South African rugby union player (1890–1916)

- Born: Tobias Mortimer Moll; 20 July 1890 Cape Town, South Africa
- Died: 15 July 1916 (aged 25) Bazentin-le-Petit, France
- University: South African College

Rugby union career
- Position: Forward
Amateur team(s)
| Years | Team | Apps | (Points) |
- Hamilton RFC
| – | Randfontein RFC | | |
Provincial / State sides
| Years | Team | Apps | (Points) |
| 1908–1910 | Transvaal | | |
| 1910–1914 | Western Province | | |
International career
| Years | Team | Apps | (Points) |
| 1910 | South Africa | 1 | (0) |
- Military career
- Allegiance: British Empire
- Rank: 2nd Lieutenant
- Unit: Leicestershire Regiment
- Conflicts: World War I: South West Africa Campaign; Western Front; Battle of the Somme; Battle of Bazentin Ridge †

Tobias Mortimer Moll (20 July 1890 – 15 July 1916) was a South African rugby union player from Cape Town. He was awarded a single cap for South Africa on 27 August 1910, against the British Isles team on its 1910 tour of South Africa. He played for Randfontein RFC, Transvaal, and Western Province.

In the First World War, he first served with the South African forces in the South West Africa Campaign, then travelled to England where he joined the 9th Battalion Royal Leicestershire Regiment as a Second Lieutenant. He was hit by shrapnel during the Battle of Bazentin Ridge and died from his wounds the following day. He is buried at Méricourt-l'Abbé Cemetery.

== Early life ==
Toby Moll was born on 20 July 1890 at Cape Town, Cape Province (today South Africa). He was the son of Tobias and Henrietta Moll of Potsdam, Cape Province. He was educated at South African College.

== Rugby career ==
Moll played club rugby for the Hamilton's Club, Cape Town, and was also the team captain. He played for the provincial side of Transvaal from 1908 to 1910. It was while playing for Transvaal that he earned his first and only cap for South Africa, against the British Isles team touring South Africa, on 27 August 1910 at Port Elizabeth. Later he played for Western Province from 1910 to 1914.

=== International appearance ===
| Opposition | Score | Result | Date | Venue | Ref(s) |
|---|---|---|---|---|---|
| (United Kingdom) British & Irish Lions | 3–8 | Lost | 27 August 1910 | Port Elizabeth | |

== Military service ==
At the start of the First World War, Moll first served in the South West Africa Campaign with the South African forces fighting for the British Empire against the Germans. At the conclusion of that campaign, he travelled to England and joined the 9th (Service) Battalion of the Royal Leicestershire Regiment. The 9th Battalion, as part of the 110th Infantry Brigade, was involved in the Battle of Bazentin Ridge on 14–15 July 1916, with the objective of taking Bazentin le Petit village and wood, part of the Battle of the Somme. Moll was wounded on 14 July and evacuated but died the following day. An eyewitness account of Moll's death was written by a teammate of his from Hampton's, Harold Lewis Silberbauer of Kenilworth, Cape Town, who was also serving as an officer in the Leicestershire Regiment:

We were now out of that nightmare wood in what was once a village – the village of Bazentin-le-Petit, and the day was 13 July. We had achieved our objective, and fondly believed that the Germans were on their way back to Berlin. We received orders to consolidate. The village was a shambles and nothing remotely resembling a house was to be seen. Here I came across an old friend from Hamilton's, Toby Moll, who told me that Cyril Bam had been killed. No trace of him was to be found. Soon after this, Toby was hit by shrapnel when he was quite near me and I saw at once that there was no hope. It was hard to see Toby go – everything else was impersonal, almost unreal, but with Toby one was up against it.

He is buried at Méricourt-l'Abbé Cemetery Extension (Grave II. D. 5).

== See also ==
- List of international rugby union players killed in action during the First World War
- List of South Africa national rugby union players – Springbok no. 125
