= Gerrit Moll =

Dutch scientist (1785–1838)

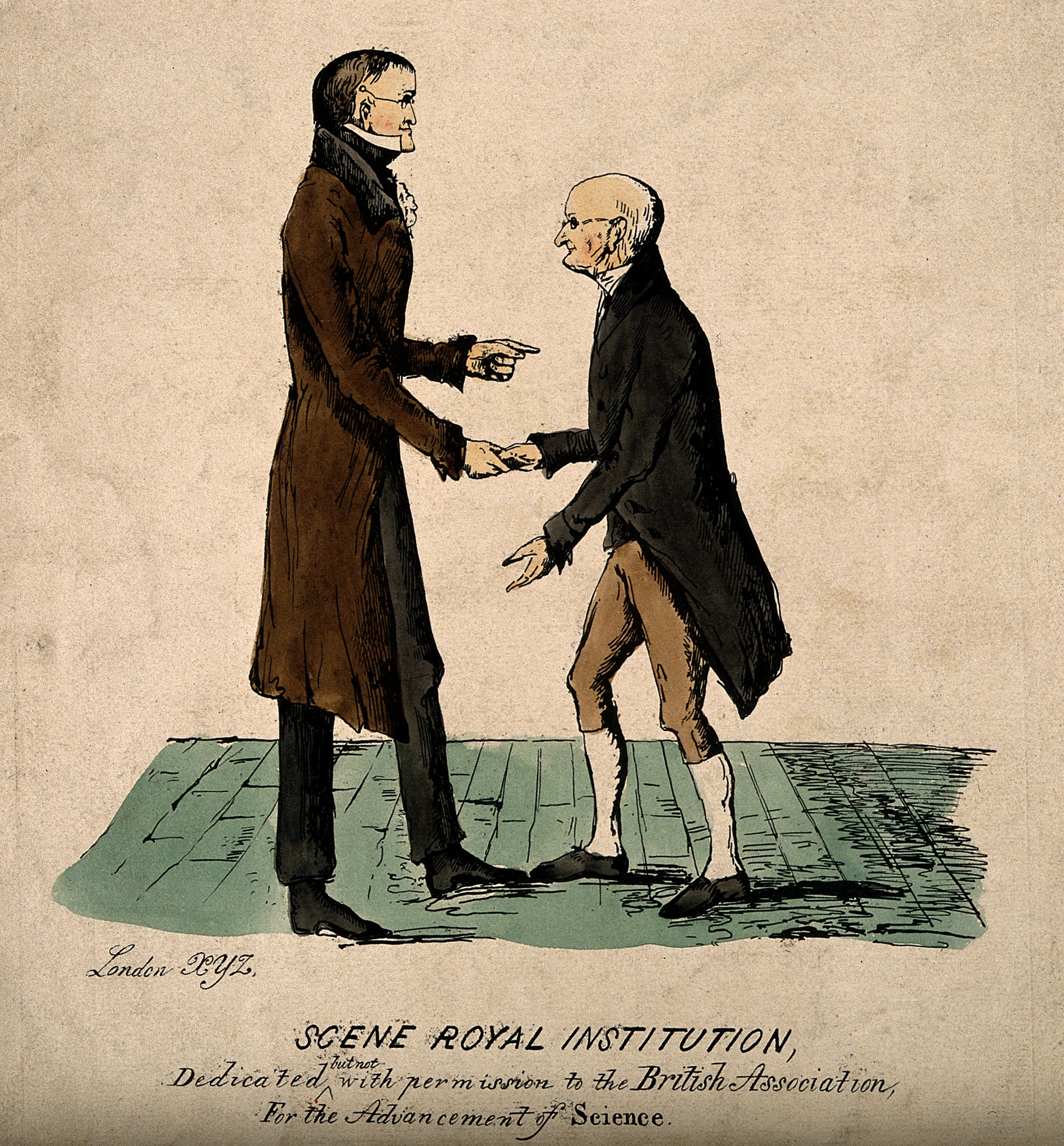
Gerrit Moll (left) shakes hands with John Dalton

Gerard "Gerrit" Moll (18 January 1785, Amsterdam – 17 January 1838, Amsterdam) was a Dutch scientist and mathematician. A polymath in his interests, he published in four languages.

== Life ==
From a family background in Amsterdam of commerce, Moll was drawn towards science. His teacher at the Athenaeum Illustre of Amsterdam was Jean Henri van Swinden. He took up astronomy with Jan Frederik Keijser in 1801. In 1809 he was awarded a Candidaat degree by Leiden University; and in 1810 he went to Paris, where he studied under Delambre. Moll is noted for his later animus against "Napoleonic science", the tradition of the revolutionary period in France.

In 1812 Moll was appointed director at Utrecht Observatory, a position he then held for 26 years; and in 1815 professor of mathematics and natural philosophy at Utrecht, receiving an honorary Ph.D. (under Johannes Theodorus Rossijn). He became member of the Royal Institute of the Netherlands in 1815.

During the "declinist" controversy in British science around 1830, Moll spoke in praise of the British tradition, against the trend of increasing professionalisation. A friend of Humphry Davy and Michael Faraday, he wrote a pamphlet On The Alleged Decline of Science in England (1831), which Faraday edited, in reply to Charles Babbage's "Reflections on the Decline of Science in England, and on Some of Its Causes (1830). In relation to claims that French scientists had tried to diminish the impact of Davy's work, Moll relayed unfounded allegations to Faraday.

Moll died of typhoid on 17 January 1838.

== Works ==
Moll developed the electromagnet of William Sturgeon, publishing with priority over Joseph Henry.
