= Albert Moll (Canadian psychiatrist) =

Canadian psychiatrist (1906–1996)

Albert Edward Moll (1906 – February 8, 1992) was a Canadian psychiatrist who pioneered the day treatment of psychiatric patients.

== Biography ==
Born in Italy as the son of a British silk broker, Moll was educated at McGill University, earning a degree in law in 1932 before studying medicine, receiving his M.D. in 1937. He became the Chief Psychiatrist at the Allan Memorial Institute and Chief of Staff at the Montreal General Hospital, establishing the first inpatient psychiatric unit there. Moll lectured at McGill where he was considered one of the leading academic psychiatrists at the time.

Besides his work in day treatment options in the treatment of psychiatric patients he also espoused a night treatment option.

== Personal life ==
Dr. Moll was married to a nurse, Patricia Mary Anthony Moll (née Moore). They had twin daughters Joan and Jill.
