= Landsmannschaft Zaringia Heidelberg =

German student corps

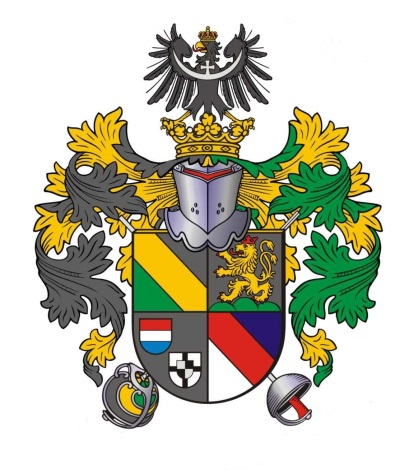
- Founded: November 19, 1880; 145 years ago
- Type: Studentenverbindung
- Affiliation: Triple Alliance
- Status: Active
- Scope: Local
- Motto: Amico pectus, hosti frontem "The chest of the friend, the forehead of the enemy!"
- Colors: Black, Green and Gold
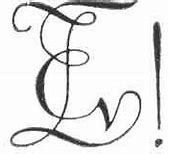
- Zirkel
- Chapters: 1
- Headquarters: Schloßberg 9, 69117; Heidelberg, Baden-Württemberg; Germany
- Website: www.zaringia.de

The Landsmannschaft Zaringia Heidelberg is a German fraternity – not to be confused with the American variety – situated in Heidelberg, a university city in south-western Germany. It is a brotherhood of students and alumni mainly of University of Heidelberg, with membership being a lifelong commitment.

== History ==
Today's Landsmannschaft Zaringia Heidelberg emerged from a merger of the original Zaringia with the connections to Landsmannschaft Cheruskia and Landsmannschaft Vandalia.

=== Zaringia Heidelberg ===
The namesake of the association is the noble family the Zähringer. Zaringia was founded in the winter semester of 1882/83 as the "Tischgesellschaft Pfalz-Kraichgau" in the Heidelberg "Essighaus". On February 8, 1888, the "Kraichgauer Gesellschaft" was established under the name “Zaringia” as a beating connection with the colors red-white-light blue, whereupon in 1903 they became a member of the "Coburg Landsmannschafter Convent".

=== Cheruskia Heidelberg ===
Cheruskia emerged from the "New Philological Association", which was constituted on November 19, 1880. In 1888 the colors red-black-gold were chosen and in 1894 the name "Cheruskia" was adopted. Since the summer semester of 1904, they called themselves "Scientific Association Cheruskia". The first Mensuren were beaten in 1906, two years later it was decided to convert it into a Landsmannschaft with the Heidelberg city colors black, gold, green and a green cap; again a year later, it was accepted into the "Coburg Landsmannschafter Convent".

=== Vandalia Breslau ===
As the original “Pharmaceutical Association” at the University of Wrocław, Vandalia has also gone from a scientific association to a weapons student corporation. Founded in 1859, the association soon sought the status of a student association with the colors blue-red-green. In 1887, the name "Vandalia" was adopted and the association was established. Four years later it was accepted into the “Coburg Landsmannschafter Convent”. Shortly before 1914, the colors were changed and from then on they wore blue-red-white ribbons, one green one percussion exhibited.

=== Mergers ===
The Landsmannschaft Vandalia merged in 1925 with the German-Academic Association Baltia. The now yellow percussion of the Landsmannschaft Vandalia band and the Baltic Cross, which was added to the federal coat of arms, were considered to be signs of the merger. The Landsmannschaft Zaringia Heidelberg and Landsmannschaft Cheruskia merged in Heidelberg in 1919. The white became the green Zaringia because the new alliance took over the ribbon and cap as well as the date of foundation and the alliance song from the old Landsmannschaft Cheruskia. In the summer semester of 1919, the new Landsmannschaft acquired the house at Schloßberg 9, on the first floor of which Zaringia, as a long-term tenant, had already enjoyed residence rights for more than two decades and which is still owned by the Zaringia to this day.

Landsmannschaft Vandalia, which had moved into its second house in Breslau a few years earlier, dissolved itself in 1936, as did Landsmannschaft Zaringia in Heidelberg, in order not to have to join the National Socialist German Students' League. To be able to survive, both groups opened their houses to a National Socialist comradeship (in Heidelberg it was called "Kurpfalz", in Breslau "Lützow"). After they met again for the first time in May 1948, the 90th foundation festival was celebrated in Heidelberg a year later, which was to become the new home of the “Landsmannschaft Vandalia-Breslau zu Heidelberg”. At the same time, Zaringia was also reconstituted. There had been a similar collection campaign there too, to venture a fresh start.

Landsmannschaft Zaringia and Landsmannschaft Vandalia have spent the years since 1949 nearby. Landsmannschaft Vandalia initially acquired its third corporate house on Handschuhsheimer Landstrasse in Heidelberg in 1955. The close relationships between the two fraternities ultimately resulted in a merger, which was carried out on October 22, 1983, at a joint commission. Since then, the former Landsmannschaft Vandals have been wearing Zaringia colors and hats in their old hue.

L! Zaringia is part of the Triple Alliance with the Landsmannschaft Spandovia zu Berlin and the Landsmannschaft Darmstadtia zu Gießen within the Coburger Convent.

== Symbols ==
=== Name ===
Zaringia is the Latinized form of the name of the princely family of the Zähringer. The full name of the Landsmannschaft Zaringia is "Landsmannschaft Zaringia Heidelberg vereinigt mit Vandalia Breslau zu Heidelberg im Coburger Convent der akademischen Landsmannschaften und Turnerschaften an deutschen Hochschulen". The members, like the whole corporation, are called “Die Zähringer”.

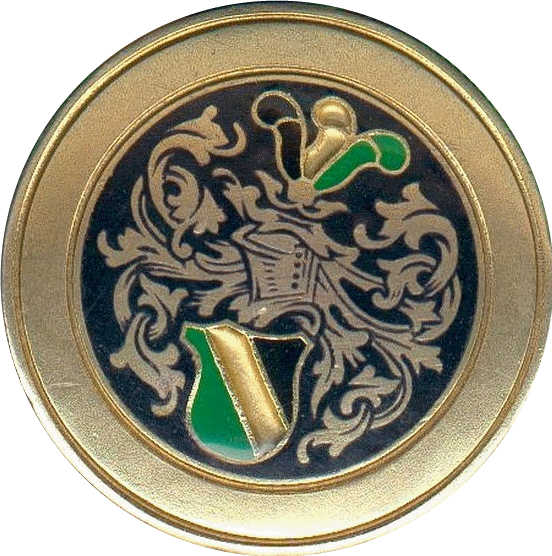
Ribbon button L! Zaringia

=== Colors ===
The Landsmannschaft Zaringia wear a Mensur with the colors black, gold and green based on the Heidelberg city coat of arms, with the edges sewn with metallic golden thread, referred to as "perkussion", as a Burschenband. The Fuchsband is gold and green, also with gold perkussion. The Zähringer wear a dark green student hat in Heidelberg format with black, gold and green.

Since the merger with the Landsmannschaft Vandalia Breslau zu Heidelberg in 1983, the Studentenverbindung wear the Pan-Slavic colors blue, red and white Vandal-Band as color with silver percussion above and gold perkussion below, as well as the former members of the Landsmannschaft Vandalia. Furthermore, you are allowed to do that Mensur as a Bursche, a volunteer putting additional Mensur on his hat.

=== Motto ===
The motto of the fraternity is "Amico pectus, hosti frontem"! (English: "The chest of the friend, the forehead of the enemy!")

== Activities ==
Mensur dueling is conducted in the weapon ring of the Heidelberg Interest Group for Compulsory Connections (Heidelberger Interessengemeinschaft der schlagenden Verbindungen (HIG)). The specialty of the second Mensur is that it must be fought "deeply". If a Mensur cannot be found in the HIG, a Mensur outside of it is searched for due to membership in the Andernach working group, which means that Mensur with Kösener connections are beaten.

== Chapter house ==
The chapter house of the fraternity is called a Zähringerhouse. First, in 1898, only the first floor of what was the name "Diemerei" was rented as a constant. As a corporation house, the house at Schloßberg 9 in Heidelberg's old town has been owned by Landsmannschaft Zaringia Heidelberg since 1919. It has seve rooms. In 2014, renovations mainly of the exterior facade was completed for around 1.3 million euros.

== Notable members ==
- Eduard Reichenow, protozoologist
- Bernhard Schmidt, microbiologist
