= Mittelschüler-Kartellverband =

Austrian fraternal umbrella organisation

- MKV
- Founded: 9 September 1933; 93 years ago Vienna, Austria
- Type: Umbrella
- Affiliation: EKV
- Status: Active
- Emphasis: Catholic studentenverbindung
- Scope: National
- Pillars: Religio, Patria, Scientia, Amicitia
- Colors: Red, White and Red
- Chapters: 160+ fraternities
- Members: 20,000+ active
- Headquarters: Neubaugasse 25/21; Wien A-1070; Austria
- Website: www.mkv.at

The Mittelschüler-Kartell-Verband der katholischen farbentragenden Studentenkorporationen Österreichs or simply Mittelschüler-Kartellverband (MKV) (English: MKV Middle School Cartel Association) is an Austrian umbrella organisation of Catholic male student fraternities (Studentenverbindung). It was founded in 1933.

In contrast to umbrella organizations like, for example, the Cartellverband der katholischen deutschen Studentenverbindungen, the fraternities of the MKV do not consist of students from universities but from the upper levels of Austrian grammar schools.

Every member of a fraternity in the MKV wears a ribbon as well as a specific cap, whose shape may vary according to the corporation, either colored in the fraternity's colours. Most commonly every corporation uses three specific colours.

Currently, more than 20,000 students or former students are members of more than 160 fraternities in the MKV.

As the MKV was founded upon the federalistic principle, these fraternities are organized in nine provincial sub-organizations according to the official Austrian federal provinces.

== Principles ==
Every fraternity of the MKV has to be founded upon four principles:

- religio: the fraternity and all its members publicly adhere to the Roman Catholic faith;
- scientia: the pursuit of an academic education is common to all of its members;
- amicitia: a lifelong friendship between all the members of the fraternity as long as they live;
- patria: patriotism towards Austria within a European context.

The fraternities of the Cartellverband historically do not practice academic fencing (Mensur) because it was forbidden by the Roman Catholic Church. The fraternities only accept men into the organization.

== Relations ==
The MKV itself is a member of the Europäischer Kartellverband (EKV), a European umbrella organization. The MKV has friendly relations with other umbrella organizations that are members of the Europäischer Kartellverband (EKV), especially with the Cartellverband der katholisch österreichischen Studentenverbindungen (ÖCV).

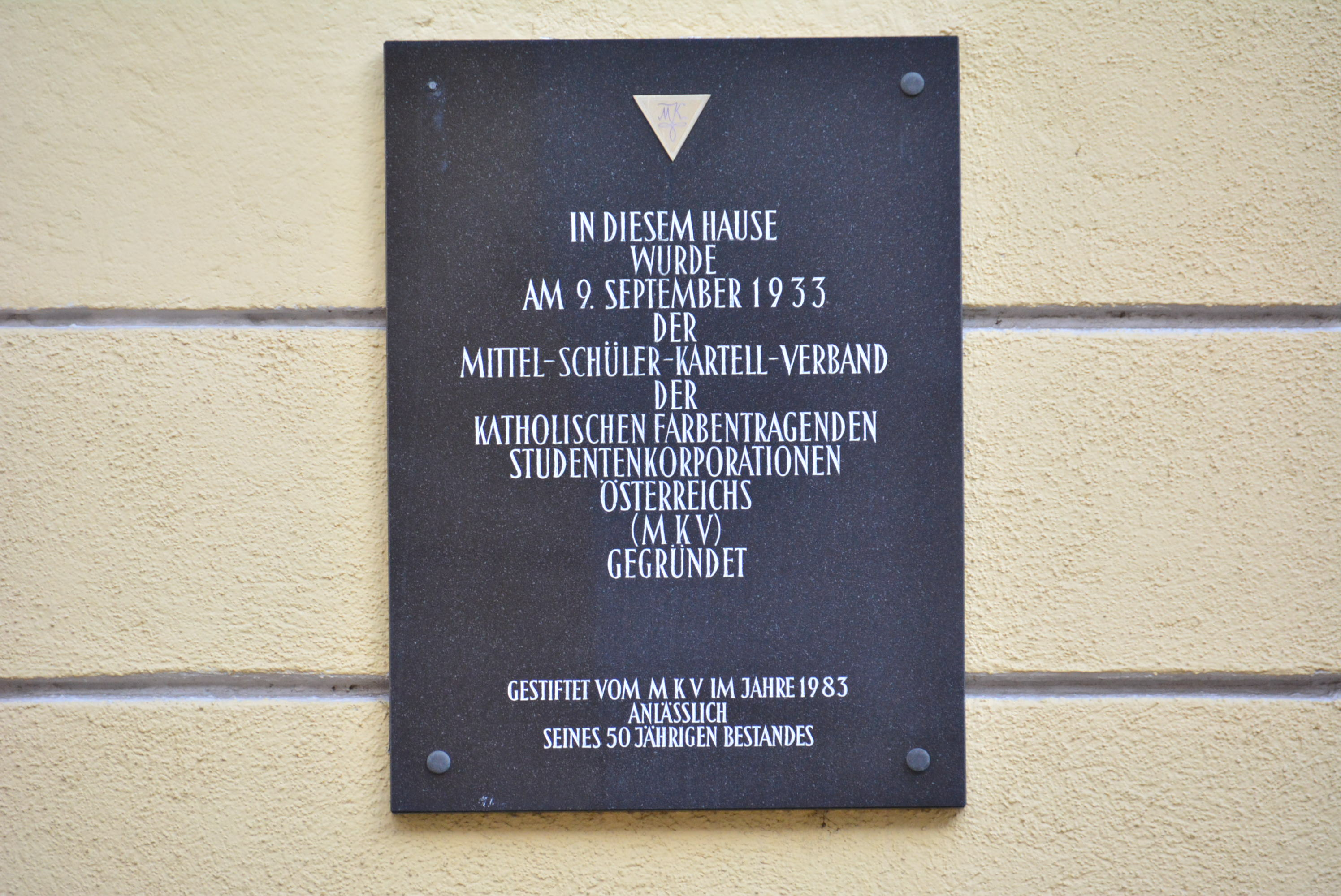
Commemorative plaque of the foundation of MKV in Viena XIX., Döblinger Hauptstrasse 76

== See also ==
- Burschenschaft
- Cartellverband
- Landsmannschaft
- Turnerschaft
