= Coburger Convent =

German association of student fraternal groups

- CC
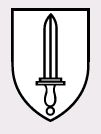
- Founded: May 12, 1951; 74 years ago Coberg, Bavaria, Germany
- Type: Umbrella
- Affiliation: Independent
- Status: Active
- Emphasis: Studentenverbindung
- Scope: Austria and Germany
- Pillars: Honor, Freedom, Friendship, and Fatherland
- Colors: White, Green, Red, and White
- Publication: CC Das Magazin
- Chapters: 91
- Members: 1,500+ active 11,000+ lifetime
- Formal name: Coburger Convent der akademischen Landsmannschaften und Turnerschaften an deutschen Hochschulen
- Headquarters: Triftstraße 1 Munich, Bavaria 80538; Germany
- Website: www.coburger-convent.de

Coburger Convent der akademischen Landsmannschaften und Turnerschaften an deutschen Hochschulen (abbreviation: CC) is an association of German and Austrian studentenverbindungen. Its membership includes 91 student associations who all participate in academic fencing.

== History ==
Coburger Convent was founded in Coburg, Bavaria, Germany on May 12, 1951 as a trade association for studentenverbindungen or student fraternal corporations. It formed from the merger of the German Regional Association and the Representative Convention; these were Landsmannschafter and Turnerschafter gymnastics associations at German universities.

Coburger Convent held its first nationwide conference in Berlin in 1952; this was held jointly with the German Sängerschaft (now Austrian Landsmannschafter-und Turnerschafter-Convent which is a CC member corporation). This conference continues as the annual Greifenstein Conference held in Bad Blankenburg, Germany.

As of 2024, Coburger Convent includes 91 corporations in Germany and Austria, consisting of 1,500+ male students and 9,500+ alumni members. It consists of both Landsmannschaften and Turnerschaften student corporations. Each member corporation has a meeting house. Their only membership requirement is to be a student of the corporation's university. Alumni members of the corporations belong to the Association of Old Gentlemen of the Coburger Convent.

Coburger Convent's headquarters are located in Munich, Germany. Its publication is CC Das Magazin.

== Symbols and traditions ==
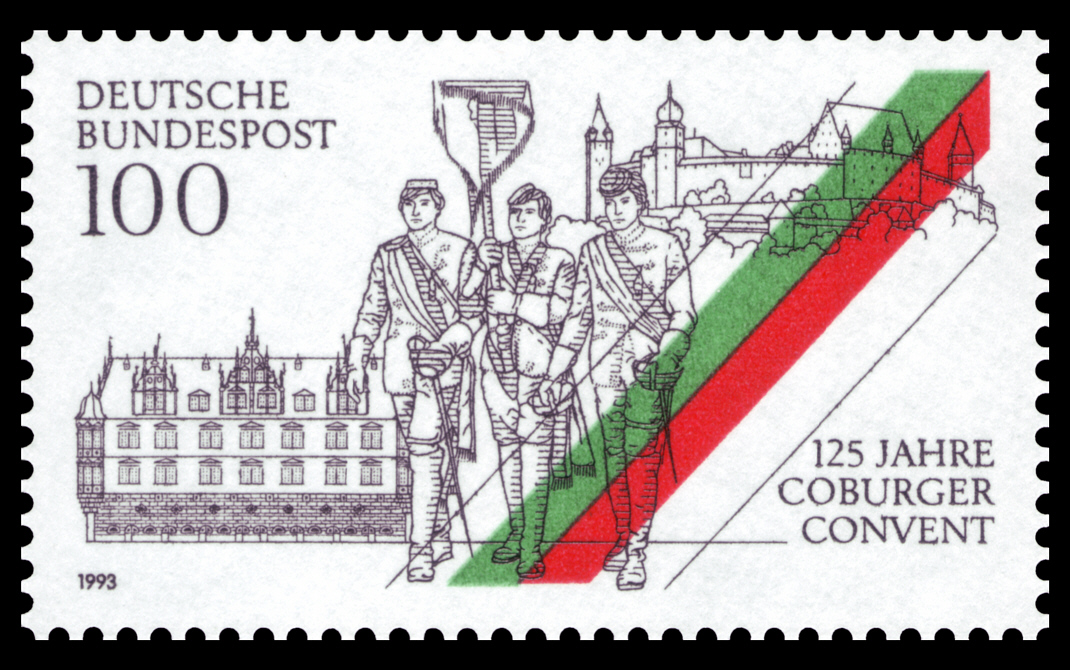
Commemorative postal stamp showing the CC colors

Coburger Convent's principles or pillars of the association are honor, freedom, friendship, and fatherland. One of the main tradition of the CC studentenverbindungen is participation in compulsory academic fencing.

Its student members wear couleur or ribbons to indicate affiliation. Its couleur are white-green-red-white. For major events, student members wear colored hats, based on school traditions from the 19th century.

New members are called foxes. Regular student members are called Burschen. Graduates or alumni are called Old Boys.

== Notable members ==
A selection of notable members of the studentenverbindungen of Coburger Convent:

- Karl von Bardeleben (1849–1919), Anatomist
- Peter Harry Carstensen (born 1947), Politician, since 2005 he has been Minister-President of the state of Schleswig-Holstein, serving as President of the Bundesrat in 2005/06
- Thomas Dehler (1897–1967), Politician, Federal Republic of Germany's first Minister of Justice (1949–1953) and chairman of Free Democratic Party (1954–1957)
- Rolf Emmrich (1910–1974), Professor of internal medicine.
- Adolph Albrecht Erlenmeyer (1822–1877), Physician and psychiatrist
- Friedrich Albrecht Erlenmeyer (1849–1926), Physician and psychiatrist
- Franz Etzel (1902–1970), Politician, Minister of Finance.
- Paul Flechsig (1847–1929), Neuroanatomist, psychiatrist and neuropathologist
- Carl Friedrich Goerdeler (1884–1945), Politician
- Levin Goldschmidt (1828–1897), Jurist
- Otto Hahn (1879–1968), Chemist and Nobel laureate, a pioneer in the fields of radioactivity and radiochemistry
- Hugo Junkers (1859–1935), Engineer
- Friedrich August Kekulé von Stradonitz (1829–1896), Organic chemist
- Friedrich August Körnicke (1828–1908), Agronomist and botanist
- Hermann Löns (1866–1914), Journalist and writer
- Gottfried Münzenberg (born 1940), Physicist
- Günther Oettinger (born 1953), Politician, Minister-President of the state of Baden-Württemberg between 2005 and 2010
- Ferdinand Sauerbruch (1875–1951), Surgeon
- Ferdinand Schneider (1911–1984), Chemist
- Wilhelm Solf (1862–1936), Scholar, diplomat, jurist, and statesman
- Heinrich Spoerl (1887–1955), Author
- Theodor Thierfelder (1824–1904), Internist
- Wilhelm Trübner (1851–1917), Painter
- Rainer Wieland (born 1957), Politician and Member of the European Parliament
- Max Wilms (1867–1918), Pathologist and surgeon
- Alexander von Zagareli (1844–1929), Professor at St. Petersburg University and co-founder of Tbilisi State University
