= Dueling scar =

Facial scars left by the sport of academic fencing

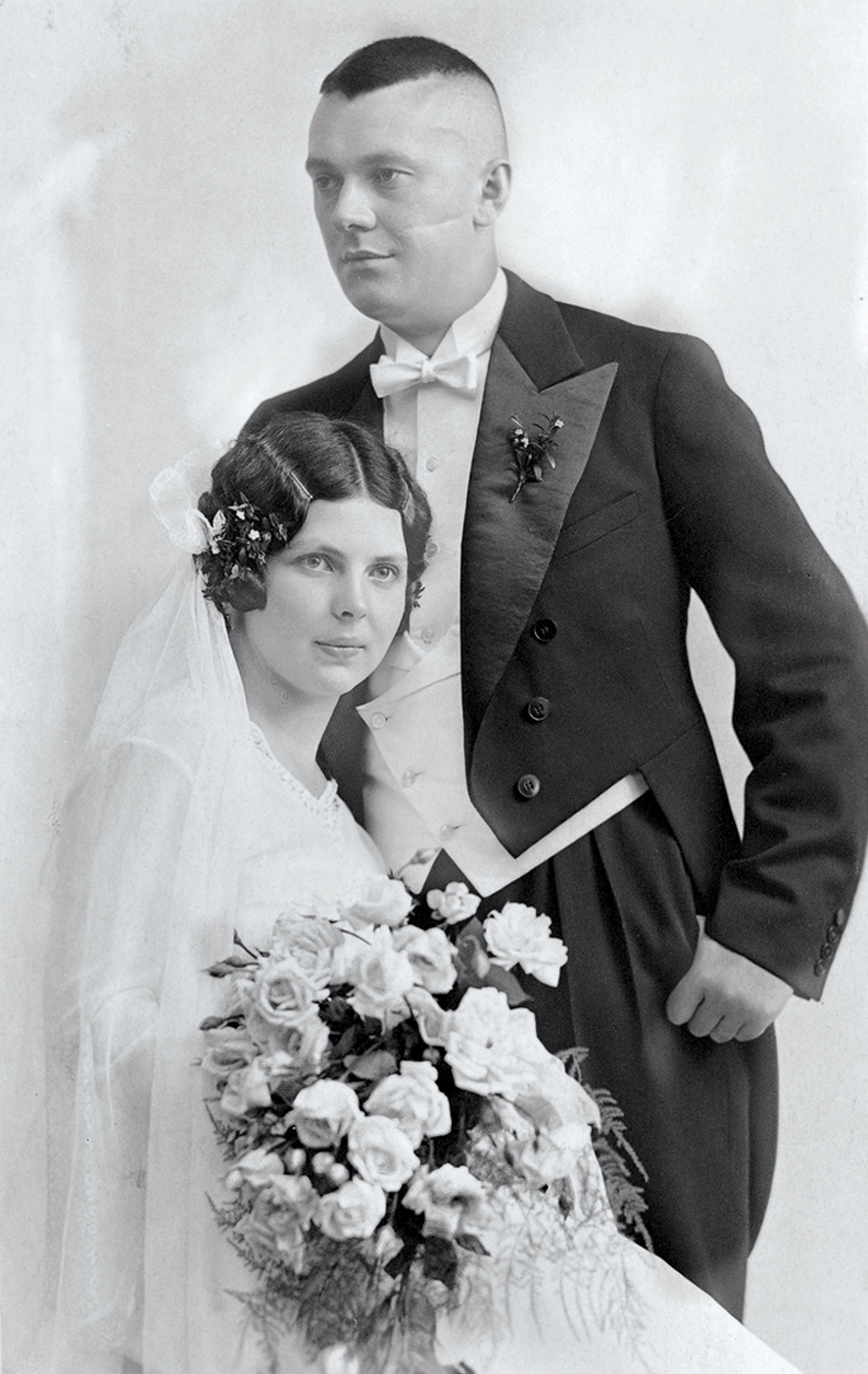
Aenne and Franz Burda, 9 July 1931. In the nineteenth and early twentieth centuries, dueling scars were seen as a badge of honor in Germany and Austria, making their owners "good husband material".

Dueling scars (German: Schmiss) have been seen as a "badge of honour" since as early as 1825. Known variously as "Mensur scars", "the bragging scar", "smite", "Schmitte", or "Renommierschmiss", dueling scars were popular amongst upper class Germans and Austrians involved in academic fencing at the start of the 20th century. Being a practice amongst university students, it was seen as a mark of their class and honour, due to the status of dueling societies at German and Austrian universities at the time. The practice of dueling and the associated scars was also present to some extent in the German military.

== History ==
Foreign tourists visiting Germany in the late 19th century were shocked to see the students, generally with their Studentcorps (Student Corps), at major German universities such as Heidelberg, Bonn, or Jena with facial scars – some older, some more recent, and some still wrapped in bandages.

The sport of academic fencing at the time was very different from modern fencing using specially developed swords. The so-called Mensurschläger (or simply Schläger, 'hitter') existed in two versions. The most common weapon was the Korbschläger with a basket-type guard. In some universities in the eastern part of Germany, the so-called Glockenschläger was in use; it was equipped with a bell-shaped guard. The individual duels between students, known as Mensuren, were somewhat ritualised. In some cases, protective clothing was worn, including padding on the arm and an eye guard.

The culture of dueling scars was mainly common in Germany and Austria, to a lesser extent some Central European countries and briefly at places such as Oxford, and some other elite universities. German military laws permitted men to wage duels of honor until World War I. During the Third Reich the Mensur was prohibited at all universities following the party line.

Within the duel, it was seen as ideal and a way of showing courage to be able to stand and take the blow, as opposed to inflicting the wound. It was important to show one's dueling prowess, but also that one was capable of taking the wound that was inflicted.

== Social significance ==
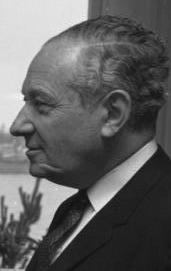
Attorney Curt Silberman showing an old dueling scar on his jaw (1967)

As the scars were gained in this particular elite social context, associated with status and an academic institution, the scars showed that one had courage and also was "good husband material". The dueling scars, while obvious, were not so serious as to leave a person disfigured or bereft of facial features. The scars were even judged by Otto von Bismarck to be a sign of bravery, and men's courage could be judged "by the number of scars on their cheeks".

Minority groups in Germany also indulged in the practice, some seeing it as an aid in their social situation. In 1874, William Osler, then a medical student on a visit to Berlin, described "one hopeful young Spanish American of my acquaintance who has one half of his face – they are usually on the left half – laid out in the most irregular manner, the cicatrices running in all directions, enclosing areas of all shapes, the relics of fourteen duels."

== Nature of the scars ==
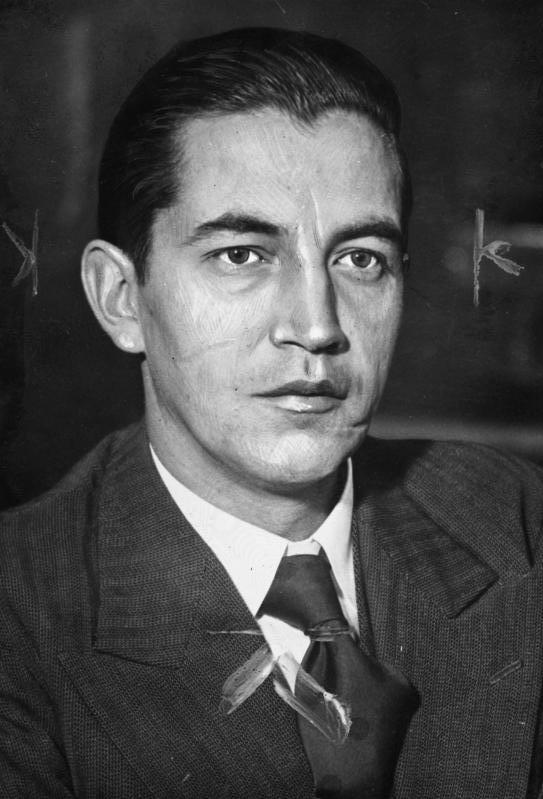
Rudolf Diels, co-founder and head of the Gestapo from 1933 to 1934

Because Mensur swords are wielded with one hand and most fencers are right-handed, Mensur scars were usually targeted to the left profile, so the right profile appeared untouched. Experienced fencers, who had fought many bouts, often accumulated an array of scars. A duelist who died in 1877 "fought no less than thirteen duels but had 137 scars on the head, face and neck".

The wounds were generally not that serious, "wounds causing, as a rule, but temporary inconvenience and leaving in their traces a perpetual witness of a fight well fought. The hurts, save when inflicted in the nose, lip, or ear, are not even necessarily painful, and unless the injured man indulges too freely in drink, causing them to swell and get red, very bad scars can be avoided. The swords used are so razor-like that they cut without bruising so that the lips of the wounds can be closely pressed, leaving no great disfigurement, such, for example, as is brought about by the loss of an ear."

Sometimes, students who did not fence would scar themselves with razors in imitation, and some would pull apart their healing cuts to exacerbate the scars, although this was generally frowned upon. Others paid doctors to slice their cheeks. The number and extremity of scars was reduced in the later years of the practice and virtually does not exist anymore in modern Germany, and the custom of obtaining dueling scars started to die off after the Second World War.

== Modern day ==
Roughly 400 fencing fraternities (Studentenverbindungen) exist today and most of them are grouped into umbrella organizations such as the Corps, Landsmannschaft or the Deutsche Burschenschaft (DB) in the Federal Republic of Germany, Austria, Switzerland and several other European nations. Their traditions include academic fencing and dueling scars.

== Notable persons ==
- Gustav Stresemann
- Caesar Rudolf Boettger
- Curt Silberman
- Fritz-Dietlof von der Schulenburg
- Theodor Haubach
- Ernst Kaltenbrunner
- Heinz Reinefarth
- Kurt Debus
- Helmuth Brückner
- Otto Skorzeny
- Rudolf Diels
- Karl Eberhard Schöngarth
- Henning Schulte-Noelle
- Thomas Strobl
- Ulrich Wetzel
- Georg Diederichs
- Heinrich Homann
