= Bund Chilenischer Burschenschaften =

Confederation of German-Chilean student associations

- BCB
- Founded: May 30, 1966; 59 years ago Limache, Chile
- Type: Umbrella
- Affiliation: Independent
- Status: Active
- Emphasis: Burschenschaft
- Scope: National
- Chapters: 5
- Headquarters: Chile
- Website: www.bcb.cl

The Bund Chilenischer Burschenschaften (BCB, English: Association of Chilean Fraternities) is a confederation of German-Chilean student associations founded in 1966. Its purpose is to promote German customs and language. The Burschenschaft is a form of student society founded in Germany in 1815.

== History ==
The Burschenschaft, plural Burschenschaften, is a student association or Studentenverbindungen founded in Germany in 1815. Unlike other Studentenverbindungen, they are non-dueling and do not wear couleur.

In Chile, Burschenschaften began in 1866 with the foundation of the Burschenschaft Araucania in Santiago. The German professor Max Westenhofer describes in his memoirs the student associations of the descendants of the Germans who began immigrating to Chile in 1843. A Burschenschaft brings together students and university graduates who preserve the German culture and language, the vast majority of whom are ethnic Germans of Chilean nationality.

The idea behind the confederation of German-Chilean fraternities came from Wilhelm Hansen, a member of Burschenschaft Montania who was studying in Germany in 1964, who felt that the Delegates’ Convention of Chilean Fraternities (DCCF) created in March 1960, needed improvement.

The Bund Chilenischer Burschenschaften (English: Association of Chilean Fraternities) was founded on May 30, 1966, at a meeting of DCCF, by Burschenschaft Araucania, Burschenschaft Montania, and Burschenschaft Andinia. It is a confederation of German-Chilean student associations that strives is to promote German customs and language. Burschenschaft Montania served as the executive fraternity.

Burschenschaft Ripuaria and Burschenschaft Vulkania joined the Bund Chilenischer Burschenschaften on October 15, 1966. These five Chilean Burschenschaften continue as members of Bund Chilenischer Burschenschaften. The leadership and headquarters of BCB rotates between its member organizations on an annual basis.

== Members ==
The founding documents of Bund Chilenischer Burschenschaften specify that its member fraternities must consist of individuals who are students at a state-recognized university and are of German descent and are fluent in German. On October 30, 1976, those guidelines were changed to make the German ancestry optional and to add a requirement to pass German examination prepared by the Goethe-Institut. The five German-Chilean student associations that makeup Bund Chilenischer Burschenschaften are as follows.

Name	Date joined	Location	References
Burschenschaft Andinia	May 30, 1966	Santiago, Chile	
Burschenschaft Araucania	May 30, 1966	Santiago, Chile	
Burschenschaft Montania	May 30, 1966	Concepción, Chile	
Burschenschaft Ripuaria	October 15, 1966	Valparaíso, Chile	
Burschenschaft Vulkania	October 15, 1966	Valdivia, Chile	
