= List of Greek letter umbrella organizations =

Greek letter umbrella organizations provide a coordinated system of college fraternities and sororities in the United States and Canada. This is a list of national umbrella councils, governing associations, and trade associations for college fraternities and sororities.

== Active ==
=== North America ===
- Association of College Honor Societies (ACHS) – coordinated body and certifying organization for collegiate honors societies
- Coalition of Black Business Sororities – coalition of four Black business sororities
- Concilio Interfraternitario de Puerto Rico – an umbrella council for the seven oldest Puerto Rican fraternities and sororities
- Concilio Interfraternitario Puertorriqueño de la Florida (Puerto Rican Interfraternity Council of Florida) (CIPFI) - council formed by the five largest fraternities from Puerto Rico with chapters in Florida
- Fraternity Leadership Association — association of fraternities who largely resigned from membership in the North-American Interfraternity Conference.
- National African American Greek Letter Association (NAAGLA)
- National APIDA Panhellenic Association (NAPA) – association of the largest and most established Asian Greek lettered organizations
- National Association of Latino Fraternal Organizations (NALFO) - association formed in 1998 by twenty of the largest and most established Latino Greek lettered organizations
- National Interfraternity Music Council (NIMC) – annual gathering of the presidents of seven music fraternities and sororities
- National Multicultural Greek Council (NMGC) – association formed in 1988 by eleven of the largest and most established Multicultural Greek lettered organizations
- National Non-Collegiate Greek Letter Organization Alliance
- National Pan-Hellenic Council (NPHC) – association formed in 1930 by the nine largest and most established Black Greek lettered organizations, the "Divine Nine"
- National Panhellenic Conference (NPC) – association formed by 26 national Greek lettered sororities and women's fraternities</ref>
- North American Interfraternity Conference (NIC) – trade association of 58 national and international fraternities
- Professional Fraternity Association (PFA) - association of 36 national collegiate professional, service and honor fraternities that formed in 1978 with the merger of the Professional Interfraternity Conference (PIC) and Professional Panhellenic Association (PPA) in compliance with Title IX
- Tau Kappa Phi Incorporated (TKPhi) – organization formed by five national LGBTQ+ friendly Greek lettered sororities and fraternities
- United Council of Christian Fraternities and Sororities (UCCFS) – council formed in 2006 by five Christian fraternities and sororities
- United Federation of Military Greek Organizations (TUFMGO) – council formed in 2017 by four military fraternities and sororities
- United Sorority and Fraternity Council – governing body for cultural-based fraternities and sororities that was established in 2000

=== Other countries ===
- Bund Chilenischer Burschenschaften – confederation of German-Chilean non-dueling student associations that was established in 1966
- Coburger Convent (CC) – association of German and Austrian studentenverbindungen that was established in 1951
- Inter Fraternity Council of France (IFCF) – alliance formed in 2009 from two fraternities and one sorority in France
- Marburger Konvent (Marburg Convention of Student Associations) (MK) – an association of gymnastics clubs founded in 1971 in Germany
- National Chamber of Associations, (De Landelijke Kamer van Verenigingen, LKvV) – organization of 46 student social associations in the Netherlands that was established in 1967
- Neue Deutsche Burschenschaft (New Germany Fraternity) (NDB) – association formed in 1996 by seven German burschenschaft
- Schwarzburgbund (Schwarzburg League) – association of non-dueling Christian fraternities from German-speaking countries that was established in 1887
- Unitas-Verband (Association of Scientific Catholic Student Associations) (UV) – organization of several German Catholic fraternities and sororities that was established in 1855

=== Related professional associations ===
- Association of Fraternity/Sorority Advisors (AFA) – community established in 1976 for professionals who work with collegiate fraternities and sororities
- Fraternity Communication Association – formed as the College Fraternity Editors Association (CFEA) in 1923, this professional association of fifty fraternities and sororities present annual awards for writing, design, and communications
- Fraternal Executives Association (FEA) – professional association of fraternity and sorority executives

== Defunct ==
Following is a list of defunct national umbrella councils and trade associations for fraternities and sororities.

=== Cultural ===
- Asian Greek Alliance (AGA) – previously was the Asian Green Association and became the National Asian Greek Alliance
- Asian Greek Association (AGA) – alliance of nine Asian and Pacific Islander fraternities and sororities that was established in 2004. Changed its name to National Asian Alliance
- Concilio Nacional de Hermandades Latinas (CNHL) - organized in 1996, CNHL merged with the National Association of Latino Fraternal Organizations in 2000
- Latino Fraternal Council (LFC) – organization of five Latino fraternities that withdrew from CNHL or NALFO, lasting from June 2000 to June 2001
- Latino Fraternal Caucus (LFC) – caucus organized within the North-American Interfraternity Conference in 2001 by its four Latino fraternity members
- National Asian Greek Alliance (NAGA) – previously was the Asian Greek Alliance. Became the National Asian Greek Council
- National Asian Greek Council (NAGC) – created from the renaming of the Asian Greek Association in 2005 and changed its name to National APIA Panhellenic Association (NAPA) in 2006

=== Professional ===
- Association of Pedagogical Sororities (APS) – organized in 1916 and changed its name to Association of Educational Sororities at its third biennial conference
- Association of Education Sororities (AES) – created as the Association of Educational Sororities from the renaming of the Association of Pedagogical Sororities. Later, the word "Educational" was changed to "Education". In 1947, AES dissolved, and its member organizations became associate members of the National Panhellenic Conference.
- Conference of Law Fraternities – organization of law fraternities that was established in 1923
- Council of Affiliated Panhellenics – organization of representatives of the National Panhellenic Congress, Professional Panhellenic Council, and the Association of Education Sororities
- Fraternity Advisors Association – co-founder of the Association of Fraternity/Sorority Advisors in 1976
- Interfraternity Research and Advisory Council – formed in 1946 from eight fraternity umbrella organizations at National Conference on College Fraternities and Societies</ref>
- Intermedical Fraternity Congress – organization of medical fraternities that was established in 1915
- National Association of Speech Arts Honor Fraternities
- National Osteopathic Interfraternity Council – association established in 1937 for osteopathic fraternities
- Professional Interfraternity Conference (PIC) – organized in 1928, this association of professional sororities merged to create the Professional Fraternity Association in 1978</ref>
- Professional Panhellenic Association (PPA) – organized in 1925, this association of professional sororities merged to create the Professional Fraternity Association in 1978</ref>

=== Social ===
- American Conference of Local Fraternities – organization for local American fraternities, established in 1923
- Grand Inter-Fraternity Council – organized in February 1909 for high school fraternities
- Fraternity Leadership Association (FLA) – organized in 2002 by two fraternities that withdrew their membership in NIC due to a disenchantment with the strategic direction of the organization. They were joined by four other fraternities, which kept dual membership in NIC. Eventually, it dissolved.
- Inter-Fraternity Congress of America
- Interfraternity Conference (IFC) – organized in 1910, this organization for collegiate fraternities changed its name to National Interfraternity Conference in 1931
- National Interfraternity Conference (NIC) – created in 1931 from the renaming of the Interfraternity Conference and changed its name to North American Interfraternity Conference in 1999 to reflect the organization's Canadian membership.</ref>
- National Junior College Panhellenic – organization of high school sororities

== See also ==
- College fraternities and sororities
- History of North American college fraternities and sororities
