= Fraternity Leadership Association =

American trade association for college fraternities

- FLA
- Founded: 2002; 24 years ago United States
- Type: Umbrella
- Affiliation: Independent
- Status: Defunct
- Emphasis: Collegiate fraternities
- Scope: National
- Chapters: 6 organizations (former)
- Headquarters: United States

The Fraternity Leadership Association (FLA) was an association of six fraternities that was created in 2002 as an alternative to the North American Interfraternity Conference.

== History ==
In 2002, core ideological differences caused disenchantment with the strategic direction assumed by North American Interfraternity Conference (NIC). Kappa Sigma, Phi Delta Theta and Phi Sigma Kappa did not agree with the goals and path taken by NIC during the previous six years. They believed that the conference placed too much emphasis on educational programming for individual undergraduates rather than focusing on the fraternity movement as a whole. Specifically, they noted that NIC was not addressing the issue of colleges closing their campus to new fraternities and increasing costs for insurance for fraternities. The three fraternities decided to leave NIC. Phi Delta Theta resigned from NIC on December 9, 2002.

The three fraternities decided to create a parallel national fraternity council that would better serve their needs. Delta Kappa Epsilon, Sigma Alpha Epsilon, Sigma Lambda Beta, and Sigma Pi voted to join such a council, although keeping dual membership in NIC. It was then that the Fraternity Leadership Association (FLA) was born. However, Phi Delta Theta, a founding member of the NIC, decided not to join FLA.

After several years, Phi Sigma Kappa decided to rejoin NIC. Thus, out of the six members in FLA, only Kappa Sigma remained without dual membership. Eventually, FLA dissolved. Kappa Sigma did not rejoin NIC.

== Members ==
- Delta Kappa Epsilon
- Kappa Sigma
- Phi Sigma Kappa
- Sigma Alpha Epsilon
- Sigma Lambda Beta
- Sigma Pi
