= Annals of Anatomy =

- Discipline: Anatomy
- Language: English
- Edited by: Friedrich Paulsen

Publication details
- Former name: Anatomischer Anzeiger
- History: 1886–present
- Publisher: Elsevier
- Frequency: Bimonthly
- Impact factor: 2.2 (2022)

Standard abbreviations
- ISO 4: Ann. Anat.

Indexing
- ISSN: 0940-9602
- OCLC no.: 58796533

Links
- Journal homepage; Online access

Annals of Anatomy is a peer-reviewed scientific journal covering the field of anatomy, published by Elsevier under its "Urban and Fischer" imprint. It was established in 1886 by Karl von Bardeleben and until 1991 was published under the title Anatomischer Anzeiger (ISSN 0003-2786) by Gustav Fischer Verlag.

According to the Journal Citation Reports, the journal has a 2022 impact factor of 2.2, ranking it 9th out of 20 journals in the category "Anatomy & Morphology".
