= Studentenverbindung =

German language student fraternities

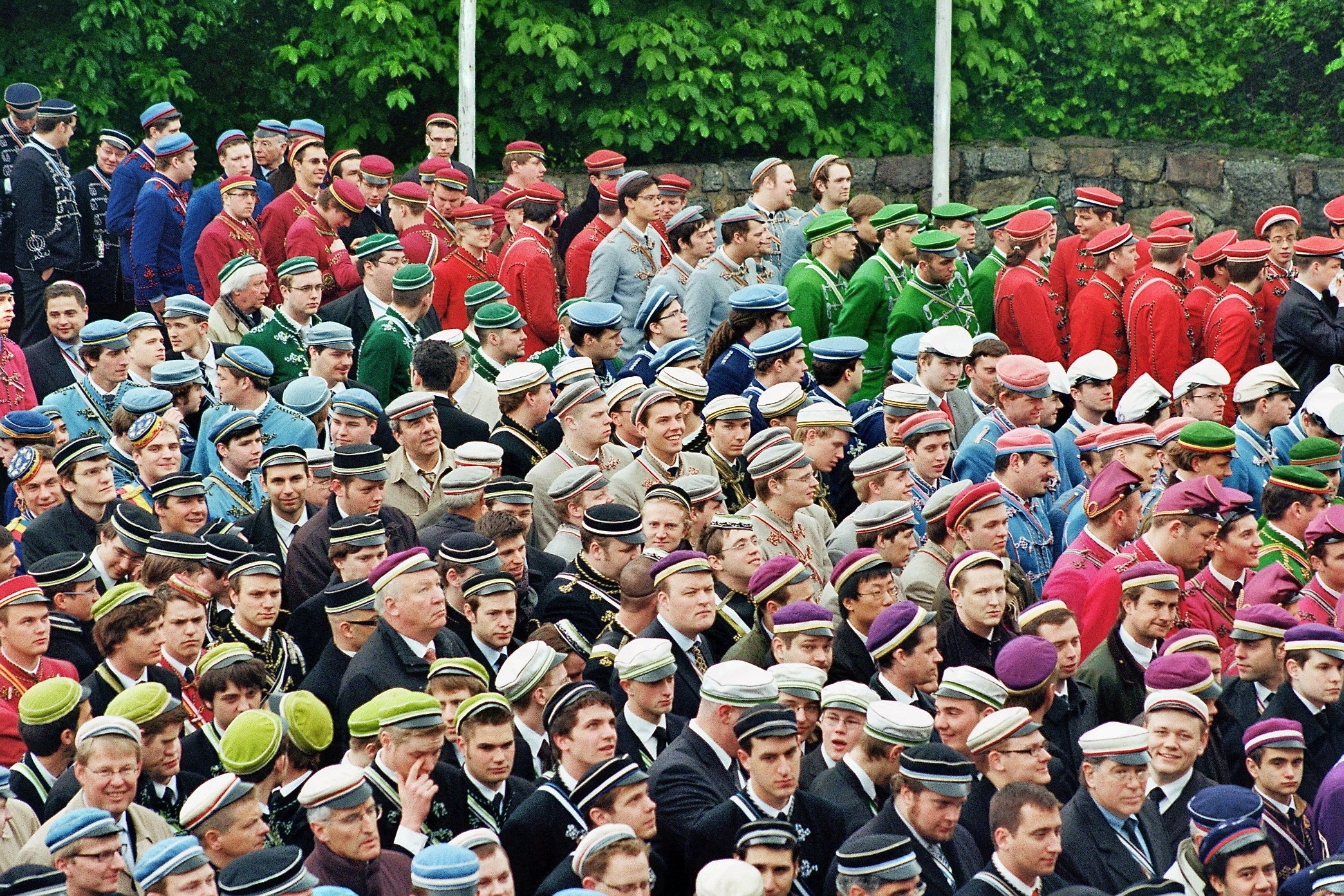
Meeting of a German student corps (2010)

Studentenverbindung (German: [ʃtuˈdɛntn̩.fɛʁˌbɪndʊŋ]) or studentische Korporation, often referred to as Verbindung, is the umbrella term for many different types of fraternity associations among students in German-speaking countries; these types include Corps, Burschenschaften, Landsmannschaften, Turnerschaften, and Catholic fraternities. Worldwide, there are more than 1,600 Studentenverbindungen, about a thousand of which are in Germany, with a total of more than 190,000 members. These fraternities are organized by umbrella groups. In these fraternities, students spend their university years in an organized community, whose members remain connected after graduation. A goal of this Lebensbund (lifelong bond) is to create contacts and friendships over many generations, as well as to facilitate networking. The Lebensbund is essential for the longevity of these networks.

Moreover, all student corporations share an important similarity—their autonomous and grassroots democratic Convent (from the Latin for 'assembly'). In addition to the Lebensbund and the Convent, every Studentenverbindung also has a so-called Comment (from the French for 'how'). The Comment is a body of rules organizing various aspects of fraternity life, such as the Couleur, Mensur (academic fencing), and general rules of conduct.

Fraternities of this type are present in multiple countries in Europe—Germany, Austria, Switzerland, Belgium, Hungary, Latvia, and Estonia—as well as (formerly) German or German-speaking areas and other smaller communities in Europe, and Chile. These groups originated in the 19th century, when Napoleon occupied the independent states of Germany. Fraternities were a way to express nationalism during an era of striving for national unity. During the era of the German Empire, fifty percent of all male students joined a fraternity. During the 1950s, this number had declined to thirty percent. Between one and two percent of current students in Germany are active members of a Studentenverbindung. These groups are all over Germany, but the largest number of them can be found in Munich with 60 fraternities in total. The decline in fraternal membership stems from a perception that these groups are anachronistic, even "stuffy", with right-wing views of masculinity. During the 21st century, several scandals have linked German fraternities to racism and sexism. Some fraternities require new members to pass a test on 19th- and 20th-century German history; German citizenship is another common requirement.

== Organization ==
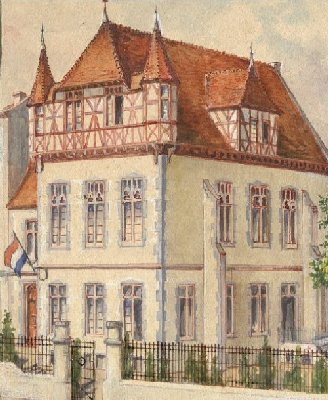
Corporation house of the Katholischer Studentenverein Arminia (Catholic Students Society Arminia) Bonn (1900–present)

Studentenverbindungen consist of two groups: active members who are students enrolled at a university, and the graduated Alte Herren (also spelled Altherren; lit. 'elderly gentlemen') or Philister (lit. 'Philistines')—each a fraternity's term for alumni. The graduated group also includes Hohe Damen (lit. 'high ladies'; a fraternity's term for alumnae). The graduated members were previously active in these corporations, and they later provide guidance and the necessary financial backing.

The active students are commonly divided into four groups. Three of these groups are as follows:

- The new, first-year Fuchs (lit. 'fox'; a fraternity's term for a pledge)
- The Bursche (lit. 'lad' or 'fellow'; a fraternity's term for a full member)
- Inactive full members (having had that status for a fixed time limit, usually three or four semesters)

These three groups form the fraternity's active core. A former category, the loosely associated Renonce, was removed at the beginning of the 20th century. This category is now synonymous with Fuchs in some fraternities.

The fourth group of active students, the Chargen (lit. 'offices'; a fraternity's term for officers), are full members elected by the former groups' democratic vote and entitled to decide on certain situations in everyday fraternity life. Common Chargierte (transl. office-holders; a fraternity's term for officers) are as follows:

- The Senior (signing his name with an x at the end, e.g., Mustermann Z! x)
- The Consenior(xx)
- The Drittchargierter, often also called Scriptor(xxx).

The Senior's task is mainly to represent the fraternity to the outside world and to lead the fraternity. The Consenior assists the Senior but mainly focuses on teaching fencing practice, organizing fraternity events, and maintaining constant contact with fellow female students. By contrast, the Drittchargierter is in charge of mail correspondence, finance, and diplomacy. Another function often referred to as a Chargierter (Charge) is the so-called Fuchsmajor (lit. 'fox major'; a fraternity's term for a pledge master). He is in charge of the pledges and teaches them the essentials of fraternity life, except for fencing. Officers in many fraternities are divided into high and low. In most types of student fraternity, pledges can also be officers (high or low, not Senior or pledge master, but possibly Consenior or Scriptor).

Studentenverbindungen, especially older ones, often own a large mansion, the Verbindungshaus, in which active members live. It usually consists of a dormitory and common rooms for festivities—most notably the Kneipe (pub) gathering—celebrations regularly involving student songs and other traditions.

One of many benefits of joining a fraternity in Germany is the low pricing of often high-quality rooms. Because Studentenverbindungen are much less prevalent in campus life in comparison to US fraternities, some Studentenverbindungen actively attempt to recruit new members through these low-priced rooms. After a certain period—the Fuchsenzeit (lit. 'foxes' time'; a fraternity's term for the pledge period)—these new members have the opportunity to learn the fraternity's traditions. After successful completion of all necessary tests and examinations, these pledges are usually accepted as full members.

After completing higher education and starting a career, the inactive full members are asked to resign from the fraternity's core membership and become alumni (Alte Herren or Philister). Those groups have less influence in active fraternity life and the core fraternity's democratic process, allowing younger generations to take their place. Major decisions, though, are still made by an annual Convent, where every member—student or not—has at least one vote; alumni usually have double votes and veto rights. Alumni may also handle the financial overview and supervise the Verbindungshaus.

Furthermore, all alumni are commonly asked to perform three duties: pay a certain annual sum to help support and sustain the fraternity, actively participate in democratic decisions concerning only alumni, and regularly attend the fraternity's festivities.

An important characteristic of this structure is as follows: the relationship between active members and alumni is usually so close that even young members are asked to address highly-decorated alumni using Du (the informal version of "you") or their first names. This practice commonly includes referring to one another as Verbindungsbruder (fraternity brother). As any Verbindung can sign treaties with another Verbindung, this practice may be extended to members of other fraternities. This relationship between old and young members allows young members to learn how to handle fraternity responsibilities.

== Mensur ==
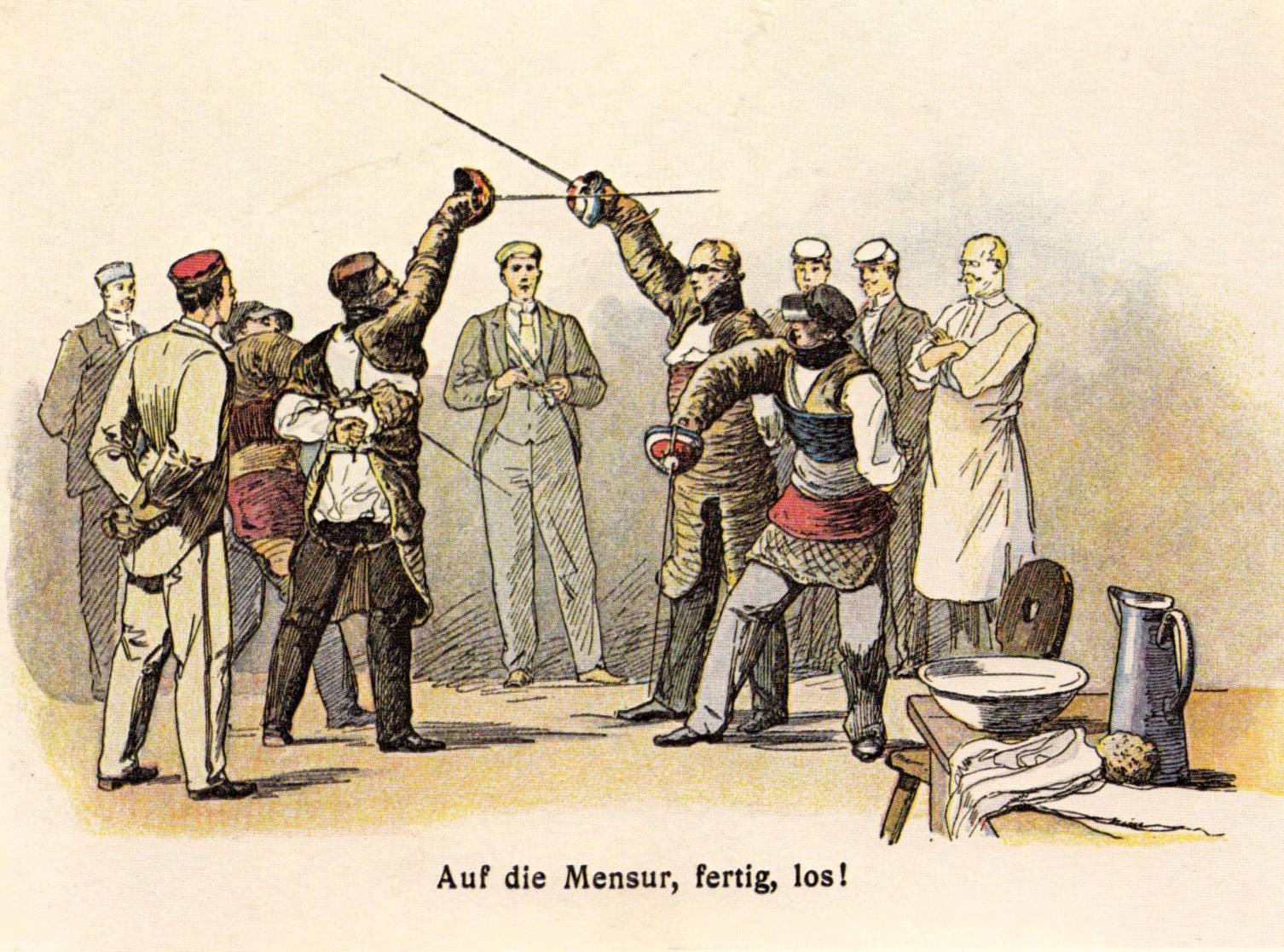
Ritual dueling in Würzburg around 1900

To lay people, the best-known tradition of Studentenverbindungen is the Mensur, a special form of strictly regulated, fixed-stance ritual fencing. The Mensur is practiced with sharp blades; although a member's eyes are protected, the tradition allows for cosmetic facial wounds, which often result in a scar called a Schmiss. Such a scar is regarded as a point of pride that demonstrates the member's "readiness to fight".

The object and purpose of the Corps was and still is solely the education of students to become a strong, free, and cosmopolitan personality who is not held back by religious, racist, national, scientific, or philosophical limitations of the mind. Three primary institutions within the fraternity aid with achieving this aim; including the Corpsconvent [regular council meetings of the Corps Brothers], the Kneipe [celebratory get-together of Corps Brothers with speeches, beer and songs], and today's Bestimmungsmensur [the event of academic fencing with sharp blades for the first or one of the first times], where the ones to fence are chosen based on placing two equal opponents in front of each other. [...] This experience, and the intertwined need to overcome one's fear, dedicated to the union of his Corps, and the connected strengthening of the sense of community aids the personal growth just as does taking a hit without losing one's stand and accepting the assessment of the Mensur by the own Corps Brothers.

— Hermann Rink

Fencing is not required by all fraternities. However, Mensur is the most central principle to some Verbindungen, especially of the Corps, Burschenschaften, and Landsmannschaften. Some other Verbindungen allow their members to fence voluntarily, but the majority do not include Mensur as part of their traditions. Christian fraternities generally do not practice Mensur, reflecting historical opposition within the Roman Catholic Church to dueling practices.

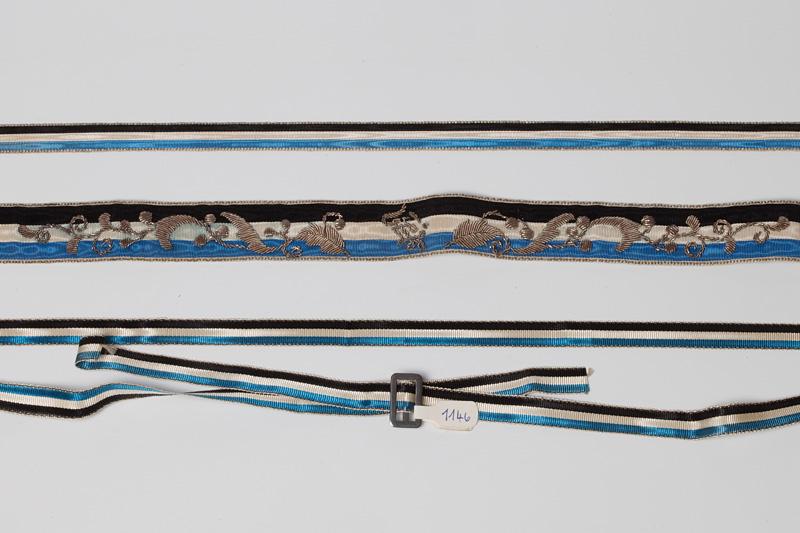
Couleur bands of the Zionist Verbindung Nehardea.

== Hallmarks and traditions ==
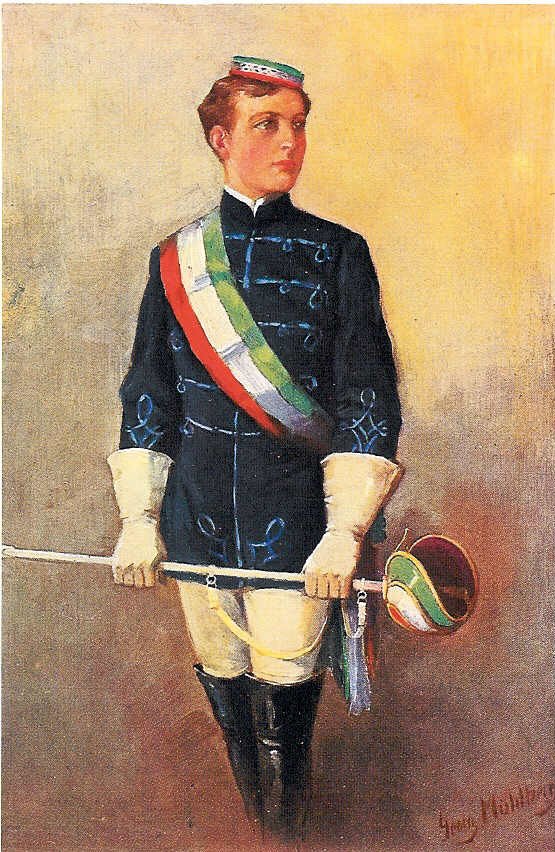
Officer in full uniform

=== Couleur ===
Visually, the most salient characteristic of many Studentenverbindungen is the so-called Couleur, which can consist of simply a small piece of ribbon worn over the belt, or elaborate uniforms with riding boots, sabers, and colorful cavalry jackets—depending on circumstances and traditions. Most often, a thin sash typically displaying three distinctive colors is worn in daily life; this sash is called a Band. Although such display was common in the past (during the Wilhelmine period), it has been less common at German universities since that time.

Farbentragend (color-wearing) Studentenverbindungen are those whose members wear a Band and headgear with their fraternity's colors. Many Burschenschaften wear the color combination black-red-gold as a historical symbol of German unity. These colors were first worn by the Urburschenschaft in 1815. There are also farbenführend (color-carrying or -bearing) Verbindungen; while their members do not wear sashes, their colors are often represented in uniforms and other Couleur, such as flags.

=== Zirkel ===
Another visual hallmark of Studentenverbindungen is the Zirkel, a monogram containing two elements: the fraternity's initials, as well as the letters v, c, and f representing the Latin words vivat, crescat, floreat (live, grow, flourish) or vivat circulus fratrum ('long live the circle of brothers'). The Zirkel is followed by an exclamation mark. On fraternity documents, members sign with a Zirkel after their signature. In contemporary society, Zirkel are often worn on the caps of new members.

Some sample Zirkel are as follows:

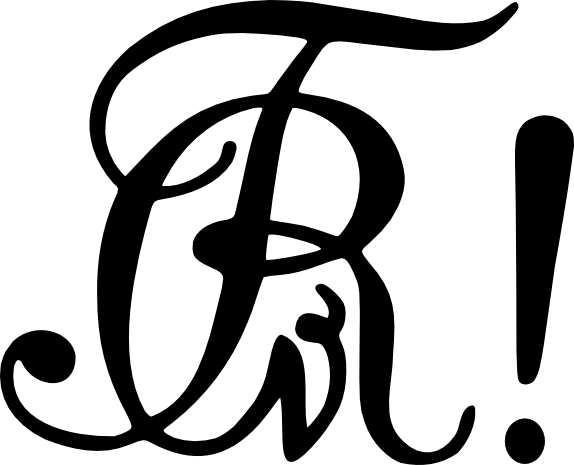
Corps Rhenania Heidelberg

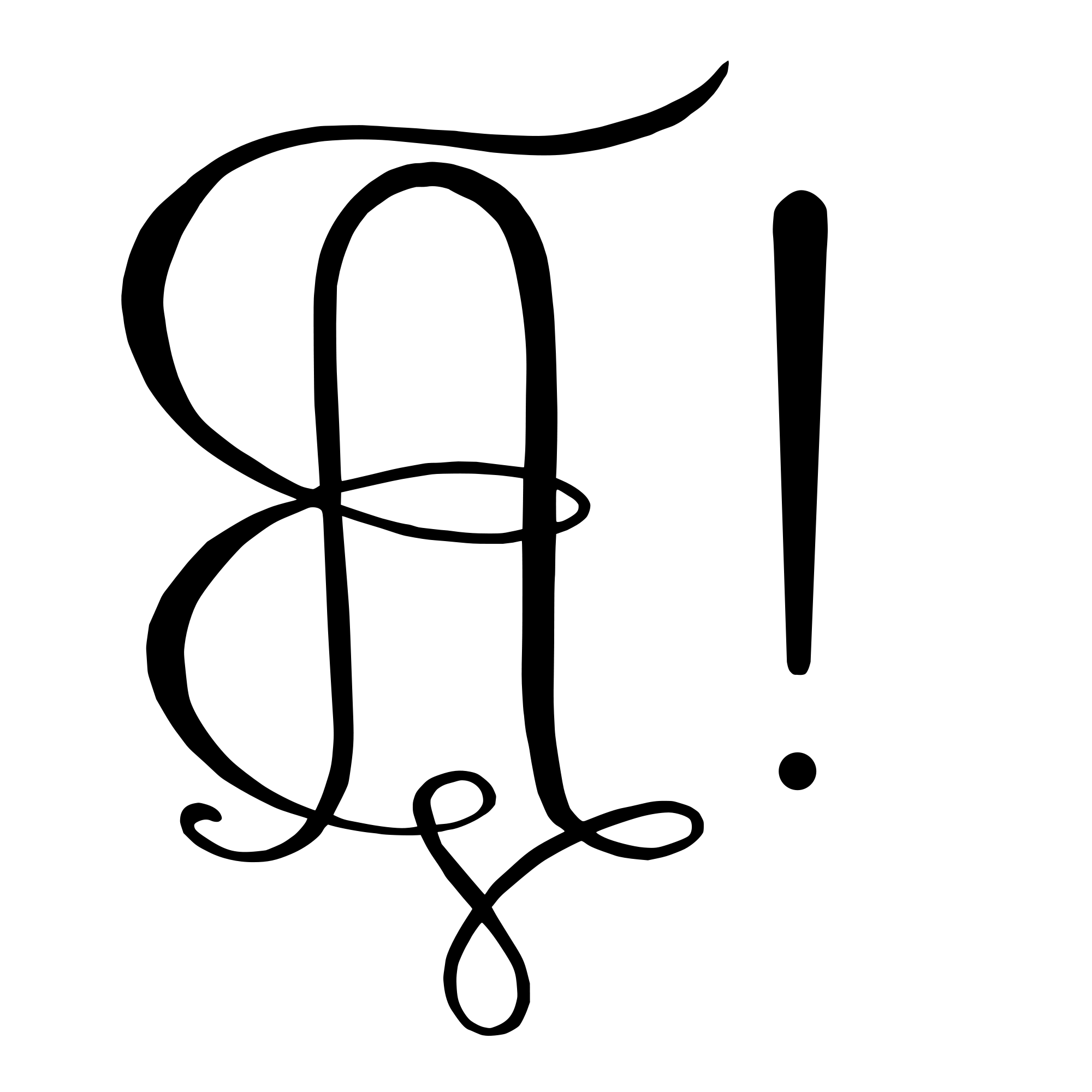
Burschenschaft Ascania Cologne

Chattia Aachen

Corps Hubertia Freiburg

K.D.St.V. Marchia (Breslau) Aachen

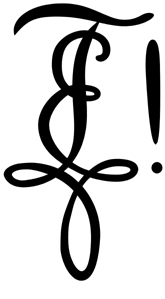
Burschenschaft Germania Braunschweig

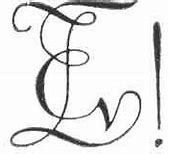
Landsmannschaft Zaringia Heidelberg

=== Coat of arms ===
Studentenverbindungen's coats of arms do not follow strict heraldic rules; these coats of arms were first used around 1800.

The escutcheon (heraldic shield) is often divided into four parts; a Burschenschaft's escutcheon is most often divided by a cross. These fields are filled with various nonheraldic symbols. Examples of these symbols are the fraternity's colors; the Zirkel; allusions to the fraternity's university or city, or other regional heraldic elements; and symbols for friendship and eternity, which derive from Freemasons and antiquity.

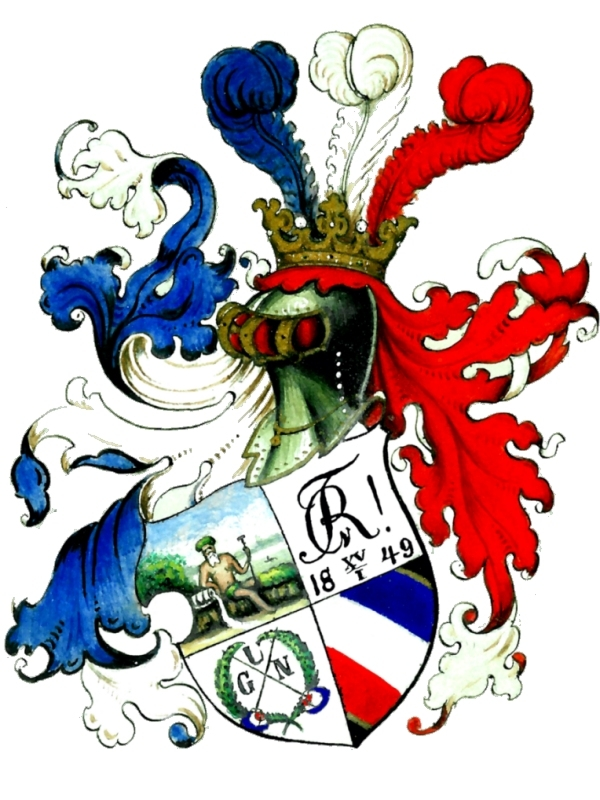
Corps Rhenania Heidelberg

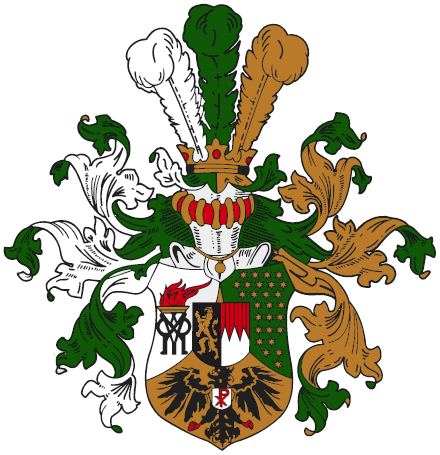
K.D.St.V. Rheno-Franconia München

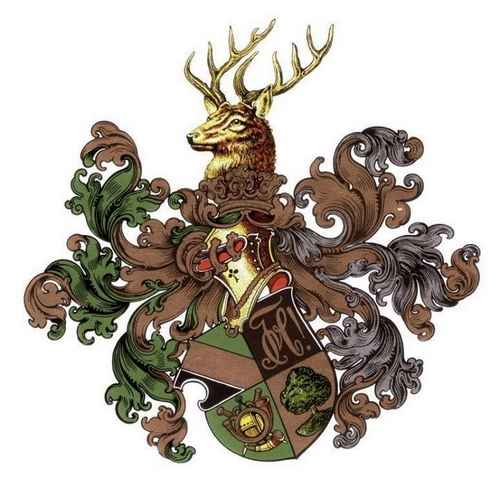
Corps Hubertia Freiburg

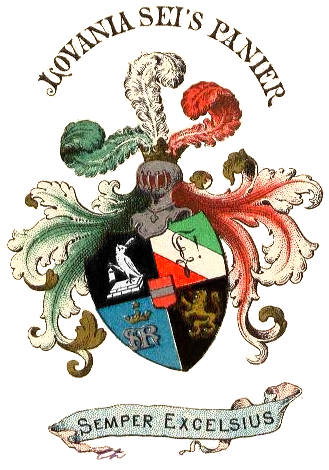
K.A.V. Lovania Leuven

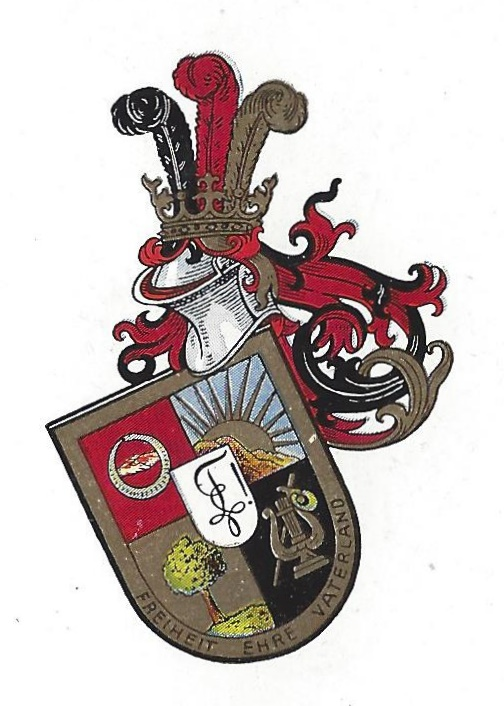
Alte Breslauer Burschenschaft der Raczeks

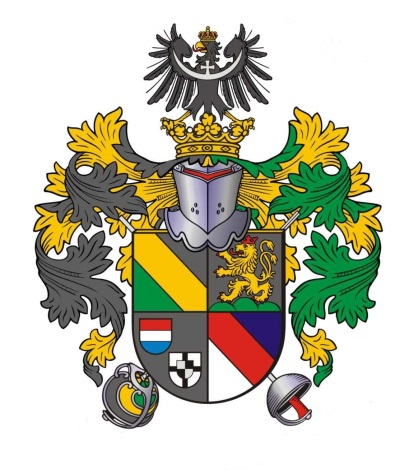
Landsmannschaft Zaringia Heidelberg

=== Kneipe ===
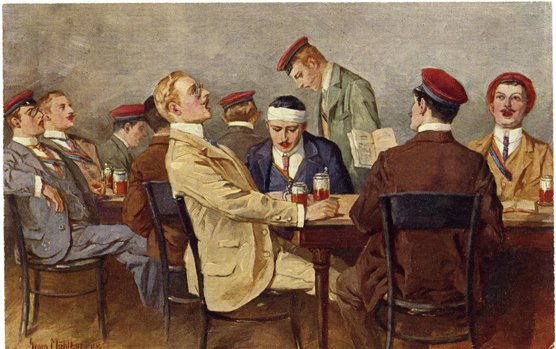
German students singing during a Kneipe (pub) gathering

More elaborate uniforms are usually worn at a Kneipe—or, more formally, a Commers—a kind of gathering still preserved only at Studentenverbindungen. Such events may occur regularly, but especially during holidays— for example, to celebrate Christmas; to commemorate a deceased Verbindung-brother (Trauerkneipe); or in remembrance of historic events or important dates in the fraternity's history, e.g., the founding day of the fraternity (Stiftungstagskneipe). During these gatherings, the members and guests present are presided over by the officers; the Senior conducts the gathering, executing certain rituals—from simply welcoming guests and holding speeches to performing the Landesvater ("father of the country") ceremony. In this ceremony, a saber pierces the Couleur-bearing headgear of participants in a complex ritual, which is accompanied by a ceremonial chant. While such rituals are only performed on the most solemn of occasions and thus rare, a Kneipe commonly involves the lighter side of life, such as unrestrained beer consumption and uninhibited singing of traditional student songs. Some of these songs can be considered bawdy by the standards of the time.

== History ==
=== Early history ===
When the first universities formed in Paris, Bologna, and Salerno around the 12th century, Europe was divided into a large number of small states; this arrangement was reflected in the composition of the student body. To ensure an equal influence on the university's decisions, the students and teachers began to form nationes (unions), with one nation for each native state of members. This tradition continued for centuries, and it still survives in Sweden and Finland.

When the first universities of the Holy Roman Empire were founded in Prague (1348), Vienna, and Heidelberg in the 14th century, they established a similar system, the Burse. (The term is derived from the Latin bursa meaning "coin purse"—from which the term Bursche stems—for the Burse's collective funds). Students were required to live in dorms according to their native states; students soon started using formal signs, often colorful clothing, to show membership in a Burse. This practice continues in the colored sashes worn by modern Studentenverbindungen. It remains unknown exactly when the first duels were fought, because students were permitted to carry épées or sabers for two purposes: to protect themselves and to deal with confrontations between rival groups (Raufduell).

In the 17th century, state sovereigns gained increasing control over their Burse; the first fraternities were formally formed, calling themselves Landsmannschaften. These fraternities assigned themselves Latin names according to their country of origin (e.g., Borussia for Prussia and Guestphalia for Westphalia); the fraternities also introduced pledge and full member as status designations. Lifelong membership, though, was unknown. During this period, the practice of regulated dueling was developed, accompanied by the idea of defending one's honor using a weapon, with a strict code to guide this confrontation. This potentially lethal tradition continued in Germany until 1933, being so strict at some points, for example, that a Prussian officer could be expelled if he was unwilling to demand or give satisfaction.

As the Landsmannschaften faded during the early 1700s, secret organizations known as Studentenorden (student orders) took their place; these student orders introduced elaborate rituals, formal oaths of membership, a strict constitution to regulate internal behavior, and cryptic symbols to identify members. All of these traditions are still known and actively practiced in contemporary fraternities. However, the Studentenorden were heavily monitored by the then-absolutist government, because many of their traditions were derived from Freemason or Illuminati lodges; the Studentenorden were subsequently banned in 1793.

=== Early 19th century ===
As the Studentenorden were dissolved and their former members sought the possibility of continuing their traditions, these organizations began rebuilding a similar form of community under the then-common and innocuous French word Corps. Symbols, oaths, regulations, and rituals were continued from the Studentenorden tradition (although secrecy was omitted for longevity's sake); the Latin names, status designations, and affiliation with a country of origin were copied from the now-extinct Landsmannschaften.

A novel characteristic of the Corps was the heavy influence of German idealism, particularly as reflected in the works of Kant and Fichte. This idealism resulted in a strong focus on developing young members to be strong, upright, and honorable—for the nation's "best and brightest" to spread these ideas throughout society. Political activities—especially geopolitical activities of Corps as a whole— were actively discouraged, because social commitment was seen as more promising and less controversial. Another characteristic was the unification of all of a city's—and ultimately all of Germany's—Corps under an umbrella organization, as well as voting on common rules and principles for each Corps to abide by. As a result, the Kösener Senioren-Convents-Verband (KSCV) organization was created in 1848. The oldest existing Studentenverbindung, Corps Guestphalia Halle (established in 1789), was a founding member.

=== Burschenschaft and rebellion against aristocracy ===
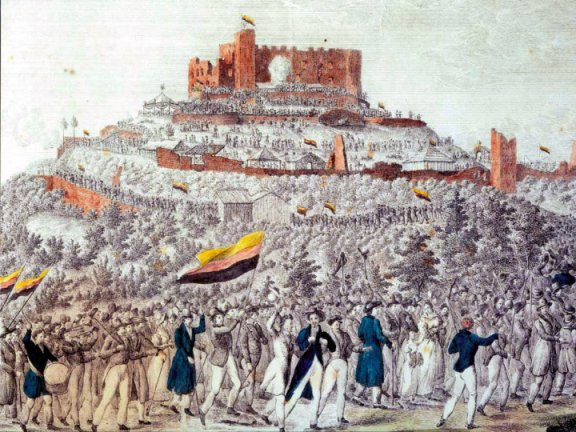
Procession to Hambach Castle during the Hambach Festival (1832)

The Corps soon found themselves confronted by the Burschenschaft, which was founded in 1815. Sparked by nationalist sentiment after the Napoleonic Wars, members of the Burschenschaft perceived the traditional forms of fraternities—which were still heavily affiliated with their states of origin—to be reactionary and elitist. Therefore, they organized themselves into what was envisioned as a single fraternity spanning all states with the German language, allowing students to coordinate a nationalist revolution (i.e., a revolution to unify Germany and to abolish all princedoms). From the beginning, the Burschenschaft was a dedicated political organization, unlike the Corps.

This early attempt failed in 1819, when the Burschenschaft was fragmented, but the sentiment persisted. On this occasion, the modern German colors are mentioned for the first time in popular culture—in the seventh verse of August Daniel von Binzer's song "Wir hatten gebauet ein stattliches Haus", which mentions the colors of the Burschenschaft:

Das Band ist zerschnitten,
war schwarz, rot und gold,
und Gott hat es gelitten,
wer weiß was er gewollt!

The ribbon is cut,
t'was black, red, and gold,
and God suffer'd it,
who knows what his intent!

(German original, with English translation)

=== Carlsbad Decrees ===
In the same year, because of general antisemitism prevalent in all social classes, massive antisemitic protests—fueled mainly by students, craftsmen, and traders (see Hep-Hep riots)—swept the German-speaking states, injuring and killing many people. As a result of the ensuing Carlsbad Decrees, any self-regulating student body was forcibly dissolved; punishments were instituted; and government authority was significantly increased.

These decrees resulted in secret gatherings and small revolutionary acts, many of which are seen as the foundation of the modern German nation. One example was the Hambach festival in 1832, where the German colors were displayed on a flag for the first time. Another example was the failed Frankfurter Wachensturm revolution in 1833, which attempted to take the treasury of the large city of Frankfurt to fund a revolution.

=== Revolution of 1848 and subsequent diversification ===
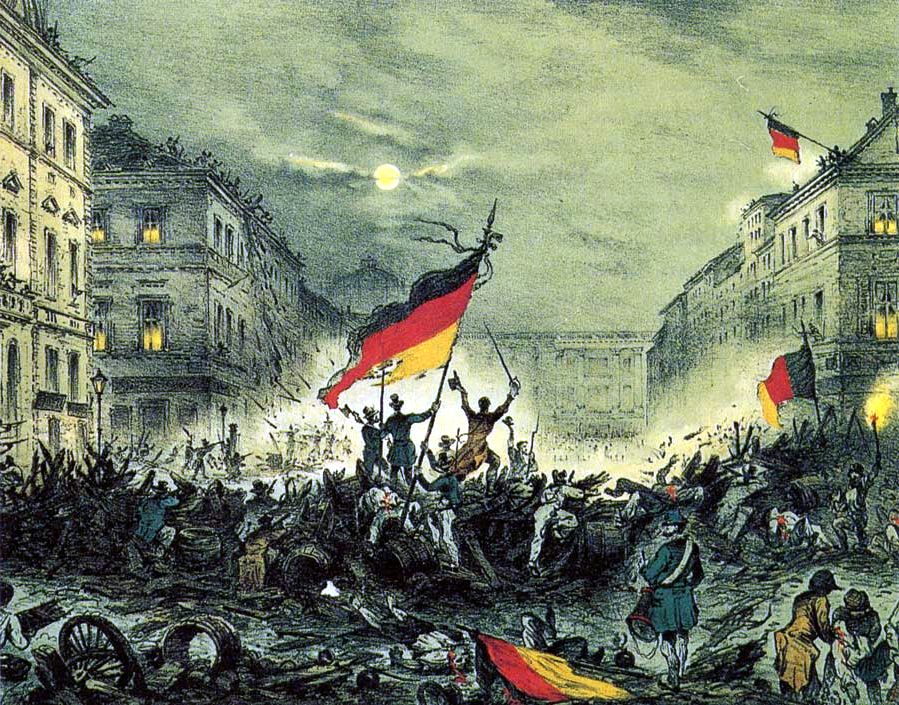
Cheering revolutionaries in Berlin (1848)

Members of a German-speaking student corps with Mensur swords (Schläger), Czernowitz (Bukovina), c. 1890.

Tensions started to build around this time, with short-lived, illegal fraternities forming, being dissolved, and reforming at all universities; this process peaked in the German revolution of 1848, in which many members of Studentenverbindungen participated. Although the unification of Germany failed violently, the Studentenverbindungen liberated themselves. Many of the members of the first Frankfurt parliament were Corps students or Burschenschaft members.

As a result, the general concept of Studentenverbindungen flourished; soon, the Studentenverbindungen were no longer viewed as clubs of young rowdies and revolutionaries, but as a valuable training ground for the future. This allowed alumni to identify with active members of their fraternities, and the idea of a lifelong commitment arose (Lebensbundprinzip). Soon, the first Stiftungsfeste—annual festivities in celebration of a fraternity's founding—were held, further solidifying the reputation of the fraternities. As increased liberty permitted, a more regulated form of duel was conceived: the modern Mensur, which strove to reduce lethality rates while still allowing fencing. The former objective was greatly impaired by potential treatments, however, with infected wounds posing a substantial risk.

During this time, the first Christian fraternities were established by religious students. Although some of these students still took up weapons, many refused to do so on ethical and religious grounds. These fraternities often carried generic names, unifying themselves under an umbrella organization such as the oecumenical Wingolf. (Wingolf Bonn was the first in 1841.)

When the Catholic religion began to be repressed during the political conflict known as the Kulturkampf, many fraternities of Catholic belief were formed in response. The first organization of definitely Catholic origin was the Schweizerische Studentenverein ("Swiss students' union") in 1841. These Catholic fraternities viewed themselves as an important network to counteract the Kulturkampf.

In 1848, a Germany-wide association of Corps—the Kösener Senioren-Convents-Verband (KSCV) (roughly "the Kösen association of committees of the first men in charge")—was founded in Bad Kösen. This association consisted solely of old Corps at traditional liberal arts colleges, and it excluded those at technical colleges. In response, the Weinheimer Senioren-Convent (WSC) was established, which unified the old Corps at technical colleges. Today, the two umbrella organizations are tightly linked by a cooperation treaty known as Die Corps ("the Corps").

The fraternities soon diversified, and formerly informal clubs were reorganized; these included sports clubs influenced by the political ideas of Turnvater Jahn (Turnerschaften), academic choirs (Sängerschaften), and groups influenced by the progressive movement (Landsmannschaften, named after the 17th-century organizations). Each fraternity had its namesake as its central principle and idea of character building. Landsmannschaft Sorabia-Westfalen Münster is the oldest Studentenverbindung with a modern constitution. This fraternity was founded in 1716 in the City of Leipzig.

A notable exception to these self-oriented principles is the Verband der Vereine Deutscher Studenten (VVDSt) ("union of associations of German students"), which had a strict antisemitic policy and was formed in 1881 as a decidedly political group. In reaction, the first Jewish fraternities were established in the 1880s, lasting until the Nazi regime. Theodor Herzl, the founder of zionism and a former Burschenschaft student, was soon made an honorary member of many of these fraternities. Moreover, Jewish fraternities were heavily focused on liberating themselves through duels and Mensur.

Finally, around the turn of the century, women were admitted to visit universities, unifying to sororities in 1899. The first such organization was the Club der Namenlosen ("club of the nameless"), which was soon renamed to Verein Studierender Frauen Deutschlands Hilaritas ("association of female students of Germany Hilaritas").

This diversification progressed so far that the previously despised student culture heavily influenced society, especially language. During the Wilhelminian Era (1888–1918), this diversification peaked—the largest share of the academic community (either active or alumni) belonged to one or more of the over 1300 fraternities; non-members even cut themselves with razors to simulate the appearance of characteristic fencing wounds. Otto von Bismarck and Kaiser Wilhelm II are the best-known Corps students and German fraternity students.

=== World War I, Weimar Republic, and Nazi rule ===
This fraternity period lasted until World War I, which called upon all students to serve their country. Wartime fatalities substantially reduced the number of fraternity members and students overall. Three factors—the violence the students had experienced at war, the uncertainty of the Weimar Republic period, and the deeply felt humiliation from the harsh conditions of the Treaty of Versailles—caused many fraternity members to enlist in the newly founded Freikorps, paramilitary organizations thought to protect democracy. As open battles between Freikorps members and communist activists began, many people quickly radicalized throughout society; this resulted in formerly non-political fraternities developing an extreme nationalist, anticommunist, and antisemitic perspective. As this extremism was fertile ground for the newly founded Nazi Party, many fraternities soon committed themselves to its principles, with some—such as the Burschenschaft—expelling Jews as early as 1920.

When the Nazi Party seized power in 1933, many people rejoiced, although it was soon clear that Studentenverbindungen would not be allowed to persist. There were several exceptions, though, most notably the Corps Saxo-Borussia. Its members loudly discussed on different occasions whether "the Führer were to eat his asparagus with his knife, his fork, or his paws", concluding that he had "so large a gab, he would be able to eat it crosswise".

This led to all Studentenverbindungen being classified as "reactionary"; most of them either dissolved themselves or were forcibly closed between 1934 and 1938. The former members were then reorganized in Kameradschaften ("comradeships") and forced to relinquish their principles of democratic voting, lifelong cooperation, honor, and tradition. In secrecy, though, many of these former customs were still practiced—although with the outbreak of World War II, few members remained to do so during the war.

=== After World War II ===
After World War II, the surviving former fraternity members soon tried to reorganize themselves, often fusing two or more Verbindungen to allow for greater impact; an example is Guestphalia Bonn (in West Germany) and Guestphalia Greifswald (in East Germany). Although this process was initially made illegal by occupation forces and universities, fraternities slowly regained a foothold in society (see Corps Suevia). Particular influences on this renewal included several court rulings:

- A decision that the Mensur does not violate the moral code (in 1951)
- A decision that the public display of fraternity colors cannot be punished by expulsion from a university (in 1958, so-called "Freiburg color dispute")
- The forced acceptance of the last fencing fraternity in Berlin (in 1968)
- The formal obligation for head of state Theodor Heuss to abolish duels for honor

One side effect of the fraternities' historical situation is as follows: because of their persistent struggle to regain acceptance through legal action and the sheer will to survive, post-war fraternities in Germany—unlike their pre-war counterparts—received no university funding, but also became entirely independent of university regulation or oversight.

While this independence allowed for progress—which was achieved during the 1950s and early 1960s—the Verbindungen received another blow in 1968, with the general socialist sentiment amongst the student movement and its desire to abolish anything considered reactionary. Many prejudices expressed around that time still form the base of the public's limited knowledge about Verbindungen, resulting in a slow and steady decline in membership later. Significant improvement was brought about only by the recent Bologna process, which deprived students of long-familiar means of studying, thus increasing the demand for assistance from experienced alumni. In 2013, fewer than one percent of German university students were active members of a Studentenverbindung.

The most prosperous Studentenverbindungen can still be found in cities and towns with traditional liberal arts colleges and universities—such as Göttingen, Bonn, and Heidelberg in Germany—with Munich being an exception. Traditional structures have mostly been preserved, with rituals, codes of honor, symbols, and principles still intact. Most Studentenverbindungen are still restricted to a single gender, with the male varieties actively practicing the Mensur. However, many Studentenverbindungen have formally repented for their supposed mistakes; memorials of unjustly excluded Jews, for example, are often seen in a Verbindungshaus.

== Controversy ==
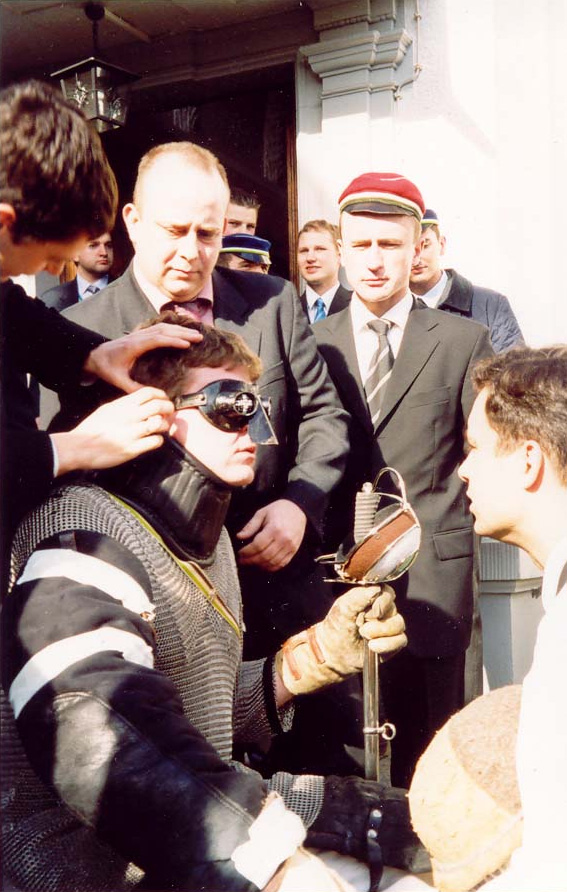
Modern preparations for a Mensur (academic fencing)

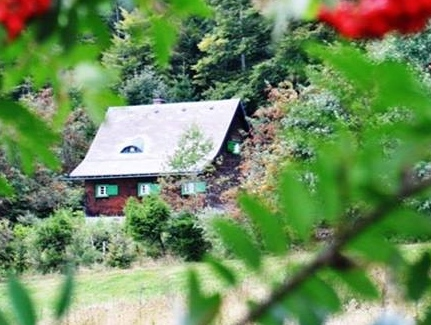
Some fraternities maintain a lodge in addition to their main Verbindungshaus. This example, belonging to the Corps Hubertia Freiburg, is in the heights of the Black Forest.

Many criticisms of fraternities are typically discussed unproductively. The most common of these include accusations of nationalism, racism, sexism, homophobia, and elitism.

- Nationalism: Based on the historical background of many Verbindungen—especially Burschenschaften, having either a strong link to a former principality or having displayed strong nationalism before principalities were abolished—the accusation of nationalism is most frequent, which damages the reputations of other Verbindungen.
- Racism: Given the long history of racial supremacy and antisemitism in German-speaking countries, today's Verbindungen are often deemed prone to structural racism. Nevertheless, supporters often argue that the evidence is largely anecdotal. The Burschenschaft's criterion of admitting only men "of German culture" often receives criticism as well. However, the majority of Verbindungen, especially Corps, define themselves as generally tolerant, regardless of race, ethnicity, or national origin.
- Sexism: As the majority of Studentenverbindungen are men-only, left-wing student organizations often raise allegations of sexism. These allegations are often combined with accusations of elitism, because Studentenverbindungen restrict women's access to the lucrative career networks available to men. There are many women-only Verbindungen, with a history back to 1898, while the oldest active Verbindung was founded in 1976.
- Elitism: Alumni are said to take care of students' careers—helping students in their fields of study and other areas of life, up to and including arranging good jobs and opportunities after graduation. This networking is seen as problematic by other students and most students' unions. Today's fraternities dismiss this criticism as a stereotype from the Wilhelminian Era, when fraternities were more common, and a career was nearly impossible without fraternal assistance.

Aside from debates, these accusations have led to numerous acts of politically motivated violence. There were more than 100 cases in 2010 alone, ranging from simple vandalism—such as destroying windows and spraying graffiti—through aggravated assault, to arson endangering fraternity members.

== Common types ==
Despite a wide variety of Studentenverbindungen, certain kinds are more common than others:

Common types of Studentenverbindungen
Type	Characteristics	Umbrella organization(s)	Number of fraternities	References
Catholic Studentenverbindungen (wearing Couleur)	WC, NF	Cartellverband der katholischen deutschen Studentenverbindungen, Ring Katholischer Deutscher Burschenschaften, Cartellverband der Katholischen Österreichischen Studentenverbindungen, Technischer Cartell-Verband, Schweizerischer Studentenverein, Akademischer Bund Katholisch-Österreichischer Landsmannschaften, Mittelschüler-Kartell-Verband der katholischen farbentragenden Studentenkorporationen Österreichs	436	
Corps	WC, PF	Kösener Senioren-Convents-Verband, Weinheimer Senioren-Convent	162	
Burschenschaft	WC, PF/FO	Deutsche Burschenschaft, Verband der Akademischen Burschenschaften in Österreich, Conservativer Delegierten Convent der fachstudentischen Burschenschaften in Österreich, Neue Deutsche Burschenschaft	158	
Catholic Studentenverbindungen (not wearing Couleur)	NC, NF	Kartellverband katholischer deutscher Studentenvereine, Verband der Wissenschaftlichen Katholischen Studentenvereine Unitas, Kartellverband katholischer nichtfarbentragender akademischer Vereinigungen Österreichs	126	
Landsmannschaft	WC, PF	Coburger Convent der akademischen Landsmannschaften und Turnerschaften, Österreichischer Landsmannschafter- und Turnerschafter Convent	84	
Female Studentenverbindungen (Damenverbindung)	WC/NC, NF	Vereinigung christlicher Studentinnenverbindungen Österreichs, Verband farbentragender Mädchen, partially organized in Sondershäuser Verband, Schwarzburgbund and Unitasverband	~ 70	
Other Christian Studentenverbindungen	mostly WC, NF	Schwarzburgbund, Wingolf, Wartburg-Kartell Evangelischer Akademischer Verbindungen, Akademischer Bund Österreichischer Katholischer Landsmannschaften	61	
Academic gymnastic clubs	NC, NF	Akademischer Turnbund, ATBÖ	41	
Verein Deutscher Studenten	NC, NF	VVDSt—KV	40	
Turnerschaft	WC, PF/FO	Coburger Convent and Marburger Konvent	34	
Sängerschaft	WC, FO	Deutsche Sängerschaft (DS), Weimarer Interessengemeinschaft (WIG) (Note: Since the 1990s, the Austrian Sängerschaften are no longer in the DS. Traditional Austrian Sängerschaften from Prague, Brünn, etc., are also part of the WIG. This has occurred because the DS no longer lives the ideas of the 19th century, and it defines Germany as the Bundesrepublik Deutschland, rather than as the German idea of an old traditional culture.)	20 (WIG 7—Karlsruhe, München, Innsbruck, Salzburg, Graz, Linz, Wien)	
Hunting Verbindungen	WC, PF/FO	Wernigeroder Jagdkorporationen Senioren-Convent and Kongreß Akademischer Jagdcorporationen	17	

Abbreviations:

- WC: wearing Couleur
- NC: not wearing Couleur in hat or ribbon
- PF: practicing academic fencing
- FO: academic fencing optional
- NF: not practicing academic fencing

Uncommon but influential Studentenverbindungen are the academical-technical engineering clubs ("Akademischer Verein") of the Hütte and the Miltenberg-Wernigeroder Ring; the "Hütte" is the publisher of one of the major engineering compendia in Germany.

== See also ==
- Bund Chilenischer Burschenschaften
- Cartellverband
- Coburger Convent
- Kartellverband
- Kösener Senioren-Convents-Verband
- Schweizerischer Studentenverein
- Studentenvereniging
- Weinheimer Senioren-Convent
- Wingolf
