= Karl von Bardeleben =

German anatomist

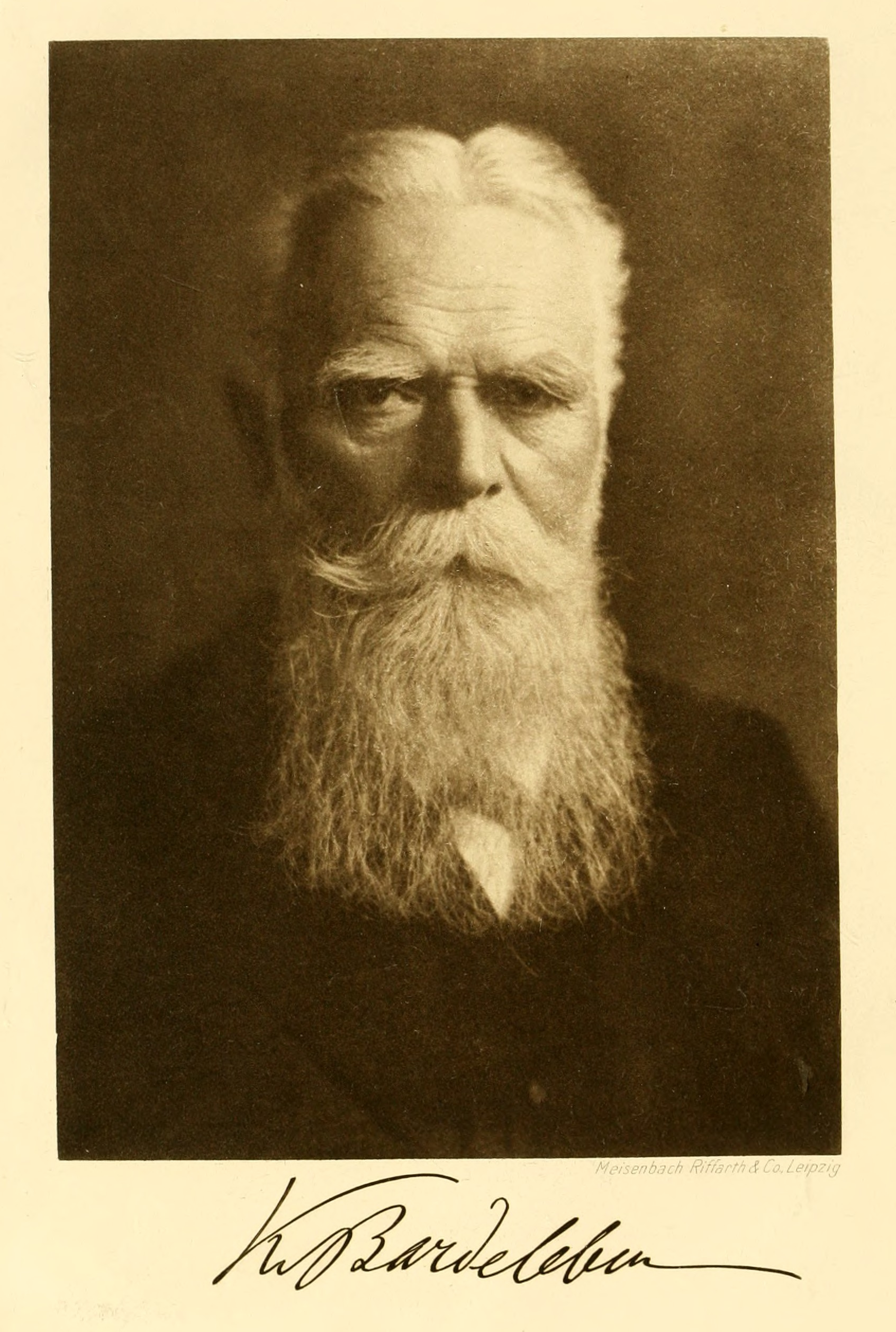
Karl von Bardeleben (1849-1919)

Karl von Bardeleben (7 March 1849 – 19 December 1919) was a German anatomist born in Giessen. He was the son of surgeon Heinrich Adolf von Bardeleben (1819–1895).

He received his education at the Universities of Greifswald, Heidelberg, Berlin and Leipzig. In 1874 he became a Privatdozent at the University of Jena, where he later served as an associate professor (from 1878) and full professor (from 1898). Bardeleben specialized in the fields of topographic and comparative anatomy.

In 1886 Bardeleben was founder of the Anatomischer Anzeiger (Annals of Anatomy), a journal that is considered to be one of the better publications on anatomical morphology. The journal contains many original treatises on topographic and clinical anatomy, embryology, cell and tissue research, as well as microscopic and "submicroscopic" biology.

In 1892 he published the collected anatomical writings of Johann Wolfgang von Goethe, titled "Goethe als Anatom". Other significant writings by Bardeleben are:

- Atlas der topographischen Anatomie des Menschen: für Studierende und Ärzte (Atlas of applied (topographical) human anatomy for students and practitioners); with Heinrich Haeckel, in collaboration with Fritz Frohse (1871–1916) and Theodor Ziehen (1862–1950).
- Anleitung zum Praeparieren auf dem Sociersaale (1884).
- Die Anatomie des Menschen (1913). Digital edition by the University and State Library Düsseldorf
