= Landsmannschaft (Studentenverbindung) =

German fraternity

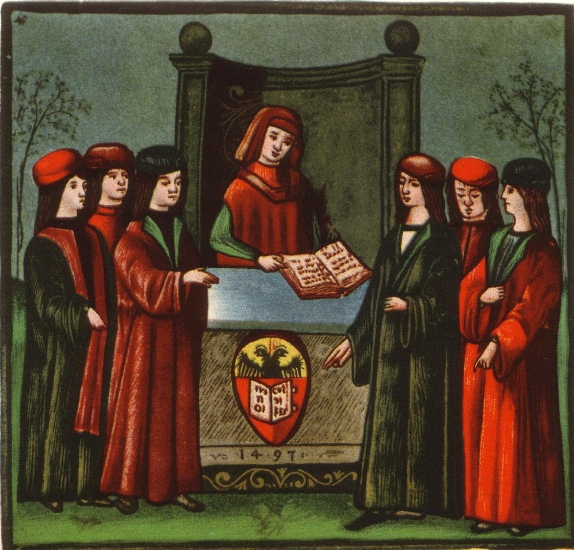
Bologna, 15th century: Admission of a student in "Germanic Nation"

A Landsmannschaft (German: [ˈlantsmanʃaft]; Latin natio, plural nationes) is a German fraternity of several fraternity forms called Studentenverbindung.

The older forms of Landsmannschaften were part of corporations and are closely aligned with the beginnings of universities in medieval times of the 12th and 13th centuries.

The newer forms of Landsmannschaften are a kind of reform corps and most Landsmannschaften are members of the Coburger Convent.

This is also the term for a Jewish burial society: landsmanshaft

== History ==
In order to understand the history of German fraternities, it needs to be known that the first universities in Europe were established in the 12th and 13th century in Paris (France), Bologna and Padua (Italy), and later also in Oxford and Cambridge (England). Students joined groups in regards to region in order to have protection as well as support in being heard in their interests. The two early forms were called nations (Nationes) or colleges (Collegien) and organized not only the work but also social life and had major influence in universities as they elected the head of a university (magister) in some areas.

Landsmannschaften formerly had the character of guilds. They were loosely organized bodies of students from the same region or nation naturally enough drawn together by their longings for companionship. A good example is the Mosellanerlandsmannschaft of the University of Jena. It contained members from the Rhineland, Palatinate, Swabia, and Alsace. The purposes of the organizations in general were:

1. to encourage friendship;
2. to compel the adjustment of difficulties arising among members;
3. to protect a "brother member" against slander or other attack from outsiders;
4. to share in social enjoyments;
5. to perform friendly services for one another;
6. to yield to the will of the majority;
7. to obey the president as long as he directs for the best interests of the organization.

By 1786, this code had grown to 86 paragraphs.

== Notable members ==
- Karl von Bardeleben
- Johann Becker (politician)
- Heinrich Biltz
- Peter Harry Carstensen
- Johannes Conrad
- Christian August Crusius
- Thomas Dehler
- Wilhelm Dörpfeld
- Rolf Emmrich
- Paul Flechsig
- Levin Goldschmidt
- Ernst Haeckel
- Otto Hahn
- Herbert Haupt
- Oscar Hertwig
- Gottlob Honold
- Theodor Koch-Grunberg
- Friedrich August Körnicke
- Georg Kükenthal
- Hermann Löns
- Karl Marx
- Franz Melde
- Ernst von Mohl
- Gottfried Münzenberg
- Günther Oettinger
- Hermann Oncken
- Josef Priller
- Johannes Rehmke
- Walter Reppe
- Heinrich Sahm
- Ferdinand Sauerbruch
- Clemens Schmalstich
- Ferdinand Schneider
- Joseph Schröter
- Ludwig Schwamb
- Ernst Siehr
- Wilhelm Sievers
- Hans-Heinrich Sievert
- Wilhelm Solf
- Heinrich Spoerl
- Johannes Steinhoff
- Theodor Thierfelder
- Wilhelm Trübner
- Rainer Wieland
- Alexander von Zagareli

== See also ==
- Nations in Finnish universities
- Nations in Swedish universities
- Studentenvereniging
- Sudetendeutsche Landsmannschaft
