= Turnerschaft =

German student sports organizations

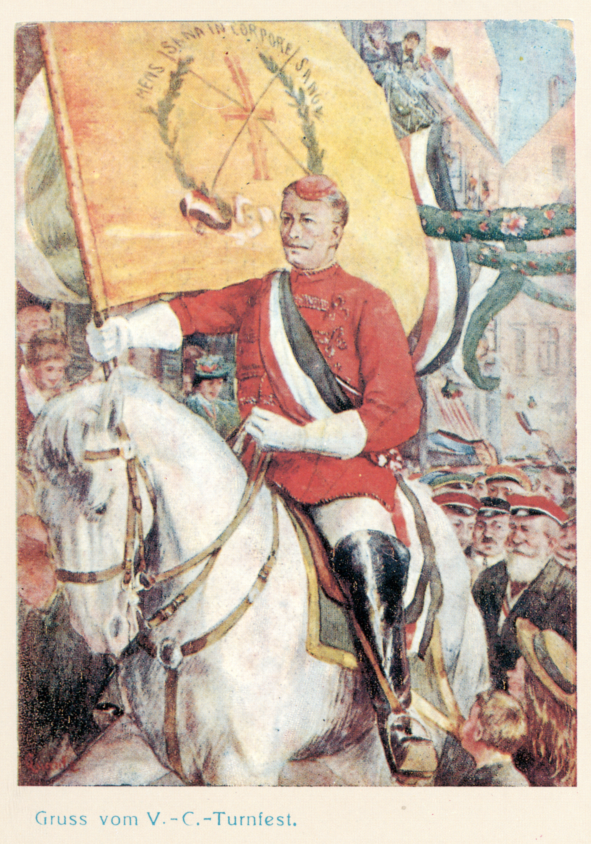
Turnerschafter

A Turnerschaft is a kind of Studentenverbindung, a German student corporation, similar to fraternities in the US and Canada. The Turnerschaften are a sports corps, and students practice the Mensur (academic fencing).

Most Turnerschaften are members of either the Coburger Convent or the Marburger Convent.

== Notable Turnerschaft members ==
- Christoph Ahlhaus
- Karl Andree
- Heinrich Biltz
- Adolf Butenandt
- Otto Dempwolff
- Max Eckert-Greifendorff
- Franz Etzel
- Carl Friedrich Goerdeler
- Hugo Junkers
- Friedrich August Kekulé von Stradonitz
- Eckart von Klaeden
- Hermann Löns
- Gottfried Münzenberg
- Ferdinand Sauerbruch
