= Ferdinand Schneider =

German chemist (1911–1984)

Ferdinand Gottlob Schneider
- Born: June 18, 1911; Backnang, Kingdom of Württemberg, German Empire
- Died: May 11, 1984 (aged 72); Pura, Switzerland
- Education: University of Tübingen; University of Freiburg; Ludwig-Maximilians-Universität München (Ph.D., 1934)
- Known for: Sugar technology
- Scientific career
- Fields: Chemistry; Sugar technology
- Workplaces: Dresden University of Technology; Technical University of Danzig; Braunschweig University of Technology

Ferdinand Gottlob Schneider (18 June 1911 – 11 May 1984) was a German chemist.

Schneider was born in Backnang in the Kingdom of Württemberg. He studied at the University of Tübingen, the University of Freiburg, and the Ludwig-Maximilians-Universität München (Ph.D. 1934) and subsequently held the positions of privat-docent at the Dresden University of Technology (1941), Technical University of Danzig and professor at the Braunschweig University of Technology (1949–1970). Schneider is the author of the German edition of Sugar Technology and hundreds of sugar-related articles. Professor Schneider was director of Agricultoral Technology and the Sugar Industry in Braunschweig. He taught sugar technology for many years in Germany. During his career, he trained many men and women from around the world who have PhD in sugar technology.

In 1929, he joined the fraternity Landsmannschaft Schottland. In 1984 Schneider died in Pura, Switzerland.
