= Academic fencing =

Sword fight between two male members of different fraternities with sharp weapons

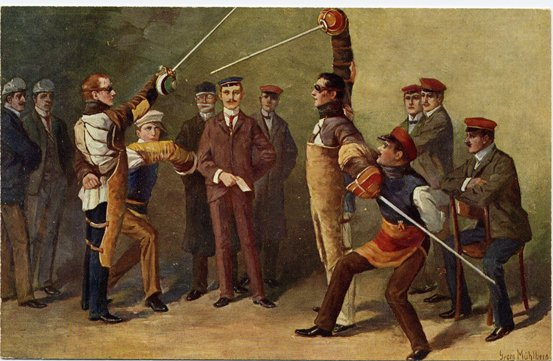
- Mensur fencing in Heidelberg, 1900
- Focus: Weaponry
- Country of origin: Germany
- Creator: Various
- Parenthood: German school of fencing
- Olympic sport: No

Academic fencing (German: akademisches Fechten) or Mensur is the traditional kind of fencing practised by some student corporations (Studentenverbindungen) in Germany, Austria, Switzerland, Latvia, Estonia, and, to a minor extent, in Belgium, Lithuania, and Poland. It is a traditional, strictly regulated sabre fight between two male members of different fraternities with sharp weapons. The German technical term Mensur (from Latin meaning 'measure, a certain quantity') in the 16th century referred to the specified distance between each of the fencers.

== Technique ==
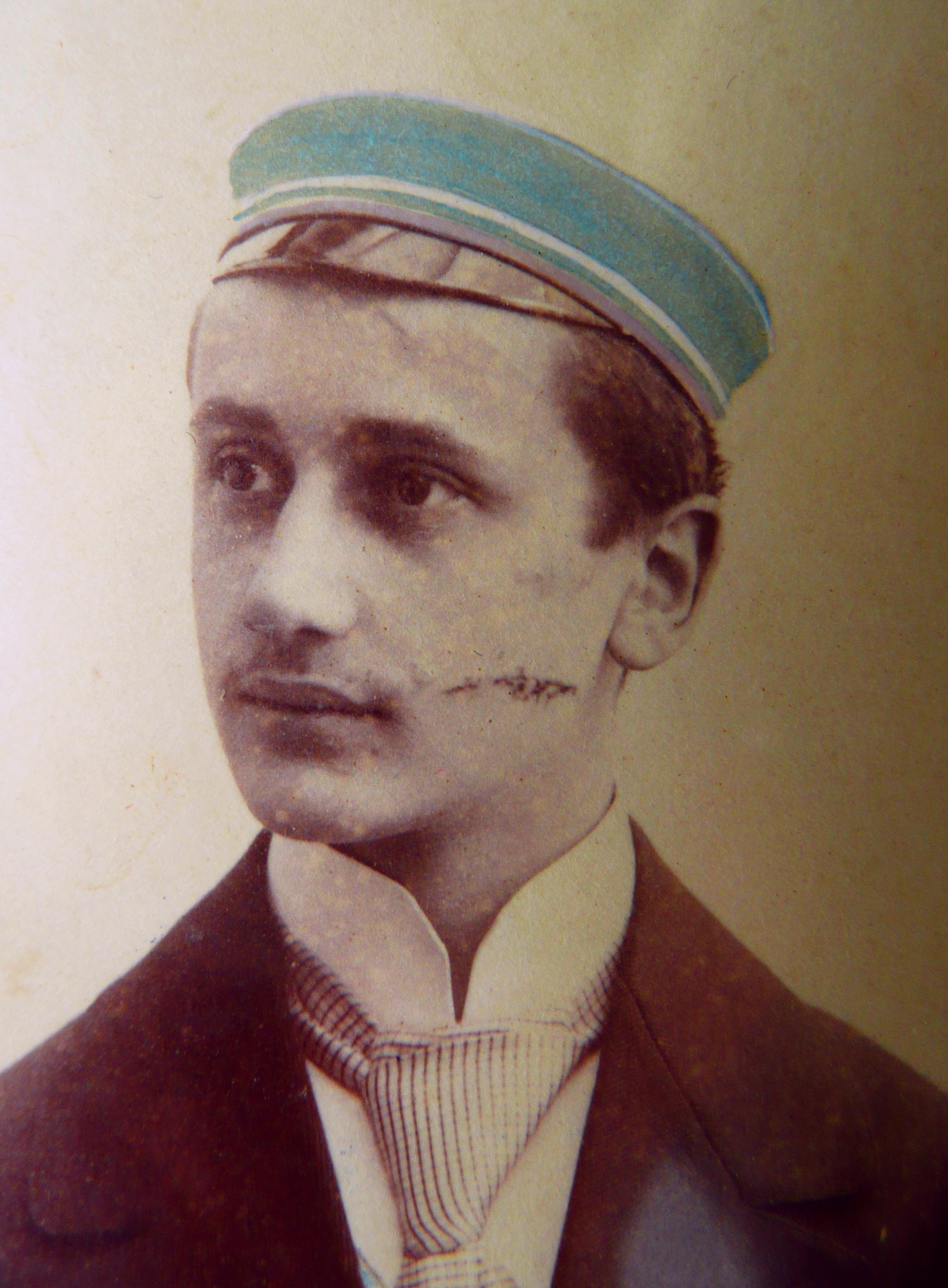
An 1896 picture of Adolf Hoffmann-Heyden, a German Corpsstudent, showing an extensive fresh fencing scar and some minor old ones

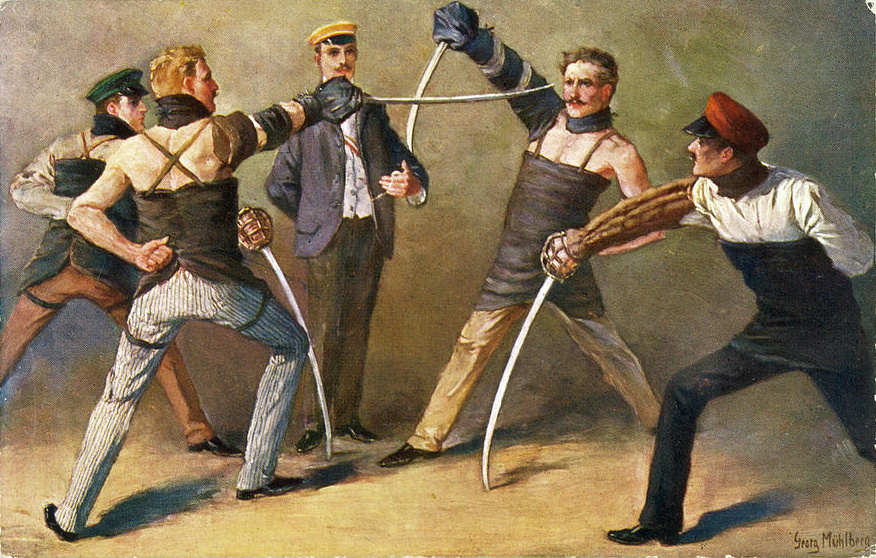
Student sabre duel, 1900

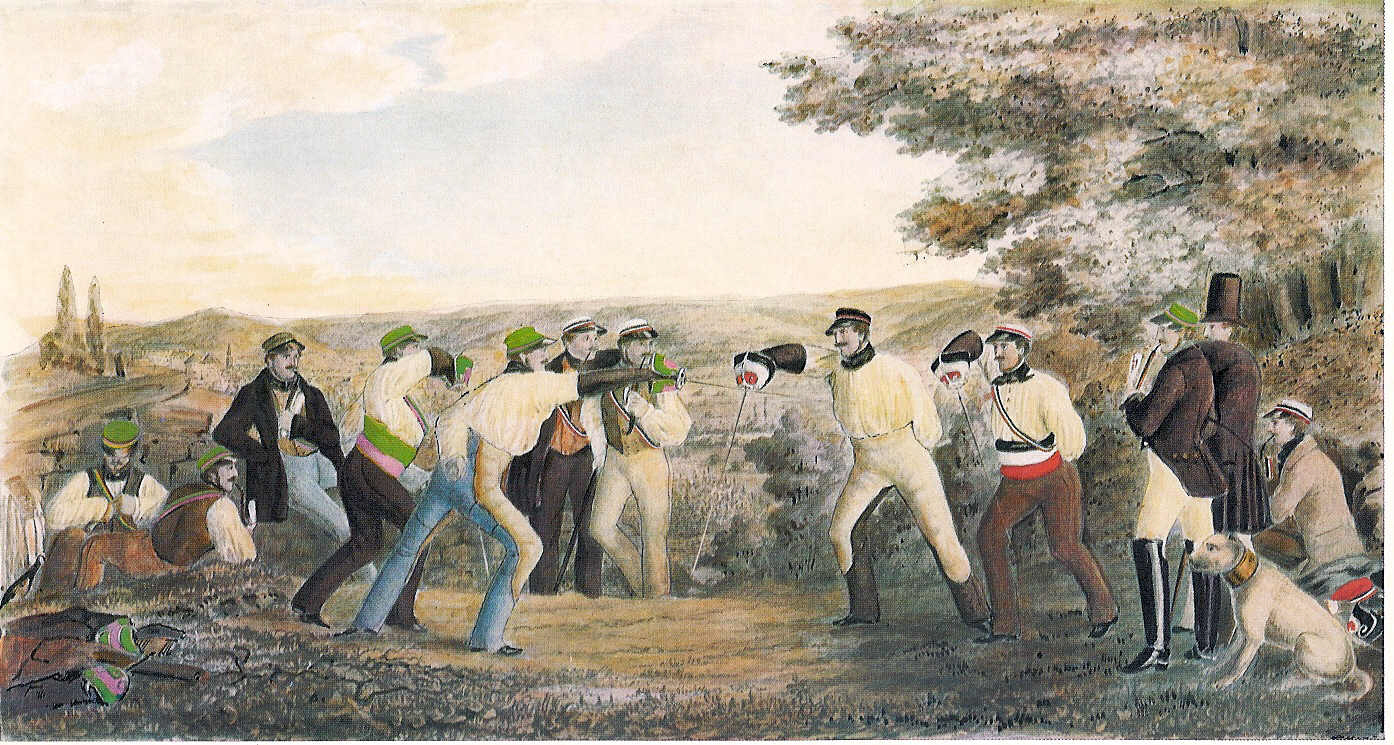
Mensur fencing with Korbschlägern in Tübingen in 1831

Modern academic fencing, the Mensur, is neither a duel nor a sport. It is a traditional way of training and educating character and personality; thus, in a modern Mensur bout, there is neither winner nor loser, although historically the winner was the one who managed to leave a cut on his opponent's face. In contrast to sports fencing, the participants stand their ground at a fixed distance - typically one sword's length. At the beginning of the tradition, duelers wore only their normal clothing (as duels sometimes would arise spontaneously) or light-cloth armor on the arm, torso, and throat. In recent years, fencers are protected by mail or padding for the body, fencing arm, fencing hand (gauntlet) and the throat, completed by steel goggles with a nose guard. In Austria and Switzerland, a nose guard is uncommon. Opponents fence at arm's length and stand more or less in one place, while attempting to hit the unprotected areas of their opponent's face and head. Flinching or dodging is not allowed, the goal being less to avoid injury than to endure it stoically. Two physicians are present (one for each opponent) to attend to injuries and stop the fight if necessary. Each fencer would also have a second present to ensure the opponent does not break any rules, and to parry their own fencer's blade when the umpire called halt.

The participants, or Paukanten, use specially developed swords. The so-called Mensurschläger (or simply Schläger) exists in two versions. The most common weapon is the Korbschläger with a basket-type guard. Some universities use the so-called Glockenschläger (lit. 'bell hitter'), which is equipped with a bell-shaped guard. These universities are Leipzig, Berlin, Greifswald, Dresden, Tharandt (in the Forestry College, which is now part of Technische Universität Dresden), Halle on the Saale, Frankfurt-an-der-Oder, and Freiberg. In Jena, both Korbschläger and Glockenschläger are used. Studentenverbindungen from some western cities use Glockenschläger because their tradition had its origin in one of the eastern universities but moved to West Germany after World War II.

The scar resulting from a hit is called a "smite" (German: Schmiss), and was seen as a badge of honour, especially in the second half of the 19th century and the first half of the 20th. Nowadays the presence of scars usually indicates a mistake and therefore are no longer considered especially dignified. Today, it is not easy for an outsider to identify Mensur scars due to better medical treatment. Also, the number of mandatory Mensuren was reduced in the second half of the 20th century. Most Mensur scars are located on the left temple of the forehead. Scars on the cheek and chin are rather uncommon today and sometimes due to accidents.

== History ==
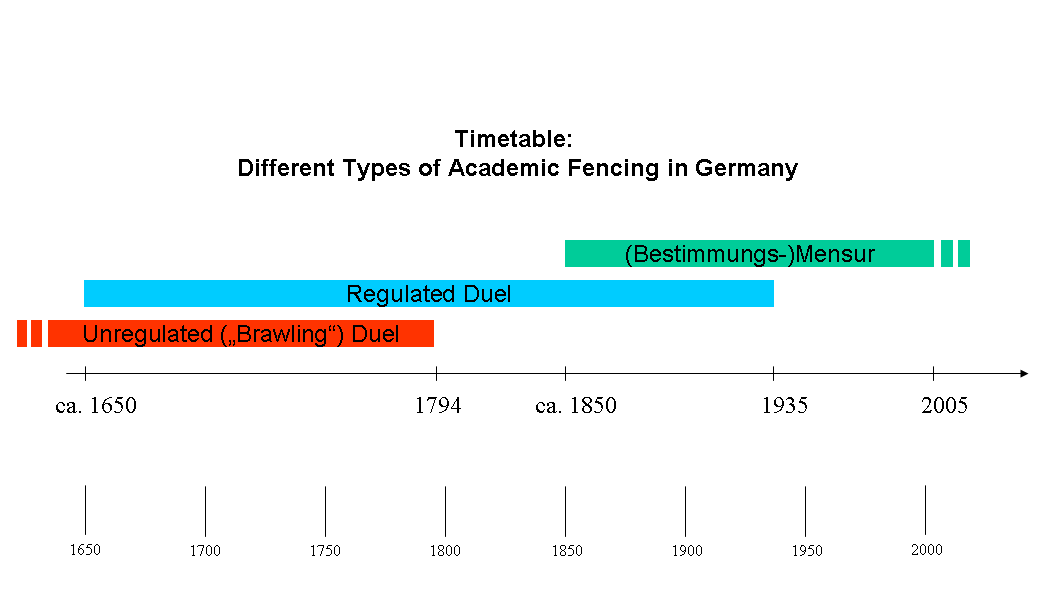
Timeline of academic fencing in Germany

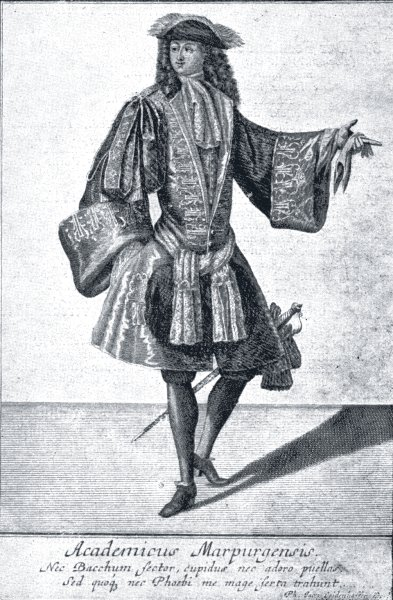
Marburg student of about 1700

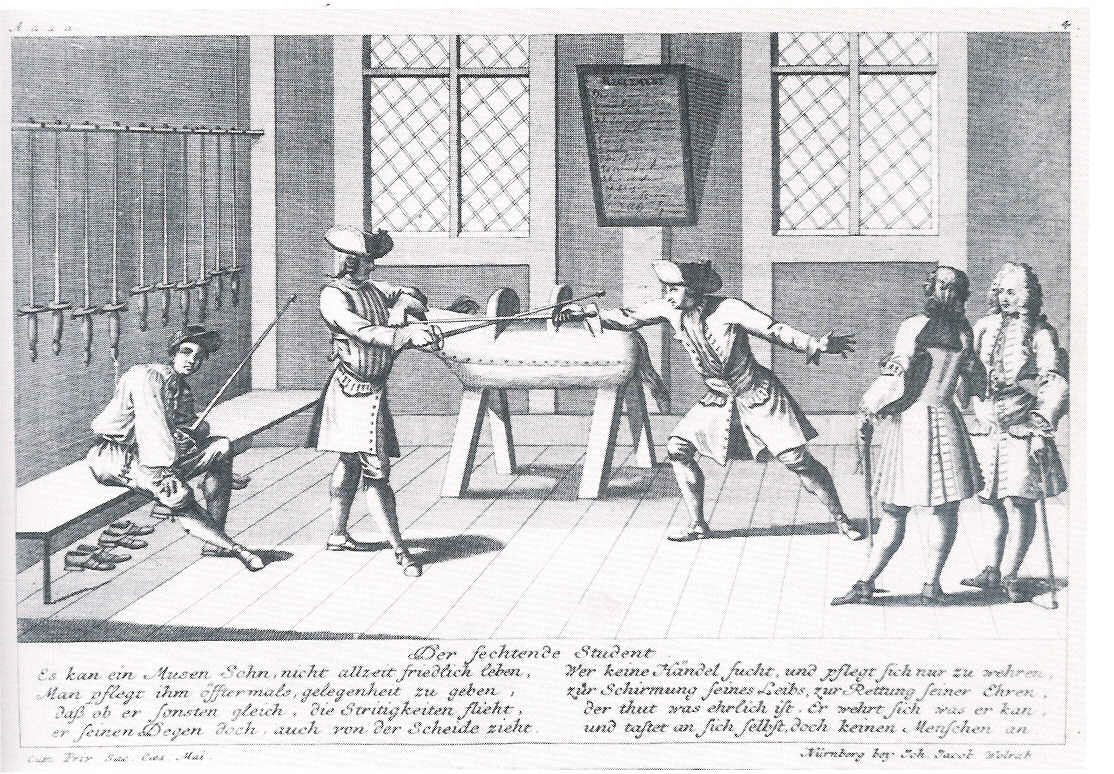
Fencing lesson at the university fencing school in Altdorf, 1725

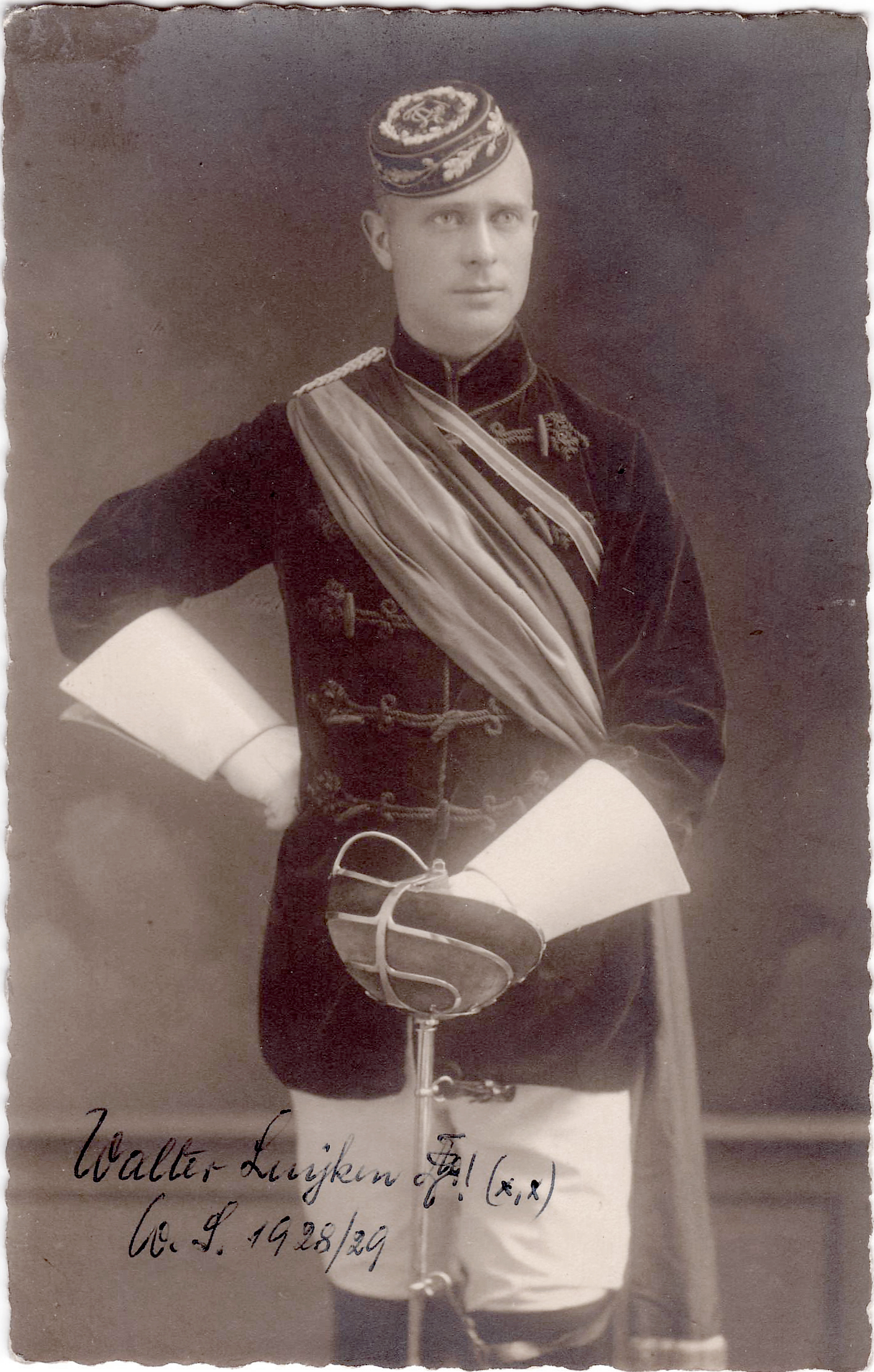
Corporate student of the "Agronomia" in Bonn 1928/1929

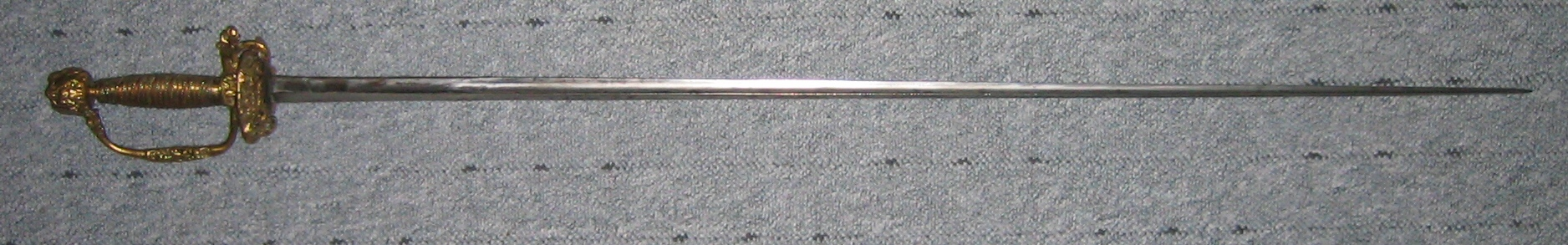
Typical smallsword of the 1740s

Starting in Spain at the end of the 15th century, the dueling sword (rapier) became a regular part of the attire of noblemen throughout Europe. In the Holy Roman Empire, this became usual among students, as well. Brawling and fighting were regular occupations of students in the German-speaking areas during the early modern period. In line with developments in the aristocracy and the military, regulated duels were introduced to the academic environment, as well. The basis of this was the conviction that being a student meant being something different from the rest of the population. Students wore special clothes, developed special kinds of festivities, sang student songs, and fought duels, sometimes spontaneously (so-called rencontre, French "meeting" or "combat"), sometimes according to strict regulations called comment (French "how"). The weapons used were the same as those employed in civilian dueling, being at first the rapier and later the smallsword (court sword, dress sword, French: épée de cour, German: Kostümdegen, Galanteriedegen), which was seen as part of the dress and always at hand as a side arm.

Student life was quite unsafe in these years, especially in the 16th and 17th centuries during the Reformation wars and the Thirty Years' War (1618–1648), when a major part of the German population was killed. Public life was brutal and students killing each other in the street was not uncommon.

A major step towards civilization was the introduction of the "regulated" duel, of which the first recordings exist from the 17th century. The fight was not decided on the spot, but the time and location were appointed and negotiations were done by officials. A so-called Kartellträger did the arrangements and a "second" represented the interests of the fighter during the duel and could even give physical protection from illegal actions. A kind of referee was present to make decisions, and eventually, the practice of having an attending doctor became normal so as to give medical help in case of an injury.

At the end of the 18th century (after the French Revolution), wearing weapons in everyday life fell out of fashion and was more and more forbidden, even for students. This certainly reduced the number of spontaneous duels dramatically. The regulated duel remained in use, though still forbidden.

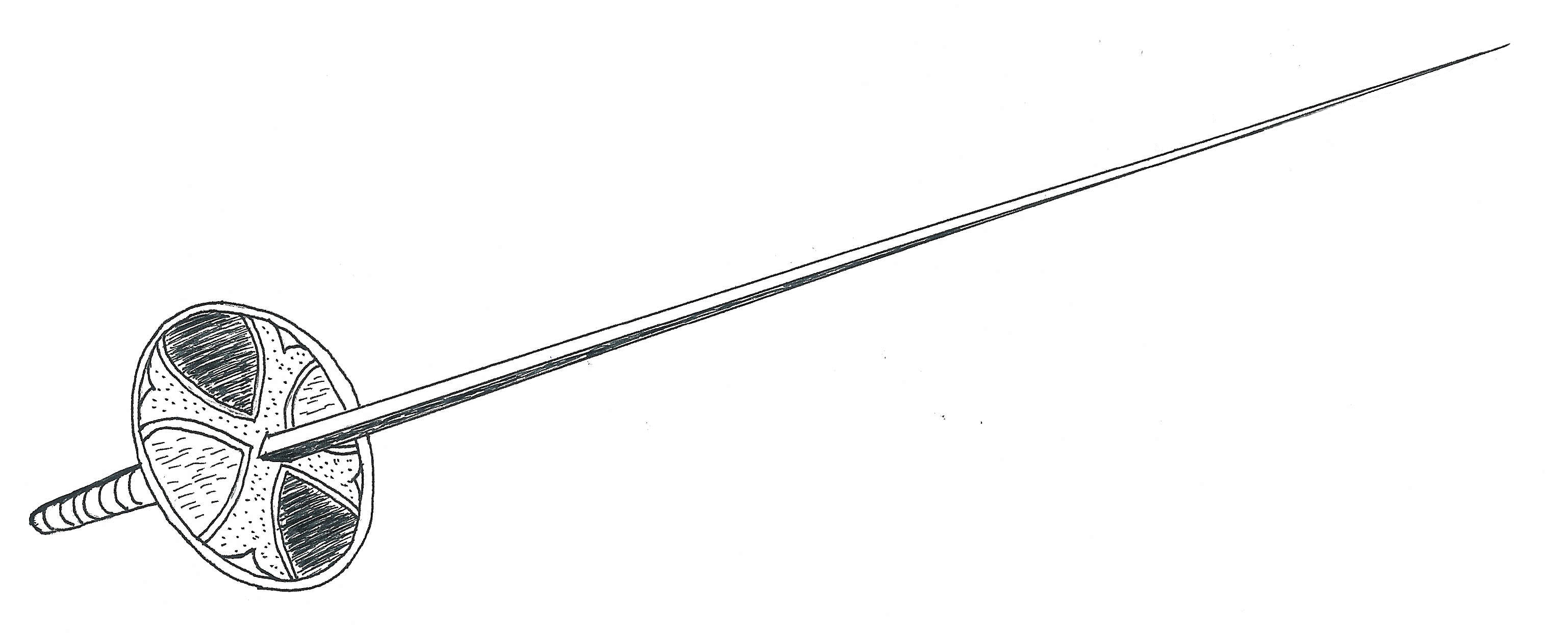
Pariser small sword, derived from the French foil

The foil was invented in France as a training weapon in the middle of the 18th century to practice fast and elegant thrust fencing. Fencers blunted the point by wrapping a foil around the blade or fastening a knob on the point ("blossom", French: fleuret). In addition to practising, some fencers took away the protection and used the sharp foil for duels. German students took up that practice and developed the Pariser ("Parisian") thrusting small sword for the Stoßmensur ("thrusting mensur"). After the dress sword was abolished, the Pariser became the only weapon for academic thrust fencing in Germany.

Since fencing on thrust with a sharp point is quite dangerous, many students died from their lungs being pierced (Lungenfuchser), which made breathing difficult or impossible. However, the counter-movement had already started in Göttingen in the 1760s. Here the Göttinger Hieber was invented, the predecessor of the modern Korbschläger, a new weapon for cut fencing. In the following years, the Glockenschläger was invented in east German universities for cut fencing as well.

Thrust fencing (using Pariser) and cut fencing (using Korbschläger or Glockenschläger) existed in parallel in Germany during the first decades of the 19th century—with local preferences. Thrust fencing was especially popular in Jena, Erlangen, Würzburg, and Ingolstadt/Landshut, two towns where the predecessors of LMU Munich were located. The last thrust Mensur is recorded to have taken place in Würzburg in 1860.

Until the first half of the 19th century, all types of academic fencing can be seen as duels, since all fencing with sharp weapons was about honour. No combat with sharp blades took place without a formal insult. Compared to pistol duels, these events were relatively harmless. The fight regularly ended when a contestant received a wound at least one inch long that produced at least one drop of blood. It was not uncommon for students to have fought approximately 10 to 30 duels of that kind during their university years. The German student Fritz Bacmeister is the 19th-century record holder, due to his estimated 100 mensur bouts fought in Göttingen, Jena, and Würzburg between 1860 and 1866. In the 20th and 21st century it was Alexander Kliesch (Landsmannschaft Brandenburg Berlin) with 70.

For duels with nonstudents, e.g., military officers, the "academic sabre" became usual, apparently derived from the military sabre. It was a heavy weapon with a curved blade and a hilt similar to the Korbschläger.

During the first half of the 19th century and some of the 18th century, students believed the character of a person could easily be judged by watching him fight with sharp blades under strict regulations. Academic fencing was more and more seen as a kind of personality training by showing countenance and fairness even in dangerous situations. Student corporations demanded their members fight at least one duel with sharp blades during their university time. The problem was that some peaceful students had nobody to offend them. The solution was a kind of formal insult that did not actually infringe honour, but was just seen as a challenge for fencing. The standard wording was dummer Junge (German for "stupid boy.")

In the long term, this solution was unsatisfying. Around 1850, the Bestimmungsmensur (German bestimmen means "ascertain", "define" or "determine") was developed and introduced throughout Germany. This meant the opponents of a Mensur were determined by the fencing official of their corporations. These officials were regularly vice-chairmen (Consenior) and responsible for arranging Mensur bouts in cooperation with their colleagues from other corporations. Their objective was to find opponents of equal physical and fencing capabilities to make the event challenging for both participants. That is the way it is still done today and is the concept of the Mensur in the modern sense of the word.

Before the Communist revolution in Russia and before World War II, academic fencing was known in most countries of Eastern Europe, as well.

== Modern Mensur ==
Members of a student corps with Mensur swords (Czernowitz, c. 1890).

By the end of the 19th century, the duelling form evolved into the modern Mensur. In 1884, the British Saturday Review described the duelling as follows:

In the German Schläger combat the position is the same as in back-swording, save that the left arm is kept, as in sabre play, behind the body; commonly the waistband of the trousers is grasped by the left hand. The weapon is a long, narrow blade, like a pointless rapier, but much more flexible. It is sharpened for a length of twenty centimetres (say eight inches) on the true edge, and five on the false edge. For practice and instruction blunt and rather stouter blades are used. The mask is like an English single-stick mask, but stronger and heavier. A padded leather vest, coming almost down to the knees, covers the body, and the right arm is encased in a sleeve attached to a gauntlet, which may be compared to an elongated Rugby football. In the actual duel, there is an even more elaborate system of defence; the right wrist is guarded with a ring of mail, and the arm with folds of silk, which, like the turban of the East, are enough to stop an ordinary cut. Practically, though not according to strict rules, the body is altogether covered. The eyes are protected by iron spectacles, with a strong wire net instead of glasses.

During the times of the Third Reich, the national socialist leadership initially legalized the practice in 1935, but would again forbid it 1937 as part of the broader crackdown on independent student organizations, which included the Studentenverbindung. As Nazi pressure increased and fraternities were forced to officially suspend their activities, so-called comradeships were founded. These provided means for practising and organising the Mensur among former fraternities while remaining undetected to the Nazi secret police. One such example was the SC-Comradeship Hermann Löns initiated by members of the Corps Hubertia Freiburg and other fraternities in Freiburg, Germany. There, fencing Mensur "duels" continued and even intensified from 1941 on, with over 100 of such duels happening during World War II in Freiburg alone. Following the war, most of the formerly suspended fraternities were reactivated and resumed the traditions of Mensur fencing if they had not continued throughout the time of Nazi rule.

Today, the Mensur is practised by about 400 traditional Studentenverbindung fraternities in Germany, several of the Corps, Burschenschaften, Landsmannschaften, Turnerschaften, and Sängerschaften. Menzura, as the Mensur is known in Poland, is still practised, although its popularity has declined since the end of World War II. It is also still known in a few other European countries, though there, protective equipment use is extensive and duelling scars are almost unheard of. Altogether, there are approximately 3500 active members of corps in Germany, Austria, and Switzerland alone, as well as at least 21,000 alumni.

== In popular culture ==
=== Literature ===
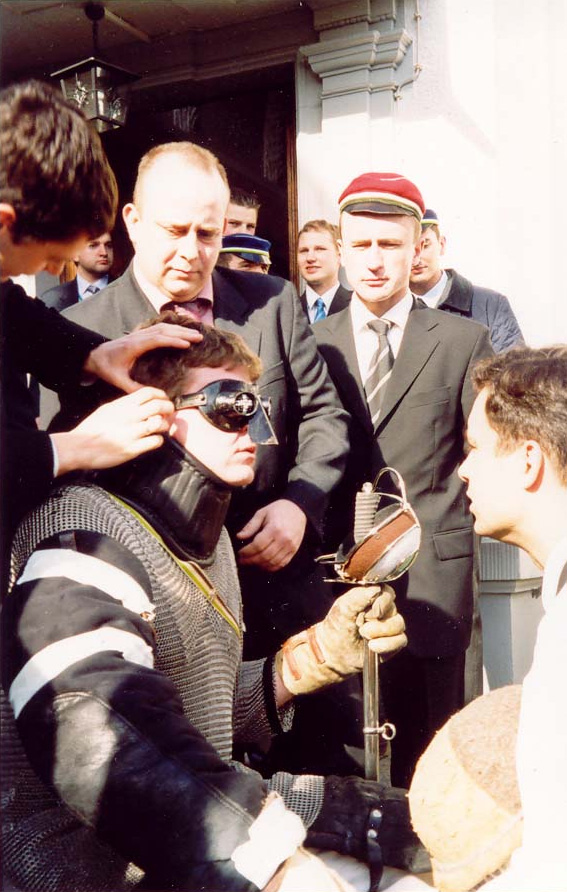
Preparations for a Mensur; here between members of a Polish Corporation Sarmatia and a German fraternity (Freiburg im Breisgau, 2004)

American traveller Mark Twain devoted several chapters of A Tramp Abroad (1880) to Heidelberg students' fencing.

In Three Men on the Bummel (1900), Jerome K. Jerome devoted a chapter to German student life, and describes the "German Mensur" in detail. While much of the book has a tone of admiration for the German people, he expressed extreme disapproval for this tradition.

In George MacDonald Fraser's Royal Flash (1970), the protagonist Harry Flashman is scarred with a Schläger as part of his disguise as a Danish prince.

Mensur is featured in Heinrich Mann's novel Man of Straw (Der Untertan).

Mensur scars are repeatedly noted and described as a sign of beauty and manliness by German characters in Katherine Anne Porter's novel Ship of Fools.

Mensur scars are mentioned in passing in Robert Heinlein's Starship Troopers when two German recruits are asked at the beginning of boot camp where they got their scars. The drill sergeant even uses the term Corpsbruder (as spelled in modern German). E. C. Gordon, the hero of Heinlein's Glory Road, mentions his desire for a degree from Heidelberg and the dueling scars to go with it.

In the James Bond books by Ian Fleming, the supervillain Ernst Stavro Blofeld has a duelling scar below his eye.

=== Film ===
The Mensur is featured in a number of German films, notably:

- Hans Westmar – Einer von Vielen (Hans Westmar – One of Many), 1933
- Der Untertan, 1951

and less commonly in films outside Germany, such as

- The Life and Death of Colonel Blimp, 1943

=== Television ===
- In episode 77 of Roald Dahl's Tales of the Unexpected, "The Vorpal Blade", the story revolves around duelling of this kind
- In Freud, duelling is shown and many characters have scars from duelling.

== See also ==
- Dueling scars
- German school of fencing
