= Corps Marko-Guestphalia Aachen =

German student fraternal organization

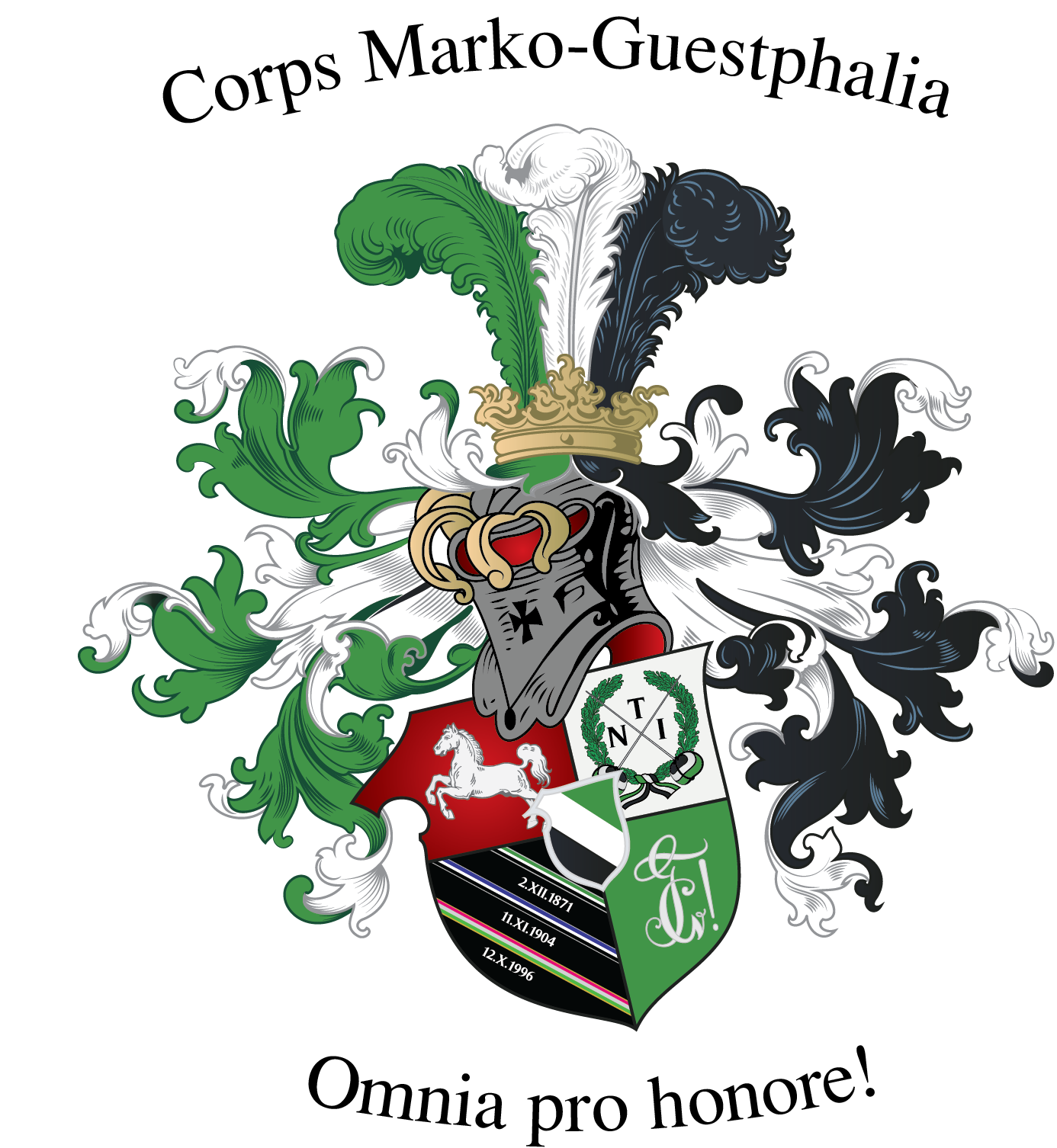
- Founded: December 2, 1871; 153 years ago RWTH Aachen, FH Aachen
- Type: German Student Corps
- Affiliation: WSC
- Status: Active
- Scope: Local
- Motto: Omnia pro honore! Fencing: Nosce te ipsum!
- Colors

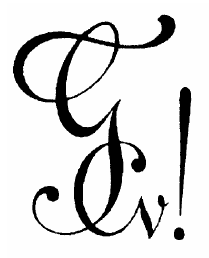
- Zirkel
- Chapters: 1
- Members: ~300 active
- Headquarters: Moreller Weg 64; Aachen 52074; Germany
- Website: www.guteverbindung.de

The Corps Marko-Guestphalia Aachen is a fraternity (Studentenverbindung) in Aachen, Germany, founded on December 2, 1871. It is one of 162 German Student Corps in Germany, Austria, Switzerland, Belgium, Latvia and Hungary today. The Corps is a member of the Weinheimer Senioren-Convent (WSC), the second oldest federation of classical European fraternal corporations, with roots dating back to the 15th century and fraternities founded in several European countries.

Membership in the fraternity is open to honorable men studying at one of Aachen's universities and is based exclusively on personality, good moral standing, and strength of character. Members of the Corps Marko-Guestphalia value and engage in the tradition of academic fencing as a way to sharpen and prove their character under pressure. Continuing a practice dating back into the 1700s, Marko-Guestphalia's members wear the traditional couleur, colored stripes, in green-white-black. The fraternity teaches and expects tolerance from its members, stemming from diverse ethnic, national, religious and political backgrounds. While many of their members stem from the west-Rhine region of Germany, Marko-Guestphalia enjoys a strong membership of international students (examples include Denmark, India, Italia, Serbia, Turkey, USA, Peru), similar to the internationally very open character of the RWTH.

== Fundamentals and principles ==
Like all German Student Corps, Marko-Guestphalia expects tolerance from its members in political, scientific and religious affairs. Members are encouraged to have their own point of view about the world and be able to argue it, but Marko-Guestphalia as an entity always remains neutral. This neutrality is a fundamental pillar of all Corps and differentiates them from fraternities who require a certain political or religious affinity. The fraternity encourages freshly admitted (pledging "fox") members with diverse ethnic, national, religious and political backgrounds to prove themselves as valuable Corps brothers, purely on the basis of personal character and merit, before becoming eligible to be fully incorporated (Rezeption). The fraternity has about 300 members of all ages (including alumni) coming from or currently residing in Europe, Asia, the Americas and Africa. Every full member is a member for life.

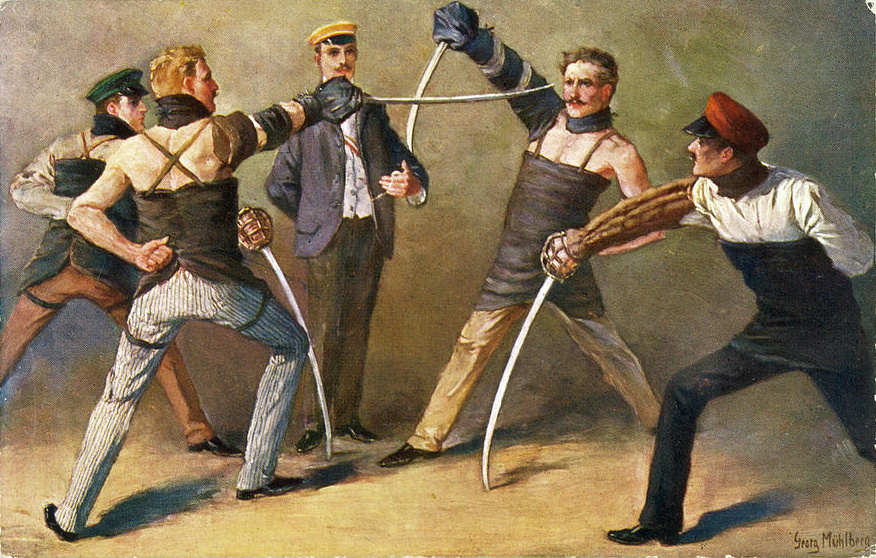
Academic "Mensur" fencing in 1900. Steel goggles provide added protection nowadays.

Members of the Corps Marko-Guestphalia value and practice the tradition of engagements in academic fencing, or "Mensur" in German, with members of other old-school fraternities. Academic fencing, originating in the German school of fencing, is understood as a way to exercise good judgement and prove character, allowing participants to show determination by standing their ground under pressure, while enhancing the bonds between the Corps brothers at the same time. Mark Twain described one of these fencing duels/challenges in his day and age; his description is remarkably similar to current practices. Marko-Guestphalia's members identify themselves wearing the traditional couleur, colored stripes, as well as caps and/or other specific garments at official occasions. This tradition, known as "wearing colors" (German: Farben tragen), provides means to recognize members of other fraternities and, likewise, identification for the Corps brothers with each other and their traditions.

Activity and responsibility are two fundamental expectations for fraternity members. With the goal to achieve members who are prepared to become active leaders in society, every Corps brother is expected to hold a leadership position at least once for a term ("Semester") while a student. Members are further encouraged to organize internal and open fraternity events that draw attention from other fraternities and guests from industry, academia, politics and other active societies. Allocating the necessary resources appropriately and living up to set expectations teaches responsibility. All members must show active participation in the regular fraternity Convents, providing the foundation for the fraternity's members to meet and discuss past, present and future developments. Decisions are cast in a democratic manner, sometimes after intense debates. Participation at such Convents teaches a better understanding of proper argumentation, group dynamics and critical analysis of other members' views, plans and arguments, thereby preparing its participants to become active members of society. Similarly, every member must finish his higher educational degree with good academic standing in order to advance to the status of Alter Herr (alumnus).

Long-term guidance is expected from and provided by said Alte Herren, who often remain very engaged and well connected with the fraternity. Every year at the end of May, student and alumni members of all German Student Corps meet in one of two cities (Weinheim and Bad Kösen) for three days to refresh their bonds with their fraternity and friends from the entire Corps network (WSC/KSCV). In addition to these international meetings once a year, alumni join the student members for multiple local meetings, lasting an evening or a weekend. These regular meetings result in strong bonds spanning the generations within the fraternity.

== History ==
=== Foundation ===
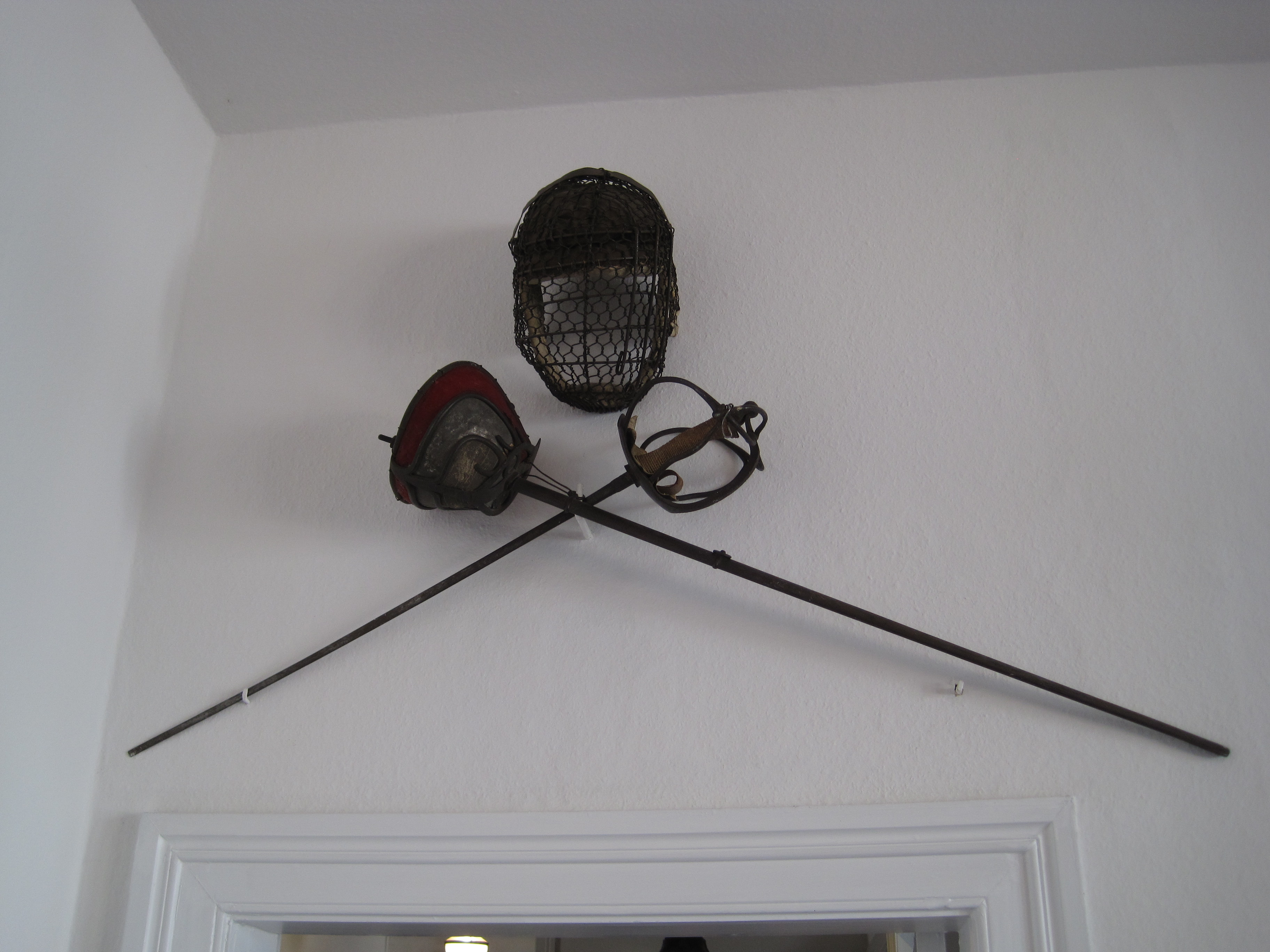
Bismarck's student sword and helmet, comparable to those used by the fraternity's members then and now.

The fraternity was founded by three fraternity students of other fraternities on December 2, 1871 who had come to the Royal Rheinian-Westphalian Polytechnical School at Aachen for their graduate studies. The fraternity grew quickly and joined the Weinheimer Senioren-Convent (WSC) on May 17, 1872.

=== Today ===
The fraternity has official relationships with the Corps Saxo-Thuringia München in Munich and a close relationship with the other Corps of the Blaues Kartell with member fraternities Corps Altsachsen Dresden, Corps Hannoverania Hanover and Corps Berlin.

== Symbols ==
The fraternity's motto is Omnia pro honore!. Its fencing motto is Nosce te ipsum!. Its colors are green, black, and white.

== Literature ==
- Lees Knowles: A day with corps-students in Germany
- Mark Twain describes his encounters with German corps students in chapters IV to VII of his travelogue A Tramp Abroad.
- Mark Twain describes specifically the fencing scene in A Tramp Abroad.
- Secondary web source of Mark Twain's descriptions of his encounters with German corps students in chapters IV to VII of his travelogue A Tramp Abroad.
- LaVaque-Manty, Mika (2006). "Dueling for Equality: Masculine Honor and the Modern Politics of Dignity" (PDF). Political Theory. 34 (6): 715–740. doi:10.1177/0090591706291727. S2CID 143261653.
- Gay, Peter (April 1992). "Mensur: The Cherished Scar". The Yale Review. 80 (1–2). ISBN 9780393033984.
- Paulgerhard Gladen: Die Kösener und Weinheimer Corps. Ihre Darstellung in Einzelchroniken. WJK-Verlag, Hilden 2007, ISBN 3-933892-24-4, S. 91–92.
- Hans Schüler: Weinheimer S.C.-Chronik, Darmstadt 1927, S. 434-454
- Michael Doeberl u. a. (Hrsg.): Das akademische Deutschland, Band 2: Die deutschen Hochschulen und ihre akademischen Bürger, Berlin 1931, S. 735
- Rolf-Joachim Baum: "Wir wollen Männer, wir wollen Taten!" – Deutsche Corpsstudenten 1848 bis heute. Berlin 1998, S. 7–12. ISBN 3-88680-653-7
- Paulgerhard Gladen: Geschichte der studentischen Korporationsverbände, Band 1, S. 53, Würzburg 1981
- Paulgerhard Gladen (2007), Die Kösener und Weinheimer Corps: Ihre Darstellung in Einzelchroniken (in German) (1. ed.), Hilden: WJK-Verlag, p. 200, ISBN 978-3-933892-24-9
