= Corps Saxo-Thuringia München =

German student fraternal organization

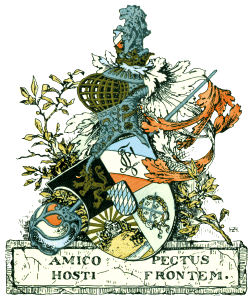
- Founded: March 15, 1882; 144 years ago near Stuttgart, Germany
- Type: Studentenverbindung
- Affiliation: WSC
- Status: Active
- Scope: National
- Motto: Post nubila phoebus! Fencing: Amico pectus, hosti frontem!
- Colors: Light Blue, White and Orange, with silver borders
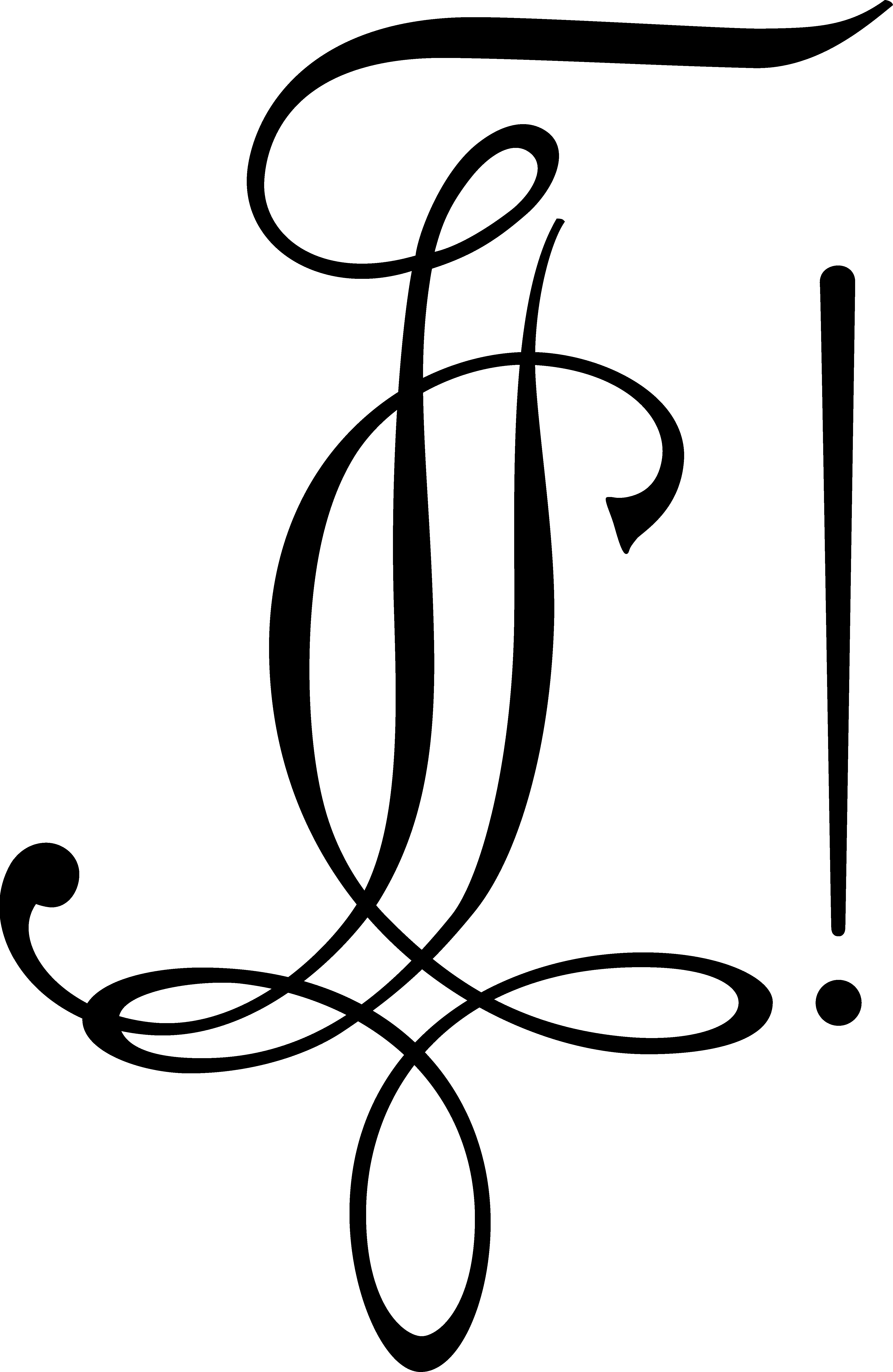
- Zirkel
- Chapters: 2
- Headquarters: Königinstraße 20; München 80539; Germany
- Website: www.corps-saxo-thuringia.de

The Corps Saxo-Thuringia München is a fraternity (Studentenverbindung) in Munich, Germany, founded on March 15, 1882. It is one of 162 German Student Corps in Germany, Austria, Switzerland, Belgium, Latvia and Hungary today. The Corps is a member of the Weinheimer Senioren-Convent (WSC), the second oldest federation of classical European fraternal corporations, with roots dating back to the 15th century and fraternities founded in several European countries.

Membership in the fraternity is open to honorable men studying at one of Munich's universities and is based exclusively on personality, good moral standing, and strength of character. Members of the Corps Saxo-Thuringia value and engage in the tradition of academic fencing as a way to sharpen and prove their character under pressure.

== Fundamentals and principles ==
Like all German Student Corps, Saxo-Thuringia expects tolerance from its members in political, scientific and religious affairs. Members are encouraged to have their own point of view about the world and be able to argue it, but Saxo-Thuringia as an entity always remains neutral. This neutrality is a fundamental pillar of all Corps and differentiates them from fraternities who require a certain political or religious affinity. The fraternity encourages freshly admitted (pledging "fox") members with diverse ethnic, national, religious and political backgrounds to prove themselves as valuable Corps brothers, purely on the basis of personal character and merit, before becoming eligible to be fully incorporated (Rezeption). The fraternity has about 200 members of all ages (including alumni) coming from or currently residing in Europe, Asia, the Americas and Africa. Every full member is a member for life.

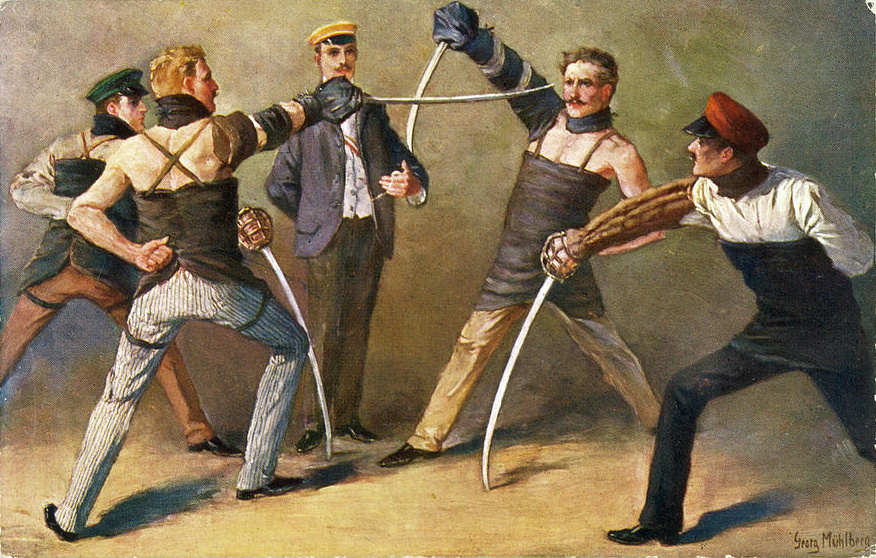
Academic "Mensur" fencing in 1900. Steel goggles provide added protection nowadays.

Members of the Corps Saxo-Thuringia value and practice the tradition of engagements in academic fencing, or "Mensur" in German, with members of other old-school fraternities. Academic fencing, originating in the German school of fencing, is understood as a way to exercise good judgement and prove character, allowing participants to show determination by standing their ground under pressure, while enhancing the bonds between the Corps brothers at the same time. Mark Twain described one of these fencing duels/challenges in his day and age; his description is remarkably similar to current practices. Saxo-Thuringia's members identify themselves wearing the traditional couleur, colored stripes, as well as caps and/or other specific garments at official occasions. This tradition, known as "wearing colors" (German: Farben tragen), provides means to recognize members of other fraternities and, likewise, identification for the Corps brothers with each other and their traditions.

Activity and responsibility are two fundamental expectations for fraternity members. With the goal to achieve members who are prepared to become active leaders in society, every Corps brother is expected to hold a leadership position at least once for a term ("Semester") while a student. Members are further encouraged to organize internal and open fraternity events that draw attention from other fraternities and guests from industry, academia, politics and other active societies. Allocating the necessary resources appropriately and living up to set expectations teaches responsibility. All members must show active participation in the regular fraternity Convents, providing the foundation for the fraternity's members to meet and discuss past, present and future developments. Decisions are cast in a democratic manner, sometimes after intense debates. Participation at such Convents teaches a better understanding of proper argumentation, group dynamics and critical analysis of other members' views, plans and arguments, thereby preparing its participants to become active members of society. Similarly, every member must finish his higher educational degree with good academic standing in order to advance to the status of Alter Herr (alumnus).

Long-term guidance is expected from and provided by said Alte Herren, who often remain very engaged and well connected with the fraternity. Every year at the end of May, student and alumni members of all German Student Corps meet in one of two cities (Weinheim and Bad Kösen) for three days to refresh their bonds with their fraternity and friends from the entire Corps network (WSC/KSCV). In addition to these international meetings once a year, alumni join the student members for multiple local meetings, lasting an evening or a weekend. These regular meetings result in strong bonds spanning the generations within the fraternity.

== History ==
=== Landsmannschaft Nicaria from 1882 until 1910 ===
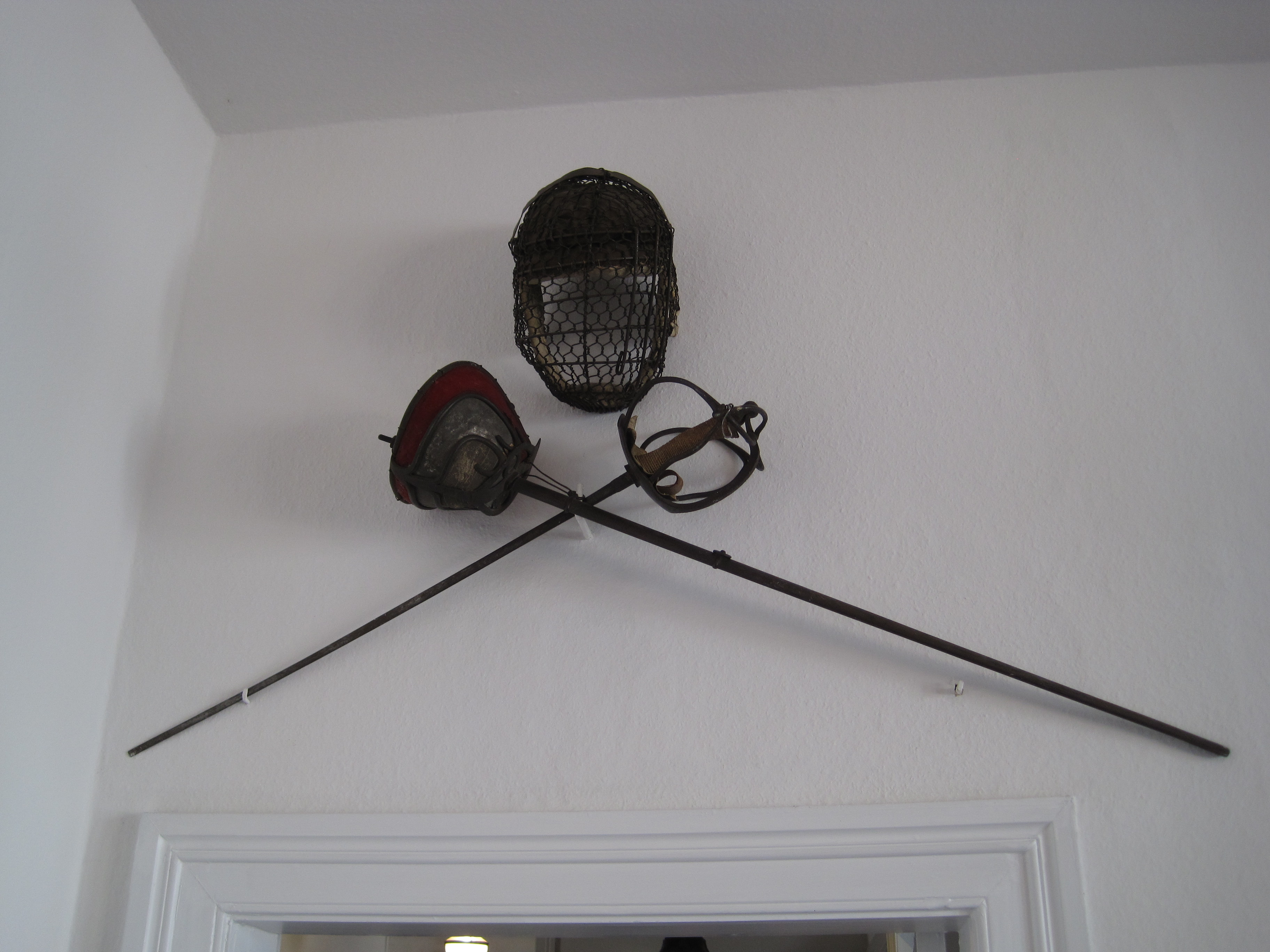
Bismarck's student sword and helmet, comparable to those used by the fraternity's members then and now.

One half of the current fraternity was founded as Landsmannschaft Nicaria featuring the colors „Light blue - white - orange" and the Motto "Post Nubila Phoebus" (Sunshine follows rain) and the fencing motto "Amico pectus, hosti frontem" (Arm your friend, confront your enemy) on March 15, 1882, near Stuttgart.

=== Landsmannschaft Thuringia from 1898 until 1902 ===
The other half of the current fraternity was founded as Landsmannschaft Thuringia on November 2, 1898 with the colors "Black - Gold - Blue" in Munich. The motto was "Einigkeit macht stark“ (strength through unity) and fencing motto "Nunquam Retrorsum" (never retreat). After joining the umbrella organization Rudolstädter SC (RSC) in 1885, the fraternity chose to rename itself to Saxo-Thuringia in 1899. Later that year the fraternity grew by incorporating several members of the similar corporation Alemania. While a member of the RSC, the fraternity joined the Blaues Kartell in 1899/1900.

=== Fusion of Nicaria and Saxo-Thuringia in 1902 and transition to becoming a Corps ===
The fraternity members belonging to the RSC decided in 1902 to seize being a Landsmannschaft and transitioned the fraternity to a Corps (German Student Corps). Following the closure of the veterninary university in Stuttgart in 1910, Nicaria's members moved to Munich and fused with the Corps Saxo-Thuringia on October 29, 1910. Nicaria contributed a part of the new crest, the colors („Light blue - White - Orange"), the mottos and the official founding date of the new fraternity. Saxo-Thuringia contributed the name, the post-nominal ("Zirkel") and remaining parts of the crest.

== Symbols ==
The fraternity's motto is Post nubila phoebus!; its fencing motto is Amico pectus, hosti frontem!.

Continuing a practice dating back into the 1700s, Saxo-Thuringia's members wear the traditional couleur, colored stripes, in light blue-white-orange. The fraternity teaches and expects tolerance from its members, stemming from diverse ethnic, national, religious and political backgrounds.

== Relationships with other fraternities ==
Corps Saxo-Thuringia is a member of the "Blaues Kartell", a circle of four German Student Corps that understand the union as "one fraternity spanning four cities" (Berlin, Dresden, Hanover, and Munich).
In chronological order. Links to the German Wikipedia are in process of being translated and currently indicated with "ge".

- Corps Hannoverania Hannover
- Corps Altsachsen Dresden
- Corps Berlin

The fraternity further has an official relationship with Corps Marko-Guestphalia Aachen since 2004 that has its origin in a fusion of Corps Albingia Aachen with the Corps Marko-Guestphalia in 1996. Corps Albingia had been reconstructed in Aachen after the second world war. Before the Nazis caused the German Student Corps to suspend activities in the 1930s, it flourished in Dresden where it had originally been founded on January 23, 1889. Corps Albingia Dresden was a former member of the Blaues Kartell.

== Literature ==
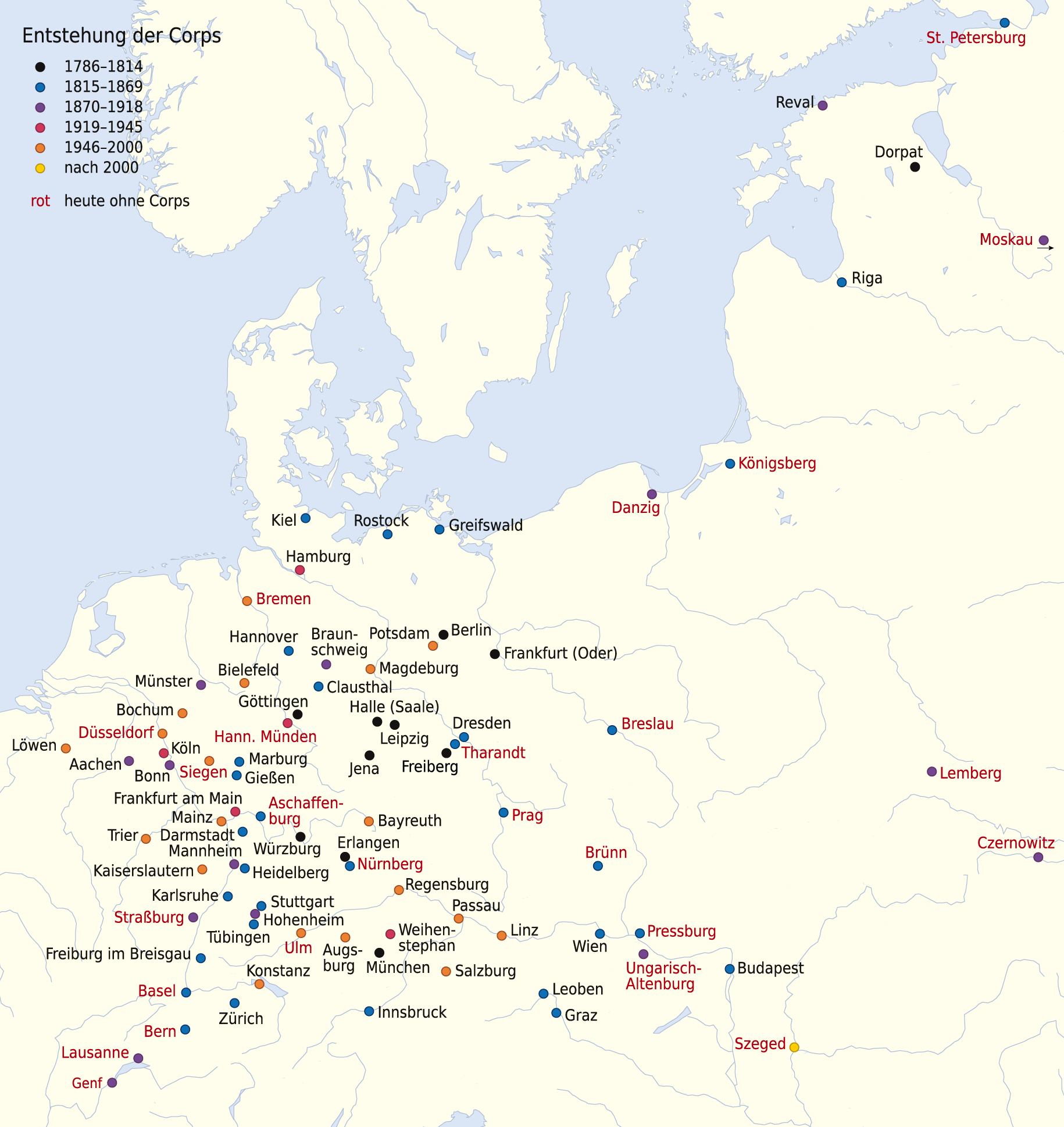
Map of the developing German Student Corps during the 18/19th century Europe.

- Lees Knowles: A day with corps-students in Germany
- Mark Twain describes his encounters with German corps students in chapters IV to VII of his travelogue A Tramp Abroad.
- Mark Twain describes specifically the fencing scene in A Tramp Abroad.
- Secondary web source of Mark Twain's descriptions of his encounters with German corps students in chapters IV to VII of his travelogue A Tramp Abroad.
- LaVaque-Manty, Mika (2006). "Dueling for Equality: Masculine Honor and the Modern Politics of Dignity" (PDF). Political Theory. 34 (6): 715–740. doi:10.1177/0090591706291727. S2CID 143261653.
- Gay, Peter (April 1992). "Mensur: The Cherished Scar". The Yale Review. 80 (1–2). ISBN 9780393033984.
- Paulgerhard Gladen: Die Kösener und Weinheimer Corps. Ihre Darstellung in Einzelchroniken. WJK-Verlag, Hilden 2007, ISBN 3-933892-24-4, S. 91–92.
- Hans Schüler: Weinheimer S.C.-Chronik, Darmstadt 1927, S. 434-454
- Michael Doeberl u. a. (Hrsg.): Das akademische Deutschland, Band 2: Die deutschen Hochschulen und ihre akademischen Bürger, Berlin 1931, S. 735
- Rolf-Joachim Baum: "Wir wollen Männer, wir wollen Taten!" – Deutsche Corpsstudenten 1848 bis heute. Berlin 1998, S. 7–12. ISBN 3-88680-653-7
- Paulgerhard Gladen: Geschichte der studentischen Korporationsverbände, Band 1, S. 53, Würzburg 1981
- Paulgerhard Gladen (2007), Die Kösener und Weinheimer Corps: Ihre Darstellung in Einzelchroniken (in German) (1. ed.), Hilden: WJK-Verlag, p. 200, ISBN 978-3-933892-24-9
