= Corps Altsachsen Dresden =

Fraternity in Dresden, Germany

Coordinates: 51°01′37″N 13°43′46″E

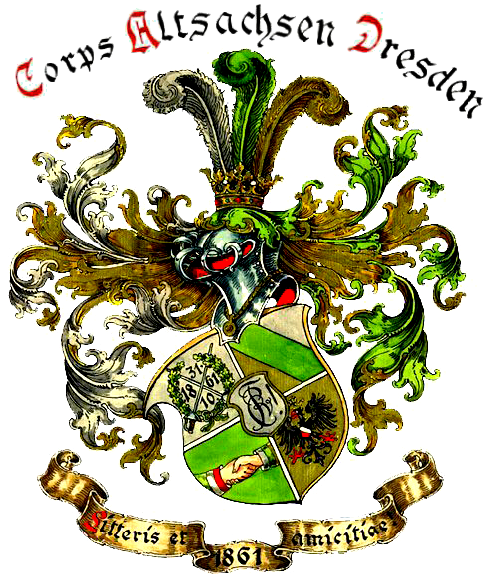
- Founded: October 31, 1861; 164 years ago Dresden University of Technology
- Type: German Student Corps
- Affiliation: WSC
- Status: Active
- Scope: International
- Motto: Litteris et amicitiae!
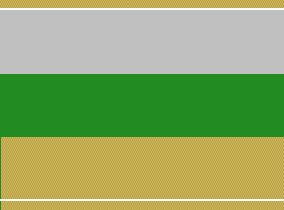
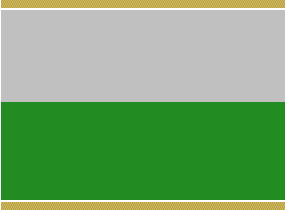
- Colors: Full members Pledge "Fuchs" members

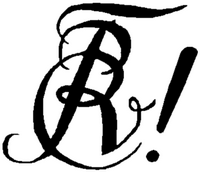
- Zirkel
- Publication: Altsachsen-Mitteilungen
- Chapters: 1 collegiate
- Headquarters: Weißbachstraße 1 Dresden 01069; Germany
- Website: www.altsachsen.de

The Corps Altsachsen is a fraternity (Studentenverbindung) in Dresden, Germany. It was founded on October 31, 1861, and is one of 162 German Student Corps in Germany, Austria, Switzerland, Belgium, Latvia and Hungary today. The Corps is a member of the Weinheimer Senioren-Convent (WSC), the second oldest federation of classical Fraternities in Europe with roots dating back to the 15th century.

Four presidents ("Rektor") of Dresden University of Technology, Dresden's largest university with approximately 30.000 students, are among the list of members of the fraternity, underlining the deep connection between the Corps and the local alma mater. The connections with the university and the city of Dresden go far back to the fraternity's early beginnings in the late 19th century, with members aspiring to drive developments for the university over the course of history. Two major accomplishments were (1) ensuring the university's recognition by developing the former Technical Institute into the Royal Saxon Technical College of Dresden in the late 1800s and (2) founding of today's Studentenwerk Dresden in the early 1900s as the university's student council. Outside of the university's circles, many of the fraternity's members drove developments in the architectural style and design of several of Dresden's buildings such as the "Dresden's Neuer Bahnhof".

Membership in the fraternity is open to honorable men studying at one of Dresden's universities and is based exclusively on personality, good moral standing, and strength of character. Members of the Corps Altsachsen value and engage in the tradition of academic fencing as a way to sharpen and prove their character under pressure. Continuing a practice dating back into the 1700s, Altsachsen's members wear the traditional couleur, colored stripes, in grey-green-gold. The fraternity teaches and expects tolerance from its members, who are stemming from very diverse ethnic, national, religious and political backgrounds.

== Fundamentals and principles ==
Like all German Student Corps, Altsachsen expects tolerance from its members in political, scientific and religious affairs. Members are encouraged to have their own point of view about the world and be able to argue it, but Altsachsen as an entity always remains neutral. This neutrality is a fundamental pillar of all Corps and differentiates them from fraternities who require a certain political or religious affinity. The fraternity encourages freshly admitted (pledging "fox") members with diverse ethnic, national, religious and political backgrounds to prove themselves as valuable Corps brothers, purely on the basis of personal character and merit, before becoming eligible to be fully incorporated (Rezeption). The fraternity has about 200 members of all ages (including alumni) coming from or currently residing in Europe, Asia, the Americas and Africa. Every full member is a member for life.

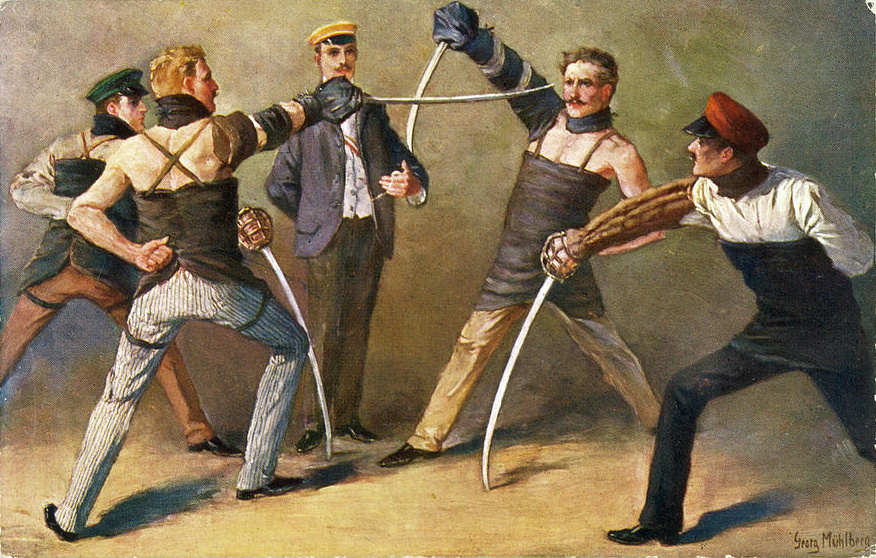
Academic "Mensur" fencing in 1900. Steel goggles were added to protect the eyes and nose nowadays.

Members of the Corps Altsachsen value and practice the tradition of engagements in academic fencing, or "Mensur" in German, with members of other old-school fraternities. Academic fencing, originating in the German school of fencing, is understood as a way to exercise good judgement and prove character, allowing participants to show determination by standing their ground under pressure, while enhancing the bonds between the Corps brothers at the same time. Mark Twain described one of these fencing duels/challenges in his day and age; his description is remarkably similar to current practices. Altsachsen's members identify themselves wearing the traditional couleur, colored stripes, as well as caps and/or other specific garments at official occasions. This tradition, known as "wearing colors" (German: Farben tragen), provides means to recognize members of other fraternities and, likewise, identification for the Corps brothers with each other and their traditions.

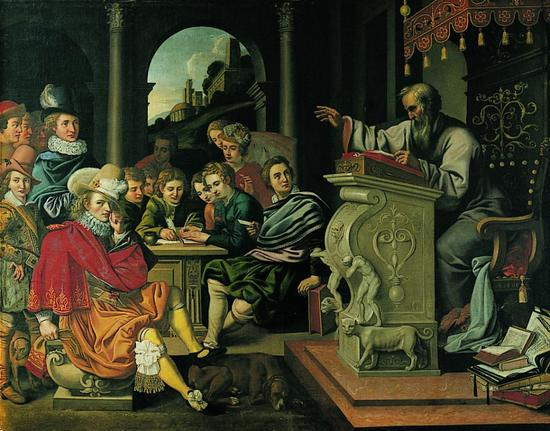
Rhetoric evenings in the fraternity's old-school bar are similar in style to a knight academy lecture as depicted.

Altsachsen's members value the art of rhetoric. The tradition is kept alive by both impromptu or "stand-up and talk" speeches (Stegreifrede in German) as well as elaborate platform presentations typical of industry and academia. All members must present a significant number of such talks and are graded on their presentation skills. In order to become a full member, pledge members must pass a curriculum of predetermined talks in front of their peers and guests.

Activity and responsibility are two fundamental expectations for fraternity members. With the goal to achieve members who are prepared to become active leaders in society, every Corps brother is expected to hold a leadership position at least once for a term ("Semester") while a student. Members are further encouraged to organize internal and open fraternity events that draw attention from other fraternities and guests from industry, academia, politics and other active societies. Allocating the necessary resources appropriately and living up to set expectations teaches responsibility. All members must show active participation in the regular fraternity Convents, providing the foundation for the fraternity's members to meet and discuss past, present and future developments. Decisions are cast in a democratic manner, sometimes after intense debates. Participation at such Convents teaches a better understanding of proper argumentation, group dynamics and critical analysis of other members' views, plans and arguments, thereby preparing its participants to become active members of society. Similarly, every member must finish his higher educational degree with good academic standing in order to advance to the status of Alter Herr (alumnus).

Long-term guidance is expected from and provided by said Alte Herren, who often remain very engaged and well connected with the fraternity. Every year at the end of May, student and alumni members of all German Student Corps meet in one of two cities (Weinheim and Bad Kösen) for three days to refresh their bonds with their fraternity and friends from the entire Corps network (WSC/KSCV). In addition to these international meetings once a year, alumni join the student members for multiple local meetings, lasting an evening or a weekend. These regular meetings result in strong bonds spanning the generations within the fraternity.

The object and purpose of the Corps was and still is solely the education of students to become a strong, free and cosmopolitan personality who is not held back by religious, racist, national, scientific or philosophical limitations of the mind. Three primary institutions within the fraternity aid with achieving this aim; including the Corpsconvent [regular council meetings of the Corps Brothers], the Kneipe [celebratory get-together of Corps Brothers with speeches, beer and songs], and today's Bestimmungsmensur [the event of academic fencing with sharp blades for the first or one of the first times], where the ones to fence are chosen on the basis of placing two equal opponents in front of each other. [...] This experience, and the intertwined need to overcome one's own fear, dedicated to the union of his Corps, and the connected strengthening of the sense of community aids the personal growth just as does taking a hit without losing one's stand and accepting the assessment of the Mensur by the own Corps Brothers.

— de:Hermann Rink

== History ==
=== Foundation as Rhetoric Society in 19th century Dresden ===
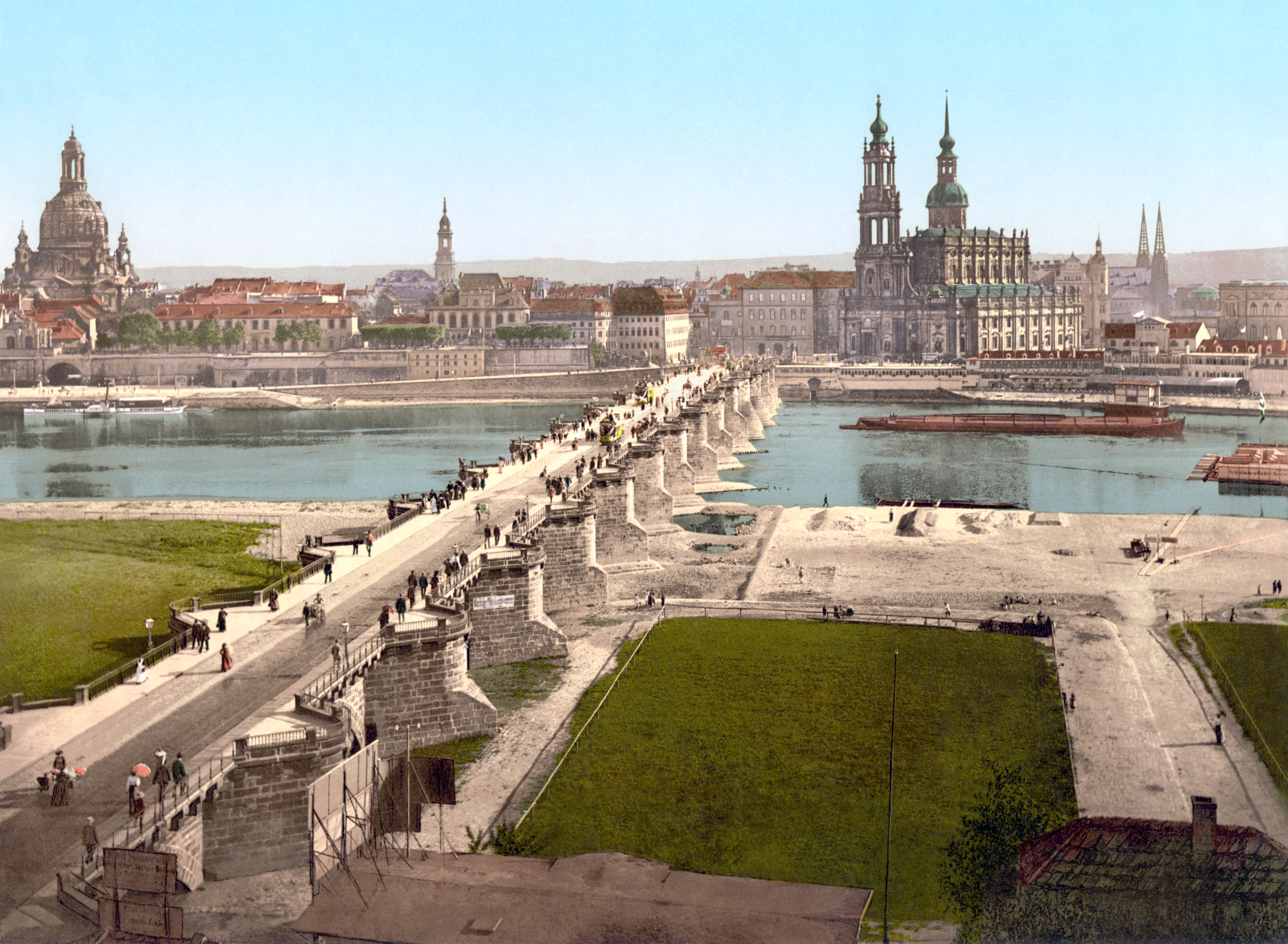
Brühl's Terrace in 1890.

The fraternity was founded on October 31, 1861, at the Brühl's Terrace in Dresden's city center as the Rhetoric Society by students of Dresden's former Institute of Technology, now the Dresden University of Technology. The name chosen for the new fraternity was originally Polyhymnia, after the muse of sacred poetry, rhetoric and eloquence. The founders strongly believed that a rhetoric education and discourse should be part of a complete humanistic higher education. The colors grey-green-gold were chosen to represent the fraternity's principles focusing on academia (grey), being full of fresh energy and hope for its principles (green), and valuing friendship among fraternity brothers (gold). The strong connection to the fraternity's founding location is often revived with a rhetoric get-together at Brühl's Terrace and spontaneous afternoon pub gatherings near the river Elbe as well as lavish balls throughout the year.

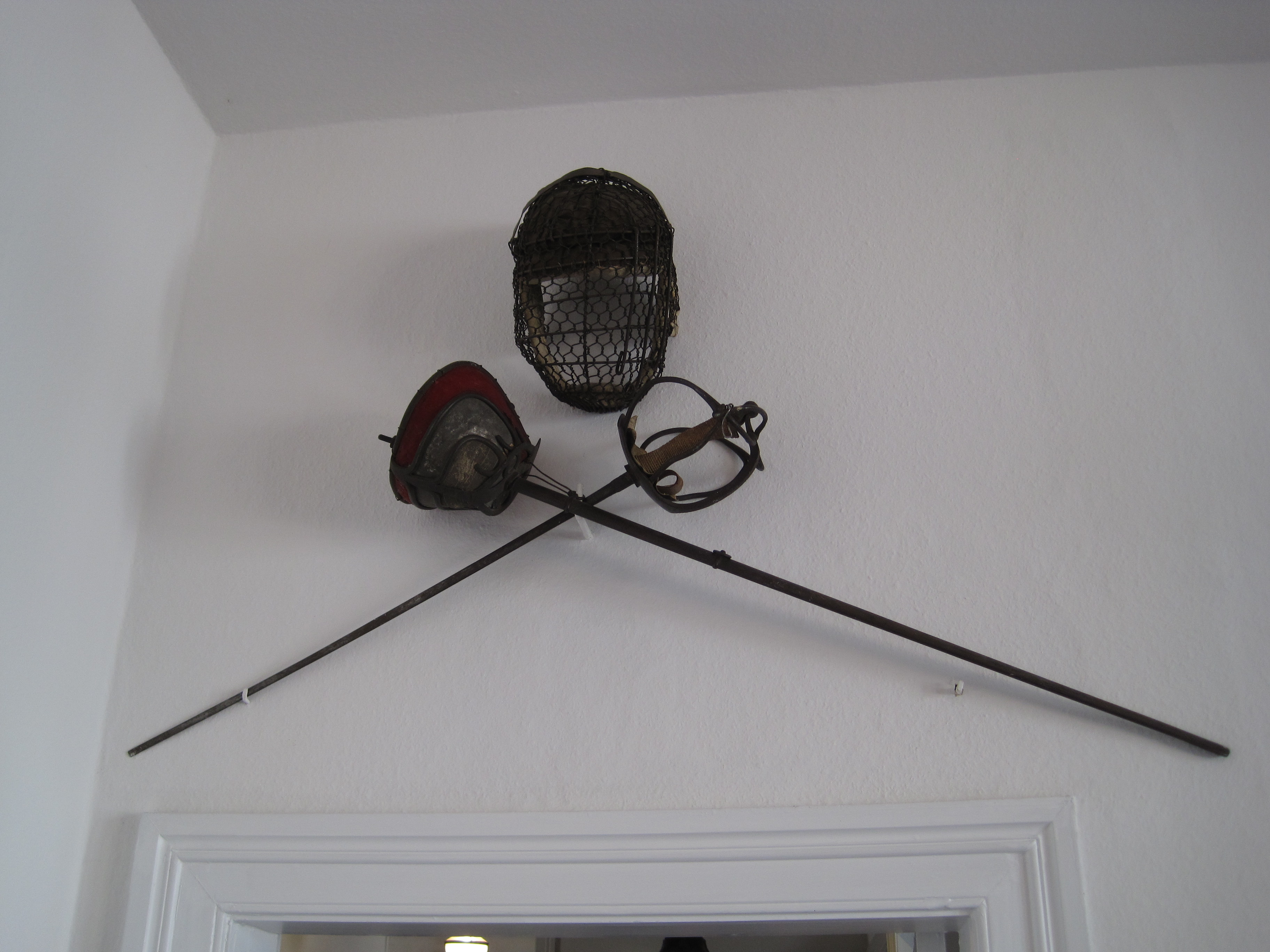
Bismarck's student sword and helmet, comparable to those used by Altsachsen's members then and now.

By 1868, the fraternity had adopted the tradition of academic fencing or "Mensur" challenges (back then "duels") with members of other proper fraternities and had changed its official name to Akademische Verbindung Polyhymnia (Academic Fraternity Polyhymnia). The motto "Litteris et amicitiae" (Science and Friendship) was adopted on June 25, 1880. The fraternity's coat of arms was chosen in the same year, depicting the one-headed black eagle of the time of the German Empire (1871–1918) instead of the two-headed eagle at the time of the fraternity's foundation.

=== Influencing the development of the Technical Institute of Dresden ===
Dresden's main university, today's Technical University (short: TU) Dresden was founded in 1828 as one of the first technical institutes of the world, then called "Technical School of Saxony". After Saxony joined the newly formed German Empire in 1871, the institute was renamed the Royal Saxon Polytechnic Institute (Königlich-Sächsisches Polytechnikum). At this point in time, topics not connected with technology, such as history and languages, were introduced to the school curriculum. Several of Altsachsen's fraternity members were in high-ranking institute and government positions and had an influential role by lobbying Saxony's state government to recognize the technical institute as a higher education provider with polytechnical merits, which resulted in yet another name change to Königlich-Sächsischen Technischen Hochschule Dresden (Royal-Saxon Technical College of Dresden) in 1890. To honor the recognition of the educational institution, the fraternity established the academic principle (akademische Prinzip). This meant that every member could only become an alumnus after graduating with a higher academic degree and in good academic standing, an initiative by fraternity member and Honorary Senator Fritz Zeuner, son of the former president of the Poly-technical Institute Gustav Zeuner. They and others in the fraternity significantly influenced the college's course, eventually leading to the college's privilege to graduate students with doctoral degrees in 1900. Aside from traditional doctoral graduations, the university was also allowed to honor exceptional scientists and businessmen as honorary doctors; the first such honor was granted to Friedrich August Siemens.

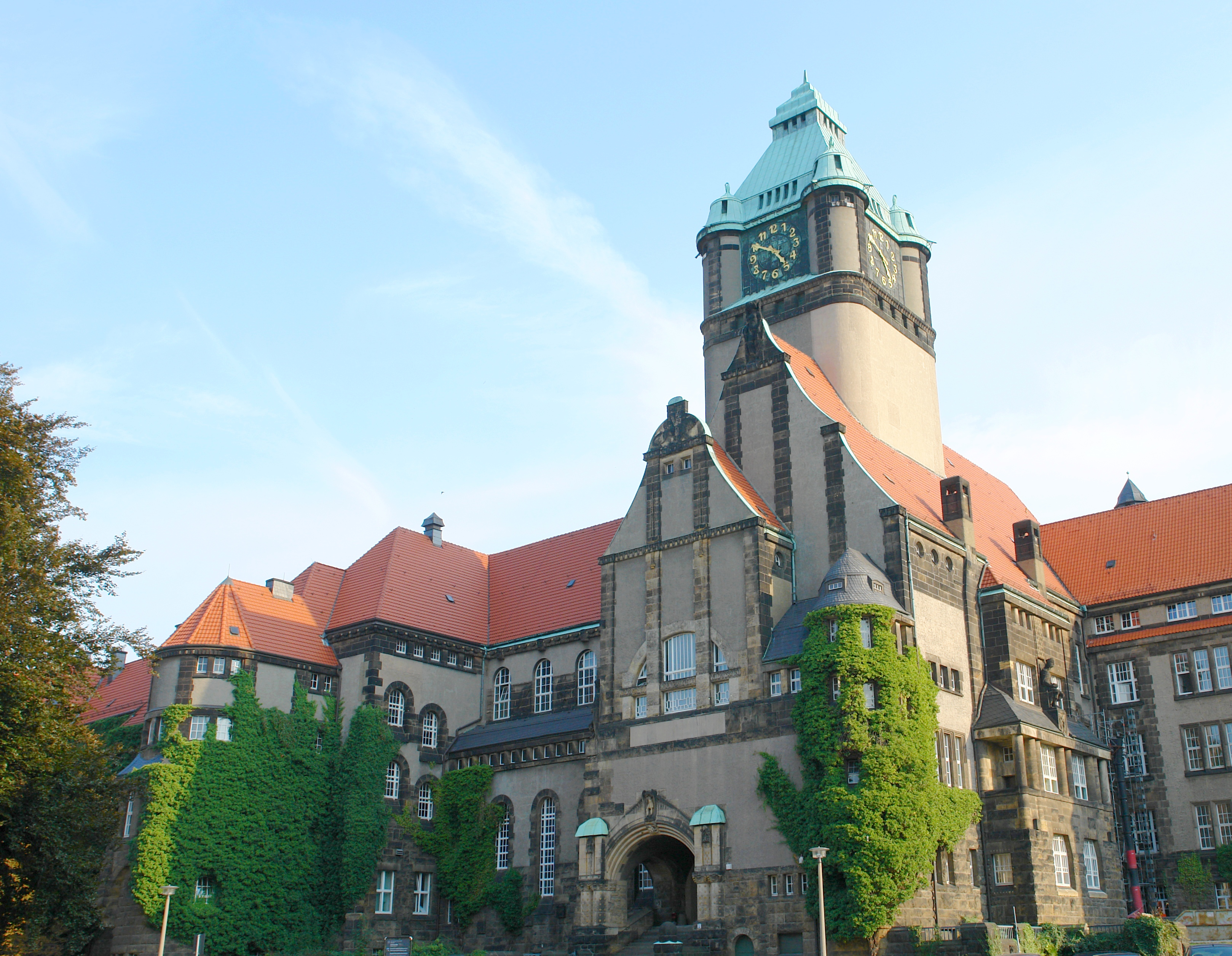
The typical, early 1900s style of campus architecture is exemplified in today's nearby Schumann-Building at the TU Dresden.

=== Foundation of Franconia ===
During the late 1800s, fraternities began forming fraternity circles and umbrella organizations. Differences in opinion about tolerance and general politics led to the end of honorable greeting and fencing with certain types of fraternities, such as the Cheruscia Dresden in 1899. This led to problems trying to maintain a high level of fencing engagements among similar fraternities, which is why five of Polyhymnia's fraternity brothers founded the "fencing fraternity Franconia Dresden" ("Freischlagende Verbindung Franconia", later "Corps Franconia Dresden") in Juli of 1899. Monetary stimulus for the new fraternity was provided by Polyhymnia's alumni-organisation. Both "fencing fraternities", not yet Corps at that point, formed the Dresden Fraternity Cartel ("Dresdner Verbindungs-Cartell" D.V.C.) to rival and engage in regular social and fencing events.

=== Joining the Weinheimer Senioren-Convent ===
To guarantee her members reliable means to fence with other fraternities of like principles, Polyhymnia joined the Weinheimer Senioren-Convent (WSC) in 1927 and was renamed Corps Altsachsen. The name change from Polyhymnia to Corps Altsachsen happened in compliance with WSC rules for fraternity names at that time. Likewise, most of the local fraternities merged to form similar umbrella organizations in the following years. From that point on, most of the social activity, such as eloquent balls as well as fencing engagements became limited to like-minded fraternities, the German Student Corps.

=== Suspension during times of the national socialist rule ===
Similar to other fraternities who encouraged their members to have their own free thought and will, members of the Corps Altsachsen felt the increasing pressure of national socialist surveillance as well as political pressure in the early 1930s. A similar-minded fraternity, Corps Makaria Dresden, fused with the Corps Altsachsen in 1934, which strengthened bonds and numbers within the fraternity. Still, as political pressures in Nazi Germany had increased to dangerous levels for fraternities during the next years, Corps Altsachsen officially suspended activities in 1936. During the 1930s, eventually all corps abiding by a free democratic order did the same as their view of the world was in stark contrast to the so-called Führerprinzip (Führer-principle), where one person governs essentially as dictator instead of relying on a democratic, consensus-based majority in a convent.

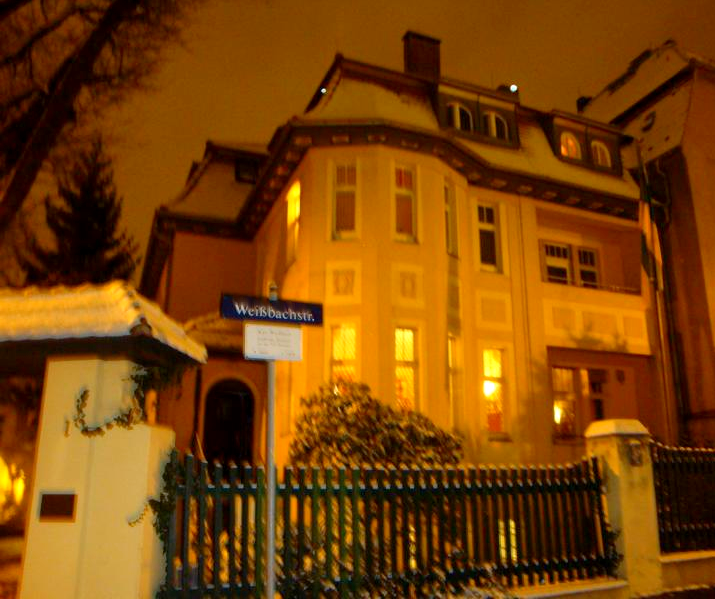
House of the fraternity in a snowy Christmas winter night in Dresden.

=== Post-war reconstitution and return to Dresden ===
After the war, the fraternity was reconstituted at the University of Cologne in 1950 and soon fused with the smaller Corps Gothia Dresden in 1953. Originally located in Köln-Lindenthal, Altsachsen soon moved to Köln-Marienburg, where it stayed until the Iron Curtain collapsed. During the Soviet dictatorship in East Germany, fraternities abiding by free will and common consensus were again not allowed to exist as they could not be controlled by the Socialist Party. Following Germany's reunification in 1989, the fraternity returned to Dresden in 1994 with the aid of the Blaues Kartell, a circle of four like-minded fraternities that Altsachsen had joined in 1993. The Blaues Kartell today includes the Corps Saxo-Thuringia München in Munich, Corps Hannoverania in Hanover and Corps Berlin in Berlin. In 1997, the Corps Altsachsen transitioned its headquarters to its newly remodeled fraternity house on Weissbachstreet 1, right in the middle of the Campus of the Dresden University of Technology, thereby reconnecting with its traditional roots.

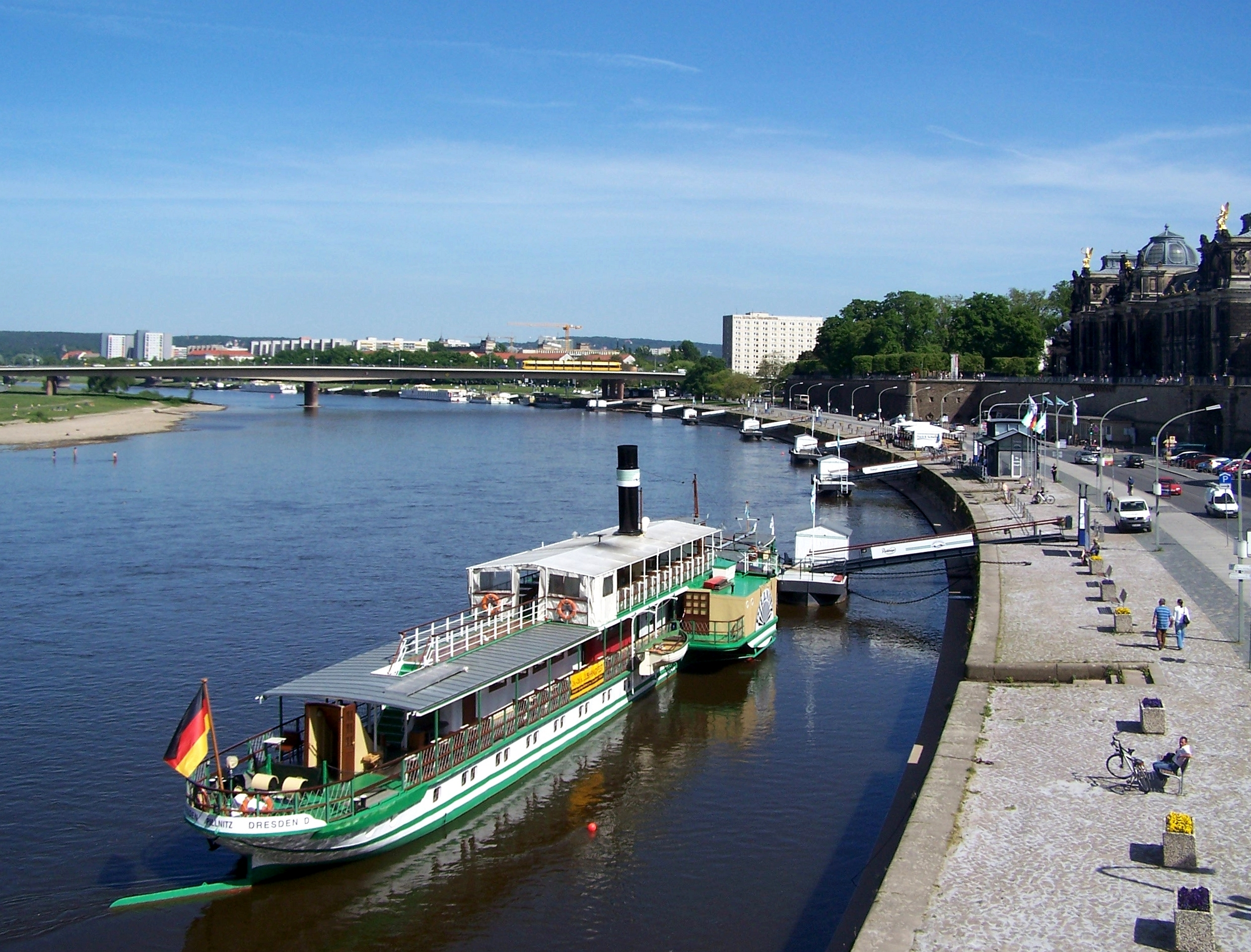
Steamboat at Brühl's Terrace

=== Today ===
The fraternity is known for its strong commitment to the university and its rhetoric traditions as well as lavish social events. Among these are regular boat parties on Dresden's steam boats as well as traditional balls allowing the Corps brothers to enjoy waltz, Latin or many other forms of ballroom dance. Many of these events are not limited to the region of Dresden, as there are several trips per year to other cities.

== Symbols ==
The fraternity's motto is Litteris et amicitiae!. Its colors are white, green, and gold. Its publication is Altsachsen-Mitteilungen.

== Relationships with other fraternities ==
Corps Altsachsen is a member of the Blaues Kartell, a circle of four German Student Corps that understand the union as "one fraternity spanning four cities" (Dresden, Munich, Hanover, and Berlin).
In chronological order. Links to the German Wikipedia are in process of being translated and currently indicated with "ge".

- Corps Saxo-Thuringia München in Munich
- Corps Hannoverania Hannover "ge".
- Corps Berlin

== Notable members ==
In alphabetic order with links to the English Wikipedia on top. Links to the German Wikipedia are in process of being translated and currently indicated with "ge".

- Hans Görges ge(1859–1946), President (Rektor) of the Technischen Hochschule Dresden 1914–1915, the predecessor of today's TU Dresden, as well as an influential physicist and professor for electrical engineering.
- Walther Heise, highest-level government construction officer and construction manager for the Erich Müller-Building, the Jante Building and the Zeuner Building at the TU Dresden.
- Heinrich Koch (1873–1945), highest-level government construction officer and construction manager for the Beyer-Building at the TU Dresden as well as the main building of Saxony's capital city archive in Dresden.
- Martin Johann Krause, President (Rektor) of the Technischen Hochschule Dresden 1894–1896 and 1919–1920, the predecessor of today's TU Dresden.
- Siegfried Meurer ge (1908–1997), engineer and inventor of the "Flüstermotor" (quiet diesel engine) as well as honorary professor at the Technical University RWTH Aachen.
- Hermann Immanuel Rietschel ge (1847–1914), founder of the heating- and climate technology specialization in mechanical engineering in Germany.
- Oskar August Reuther, President (Rektor) of the TH Dresden 1932–1934, the predecessor of today's TU Dresden.
- Hermann Rietschel, President (Rektor) of the Technischen Hochschule Berlin 1893–1894, the predecessor of today's TU Berlin.
- Malwin Roßberg, High-level government construction officer and construction manager for the Fritz Förster Building and the Walter-König Building at the TU Dresden.

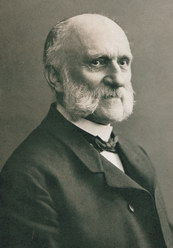
Wagner is credited as the main founder of the fraternity in 1861.

- Freiherr Carl von Wagner ge (1843–1907), Main civil engineer overseeing the planning, design and construction of the Isthmus of Tehuantepec railroad pass in Central America.
- Fritz Zeuner, Honorary senator at the TH Dresden
- Carl Zimmerer ge (1926–2001), International business consultant, honorary doctorate at the WHU - Otto Beisheim School of Management and member of the board of directors at the Agrippina Rückversicherungs AG.

== Recipients of the Klinggraeff-Medal (Klinggräff-Medaille) ==
The Klinggräff-Medal is awarded for the combination of extraordinary accomplishments in academia, involvement for the fraternity and proven leadership on local and, preferentially, national level. An average of five medals is awarded each year nation-wide, chosen by a joint alumni committee of KSCV and WSC representatives. The award indirectly reflects back at the fraternity, showing leaders in their field among the fraternity's brothers. For more information see Klinggräff-Medaille ge at the Association of German Student Corps Alumni ge.

Recipients of the Klinggraeff-Medal for the Corps Altsachsen are:

- Dirk Steinebach (1993)
- Manfred Franke (2009)
- Anton Anthofer (2015)

== See also ==
- Integrity
- Prussian virtues
- The Enlightenment
- List of members of German student corps

== Gallery ==
A small list of buildings in Dresden that were designed or constructed by members of the fraternity.

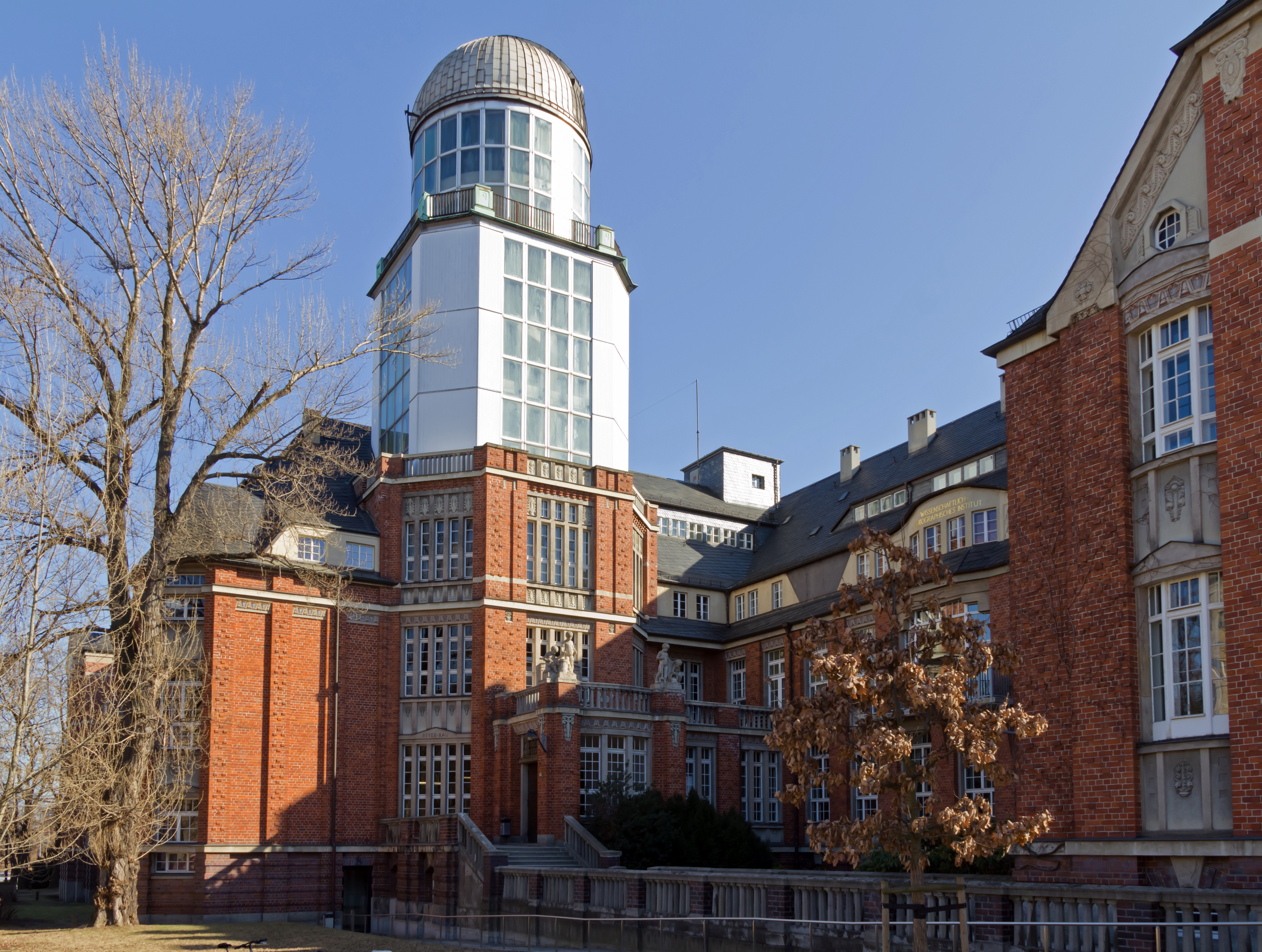
Beyer-Building at the TU Dresden.

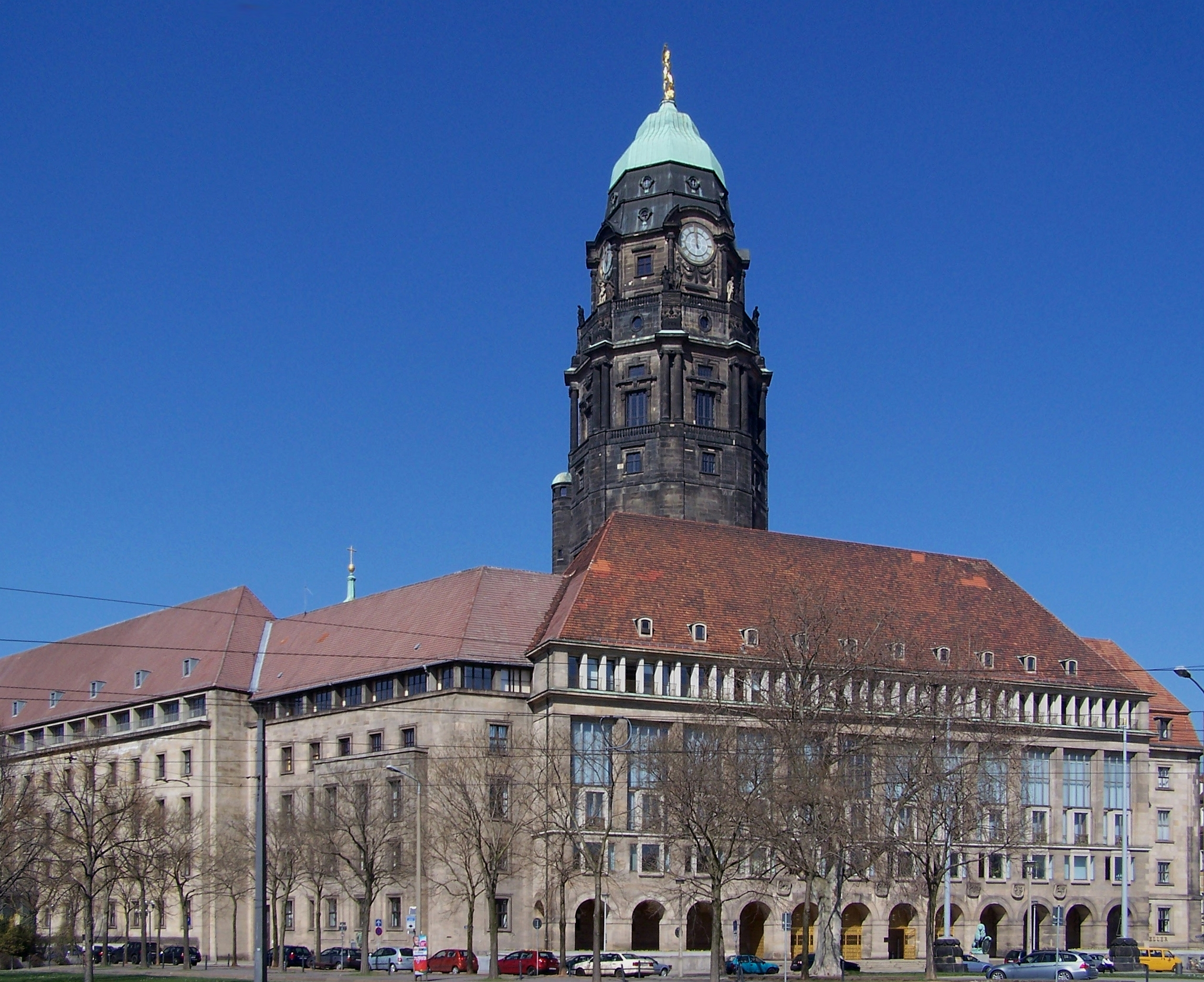
The Neues Dresdner Rathaus (New City Hall), seen from the Georgplatz.

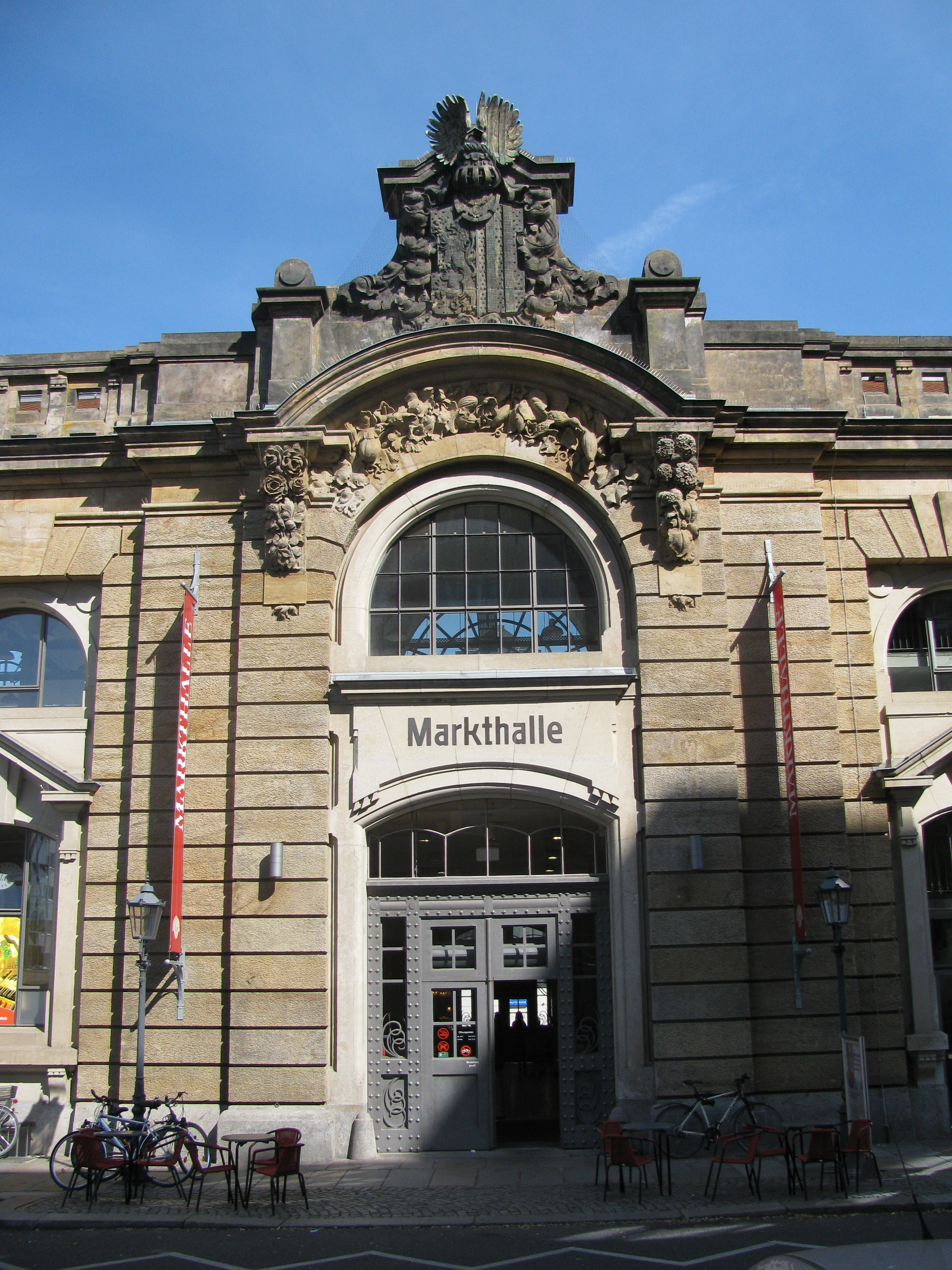
Dresden's Neustädter Markthalle (New Market Hall), portal seen from the Ritterstraße

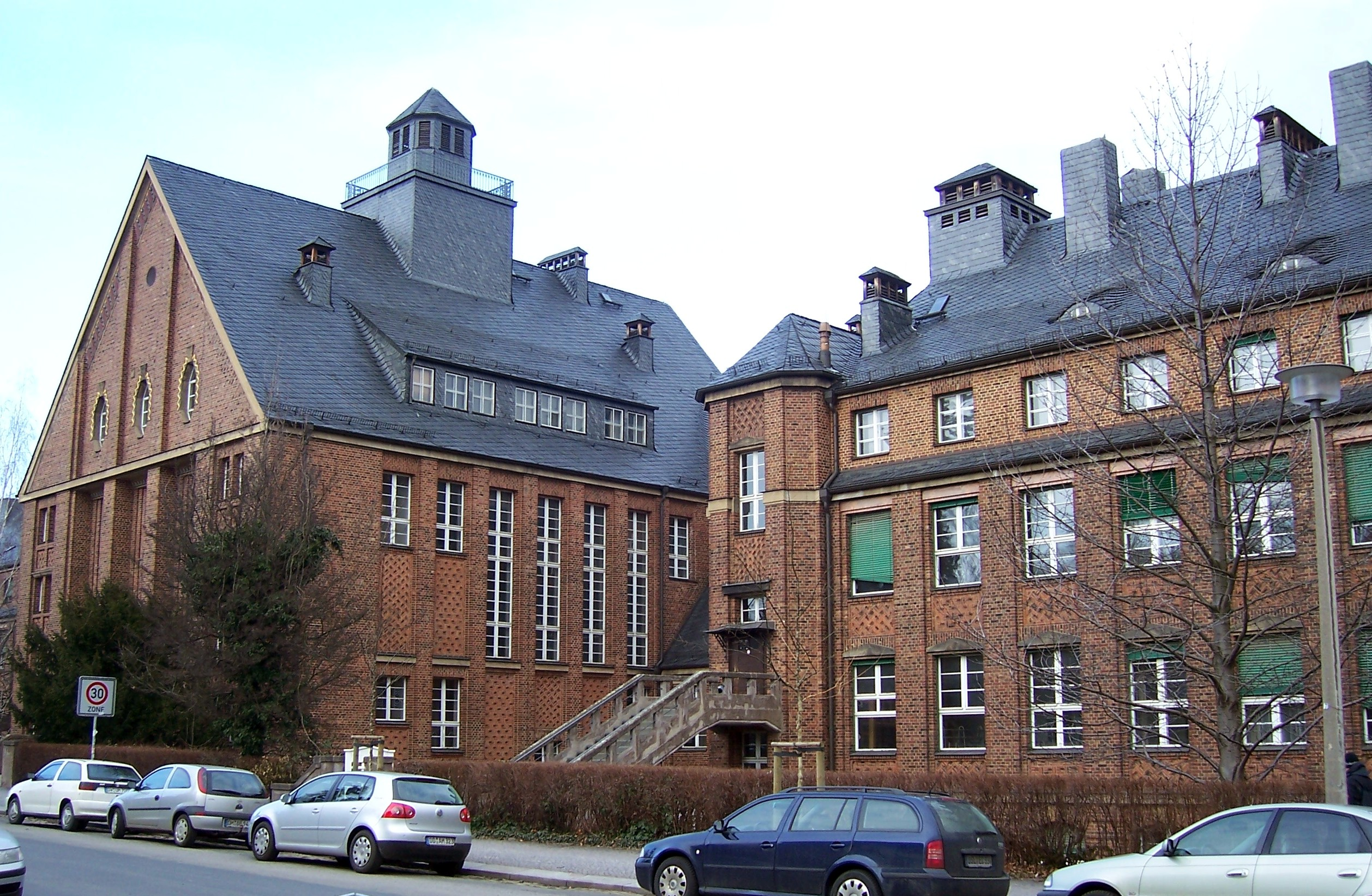
Fritz-Förster-Building seen from the TU Dresden's campus' main street "Mommsenstraße".

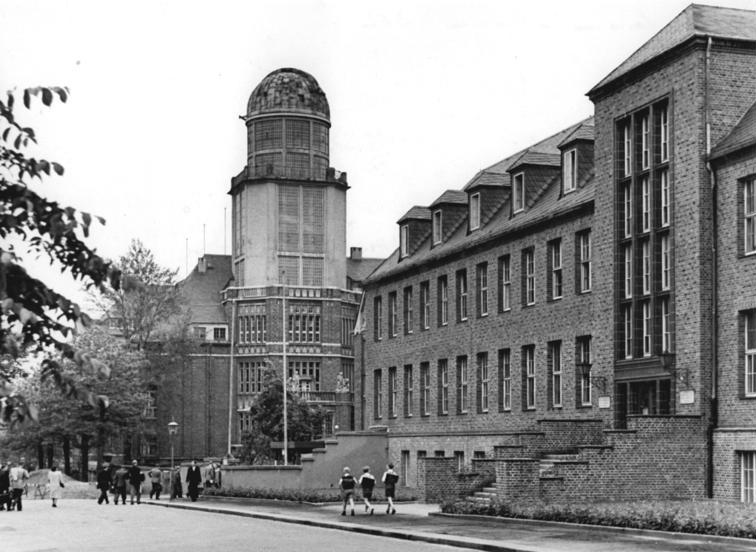
Jante-Building (right) with Beyer-Building (left) at the TU Dresden

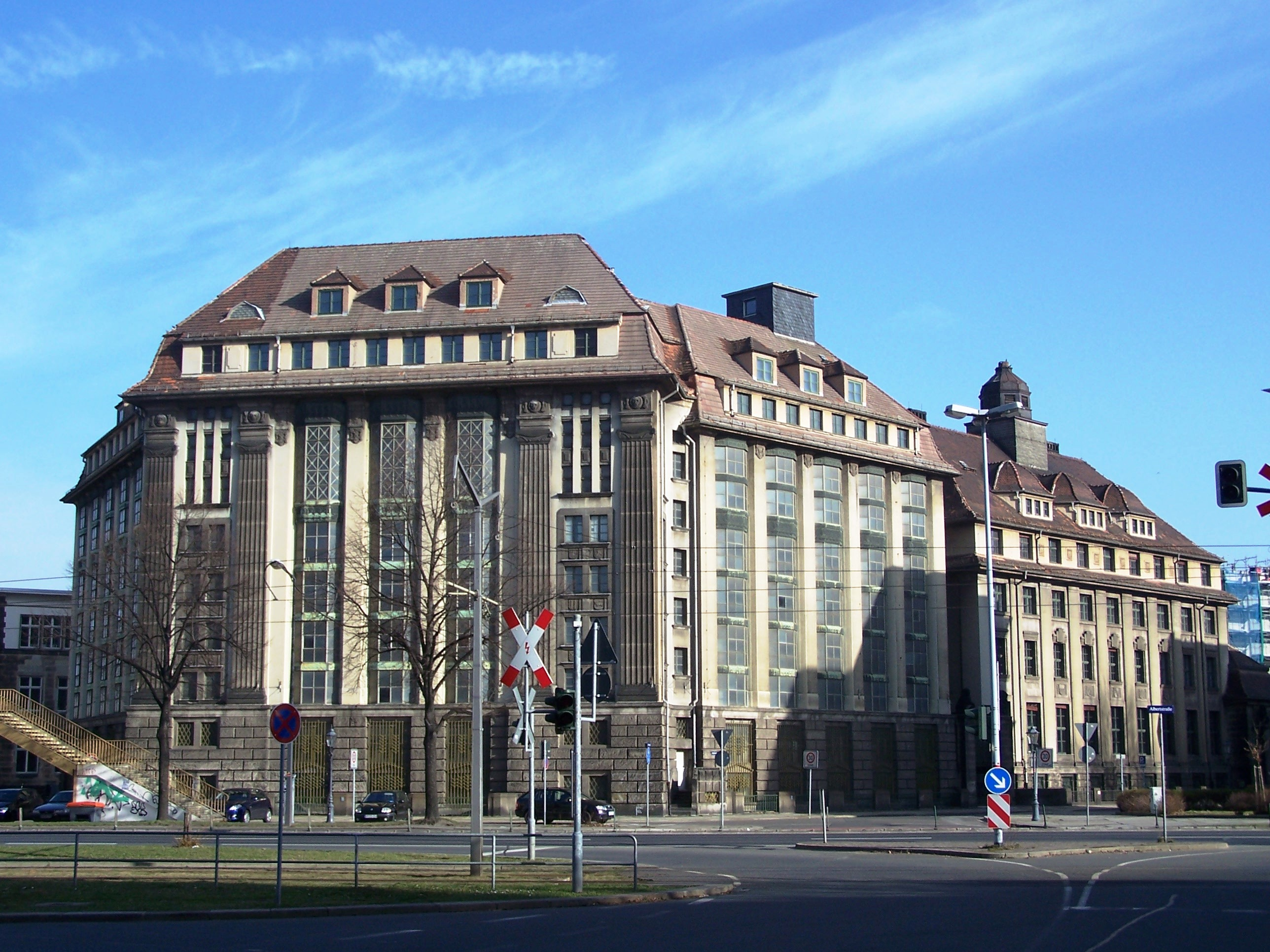
Central State Archive of Dresden containing documents of the Kingdom and Electorate of Saxony.

== Literature ==
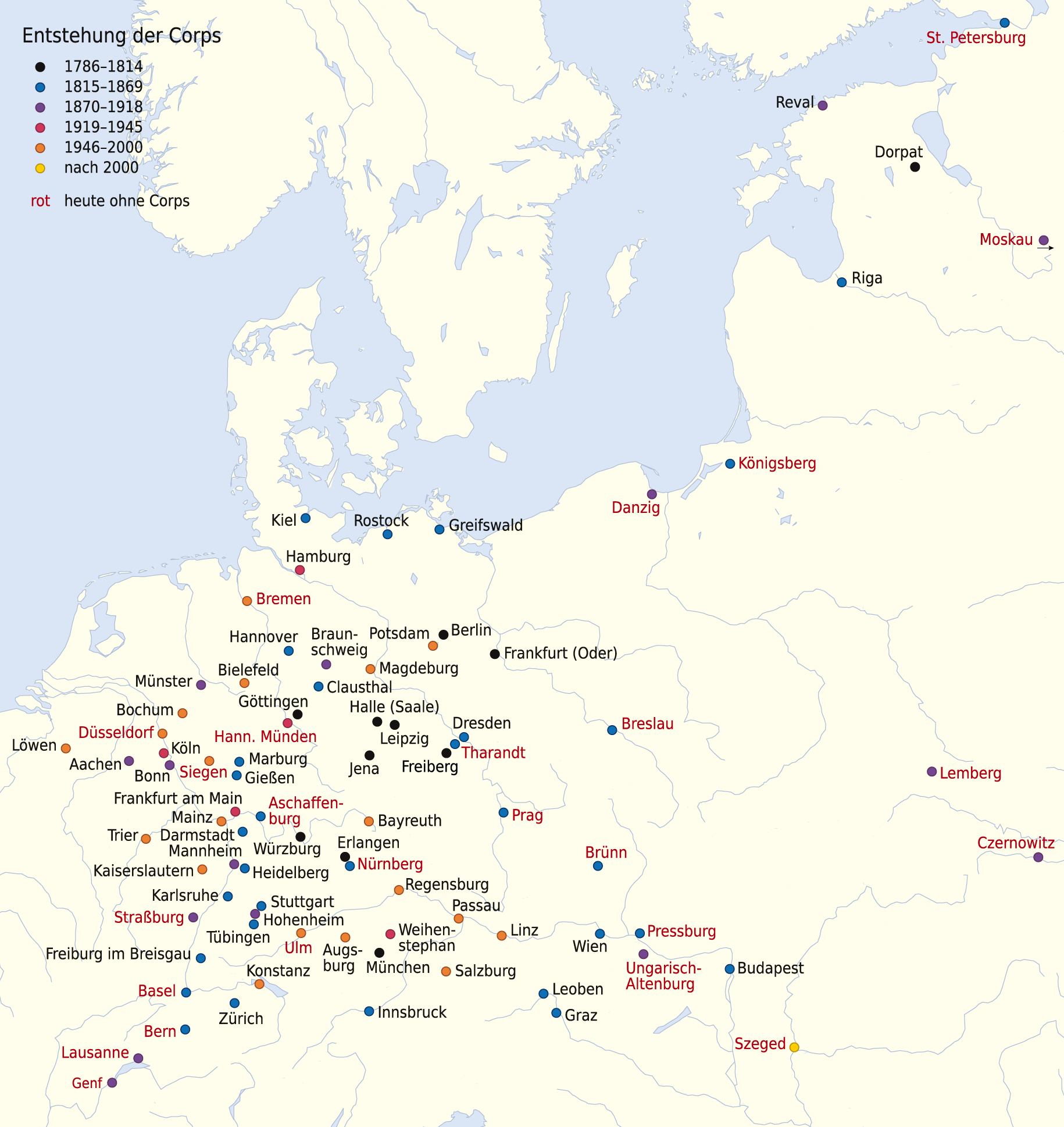
Map of the developing German Student Corps during 18/19th-century Europe.

- Lees Knowles: A day with corps-students in Germany
- Mark Twain describes his encounters with German corps students in chapters IV to VII of his travelogue A Tramp Abroad.
- Mark Twain describes specifically the fencing scene in A Tramp Abroad.
- Secondary web source of Mark Twain's descriptions of his encounters with German corps students in chapters IV to VII of his travelogue A Tramp Abroad.
- LaVaque-Manty, Mika (2006). "Dueling for Equality: Masculine Honor and the Modern Politics of Dignity" (PDF). Political Theory. 34 (6): 715–740. doi:10.1177/0090591706291727. S2CID 143261653.
- Gay, Peter (April 1992). "Mensur: The Cherished Scar". The Yale Review. 80 (1–2). ISBN 9780393033984.
- Paulgerhard Gladen: Die Kösener und Weinheimer Corps. Ihre Darstellung in Einzelchroniken. WJK-Verlag, Hilden 2007, ISBN 3-933892-24-4, S. 91–92.
- Hans Schüler: Weinheimer S.C.-Chronik, Darmstadt 1927, S. 434–454
- Michael Doeberl u. a. (Hrsg.): Das akademische Deutschland, Band 2: Die deutschen Hochschulen und ihre akademischen Bürger, Berlin 1931, S. 735
- Rolf-Joachim Baum: "Wir wollen Männer, wir wollen Taten!" – Deutsche Corpsstudenten 1848 bis heute. Berlin 1998, S. 7–12. ISBN 3-88680-653-7
- Corps Altsachsen (1961), Hundert Jahre Corps Altsachsen (in German) (1. ed.), Köln, p. 86
- Paulgerhard Gladen: Geschichte der studentischen Korporationsverbände, Band 1, S. 53, Würzburg 1981
- Paulgerhard Gladen (2007), Die Kösener und Weinheimer Corps: Ihre Darstellung in Einzelchroniken (in German) (1. ed.), Hilden: WJK-Verlag, p. 200, ISBN 978-3-933892-24-9
