= Blaues Kartell =

German student corps collaboration

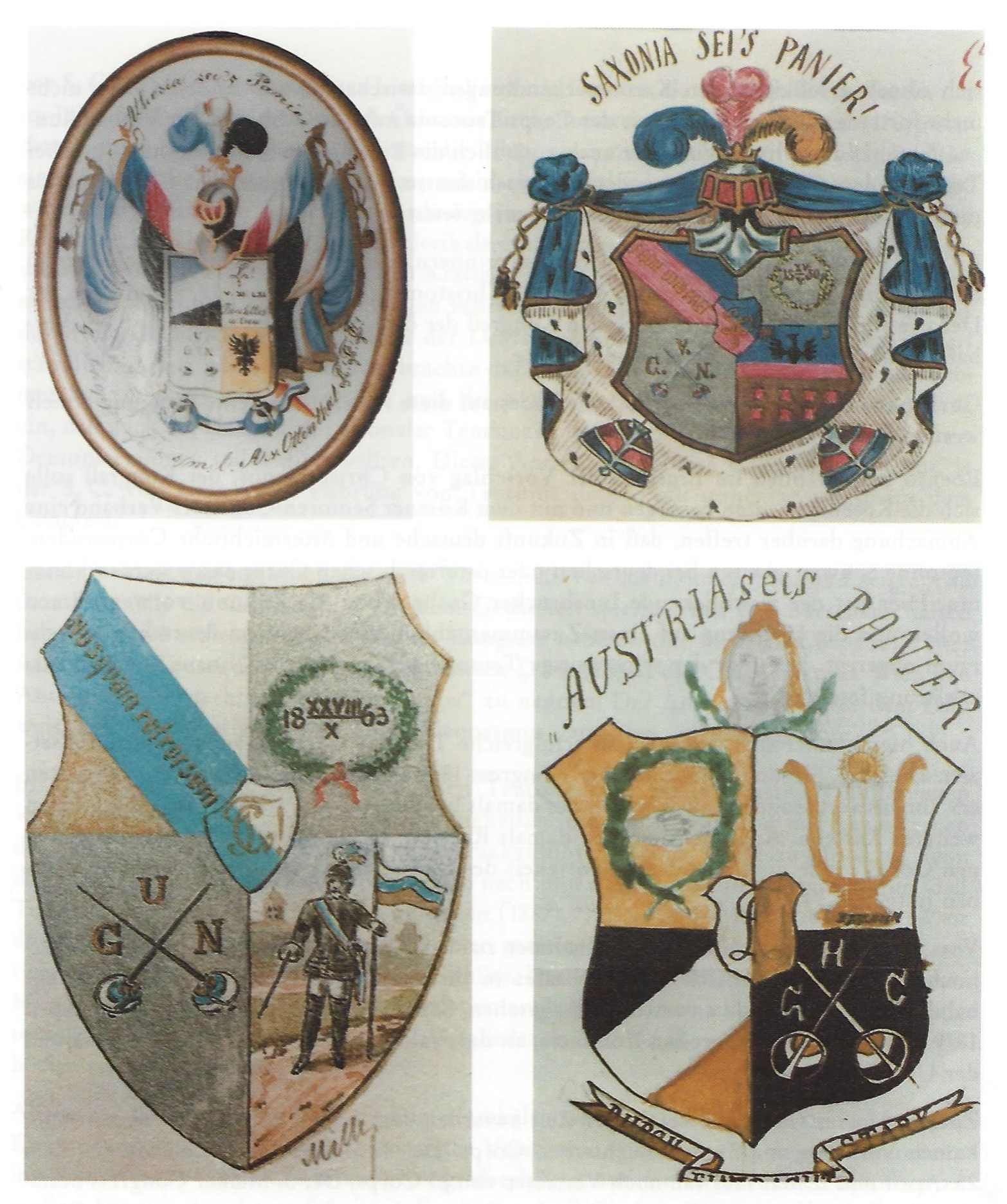
- Founded: April 24, 1874; 151 years ago
- Type: Studentenverbindung
- Affiliation: WSC
- Status: Active
- Scope: National
- Chapters: 4
- Headquarters: Germany

The Blaues Kartell (English: Blue Cartel) is a circle of four German Student Corps or Studentenverbindung that view the union as "one fraternity spanning four cities". The member fraternities are Corps Altsachsen Dresden, Corps Berlin, Corps Hannoverania, and Saxo-Thuringia München. The Blaues Kartell is the largest one of similar circles within the Weinheimer Senioren-Convent (WSC), the second oldest federation of classical fraternities found in Europe, its roots dating back to the 15th century A.D.

According to the declaration of all Kartellcorps, each shall understand the membership as being part in one fraternity with different university locations and different fraternity colors. (German original: Entsprechend der beim Abschluss des Kartells abgegebenen Erklärung verstehen sich die Kartellcorps im Sinne der ideellen Zusammengehörigkeit als ein Corps mit jeweils anderem Namen und anderen Farben an einem anderen Hochschulort. )

— Excerpt from the Constitution of the Blaues Kartell

== History ==
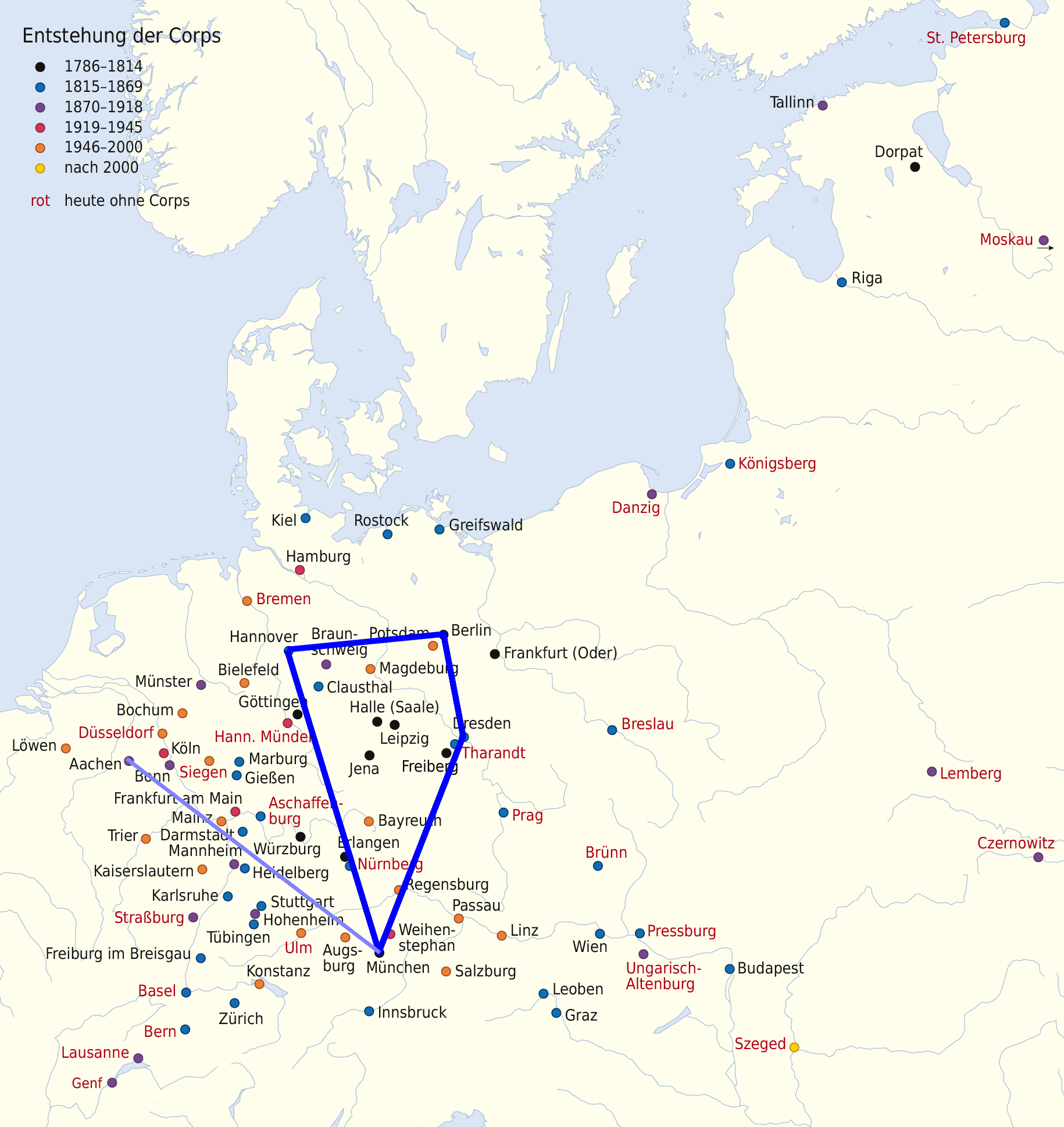
The Blaues Kartell connects Berlin, Dresden, Hanover and Munich on the map of the German Student Corps as they developed in 18/19th century Europe. A new connection is forming to Marko-Guestphalia in Aachen

The Blaues Kartell was founded on April 24, 1874, by Landsmannschaft Hannoverania Hannover and Landsmannschaft Feronia Berlin (later Corps Teutonia, today part of Corps Berlin). Both fraternities belonged to the local Berliner SC of veterinary-medical Landsmannschaften. The group changed its name to Blaues Kartell in 1885 when Corps Nicaria Stuttgart (merged with Saxo-Thuringia Munich in 1910).

Over the years, the Blaues Kartell grew as new fraternities with compatible ideals of the Enlightenment joined and left:

- 1874 Initiation by Hannoverania Hannover and Feronia Berlin (later Corps Teutonia, today Corps Berlin)
- 1875 Hippokratia München (until suspension in 1879)
- 1885 Landsmannschaft Nicaria Stuttgart (until it fused with Saxo-Thuringia München in 1910)
- 1899 Saxo-Thuringia München
- 1900 Albingia Aachen (until it fused with Marko-Guestphalia Aachen in 1996)
- 1933 Frisia Frankfurt (until it was suspended due to Nazi pressure in 1935)
- 20 November 1993 Altsachsen Dresden joined the Blue Cartel.
- 5 May 2010 Corps Berlin (established in 2009 by a fusion of Corps Teutonia, Cheruscia, and Rheno-Guestphalia in Berlin).

The constitution of the Blaues Kartell stipulates that when a member fraternity merges with another external fraternity, it will lose its membership with the Blaues Kartell. The reason is that newly-formed fraternities are understood to be inhomogeneous; they first must debate and decide to re-join the Blaues Kartell internally, then successfully petition to be accepted as an equal member of the Kartell again, a process which requires the current Kartell members to agree on the new potential member.

As a result of formerly being a member but not yet having re-joined the Kartell, a friendly relationship exists with Corps Marko-Guestphalia Aachen that has its origin in Marko-Guestphalia's history: the former Corps Albingia Dresden existed until its suspension due to Nazi pressure against the German Student Corps in the 1930s and remained dormant for years before being reconstructed in Aachen after the war. The fusion of the reconstructed, now Corps Albingia Aachen with the Corps Marko-Guestphali Aachen in 1996 caused Albingia to exit the Kartell. Afterward, Marko-Guestphalia and Saxo-Thuringia established an official relationship to commemorate the former band between the two fraternities.

Each member of the Kartell has its own headquarters and different colors.

== Symbols ==
The group was named Blaues Kartell or the Blue Cartel because of the colors of the caps worn by its original member organizations.

== Members ==
Following of the current members of Blues Kartell.

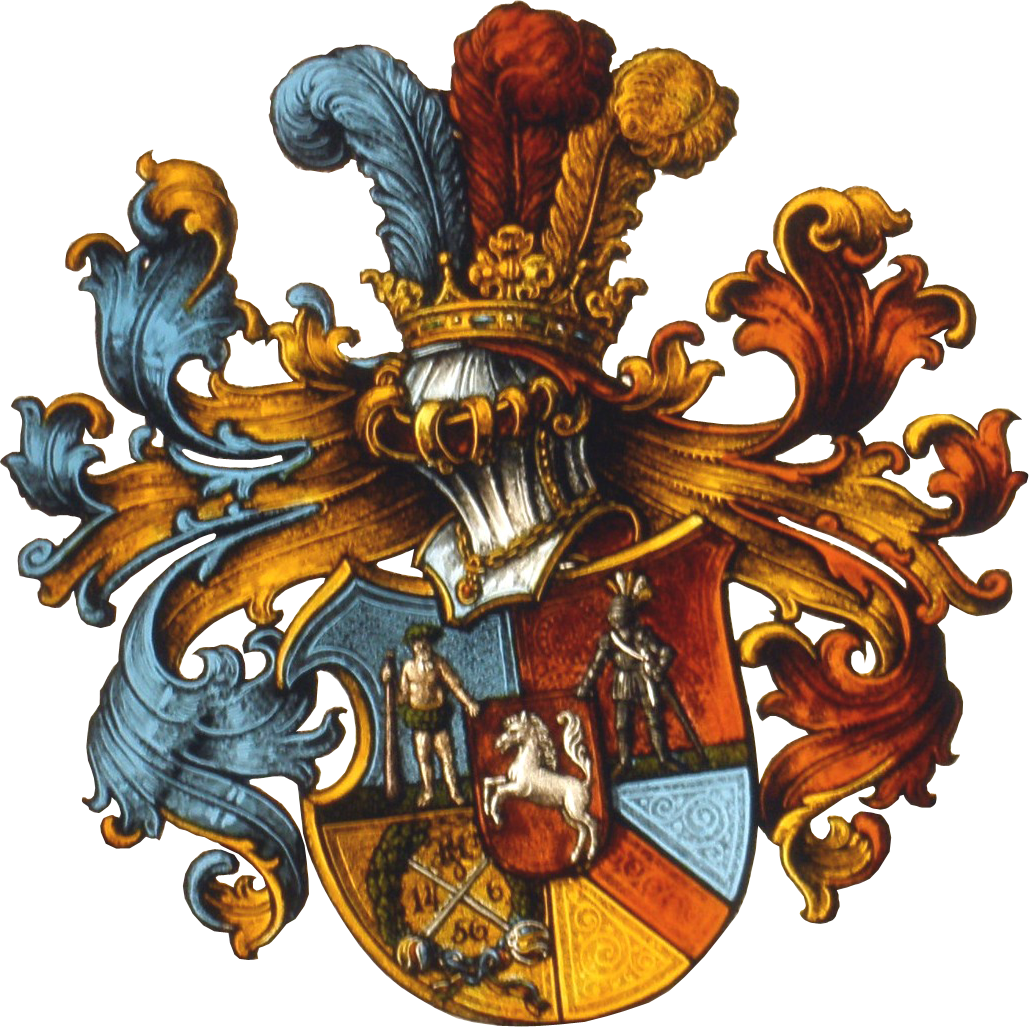
Corps Hannoverania in Hanover

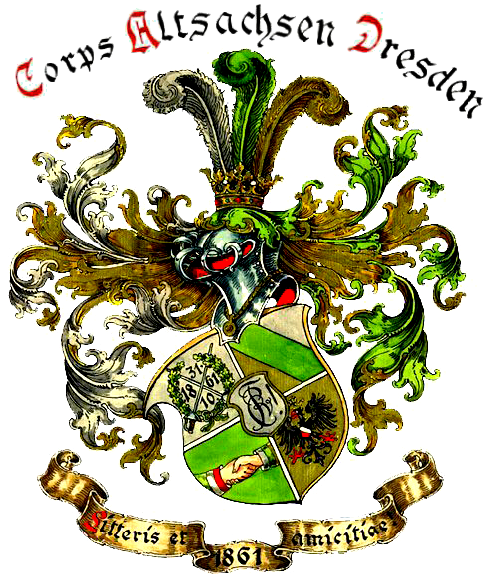
Corps Altsachsen in Dresden

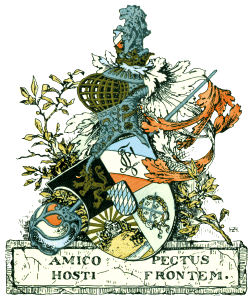
Corps Saxo-Thuringia in Munich

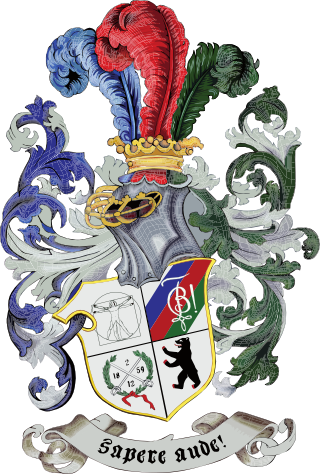
Corps Berlin in Berlin

== Literature ==
- Lees Knowles: A day with corps-students in Germany
