= Corps Berlin =

German student fraternal organization

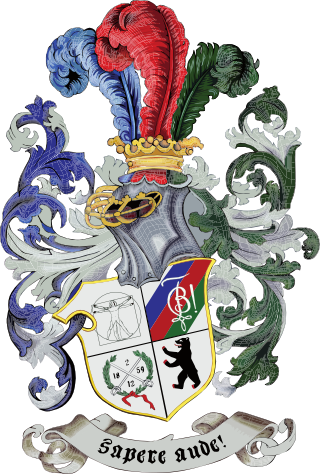
- Founded: December 2, 1859; 165 years ago Berlin, Germany
- Type: Studentenverbindung
- Affiliation: WSC
- Status: Active
- Scope: International
- Motto: Sapere aude
- Colors: Blue, Red and Green, surrounded by Silver
- Zirkel
- Chapters: 1
- Members: ~220 active
- Headquarters: Rüsternallee 34; Berlin 14050; Germany
- Website: www.corps-berlin.de

The Corps Berlin is a fraternity (Studentenverbindung) in Berlin, Germany, founded on February 9, 2009 with roots dating back to December 2, 1859. It is one of 162 German Student Corps in Germany, Austria, Switzerland, Belgium, Latvia and Hungary today. The Corps is a member of the Weinheimer Senioren-Convent (WSC), the second oldest federation of classical European fraternal corporations, with roots dating back to the 15th century and fraternities founded in several European countries.

Membership in the fraternity is open to honorable men studying at one of Berlin's universities and is based exclusively on personality, good moral standing, and strength of character. Members of the Corps Berlin value and engage in the tradition of academic fencing as a way to sharpen and prove their character under pressure. Continuing a practice dating back into the 1700s, Corps Berlin's members wear the traditional couleur, colored stripes, in blue-red-green. The fraternity teaches and expects tolerance from its members, stemming from diverse ethnic, national, religious and political backgrounds.

== History ==
The fraternity was founded by joining three Corps on February 9, 2009: Corps Cheruscia with its original founding date December 2, 1859; Corps Rheno-Guestphalia with its original founding date February 4, 1870; and Corps Teutonia with its original founding date July 1, 1870.

The fraternity has official relationships with the Corps Altsachsen Dresden, Corps Saxo-Thuringia München in Munich and Corps Hannoverania in Hanover, forming the Blaues Kartell of four fraternities throughout Germany that understand the cartel as one large fraternity in four different cities.

The fraternity has about 220 members of all ages (including alumni) coming from or currently residing in Europe, Asia, the Americas and Africa. Every full member is a member for life.It is located at Technische Universität, Freie Universität Berlin, and Humboldt-Universität

== Symbols ==
Corps Berlin's motto is Sapere aude. Members identify themselves wearing the traditional couleur, colored stripes, as well as caps and/or other specific garments at official occasions. This tradition, known as "wearing colors" (German: Farben tragen), provides means to recognize members of other fraternities and, likewise, identification for the Corps brothers with each other and their traditions. Its member couleurs are blue-red-green, surrounded by silver. Its pledge couleurs are red-green surrounded by silver.

== Fundamentals and principles ==
Like all German Student Corps, Corps Berlin expects tolerance from its members in political, scientific and religious affairs. Members are encouraged to have their own point of view about the world and be able to argue it, but Corps Berlin as an entity always remains neutral. This neutrality is a fundamental pillar of all Corps and differentiates them from fraternities who require a certain political or religious affinity. The fraternity encourages freshly admitted (pledging "fox") members with diverse ethnic, national, religious and political backgrounds to prove themselves as valuable Corps brothers, purely on the basis of personal character and merit, before becoming eligible to be fully incorporated (Rezeption).

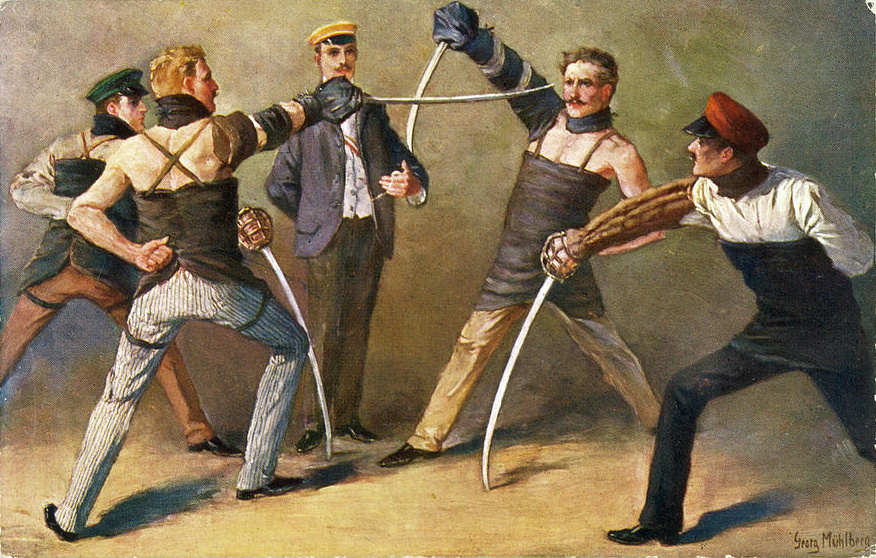
Academic "Mensur" fencing in 1900. Steel goggles provide added protection nowadays.

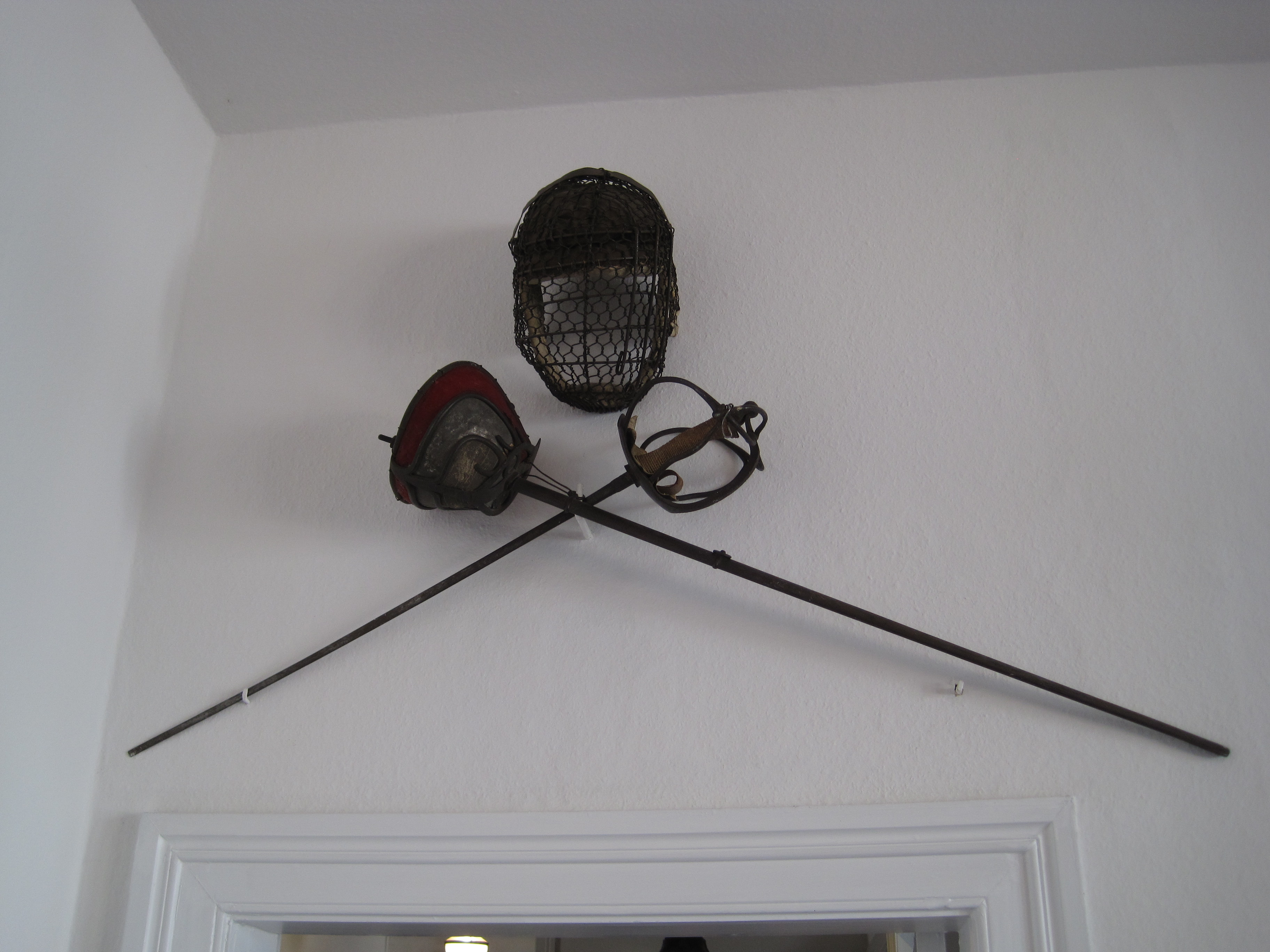
Bismarck's student sword and helmet, comparable to those used by the fraternity's members then and now.

Members of the Corps Berlin value and practice the tradition of engagements in academic fencing, or Mensur, with members of other old-school fraternities. Academic fencing, originating in the German school of fencing, is understood as a way to exercise good judgement and prove character, allowing participants to show determination by standing their ground under pressure, while enhancing the bonds between the Corps brothers at the same time.

Activity and responsibility are two fundamental expectations for fraternity members. With the goal to achieve members who are prepared to become active leaders in society, every Corps brother is expected to hold a leadership position at least once for a term or semester while a student. Members are further encouraged to organize internal and open fraternity events that draw attention from other fraternities and guests from industry, academia, politics and other active societies. Allocating the necessary resources appropriately and living up to set expectations teaches responsibility.

All members must show active participation in the regular fraternity Convents, providing the foundation for the fraternity's members to meet and discuss past, present and future developments. Decisions are cast in a democratic manner, sometimes after intense debates. Participation at such Convents teaches a better understanding of proper argumentation, group dynamics and critical analysis of other members' views, plans and arguments, thereby preparing its participants to become active members of society. Similarly, every member must finish his higher educational degree with good academic standing in order to advance to the status of Alter Herr or alumnus.

Long-term guidance is expected from and provided by said Alte Herren, who often remain very engaged and well connected with the fraternity. Every year at the end of May, student and alumni members of all German Student Corps meet in either (Weinheim or Bad Kösen for three days to refresh their bonds with their fraternity and friends from the entire Corps network (WSC/KSCV). In addition to these international meetings once a year, alumni join the student members for multiple local meetings, lasting an evening or a weekend. These regular meetings result in strong bonds spanning the generations within the fraternity.

== Relationships with other fraternities ==
Corps Berlin is a member of the Blaues Kartell, a circle of four German Student Corps that understand the union as "one fraternity spanning four cities" (Berlin, Dresden, Hanover, and Munich).

- Corps Saxo-Thuringia München in Munich
- Corps Hannoverania Hannover
- Corps Altsachsen Dresden

== Literature ==
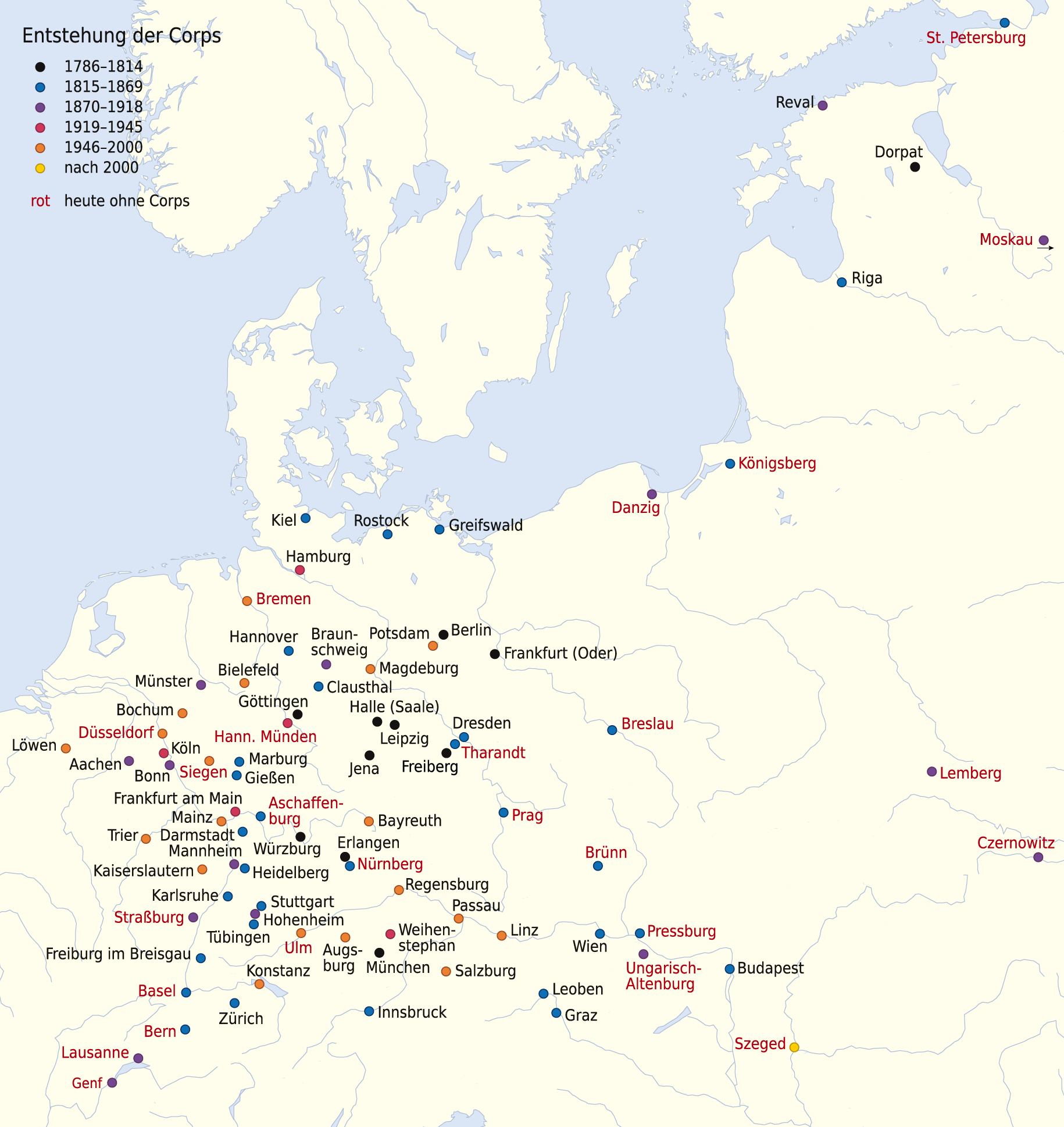
Map of the developing German Student Corps during the 18/19th century Europe.

- Lees Knowles: A day with corps-students in Germany
- Mark Twain describes his encounters with German corps students in chapters IV to VII of his travelogue A Tramp Abroad.
- Mark Twain describes specifically the fencing scene in A Tramp Abroad.
- Secondary web source of Mark Twain's descriptions of his encounters with German corps students in chapters IV to VII of his travelogue A Tramp Abroad.
- LaVaque-Manty, Mika (2006). "Dueling for Equality: Masculine Honor and the Modern Politics of Dignity" (PDF). Political Theory. 34 (6): 715–740. doi:10.1177/0090591706291727. S2CID 143261653.
- Gay, Peter (April 1992). "Mensur: The Cherished Scar". The Yale Review. 80 (1–2). ISBN 9780393033984.
- Paulgerhard Gladen: Die Kösener und Weinheimer Corps. Ihre Darstellung in Einzelchroniken. WJK-Verlag, Hilden 2007, ISBN 3-933892-24-4, S. 91–92.
- Hans Schüler: Weinheimer S.C.-Chronik, Darmstadt 1927, S. 434-454
- Michael Doeberl u. a. (Hrsg.): Das akademische Deutschland, Band 2: Die deutschen Hochschulen und ihre akademischen Bürger, Berlin 1931, S. 735
- Rolf-Joachim Baum: "Wir wollen Männer, wir wollen Taten!" – Deutsche Corpsstudenten 1848 bis heute. Berlin 1998, S. 7–12. ISBN 3-88680-653-7
- Paulgerhard Gladen: Geschichte der studentischen Korporationsverbände, Band 1, S. 53, Würzburg 1981
- Paulgerhard Gladen (2007), Die Kösener und Weinheimer Corps: Ihre Darstellung in Einzelchroniken (in German) (1. ed.), Hilden: WJK-Verlag, p. 200, ISBN 978-3-933892-24-9
