= Michael Doeberl =

German historian (1861–1928)

Michael Doeberl (15 January 1861, Waldsassen – 24 March 1928, Partenkirchen) was a German historian who specialized in Bavarian history.

He studied philology and history at the Ludwig-Maximilians-Universität München, obtaining his doctorate from the University of Erlangen in 1887. In 1894, he received his habilitation and in 1905 became an honorary professor. From 1917 to 1928, he held the chair of Bavarian history at the Ludwig-Maximilians-Universität München.

He was the founding chairman of the Gründungsvorsitzenden der Kommission für bayerische Landesgeschichte (Commission for Bavarian Regional History). The Michael Doeberl Preis is an annual award issued by the Institut für Bayerische Geschichte.

== Selected works ==
- Bayern und Frankreich vornehmlich unter Kurfürst Ferdinand Maria. 2 volumes, Munich 1900–1903 – Bavaria and France: mainly under Ferdinand Maria, Elector of Bavaria.
- Entwicklungsgeschichte Bayerns, (Historical development of Bavaria) 3 volumes; R. Oldenbourg, Munich 1906–1931.
  - Band 1, Von den ältesten Zeiten bis zum Westfälischen Frieden. 1906 – From the earliest times up to the Peace of Westphalia.
  - Band 2, Vom Westfälischen Frieden bis zum Tode König Maximilians I, (1. u. 2. Aufl.) 1912 – The Peace of Westphalia up until the death of King Maximilian I of Bavaria.
  - Band 3, Vom Regierungsantritt König Ludwigs I. bis zum Tode König Ludwigs II. mit einem Ausblick auf die innere Entwicklung Bayerns unter dem Prinzregenten Luitpold, (edition by Max Spindler) – From the accession of King Ludwig I of Bavaria to the death of King Ludwig II; with a view on the inner development of Bavaria under Prince Regent Luitpold of Bavaria.
- Bayern und Deutschland, (Bavaria and Germany) 3 volumes; Munich and Berlin 1922–1926.
  - Band 1, Bayern und die deutsche Frage in der Epoche des Frankfurter Parlaments. – Bavaria and the German question during the era of the Frankfurt Parliament.
  - Band 2, Bayern und die Bismarckische Reichsgründung. 1925 – Bavaria and the Bismarckian founding of the Reich.
  - Band 3, Bayern und das preußische Unionsprojekt – Bavaria and the Prussian Union project.
- König Ludwig I. der zweite Gründer der Ludwig-Maximilians-Universität München, 1926 – King Ludwig I, the second founder of the Ludwig-Maximilians-Universität München (LMU Munich).
