= Windeck Castle =

Windeck Castle may refer to:

- Windeck Castle (Bühl), Baden-Württemberg, Germany
- Windeck Castle (Weinheim), Baden-Württemberg, Germany

== See also ==
- Wildeck Castle
