= Weinheim =

- Town
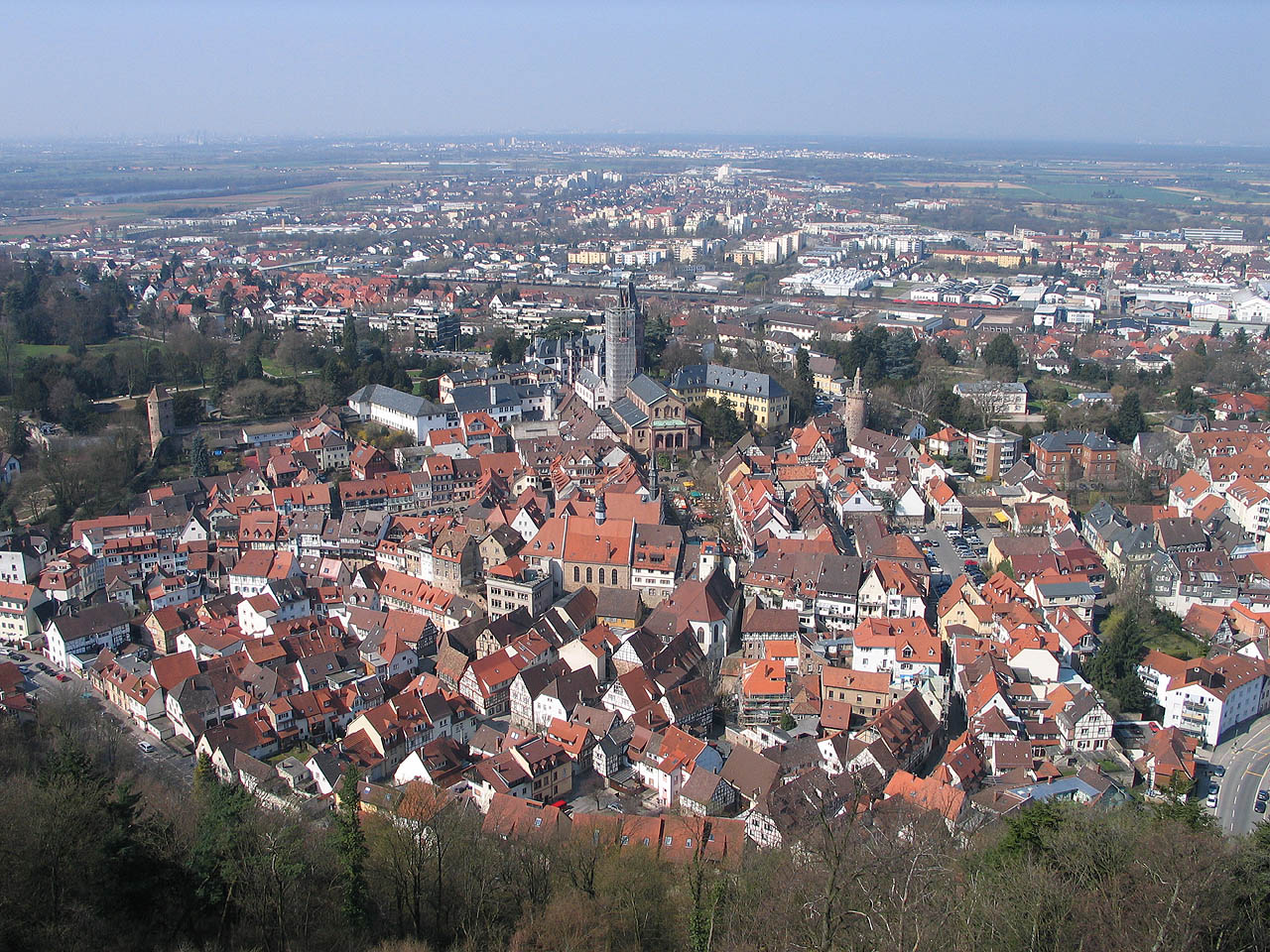
- Panorama of Weinheim from the south-east

- Flag Coat of arms

- Location of Weinheim within Rhein-Neckar-Kreis district
- Interactive map of Weinheim
- Location within Germany Location within Baden-Württemberg
- Coordinates: 49°33′N 08°40′E
- Country: Germany
- State: Baden-Württemberg
- Admin. region: Karlsruhe
- District: Rhein-Neckar-Kreis
- Subdivisions: Town centre and 10 quarters

Government
  - Mayor (2026–): Michael Möslang (CDU)

Area
  - Total: 58.11 km^{2} (22.44 sq mi)
- Elevation: 135 m (443 ft)

Population (2025-12-31)
  - Total: 45,919
  - Density: 790.2/km^{2} (2,047/sq mi)
- Time zone: UTC+01:00 (CET)
  - Summer (DST): UTC+02:00 (CEST)
- Postal codes: 69469
- Dialling codes: 06201
- Vehicle registration: HD
- Website: www.weinheim.de

Weinheim (German pronunciation: [ˈvaɪnhaɪm]; Palatine German: Woinem) is a town with about 43,000 inhabitants in northwest Baden-Württemberg, Germany. It is in the Rhine-Neckar Metropolitan Region, approximately 15 km (9 mi) north of Heidelberg and 10 km (6 mi) northeast of Mannheim. Weinheim is known as the "Zwei-Burgen-Stadt", the "town of two castles", after two fortresses overlooking the town from the edge of the Odenwald in the east.

== Geography ==
Weinheim is situated on the Bergstraße theme route on the western rim of the Odenwald. The old town lies in the valley, with the new part of town further to the west. The Market Square is filled with numerous cafes, as well as the old Rathaus (guildhall). Further to the south is the Schlossgarten (Palace Garden) and the Exotenwald (Exotic Forest), which contains species of trees imported from around the world, but mostly from North America and Japan.

== History ==
Weinheim celebrated its 1250th anniversary in 2005.

The earliest record of Weinheim dates back to 755 CE, when the name "Winenheim" was recorded in the Lorsch codex, the record book of Lorsch Abbey.

In 1000, Emperor Otto III bestowed on Weinheim the right to hold markets, and in 1065 the right to mint and issue coins. A new town developed next to the old town from 1250. In 1308, the old town was transferred to the Electorate of the Palatinate and from 1368 the whole town belonged to the Electorate. From the end of the 14th century, the whole town belonged to the Heidelberg Oberamt district. With the transfer to Baden in 1803, Weinheim became the seat of its own Amt, until unification with the Mannheim Landkreis (district) in 1936. Weinheim has been within the Rhein-Neckar-Kreis since its formation on 1 January 1973.

A Jewish community in Weinheim is recorded from 1228. There are records of Jewish persecution in 1298 (Rintfleisch massacres) and 1348–49 (Black Death persecutions) before the Jews were expelled from Weinheim in 1391. The Weinheim Jewish community began to grow again during the Thirty Years' War. There was a synagogue, a beth midrash, and a mikveh, and, in the 19th century, a school for boys together with a teacher-training college. The synagogue was destroyed in the Kristallnacht (9–10 November 1938) and the last remaining Jews were sent to Gurs on 22 October 1940.

== Local attractions ==
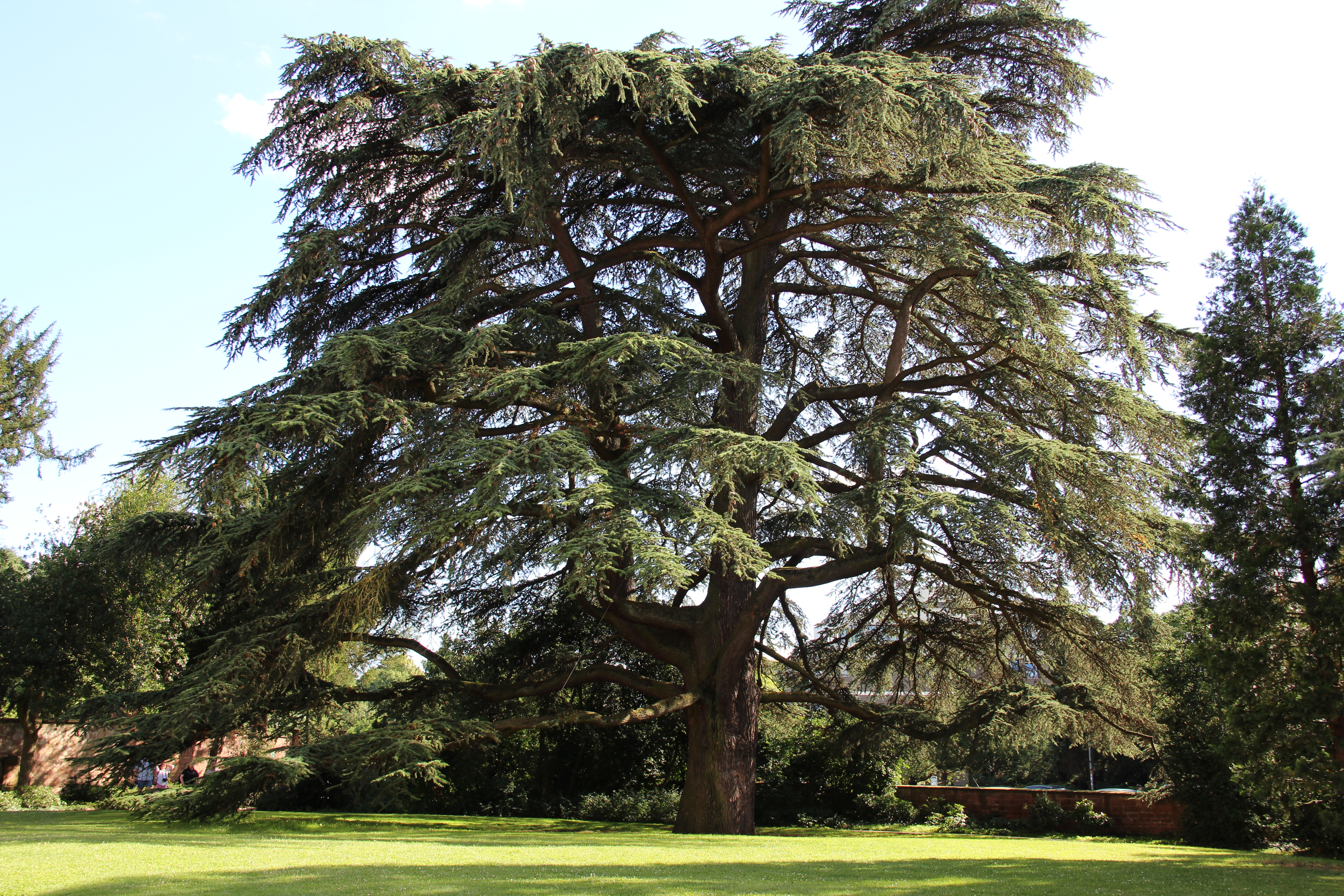
Lebanon Cedar in Schlosspark

- Windeck Castle, originally built around 1100 to protect the Lorsch monastery; it was badly damaged in the Thirty Years' War and again by Louis XIV of France in the Nine Years' War.
- Wachenburg Castle, built between 1907 and 1928 by German Student Corps fraternities; the annual convention of the Weinheimer Senioren-Convent is held at the Wachenburg.
- The Market Square
- The Schloss, home of the town council
- Gerberbach Quarter, the former tanning district
- Schlosspark
- Waidsee Lido (Strandbad Waidsee), swimming beach on the Waidsee artificial lake
- Miramar (Weinheim) thermal spa and sauna complex, next to the Waidsee lake
- Exotenwald Weinheim, a forest arboretum
- Schau- und Sichtungsgarten Hermannshof, a botanical garden

=== Museum ===
Weinheim's town museum occupies the former local headquarters of the Teutonic Order and holds exhibits about Weinheim and its surroundings. Exhibits include archaeology from the prehistoric through to the Merovingian dynasty, the highlight of which is the Nächstenbach bronze hoard of 76 objects from the late Bronze Age, and displays documenting the medieval and modern social history of the town together with works from contemporary artists.

== Events ==
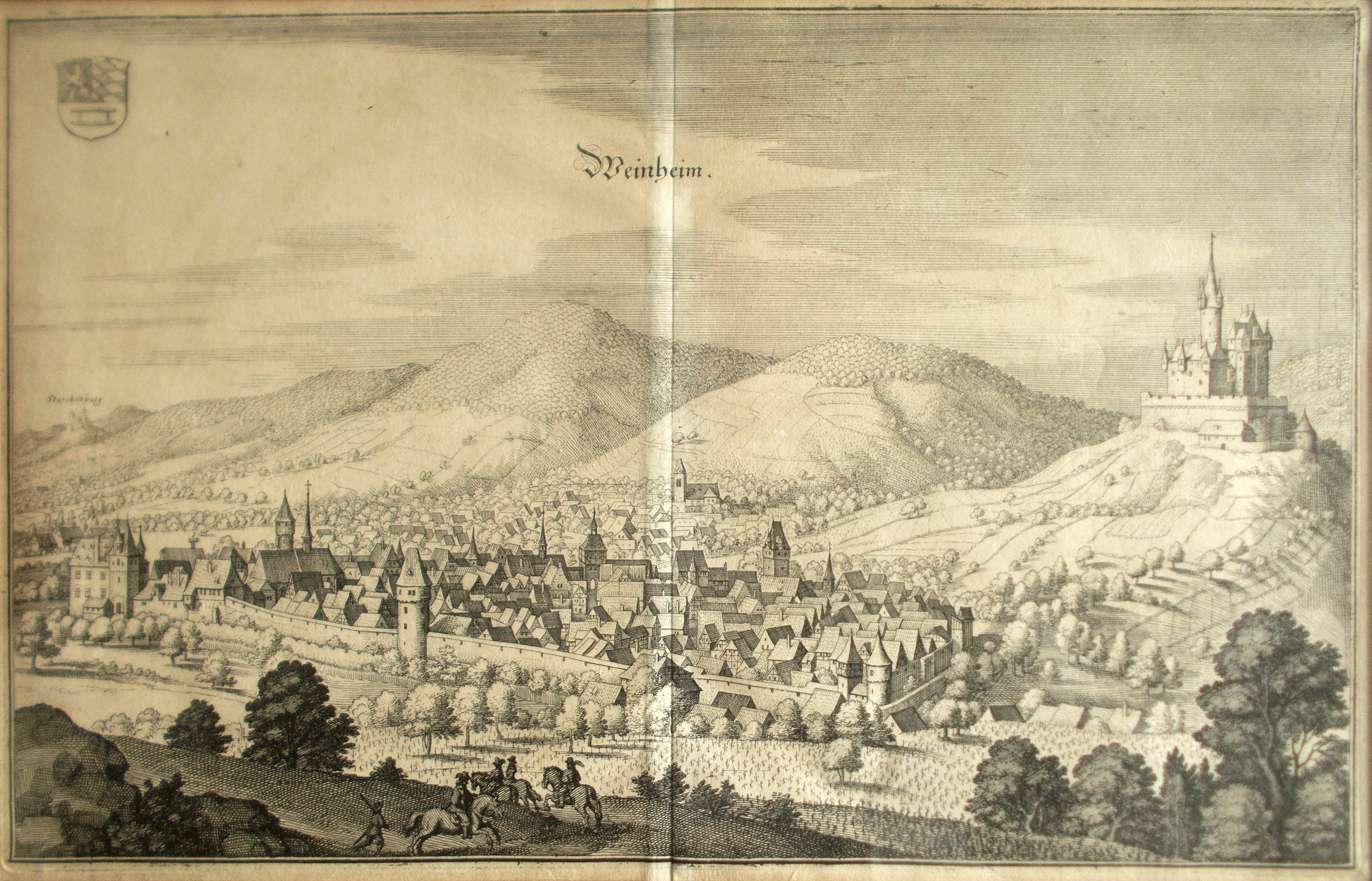
Engraving of Weinheim by Matthäus Merian the elder (1645)

- February: High-jump Gala, with world class high-jumpers
- March: the Sommertagszug, a festival celebrating the coming of summer.
- May/June (near Ascension Day): day of the Weinheimer Senioren-Convents
- June–August: Weinheim's summer of culture
- June: Scheuerfest (barn party) in Ritschweier
- July: the Weinheim road race
- May–September: Kerwes in Rippenweier, Sulzbach, Lützelsachsen, Oberflockenbach und Hohensachsen
- August (second weekend, Friday-Monday): Weinheim's Kerwe
- September (first Friday-Sunday): Weinheimer UKW-Tagung, a three-day international amateur radio meeting held annually since 1956
- October: Bergsträßer Winzerfest (lit. "mountain-road vintner festival") in Lützelsachsen

== Economy ==
- Freudenberg Group
- Wiley-VCH publishers
- SAP SE

== Transport ==
=== Trains ===
Weinheim has two main train stations on the Main-Neckar Railway: Weinheim (Bergstraße) station (served by regional and long-distance IC trains) and Lützelsachsen (served by regional trains). These provide connections to Frankfurt, Hamburg and other destinations within Germany.

Weinheim is also served by the OEG tramway, which visits the town on the journey between Mannheim and Heidelberg.

=== Air ===
The closest airports to Weinheim are:

- Frankfurt Airport
- Baden Airpark

== Twin towns – sister cities ==
Weinheim is twinned with:

- Anet, France
- Cavaillon, France
- Eisleben, Germany
- Imola, Italy
- Ramat Gan, Israel
- Varces-Allières-et-Risset, France

== Population ==
Population figures are made up of a combination of official estimations, Volkszählungsergebnisse (semi-official figures, demarcated by a ¹), and official statistics based on place of residence (Hauptwohnsitz) registrations.

Year	Population
1439	1,780
1774	1,774
1812	4,039
1830	5,000
1 December 1871	6,350
1 December 1880 ¹	7,159
1 December 1890 ¹	8,243
1 December 1900 ¹	11,167
1 December 1910 ¹	14,170
8 Oktober 1919 ¹	14,550
16 June 1925 ¹	15,793
16 June 1933 ¹	17,486
17 May 1939 ¹	18,561

Year	Population
December 1945 ¹	19,944
13 September 1950 ¹	25,199
6 June 1961 ¹	27,859
27 May 1970 ¹	29,670
31 December 1975	41,005
31 December 1980	41,654
27 May 1987 ¹	41,934
31 December 1990	42,241
31 December 1995	42,812
31 December 2000	42,520
31 December 2005	43,417
30 June 2006	42,745
31 December 2010	43,014
31 December 2015	44,928
31 December 2016	45,174
31 December 2017	45,311
31 December 2018	45,462
31 December 2019	45,581
31 December 2020	45,497
31 December 2021	45,321
31 December 2022	45,417
31 December 2023	45,524
31 December 2024	45,574
31 December 2025	45,640

¹ These are taken from a Volkszählungsergebnis.

== Notable people ==
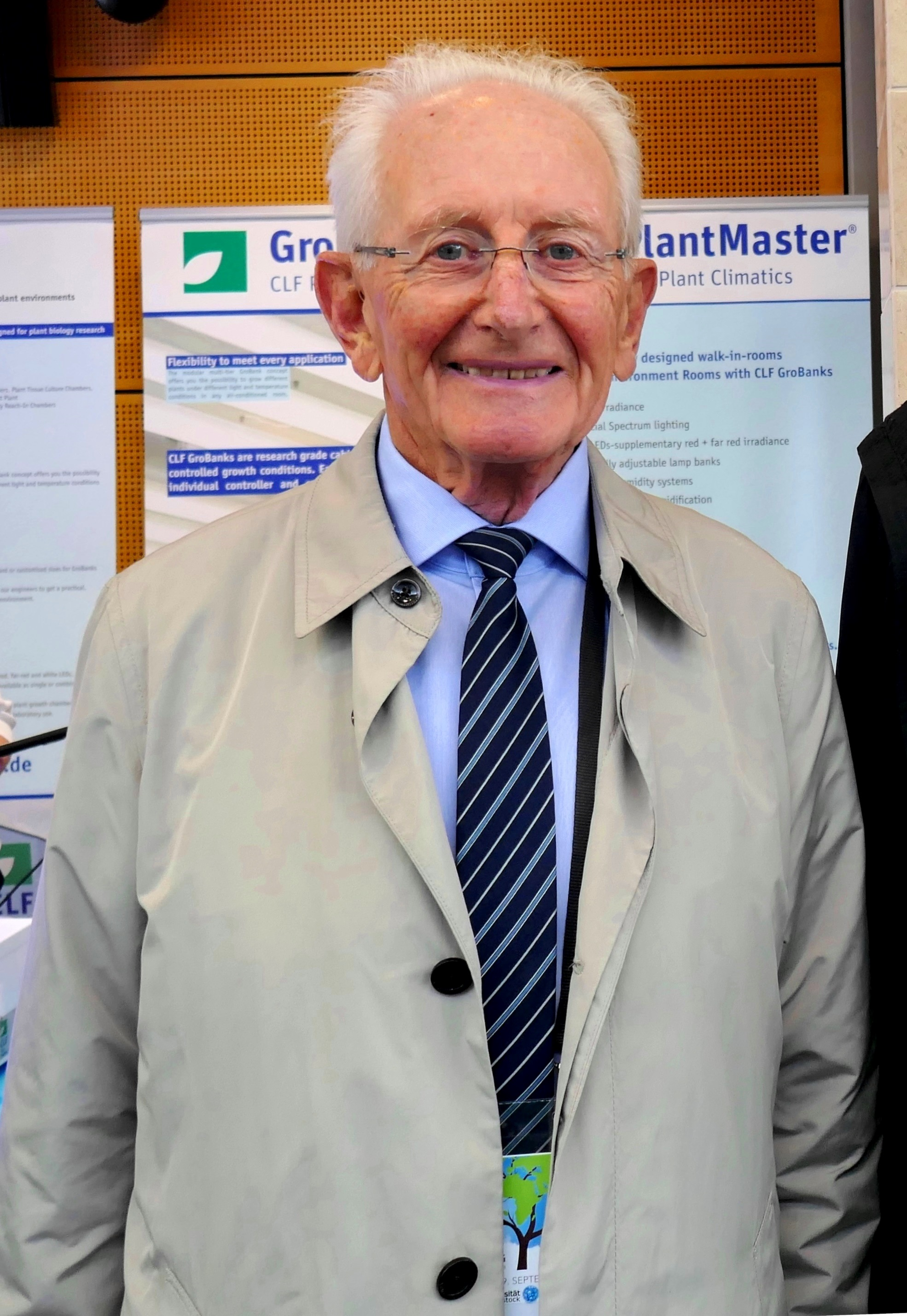
Hartmut K. Lichtenthaler, 2019

- Federico Rauch (1786–1829), colonel who fought and died in Argentina
- Heinrich Hübsch (1795–1863), a German architect, head of public works in Karlsruhe
- Philipp Bickel, (DE Wiki) (1829–1914), baptist theologian and publisher
- Valentine Dell (1829–1885), newspaper editor, publisher, politician and U.S. marshal in Arkansas.
- August Bender, (DE Wiki) (1847–1926), chemist and entrepreneur
- Wilhelm Platz, (DE Wiki) (1866–1929), author and factory owner
- Richard Freudenberg (1892–1975), politician (FDP)
- Erwin Linder (1903–1968), a German stage, film and TV actor.
- Hartmut K. Lichtenthaler (born 1934), botanist, plant physiologist and university professor.
- Werner Andreas Albert (1935–2019), an Australian conductor.
- Valentino Bellucci (1975–2021), an Italian philosopher, sociologist, poet, painter and essayist.

=== Sport ===
- Heidi Mohr (born 1967), footballer, played 104 games for Germany women's national team
- Ralf Sonn (born 1967), high jumper
- Sven Barth (born 1980), racing driver
- Stefan Zinnow (born 1980), a former footballer who played 276 games

=== Worked in the town ===
- Karl Friedrich Bender, (DE Wiki) (1806–1869), theologian, teacher, principal of the Erziehungsanstalt für Knaben (boys' school)
- Ingrid Noll (born 1935), a German thriller writer, (e.g. Die Apothekerin), lived in Weinheim
- Markus Kuhn (born 1986), NFL player

=== Honorary citizens ===
The town of Weinheim has made the following people honorary citizens (Ehrenbürger):

- 1894: Carl Johann Freudenberg, Geheimer Kommerzienrat (royal economist)
- 1904: Erhard Bissinger, Consul general
- 1913: Aute Bode, chief engineer and the architect behind the Wachenburg
- 1918: Hermann Ernst Freudenberg, Geheimer Kommerzienrat (royal economist)
- 1922: Georg Friedrich Vogler, vice-mayor
- 1923: Adam Karrillon, doctor and author
- 1928: Emil Hartmann, construction engineer
- 1928: Prof. Arthur Wienkoop, Architect
- 1933: Paul von Hindenburg, German President
- 1940: Georg Peter Nickel, agriculturist
- 1949: Richard Freudenberg, factory owner
- 1953: Hans Freudenberg, factory owner
- 1954: Sepp Herberger, manager of the German World Cup winning side of 1954
- 1962: Wilhelm Brück, Lord Mayor
- 1986: Theo Gießelmann, Lord Mayor
- 2004: Dieter Freudenberg, factory owner
- 2004: Wolfgang Daffinger, mayor and representative in the Landtag
- 2005: Uwe Kleefoot, Lord Mayor
- 2011: Hans-Werner Hector, mathematician
- 2011: Josephine Hector, city patron
- 2023: Ingrid Noll, author
