= Lichtenthaler =

Lichtenthaler is a German surname. Notable people with the surname include:

- Hartmut K. Lichtenthaler (born 1934), German biologist and chemist
- Ulrich Lichtenthaler (born 1978), German economist
