= Valentine Dell =

American politician, educator and journalist

Member of the Arkansas Senate

Personal details
- Born: November 8, 1829 Weinheim, Grand Duchy of Baden
- Died: October 10, 1885 (aged 55) Fort Smith, Arkansas, U.S.
- Occupation: Newspaper editor
- Profession: Journalist

Valentine Dell (November 8, 1829 - October 10, 1885) was an educator, newspaper editor and publisher, politician, and U.S. marshal in Arkansas. He served terms in the Arkansas Senate and helped establish Fort Smith's first free public school system. He immigrated to the United States from Germany. He eventually settled in Fort Smith. He had several children including a son Valentine Dell Jr.

He published the New Era in Fort Smith.
