= Corps Cisaria =

Coat of Arms	Zirkel
Basic data
Bundesland:	Bavaria
University:	LMU Munich; Technical University of Munich
Date founded:	March 15, 1851 in Augsburg
Umbrella organization:	WSC
Senioren-Convent:	Münchener SC
Admitted into the SC:	1851
Motto:	Concordia crescamus
Motto of arms:	In virtute honos
Website:	www.cisaria.de

Cisaria Munich is a German Student Corps (Fraternity) in the Weinheimer Senioren-Convent (WSC), one of the oldest umbrella organizations of German fraternities. As a corps, Cisaria practices academic fencing and wears Colours. Its membership comprises students and alumni of LMU Munich, the Technical University of Munich, and other Munich colleges and universities. Its members are called Cisaren. Cisaria is a member of the Münchener Senioren-Convent (MSC). As the oldest local WSC Corps, at present it also permanently presides the MWSC, the local union of Weinheimer Corps.

== Coat of arms ==
The coat of arms of Corps Cisaria consists of four fields. The upper left one displays the city arms of Augsburg on red ground; the Roman numerals resemble the date the corps was founded. In the upper right corner the Zirkel (a kind of signature) of Cisaria is depicted. The lower left field shows a pair of crossed "Korbschläger" in front of the red-white-green colours. The letters i, v and h represent the motto of arms, in viturte honos. The last field, to the lower right, displays colours and Zirkel of the former associate corps Normannia.

== Couleur ==
Cisaria wears the colours red - white - green. The colours originate from the city arms of Augsburg. The colours of the Fuchs (pledge) are red - white. Cisaren also wear red caps.

== Notable members ==
- Heinrich von Buz († 1918), industrialist and inventor
- Karl von Brug († 1923), Bavarian general and aviator
- Richard Schachner († 1936), architect, professor and headmaster of the Technical University of Munich
- Rudolf Nebel († 1978), rocket design engineer
- Otto Haxel († 1998), nuclear physicist
