= Federico Rauch =

German-born colonel of Argentina

Colonel Federico Rauch

Personal details
- Born: August 9, 1790 Weinheim, Baden, Holy Roman Empire
- Died: March 28, 1829 (aged 38) Las Vizcacheras, Buenos Aires Province, Argentina
- Party: Unitarian Party
- Spouse: Narcisa Pérez Millán
- Occupation: Military man
- Profession: army

Military service
- Allegiance: First French Empire (Argentina) United Provinces of the River Plate
- Branch/service: Grande Armée; Argentine Army
- Years of service: c. 1805–1829
- Rank: Coronel
- Unit: Guardia del Salto (1821–1829)
- Commands: Imperial Guard; Frontera Norte de la provincia de Buenos Aires; Unitarian Army
- Battles/wars: Napoleonic Wars; Military campaigns against Indigenous; Argentine Civil Wars

Federico Rauch (né Friedrich Rauch) (Weinheim, Electoral Palatinate, 1790 – Las Vizcacheras, Argentina, 1829) was a German-born colonel of Argentina. He died in the Battle of Vizcacheras.

== Biography ==
He was born in Weinheim, in the Electorate of the Palatinate, a territory that is now part of Baden-Württemberg, Germany. Rauch gained military experience in the Prussian Army under the command of Field Marshal Gebhard Leberecht von Blücher, who played a decisive role in the defeat of Napoleon at the Battle of Waterloo. After Napoleon’s fall, Rauch emigrated to the Río de la Plata region.

Federico Rauch arrived in the United Provinces of the Río de la Plata on 23 March 1819 and immediately joined the army with the rank of Second lieutenant, by commission signed by the Supreme Director of the United Provinces of the Río de la Plata, Juan Martín de Pueyrredón.

He was later promoted to captain on 7 September 1820 and to major on 13 June 1821. Upon his promotion to major, he was transferred to the Húsares de Buenos Aires regiment, where he remained for the rest of his military career and eventually attained the rank of colonel at the age of 33.

Rauch’s campaigns against Indigenous peoples formed part of the earlier frontier conflicts that preceded the later Conquest of the Desert in the late nineteenth century, which was carried out under Adolfo Alsina and Julio Argentino Roca.

On 4 August 1827, Rauch married Narcisa Pérez Millán at the San José de los Arrecifes parish church.
