= Weinheimer Senioren-Convent =

German umbrella organization for student groups

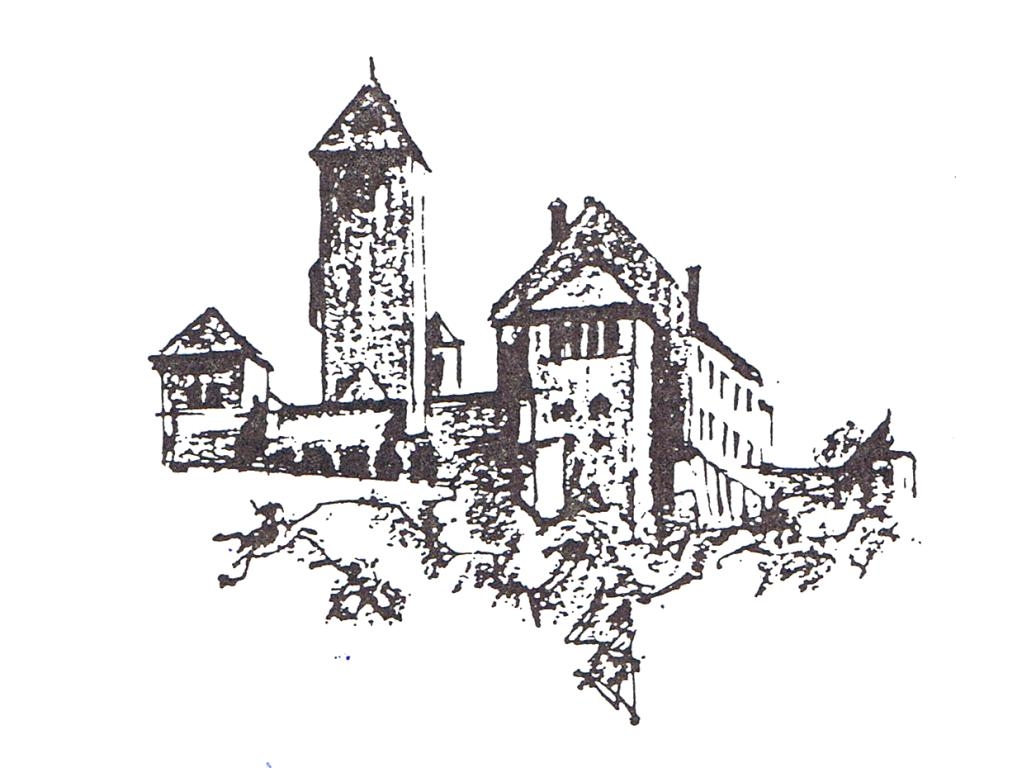
- Wachenburg, the symbol of WSC
- Founded: April 7, 1863; 163 years ago Frankfurt, Germany
- Type: Umbrella
- Affiliation: Independent
- Status: Active
- Emphasis: Studentenverbindungen
- Scope: National
- Motto: Jemer bereit stan! "Always be ready!"
- Symbol: Wachenburg
- Publication: CORPS - Das Magazin
- Members: 58 active
- Headquarters: Büro des WVAC; Friedrichstraße 32; Weinheim 69469; Germany
- Website: www.die-corps.de

Weinheimer Senioren-Convent (abbreviation: WSC) is the second oldest association of German Studentenverbindungen. It comprises 58 German Student Corps, all of which are based upon the principle of tolerance.

== History ==
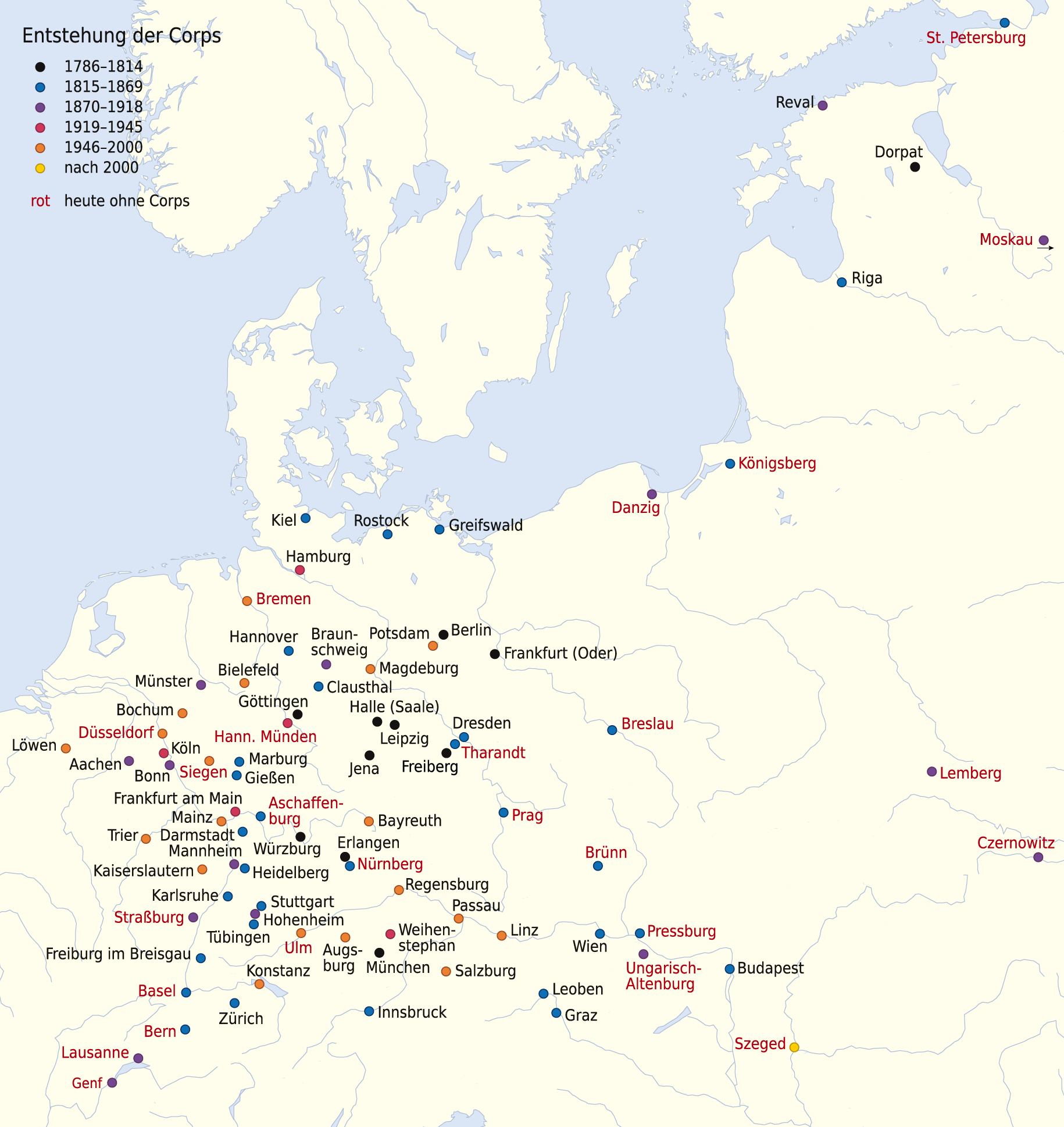
Member corps locations

Weinheimer Senioren-Convent was founded in Frankfurt, Germany in 1863 under the name Allgemeiner Senioren-Convent (ASC). It formed as an association for German Studentenverbindungen that were based on the principle of tolerance. It moved to Weinheimn, Germany near Heidelberg in 1864. It adopted the name of Weinheimer Senioren Convent in 1867.

It merged with the Corps of the Rudolstädter Senioren-Convent (RSC) and the Naumburger Senioren-Convent (NSC) in 1934. Since 1955, the Weinheimer Senioren-Convent has had an association treaty with the Kösener Senioren-Convents-Verband (KSCV), the oldest and largest association of Corps).

As of 2024, Weinheimer Senioren-Convent has 58 German Student Corps members. Its headquarters is located at It is located at Friedrichstraße 32 in Weinhem. It is the second oldest association of German Studentenverbindungen.

== Symbols ==
The motto of Weinheimer Senioren Convents is Jemer bereit stan! or "Always be ready!" The symbol of WSC is its castle, Wachenburg. Its publication is CORPS - Das Magazin.

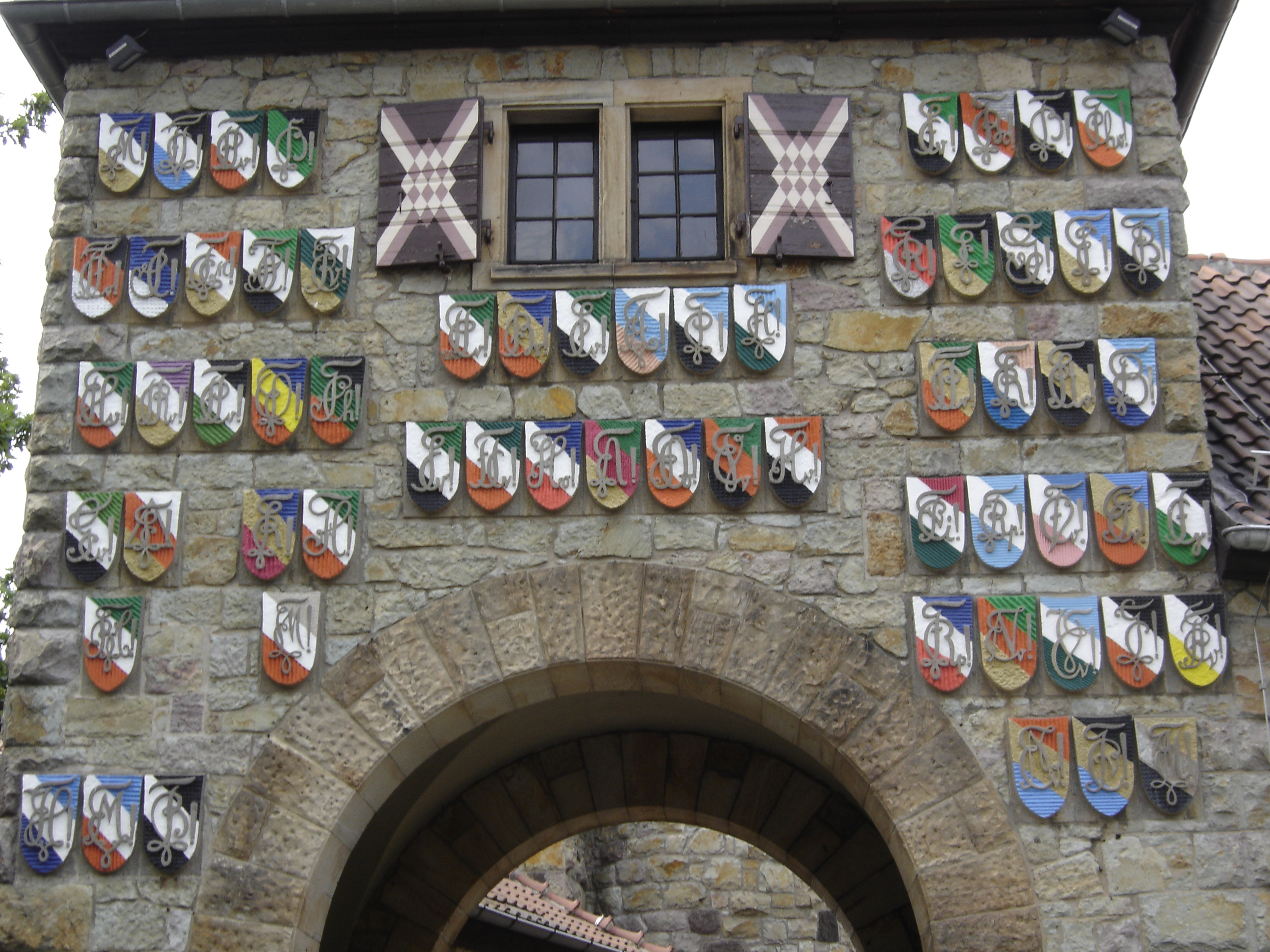
Coats of arms of member Corps at the entrance to the Wachenburg castle

== Castle ==
Weinheimer Senioren-Convent built Wachenburg castle near Weinheim between 1907 and 1928. The castle serves as a meeting place and headquarters for the association.

== List of Corps ==
In alphabetic order with Corps present on the English Wikipedia (links in blue) first. Pages in the German Wikipedia can further be reached by clicking on the (de).

Corps	Location	Senioren-Convent	Foundation	WSC entry	Colors	Fuchsen-colors	Crest	"Zirkel"	Cartel	House
Marko-Guestphalia Aachen (de)	Aachen	SC zu Aachen	1871	1871	(linden)green-white-black	green-white				.Haus.
Delta Aachen	Aachen	SC zu Aachen	1871	1903	white-red-gold	gold-red-gold				.Haus.
Montania Aachen	Aachen	SC zu Aachen	1872	1920	green-white-red	green-white-green				.Haus.
Saxo-Montania zu Freiberg und Dresden in Aachen (de)	Aachen	SC zu Aachen	1798	1873	blue-white-gold	blue-white				.Haus.
Palaeo-Teutonia (Teutonia Freiberg) Aachen (de)	Aachen	SC zu Aachen	1867	1873	black-white-blue	black-white			Viererbund (league of four)	
Saxonia-Berlin zu Aachen	Aachen	SC zu Aachen	1867	1891	black-green-gold	gold-green-gold			Fünferbund (league of five)	.Haus.
Franconia Fribergensis (de)	Aachen	SC zu Aachen	1838	1882	green-gold-red	green-gold-green				.Haus.
Rhenania ZAB (de)	Braunschweig	SC zu Braunschweig	1855	1863	blue-gold-red	blue-gold-blue			Fünferbund (league of five)	.Haus.
Teutonia-Hercynia Braunschweig (de)	Braunschweig	SC zu Braunschweig	1866	1876	green-white-red					
Marchia Braunschweig	Braunschweig	SC zu Braunschweig	1893	1927	grey-white-red					.Haus.
Frisia Braunschweig	Braunschweig	SC zu Braunschweig	1881	1920	black-gold-light blue					.Haus.
Corps Berlin (de)	Berlin	SC zu Braunschweig	1859/2009	1891	blue-red-green				Blaues Kartell (blue cartel)	.Haus.
Hercynia Clausthal (de)	Clausthal	SC zu Clausthal	1866	1874/1905	light blue-white-dark blue	light blue-white				
Montania Clausthal (de)	Clausthal	SC zu Clausthal	1868	1874/1905	blue-white-red	blue-white-red			Viererbund (league of four)	
Borussia Clausthal	Clausthal	SC zu Clausthal	1875	1892	black-white-black	black-white				
Hassia Darmstadt (de)	Darmstadt	SC zu Darmstadt	1840	1874	green-white-red	green-white-green				
Rhenania Darmstadt	Darmstadt	SC zu Darmstadt	1872	1874	violett-white-gold	violett-white				.Haus.
Franconia Darmstadt (de)	Darmstadt	SC zu Darmstadt	1889	1895	black-white-lindgreen	black-white				
Obotritia Darmstadt	Darmstadt	SC zu Darmstadt	1861 in Hanover	1899	blue-yellow-red	blue-yellow-blue				
Chattia Darmstadt	Darmstadt	SC zu Darmstadt	1894	1908	black-green-red	black-green				.Haus.
Hermunduria Leipzig zu Mannheim-Heidelberg	Mannheim	SC zu Darmstadt	1898	1934	violett-white-gold	violett-white-violett				.Haus.
Rheno-Nicaria zu Mannheim und Heidelberg (Rheno-Nicaria zu Mannheim und Heidelberg|de)	Mannheim	SC zu Darmstadt	1909	1953	black-white-green	black-white-black				
Franconia Berlin zu Kaiserslautern	Kaiserslautern	SC zu Darmstadt	1850	1958	green-red-gold	green-red-green			Grünes Kartell (green cartel)	.Haus.
Thuringia Heidelberg	Heidelberg	SC zu Darmstadt	1908	1995	black-karmesinred-white	karmesinred-white				.Haus.
Saxonia Hannover (de)	Hanover	SC zu Hannover	1852	1863	green-white-black	black-white-black			Saxenkartell (saxon cartel)	
Slesvico-Holsatia Hannover (de)	Hanover	SC zu Hannover	1852	1869	blue-white-red	blue-white-blue			Fünferbund (league of five)	.Haus.
Alemannia-Thuringia zu Magdeburg (de)	Magdeburg	SC zu Hannover	1865	1874	green-red-gold					.Haus.
Hannovera Hannover (de)	Hanover	SC zu Hannover	1866	1898	red-white-black	red-white-red				
Hannoverania Hannover	Hanover	SC zu Hannover	1856	1934	blue-red-gold				Blaues Kartell (blue cartel)	.Haus.
Normannia Hannover (de)	Hanover	SC zu Hannover	1859	1952	prussian blue-white-frühlingslaubgreen				Grünes Kartell (green cartel)	
Irminsul Hamburg (de)	Hamburg	SC zu Hannover	1880	1934	light blue-silber-black				Weißes Kartell (white cartel)	
Rhenania Hamburg	Hamburg	SC zu Hannover	1920	1989	white-black-red					
Agronomia Hallensis zu Göttingen (de)	Göttingen	SC zu Hannover	1863	1934	white-black-white					
Alemannia Kiel	Kiel	SC zu Hannover	1876	1953	blue-white-green					.Haus.
Baltica-Borussia Danzig zu Bielefeld (de)	Bielefeld	SC zu Hannover	1860	1905	light blue-black-white					.Haus.
Frisia Göttingen – Corps der Friesen und Lüneburger (de)	Göttingen	SC zu Hannover	1811	2004	blue-red-black					
Franconia Karlsruhe (de)	Karlsruhe	SC zu Karlsruhe	1839	1863	green-white-red				Fünferbund (league of five)	.Haus.
Saxonia Karlsruhe (de)	Karlsruhe	SC zu Karlsruhe	1856	1863	green-white-black				Saxenkartell (saxon cartel)	
Alemannia Karlsruhe (de)	Karlsruhe	SC zu Karlsruhe	1860	1863	white-light blue-pink					
Friso-Cheruskia Karlsruhe (de)	Karlsruhe	SC zu Karlsruhe	1860	1863	light blue-white-dark blue					.Haus.
Silingia Breslau zu Köln (de)	Cologne	SC zu Köln (vormals SC zu Köln-Bonn)	1877	1926	blue-gold-white					
Franco-Guestphalia zu Köln	Cologne	SC zu Köln (vormals SC zu Köln-Bonn)	1879	1934	red-white-gold				Weißes Kartell (white cartel)	.Haus.
Cisaria (de)	Munich	Münchner SC, Weinheimer Corps	1851	1912	(krapp)red-white-green					
Vitruvia	Munich	Münchner SC, Weinheimer Corps	1863	1912	blue-white-pink					.Haus.
Germania München (de)	Munich	Münchner SC, Weinheimer Corps	1863	1912	blue-gold-red					
Suevo-Guestphalia (de)	Munich	Münchner SC, Weinheimer Corps	1877	1906	black-white-green				Grünes Kartell (green cartel)	
Normannia-Vandalia	Munich	Münchner SC, Weinheimer Corps	1869	1911	green-red-gold light blue-white-green	green-red				.Haus.
Saxo-Thuringia (de)	Munich	Münchner SC, Weinheimer Corps	1882	1934	light blue-white-orange				Blaues Kartell (blue cartel)	.Haus.
Alemannia München (de)	Munich	Münchner SC, Weinheimer Corps	1855	1934	black-gold-green					.Haus.
Pomerania-Silesia Bayreuth	Bayreuth	Münchner SC, Weinheimer Corps	1865	1891	light blue-white-gold					.Haus.
Saxo-Borussia Freiberg (de)	Freiberg	Sächsischer SC	1842	1877	black-green-white					.Haus.
Altsachsen Dresden (de)	Dresden	Sächsischer SC	1861	1927	grey-green-gold				Blaues Kartell (blue cartel)	
Teutonia Dresden	Dresden	Sächsischer SC	1859	1875	white-red-black				Viererbund (league of four)	
Teutonia Stuttgart (de)	Stuttgart	SC zu Stuttgart	1852	1863	green-gold-red				Viererbund (league of four)	
Rhenania Stuttgart	Stuttgart	SC zu Stuttgart	1859	1863	pink-white-blue					.Haus.
Stauffia Stuttgart (de)	Stuttgart	SC zu Stuttgart	1847	1863	black-gold-black				Fünferbund (league of five)	
Bavaria Stuttgart	Stuttgart	SC zu Stuttgart	1886	1894	light blue-white-dark blue					.Haus.
Germania Hohenheim (de)	Hohenheim (Stuttgart)	SC zu Stuttgart	1903	1922	black-white-red					.Haus.
Marchia Greifswald (de)	Greifswald	without SC	1881	1934	pink-white-pink				Weißes Kartell (white cartel)	
