= Exotenwald Weinheim =

Arboretum in Baden-Württemberg, Germany

Coordinates: 49.5451°N 8.6845°E

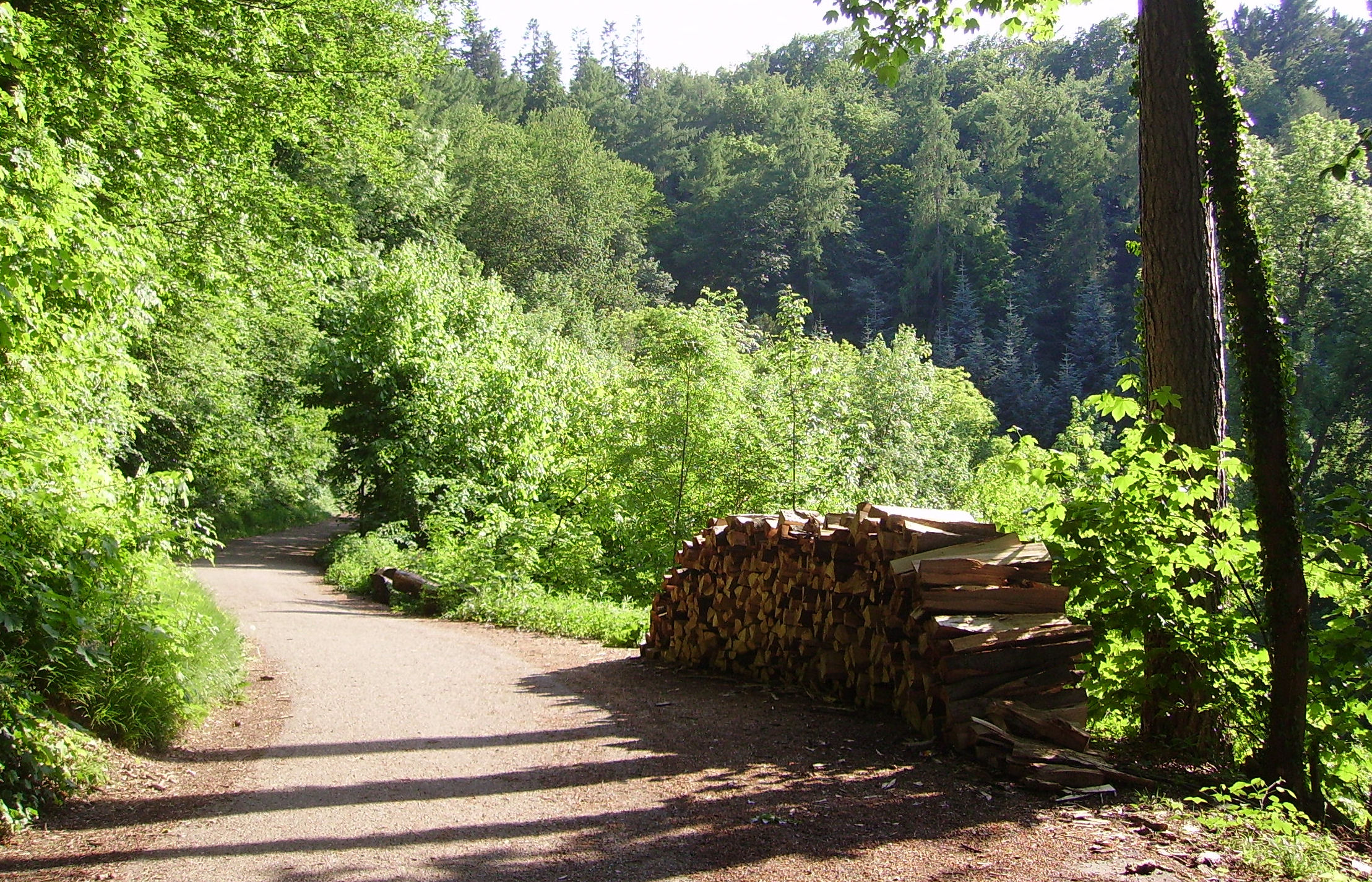
Exotenwald Weinheim

The Exotenwald Weinheim (about 60 hectares) is a forest arboretum located beside the Schlosspark in Weinheim, Baden-Württemberg, Germany. It is open daily without charge.

The arboretum was established in 1871 by Christian Friedrich Gustav Freiherr von Berckheim (1817–1889), former Minister of State and Großhofmeister at the court in Karlsruhe, on the grounds of a baroque estate founded in 1725. His initial plantings were extensive – between 1872 and 1883 he planted some 12,494 trees on 36 hectares – with specimens purchased predominantly from specialist nurseries in Orléans, Ghent, and Exeter. Approximately 1460 sequoia trees were planted in this interval within a 2-hectare (4.9-acre) site. Although the climate has not proved entirely hospitable, and the original catalog of 150 species has subsequently dwindled to about 50, many mature specimens still remain, including original plantings of Calocedrus decurrens, Sequoiadendron giganteum, Pinus jeffreyi, Pinus ponderosa, and Thuja plicata.

After Gustav's death, the arboretum was neglected for several decades until his grandson, Christian Philipp Graf von Berckheim, became owner. He planted a further 8.25 hectares of exotic trees, with plantings in the years before World War II focused primarily on East Asia and especially Japan, including specimens of Cercidiphyllum japonicum, Cryptomeria japonica, and Magnolia hypoleuca. In 1955 the arboretum was sold to the state of Baden-Württemberg. Since then, it has been augmented with South American and New Zealand plantings, with continued expansion of its European, Asian, North American, and North African collections, and an emphasis on trees from China and Korea. It now contains about 130 tree species.

== See also ==
- Schau- und Sichtungsgarten Hermannshof
- List of botanical gardens in Germany
