= Corps Franconia Darmstadt =

German student fraternal organization

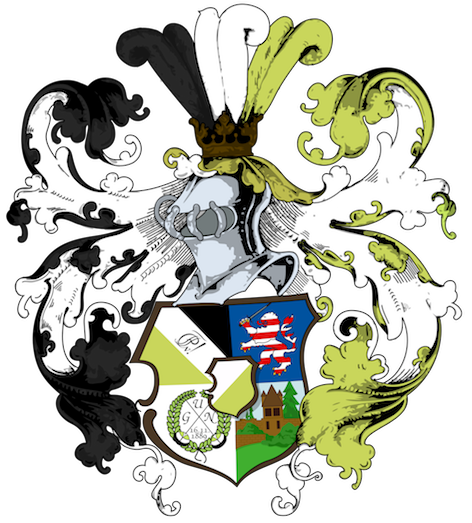
- Founded: November 16, 1889; 136 years ago Darmstadt, Germany
- Type: German Student Corps
- Affiliation: WSC
- Status: Active
- Scope: Local
- Motto: Nec temere – nec timide! "Neither act thoughtlessly - nor timidly"
- Colors: Black, White, Lime Green, with Silver edging
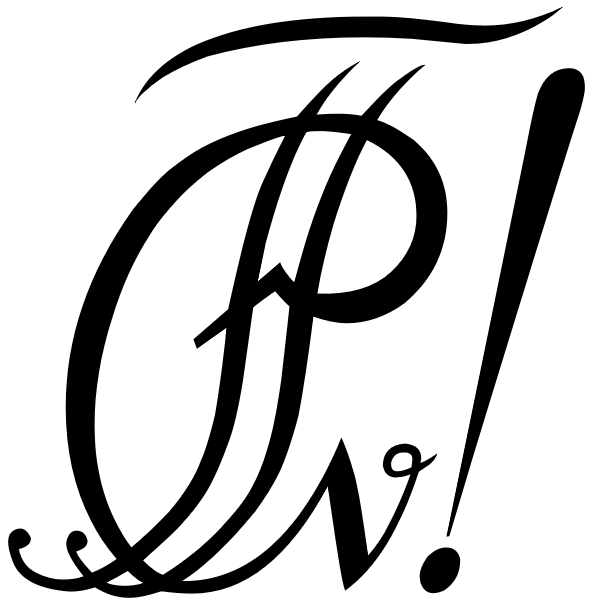
- Zirkel
- Chapters: 2
- Members: 170 active
- Headquarters: Alfred-Messel-Weg 3 Darmstadt, Hesse 64287; Germany
- Website: www.franconia-darmstadt.de

The Corps Franconia Darmstadt is a fraternity founded on November 16, 1889, in Darmstadt. It is one of the 59 German Student Corps within the Weinheimer Senioren-Convent (WSC), the second oldest federation of classical European fraternal corporations, with roots dating back to the 15th century and fraternities founded in several European countries.

The Corps is a color-bearing fraternal corporation that keeps alive the tradition of Academic fencing. Membership in the fraternity is open to men studying at one of Darmstadt's universities such as TU Darmstadt and University of Applied Sciences. Corps Franconia's members wear the traditional colour, coloured stripes, in black/ white/ lime-green. The fraternity teaches and expects tolerance from its members, stemming from diverse ethnic, national, religious and political backgrounds.

In particular, the Corps is known for its foundation by Wilhelm von Opel and the active membership of his brother Carl von Opel as well as his nephew Hans von Opel, founders and owners of the German automobile company Opel.

In 2016/2017 for the second time, the Corps chaired the umbrella organisation of the Weinheimer Senioren-Convent. On May 26 of 2017, by the initiative of Corps Franconia, the WSC first opened the membership for Corps of foreign countries.

A characteristic of Corps Franconia is its cooperation with the American fraternity Tau Kappa Epsilon which evoked mutual memberships.

== History ==
On November 16, 1889, the fraternity was founded as an academic cycling club (Academischer Radfahrer-Verein) and was approved by the directory of the Technische Universität Darmstadt on January 9, 1890. In its beginning, Wilhelm von Opel filled the position of the vice president and as a passionate racing driver, he won a lot of races and prizes in the name of the Corps. As the reputation of cycling clubs sunk, the club was converted to the voluntarily fencing fraternity Franconia. Just a few months later, in March 1893, Franconia was authorized by the TU Darmstadt.

On June 26 of 1893, the brotherhood converted to the Corps Franconia. On Jule 11 later that year, the Corps was approved by the Darmstädter Senioren-Convent, the community of all Corps in Darmstadt and on Whitsun 1895 it was admitted by the Weinheimer Senioren-Convent, the community of all technical Corps in Germany.

In comparison to other university cities, the relationship between the Corps in Darmstadt and the students was regarded as "convenient" in the end of the 19th and beginning of the 20th century. In many cases, members of the Corps led the students committee of the university.

=== Reconstitution after World War I ===
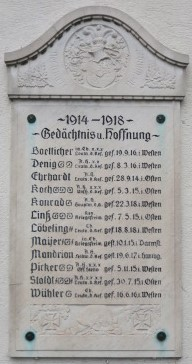
Memorial in honour of the fallen corps members

The first World War represents a turning-point of the Corps, especially as 12 corps brothers let their lives in the war. In 1920/1921 the members of the Corps erected a memorial to their remembrance. In the winter semester of 1918/1919 the corps activities could be continued.

Already before the first World War the desire for their own corps house arose. For this purpose, the club Verein Alter Darmstädter Franken (VADaF) was founded on July 15, 1919. Wilhelm von Opel led the club as chairman and 1920, he was elected as the first Ehrenbursch of the corps, a very honorary member. Together with his nephew Hans von Opel, Wilhelm donated 60.000 Reichsmark and provided a loan for further 50.000 RM to make the house project possible. The Opel family (and later Klaus Mahn as well) raised further voluntary donations, whose amounts exceeded the average payments many times, which is apparent from the cash reports and bank statements. Wilhelm von Opel signed a duty to assure lifelong financial support to the corps, which even moved on to his children.

=== From National Socialism to today ===
In 1933, members of fencing fraternities were requested to join the SA and the SS. Like all other corps, Franconia was forced to dismiss their not-aryan corps brothers, when the WSC joined the Allgemeinen Deutschen Waffenring. Although the affected members wanted to leave the corps voluntarily, their corps brothers did not accept this and tried to get special regulation for them - without success.

The democratic principle of the corps was inconsistent with the Führerprinzip, which endangered the existence of the fraternities and the corps. Franconia was lively keen for a working relationship between the fraternities and their political environment. The NSDStB drew on more and more fraternity traditions. A lot of resistance was raised against this adsorption: For example, in May 1930 the German corps magazine printed an explicit warning about political engagement in general and within the NSDAP especially.

In a meeting the corps unanimously denied to provide themselves as a Kameradschaft. Under pressure of the national socialist student leadership, the corps suspended on October 19, 1935, and the WSC ended with its voluntary disbanding, the only alternative to escape the NSDStB. Despite the disbanding of the corps, the participating VADaF club kept up under provisional leadership through Arthur Tix, as it did not stand in contrast to any party authorities".

With the exception of the Corps Franconia, all other Corps in Darmstadt sold their houses. This way, Franconia could continue its activities in the rented house, but under much harder conditions. From 1939, a few rooms of the corps house were provided for the Kameradschaft Kaspar (named after its leader), to which the corps members stand in contact. In 1941, the Kameradschaft was renamed in Kameradschaft Litzmann. The corps member Dr. Georg Wilhelm Lotterhos was able to prevent the full integration of the VADaF's members and property into the NSDAP, which is apparent from the correspondence between him and the Nazi student leadership in 1943/1944. In chronist Dr. Peter Heß opinion, the Corps would not exist anymore without the leaders of the VADaF.

In the end of the Third Reich the Kameradschaft dissolved and the Corps was reconstituted on September 18, 1948. After receiving the approval of the Technical University the fraternity fully started its first semester program in the winter semester of 1949/1950. After the second World War, the corps consisted of 10-15 members.

Since 1949 the corps continued its activities continuously. The press and agents from politics and university regularly visit the Corps to tell their congratulations.

Both in 1970/71 and in 2016/17 the Corps Franconia led the Weinheimer Senioren-Convent for each one year. Through the Corps' endeavours, the WSC was opened first for Corps in non-German speaking countries. The opening of the WSC was recorded as decision of fundamental importance. The newspapers quoted chairman Jonathan Hildebrand, saying "The opening for other associations and for the public is one of the most important topic at the conference. (transl.)"

On the basis of historically grown relations, there is an exchange program with the American fraternity Tau Kappa Epsilon. Timothy J. Murphy, executive vice president of TKE 1996–2000 is a member of the Corps. Since 1972 there is also a friendship relation to the Corps Normannia Vandalia Munich.

== Symbols ==
The Corps' colors black/ white/ lime-green with silvered edge, are worn as traditional Couleur. A Fuchs typically wears a two-colored ribbon in black and white. Headgear and the traditional suit Pekesche is made from black cloth.

Its motto is Nec temere - nec timide or "Neither act thoughtless - nor timidly or Handle besonnen - bleibe frei von Furcht.

Its coat of arms shows the colors and the Zirkel at the top of the left, the Lion of Hesse at the top of the right, the crossed swords with oak leaves and laurel wreath and weapon slogan G.U.N. (lat. Gladius Ultor Noster) and the foundation date (November 16, 1889). In the last field there is the Burg Frankenstein in the near of Darmstadt. In the middle there are the old colors of the Academic Cycling Club (white and green with golden edge).

The coat of arms in the colors black/ white/ lime-green is still on the historic Wappentor of the Wachenburg.

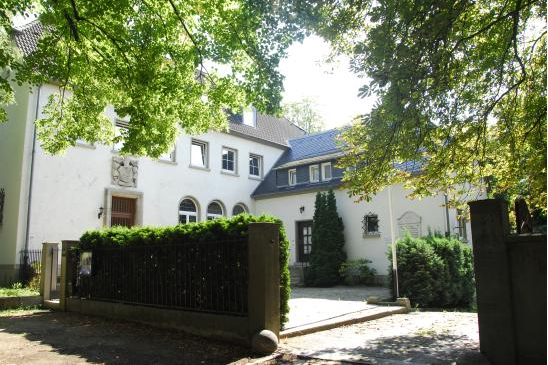
Current house of the Corps

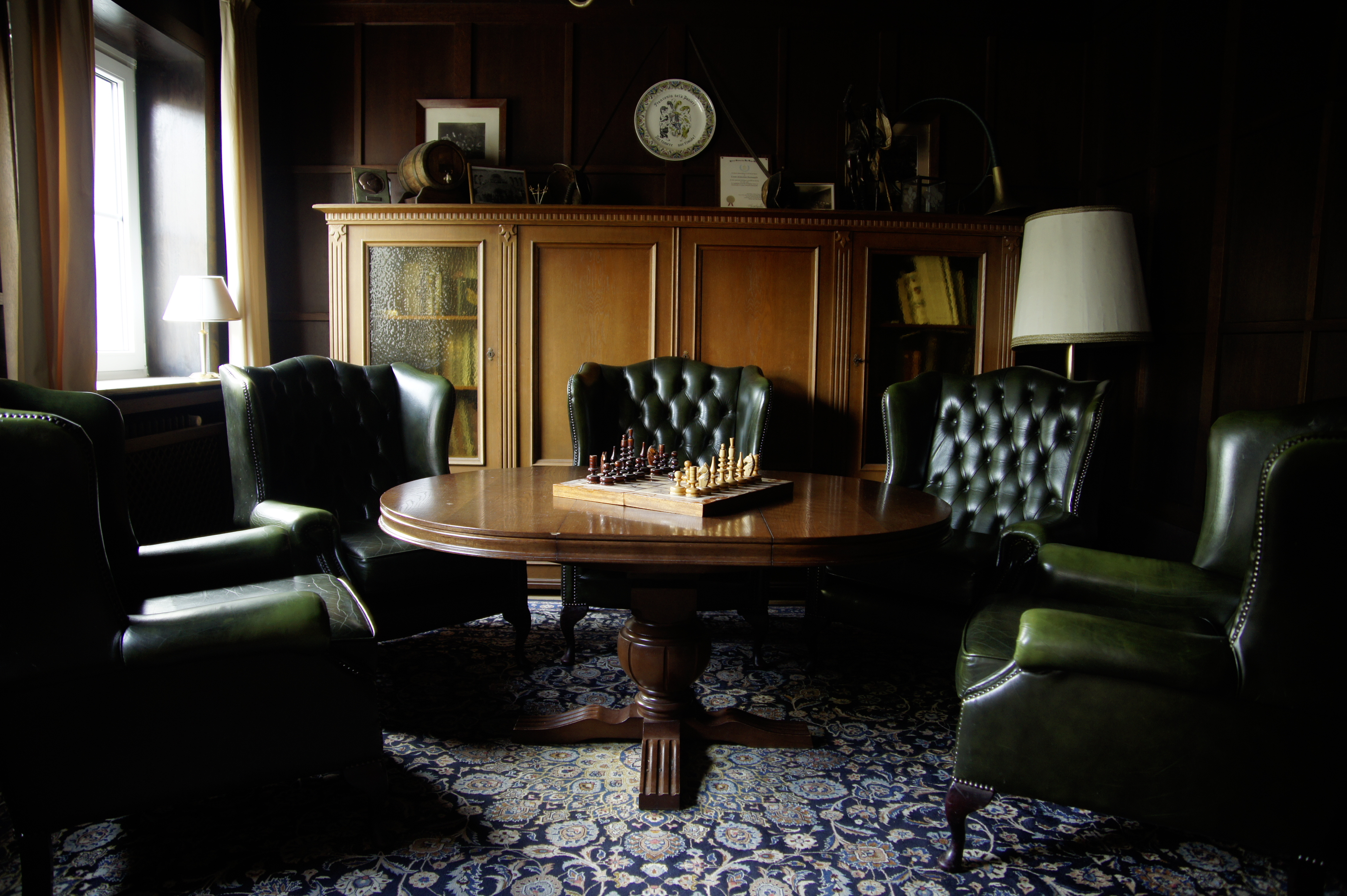
Opel room

== Fraternity house ==
On September 26, 1919, the Corps bought a house in the Frankfurt Strasse 15, Darmstadt. This was sold in 1930 to a Cartellverband fraternity. A committee, which also joined Wilhelm von Opel and Hans von Opel, decided together with the tenured professor of architecture, Paul Meissner, about the drafts for the new house. On July 7, 1928, the foundation stone was laid down ceremonially. A report in the Darmstädter Tagblatt from March 23, 1928, attested the public interest of the event. With Friedrich Dingeldey, Otto Berndt and mayor August Buxbaum agents from both university and city visited the ceremony. The official opening was celebrated on July 7, 1929. Next to a lot of other speakers, mayor Rudolf Mueller and his Magnificence Haus Rau delivered their congratulations, as the newspaper reported on its front page.

As the only Corps in Darmstadt, Franconia did not sold the new house in the national socialism, but partially provided it to a Kameradschaft. On September 14, 1944, it was heavily damaged in an air raid. Until 1953 the reconstruction was compleded most extensive. Also a memorial for the fallen Corps members was moved to the corps house and expanded for the fallen Corps brothers in World War II.

== Social commitment ==
=== The Circle ===
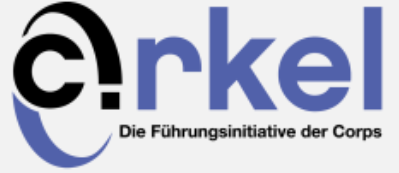
C!rkel e.V.

In 2012, the corps member Oliver Zimmermann founded the C!rkel e.V. (registered club). This club made the support of young professionals to its business. It offers general and student-orientated further education to give better job perspectives for as many Corps students as possible. Among the coaches are professors, executive employees and chief executive officers, exclusive from the corps student ranks. Also the executive committee is composed of members of the corps.

=== Weinheim Seminars ===
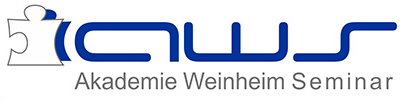
AWS e.V.

The seminars of the AWS e.V. (Academy Weinheim Seminars) is an essential element of the agenda of the Weinheimer Senioren Convent. The Academy Weinheim Seminars e.V. is a registered club. It offers seminars in the topics Assessment centre, management, rhetoric, Neuro-linguistic programming, negotiation, etiquette, organization and group theory.

In 1970/71 when the Corps Franconia was the executive Corps ("Vorort") within the Weinheimer Senioren Convent, it founded the "Kuratorium Weinheim Seminar", the predecessor of today's AWS e.V.

=== Jugend Aktiv ===
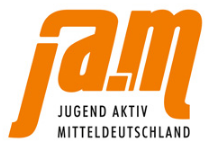
Jugend Aktiv central Germany

In 2000, the corps member Götz Junkers-Lommatzsch founded the club "Jugend Aktiv e.V." in Hamburg. With its coaching and training program, especially very talented young professionals get supported. Throughout Germany, more than 2000 pupils got sponsored until 2011. The coaching program comprises seminars in the topics personal development, networking, logistics and individual mentorship by personnel consultants.

Important partners of Jugend Aktiv are the Handelshochschule Leipzig, the Technische Universität Braunschweig as well as the Konrad-Adenauer-Stiftung. The program stands in coordination with the Federal Ministry for Economic Affairs and the ministries of education from several federal states. Today, the founder is honorary member both of the corps and the club. When he received for the Wachenburg-Medaille (the highest award from the WVAC) the magazine "Corps" reported:

Götz Junkers-Lommatzsch made an outstanding contribution about the WSC. On his initiative and with his decisive support the Jugend Aktiv e.V. was founded. The "club for the support of initiative and responsibility" appeals pupils from higher grades. This opens new ways to high schools and ministries of education (transl.).

— magazine "Corps" 3/2004

=== Friends for peace ===
In 2012 the Corps Franconia officially supported the club Freunde für Frieden - friends for peace. In addition to financial assistance, the corps supported the club also by providing premises and the active support from several corps members. Beyond that and with other partners, the corps participated in the 6th Darmstädter Lichterzug, a symbol against racism and hostility to strangers.

== Notable members ==
- Hatto Brenner (* 1940), President of European Union of Medium-sized Business (short: EUMU)
- Wilhelm Cornelius (1915-1996), Inventor of the Orthotropic deck
- Peter Jühling (1925–2011), Honorary president of IHK
- Hans Walter Lotterhos (1914-1989), President of Alumni organization Weinheimer Verband Alter Corpsstudenten (WVAC)
- Klaus Mahn (1934–1993), Writer, Author of Perry Rhodan
- Fritz Mouson (1884–1926), Industrialist, creator of the Mouson Tower in Frankfurt am Main
- Carl von Opel (1869–1927), Industrialist of the German automobile manufacture
- Hans von Opel (1899–1948), Industrialist
- Wilhelm von Opel (1871–1948), Industrialist of the German automobile manufacture
- Hanns Pellar (1886–1971), Professor, Austrian painter, illustrator
- Willy Sachs (1896–1958), Industrialist
- Hermann Schwind (1923–2009), Professor at TU Dortmund
- Karl Hans Simmrock (1930–2017), Tenured professor at TU Dortmund
- Arthur Tix (1897-1971), Honorary doctor of Technische University of Clausthal

== Recipients of the Klinggraeff-Medal (Klinggräff-Medaille) ==
The Klinggraeff-Medal is awarded for the combination of extraordinary accomplishments in academia, involvement for the fraternity and proven leadership on local and, preferentially, national level. The award indirectly reflects back at the fraternity, showing leaders in their field among the fraternity's brothers. The medal is rewarded with EUR 4.000. For more information see Klinggräff-Medaille at the Association of German Student Corps Alumni.

Recipients of the Klinggraeff-Medal for the Corps Franconia are:

- Harald Frank (1994)
- Christian Eickhorn (1998)
- Alexander Megej (2002)
- Nicolas Gatzke (2010)
- Fabian von Blücher (2019)

== See also ==
- German Student Corps
- List of members of German student corps
- List of Corps of WSC

== Literature ==
- Technische Hochschule Darmstadt (Hrsg.): Hochschulführer Darmstadt, Darmstadt 1922, S. 92
- E. H. Eberhard: Handbuch des studentischen Verbindungswesens. Leipzig, 1924/25, S. 131.
- Hans Schüler: Weinheimer S.C.-Chronik, Darmstadt 1927, S. 401–432.
- Michael Doeberl u. a. (Hrsg.): Das akademische Deutschland, Band 2: Die deutschen Hochschulen und ihre akademischen Bürger, Berlin 1931, S. 724.
- Dr. Peter Heß: Geschichte des Corps Franconia zu Darmstadt. Mainz 1998. http://d-nb.info/997404396
- Manfred Studier: Der Corpsstudent als Idealbild der Wilhelminischen Ära - Untersuchungen zum Zeitgeist 1888 bis 1914, Abhandlungen zum Studenten- und Hochschulwesen, Band 3, Schernfeld 1990, ISBN 3-923621-68-X
- Paulgerhard Gladen (2007), Die Kösener und Weinheimer Corps: Ihre Darstellung in Einzelchroniken (in German) (1st ed.), Hilden: WJK-Verlag, pp. 219–220, ISBN 978-3-933892-24-9
- Paulgerhard Gladen (2007), Geschichte der studentischen Korporationsverbände (in German), vol. 1 (2nd, überarbeitete und erweiterte ed.), Hilden: WJK-Verlag, p. 49, ISBN 978-3-933892-28-7
- Frederic Beier: Korporiert!, Entstanden im Sommersemester 2005 an der Fachhochschule Darmstadt im Entwurfskurs unter der Betreuung von Herrn Prof. Christian K. Pfestorf und Frau Wiebke Schwarzpaul. S. 16f.
- Stephan Peters (Hrsg.): Intellektuelle Tiefgarage. Auf den Spuren studentischer Korporationen in der Wissenschaftsstadt Darmstadt, Darmstadt, June 2005, S. 84f., ISBN 3-9807550-1-0
- Becker, G. et al. (zsgest. & hrsg. von Vorstand des Weinheimer Verbandes Alter Corpsstudenten in Zsarb. mit der Historischen Kommission des WVAC): 100 Jahre Weinheimer Senioren-Convent. Festschrift zum 100jährigen Bestehen des Weinheimer Senioren-Convents. Laupenmüller & Dierichs, Bochum 1963.
