= Schau- und Sichtungsgarten Hermannshof =

Privately owned show and trial garden in Germany

Coordinates: 49.5477°N 8.6697°E

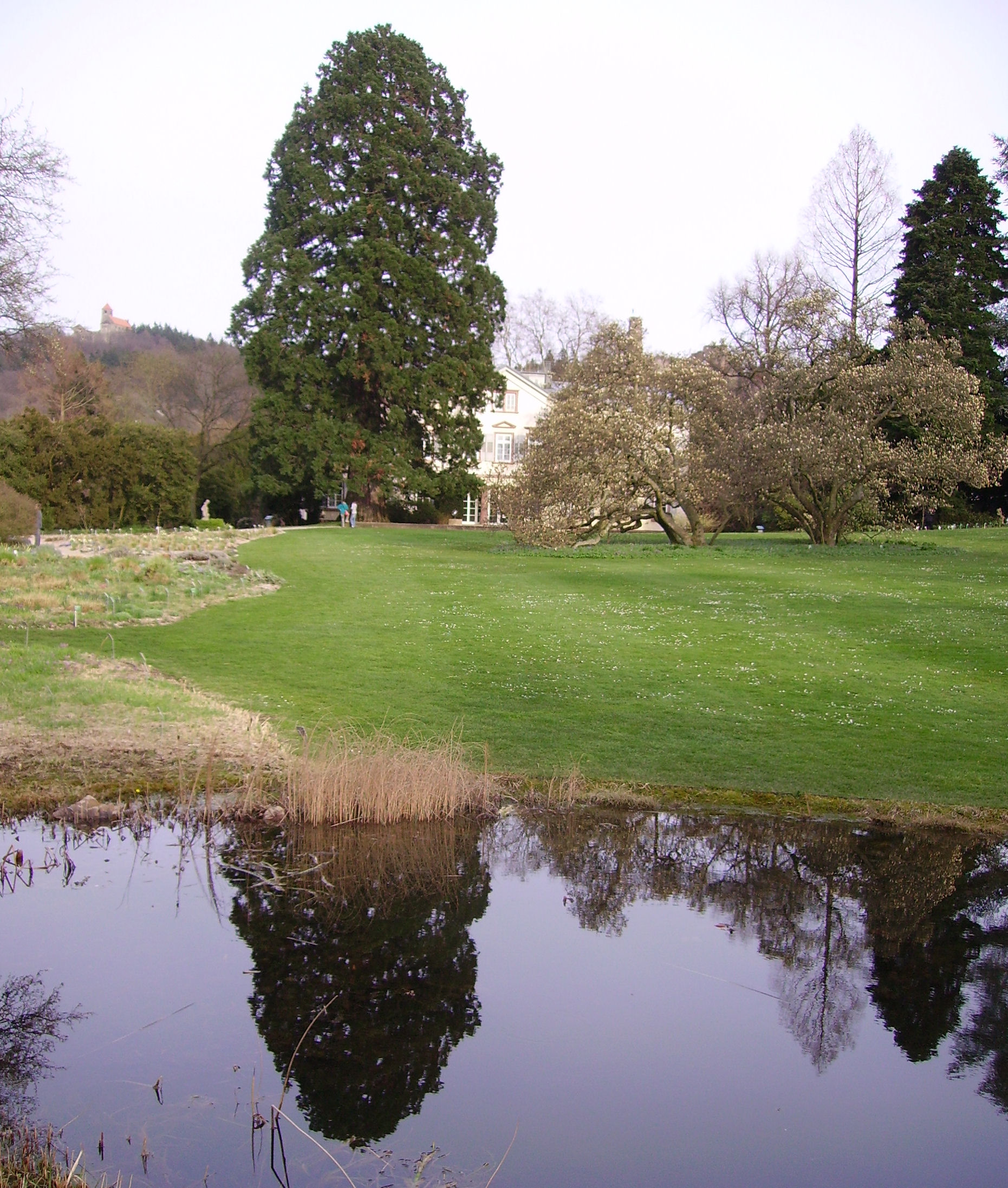
Schau- und Sichtungsgarten Hermannshof

The Schau- und Sichtungsgarten Hermannshof (2.2 hectares), also known as the Hermannshof Weinheim, is a privately owned show and trial garden at Babostraße 5, Weinheim, Baden-Württemberg, Germany. It is open to the public daily, admission is free.

Today's garden was first established over 200 years ago. It was acquired by the Freudenberg industrialist family in 1888, and in the 1920s, it was redesigned by landscape architect Heinrich Friedrich Wiepking-Jürgenmann. In 1981 to 1983, it was redesigned as a public garden by landscape architect Hans Luz of Stuttgart and developed as a scientific institution jointly owned by the Freudenberg Company and the town of Weinheim. In 2023 the scientific research at the Hermannshof was discontinued due to reduced funding.

The garden still cultivates about 2500 taxa arranged in naturalistic plantings, including theme gardens like a peony collection (created 1998) and North American prairie garden (2001, 1500 m^{2}) containing over 350 plants. It also contains a number of notable trees, including specimens of Platanus orientalis and Platanus × hispanica that are over 230 years old, as well as Cedrus atlantica, Ginkgo biloba, Magnolia denudata, Magnolia × soulangeana, Myrtus communis, and Sequoia dating from the late 19th century.

== See also ==
- Exotenwald Weinheim
- List of botanical gardens in Germany
