= Miramar (Weinheim) =

Tourist attraction in Weinheim, Germany

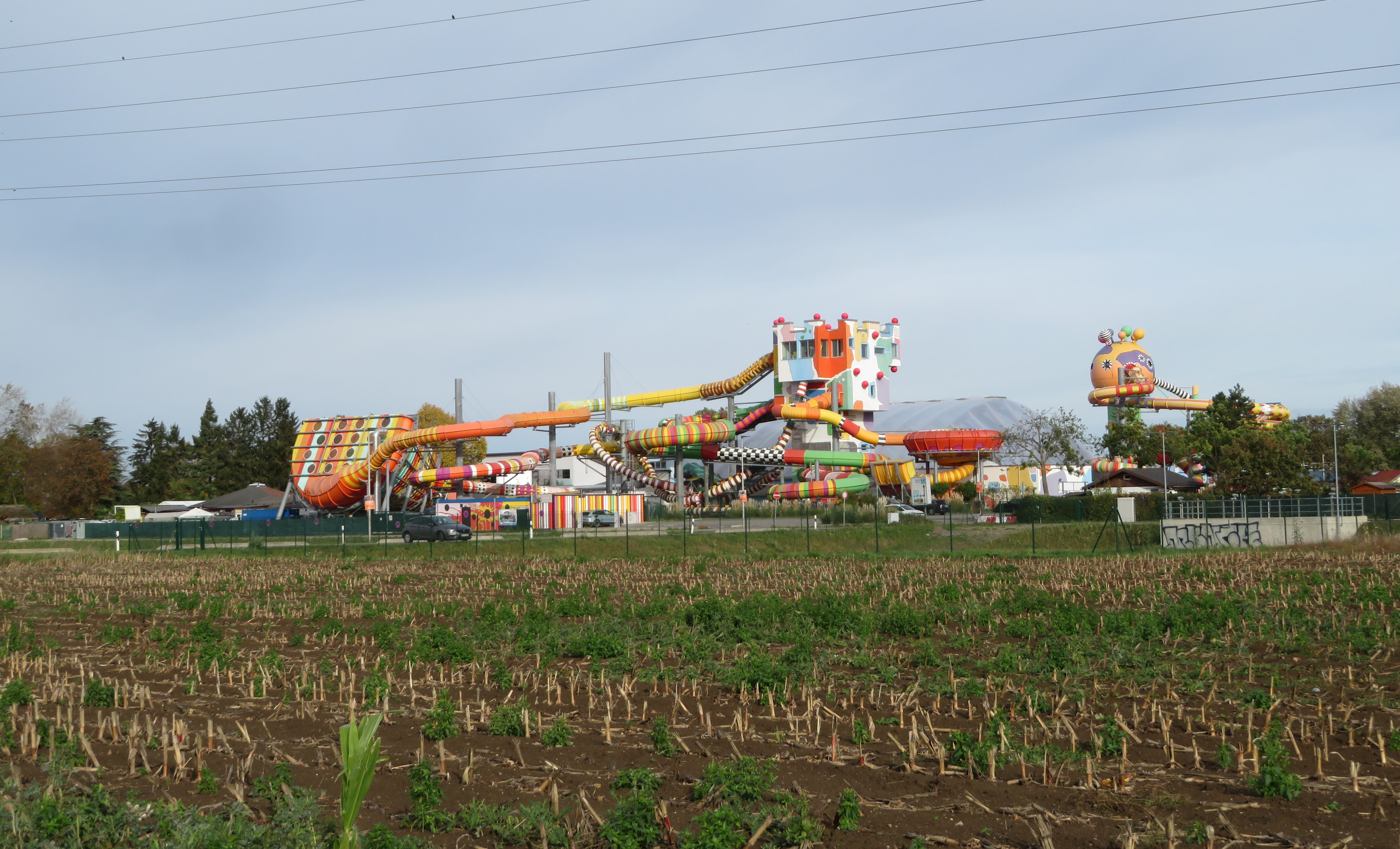
- Interactive map of Miramar
- Slogan: More than a day's holiday!; Mehr als ein Tag Urlaub!
- Location: Waidsee, Waid, Weinheim, Germany
- Coordinates: 49.533°N 8.643°E
- General manager: Marcus Steinhart
- Opened: 26 October 1973
- Visitors per annum: 600,000
- Area: 50,000 square metres (12 acres)
- Pools: 11 pools
- Water slides: 9 water slides
- Children's areas: 2 children's areas
- Saunas: 12 saunas
- Website: www.miramar-bad.de

Miramar is a water park, salt-water spa and sauna complex opened in 1973 at the Waidsee Lake, Weinheim, Germany. As of 2014, approximately 50% of the 650,000 annual visitors pay extra for the Sauna area. The catchment area for visitors covers a 100 kilometres (60 mi) radius, including Frankfurt am Main to the north, and Pforzheim to the south.

The main bathing area contains a wave pool and several slides. As of 2018 there were nine water slides in the main indoor pool area with various levels of difficulty and speed, plus jacuzzis and outside areas. The thermal spa area has saltwater pools, and these pools are also used to offer physiotherapy.

The sauna area is designated as a nudist (FKK, Freikörperkultur) area, which is extended to the swimming and thermal spa areas on Tuesday evenings.

== History ==
The original swimming bath complex owned by the Town of Weinheim was offered for sale. In late-1987 Miramar was purchased by the Steinhart family for the symbolic price of one Deutsche Mark, after which significant expansion and development followed.

Each year 20.34 terajoules (5.65 GWh) of geothermal heating is used, with hot water at 63.5 °C (146 °F) extracted from a borehole with a flowrate of 9–10 litres per second (0.32–0.35 cu ft/s).

The water park had its fortieth birthday in 2013, by which time 17.5 million people had visited.

Works of art are present through the whole premises.

The operation of the on-site shop and massage services are leased out, but the catering in the restaurants is kept in-house by Miramar. Of the 150 employees Miramar had in 2014, approximately fifty were working in the catering division, and twenty in cleaning.

During the COVID-19 pandemic in Germany Miramar was closed for seven months. During closure the changing areas were renovated and additional electronic payment facilities introduced.

In December 2024 a fire occurred in the Kristall Therma spa area causing €20 million of damage. Between December 2024 and summer 2025 Miramar remained closed for repair works and additional renovation worth €1.8 million. As of May 2025 reopening of the Sauna and pool areas were planned for 16 June 2025, followed later by the Therma area in December 2025.

== Water slides ==
The indoor complex at Miramar has a number of slides, including an AquaBowl, a TurboSlide and an AquaRacer water slide installed by Aquarena. In summer 2012 a vertical drop AquaLoop water slide called "Hurricane Loop" was opened. In April 2017, a 125-metre-long (410 ft) slide called "Twister" was scheduled to be opened by the Lord Mayor of Weinheim, Heiner Bernhard (de).

Slides are inspected and certified by the Technical Inspection Associations (TÜV, Technischer Überwachungsverein).

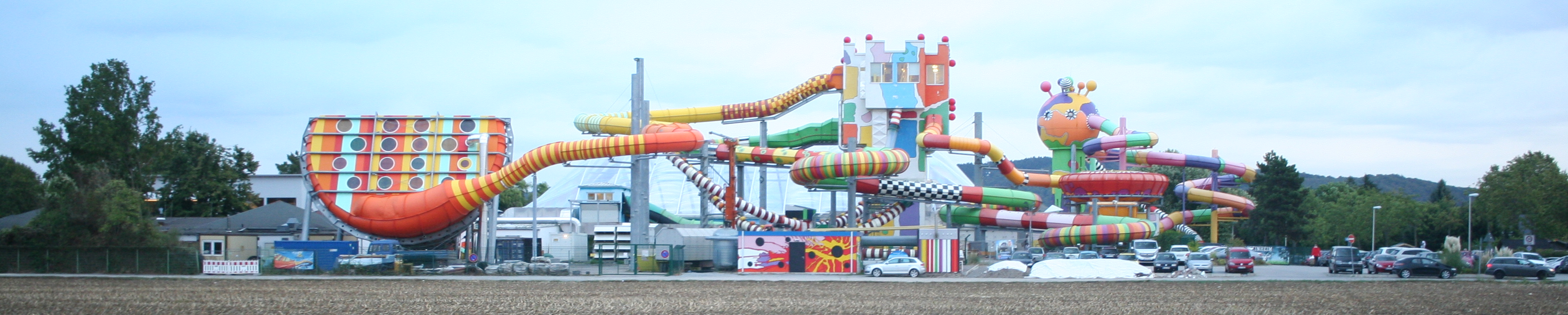
Miramir water slides and logistics area.

Miramar has slides called "Blizzard" (previously Grüner Hai, "Green Shark") and "Typhoon" (previously Blauer Wal, "Blue Whale"). Those slides were the first slides and the oldest, constructed in the 1990s by Dutch manufacturer PPK Promoplast. They got replaced in 2018 and 2019 with new slide tubes build by Austrian manufacturer Aquarena, on a slightly altered alignment.

== Sauna complex ==
The sauna and relaxation area is a nudist/FKK area at all times. In 1998 the Sauna and relaxation areas were rebuilt.

Prior to April 2001, there had also been nudism/FKK in the other areas on Sunday evenings. Prior to May 2013, there had also been nudism/FKK in the other areas on Saturday evenings.

In April 2018, a tree house sauna ("Baumsauna") looking out over the Waidsee Lake was opened, which had cost €800,000 and took six months to build. The outside parts of sauna are built from special kelo wood imported from Finland. The internal support structure modelled as tree trunk is constructed from reinforced concrete covered with Fiberglass and artificial tree bark. The structure is 8.5 metres (28 ft) high, with the access walkways fitted around the existing surrounding mature trees.

== Safety ==
As of summer 2018 Miramar employed a former police officer to oversee visitor safety, with dedicated safety teams patrolling at busy times. In cooperation with the police force, staff and lifeguards at the Miramar pool are trained in safeguarding techniques. All incidents and reports are recorded to identify patterns. A €250 fine, followed by Miramar site ban, is applied for breaches of the pool or sauna etiquette rules. As of mid 2018 twenty-nine bans were in place, including four for private masturbation on the premises.

=== Incidents ===
In August 2018 four teenagers were found guilty of sexually harassing a group other teenagers at Miramar and sentenced to community service.
