= Hans von Opel =

Johann Jakob "Hans" Opel (from 1918 von Opel; 27 Jule 1889 – 25 June 1948) was a German industrialist from the Opel family.

Johann Jakob von Opel was the nephew of the car fabricant Adam Opel and son of Carl von Opel and Helene Wilhelmine Mouson. When his father Carl was raised upon the nobility, this also applied to his descendants and he was allowed, to go by the name von Opel.

Hans von Opel and Salomon Meyer were the founders of the Hansa finance corporation for car trading companies, which developed to a leading German holding and finance company. His wife was Sophie von Opel-Hübscher (1902–1989). After the early death of her husband, she married Karl Binding of the same name of the traditional brewery family. Hans von Opel left her wife a considerable capital, which later formed the basis for the Sophie and Karl Binding foundation.

Hans von Opel was an honorary member and part of the Corps Franconia Darmstadt.

== See also ==
- Sophie and Karl Binding foundation.
