= Valentino Bellucci =

Italian philosopher, poet, and painter (1975–2021)

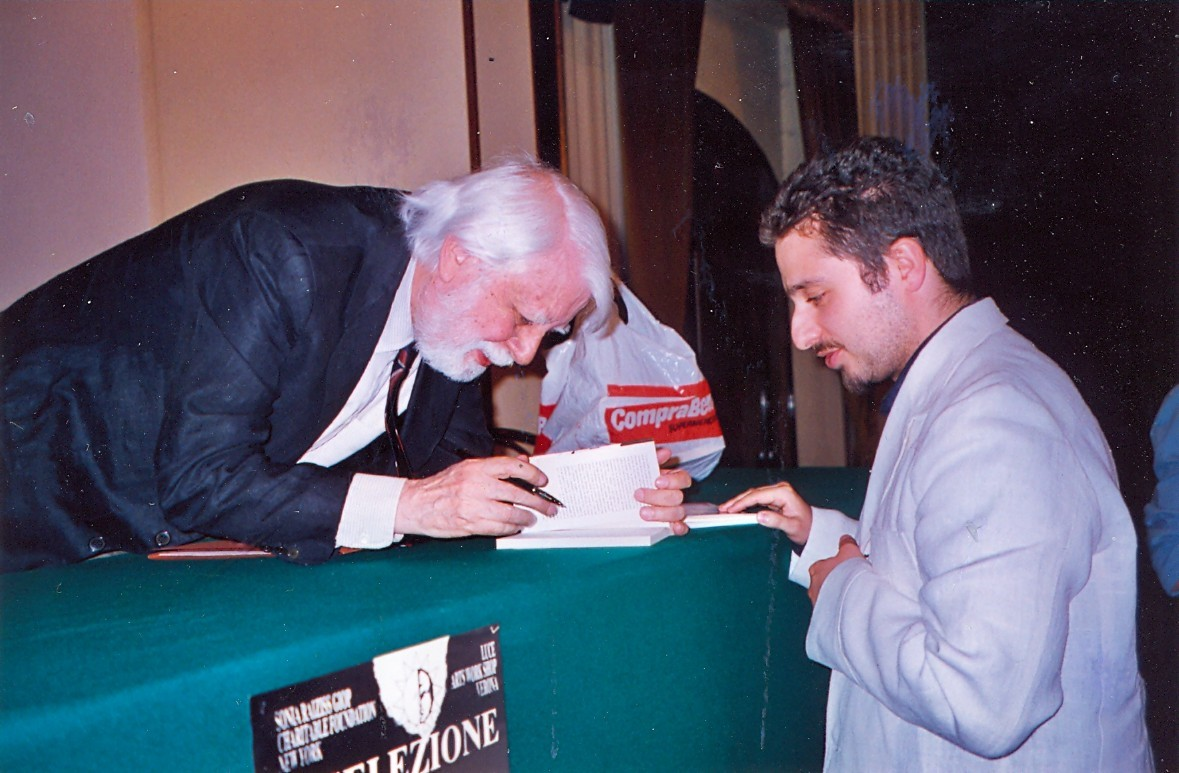
Valentino Bellucci (right) with Giovanni Raboni

Valentino Bellucci (1975 – 16 December 2021) was an Italian sociologist, poet, painter, and essayist.

== Life and career ==
Bellucci was born in Weinheim, Baden-Württemberg, West Germany. He taught "History and critical analysis of the video-theater" at the Academy of Fine Arts in Macerata. He was a teacher of history and philosophy at the Italian high schools and cooperated with seminars at the University of Urbino. After studying with the Orientalist Icilio Vecchiotti, he dedicated himself to the oriental culture, especially to the Vaishnava Bhakti tradition, exploring the epistemological, historical and psychological aspects. He devoted himself to an intensive information activity, concerning the philosophy and sociology, with his publications and conferences. As a painter, he followed in particular the figurative school of Pietro Annigoni. Some of his works are displayed in some churches in the Marche region. In 2003 Giovanni Raboni rewarded him for a poetic composition, he has participated (and directed) at several films and his poems were recited by the actor Walter Maestosi. He died from a heart attack on 16 December 2021, at the age of 46 at the Torrette regional hospital in Ancona.

== Thought ==
Bellucci developed the existential themes of mysticism, both in the Western philosophical and religious tradition and in the Vaishnava Bhakti one; in the essay “Lo yoga devozionale indiano” (The Indian devotional yoga) he explains the social importance of the spirituality as existential journey rather than as institutionalized dogma. From a sociological point of view his analysis focused on the origins of the ancient Vedic culture; in his essay about Varna he shows how the ills of modern society derive from the break with the great traditional civilizations; therefore the historical and epistemological paradigms have to be rethought in the light of the ancient wisdom. Furthermore, he investigated the origins of Christianity, inspired by the work of Mario Canciani, identifying lost lifestyles and teachings. Bellucci proposed a critical recovery of ancient civilisations whose knowledges have a considerable social and individual value. His historical and sociological analyses led him to consider modernity as a mystification, a kind of collective self-deception that the society cultivates since the atheist and materialist Enlightenment; this mystification derives from an a priori rejection of the sacred, the divine, in order to follow the idols of technic and advanced capitalism. In this sense, his investigation continued following in the footsteps of scholars as Jean Servier and Marcel de Corte.

== Works ==
- Il pensiero estremo. Saggi sui filosofi contemporanei, Tabula Fati, 2004.
- Dialogo su George Bataille, Nuova Corrente, Tilgher, Genova 2004, n.133, pp. 55–65.
- Walter Benjamin. La duplice genealogia del simbolo e della verità, Ghibli, 2004.
- Tutt'altro che animale. Riflessioni da Merleau-Ponty a Derrida, sui rapporti tra umanità e animalità, Studi urbinati, Urbino 2006
- Lo yoga devozionale indiano. Il vaishnavismo, Xenia, 2011.
- Il benessere attraverso l'Ayurveda, Editoriale Programma, 2013.
- Cristo era vegetariano?, Editoriale Programma, 2013.
- Godot è arrivato. Conferenze, interventi e note critiche, Petite Plaisance, 2014.
- Il Sutra del naufrago. Aforismi e note di un osservatore di fronte al crollo del mondo moderno, Petite Plaisance, 2014.
- Le strutture sociali del Varnâshrama-Dharma, Solfanelli 2014.
- L'estasi e le pietre, Lepisma, 2015.
- L'invenzione dell'inferno, Harmakis, 2015.
- La Chiesa di Darwin, Harmakis, 2015.
- The Church of Darwin : Dogmas of evolution and scientists that criticize it, Harmakis, 2016
- Miti e misteri dell'Emilia Romagna, coautrice Gabriella Chmet, Editoriale Programma, 2016
- Che cos'è il Karma, Harmakis, 2016
- Da Pitagora a Guerre stellari. Il sapere esoterico dei veri illuminati, Petite Plaisance, 2016
- Hulk si innamora, Giovane Holden, 2019
- Krishna. La storia, la filosofia, la mistica, Xenia, 2019.
