= Fritz Mouson =

German industrialist

Friedrich Karl Mouson, named Fritz (10 June 1884 – 20 May 1926) was a German industrialist for soap and perfume and partner of the company J.G. Mouson & Cie. The high point of his entrepreneurial work was to build the ten-storey Mouson tower, the first high-rise building in Frankfurt.

== Life ==
Fritz Mouson was the son of the industrialist Jacques Mouson (1842–1915) and his wife Eleonore Dorothea, born Hock (1848–1911) and the great-grandchild of August Friedrich Mouson. He studied machine construction at the Technischen Hochschule Darmstadt. There he joined the Corps Franconia Darmstadt an. Afterwards he worked for the Opel company in Rüsselsheim am Main, inter alia as racing driver. Since 1912, he was partner of J.G. Mouson & Cie. In corporation with the architect Robert Wollmann and Josef Geittner, Mouson led the technical and structural reorganization of the factory site from 1921 to 1926 in Frankfurts Ostend. For information purposes, Mouson traveled a lot through Germany and the United States. With this knowledge, he was able to transform his company to a far-reaching automated and assembly-line-oriented industrial company.

Next to his activities in the family company, Mouson was member of the supervisory board of Frankfurts general insurance company (Frankfurter Allgemeinen Versicherungs-AG) and Frankfurt's life insurance company. He was a passionate hunter and supporter of painters and sculptors.

Mouson died unmarried and childless.

== Mouson tower ==
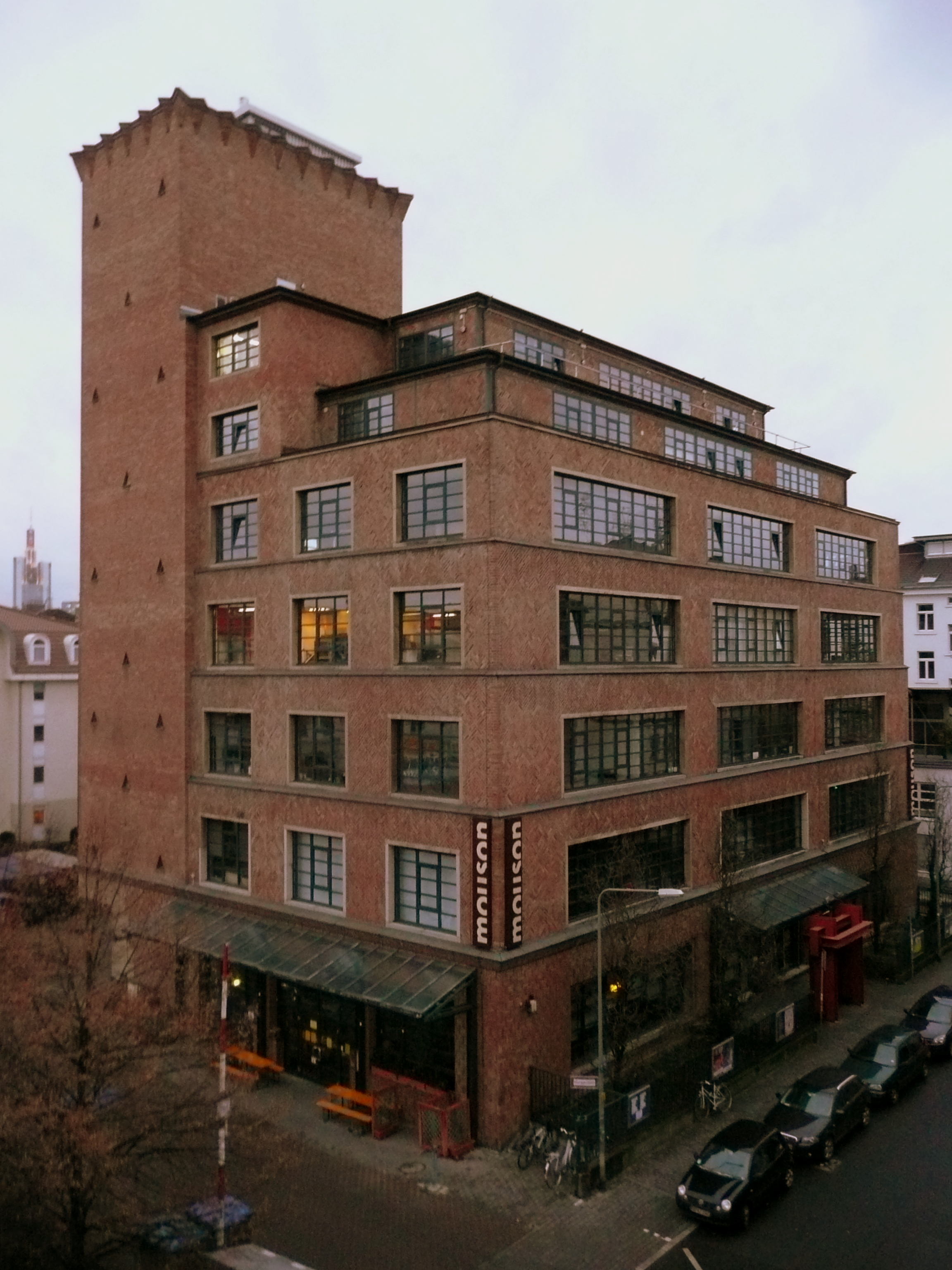
Mouson tower

The Mouson tower was the landmark of the new factory site. Fritz Mouson and Robert Wollmann drafted and built it from 1925–26. The expressionistic Mouson tower with its 34-meter and up to ten floors is regarded as the first High-rise building in Frankfurt.

The Mouson tower came through the second World War almost undamaged and has a preservation order on it since 1976. Since 1988, it is known as "art house Mousonturm" and is used as production and acting place for national and international artists from the field dancing, theater, performance, music, cabaret, literature and art.

== Literature (selection) ==
- Franz Lerner (1948), Diener der Schönheit. Gedenkblätter zum 150-jährigen Bestehen des Hauses J. G. Mouson & Co. (in German), Frankfurt am Main, pp. 24f, 27
- Thomas Zeller (2004), Die Architekten und ihre Bautätigkeit in Frankfurt am Main in der Zeit von 1870 bis 1950 (in German), Frankfurt am Main, p. 107
- Heike Risse (1984), Frühe Moderne in Frankfurt am Main von 1920-1933 (in German), Frankfurt am Main, pp. 154–158
- Volker Rödel (1986), Fabrikarchitektur in Frankfurt am Main 1774-1924 (in German), Frankfurt am Main, pp. 255, 630
