= Wachenburg =

Coordinates: 49°32′58″N 8°41′08″E

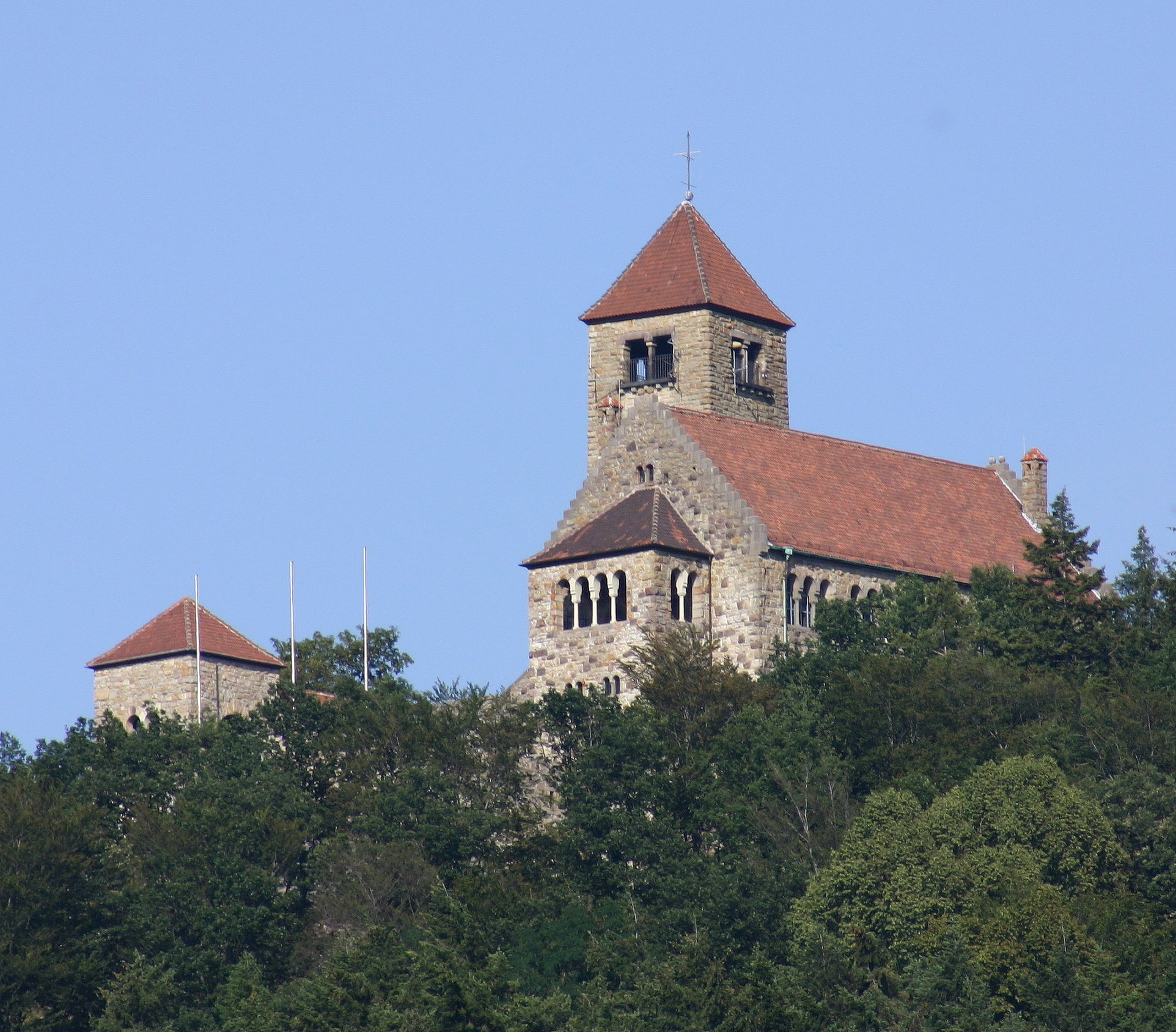
- Interactive map of the Wachenburg area

General information
- Location: Baden-Württemberg, Germany
- Construction started: 1907
- Construction stopped: 1928
- Client: Weinheimer Senioren-Convent

The Wachenburg (German: [ˈvaxn̩bʊʁk]) is a castle on a hill overlooking Weinheim an der Bergstrasse, in Baden-Württemberg, Germany. It was built between 1907 and 1928 by the Weinheimer Senioren-Convent, a Corps of former students. The castle contains a restaurant with a nice view of the country.

== See also ==
- Windeck Castle (Weinheim)
