= Windeck Castle (Weinheim) =

Historic monument in Germany

Coordinates: 49°32′46″N 8°40′38″E

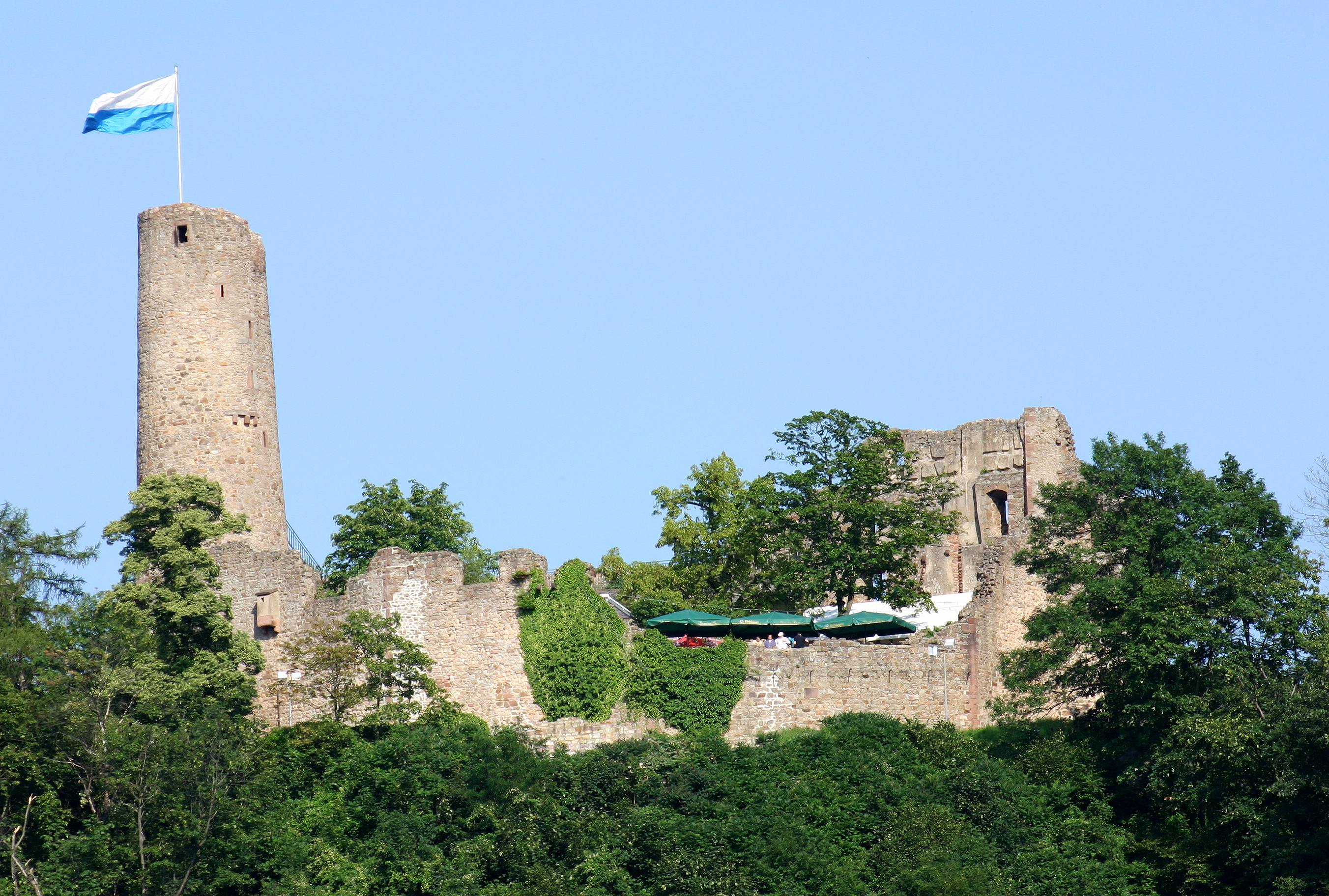
Windeck Castle (Weinheim).

Windeck Castle (German: Burg Windeck) stands on a small hill in Weinheim on the Bergstraße. It was built around 1100 to protect the inhabitants of the Lorsch monastery.

It was hugely damaged in 1674 by the troops of King Louis XIV of France. In 1960, the ruins were restored, the palace walls newly erected and the donjon safeguarded. It was acquired in 1978 by the city of Weinheim. In the 1980s, archaeological examinations and conservation works were carried out, and the ground plan was found, which gave an idea of the dimensions of the fortress. Today, the ruins of a fortress Windeck are classified as a historical monument.

A beer garden operates on its premises.

== See also ==
- Wachenburg
