= Hartmut K. Lichtenthaler =

German botanist

Hartmut K. Lichtenthaler (born 20 June 1934 in Weinheim, Germany) is a German botanist, plant physiologist and university professor.

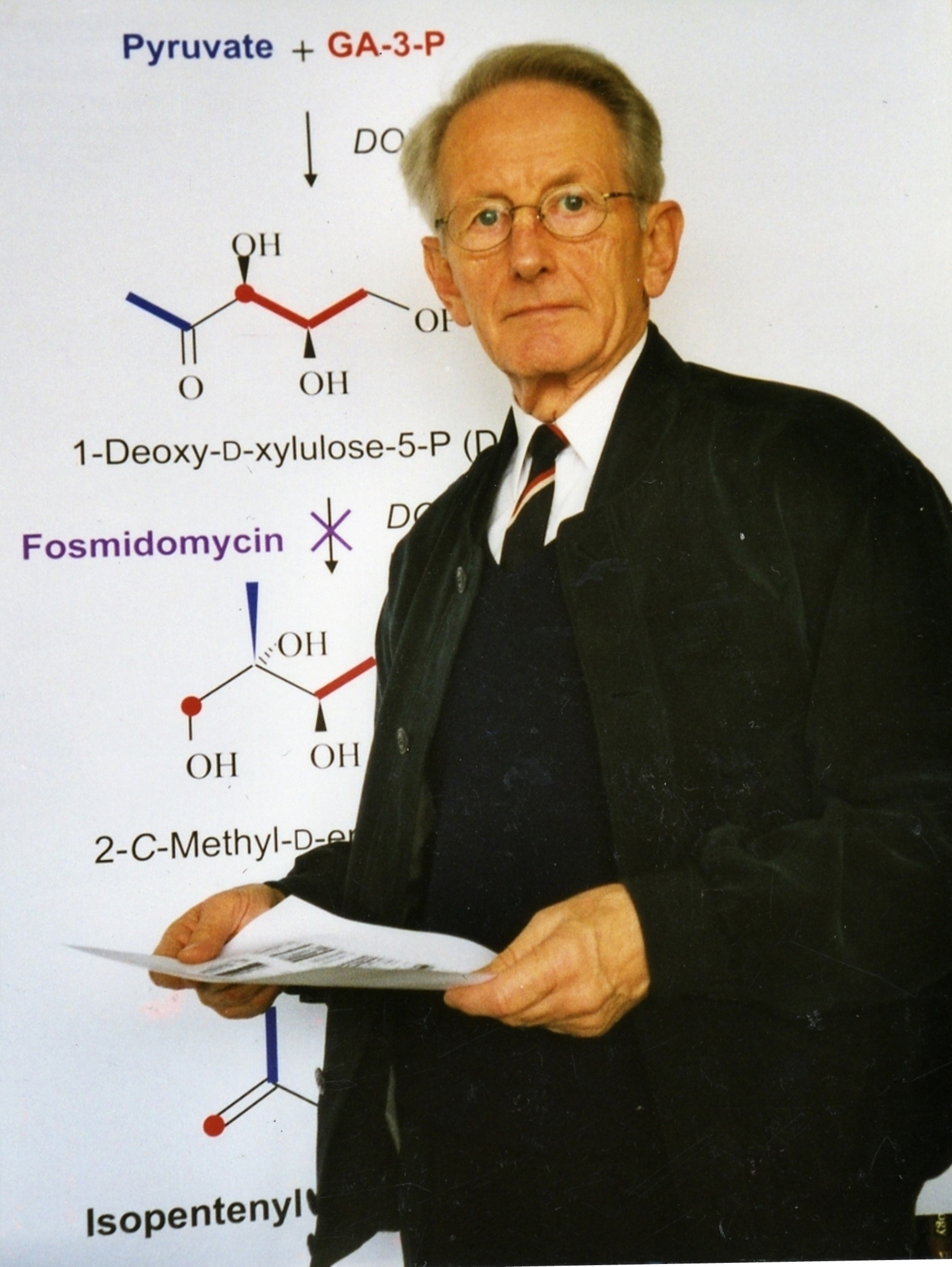
Hartmut K. Lichtenthaler in 1997

== Life ==
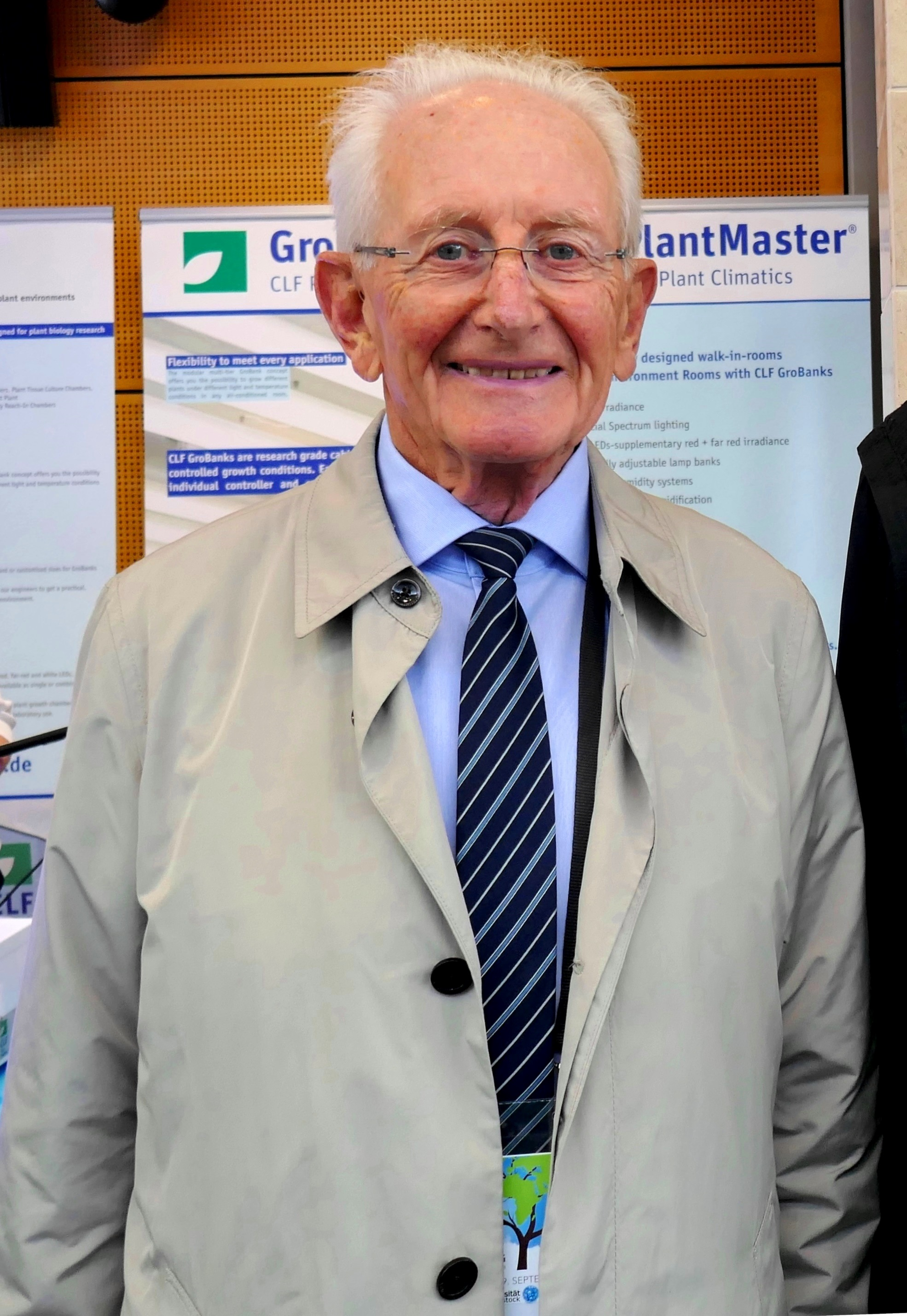
Hartmut K. Lichtenthaler at International Plant Science Conference in 2019

Hartmut Lichtenthaler studied pharmacy, biology and chemistry at the University of Karlsruhe (TH). In 1958, he completed his studies with the pharmaceutical state examination in Germany ('Staatsexamen'). In 1961, he earned his Ph.D. at the University of Heidelberg with a dissertation about vitamin K1 in plants at the institute of Professor August Seybold. In the period 1962–1964, he was a research fellow at the laboratory of Nobel laureate Melvin Calvin at the University of California, Berkeley. In 1964, he became an assistant professor at the University of Münster, where he completed his Habilitation in 1967 with a thesis about prenylquinones and osmiophilic plastoglobuli in chloroplasts. In 1970, he became a full professor for plant physiology, plant biochemistry and pharmaceutical biology at the University of Karlsruhe, Germany. Lichtenthaler developed his institute to a research center for photosynthesis, isoprenoid biochemistry and fluorescence imaging. In 2001, he became professor emeritus.

== Work ==
Lichtenthaler’s research fields are the photosynthesis of green plants, the light adaptation, pigment composition, photosynthetic function and ultrastructure of chloroplasts, the regulation of the plants’ isoprenoid biosynthesis, as well as the laser-induced fluorescence imaging of photosynthetic activity and of stress-detection in plants. He is known for establishing the non-mevalonate deoxyxylulose-phosphate / methylerythritol phosphate pathway (DOXP / MEP pathway) of isoprenoid biosynthesis in chloroplasts. The latter, which is responsible for the biosynthesis of carotenoids, prenyl-quinones, isoprene, mono- and diterpenes was detected in the 1990s (via ^{13}C-labelling + NMR-spectroscopy) in close cooperation with Michel Rohmer. Lichtenthaler also showed that the DOXP/MEP-pathway not only occurs in all photosynthetic organisms (plants, algae, photosynthetic bacteria), but also in pathogenic bacteria und the malaria parasite Plasmodium falciparum. He developed a plant-based test-system to find new drugs against malaria.

Lichtenthaler's scientific activities yielded 6 books and more than 410 publications in scientific journals. He was guest professor at the University of Gothenburg (1975) and University of Lancaster (1981). He promoted international scientific collaboration, organized many conferences and workshops and promoted young scientists. In 1978, Lichtenthaler was a co-founder of the Federation of European Societies of Plant Physiology (FESPP), and he acted from 1984 to 1986 as FESPP president. In 1988, he managed that – despite initial obstructions by the political authorities – the East European researchers from Russia, Hungary, the Czech Republic and East-Germany could become members of the European federation FESPP. Lichtenthaler also described the history and development of botanical co-operations, such as FESPP, and that of international symposia series and workshops in plant physiology and plant biochemistry.

== Honors and awards ==
Hartmut Lichtenthaler received multiple honors and awards, including among others

- 1992: Honorary member of the Hungarian Society of Plant Physiology
- 1996: Honorary doctorate (Dr. h.c.) Mendel University of Brno, Czech Republic
- 1997: Honorary doctorate (Dr. h.c.) and honorary professor (Prof. h.c.), Eötvös Loránd University, Budapest
- 2001: Honorary doctorate (Dr. h.c.) of Szent István University, Gödöllö, Hungary.
- 2001: Order of Merit of the Federal Republic of Germany (Bundesverdienstkreuz am Bande)
- 2003: Gregor J. Mendel Honorary Medal for Merits in Bio-Sciences (conferred by the Czech Academy of Sciences, Prague)
- 2004: Terry-Galliard-Medal for Merits in Plant Lipid Biochemistry
- 2010: Corresponding Membership Award of the American Society of Plant Biologists (ASPB)
- 2015: Lifetime Achievement Award (LTA-Award) for Photosynthesis of the Rebeiz Foundation, Champaign, USA
- 2017: Honorary membership of the German Society for Plant Sciences (DBG)

== Publications ==
Lichtenthaler has about 420 publications (original papers, reviews) in international scientific journals and books, including:

- Lichtenthaler H. K., and M. Calvin (1964) Quinone and pigment composition of chloroplasts and quantasome aggregates from Spinacia oleracea. Biochim. Biophys. Acta 79, 30-40.
- Tevini M., Lichtenthaler H.K. (eds.) Lipids and Lipid Polymers in Higher Plants, Springer Verlag, Berlin 1977.
- Lichtenthaler H.K. (ed.) Applications of Chlorophyll Fluorescence (in photosynthesis research, stress physiology, hydrobiology and remote sensing), Kluwer Academic Publishers, Dordrecht 1988.
- Lichtenthaler H.K. (ed.) Vegetation Stress, G. Fischer Verlag, Stuttgart 1996.
- Lichtenthaler H.K., J. Schwender, A. Disch, and M. Rohmer (1997) Biosynthesis of isoprenoids in higher plant chloroplasts proceeds via a mevalonate independent pathway. FEBS Letters 400, 271-274.
- Lichtenthaler, H.K. (1999) The 1-deoxy-d-xylulose-5-phosphate pathway of isoprenoid biosynthesis in plants. Annu. Rev. Plant Physiol. Plant Mol. Biol. 50, 47-65.
- Lichtenthaler H.K., J. Zeidler, J. Schwender and C. Müller (2000) The non-mevalonate isoprenoid biosynthesis of plants as a test-system for new herbicides and drugs against pathogenic bacteria and the malaria parasite. Z. Naturforsch. 55c, 305-313.
- Lichtenthaler H.K. (2000) The non-mevalonate isoprenoid biosynthesis: enzymes, genes and inhibitors. Biochem. Soc. Transactions 28,787-792.
- Lichtenthaler H.K. (2004) A history of the Federation of European Societies of Plant Physiology FESPP since its formation in 1978 – including notes on events preceding the foundation and following re-naming as the Federation of European Societies of Plant Biology (FESPB) in 2002. J. Plant Physiol. 161, 635-639.
- Lichtenthaler H.K., Babani F., Langsdorf G. (2007) Chlorophyll fluorescence imaging of photosynthetic activity in sun and shade leaves of trees. Photosynth. Research 93: 235-241.
- Lichtenthaler H.K. (2007) Biosynthesis, accumulation and emission of carotenoids, α-tocopherol, plastoquinone and isoprene in leaves under high photosynthetic irradiance. Photosynth. Research 92: 163-179.
- Rebeiz C, Bohnert H, Benning C, Daniell H, Hoober K, Lichtenthaler HK, Portis AR and Tripathy BC (eds.) (2010) The Chloroplast: Basics and Applications, Chapter 7, pp. 95–118. Springer, Dordrecht, The Netherlands.
- Lichtenthaler H.K. (2013) Plastoglobuli, thylakoids, chloroplast structure and development of plastids. In: “Plastid Development during Leaf growth and senescence”, B. Biswal, K. Krupinska, U. Biswal (eds), Chapter 15, pp. 416–444. Springer Science+Business Media B.V., Dordrecht, The Netherlands.
- Lichtenthaler H.K. (2015) Fifty five years of research on photosynthesis, chloroplasts and stress physiology of plants 1958–2013. Progress in Botany 76:3-42 (U. Lüttge, W. Beyschlag, eds.), Springer International Publishing, Switzerland.
